= List of films set in Puerto Rico =

This is a partial List of films set in Puerto Rico; either the movie's plot includes that island, the movie has been filmed there, or both. Certain movies that are supposed to be set in Cuba are filmed in Puerto Rico because of the U.S. embargo and similarities between both islands. To learn more about the films of Puerto Rico, see Cinema of Puerto Rico.

== # ==
- "4 Estrella" (filmed in Guaynabo)
- 12 Horas
- 22 Jump Street (filmed in San Juan)

== A ==
- Act of Valor
- The Adventurers
- After Twenty Years: Puerto Rico (1918)
- Aloma of the South Seas
- Un Amante Anda Suelto (1969)
- Amistad (filmed in San Juan)
- Amnesia (2006)
- Ángel (a Jacobo Morales film, not related to the U.S. television series)
- Angelito Mio
- El Anillo
- Assassins (filmed in San Juan)
- Au Pair 3
- Una Aventura Llamada Menudo

== B ==
- Back in the Day
- Bad Boys II (set in Cuba but filmed in Puerto Rico)
- Bananas
- Barricada
- Battle of Blood Island
- Bazooka: Las Batallas de Wilfredo Gómez (documentary on legendary Puerto Rican boxer Wilfredo Gómez)
- Behind Enemy Lines: Colombia
- El Beso que me Diste
- Brenda Starr
- Broche de Oro

== C ==
- La Caja de Problemas
- The Caller
- Caña brava
- El Cantante, starring Marc Anthony and Jennifer Lopez
- Captain America: Civil War
- Captain Ron
- Captain Typhoon
- Casi Casi
- Castro's Daughter
- Cat Chaser (an Abel Ferrara film, with Puerto Rico substituting for the Dominican Republic)
- Cayo
- Che!
- Che 1ep
- La Chica del lunes
- Chiringa
- Chona, la puerca asesina (a television movie produced by Sunshine Logroño)
- Chona 2, la puerca asesina (a sequel television movie produced by Ariel Annexy)
- Christian y Cristal
- Christmas in Paradise
- Chrysalis (El Yunque, PR)
- El Cimarrón
- El Clown
- Las Combatientes (television movie, winner of the Spirit of Moondance Award at the Moondance Film Festival, starring Alba Nydia Díaz)
- Command Approved
- Commandments
- Con la Musica por Dentro
- Conexión Caribe
- Contact (radar scene filmed in Arecibo)
- Coralito Tiene Dos Maridos
- Corazon Salvaje
- Correa Cotto, starring Pedro Cabrera and Arturo Correa
- Creature from the Haunted Sea
- El Crimen de la Hacienda
- Cuando Acaba la Noche
- El cuento del Gallo Pelon
- Culebra
- El Curandero del Pueblo

== D ==
- De la Mano de un Angel
- Death Academy
- The Delta Factor
- El Derecho de Comer, starring Lissette
- Desamores
- El Dia que Llegaron
- Los Diaz de Doris
- Die Mexico Connection
- Digger 3D
- Dinero Sangre
- Dios Los Cria by Jacobo Morales
- Dios Los Cria II (2004) by Jacobo Morales
- Dirty Dancing: Havana Nights (2004) (set in Cuba, but filmed in Puerto Rico)
- The Disappearance of Garcia Lorca
- Do Over, The
- Doña Ana

== E ==
- Elmendof
- Enredando Sombras (documentary on Latin American cinema, with a segment by Jacobo Morales)
- Entre los Dioses del Desprecio
- El Escuadron del Panico
- El Tesoro del Yunque
- Executive Decision
- Los Expatriados

== F ==
- The Face at the Window
- El Falso Heredero
- Fascination
- Fascination Amour, starring Andy Lau
- Fast Five
- Feel The Noise
- La Fiebre del Deseo
- Flesh Wounds
- Flight of Fancy
- Flight of the Lost Balloon
- The Food of the Gods
- For the Love or Country (The Arturo Sandoval Story)
- Frankenstein Meets the Spacemonster
- Frankie, Desde la Calle
- Fray Dolar
- Frente al Destino
- The Frogmen

== G ==
- Gitmo
- GoldenEye (radio telescope scene filmed in Arecibo, beach and US Marines ambush scenes filmed in Manati, Puerto Rico, BMW and plane exchange scene filmed in Vega Baja)
- Guitarra Mia (documentary and tribute to José Feliciano)

== H ==
- Heartbreak Ridge (filmed in Vieques) representing Grenada.
- Helen Can Wait
- Héroes de Otra Patria
- Una Historia Comun
- The Hoax (filmed in San Juan, Fajardo, and Rio Grande)
- Hola Gente, Hola Mundo, musical and ecological documentary filmed between Costa Rica and Puerto Rico

== I ==
- I Witness
- Illegal Tender
- Imprisoned
- In The Shadow
- Into the Air: A Kiteboarding Experience
- Islands in the Stream

== J ==
- Jacob's Ladder
- La Jaula
- El Jibarito Rafael
- Juicio contra un Angel
- Julia, Todo en Mi
- Juntos, In Any Way

== K ==
- "King of Sorrow" (music video) by Sade
- Kings of South Beach

== L ==
- Ladrones y Mentirosos (also known as Thieves and Liars for the U.S. festival circuit)
- Latin Comedy: Una Comedia de Derecha para un Publico de Izquierda by Janet Alvarez Gonzalez, starring Pucho Fernández
- Last Flight Out
- Last Woman on Earth (a Roger Corman movie)
- Libertad Para la Juventud, starring Chucho Avellanet
- Life During Wartime
- Linda Sara by Jacobo Morales
- Lo que le pasó a Santiago by Jacobo Morales, nominated for a Best Foreign Language Film Oscar
- Loco por ellas
- Lord of the Flies (filmed in Vieques)
- The Losers
- Luisa Capetillo: Pasion de Justicia
- Luna de Miel en Condominio
- Luna de Miel en Puerto Rico

== M ==
- Ma Femme Me Quitte
- Macbeth (The Caribbean Macbeth)
- Machuchal Agente 'O' en New York
- The Maiden Hesit (beach scenes)
- Maldeamores
- La Maldicion de Mi Raza
- The Man from O.R.G.Y.
- Man With My Face
- Manhattan Merengue!
- Manuela y Manuel
- Maruja, starring Marta Romero and Axel Anderson
- Mas Alla del Limite
- Maten el Leon
- Meant to Be
- The Men Who Stare At Goats
- Mi Aventura en Puerto Rico
- Mi Dia de Suerte
- Mi Verano con Amanda
- Milagro en Yauco
- Millonario a Go Go
- Misterio en la isla de los monstruos
- Monster Island
- La Mujer del Gato
- Una Mujer sin Precio

== N ==
- Never Say Die
- The New Swiss Family Robinson
- Nicolas y los Demas by Jacobo Morales
- The Noah
- Noches Prohibidas

== O ==
- Ocho Puertas
- One Hot Summer
- One Tree Hill – Season 8, Ep. 21
- Operacion Tiburon
- El Otro Camino
- Outside the Law

== P ==
- Paging Emma
- The Painting (combat jungle scenes)
- Los Peloteros
- The Perez Family
- The Perfect Getaway
- La Piel Desnuda
- Pirates of the Caribbean: On Stranger Tides (castle scene filmed in El Morro, Old San Juan; tiny island scene filmed in Palominito Island, off the coast of Fajardo)
- Preciosa
- Princess Protection Program
- The Private Navy of Sgt. O'Farrell (the original, 1968)
- Prohibido Amar en Nueva York, starring Charytín and Julio Alemán
- Puerto Rico
- Puerto Rico en Carnaval
- The Punisher

== Q ==
- Q&A (1990, Sidney Lumet)

== R ==
- Replicas
- The Reaping
- El Reporte
- Romance en Puerto Rico
- Ruby
- The Rum Diary
- Ruptura
- Runner Runner

== S ==
- Saint of Devil's Island
- Santa Cristal
- Seeds of Evil
- Sex and the College Girl
- A Show of Force
- Sian Ka'an
- The Singer
- Slayer
- The Social Reckoning
- Species
- Stiletto
- Stop
- Stranded
- El Sueño del Regreso
- Sunstorm
- The Survivor

== T ==
- Taínos
- Talento de Barrio
- Tango Bar, starring Raúl Juliá and Valeria Lynch
- Tanya's Island
- Teen Beach Movie
- Thunder Island
- Trapped
- Los Tres Pecados*Toxic Shark*

== U ==
- Una Aventura Llamada Menudo
- Under Suspicion
- Undercurrent, with Lorenzo Lamas

== V ==
- Vanished (Lifetime original movie, set on fictional island of San Carlos)
- Via Cruces Playero
- La Virgen de la Calle

== W ==
- When the Girls Take Over
- Weekend Warriors (filmed in Loiza)
- Wizards of Waverly Place: The Movie
- Wuthering Heights (filmed in Cabo Rojo)

== Y ==
- Yellow
- Yo Creo en Santa Claus (I believe in Santa Claus), a television movie broadcast by Televicentro, December 25, 2004, and January 1, 2005, produced by Leo Fernandez III, starring Lorel Crespo and Lou Briel
- Yo soy Boricua, pa'que tu lo sepas!
- El Yugo

== See also ==
- List of films based on location
- List of Puerto Rican films
