= List of Puerto Rican submissions for the Academy Award for Best International Feature Film =

Best International Feature Film submissions from Puerto Rico

Highlights
- Debut: 1986
- Submissions: 12
- Nominations: 1
- Oscar winners: none
- Final submission: 2011

Puerto Rico, an unincorporated territory of the United States, is among the one hundred countries that have submitted films for the Academy Award for Best International Feature Film. (Note: The category was previously named the Academy Award for Best Foreign Language Film, but this was changed to the Academy Award for Best International Feature Film in April 2019, after the Academy deemed the word "Foreign" to be outdated.) The award is handed out annually by the United States Academy of Motion Picture Arts and Sciences to a feature-length motion picture produced outside the United States that contains primarily non-English dialogue. The Puerto Rican nominee was selected by the Corporación de Cine de Puerto Rico.

Puerto Rico submitted twelve films from 1986 to 2011, and was nominated only once for What Happened to Santiago (1989).

However, the territory is no longer allowed to submit films due to the Academy altering its rules in the 2010s, disqualifying any film solely produced by American companies or territory protectorates.

== Submissions ==
Every year, each country is invited by the Academy of Motion Picture Arts and Sciences to submit its best film for the Academy Award for Best International Feature Film. The International Feature Film Committee oversees the process and reviews all the submitted films. Following this, they vote via secret ballot to determine the five nominees for the award.

In 2008, the producers of local box-office hit Talento de Barrio protested that they submitted their film for consideration, but that Puerto Rico's film board chose not to send a film that year.

All films submitted are primary in Spanish. Below is a list of the films that have been submitted by Puerto Rico for review by the academy for the award by year and the respective Academy Awards ceremony.

Year (Ceremony)	English title	Original title	Director(s)	Result
1986 (59th)	The Great Party	La gran fiesta	Marcos Zurinaga	Not nominated
1988 (61st)	Tango Bar		Marcos Zurinaga	Not nominated
1989 (62nd)	What Happened to Santiago	Lo que le pasó a Santiago	Jacobo Morales	Nominated
1994 (67th)	Linda Sara		Jacobo Morales	Not nominated
1998 (71st)	Heroes from Another Country	Héroes de Otra Patria	Iván Dariel Ortíz	Not nominated
2001 (74th)	12 Hours	12 horas	Raúl Marchand-Sánchez	Not nominated
2005 (78th)	Cayo		Vicente Juarbe	Not nominated
2006 (79th)	Thieves and Liars	Ladrones y mentirosos	Ricardo Méndez Matta	Not nominated
2007 (80th)	Maldeamores		Mariem Perez & Carlitos Ruiz	Not nominated
2009 (82nd)	Kabo & Platon		Edmundo H. Rodriguez	Not nominated
2010 (83rd)	Miente		Rafi Mercado	Not nominated
2011 (84th)	America		Sonia Fritz	Disqualified
