= Cinema of Puerto Rico =

Romance Tropical is the first Puerto Rican film with sound and the second Spanish-speaking film in the world.

The history of the Cinema industry in Puerto Rico predates Hollywood, being conceived after the first industries emerged in some locations of the United States, Switzerland, Denmark, Italy, France, Great Britain and Germany. During the US invasion of the island in 1898, American soldiers brought cameras to record what they saw. By 1912, Puerto Ricans would begin to produce their own films. After the early images recorded by the American soldiers in 1898, most of the films produced in the island were documentaries. It wasn't until 1912 that Rafael Colorado D'Assoy recorded the first non-documentary film titled Un drama en Puerto Rico. After that, Colorado and Antonio Capella Martínez created the Film Industrial Society of Puerto Rico in 1916, producing their first film titled Por la hembra y el gallo. Other film companies formed during the time were the Tropical Film Company (1917) and the Porto Rico Photoplays (1919). Puerto Rico was the second Latin American market to produce a sound film, filming Luis Pales Matos's script for Romance Tropical (1934). The film featured Jorge Rodríguez, Raquel and Ernestina Canino, Sixto Chevremont and Cándida de Lorenzo. In the late 1930s Rafael Cobián produced films starring Blanca de Castejón such as Mis dos amores and Los hijos mandan at Hollywood. In 1951, he would produce Mi doble with San Juan as its setting. Mapy and Fernando Cortés would also participate in the Hollywood industry, as well as throughout Latin America.

1986's La gran fiesta was the first attempt to formally compete in the Academy Awards. Starting in the late 1990s the Puerto Rican film industry saw significant growth and the number of local productions has been on the increase every year. The island has produced several actors and actresses and one Academy Award nominated film (see List of Puerto Rican Academy Award winners and nominees). A number of Puerto Rican actors and actresses, led by José Ferrer and Rita Moreno, also established themselves in the foreign film industries.

== History ==
=== Early years: 1912–1950 ===
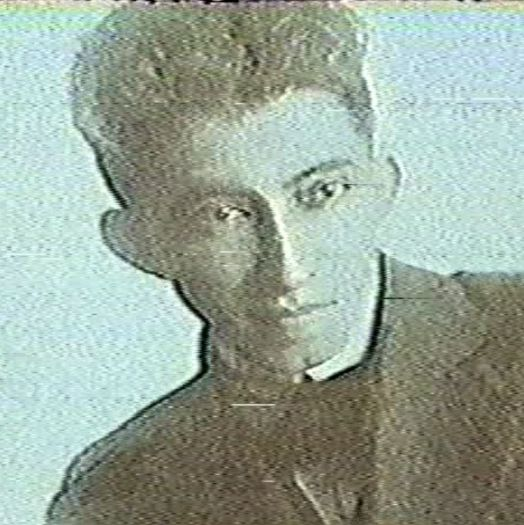
Juan Emilio Viguié Cajas, pioneer in Puerto Rico's film industry

Cinema was first introduced to the island in limited form during the late 19th Century following the Spanish–American War, with the military action during it reportedly being filmed as well. In 1899, Sigmund Lubin filmed a nationalistic recreation of the Puerto Rican Campaign titled Capture of Porto Rico as part of a series on the war, of which no copies are known to survive The first showings depended on early technology like the Lumiere and Pathé projectors and were temporary in nature, touring the island and leaving to other markets. It proved popular with the public, especially children. The first full films shown were reportedly brought by European circuses and gypsy tropes. In 1918, Hollywood Pathé Exchange used the island to film After 20 years Puerto Rico.

In 1909, local company Cine Pathé also held tours throughout the island led by Rafael Colorado and Conrado Asenjo, the latter of whom would later take charge and rename it Cine Puerto Rico. Prior to the production of local films, most of those shown were of European origin. By this year, the business had spread and permanent theaters had appeared at various municipalities including San Juan, Mayagüez and Ponce. Some cinemas were established in municipalities like San Juan and Ponce. The first attempt took place in 1912, when Juan Emilio Viguié began filming the daily life of the Ponceños with a Pathé camera. His films were shown at Cine Habana, where he worked and producing them required a revelation technique that he invented. Francisco Maymón made the second attempt, beginning a film based on the legends surrounding pirate captain Roberto Cofresí, but complications prevented the culmination of the project. Rafael Colorado, the owner of the first film rental on the island, would create the first film of its class when he filmed Un drama en Puerto Rico, which was able to recover its $700 investment in its first showing. These early attempts gathered general interest and lead to the formal creation of a local film industry, leading to the creation of the Sociedad Industrial Cine Puerto Rico in March 1916. Its creators, Colorado and Antonio Capella would employ actual jíbaros in their country film, Por la hembra y por el gallo, as had been the case in the former's first production. The film debuted at Cine Tres Banderas with tickets being sold at 50 cents. This company would produce religious film El milagro de la Virgen, Mafia en Puerta de Tierra, among others. However, insufficient funding and foreign competition lead to the ceasing of functions. Colorado was also involved in the filming of political activities involving José de Diego and Luis Muñoz Rivera.

By 1912, Colorado produced Un drama en Puerto Rico which became the first drama and scripted film. The producer and businessman had previously filmed short news films in the early 1910s. That year, Cecil B. de Mille filmed several shorts at Ponce. In 1917, the Tropical Film Company was created, featuring people such as Luis Llorens Torres, Nemesio Canales and director Ernesto López, it acquired the equipment from its predecessor and incorporated Colorado. This company was incorporated with the intent of competing with other markets and attracting tourism by featuring local attractions. Llorens Torres directed Paloma del Monte with Gabriel Tejel as lead actor, with a number of jíbaros and two Italian performers of the Zorda family in support. Comedies featuring local actors such as Bety Varezal, were also filmed during this period. A project named La viudita se quiere casar followed. During the filming of El tesoro de Cofresí Aquiles Zorda, the patriarch of the family, returned to Italy for personal reasons and the project was cancelled. The political conflicts of the era complicated the purchase of new film and the company ceased operations as a consequence. Swashbuckling was a popular genre, with the life of pirate Roberto Cofresí being a recurrent topic. Prior to joining Tropical Films, Rafael Colorado had begun the production of Los misterios de Cofresí. Following further studies and experience abroad, Viguié returned in 1919 and began another project about the pirate captain, this one starring Lino Corretjer, which was left inconclusive. Afterwards, Viguié joined the nascent Puerto Rico Photoplay, filming for the American public projects such as The Woman that Fool Herself (May Allison, Robert Ellis, Frank Currie) and El hijo del desierto. The company ceased functions after owner Enrique González was involved in disagreements with his family over it.

This era was a difficult one to produce in Puerto Rico, due to its political status, the poverty that it brought and a skeptical approach from the local higher classes, securing capital proved a challenge to the nascent industry. The limitations of the Motion Pictures Patents a Company also prevented the export of local material abroad. The impact of World War I on the production of silver nitrate was also responsible for limiting materials. The dissolution of the MPPC in 1917 did nothing to benefit the local industry, since the open market and the proliferation of Hollywood benefitted larger and established companies with which the young locals could not compete. Another fire destroyed the studios found at Calle San José, forcing SICPR to relocate to another part of Old San Juan, Calle Fortaleza. A fire destroyed resources, equipment and films in 1917. The first films were directed towards the local public and its topic remained relevant to local affairs. Around 25 films were produced (of which nearly a dozen were fully scripted) during this early stage. However, most of the films and material from this era has been lost.

In 1919, an independent company filmed The Sacloir of the Hills in Puerto Rico. Based in Hato Rey, Porto Rico Photoplays was born of a joint investment by Puerto Rican investors led by Enrique and Eduardo González and George McManus. Its studios were built in 1920 and contemporary notes state that they rivaled those of New York. PRP produced romance drama Amor Tropical (also known as Cumbre de oro and Pinacho de oro) in 1921, filming in Loíza and in its studios. In 1922, PRP also produced El hijo del desierto (a.k.a. Tents of Allah), in which an airplane engine was used to simulate a desert storm. A number of short lived magazines emerged to cover the industry. By the 1920s, theaters had proliferated throughout the island. In 1924, FPL filmed Paramount's Aloma of the South Seas at Piñones, the first non-documentary Hollywood production to do so. In 1941, a remake featured Evelyn Del Río in a supporting role. Viguié participated in the project as cameraman. He would begin the production of documentaries such as La colectiva and La malaria (the first of its kind to detail the progression of the disease), also making arrangements to introduce technicolor to the market two years later. The plot of Warner Brothers' 1927 The Climbers centers around Puerto Rico, but it is unknown if some of it was filmed locally. In 1939, 20th Century Fox filmed Mr. Moto in Puerto Rico (also known as Mr. Moto in Danger Island). Decades later, Henry Silva would portray the character of Mr. Moto in a reboot. The plot of 1942's Au Large de Porto Rico (also known as Ship Ahoy) centers on transporting a magnetic bomb to Puerto Rico, but it is unknown if some was filmed on the island.

The Tropical Film Company was founded by two intellectuals in the National Independence Movement and a veteran filmmaker that immigrated to Puerto Rico from Spain. Even though it is known that this company had produced four films, none of them have been retrieved. This however does not negate the founding base of the Tropical Film Company in Puerto Rican Cinema. It was through Tropical Film Company that the first discourses of educational, cultural, and economic aims were made within the limitations of financial and infrastructural resources that existed then, and still persist, for locally grounded cinematic production, distribution and exhibition in Puerto Rico. In 1934, Viguié produced and directed the first Puerto Rican film with sound titled, Romance Tropical. At a budget of $10,000, it was a hit at San Juan, but Viguié sold the rights after the father of the Canino sisters demanded more money, leaving the full-length film business after paying an investor. It became the second sound film in Spanish to be distributed internationally. Romance Tropical set a record at Campoamor Theatre in New York. Distributed by Latina Picture Corporation, rights conflicts prevented the continuation of a series of pending projects and the negotiations of an agreement with MGM. During the 1930s, Viguié began filming sound films of a number of interviews and events, with some of the productions being preserved at the General Archive of Puerto Rico. Theatre owners such as Teodulo Llamas and Rafael Ramos Cobián were also involved in the growth of the industry. Local personalities continued being cast in foreign films, such as Ramón Rivero Diplo and Myrta Silva inUna Gallega en la Habana.

=== 1950s–1960s ===
External videos
- 1953's movie Los Peloteros on YouTube
- Una Gallega en la Habana on YouTube

No scripted films were produced during World War II. The Extensión de Servicios Agrícolas produced several documentaries covered with music by Rafael Hernández, some historical and cultural, but with agricultural motives. Immediately after the end of the war, the government sponsored Querer es Poder (1945). In May 1949, DIVEDCO was created through law No. 372 and placed in change of the Public Instruction Department. The government also funded La Rehabilitación del Obrero Lisiado (1950) and A Girl from Puerto Rico (1953). The latter of these films reportedly received some consideration from the Academy Awards. In 1946, it also brought in Johhny Farnow to create a documentary. The División de Educación de la Comunidad (DIVEDCO) a government agency with a stated purpose of educating the population began producing films in 1949. Invested in an industrialization surge, the administration used these also for propaganda akin to that used by the Canadian National Film Board. The entity produced 38 films during the next fourteen years, some of which were exported. Several Puerto Rican directors graduated from this initiative, during which they worked along Delano and Willard Van Dyke among others. Los peloteros filmed in 1951 and featuring Ramón Rivero Diplo was its first non-documentary film. The following year, Amílcar Tirado's Una voz en la montaña was recognized at the Edinburg and Venetia Film Festivals. In 1953, the director's El puente would receive honorable mentions at festivals in Europe. In 1955, DIVEDCO produced 10 films. Women's right advocacy film Modesta (a.k.a. La huelga de las mujeres) received the first prize for a short scripted film at the Venetia Film Festival the following year. Tirado would direct El Santero (in collaboration with Ángel Rivera) and Cuando los padres olvidan (his first in 35 mm), with the second being shown in three European film festivals. Luis Maysonet's Intolerancia (1959) was the final feature film produced by DIVEDCO. This director would also complete slavery El resplandor two years later. Jack Delano and Edwin Rosskam were brought in for an educational project, which also trained several local figures in the medium, producing Una gota de agua (1947), Desde las nubes (1948) and Las manos del hombre.

Between 1946 and 1969, over 60 foreign projects were filmed at Puerto Rico, mostly by American and Latin American producers motivated by the end of Hollywood's golden age. These included noir The man with my Face (a.k.a. Mi doble), Machete (which cast Juano Hernández), Crowded Paradise (with Miriam Colón), Counterplot, Season of Madness, Last Woman on Earth and Battle Cry (which cast Perry López), La chica del lunes, Lord of the Fliesd and The private Navy of Sgt. O'Farrell. Flying Nun (1967) and Che were partially filmed. For his filming of 1953's Escombros and 1957's Tres vidas en el recuerdo, New York-based Rolando Barreras organized a heavily Puerto Rican cast, with the second completely depending on local talent. Two years later, he produced romance drama Entre Dios y el hombre, his first project filmed at Puerto Rico. The first truly Puerto Rican film, Los Peloteros (1953), featured a Puerto Rican cast and was based on a real story. Ramón Rivero (Diplo) starred as the inspirational coach of a children's baseball team. His impoverished team played with old, broken equipment and longed for uniforms. Known as a comedian, the role enabled Rivero to demonstrate his dramatic abilities. The children in the movie were not professional actors; they actually were poor children cast at the shooting locale. Photographer Jack Delano directed the film for the Puerto Rican government's Division of Community Education.

In 1957, Producciones Borinquen (PROBO Films) was created by Víctor Arrillaga, Axel Anderson and Jerónimo Mitchell as a cooperative between actors and other personnel. The following year, the company produced Maruja starring Mario Pabón and Marta Romero among other native talents, which was exhibited at the Río Hondo Film Festival. Two years later, the company produced El Otro Camino, facing distribution issues which only allowed it a three-day showing due to the bankruptcy of the distributor. Two decades later, some copies that were casually found were restored by Guadalupe Gúzman and shown at the ICP with the collaboration of José Artemio Torres. A splinter from PROBO would produce Palmer ha muerto in 1961, featuring Ricardo Palmerola and Helena Montalban. René Martinez would also produce Así baila Puerto Rico in 1960. Axel Anderson was a German ex-patriate who became a star in both Puerto Rican television and film. In Maruja, Anderson played opposite leading lady, Marta Romero, and in El Otro Camino he played opposite Rosaura Andreu, future children's television host. A third movie was the American film noir Man With My Face (1951), a thriller centering on Americans living in Puerto Rico. Producer J. Harold Odell shot three films on the island, Machete, Counterplot, and Fiend of Dope Island. In 1956, Modesta, a short film produced within the island's Division of Community Education, won the Best Short Film Award at the Venice Film Festival; in 1998, Modesta became the first Puerto Rican film named to the United States National Film Registry. In 1963, Almílcar Tirado founded the Asociación de Productores Cinematográficos.

Maruja

Ultimately, commercialization would fuel the expansion of the medium. Most of the 63 films produced during the 1960s would be directed towards the Latin Americans in New York, which made most of them failed gambles. Co-productions with Latin American and European companies also targeted those markets. The decade, however, was difficult for producers and by 1968, only around 20% of the films had gathered enough success to break even and record earnings.

In 1961, Mario Pabón directed Obsesión. Romantic musicals would be a recurrent failure, beginning with René Martínez's Carnaval en Puerto Rico. Television personality Paquito Cordero debuted in cinema with PAKIRA Films producing Tres puertorriqueñas y un deseo. A saga of comedic films centering around Adalberto Rodríguez's Machuchal character was the produced including El alcalde de Machuchal (1964), El jíbaro millonario or Millonario a go-go (1965), Machuchal agente 0 or Machuchal en Nueva York (1966) and El curandero del pueblo (1968). PAKIRA also produced En mi Viejo San Juan (1966), Luna de more en Puerto Rico (1967) and two films directed by Fernando Cortés in Mexico. Codazos led by Osvaldo Agüero debuted with Con los pies descalzos (1961) before moving to television. Damián Rosa would produce and co-produce films that were exhibited in foreign markets, such as romantic film Romance en Puerto Rico (1961). After gathering success with this film, he produced another hit in drama Lamento borincano (1962). Rosa would then join José Díaz and co-produce military drama Nuestro regimiento (1964) and drama Cuando quiere un borincano (1967), neither of which achieved the same success. 1966's romantic drama Bello amanecer (1964) and thriller Mientras Puerto Rico duerme did well at the box office. Rosa would then produce El jíbarito Rafael(1968) based on the life of Rafael Hernández, which gathered favorable reviews but fared poorly in sales.

Barreras would also produce Huellas (1961) and La canción del Caribe (1963). Cooperativa de Artes Cinematográficas only managed to produce two films including Más allá del capitolio (directed by Tirado) after the film failed to meet projections and loss money. PROBO alumni Jerónimo Mitchell would create Mitchell Productions and produce melodramas Vencedora de Amor and Amor perdóname, noir Heroína, detective film La venganza de Correa Cotto and a film adaptation of hit television series La criada malcriada. Tony Felton would produce detective film Aroch y Clemente (directed by Miguel Ángel Alvarez) to close the decade. Correa Cotto was also the subject of Argentinian Orestes Trucco's Correa Cotto: Así me llaman. The film sold around 1.5 million, but was also subjected to a lawsuit by actress Betty Ortega. Trucco Productions would also release a drama titled Miami in 1967.

Spaniard Juan Orol produced several films throughout the decade, including El crimen de la hacienda (1963), La maldición de mi raza (1964), Organización criminal (1968), Pasiones infernales Historia de un gangster (1968). His other productions La virgen de la calle (1965), Contrabandistas del caribe (1966) and Antesala de la silla eléctrica (1966) were filmed in part locally. In 1968, Arturo Correa would produce the comedy El derecho de comer, which was sponsored by Fomento Económico.

During the 1960s, several short films were produced in Puerto Rico including Efraín López Neris's El Corral (1963), Amílcar Tirado's Zapatos nuevos (1963), Ramón Barco's Angela (1966) and Maggie Bob's Laguna Soltero (1967). José Soltero engaged in experimental cinema with El pecado original (1964) and Jeroví (1965). DIVEDCO's Amilcar Tirado directed Mitchell Productions and Columbia Pictures' Ayer amargo (1960). After his political comedy El gallo pelón was met with controversy, he incursioned into mainstream cinema, eventually returning with La noche de Don Manuel (1965). DIVEDCO would experience a sharp decline, with Tirado as its main director and Ricardo Alegría's script of La buena herencia (1967) being among the last before it systematically disappeared following the change in administration that took place the following year. Its format would later be adopted in Cuba's Cine-móvil and Nicaragua's INCINE. Of the collection of over 137 films, several are preserved at the General Archive. A government sponsored initiative, TURABOX, produced La venganza de Margarito. Founded in 1968, Cine Pueblo began filming projects of social interest, including Los barrios se oponen an environmentalist piece about mining in Puerto Rico.

Co-productions with foreign producers were common during this decade and actors involved in these markets were also involved in their production. Fernando Cortés would produce Mr. Dollar (1964), En mi Viejo San Juan (1966), La mujer del cura (1967) and Vírgenes a go-go (1967). Jorge Mistral produced La fiebre del deseo (1964) and La piel desnuda (1964). Other include Alfredo B. Crevenna's Una mujer sin precio (1965), Juventud sin frenos (1965) written by Tony Rigus, Alfonso Corona's Las pecadoras (1967) and Juan Bueno's Mulato (1967). Spain was a frequent collaborator leading to the production of Sebastián Almeida's Vacio en el alma, Federico Curiel's Juicio a un ángel, José Díaz Morales' Los que nunca amaron (1965) and Miguel Marayta's Joselito vagabundo puertorriqueño. Mexico was another, leading to co-productions such as Cuando los salvajes aman, Operación Tiburón (1965, Mexico) by José San Antón and Braulio Castillo, Morir en Puerto Rico and Preciosa. 1965's Caña Brava was a collaboration between local and Dominican investors. Ramón Peón produced Bajo el cielo de Puerto Rico. Argentinian producers also participated in this exchange with Aldo Sambrell producing La última jugada and Leopoldo Torres La Chica del Lunes and Los traidores de San Ángel. Also notable are the Bob Hope comedy The Private Navy of Sgt. O'Farrell (1968) when Hawaii was unavailable for Department of Defense cooperation and a film adaptation of William Golding's novel Lord of the Flies.

=== 1970s–1980s ===
During the 1970s, changes in the markets and costs combined with the emergence of new technologies, mixed with social unrest to impact the cinema industry. In Puerto Rico, skepticism by potential investors lead to a shift from the commercial to the documental, influenced by political topics. Publicity and independent productions were able to reach more notoriety than the production of feature films. The Movimiento Pro Independencia entered the medium to produce a number of pro-independence films including one about the political status named Puerto Rico, paraíso invadido (1977) and another about proposed development in the natural reserve of Mona named Denuncia de un embeleco (1975).

Sandino Filmes, named after Augusto Sandino, had been funded in the late 1960s by Diego de la Texera, Ellen Gordon, Roberto Gándara, Alfredo Matías and Antonio Rosario, filming publicity to fund its documentaries. The company grew with the integration of several figures including Marcos Zurinaga, Luis Collazo, Alfonso Borrell and Luis Soto. Completing a documentary about Sandino himself, the company also produced Culebra (1971), Piñones va (1972), Julia de Burgos (1974) and Alicia Alonso y el Ballet Nacional de Cuba (1979), but left several projects inconcluse. Sandino also participated in the production of Roberto Ponce's A Step Away (1980) and a two episodes for Realidades named GI José II (military) and Ochú (about the Caribbean religion of santería). The company also participated in the filming of foreign films such as Maten al león and Dino Di Laurentis' Triumph. Sandino ceased to exist with the turn of the decade due to internal issues. In 1979, Texera went on to film the activities of the Salvadoran guerrilla for a documentary titled El Salvador vencerá.

During the 1970s, at least 24 full-length films were produced. Betty Ortega was cast by Tony Felton in several films, first to depicting the life of Luisa Nevarez Ortiz in his eponymous 1970 film, later personifying a fictional nationalist in La masacre de Ponce (loosely based on that historical event) and then the romantic melodrama La Tormenta. Felton and collaborators Erick Santamaría and Tony Betancourt later produced El barrio, Hijos del vicio and Yeyo (1975). During this decade, Rosa would produce the comedy Fray Dollar (1970) with the collaboration of Vic Winner and Columbia Pictures and Adiós, Nueva York, adiós (1974) which flopped and ultimately distanced him from cinema after collaborating in the foreign co-production La noche de San Juan (1975). Arturo Correa produced musical drama Libertad para la juventud (1970) and romantic drama Tú mi amor (1971).

Rubén Galindo produced the romantic musical Un amante anda suelto (1970), another co-production with Mexican interests. In 1974, Creative Films joined forces with Mexican Cineproducciones Internacionales to produce El hijo de Angela María and placed Fernando Cortés as director. This was WKAQ-TV's final film under this company, gathering economic success but receiving unfavorable reviews. In 1975, Tony Rigus filmed the romantic drama The machos in English, which won an award at the Cartagena a Film Festival. The media presence of criminal Antonio García López (also known as Toño Bicicleta) led to competition between producers to secure rights and a number of low-budget films that received only limited release. In 1974, Cine Centro de Puerto Rico produced El fujitivo de Puerto Rico (Héctor Rosario, Betty López), which despite its intentionally amateurish approach gained some success in New York. The incapacity of the Puerto Rico Police to capture the fugitive also had impact abroad, where two films began production by César Córdoba (in Guatemala) and Anthony Felton (in the Dominican Republic), of which only the second's Toño Bicicleta was completed. Dominicans Glaucoma del Mar and Víctor Hugo López produced La leyenda de Toño Bicicleta starring Colón Riozama and Alida Arizmendi among others.

The United States produced more films in Puerto Rico in the 1970s than any other country did. Most of them were schlock movies typical of the time, such as producer Sydney W. Pink's last movie The Man from O.R.G.Y. (1970). The Woody Allen film Bananas, of 1971, is the only classic American film of the time to be filmed in Puerto Rico. Jacobo Morales played a supporting role on the film. Among local productions, Jacobo Morales's film Dios los Cría (1979) stands out. Morales had a solid background as an actor and writer, going back to the inception of Puerto Rican television in the 1950s. Dios los Cria marked the beginning of his work writing and directing for the big screen. The collection of five comedic tales earned him acclaim, as well as a slot in the 'Un Certain Regard' section of the 1979 Cannes Film Festival. Following up on his previous success, Morales has continued to write and direct his own films. Nicolas y los Demas (1986) and Lo que le Pasó a Santiago (1989) both won audience appreciation. In addition, the latter received an Oscar nomination for Best Foreign Film. In 1994, he directed Linda Sara which didn't earn as much respect as his earlier works, although it's generally considered enjoyable. In 2004, he released a sequel to his 1979 hit, Dios los Cria 2.

During the 1980s, Puerto Rican began submitting films for consideration to the Academy Award for Best Foreign Film. Some of the films submitted were La Gran Fiesta and the above-mentioned Lo que le Pasó a Santiago. Despite these efforts, the industry wasn't booming like before. Una Aventura Llamada Menudo was a local film that gained international success during 1982, thanks in part to it being starred by Menudo, a teen idol band of the time. Menudo had participated in another film, the Puerto Rican-Venezuelan production Menudo: La Pelicula in 1981, but La Pelicula was filmed entirely in Venezuela. Meanwhile, Menudo's main competitor, another teen-idol boy band named Los Chicos de Puerto Rico, participated in a movie named "Coneccion Caribe", which was filmed in both Puerto Rico and the Dominican Republic.

In 1991, Jacobo Morales won the ACE Best Director Award for Lo que le pasó a Santiago. Tony Martínez would create the Instituto de Cine y Televisión de Puerto Rico.

=== 1990s–2000s ===
During the early 1990s, production of full-length film was inconsistent. In 1991, DIVEDCO produced its last film Art and identity. About 112 of the entity's productions are preserved by the ICP and at the Cornell University Library. Other initiatives built during the 1970s, such as dubbing studies, began closing. The early to mid-1990s had Paramount Pictures' A Show of Force, whose cast included Amy Irving, Robert Duvall, Andy García, and Kevin Spacey; La Guagua Aérea, the aforementioned Linda Sara, and El Poder del Shakti as theatrical releases on the island. 1997 brought Robert Zemeckis and his team to the island to shoot sequences for Contact and Steven Spielberg for a 2-day shoot for Amistad. 1998 had theatrical releases for the well-received Héroes de Otra Patria and for the not-as-well-received Mi Día de Suerte, as well as a limited release for The Face at the Window. 1999 had the theatrical premiere, but not a general theatrical release, for the English-language Paging Emma. In 1998, Modesta was recognized by the National Film Registry's Preseevation Board. Una voz en la montaña was awarded in the Edinburg Film Festival. El Puente won an honorific mention in the same festival.

By 2000, the Ateneo Puertorriqueño estimated that around 10% of the films produced or filmed in Puerto Rico were missing, the rest being part of their collection and distributed under the Cine Nuestro label. During this decade, another filmmaking boom began. 12 Horas enjoyed a decent, six-week theatrical run in 2001, and ever since then, the number of films made by Puerto Ricans has increased dramatically. So has the variety, including documentaries, short films, and animation. Voces inocentes (2004) co-produced by Mexico, Puerto Rico, and the United States, won several international awards. Both the Puerto Rico Film Commission and the Corporation for the Development of Arts, Science and Film Industry in Puerto Rico promote local and international film making, including loans and financial incentives.

Other recent films that have garnered praise are Celestino y el Vampiro, Ladrones y Mentirosos, Cayo, and Jacobo Morales' Angel. Unfortunately, people in Puerto Rico see most of these films as art house material and they don't get the box office reception as many American mainstream films.

One notable exception to this trend of lukewarm reception at the box office occurred with the film Maldeamores. Starting with its sold-out, one-week Oscar-qualifying run in late 2007, this film became a benchmark in Puerto Rican cinema for its combination of excellent critical reception, decent box office reception, and actual theatrical exhibition in the U.S. Nevertheless, in July 2009 the Puerto Rico Film Commission reported that Maldeamores had only recovered about 50% of its costs.

In 2008, director Steven Soderbergh and actor – producer Benicio del Toro filmed most of the first part of Che on the island; and George Clooney, Jeff Bridges, and Kevin Spacey (working in the island once more) shot The Men Who Stare at Goats. Also in 2008, the film Talento de Barrio, a movie based on the life of "Daddy Yankee", became the first Puerto Rican film to sell more than 300,000 tickets during its theatrical run, even though its critical reception was decidedly on the "rotten" side of the spectrum.

In 2009, Party Time: The Movie, directed by Juan Fernandez-Paris, Miente (Lie), directed and production-designed by Rafi Mercado, and Kabo y Platon directed by Edmundo H. Rodríguez, received theatrical releases. Also, Johnny Depp visited the island to work in The Rum Diary and Joel Silver took advantage of available incentives to shoot most of The Losers.

=== 2010s–present ===
The year 2010 saw theatrical releases for Que Despelote, directed by Eduardo 'Transfor' Ortiz; Elite, directed by Andres Ramírez Molina, and Caos, directed by Raul García, and also saw the island serve as a production hub for a significant portion of Fast Five.

2011 was a somewhat tumultuous year for the film industry in Puerto Rico. It included a decision from the Academy Of Motion Pictures Arts and Sciences which eliminated Puerto Rico's participation in the race for the Academy Award for Best Film in a Foreign Language. Nevertheless, it did yield two theatrical releases: Que Joyitas, directed by Eduardo 'Transfor' Ortiz, which ultimately grossed over $700,000 at the box office, and Mi verano con Amanda 2, written and directed by Benjamin 'Benji' López. Other releases included The Caller and The Witness (El Testigo).

In 2012, the short film Mi santa mirada, directed by Alvaro Aponte Centeno, became the first Puerto Rican short film to compete for the Short Film Palme d'Or at the Cannes Film Festival. Locally, 2012 marked the two-week theatrical release of the film Los Condenados and the seven-month theatrical release of Broche de oro, directed by Raul Marchand.

== Avant-garde cinema ==
During the 1960s, the medium of television counted with Telefilmo Orpa Televisión, which filmed more than a dozen 16mm productions including Los héroes del polvorín, Mañana, Los perros de Barnard and Tres en una fantasía, which were also exported to New York. A niche public also emerged for experimental films, which began following Efrain López Neris' Cine Experimental Puertorriqueño and the debut of El corral (1963). Another experimentalist, José Rodríguez Soltero produced El pecado original (1964) and Jeroví (1965) the following years. Ramón Barco's Angela (1967) followed with an appearance at the 1968 Karlovy Vary Film Festival. Experimental cinema attracted mainstream figure Jacobo Morales, who in 1970 collaborated with Víctor Cuchí in Cinco cuentos en blanco y negro, which was later sponsored by the Instituto de Cultura Puertorriqueña. Another, José Orraca, led the Taller Bohite and indulged in the genre with several of his colleagues.

== Impact outside the island ==
=== Puerto Rican actors abroad ===
Tenor Antonio Paoli was the first performer to be filmed performing an entire opera when his rendition of Pagliacci at Milan was recorded in 1907. During the silent film era, Puerto Ricans and Latin American actors gained success, with Fernando Cortés, Armando Calvo, Blanca de Castejón and Alberto Morin performing at Europe and South America. In 1899, a trio of unidentified women purported to be Puerto Rican were filmed in a risqué (for the era) mutoscope film titled How the Porto Rican Girls Entertain Uncle Sam's Soldiers performing what is said to be a "traditional dance". Alberto Morin was the first actor to become established abroad, appearing in Hollywood films since the 1928. The first actress to do so was Blanca de Castejón. Other contemporaries include Evelyn del Río, Sammy Davis Jr. and Juano Hernández. In Europe, Armando Calvo and Fernando Cortés starred in the silent cinema. With the onset of sound films Latin American performers were usually castes as stereotypical characters such as dancers or other colorful entertainers. Some Puerto Rican actors (such as Castejón) left Hollywood to continue their careers in Latin America and Europe, gathering local success and retaining presence in North America through dubbed films.

In 1938, a co-production between local and Mexican interests lead to Mis Dos Amores, featuring Blanca de Castejón and Evelyn Del Río among others. As part of an agreement with 20th Century Fox, Rafael Ramos Cobián also produced Los Hijos Mandan directed by Gabriel Soria and featuring Fernando and Julián Soler, Castejón and Arturo de Córdova. That year, Mapy Cortés and composer Rafael Hernández were involved in Teoduro Llamas' Ahora Seremos Felices filmed at Habana. During World War II, Evelyn Del Río, Josefina del Mar, Sammy Davis Jr. and Diosa Costello collaborated with the United Service Organization. The HUAC era directly affected Latin Americans including José Ferrer and Dolores Del Río (who was not allowed to film in Hollywood for aiding those previously affected by the initiative). Juano Hernández headlined one of the few productions that defied the HUAC, 1949's Intruder in the Dust. During the 1940s, Olga San Juan lead a group also composed by Diosa Costello, Mapy Cortés and Chinita Marín.

=== Puerto Rican cinema produced abroad ===
Sociopolitical topics dominated the productions of local directors abroad. The political status of Puerto Rico and the conditions faced by those that migrated to the United States were a recurrent topic. A longing within the diaspora is also a common topic. After studying abroad, José Rodríguez Soltero produced the mediometraje (???) La Lupe (1966) based on the life of Lupe Vélez, Diálogo con el Che/Dialogue with Che (1968) based on Che Guevara, The People's Church (1969), Boletín número 1 (1970) based on the Young Lords and Despierta Boricua (1971). During the 1970s, José García produced La patria es valor y sacrificio (1973), WNET's Down These Mean Street a.k.a. El mundo de Piri Thomas (1973), a documentary on the Manifest Destiny policy which featured Raúl Juliá as narrator titled Destino Manifesto (1974), Julia de Burgos (1974) and the feature film Festival (1978). This director also produced episodes GI José I (1974) and La lucha (1973) for a series named Realidades that aired in New York, but facing political backlash he returned to Puerto Rico and adapted René Marquéz's La carreta. His interest of connecting the Nuyorican and local industries was channeled through Sandino Filmes.

Others like producer Tony Felton and directors Eric Santamaría, Tony Betancourt and Douglas Sandoval collaborated with the Latin Division of Columbia Pictures in films like Hijos del vicio (1974) and El Barrio (1975), employing their previous knowledge of filmmaking in Puerto Rico. For 1975's Yeyo the distribution was instead produced by Chango Internacional Films. After a hiatus, Rodríguez Soltero returned in 1978 with Letter from Roberta Borges. Entering the 1980s, some of these films began being showed in Puerto Rico, including Diego Echevarría's Los Sures (1983) and El legado (1984), Vicente Juarbe's Puerto Rico: Our Right to Decide (1980), La casa de Ramón Iglesias (1986) by Luis Soto, Pabón Figueroa's Cristina Pagán and Heart of Loizaida by Merci Raven and Bienvenida Matías. Based in Philadelphia Francés Negrón produced AIDS in El Barrio or Esto no me pasa a mi (1986). The conflict over the presence of the United States Navy in the island municipality of Vieques was depicted by Zydnia Nazario in 1986's La batalla de Vieques. The decade closed with Plena, canto y trabajo (1989) by Pedro Rivera and Susan Zeig.

== Associated industries ==
=== Movie theaters ===
Local theater brands were present since the early 20th Century, but the cost and a slow start to the medium's popularity (during the first decade, the wealthier classes disregarded cinema as classless) allowed foreign productions to gain an retain control of the theaters in the region. The industry retained niche until the introduction of sound, and the introduction of local films with regularity during the 1950s, there were over 195 locales during the local industry's prime. However, the cost and influx of foreign theatre brands combined with a drop in attendance during the early 1980s, which displaced local brands and led to over 50 locales closing, a situation that remains to this day. The emergence of video clubs, and mall theaters during the 1990s lead to a brief increase in locales, which once again surpassed 100, despite only about 6 among the local ones favored Puerto Rican productions. Following the arrival of the 21st Century, the decline of the video rental industry and the introduction of internet streaming services, have debilitated the theatres and allowed foreign-owned brand Caribbean Cinemas to consolidate on top

=== Film magazines ===
In 1962, the short-lived Cine y Cultura magazine was published. The Roman Catholic Archdiocese of San Juan de Puerto Rico served as publisher for another magazine, Cine al Día, which was published between 1970 and 1972. In 1983, independent producers organized the Asociación Puertorriqueña de Cineastas y Videoartistas, which was politically active in efforts to push legislation that favored the local productions. They published a single issue of their magazine, Medios Modernos, in February 1984. The Ateneo Puertorriqueño published the short lived El Cineasta magazine during the 1990s.

=== Dubbing studios ===
In 1971, Empresas El Mundo organized Creative Film Producers and acquired Viguié-Guastella, focusing on translation and localization efforts. In 1974, the brothers purchased these facilities and renamed to Guastella Films. Another translating company, Quality Dubbing, emerged and lasted until 1980. The studios built during the 1970s faded, eventually closing by the early 1990s.

=== Film festivals ===
In 1982, Taller de Cine La Red organized the Encuentro Internacional de Cine Super-8. In 1984, Ivonne María Soto organized the Festival de Cine Puertorriqueño, which was followed by a similar effort by Ricardo Alegría, leading to Festival CineSanJuan. In 1990, Juan Gerard introduced the Cinemafest in response to Cinesanjuan, with both eventual merging to form the San Juan Cinemafest. However, Gerard opted to create another entity to compete, the short lived Puerto Rico International Film Festival.

== Economic initiatives ==
=== Proposals to build studios ===
After founding Puerto Rico Films in 1952 without much support, Juano Hernández would make another attempt to expand the industry during the final stages of his life, assigning terrains in Trujillo Alto to the future construction of studios. However, with his death a project about Sixto Escobar was left inconclusive.

This was the first of several failed initiatives, with Puerto Rico still remaining without the adequate facilities despite hosting an increasing number of productions. In the 2010s the mayor of San Juan Jorge Santini publicly discussed the construction of a municipal studio priced at 57 millions dollars, while the artist couple of Jennifer López and Marc Anthony considered Bayamón, Toa Baja and Dorado for their personal studios before their divorce. In 2016, the chair of the Puerto Rico Department of Economic Development and Commerce (DDEC), Alberto Bacó, announced that investors were interested in building such a project in Santurce, Guaynabo or Dorado, but no further announcements were made. In 2019, Ricardo Rosselló gave British investor Keith St. Clair the rights to build the Puerto Rico Film District as part of the Puerto Rico Convention Center district, but this project ended in a breach of contract and the government cancelling the agreement.

=== Private investment ===
Beginning in 1993, one year following its approval, the autonomous agency known as Corporación de Cine (lit. "Public Corporation for Cinema") began offering support for local producers to produce films of various lengths and formats, but this initiative only covered a fraction of the local industry and was dependent on a depuration process deeming the productions worthy. Anna Navarro made attempts to bring inversion to the local industry, but did not gather much attention.

=== Tax incentives ===
In 1985, senator Velda González (herself an actress) introduced three proposals to promote and support the local cinema industry. Legislation allowed societies formed to invest in film projects to receive tax exemptions, but the actual application proved ineffective. Law No. 362 of 1999 and No. 121 of 2001 provided a tax credit of 40% for films produced locally. The Lucy Boscana Fund (WIPR) is used to assists local productions. Changes in political administration have also affected the continuity of initiatives, de-prioritizing, transforming or cancelling them. This combined with direct competition of foreign markets have affected the local industry, leaving it with weak support from the public.

== See also ==
- Cinema of the world
- List of Puerto Rican Academy Award winners and nominees
- List of Puerto Rican films
- List of films set in Puerto Rico
- List of Caribbean films
