= Alicia Moreda =

Puerto Rican actress and comedian

- Alicia Moreda
- Born: Alicia Moreda Tuya; November 1, 1912; Mayagüez, Puerto Rico
- Died: June 13, 1983 (aged 70); Mayagüez, Puerto Rico
- Occupations: Actress and comedian.

Alicia Moreda Tuya (November 1, 1912 – June 13, 1983), was a soap opera actress, comedian, and a pioneer in Puerto Rico's television industry.

== Early years ==
Moreda was born in Mayagüez, Puerto Rico, one of three children born to Alberto Moreda Cifuentes and Celestina Tuya Lafuente. Her siblings were her sister, Adela Moreda Tuya, and her brother, Alberto Moreda Tuya. Her father was born in Gijón, Asturias, northern Spain, and had come with his brother José María to Mayagüez, Puerto Rico before the Spanish–American War. In 1921, her mother died and she was raised by her father and sisters. Moreda received her primary and secondary education at the Catholic school "Colegio La Milagrosa" in Mayagüez. At first she thought that she would like to become a nun; however, after participating in a school play, she decided that she would prefer to become an actress.

== Acting career ==
After she graduated from high school, Moreda auditioned for theatre roles and participated in many local productions. At first she would tell everyone that she was a Gallega (a person from Galicia, located in the north-western corner of Spain) and she was nicknamed "La Gallega". Besides theatre, she also made many presentations on radio. On March 28, 1954, Moreda participated in the first televised program in Puerto Rico, a comedy titled "El Caso de la Mujer Asesinadita" (The Case of the Assassinated Woman) alongside Mapy Cortés and Fernando Cortés which was transmitted by WKAQ-TV Telemundo Channel 2.

In 1960, she acted in "Casos y cosas de casa" (Cases and things of the house) with Braulio Castillo and Lillian Hurst. She also acted in the soap opera "La Gata" (The (female) Cat) and became very attached to the cat on the set. She then adopted many cats and dogs, and she named each one of the animals after a famous person.

Among the movies in which Moreda acted are the following: Romance en Puerto Rico (Romance in Puerto Rico) (1962), with José Miguel Agrelot, Bobby Capó and Luis Vigoreaux; Jucio contra un Angel (Judgement against an Angel) (1964), alongside Braulio Castillo and Luis Vigoreaux and Díos los Cría (God creates them) (1979) alongside Norma Candal, Gladys Rodríguez, Otilio Warrington, Esther Sandoval and director Jacobo Morales.

== Later years ==
She would always carry the flags of Spain and Puerto Rico wherever she went. At times when she would be hospitalized for any reason, she would request that if she ever died she would like to be buried with both flags.

Alicia Moreda died on June 13, 1985, of natural causes and was buried with her two flags in the Cementerio Municipal de Mayagüez. The city of Caguas named a street Calle Alicia Moreda in her honor.

== Selected filmography ==
- Romance in Puerto Rico (1962)
- ...And God Created Them (1979)

== See also ==
- List of Puerto Ricans
