= Teófilo Torres =

Puerto Rican film director (born 1954)

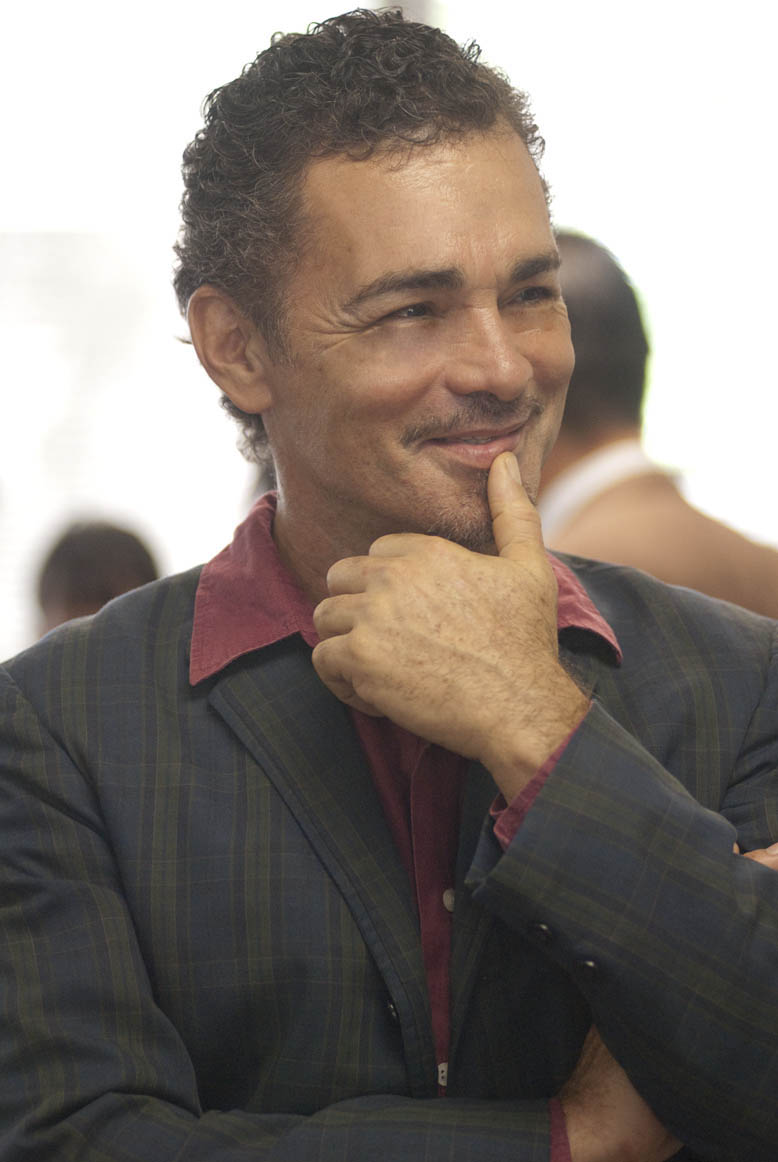
- Born: Teófilo Torres; 6 March 1954 (age 72); Ponce, Puerto Rico
- Known for: Actor

Teófilo Torres (born 6 March 1954 in Ponce, Puerto Rico) is a Puerto Rican actor, director and professor of theatre. He has acted for both television as well the big screen, and has performed in Puerto Rico and internationally.

== Early years ==
Teófilo Torres was born in Ponce, Puerto Rico, on 6 March 1954. He started into his acting career while he was still in high school in the town of Jayuya, Puerto Rico.

== Early career ==
In the early 1980s he participated in "A mis amigos de la locura", and "Papo Impala esta quita'o". In the mid-1980s, Torres partook in the Puerto Rican telenovela "Tiempo de vivir" starring Fernando Allende and Ivonne Goderich. In the late 1980s he had a role in the movie Glitz, produced by NBC and starring Jimmy Smits, and filmed in Puerto Rico. In this movie Torres played the role of a member of the police force fighting crime. Torres also particIpated in the telenovelas "Ave de paso", where he played the role of "Cheíto", a frustrated artist suffering from alcoholism, and in "Yara Prohibida" broadcast via Puerto Rico's Channel 11. Also during this time, Torres opened his own school of dramatic arts teaching courses in acting, dance and speech. Subsequently, Torres played roles in various other works such as "Contradanza", as Queen Isabel, and boasted 17 monólogs, including "El caso Dios", "La apología de Sócrates", "Papo Impala está quitao" and "A mis amigos de la locura". In 1993, Torres delved into the big screen in "La Guagua Aérea", directed by Luis Milona with a fairly good reception, both in Puerto Rico and internationally. He also worked on the monólogs "Pedro, el rojo", "Pepé Loló", "Maco" and later "El Maestro", where he plays the role of Don Pedro Albizu Campos, one of the most prominent Puerto Rican politicians of all times, and a leader in the Puerto Rican independence movement.

== Education ==
In 1994 Torres moved to New York City where he earned a MFA at Brooklyn College.

== Teaching, drama, and acting ==
In 1999, Torres returned to Puerto Rico where he worked on the telenovela "Cuando despierta el amor", presented via Puerto Rico's public television WIPR-TV. Later he appeared in the Puerto Rican Telemundo TV series titled "Después del adiós" where he played "Arturo Bolívar", a man ill with the Lou Gehrig's disease, and participated in the movie "Los Díaz de Doris" directed by Abdiel Colberg. In the same year he participated in the movie for television "Punto final", by Edwin Reyes. In that production, transmitted by Univision Puerto Rico Channel 11, Torres played the role of "Juaco", a nuyorican poet seeking to recover his identity. Torres also returns to teaching at the Drama Department of the University of Puerto Rico, in Río Piedras. In the early 2000s he plays the role of Antonio, a homosexual priest, in the movie 12 Horas by director Raúl Marchand. Torres's acting in 12 Horas was highly spoken of by the critics, marking one of his most prominent roles in the big screen. Since then, Torres has played the lead acting roles in the two most recent films by Jacobo Morales: "Dios los cría ll" and "Ángel", as well as in "Ruido", by director César Rodríguez and winner of the "Innovacion" award at the 2006 International Cinema Festival in Montreal, "Chiringa", "Desamores", "El sueño del regreso", and "Che" starring Benicio del Toro and directed by Steven Soderbergh and the 2010 "María", directed by Fernando Allende. He also developed the theatrical shows "Monogamia", "Bent", "Jav y Joss" (co-starring Francisco Capó) "Un enemigo del Pueblo", and "El caso Dios", among others.

== Filmography ==
Film
Year	Film	Role	Director
1988	Glitz	Puerto Rican Cop	Sandor Stern
1992	La guagua aérea	El ciego Mateo	Luis Molina Casanovas
1993	La recién nacida sangre	Pepe Dolores	
1997	Cuentos para despertar	Alcides	Luis Molina Casanovas
1999	Leyendas puertorriqueñas	Domingo	Luis Molina Casanovas
1999	Los Díaz de Doris	Deambulante / El Ángel	Abdiel Colberg
2001	12 Horas	Antonio	Raúl Marchand Sánchez
2002	Julia, toda de mí	Jiménez Grullón	Ivonne Belén
2004	Desamores	Jacobo Castrillo	Edmundo H. Rodríguez
2004	Devolviéndome	Hombre	César Rodríguez
2004	Dios los cría 2	Félix	Jacobo Morales
2004	Chiringa	Pedro Albizu Campos	Eladio Feliciano-Matos
2005	El sueño del regreso	Baldo	Luis Molina Casanovas
2006	Ruido	Deambulante	César Rodríguez
2006	Ángel	Asencio	Jacobo Morales
2008	Che	Coronel Hernández	Steven Soderbergh
2009	La Mancha	Sacarías	Cristian Carretero
2010	María	Sr. Armando	Fernando Allende

Television
Year	Title	Role
1975	Doce pares de negras	Goyo
1977	La caja de caudales FM	Fernando
1978	La jaula de las locas	Travesti
1986	Tiempo de vivir	Lencho
1988	Ave de paso	Chefto
1988	Glitz	Policía 1
1989	Karina Montaner	El Lama
1991	Yuyo	El Bobo
1992	La charca	Deblas
1999	Punto final	Joaco
1999	Los Diaz de Dores	Deambulante / El Ángel
2000	Coralito tiene dos maridos	Montaner
2002	La gringa	José
2002	Cuando despierta el amor	Pescador
2003	Sentimientos encontrados	Chago
2005	Desamores	Veguita
2005	Stranded	Santiago
2007	Christmas in Paradise	Benito
2008	El olor de la guayaba	Dios

== Theatre ==
Teatro
Year	Name	Role
1975	Doce pares de negras	Goyo
1977	La caja de caudales FM	Fernando
1978	La jaula de las locas	Travesti
1978	A mis amigos de la locura	Umpierre
1979	Severa vigilancia	Lefranc
1979	La plena murió en Maraguez	Danny
1980	Morbos	Rafael
1982	Había una vez y dos son tres	Harry
1982	Esperando a Godot	Pozzo
1983	Papo Impala está quitao (monólogo)	Papo
1983	La fortuna y los ojos del hombre	Rocky
1983	Walenda (monólogo)	Armando
1984	La casa de los inmortales	Ramón
1984	Colegtílogo (monólogo)	Actor
1984	El caso Dios (monólogo)	Actor
1984	Flores de papel	Merluza
1984	Un ombligo para dos	Lalo
1985	La apología de Sócrates (monólogo)	Sócrates
1985	El doctor Moncho Loro (monólogo)	Moncho Loro
1986	Contradanza	Isabel I
1987	La perra de Darwin (monólogo)	Darwin
1988	La pareja dispareja	Guillo
1988	Máscaras	Don José
1988	El arquitecto y el emperador de Asiria	El emperador
1989	Papo Impala va palante (monólogo)	Papo
1990	La noche que volvimos a ser gente (monólogo)	El hombre
1991	Seguro Social	David
1992	La bella y la bestia	La bestia
1995	Pedro Dolores (monólogo)	Pedro Dolores
1995	Maco (monólogo)	Maco
1995	Pedro el rojo (monólogo)	Pedro
1997	Sneakin’outa revolving door (monólogo)	Chico
1998	El duende oculto(monólogo)	Umpierre
2001	Bent	Horst
2004	Monogamia	Juan
2005	El Maestro (monólogo)	Albizu Campos
2006	Jav y Jos	Jav
2006	Un enemigo del Pueblo	Pedro Stockman

== Director and producer ==
- 2008 Todo es según el color
- 2007 Oh María
- 2005 El huésped vacio
- 2004 Voces
- 2004 Vegigantes
- 2003 La mirada del hombre oscuro
- 1998 El duende oculto
- 1997 Snekin’outa revolvin door
- 1995 Pedro el rojo
- 1995 Maco
- 1995 Pepe Dolores
- 1990 Hombre
- 1990 El Gfbar
- 1989 Papo Impala va palante
- 1988 Terrazo
- 1988 La perra de Darwin
- 1986 EL doctor Moncho Loro
- 1985 La apología de Sócrates
- 1984 El caso Dios
- 1984 Colectilogo
- 1983 Walenda
- 1983 En defensa de Natalie
- 1983 Papo Impala esta quitao
- 1982 A mis amigos de la locura
- 1982 Había una vez y dos son tres
