= Esther Sandoval =

Puerto Rican actress (1925–2006)

- Born: Esther María González; 28 December 1925; Ponce, Puerto Rico
- Died: 6 February 2006 (aged 80); Río Piedras, Puerto Rico
- Spouse: Ivan Goderich
- Children: 2

Esther Sandoval (28 December 1925 – 6 February 2006) was a Puerto Rican actress and a pioneer in Puerto Rico's television.

== Early years ==
Sandoval was born Esther María González in Ponce where she received her primary and secondary education. After graduating from Salinas High School, she attended Colegio Percy de Ponce (Percy College of Ponce) and earned a degree in secretarial sciences.

== Radio actress ==
Sandoval went to work for El Día, a local newspaper in Ponce. She first came into contact with the field of communications when she went to work as a secretary for Emilio Huyke in the radio station WPAB. She auditioned and was named director of a program directed towards a female audience. In 1949, she informed her parents that she wanted to become an entertainer and she left for San Juan, despite their protests, and went to work for Ángel Ramos' "Radio El Mundo", which later became known as WKAQ. She was given the surname "Sandoval" by the Argentine actress Queca Guerrero. Sandoval landed roles in radionovelas (radio soap operas) and became known in Puerto Rico as "The Queen of the Radio Operas".

== Television debut ==
In 1954, Sandoval became a pioneer in the island's television when she participated, alongside Mario Pabón and Lucy Boscana, in Puerto Rico's first televised telenovela Ante La Ley which was transmitted through Telemundo. The soap opera caused a national scandal in Puerto Rico because in one scene she kissed her co-star Pabon in the mouth, an act that was totally unheard of in those days.

== Theater in New York City ==
Sandoval traveled to New York City, where she joined Míriam Colón's theatrical group "El Circulo Dramatico" (The Drama Circuit). Later she founded her own theatrical group and named it "Experimental Hall of Theater". They were located at the Lucerne Hotel of New York. There she produced and starred in Té y Simpatía (Tea and Sympathy) and Dondé esta la Luz? (Where is the Light?). Before returning to Puerto Rico, Sandoval made several presentations in the Teatro Puerto Rico.

== Return to Puerto Rico ==
In 1959, Sandoval returned to the island and married Ivan Goderich, a Cuban soap opera musical director. They had two daughters, Yara Goderich and Ivonne Goderich. Ivonne would follow her mother's footsteps and become an actress herself. Sandoval continued working in soap operas, such as Bodas de Sangre (Blood Wedding), La Novia (The Bride), La Rosa Taluada, Un Tren Travia llamada Deseo, Santa Juana de America and Los Soles Truncos, where she acted alongside her daughter Ivonne and her son-in-law Xavier Cifre. She also lent her voice in the Spanish translation of movies. She was the voiceover of Joan Crawford, Barbara Stanwyck and Rosalind Russell. In 1978, her supporting role in the Telemundo soap opera Cristina Bazán was thoroughly acknowledged, alongside José Luis Rodríguez and Johanna Rosaly. In 1979, she participated alongside Norma Candal, Alicia Moreda, Gladys Rodríguez and Otilio Warrington in Jacobo Morales' movie Dios los Cría (And God Created Them), where she played the role of a prostitute.

== Awards and recognitions ==
According to El Vocero (See reference) Sandoval received many awards and recognitions, including:

- Best Actress and Best Actress of the Year (1955)
- Golden Coqui for Best Actress (1966)
- Golden Aqueybana (1968 and 1974)
- Selected amongst the most distinguished Puerto Rican women during the celebration of the International Year of the Women
- The Golden Coral Award from the Festival of the New Latin Movie in Havana for her role in Díos los Cría
- The Legislative Assembly of Puerto Rico approved a life pension for her in 1998 in honor of her valuable contributions to the Puerto Rican theater
- The Puerto Rican Institute of Culture dedicated its 46th Festival of the Puerto Rican Film industry to her (1998)

Amongst the movies in which she participated are:

- Creature from the Haunted Sea (1961)
- Thunder Island (1963) - Rena
- Traitors of San Angel (1967) - Doña Consuelo
- Las Pasiones Infernales (1969)
- "Cristina Bazán (1978) TV series - Rosaura Alsina
- Dios los Cría (1979) - Old Prostitute
- La Otra Mujer (1980) TV series

== Later years ==
In the late 1990s, Sandoval suffered from the complications of various health problems such as Alzheimer's disease, chronic diabetes and a cerebral hemorrhage, which left part of her body paralysed. She had been hospitalized at the Antiilas Hospital of Rio Piedras for several years, before dying on February 6, 2006. Her body was cremated on February 10, in accord with her wishes.

== See also ==
- List of Puerto Ricans
- History of women in Puerto Rico
