= Miguel Ángel Suárez =

Puerto Rican actor

- Born: July 5, 1939; San Juan, Puerto Rico
- Died: April 1, 2009 (aged 69); Guaynabo, Puerto Rico
- Occupation: Actor
- Years active: 1971–2008
- Spouse: Amneris Morales

Miguel Ángel Suárez (July 5, 1939 – April 1, 2009) was a Puerto Rican soap opera and movie actor.

== Early years ==
Suárez and his sister were born into a middle-class family and raised in the Santurce section of San Juan, Puerto Rico. His father worked at a local supermarket and his mother was a housewife. When Suárez was a child, he went with his mother to see a play. This was his first experience with the theater and Suárez was so impressed that after the curtains rose and the actors did their show, he knew that he wanted to become an actor. Suárez went to school and received his primary and secondary education in his hometown. When Suárez and his sister returned from school, their mother would read stories or prepare little plays which helped to develop their imagination.

The supermarket where the elder Suárez worked was located next to the radio station Radio El Mundo. Manuel Méndez Ballester, a well-known playwright, who worked as a writer for the radio station, frequently visited the supermarket and Suárez's father soon became friends with Ballester. In 1947, Ballester told the elder Suárez that he was in need of an 8-year-old for the protagonist role in a play that he wrote because the person he had in mind didn't pass the audition. When the elder Suárez realized that the "part" paid more than what he was making working in the supermarket, he took his son to the auditions and this was the beginning of Suárez's acting career. In 1956, when Suárez was 17 years old, he enlisted in the United States Navy and was assigned to the submarine division.

== Television ==
When Suárez was discharged from the Navy, he returned to Puerto Rico, where he began doing theater work and later starred as Rev. Sullivan in Las Almas No Tienen Color (1969), the first soap opera produced by Tommy Muniz for WAPA-TV. In 1972, he was cast in El Hijo De Angela María, which was so successful that was soon made into a movie. Afterward the artistic class in the island went through a crisis, and because he was unable to get an acting job, Suarez went to Argentina, where he was given a role in the soap opera Amor Gitano (Gypsy Love). He later went to Venezuela, where he participated in the soap operas Corazon de Diamante (Heart of Diamonds) and Laura Benson. In Puerto Rico, he participated in many locally produced soap operas, such as Vivir Para Ti (I Live for You). In 1994, he was cast in Señora Tentacion (Mrs. Temptation) with Mexican movie star Lucía Méndez. This soap opera was a hit in the Caribbean, Central and South America, and Europe.

== Film ==
In 1971, Suárez was cast in the locally produced Woody Allen movie Bananas with Jacobo Morales. In 1980, he played an inmate in the TV movie Escape, partially filmed in Puerto Rico, with Timothy Bottoms and Colleen Dewhurst. He then went to Hollywood, and in 1980, landed a role in the movie Stir Crazy, directed by Sidney Poitier starring Richard Pryor and Gene Wilder. He was sometimes credited under the names Miguelángel Suárez and Miguel Suárez.

Other movies in which Suárez participated include La Gran Fiesta (1985); Isabel la Negra (1978) with Míriam Colón and Raúl Juliá; Havana (1990) produced by Sidney Pollack and Under Suspicion (2000) with Gene Hackman, Morgan Freeman, and Nydia Caro. In 2007, Suárez performed one of the main roles in Jacobo Morales' movie Ángel.

== Death ==
Suárez died on April 1, 2009, losing his battle with esophageal cancer; he was 69 years old. He is survived by his widow, the actress Amneris Morales, his daughter Alondra Suárez and his stepdaughter Belange Rodríguez. Suárez's remains were cremated on April 5 in accordance to his wishes. On 4 April 2010, his cremated remains where interred in a family plot located in Santa Maria Magdalena de Pazzis Cemetery in Old San Juan.

== Filmography ==
Among the films in which he participated are:

- Che: Part One (2008)
- Abuelo, El (2008/II)
- Angel (2007)
- Illegal Tender (2007)
- Cuerpo del delito, El (2005) (TV)
- Revolución en el infierno (2004) (TV)
- Dios los cría 2 (2004)
- Más allá del límite (2002)
- Cuento inolvidable de la abuela, El (2002) TV
- Padre Astro (2001) (TV)
- Tosca, la verdadera historia (2001)
- Under Suspicion (2000)
- Cundeamor (2000) (TV)
- Jara (2000)
- Punto final: De como Tito Mangual aprendio a bregar (1999) (TV)
- Paradise Lost (1999/I)
- The Survivor (1998)
- Señora Tentacion (1995) (TV)
- Al son del amor" (1995) (TV)
- Los Ladrones van a la oficina (1 episode, 1993)
- El Rescate del talismán (1991) (TV)
- Havana (1990/I)
- Ni se te ocurra (1990)
- "Misión cumplida" (1990) (TV)
- Isabel la Negra (1990)
- Gran fiesta, La (1985)
- Prohibido amar en Nueva York (1984)
- Entre el amor y el poder (1984) (TV)
- Amor gitano (1983) (TV)
- Vivir para tí (1982) (TV)
- Yo Se que Mentia (1982) (TV)
- Stir Crazy (1980)
- Escape (1980) (TV)
- Dios los cría (1979)
- El Hijo de Angela Maria (1974)
- Bananas (1971)

=== Telenovelas (soap operas) ===
- Amor Gitano (in Argentina).
- Corazón De Diamante and Laura Benson (in Venezuela).
- Las Almas No Tienen Color, El Hijo de Angela María, Yo Se que Mentia, Vivir Para Ti and Señora Tentación (in Puerto Rico)

== See also ==
- List of Puerto Ricans
