= Johanna Rosaly =

Puerto Rican actress

- Born: Raquel Johanna Rosaly Guillermety; January 13, 1948 (age 78); Santurce, Puerto Rico
- Education: Academia del Perpetuo Socorro (1965)
- Alma mater: BA University of Puerto Rico; MA Center for Advanced Studies on Puerto Rico and the Caribbean
- Occupations: Actress; singer; television host
- Notable work: Lo que le Pasó a Santiago
- Children: 3

Raquel Johanna Rosaly Guillermety (Note: In this Spanish name, the first or paternal surname is Rosaly and the second or maternal family name is Guillermety.) (born January 13, 1948) is a Puerto Rican actress, singer, and television host.

== Early years ==
Johanna Rosaly was born in Santurce, a district of San Juan. In 1956 at the age of eight, she started taking acting lessons with Argentinians Luis A. Negro and Elba Mania, and dancing lessons with Beatriz Trujillo. In 1957, she made her acting debut as a child, on stage, at Teatro Tapia, in Old San Juan, in Mientras los Niños Juegan (While the Children Play). That same year, she made her debut on television, with Channel 2's children's production of Los Amigos de Pinocho (Pinocho's Friends) as well as in the film Con Los Pies Descalzos (an Osvaldo Agüero production, starring the Catalan actor Ricardo Palmerola).

== Teenage years ==
Rosaly started taking singing lessons when she became a teenager. Then, she participated on stage in Spanish zarzuelas such as “El Caserío”, and “Black el Payaso”; operettas, such as “La duquesa del Bal Tabarin”, and musicals performed in English, such as “My Fair Lady”, “The Sound of Music” and “I Do, I Do”.

In 1966, already in her early years in college, she made her TV debut in the telenovela El Retrato de Angela, broadcast by Telemundo. In this soap opera, she played a mute girl.

== Singing career ==
During the late 1970s and early 80s, Johanna Rosaly had a short but notable career as a singer. In 1978 she signed with the Venezuelan Velvet Records label, and began touring all over Latin America, to promote her two albums under that label and following the popularity of the soap operas she had starred in. In 1980 she would sign with CBS International label, now Sony Discos, and recorded two more albums for them, doing shows in many US cities with high Hispanic populations.

== Television acting career ==
Rosaly performed in 15 soap operas altogether from 1966 - 1980. However, the leading roles she is mostly remembered for were, 1973's El Hijo de Angela María, alongside Rolando Barral, Mona Marti, Ángela Meyer, and Lucy Boscana, among others. This performance led her to carry out the same leading role, Marisela Perdomo, in the film based on the telenovela, in Mexico, opposite Iranian-Mexican actress Irán Eory. Her crossover as a singer/actress was in 1978's Cristina Bazán, opposite José Luis Rodríguez "El Puma", and alongside Alba Nydia Díaz, Esther Sandoval, and Adamari López, at the early age of 6, among others.

In 1979 Johanna Rosaly left Telemundo (WKAQ-TV)for WAPA-TV, where she performed as the main star in the 1980 soap operas: “Vida”,Amame, opposite Dominican-Mexican Andrés García, and “El Amor Nuestro de Cada Día”, opposite Venezuelan Jean Carlo Simancas. For each one she sang the musical theme, namely “Yo Soy Un Barco” (composed by Lou Briel), “Amándote” and “El Amor Nuestro de Cada Día”, respectively.

== Anchor woman & TV host ==
As the 1980s came about, Rosaly made a short parenthesis in her acting career, working as an executive in WAPA-TV, and shortly moved to Telemundo again, becoming first a Cultural and Arts News reporter for Telenoticias, and eventually in 1982 an anchor woman and host in the talk-show, En Vivo a las Cinco. She also starred in the five-hours-long game show Super Sábados, which for several years was aired via satellite to many Hispanic enclaves in the US. In 1993, Johanna Rosaly joined WIPR-TV channel 6, Puerto Rico's Government TV channel, hosting several shows, such as Mucho Gusto, “Cultura Viva” and “¿Y Cómo Fue”.

== Films ==
In 1989, she performed alongside Tommy Muñiz in the motion picture film Lo que le Pasó a Santiago, produced and directed by Jacobo Morales, which was nominated for an Oscar as the best foreign film. In 1993 she performed in, Shortcut to Paradise, and in 1994's Linda Sara, alongside Chayanne and Dayanara Torres. Other film credits include “Dios Los Cría II”, “El Bailao de Julia y Berto”, “Con los Pies Descalzos”, “Jugando en Serio” and “Force of Nature”.

== Recent years ==
Since the 1990s, she has devoted herself mostly to the stage, to critical acclaim for works such as Master Class, “Punto y Coma” (W;t), “Buenas Noches, Mamá (“‘Good Night, Mother”), “Relaciones Peligrosas” (Dangerous Liaisons), among many others. Altogether, she has performed in over 100 plays during her very long acting career .

In 2010, she made her debut on the New York stage, in Sabina y Lucrecia. Rosaly and New York-based actress Eva Cristina Vásquez starred in this play by Alberto Adellach, " a tale of two very different mentally ill women who escape an asylum."

Rosaly played "Mrs. Warren" in the San Juan revival of La profesión de la Sra. Warren, as part of the International Festival of the Puerto Rican Culture Institute.

== Personal life ==
On January 11, 2008, Rosaly married José Manuel Saldaña, the former president of the University of Puerto Rico. The couple announced their separation in June 2011.

During the 2018 California wildfires, Rosaly was at the residence of her son, film director José Gilberto Molinari, and her daughter-in-law as well as her two-month old grandchild in Agoura Hills. She escaped the Woolsey Fire with her family by taking refuge in a hotel. Molinari's house only suffered minor damages. A day later, close to the hotel the Rocky Fire started, however, it was soon controlled and the family did not have to flee for a second time.

=== Honors ===
She has received multiple honors, among them, the Puerto Rican Culture Institute (ICP), dedicated their 1997 International Theater Festival to her, honoring her more than 40 years as an actress.

== Filmography ==
=== Film ===
Year	Title	Role	Notes
1974	El hijo de Angela Maria	Marisela Perdommo	
1989	Lo que le pasó a Santiago	Nereida	1990 Best Foreign Language Film nominee
1994	Linda Sara	Sofía	
1995	Qué será		Short film
1998	Enredando sombras	Maria Candelaria	Documentary
2004	Dios los cría 2	Alma	"Lo mismo de otra manera" segment
2012	Under Rain	Elvira Aragón	Short film
2012	Medio Minuto	Rafaela	Short film
2016	Angélica	Angeles	
2020	El quinceañero de mi abuela		Post-production

=== Television ===
Year	Title	Role	Notes
1961	La divina infiel		
1972	Tomiko	Lady Diana Cavendish	
1978	Cristina Bazán	Cristina Bazán	Three part-miniseries
1979	Vida	Vera and Vida	Three part mini-series
1980	La otra mujer	Adriana	
1980	El amor nuestro de cada día		Also singer of theme song
1986-1990	Súper Sábados	Self	
1998	Asesinato en primer grado	Selva	TV-movie
2001-2011	Cultura Viva	Self	Co-host
2004	Barrios	Julia	Ep. 2 "El Bailao de Julia y Berto"
2012-2014	Los cascos urbanos hablan	Self	Host

== See also ==
- List of Puerto Ricans
- List of people from San Juan, Puerto Rico
- Cristina Bazán
- Andrés García
- "El Puma"
