= Ángel (film) =

- Promotional poster for Ángel
- Directed by: Jacobo Morales
- Written by: Jacobo Morales
- Starring: Braulio Castillo, hijo Jacobo Morales; Yamaris Latorre; José Félix Gómez; Miguelángel Suárez
- Music by: Pedro Rivera Toledo
- Production company: Cinesí
- Release date: August 16, 2007
- Running time: 147 minutes
- Country: Puerto Rico
- Language: Spanish

Ángel is a 2007 Puerto Rican film written and directed by Jacobo Morales. Morales also performs one of the lead roles in the film. The film was released on August 16, 2007, in Puerto Rico. It was produced by Cinesí Productions.

== Plot ==
The film follows the actions of a corrupt police captain, the title-character Ángel Lugo, performed by Braulio Castillo, hijo. Lugo is responsible for the wrongful imprisonment of Mariano Farías (Morales) and the murder of his pregnant wife (Sara Jarque).

After 15 years in a federal prison, Farías is still determined to prove his innocence. For that, he recruits the help of Juan Miranda, the district attorney that originally prosecuted him, who is now a retired alcoholic.

Meanwhile, Lugo is still trying to keep his involvement in Farías' case and other wrongdoings under wraps. To accomplish it, he bribes his accomplice Villanueva (José Félix Gómez) into helping him. Villanueva is now having second thoughts about his involvement and only wants to protect his wife and grandson.

Involved in everything is a female reporter, Julia Norat (Yamaris Latorre), who receives exclusive information from Lugo and has also become his lover. However, upon meeting Farías, Norat is quickly charmed by him.

== Cast ==
- Braulio Castillo, hijo - Captain Ángel Lugo
- Jacobo Morales - Mariano Farías
- Yamaris Latorre - Julia Norat
- José Félix Gómez - Sergeant José "Cheo" Villanueva
- Miguel Ángel Suárez - Juan S. Miranda

== Awards ==
The film was considered, among four other films, to be submitted for the 80th Academy Awards. For the selection, a voting was held on September 24, 2007, among members of the Puerto Rico Film Corporation. In the final voting, Angel ended up tied with Maldeamores for the first place. In a second-round voting, the latter prevailed when a voter abstained (see Submissions for the 80th Academy Award for Best Foreign Language Film).

== See also ==
- Cinema of Puerto Rico
- List of films set in Puerto Rico
