= Linda Sara =

1994 film by Jacobo Morales

- Directed by: Jacobo Morales
- Written by: Jacobo Morales
- Produced by: Blanca Silvia Eró
- Starring: Dayanara Torres; Chayanne; Daniel Lugo; Johanna Rosaly; Adamari López
- Cinematography: Milton Graña
- Edited by: Alfonso Borrell
- Music by: Pedro Rivera Toledo
- Production companies: Cinesí, Inc.
- Release date: 1994
- Running time: 107 minutes
- Country: Puerto Rico
- Language: Spanish

Linda Sara is a 1994 Puerto Rican film written and directed by Jacobo Morales and starring former Miss Universe Dayanara Torres and singer Chayanne. The film was selected as the Puerto Rican entry for the Best Foreign Language Film at the 67th Academy Awards, but was not accepted as a nominee.

== Cast ==
- Dayanara Torres - Young Sara
- Chayanne - Young Alejandro
- Daniel Lugo - Gustavo
- Johanna Rosaly - Sofía
- Jacobo Morales - Pablo
- Jorge Luis Ramos - Mario
- Joan Amick - Doña Sara
- Adamari López - Tita
- Benjamín Morales - Don Alejandro
- Jorge Javier Melani - Tavito

== See also ==
- Cinema of Puerto Rico
- List of Puerto Ricans in the Academy Awards
- List of submissions to the 67th Academy Awards for Best Foreign Language Film
- List of Puerto Rican submissions for the Academy Award for Best Foreign Language Film
