= Cristina Bazán =

Puerto Rican television series

Cristina Bazán is the name of a 1978 and 2016 (The Very End for Cristina Bazán), Puerto Rican telenovela starring Puerto Rican actress and singer Johanna Rosaly, and the Venezuelan singer/idol José Luis Rodríguez El Puma. The soap opera, was co-produced in Puerto Rico by Radio Caracas Television of Venezuela and Telemundo Puerto Rico. The show had international success and a record numbers of viewers.

Cristina Bazán was responsible for bringing Johanna Rosaly and José Luis Rodríguez to international TV stardom in Latin America and Spain. The story of Cristina Bazán was the typical story of Cinderella, where the poor and good girl (Cristina) is mistreated by her stepmother and sisters, and finally finds the love of the "handsome" and rich guy (Rodolfo Alcantara). Other characters in this soap opera include 'Ambar Alsina' (Gilda Haddock), 'Taina' (Alba Nydia Díaz), 'Rosaura' (Esther Sandoval), 'Miguel Angel' (Luis Daniel Rivera) and 'Tere' (Alejandra Pinedo). A very young Adamari López has a special appearance. this soap opera was produced by Ramon Mangles and Angel del Cerro, with a screenplay by Inés Rodena and TV scripts by Manuel G. Piñera

== Plot summary ==
Cristina Bazán tells the story of Cristina, who studies in an intern school in San Juan, Puerto Rico with her frivolous and evil stepsister, Ambar Alsina. Cristina thinks that her mother Laura is a widow and keeps traveling taking care of her business. But Laura is not a widow business woman. The truth is that Laura is allegedly a prostitute who is in jail for false charges. When she goes to prison, she asks Cristina's father to support her. When Cristina and Ambar graduate from the internate school they go live at Cristina's father's house, Cristina's father is married to Rosaura who is the mother of Ambar. Rosaura and Ambar hate Cristina and they make her into some sort of servant. Ambar is going to marry the "handsome" Rodolfo Alcantara who does not have a clue that she is sleeping with Miguel Ángel who is a doctor in medicine. Rodolfo is beginning to interest in Cristina who loves him in silence. Rodolfo refuses to have sex with Ambar on the wedding night because she is not a virgin. Ambar is pregnant by Miguel Ángel who has fallen into alcoholism and she does not want anyone to know that she is expecting a child from him. Now is when Rosaura invents a plan: make everyone believe that Cristina is awaiting a child from the chauffeur, she has to accept and fake that she is pregnant. Cristina and Ambar go both to the country so Cristina could have "her child".
