= Pasiones infernales =

1969 film

- Directed by: Juan Orol
- Starring: Velda Gonzalez; Hector Suarez; Esther Sandoval; Jaime Ruiz Escobar; Luis Antonio Cosme
- Release date: 1969

Pasiones infernales (lit. Infernal Passions), also known as La hija del Sol (lit. The Daughter of the Sun) is a 1969 Puerto Rican-Mexican film directed by Juan Orol. It stars Velda Gonzalez, Hector Suarez, Esther Sandoval, Jaime Ruiz Escobar and Luis Antonio Cosme, among others.

It is not to be confused with Pasiones tormentosas (1946) by the same director.

Pasiones infernales is Orol's penultimate film success. The film contains elements of melodrama.

== Premise ==
The movie deals with racism in the Latino community. It concentrates on racial differences between groups of whites and Blacks-Mestizo in a Spanish-speaking island.

== Plot ==
The film follows Marcia, a beautiful young woman, in her attempts to seduce Cándido, an engaged man. It is set in Puerto Rico.
