= Paging Emma =

1999 film by Roberto Busó-García

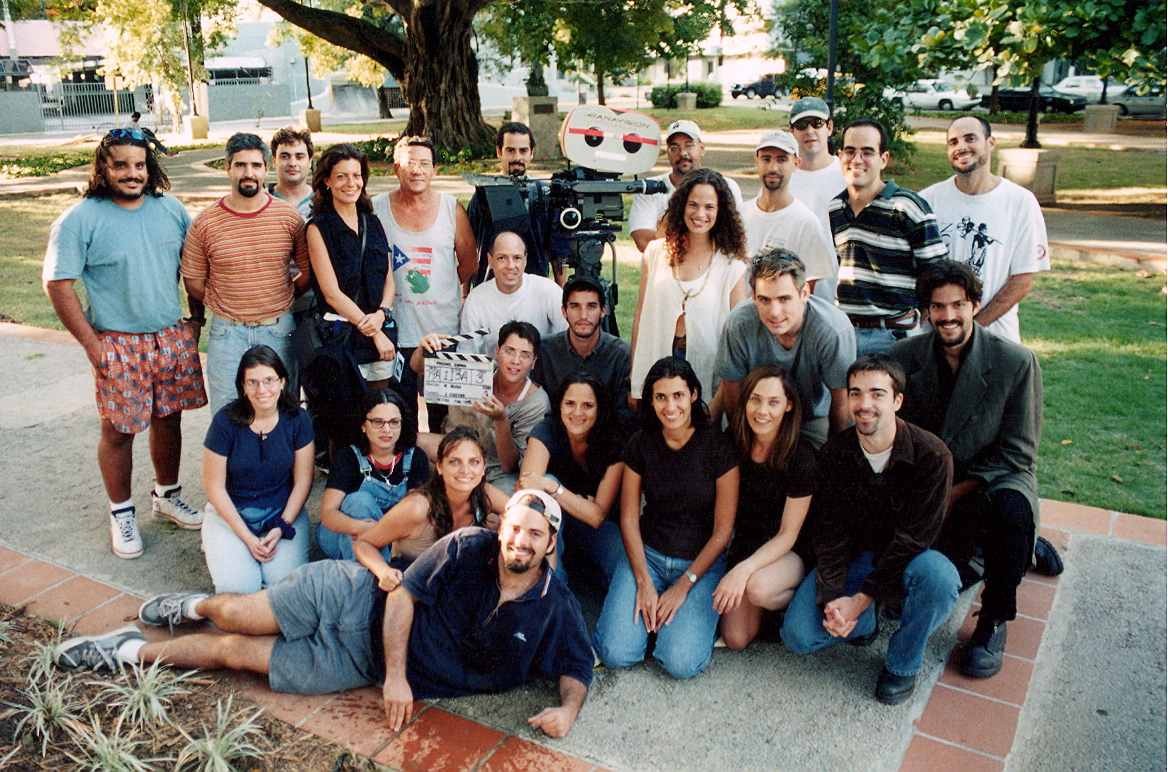
- Don't Ask Why
- Directed by: Roberto Busó-García
- Written by: Roberto Busó-García
- Produced by: Roberto Busó-García; Amy Geng; Todd Y. Park; Carlos González-Salicrup
- Starring: Lynn Evans; Mark Fish (writer); Michael Stone; Patrick Cartmel; Amanda Byron; Rocky Venegas; Tanya Soler; Pablo Cunqueiro
- Cinematography: Jaime Costas
- Music by: Thomas DeRenzo, ABAKO
- Release date: 1999
- Running time: 112 minutes
- Country: Puerto Rico
- Language: English
- Budget: $600,000.00

Paging Emma is a 1999, English-language film written and directed by Roberto Busó-García. It is set in Puerto Rico.

== Plot summary ==
The film follows Emma Donne, who is left with nothing after witnessing the shooting and abduction of her husband. Lacking family and friends, she immerses herself in the only thing she has left: her work. As an operator at a paging company, Emma is a modern-day messenger. She begins to find solace by living vicariously through the message she relays... and what once was a dreadful chore becomes an obsession for her. Methodically, Emma retreats from the world around her and starts to substitute her basic need for human contact with these meaningless and impersonal messages. After months without a clue about her husband's disappearance, Emma starts receiving personal and intimate messages that only her husband could write. With nothing to lose but her life, Emma gets involved and follows the lead of the mystifying messages. Caught in an ever-widening web of lies and strange coincidences, Emma realizes that events are not always what they seem, as dark secrets about her previous "perfect" life begin to surface.

The 35mm feature film had a theatrical premiere at the Metro Cinema in Santurce, Puerto Rico, on Monday, November 8, 1999. It did not succeed in getting a distributor, and has never been released to the general public.

== See also ==
- Cinema of Puerto Rico
- List of films set in Puerto Rico
