= Carlos Montalbán =

Mexican actor (1904–1991)

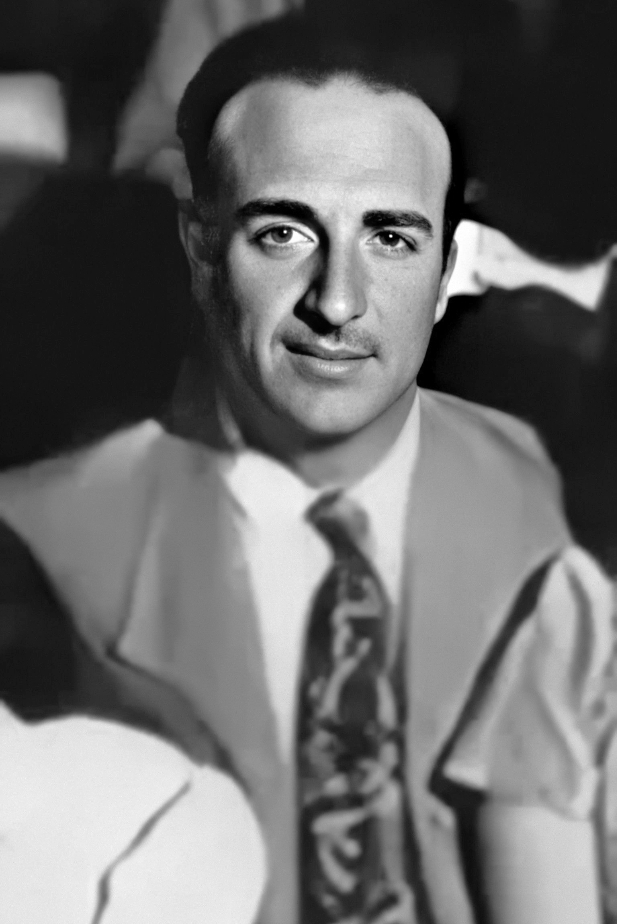
- Carlos Montalbán in 1944
- Born: Carlos Montalbán y Merino; June 5, 1904; Torreón, Coahuila, Mexico
- Died: March 28, 1991 (aged 86); Manhattan, New York City, U.S.
- Occupation: Actor
- Years active: 1932–1971
- Spouse: Mary Montalbán (m. 1930)
- Relatives: Ricardo Montalbán (brother)

Carlos Montalbán y Merino (June 5, 1904 – March 28, 1991) was a Mexican character actor.

== Early life ==
Montalbán was born in Torreón in Coahuila, Mexico, the son of Ricarda Merino Jiménez and Genaro Balbino Montalbán Busano, a store manager. His parents were Spanish.

== Career ==
Montalbán was the older brother of actor Ricardo Montalbán and is remembered for portraying two different characters named "Vargas" in well-remembered films; The Out-of-Towners (1970) starring Jack Lemmon, and Woody Allen's Bananas (1971). His best remembered role is likely in the American boxing drama The Harder They Fall (1956), where he plays the sympathetic manager of a heavyweight contender.

He appeared as "El Exigente" in a series of coffee advertisements for Savarin Coffee in the 1960s and 1970s. Montalbán was also a renowned voice-over actor and announcer, best known as the official Spanish language voice for Marlboro cigarettes worldwide. He also provided translated Spanish narration for documentaries produced by the US Information Agency in the 1960s.

== Death ==
Montalbán died on March 28, 1991, in his Manhattan home in New York City of cardiovascular disease and was survived by his wife Mary, a New Yorker, two brothers, Pedro and the actor Ricardo Montalbán, and a sister, Carmen, also from Torreon, Mexico.

== Filmography ==
Year	Title	Role	Notes
1933	Flying Down to Rio		
1934	La cruz y la espada	Esteban	
1934	Un capitan de Cosacos		Uncredited
1934	Dos más uno dos	Ronald	
1934	Sadie McKee	Pedro	
1935	Under the Pampas Moon	Dancer	Uncredited
1935	Rosa de Francia		Uncredited
1936	The Adventures of Frank Merriwell	Rurale Captain	Serial, Uncredited
1936	El Crimen De Media Noche	Johnny	
1936	A Message to Garcia	Spanish Gunner	Uncredited with Barbara Stanwyck
1936	El carnaval del diablo		Uncredited
1937	When You're in Love	Minor Role	Uncredited with Grace Moore and Cary Grant
1937	Love Under Fire	Staff Officer	Uncredited
1939	Bachelor Father	Esteban	
1939	El rancho del pinar	José	
1939	Cuando Canta La Ley		
1943	La guerra la gano yo		
1943	El espejo		
1955	Producers Showcase		Episode: "Yellow Jack" with Lorne Greene
1956	The Harder They Fall	Luís Agrandi	with Humphrey Bogart, Rod Steiger
1956	Crowded Paradise		with Mario Alcalde and Nancy Kelly
1957	The Mysterians		1959 English version co-director, with Peter Riethof
1959	Flor De Mayo	Nacho	with Jack Palance
1960	Pepe	Rodriguez	with Shirley Jones and Bing Crosby
1961	Go Naked in the World	Maitre d'	Uncredited
1965	Love Has Many Faces	Don Julian	with Lana Turner, Cliff Robertson, and Stephanie Powers
1965–1967	The FBI	Gen. Rafael Romero	2 episodes
1970	The Out-of-Towners	Cuban Diplomat	with Jack Lemmon
1971	Bananas	General Emilio M. Vargas	with Woody Allen (final film role)
TBA	The March of Time	Narrator	
