= 12 Hours =

2001 film by Raúl Marchand Sánchez

12 Horas
- Film poster
- Directed by: Raúl Marchand Sánchez
- Written by: Raúl Marchand Sánchez
- Produced by: Elba Luis Lugo; Jorge Rojas Buscaglia
- Starring: Charlie Masso; Cielomar Cuevas; Marcos Betancourt; Michelle Deliz; Wanda Rovira
- Music by: Geronimo Mercado
- Distributed by: Manhattan Pictures International
- Release date: 2001
- Running time: 89 minutes
- Language: Spanish

12 Hours (Spanish: 12 Horas) is a 2001 Puerto Rican movie. It was written and directed by Raúl Marchand Sánchez, and marked both his screenwriting and directorial debut.

The movie follows 12 hours or one night in the life of a taxi driver and other characters in Santurce, Puerto Rico.

It had a six-week run in Puerto Rican cinemas. Its profanity and sexual content were a definite deviation from the norm as far Puerto Rican films up to that time.

== Cast ==
- Patricia Alonso as Spanish Fly (drag queen)
- Jaime Bello as Gustavo
- Marcos Betancourt as Roberto
- Joe Blues as Radio voice
- Fernanda Bracho as Fernanda (drag queen)
- Cielomar Cuevas as Cristina
- Michelle Deliz as Virginia
- Rosabel del Valle as Kathy
- Juan M. García as Policeman
- Modesto Lacen as Asaltante
- Kidany Lugo as Jorge
- Flavia Manes Rossi as Jackeline Bom Bom
- Karla Marcano as Reina
- Louis Martinez as Cashier at mini-mart
- Charlie Massó as Abraham
- Yadira Nazario as Liza
- Sylvia Vargas Negrón as Roberto's wife
- Brenda Plumel as Mari
- Jorge Rangel as Charlie
- Daritcia Rivera as Paulina
- Wanda Rovira as Ada
- Anthony Stuart as Sr. beefeater
- Teófilo Torres as Antonio
- Melisa Vázquez as Letty
- Ramon Vázquez as Bouncer
- Mahya Veray as Draga #2 - "c.c. red"

== See also ==
- Cinema of Puerto Rico
- List of films set in Puerto Rico
- List of Puerto Ricans in the Academy Awards
