= Modesta =

1956 film

- Directed by: Benjamin Doniger
- Written by: Benjamin Doniger; Luis A. Maisonet; René Marqués
- Starring: Antonia Hidalgo; Juan Ortiz Jiménez
- Release date: 1956

Modesta

Modesta is a 1956 short film that stars Antonia Hidalgo and Juan Ortiz Jiménez.

== Plot ==
A feminist manifesto set in Puerto Rico, in which a peasant woman rebels against her husband's authoritarianism. She and the other women of her community organize the Liberated Women League to fight for their rights.

== Production ==
The movie was adapted by Benjamin Doniger, Luis A. Maisonet and René Marqués from a story by Domingo Silas Ortiz and produced by DIVEDCO. It was also directed by Doniger.

== Legacy ==
In 1998, Modesta was selected for preservation in the United States National Film Registry by the Library of Congress as being "culturally, historically, or aesthetically significant", one of the few Latino films to distinguished that honor. It is also in the public domain.
