= Maldeamores =

2007 film directed by Luis Guzmán

- Film poster
- Directed by: Carlos Ruíz Ruíz; Mariem Pérez Riera
- Written by: Jorge Gonzáles; Carlos Ruíz Ruíz
- Produced by: Luillo Ruíz
- Starring: Luis Guzmán; Miguel Ángel Álvarez; Chavito Marrero; Silvia Brito
- Release dates: April 27, 2007 (Tribeca); September 2007 (Puerto Rico)
- Country: Puerto Rico
- Language: Spanish

Maldeamores (English: Lovesickness) is a 2007 Puerto Rican film starring Luis Guzmán, written by Carlos Ruíz Ruíz and Jorge Gonzales, and directed by Ruíz and his wife Mariem Pérez Riera.

The film consists of three separate stories dealing with the ironies of love. The three stories involve a middle-class family, a hostage situation, and an elderly couple.

Actor Benicio del Toro (who is from Puerto Rico) worked as an executive producer for the film.

On September 24, 2007, the film was chosen to represent Puerto Rico at the 80th Academy Awards to be celebrated February 24, 2008. The film competed with other four Puerto Rican films and was selected after a tie with Jacobo Morales' Angel. The other three films submitted were: El Cimarrón, Ruido, and El Clown.

== Cast ==
- Luis Guzmán as Ismael
- Miguel Ángel Álvarez as Pellín
- Silvia Brito as Flora
- Yaraní del Valle as Luisa
- Edna Lee Figueroa as Tati
- Luis Gonzaga as Miguel
- Teresa Hernández as Lourdes
- Chavito Marrero as Cirilo
- Dolores Pedro as Marta
- Norman Santiago as Macho
- Fernando Tarrazo as Ismaelito
- Roberto Roman as Robeltain
- Georgina Borri as Dona Alma

== Awards ==
Award	Year	Category	Nominee/Recipient	Result	Ref
Cartagena Film Festival	2008	Best Film	Carlitos Ruiz Ruiz, Mariem Pérez Riera	Won	
Cartagena Film Festival	2008	Best Screenplay	Carlitos Ruiz Ruiz, Jorge Gonzales	Won	
Cartagena Film Festival	2008	Best Supporting Actress	Silvia Brito	Won	
Chicago International Film Festival	2008	New Directors	Carlitos Ruiz Ruiz, Mariem Pérez Riera	Won	
Festival de Cine Iberoamericano de Huelva	2008	Golden Colon	Carlitos Ruiz Ruiz, Mariem Pérez Riera	Nominated	
Imagen Foundation Awards	2009	Best Actor	Luis Guzmán	Nominated	
Imagen Foundation Awards	2009	Best Director	Carlitos Ruiz Ruiz	Nominated	
Premios ACE	2009	Best First Work	Carlitos Ruiz Ruiz, Mariem Pérez Riera	Won	
Premios ACE	2009	Best Supporting Actress	Silvia Brito	Won	
São Paulo International Film Festival	2008	International Jury Award	Carlitos Ruiz Ruiz, Mariem Pérez Riera	Nominated	

== See also ==
- Cinema of Puerto Rico
- List of Puerto Ricans in the Academy Awards
