= Gladys Rodríguez =

Puerto Rican actress and writer (born 1943)

- Born: June 4, 1943 (age 82); Santurce, Puerto Rico
- Occupations: Actress, comedian, television host

Gladys Rodríguez (born June 4, 1943) is a Puerto Rican actress, comedian, and television host. She is also a Christian pastor and a priest at an Episcopalian church in Oviedo, Florida, near Orlando, United States.

== Early years ==
Rodríguez was born in Santurce, San Juan, Puerto Rico. She and her parents moved to New York City when she was still a child. In New York, she received her primary and secondary education. When she was eight years old she attended the Children's Hour Academy where she learned tap dancing, drama and ballet.

In 1960, Rodríguez returned to Puerto Rico where she took drama classes under the guidance of Edmundo Rivera Alvarez. She enrolled in the University of Puerto Rico and earned a degree in Dramatic Arts.

== Career ==
=== Television ===
Rodríguez made her television debut when she auditioned for a role in the soap opera La Mujer de Aquella Noche (The Woman of That Night) and performed alongside Braulio Castillo. The soap opera was a success and her acting caught the attention of a Peruvian director who offered her a role in the soap opera Simplemente María-2da. Parte (Simply Mary-Part 2), filmed in Peru. Simplemente María Part 2, became an international success, in Latin America.

In 1971, Rodríguez was cast to play the role of an elderly woman who had abandoned her son in Mami santa produced by Tommy Muñiz. In 1975 Puerto Rican Muñiz offered Rodríguez to play the role of his working class character's wife in the situation comedy Los García. The program reflected the increasingly changing dynamic of Puerto Rican families during the ongoing industrial surge. After the character representing her daughter was married, she decided to leave the production, feeling that playing a mother-in-law would limit her options. The show became very popular and is the longest running series in Puerto Rican television history, considered by many to be a Puerto Rican classic. During that period she also performed the leading roles in the soap operas: Marta Llorens with Raúl Juliá and Juan José Camero, Fue sin Querer (It Wasn't on Purpose) with Sandro de América, Verano Rojo (Red Summer) with Rogelio Guerra and Viernes Social (Social Friday) with Arnaldo André, among others. In 2006, she performed a supporting actress role in Telemundo's soap opera Dueña y Señora, starring Karla Monroig.

In 1991, she appeared in Muñiz's first miniseries, Nadie lo va a saber. In 1993, Rodríguez was part of the supporting cast in Rafo Muñiz's play, La vida en un beso. A series of special revivals of Los García followed, with the first airing on August 28, 1994 and the last on May 4, 1995. WIPR-TV displayed interest in reviving the series, but Muñiz declined.

Rodríguez worked on the post-production stages as actress and Production Designer of the TV mini-series El Regalo which was released in 2006.

In 2007 she hosted a morning talk show Entre Nosotras (Among Us) with Alba Nydia Díaz, among other celebrities.

=== Theater ===
Rodríguez began her theater acting career by acting in the following productions: Un Tranvía llamado Deseo (A Streetcar Named Desire) and Los Soles Truncos (Fanlights) alongside Esther Sandoval, Muerte en el Nilo (Death on the Nile), Palacio de Carton (Cardboard Palace), La Enemiga (The Enemy), El Búho y la gatita (The Owl and the Pussycat), El mismo año a la misma hora (The same year at the same time) and many other more. In the 1990s she starred as Anna in the San Juan production of The King and I, and as the Mother Superior in the San Juan premiere of Sor-Presas (Nunsense). Other productions include Flor de Presidio (1989) and Steel Magnolias.

She belonged to an association of Puerto Rican actresses called MECA, which produced for television programs such as Ellas al Mediodía. Later she joined actresses, Ángela Meyer, Camille Carrion and Marilyn Pupo in the TV program called Ahora (Now).

=== Feature films ===
Rodríguez's first featured movie was the 1979 comedy Dios los cria, playing Annette. Then came the 1982 musical comedy Una Aventura Llamada Menudo alongside Puerto Rican boy band Menudo and Mexican teen actress Alondra. In this film, Rodriguez played matriarchal character Señora Mía. This was followed by the 1989 film Lo que le paso a Santiago (What Happened to Santiago), produced by Pedro Muñiz and written and directed by Jacobo Morales. Lo que le paso a Santiago was nominated for an Oscar in 1989 in the category of Best Foreign Language Film.

== Filmography ==
- Lamento Borincano - uncredited
- Los Expatriados (1964) - uncredited
- Un Largo viaje hacia la muerte (1968) - uncredited
- Dios los cría (And God Created Them) (1979) - Annette
- Una Aventura llamada Menudo (An Adventure Called Menudo) (1982) - Señora Mía
- Cuentos de Don Abelardo
- Lo que le Pasó a Santiago (1989) - Angelina
- Posada Corazon (Novela) (1990)
- El Poder del Shakti (1995)
- Desvío al paraíso (Shortcut to Paradise) (1994) - Lona
- La Guagua aérea (Air Bus) (1995)
- Milagro en Yauco (Miracle in Yauco) (1995)
- Amores como todos los demas (1999) (TV) - Yolanda
- Amores (2004) TV Mini-series (2003) - Seda Blanca
- El Sueño del regreso (2005) - Carlotta
- El Regalo (2006) TV Mini-series - Elizabeth
- The Caller (2011) - Mrs. Guidi

In 1999, she participated in the theater production of La Carreta (The Oxcart) by Rene Marques. That same year, she authored her first book, Aliup, in which she discusses her strong Christian beliefs. On March 15, 2002, she acted in the theater production of Mujeres de la Biblia (Women of the Bible), which was initially presented in the Tapia Theater of San Juan. The production's success in over 60 continuous presentations led the producers to present it outside of Puerto Rico to places like the United States.

== See also ==
- List of Puerto Ricans
- Lo que le Pasó a Santiago
- Braulio Castillo
- Alba Nydia Díaz
- Karla Monroig
- History of women in Puerto Rico
