= Romance in Puerto Rico =

- Directed by: Ramón Pereda
- Written by: Luisa María de Linares (novel); Ramón Pereda
- Produced by: Ramón Pereda
- Starring: María Antonieta Pons; Dagoberto Rodríguez
- Cinematography: Raúl Martínez Solares
- Edited by: Alberto Valenzuela
- Music by: Rafael Hernández
- Production company: Puerto Rico Films
- Release date: 22 November 1962
- Running time: 86 minutes
- Countries: Mexico; Puerto Rico
- Language: Spanish

Romance in Puerto Rico (Spanish:Romance en Puerto Rico) is a 1962 Mexican-Puerto Rican musical film directed and co-written by Ramón Pereda and starring María Antonieta Pons and Dagoberto Rodríguez.

== Cast ==
- José Miguel Agrelot
- Bobby Capó
- Ana Garay
- Velda González
- Gilda Mirós
- Alicia Moreda
- Ramón Pereda
- María Antonieta Pons
- Dagoberto Rodríguez
- Orlando Rodríguez
- Luis Vigoreaux

== Bibliography ==
- García, Joaquín 'Kino' (2014). Historia del Cine Puertorrique¤o (in Spanish). Palibrio. ISBN 978-1-4633-8732-7.
