= Thieves and Liars =

2006 film directed by Ricardo Méndez Matta

Ladrones y Mentirosos Thieves and Liars
- Film poster
- Directed by: Ricardo Méndez Matta
- Written by: Ricardo Méndez Matta; Poli Marichal
- Produced by: Ricardo Méndez Matta; Poli Marichal
- Starring: Steven Bauer; Elpidia Carrillo; Daniel Lugo; Alba Raquel Barros
- Music by: Superaquello
- Distributed by: HBO
- Release dates: March 17, 2006 (Cleveland International Film Festival); October 19, 2006 (Puerto Rico)
- Running time: 114 minutes
- Country: Puerto Rico
- Language: Spanish

Thieves and Liars (Spanish: Ladrones y mentirosos) is a 2006 Puerto Rican film directed by Ricardo Méndez Matta. It was Puerto Rico's submission to the 79th Academy Awards for the Academy Award for Best Foreign Language Film, but was not accepted as a nominee.

== Plot ==
The film is set in the island of Puerto Rico. Because of its central location in the Caribbean, the island has become one of the main ports of drug entry from South America into the United States. The film follows the lives of three families in different levels of society affected by drug trafficking and crime in the island.

== Cast ==
- Steven Bauer as Oscar
- Isidro Bobadilla as Peña
- Elpidia Carrillo as Isabel
- José Heredia as Migue
- Daniel Lugo as Carmona
- Dennis Mario as Luijan
- Lymari Nadal as Marisol
- Carlos Paniagua as Luisito
- Magda Rivera as Wanda
- Luz María Rondón as Doña Norma
- Alba Raquel Barros
- Vico C
- Kaly Cordova as Police Officer

== See also ==
- Cinema of Puerto Rico
- List of submissions to the 79th Academy Awards for Best Foreign Language Film
- List of Puerto Ricans in the Academy Awards
