= 1990 Academy Awards =

1990 Academy Awards may refer to:

- 62nd Academy Awards, the Academy Awards ceremony that took place in 1990
- 63rd Academy Awards, the 1991 ceremony honoring the best in film for 1990
