= Bananas (film) =

1971 comedy film by Woody Allen

- Theatrical release poster by Jack Davis
- Directed by: Woody Allen
- Written by: Woody Allen; Mickey Rose
- Produced by: Jack Grossberg
- Starring: Woody Allen; Louise Lasser; Howard Cosell; Carlos Montalban; Natividad Abascal
- Cinematography: Andrew M. Costikyan
- Edited by: Ron Kalish; Ralph Rosenblum
- Music by: Marvin Hamlisch
- Distributed by: United Artists
- Release date: April 28, 1971 (United States)
- Running time: 82 minutes
- Country: United States
- Language: English
- Budget: $2 million
- Box office: $11.8 million

Bananas is a 1971 American comedy film directed by Woody Allen and starring Allen, Louise Lasser, and Carlos Montalbán. Written by Allen and Mickey Rose, the film is about a bumbling New Yorker who, after being dumped by his activist girlfriend, travels to a tiny Latin American nation and becomes involved in its latest revolution. Parts of the plot are based on the book Don Quixote, U.S.A. by Richard P. Powell.

Filmed on location in New York City and Puerto Rico, the film was released to positive reviews from critics and was number 78 on Bravo's "100 Funniest Movies" and number 69 on AFI's 100 Years...100 Laughs in 2000.

== Plot ==
The film opens with Howard Cosell's coverage of the assassination of the president of the fictional "banana republic" of San Marcos and a coup d'état that brings Gen. Emilio Molina Vargas to power.

Fielding Mellish is a neurotic blue-collar man who tries to impress social activist Nancy by connecting with the revolution in San Marcos. He visits the republic and attempts to show his concern for the native people. However, Vargas secretly orders his men, disguised as Vargas's opponents, to kill Mellish to make the rebels look bad so that the U.S. will send Vargas financial aid. Mellish evades Vargas's assassins but is shortly captured by the real rebels. Vargas declares Mellish dead regardless, leaving Mellish no choice but to join the rebels for two months. Mellish then clumsily learns how to be a revolutionary. When the revolution is successful, it becomes apparent that Esposito, the Castro-style leader, has gone mad. The rebels decide to replace him with Mellish as their president.

While traveling back to the U.S. to obtain financial aid, Mellish (sporting a long fake beard) reunites with Nancy and is exposed. In court, Mellish tries to defend himself from a series of incriminating witnesses, including a reigning Miss America and a middle-aged African-American woman claiming to be J. Edgar Hoover in disguise. One of the witnesses does provide testimony favorable to Mellish, but the court clerk, when asked to read back this testimony, replies with an entirely different, wholly unfavorable rendition. Mellish is eventually sentenced to prison, but his sentence is suspended on the condition that he does not move into the judge's neighborhood. Nancy then agrees to marry him. The film ends with Cosell's coverage of the between-the-covers consummation of their marriage, an event that was over much more quickly than Nancy had anticipated, with Mellish anticipating a rematch in the early spring.

== Cast ==
- Woody Allen as Fielding Mellish
- Louise Lasser as Nancy
- Carlos Montalban as Gen. Emilio Molina Vargas
- Natividad Abascal as Yolanda
- Howard Cosell as himself
- Jacobo Morales as Esposito
- Miguel Ángel Suárez as Luis
- David Ortiz as Sanchez
- René Enríquez as Diaz
- Jack Axelrod as Arroyo
- Roger Grimsby as himself
- Don Dunphy as himself
- Martha Greenhouse as Dr. Feigen
- Dan Frazer as Priest
- Stanley Ackerman as Dr. Mellish
- Charlotte Rae as Mrs. Mellish
- Axel Anderson as Tortured Man
- Dorothi Fox as J. Edgar Hoover

Eddie Barth and Nicholas Saunders make their theatrical film debuts as the characters Paul and Douglas, while comedian Conrad Bain plays Semple and actor Allen Garfield plays the Man on Cross. Uncredited appearances include Sylvester Stallone as a subway thug #1, Mary Jo Catlett as a woman in a hotel lobby and Tino García in an undisclosed role.

Allen was a fan of Cosell’s outsized persona and unmistakable booming nasal twang, punching each syllable as if it was a speedbag. Cosell, always up for lampooning his image, needed little persuading. He flew to Puerto Rico to shoot his segment, delivering a blow-by-blow sports-style account of the political assassination and later Fielding and Nancy’s honeymoon night. In both cases, Allen famously let him improvise the entire commentary on the spot.

== Production ==
=== Development ===
According to an interview in the notes of the film's DVD release, Allen said that there is absolutely no blood in the film (even during executions) because he wanted to keep the light comedic tone of the film intact.

Allen and Lasser had been married from 1966 to 1970 and were divorced at the time the film was made.

The verdict in Mellish's legal case is portrayed as the headline story of a Roger Grimsby newscast. Included in the scene is a parody television advertisement for New Testament cigarettes with a Catholic priest (Dan Frazer) promoting the fictitious brand while performing the sacrament of the Eucharist. The movie received a C (condemned) classification from the National Catholic Office for Motion Pictures because of the spoof.

=== Original title ===
The film was originally titled El Weirdo. The film's screenwriters Woody Allen and Mickey Rose wrote the first 40 pages of the film under the title El Weirdo and submitted it to a producer who rejected it. In the year 1971, a different producer released the completed film under a new title, Bananas.

=== Budget and filming ===
According to a July 1970 Los Angeles Herald Examiner article, Bananas cost $1.7 million and was the first of a three-picture deal Allen had with United Artists. A riot scene involving 2,000 students was shot at Queens Community College in New York.

The scene where musicians appear to play instruments in pantomime at General Vargas's dinner was not originally planned; the rented instruments had not arrived on set, and Allen decided the miming fit the film's tone.

According to Julian Fox's biography Woody: Movies from Manhattan, the film originally had a different ending in which Fielding, invited to make a revolutionary speech at Columbia University, would emerge from an explosion in blackface. Co-editor Ralph Rosenblum convinced Allen to change it.

=== Theatrical title ===
The title is a pun, "bananas" being slang for "crazy", as well as being a reference to the phrase "banana republic" describing the film's setting. When Allen was asked why the film was called Bananas, his reply was, "Because there are no bananas in it." Some writers have made the connection between this and The Cocoanuts, the first film by the Marx Brothers, by whom Allen was heavily influenced at the time, and which featured no coconuts.

== Music ==
- Quiero la Noche, words and music by Marvin Hamlisch
- Cause I Believe in Loving, music by Marvin Hamlisch, lyrics by Howard Liebling, sung by Jake Holmes
- 1812 Overture in E Flat, Op.49 (1880), written by Pyotr Ilyich Tchaikovsky
- Naughty Marietta (1910), music by Victor Herbert

== Reception ==
=== Box office ===
Bananas was the number one film at the U.S. box office on May 2, 1971, for one week, and finished as the 18th highest-grossing film of 1971.

=== Critical response ===
Bananas was well received by critics. On the review aggregator website Rotten Tomatoes, 83% of 35 critics' reviews are positive, with an average rating of 7.5/10. Metacritic, which uses a weighted average, assigned the film a score of 67 out of 100, based on 7 critics, indicating "generally favorable" reviews. Vincent Canby of The New York Times praised the film, saying: "Allen's view of the world is fraught with everything except pathos, and it's a view I happen to find very funny. Here is no little man surviving with a wan smile and a shrug, but a runty, wise-mouthed guy whose initial impulses toward cowardice seem really heroic in the crazy order of the way things are." He concluded: "Any movie that attempts to mix together love, Cuban revolution, the C.I.A., Jewish mothers, J. Edgar Hoover and a few other odds and ends (including a sequence in which someone orders 1,000 grilled cheese sandwiches) is bound to be a little weird—and most welcome." Gene Siskel of the Chicago Tribune gave the film three stars out of four and called the opening scene "one of the funniest bits of film," though he thought the romance "gets in the way" and "could have been omitted easily."

Charles Champlin of the Los Angeles Times wrote: "Allen seems to have been unable to figure a suitable finish for the plot, which does not so much peak as stop. Still the best jokes have a glorious insanity about them. Given the diminishing ability to laugh like blazing idiots these days, Bananas is welcome even if Allen is not quite at the top of his form." Gary Arnold of The Washington Post wrote that the film was "in a word, hilarious," and "an immense improvement" over Take the Money and Run. Richard Combs of The Monthly Film Bulletin thought that "the gags seem a little brighter than in Take the Money," but also found the scattershot humor "too undisciplined and disparate." John Simon wrote of the film's plot: "None of it makes for sense or solidly developing humor, and much of it is in bad taste".

Pauline Kael of The New Yorker wrote that the "inexplicably funny took over; it might be grotesque; it almost always had the flippant, corny bawdiness of a frustrated sophomore running amok, but it seemed to burst out, as the most inspired comedy does."

=== Accolades ===
- 2000: AFI's 100 Years...100 Laughs – #69
- 2015: Writers Guild of America's 101 Funniest Screenplays – #69
