= Norma Candal =

Puerto Rican actress and comedian

- Born: Norma Daniela Candal Penedo; April 10, 1927; Fajardo, Puerto Rico
- Died: February 5, 2006 (aged 78); Santurce, Puerto Rico
- Resting place: Santa María Magdalena de Pazzis Cemetery
- Occupations: Actress; Television host; Teacher

Norma Daniela Candal Penedo (April 10, 1927 – February 5, 2006), was a Puerto Rican actress and comedian who was best known for her role as Petunia on La criada malcriada.

== Early years ==
Norma Daniela Candal Penedo was born in 1927 in Fajardo, Puerto Rico to Eladio José Candal and María Isabel Penedo. She lived with her family on the Fajardo Sugar Company's sugar plantation, where her father was an accountant. She attended the Colegio del Sagrado Corazon (Sacred Heart School) in her hometown, where she obtained her primary and secondary education. When she was 9 years old, she participated in her first Christmas school play.

Candal enrolled in the Universidad del Sagrado Corazón, where she earned a Bachelor's degree in Humanities. She was planning on a political career and was going to study political sciences, however after she was granted a scholarship to The Catholic University of America (CUA) in Washington, D.C., she changed her goals and went on to earn her Master's Degree in Theater. Candal returned to Puerto Rico upon her graduation.

Candal was also a literature and acting teacher.

== "Petunia" ==
In 1965, she was hired by Rafael Perez Perry as the host of the television show En Alas de la Imaginacion (On the Wings of the Imagination) which aired on WKVM TV Channel 11. Shortly thereafter, she joined Tommy Muñiz Productions in Channel 4 WAPA TV.

It was during this period of time that Candal garnered fame in Puerto Rico. She worked in the shows Aquí con Norma (Here with Norma); El Show del Mediodía (The Midday Show), and La Criada Malcriada (The Rude Maid), in which she played the comical role of Petunia, a simple-minded maid. This is the role which garnered her the most fame of her career. She also hosted or co-hosted talk shows.

In 1970, there was a strike against Tommy Muñiz Productions, which forced Candal to leave the show and join ASTRA Productions, for which she did a couple of shows. Candal stopped working in television for several years after undergoing open heart surgery in which she had a valve replacement.

In 1980, Candal went to work for Cardinal Luis Aponte Martínez at the Cathedral of San Juan. In 1985, she returned to television and starred as Doña Tere in La Pensión de Doña Tere (Mrs. Tere's Boarding House). She participated in the Spanish-language version of the play Steel Magnolias; The Letters of Mozart; The Old Maids of San Sebastian Street, and Kisses on the Forehead.

== Later years ==
She played different roles in the films Díos los Cría 1 and its sequel, (God Creates Them, parts 1 & 2). The first part was filmed and released in 1979, the second in 2004. In between she also appeared in La Guagua Aérea (Flight of Dreams) in 1993.

== Death ==
On Friday, February 3, 2006, Candal suffered a fall in her home in Trujillo Alto, hitting her head on the floor. She was hospitalized at the Pavia Hospital in San Juan where she suffered additional complications from the loss of blood. Candal died on Sunday, February 5, 2006, aged 78. She was buried alongside her mother at Santa María Magdalena de Pazzis Cemetery in Old San Juan, Puerto Rico. Candal was survived by her two children, Norma and Andres Jr.

== See also ==
- List of Puerto Ricans
