= ...And God Created Them =

1979 film

- Film poster
- Directed by: Jacobo Morales
- Written by: Jacobo Morales
- Produced by: Leslie Colombani; Blanca Silvia Eró
- Starring: Norma Candal
- Cinematography: Carmelo Rivera
- Release date: May 1979
- Running time: 120 minutes
- Country: Puerto Rico
- Language: Spanish
- Budget: $200,000

...And God Created Them (Spanish: Díos los Cría...) is a 1979 Puerto Rican comedy film directed by Jacobo Morales. It was screened in the Un Certain Regard section at the 1981 Cannes Film Festival. It featured an ensemble cast made up mainly of Puerto Rican acting stars.

== Plot ==
The film consists of five vignettes:

- Dios los cría – A rich industrialist has died, leaving two sons and his widow (a buxom young woman) as heirs. While his body lies on a public wake, both brothers sob and hug tenderly, after which one of them sneaks out of the funeral parlor, goes to the father's office, opens the office's safe and steals the cash inside it. On his way out, he's confronted by his brother, who points a gun at him. They exchange words about their individual relationship, as well as how they related to their father and how his widow would not deserve any part of the old man's estate. They start to argue and get into a physical confrontation. One of the brothers shoots the other, but the wounded one shoots back the other in return with a gun he pulls from his coat. At the end, all three family members lie in caskets at the funeral parlor as the young widow wickedly smiles at the camera.
- Negocio redondo – Don Marcos, the lead of a construction company (and a lecherous old man who constantly imagines women around him being naked) visits the local Roman Catholic archbishop. They are discussing the last details of a land plot's purchase. Don Marcos tries to outsmart the archbishop when they negotiate the contract's terms, but the archbishop proves to be a clever negotiator. Once they sign the contract and the deal is closed, Don Marcos returns to his office, but has second thoughts and asks his chauffeur to drive him back to the archbishop's office. He asks for a private audience to confess his sins, to which the archbishop agrees. Besides conceding on his lewd behavior, Don Marcos reveals the archbishop that the plot he has sold to the church is overvalued, since a major road will soon run through it. The archbishop threatens to sue him and his company, to which Don Marcos reminds him that this fact has been revealed to him under confession, and therefore, cannot be revealed under penalty of excommunion. The archbishop reluctantly absolves the manager of his sins, and Don Marcos returns to his office, expressionless.
- La Gran Noche – an aging prostitute is being teased by her fellow sex workers on the bordello they all work at. By now, no client asks for her services. One night, a handsome young man shows up, rejects the offers from the other prostitutes, and takes the aging one for a dance but not before earning general admiration from everyone by disposing of a drunk rude customer. They leave the premises under the surprised looks of all the attendants. They stop at a park, where she is dropped by the customer (the vignette has been acted silently up to this point). The customer dismisses her rudely after she pays him, but not before pulling a knife on her over a disagreement on money matters; it turns out she had paid him to act the entire time. When she sits at a bench to ponder her future, a gallant old man plays compliment to her "beautiful eyes", provoking a tender smile in her.
- Entre doce y una – Business partners Alberto and Carlos chat in their high rise building office as Carlos uncomfortably expects Alberto to abandon the place. Suddenly, Alberto's stunningly beautiful wife, Annette, appears at the scene to the apparent surprise of both men, after which they all go out together to lunch. After they get into an elevator car, a severe earthquake hits the city. The car loses power, and when they try to escape through a hatch on the top, they find the elevator's cables are frayed (and at least one has snapped). While they scream for help (and somebody offers to get them out in a matter of hours) tempers flare and the cables keep on snapping. Calmly resigned to a certain death and having some time to spend, the couple reveal each other their indiscretions. After Alberto confesses his infidelities, Annette tells him not only that she has also been unfaithful, she reveals that Carlos is her lover at the present time and that she came to meet him at the office while Alberto was supposed to be somewhere else when she arrived. Since nothing of that seemed to matter anymore, now that they are going to die, a repentant Alberto surprisingly forgives Annette and Carlos, hugging them in an emotionally tearful and tender final moment which is abruptly broken by an external voice shouting good news: help is coming ! Happiness and relief invades them, knowing they will survive the ordeal but after what seems to be a new beginning in life for them all, Alberto says that the way he behaved before was a weakness due to the death scare, that it means nothing now and starts hinting that everything changes, more so after what he already knows about his cheating wife and his partner. To the amazement of Carlos and Annette, who are sincerely regretful and remorseful about their actions, Alberto turns into his older vengeful self, angrily implying he wants to be by himself with nothing to do with them anymore. Both men fight, causing the elevator to shake as the remaining cable snaps, resulting in the elevator car plummeting down.
- La Otra – Fernando, a traveling salesman, appears in alternate scenes with two women. The older woman, Josefina, reminds him to take care of his health, offers him dinner, and looks after him at home; the younger one, Marie, is constantly interested in having passionate sex with him. He seems to be an absentee partner to both, and each one resents his absences. One day Marie finds Fernando with Josefina, and they have a quarrel; it turns out that Josefina, the older, domestically oriented woman, is the man's lover, while sex-hungry Marie is the wife. He then sets the record 'straight' by divorcing his young wife, marrying his older lover... and remains domestic to Josefina while still having frequent sexual episodes with Marie.

== Cast ==
- Jámés Ard as José (segment "La Otra")
- Norma Candal as Josefina (segment "La Otra")
- Carlos Augusto Cestero as Hustler (segment "La Gran Noche")
- Pedro Juan Figueroa as Arnaldo (segment "Dios Los Cria")
- Daniel Lugo as Carlos (segment "Entre Doce Y Una")
- Chavito Marrero as Don Marcos (segment "Negocio Redondo") (as José Luis Marrero)
- Benjamín Morales as Bishop (segment "Negocio Redondo"), Don Manuel (segment "La Otra")
- Jacobo Morales as Alberto Palacios (segment "Entre Doce Y Una"), Fernando Sepúlveda (segment "La Otra")
- Alicia Moreda
- Gladys Rodríguez as Annette (segment "Entre Doce Y Una"), Marie (segment "La Otra")
- Esther Sandoval as Old Prostitute (segment "La Gran Noche")
- Miguel Ángel Suárez as Arnaldo's brother (segment "Dios Los Cría"), New Boss (segment "La Otra"), rowdy drunk customer (segment "La Gran Noche")
- Luis Vera
- Otilio Warrington
