= List of Puerto Rican Academy Award winners and nominees =

This is a list of Puerto Rican Academy Award winners and nominees by category. It details the performances of Puerto Rican-born filmmakers, actors, actresses and films that have either been nominated for or have won an Academy Award.

This list is current as of the 98th Academy Awards ceremony held on March 15, 206.

== Best Actor ==
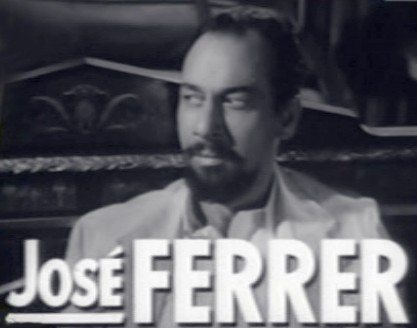
José Ferrer was the first Latino and Puerto Rican to be nominated for and win an Oscar for acting, receiving a nomination for Best Supporting Actor for Joan of Arc (1948) and winning Best Actor for Cyrano de Bergerac (1950).

Academy Award for Best Actor
Year	Nominee	Film	Status	Notes	Ref(s)
1950 (23rd)	José Ferrer	Cyrano de Bergerac	Won	First Latino and Puerto Rican male or female actor to be nominated for and win a leading acting category. Only Latino male actor to win a leading acting category.	
1952 (25th)	José Ferrer	Moulin Rouge	Nominated	First Latino and Puerto Rican male or female actor to be nominated more than once in an acting category.	

== Best Supporting Actor ==
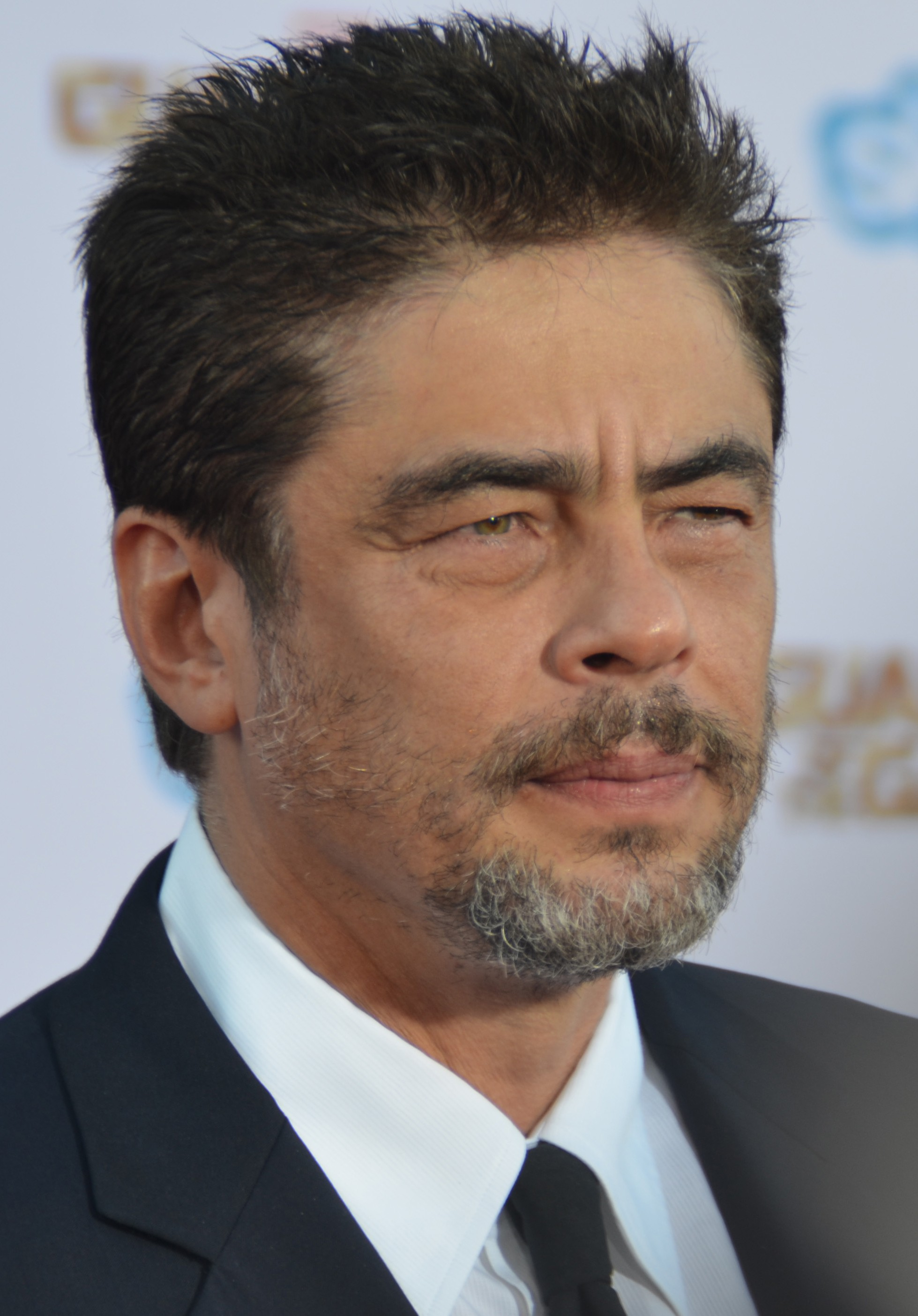
Benicio del Toro won once from two nominations for Best Supporting Actor, winning for Traffic (2000) and becoming the first actor to win for a Spanish-speaking role.

Academy Award for Best Supporting Actor
Year	Nominee	Film	Status	Notes	Ref(s)
1948 (21st)	José Ferrer	Joan of Arc	Nominated	First Latino and Puerto Rican male or female actor to be nominated for an acting Academy Award. First Latino and Puerto Rican male or female actor to be nominated in a supporting acting category. First Puerto Rican to be nominated in any category.	
2000 (73rd)	Benicio del Toro	Traffic	Won	First and only male actor to win for a Spanish-speaking role.	
2003 (75th)	Benicio del Toro	21 Grams	Nominated		
2025 (98th)	Benicio del Toro	One Battle After Another	Nominated		

== Best Supporting Actress ==
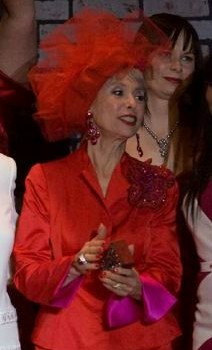
Rita Moreno was the first Latina and Puerto Rican to win an Oscar for acting, winning Best Supporting Actress for West Side Story (1961).

Academy Award for Best Supporting Actress
Year	Nominee	Film	Status	Notes	Ref(s)
1961 (34th)	Rita Moreno	West Side Story	Won	First Latina and Puerto Rican female actor to win an acting Academy Award.	

== Best Adapted Screenplay ==
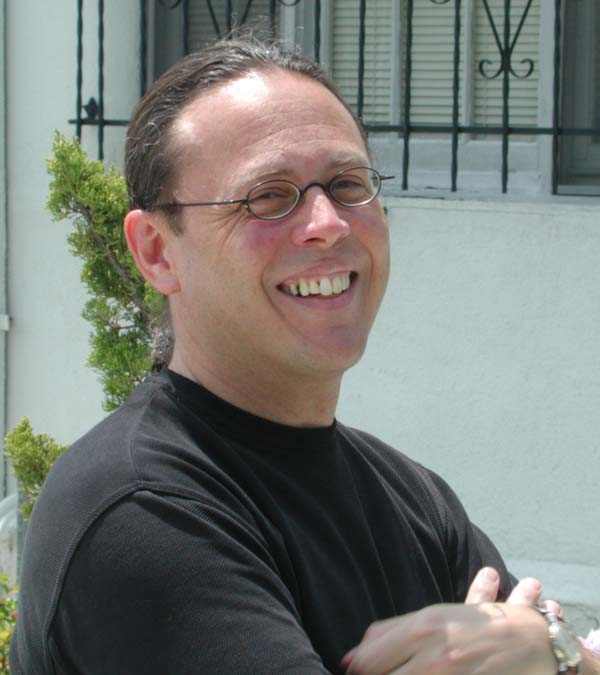
José Rivera was the first Puerto Rican screenwriter to be nominated for an Oscar, receiving a Best Adapted Screenplay nomination for Diarios de Motocicleta (2004).

Academy Award for Best Adapted Screenplay
Year	Screenwriter(s)	Film	Status	Notes	Ref(s)
2004 (77th)	José Rivera	Diarios de Motocicleta	Nominated	First Puerto Rican screenwriter to be nominated in a screenplay category.	

== Best Foreign Language Film ==
Puerto Rico has submitted films for the Foreign Film category since 1985, with only one film having been nominated. In 1990, Lo que le Pasó a Santiago (from Jacobo Morales) was nominated, losing to Italy's Cinema Paradiso.

In October 2011, awards coordinator Torene Svitil announced that as a territory of the United States, Puerto Rico would no longer be eligible for submissions in the Foreign Language Film category.

Academy Award for Best Foreign Language Film
Year	Director(s)	Film	Status	Notes	Ref(s)
1989 (62nd)	Jacobo Morales	Lo que le Pasó a Santiago	Nominated	First and only Puerto Rican film to be nominated for Best Foreign Language Film.	
~~2011~~; ~~(84th)~~	~~Sonia Fritz~~	~~America~~	Disqualified	In 2011, AMPAS announced they would no longer accept submissions from territories of the United States.	

== All categories ==
Decade	1930s	1940s	1950s	1960s	1970s	1980s	1990s	2000s	2010s	2020s	Total
Wins	-	-	1	1	-	-	-	1	-	-	3
Nominations	-	1	1	-	-	1	-	2	-	1	6
Total nominations	-	1	2	1	-	1	-	3	-	1	9

Note: This list only includes individuals who were born in Puerto Rico. See List of Hispanic Academy Award winners and nominees for individuals of Puerto Rican descent born outside Puerto Rico, including the United States proper, who have either been nominated for or won an Academy Award.

== See also ==
- Cinema of Puerto Rico
- List of Puerto Ricans
- History of women in Puerto Rico
