= Jacobo Morales =

Puerto Rican actor (born 1934)

- Born: Jacobo Morales Ramírez; November 12, 1934 (age 91); Lajas, Puerto Rico
- Occupations: Actor; poet; writer; playwright; director; auteur
- Years active: 1950–present
- Spouse: Blanca Silvia Eró

Jacobo Morales (born 12 November 1934) is a Puerto Rican actor, poet, writer, playwright, filmmaker, and author. His work in television include Desafiando a los Genios, Esto no tiene Nombre, La Tiendita de la Esquina, among many others. During this time, he also started working with the political satire and comedy group Los Rayos Gamma, together with journalist Eddie López. The group still performs at theaters occasionally, and in the '80s and '90s had several shows on television. In theatre, he has starred in over 30 plays, and he has written and directed five.

Many consider him the most influential film director in Puerto Rico's history. His first directing work was the film Dios los cría... in 1980. The film was an important event in the Puerto Rican film history and received several awards. It was also selected as one of the 25 most significant films of Latin America. He followed it with Nicolás y los demás in which he also had the starring role. For this performance he received the Best Actor Award at the Cartagena de Indias Festival in Colombia, 1986. His third film, Lo que le pasó a Santiago, was nominated for the Academy Award for Best Foreign Language Film in 1990.

== Early life ==
Morales was born in the town of Lajas, Puerto Rico, to parents who were shepherds in th countryside of Puerto Rico. Morales began studying theatre at the University of Puerto Rico (UPR), where he would coincide with Paquito Cordero.

== Career ==
He started acting in radio and theater when he was only 14 years old. He began working in television at its inception in 1954, working as an actor, writer and director. For the second incarnation of Desafiando a los Genios, Morales served as host, being harassed by the characters in the panel, in particular Castro's cross dressing character of Ramoneta Cienfuegos de la O. In 1967, Morales was incorporated to the cast of Gloria y Miguel. During this timeframe, he would also be given the role of the general in the military comedy El special de Corona. Morales was also left in charge of La comedia histórica a historic comedy segment. He was one of several performers and script writers for the sketch show Esto no tiene nombre, which required several hours of writing per episode since it aired over a hundred different jokes per hour. As Producciones Tommy Muñiz began producing telenovelas, Morales also became involved in the creative side of these.

When Rafael Enrique Saldaña suffered health complications, Morales served as replacement in the telenovela Mami santa. Cultural show Borinquen canta debuted in 1971, with Morales being a role where he interpreted poems that were self-authored. His performance gathered the interest of a number of editorials, who offered publishing his work. Actor José Reymundí began a strike against Producciones Tommy Muñiz in 1973, in particular against its administrator Hérnan Nigaglioni, claiming that he had been left out of a local production to favor foreigners. Soon afterwards, he was joined by more people as APATE joined and people like Castro decided not to cross the protest lines, while others like Candal actively joined the protests. Morales in turn decided to quit on the air. Only Alida Arizmendi challenged the protests. WAPA-TV decided not to intervene and distanced itself from the issue.

In the end, Muñiz granted the demands of the protestors, such as health coverage or six month contracts, but Reymundí was unable to benefit due to the cancellation of the production due to the strike. Producciones Tommy Muñiz was affected by it, with only productions like Esto no tiene nombre or Ja-ja, ji-ji, jo-jo con Agrelot surviving. Candal, Morales, Warrington, Carbia, Molina and García left to create Producciones Astra and joined Channel 7. This would only last for some years, since the company gained a reputation as supporting work syndicates and were avoided.

After Channel 11 went bankrupt, Los Rayos Gamma moved to Muñiz's channel, WRIK-TV. The group debuted on November 1, 1981. For Morales, it was the first time seeing the producer since the strike. With a loose concept Los siete del Siete would take over the prime time slot Thursdays, and be host by a number of local talents including Agrelot, Morales, Olivo, Avellanet, Jovet and Logroño. He was along several figures, including Los Gamma, that participated in the inauguration of Súper Siete following the sale of the channel.

Disappointed at the status of the industry and the proliferation of lowbrow comedy, Muñiz entered a semi-retirement and spent most of his days at Culebra. Eventually, Rafo approached him about a return to theatre with a play named Los muchachos de la alegría, which was accepted and Morales was brought in to direct and as part of the cast. Agrelot was initially considered to lead the cast, but his issues with scripted work lead to the reconciliation of Muñiz and Cordero after two decades of estrangement. The play was a hit and moved from Bellas Artes to Teatro Tapia and then left San Juan to be shown at Mayagüez and Ponce, totaling over 30 shows.

In 1970, Morales collaborated with Víctor Cuchi in the experimental episodic film Cinco cuentos en blanco y negro, which debuted at the Instituto de Cultura Puertorriqueña. During this decade he performed in Hollywood productions such as Woody Allen's Bananas and Up the Sandbox with Barbra Streisand. Popular with the Puerto Rican diaspora, the film adaptation of La criada malcriada set a new record in Columbia Pictures' Latin market. The movie also market the debut of Morales as film director. In 1969, Morales was cast in detective drama Arocho y Clemente.

During the second half of the 1960s, producers had opted to leave the production of purely local films and became involved in a number of co-productions with Mexican producers. These films, however, were poorly received by the Puerto Rican public. After years of this pattern, Morales opted to resume the production of local films and published Dios los cría in 1980. His wife, Blanca Eró, joined Pedro Muñiz as producer in Morales's Producciones Dios los Cría, named after his eponymous film. Debuting as a director, Morales adopted a trend where he would set his films in contemporary times, but depicting a nostalgic glance on olden times, especially in regards to moral beliefs that had fallen in disuse. Considered "akin to European cinema", his style proved economically successful in Puerto Rico. The cynical take on consumerism Dios los cría (1980), depicted a series of interconnected stories that mixed comedy, black humor and twist endings and gathered a positive reception.

Five years later, he directed and starred in Nicolás y los demás. The film focused on synchronicity and how it is capable of changing lives, did not repeat the success of its predecessor, but it was exhibited at the Festival del Nuevo Cine Latinoamericano. For his performance in this film, Morales won the best actor award in the Cartagena de Indias Film Festival. They would then be involved in a successful campaign to allow Puerto Rican films to compete at the "Best Foreign Film" category of the Oscars. In 1990, Morales produced Lo que le pasó a Santiago, which was well received by the local public and was the first local film to receive a nomination for the Academy Awards. For this project he was more ambitious. Morales argued that as long as the product had a respectable quality, industrial film could prove a success locally.

Following the last show of the play Los muchachos de la alegría, Morales approached veteran television producer and actor Tommy Muñiz about entering the film industry as the titular character. Morales began the process with $45,000 acquired from the Institute of Puerto Rican Culture (ICP). Pedro Muñiz had accepted the initial offering, having managed to secure a flow of income with his negotiations in the sale of WRIK-TV, but remained skeptical that the film could be capable of gathering earnings. Morales and the younger Muñiz managed to secure $100,000 more, a fifth part of the final cost of the project, by holding around 120 presentations for potential investors.

Filming began with Santiago, Angelina and the other characters being adapted to the personalities of the actors, with the initiative of Morales. After those funds became depleted, a loan was granted by the Banco Gubernamental de Fomento. Filming did not stop despite these arrangements, extending during seven weeks with work days ranging from 14-20 daily hours. Edition and promotional arrangements then took place. The local debut was delayed due to the passing of Hurricane Hugo during September, which also lead to it being a hit during the recovery period. The staff received an invitation to present a dubbed version of the film at the Latin American Film Festival held on Washington D.C. on October 26, 1989. The film was then showed at the Festival de Cine Iberoamericano and the Festival de Cine Español, both in Spain. During these events, they perceived that the international public could identify with the blue collar problems of Santiago. Having been showed in time for the 1990 Academy Awards, the staff decided to enter that year's competition and added subtitles to the film within the few months available before the January 1990 deadline. This process was concurrent with the international post-production and Pedro Muñiz traveling to Hollywood, where he reached an agreement with a purported company interested in acquiring the North American rights and which claimed that it would open The New York Shakespeare Festival, only to be later revealed as a fraud.

This was one of two incidents, with the other being a phantom company that disappeared after arrangements were made for international distribution. Despite the interest of the diaspora, distribution outside of Puerto Rico was hindered by these events. Following reunions with members of the Academy, Pedro Muñiz returned and received a $50,000 grant from the Legislature of Puerto Rico. On February 14, 1990, the producer was unable to sleep and took the initiative of contacting the Academy to know the nominees, among which was Lo que le pasó a Santiago, which he took with euphoria along his father. Morales was more contemplative in receiving the news. More showings were scheduled following the announcement.

The staff participated in the directors dinner, during which they were approached by Stanley Kramer and discussed Cyrano de Bergerac which he had directed and lead to José Ferrer becoming the only Latin American to win an Oscar in the "Best Actor" category. Others, like Steven Spielberg and Gregory Peck, commented favorably about the film. During the ceremony, they arrived late due to their driver's inexperience, which lead to them arriving during the headliner's parade. Ultimately, Cinema Paradiso won the Oscar in the category. The elder Muñiz couple returned to the hotel with their grandson, Pedrito Muñiz, while the Morales couple and Pedro Muñiz attended the Governor's Ball. The project ended costing $500,000 in total, with all of the debts being successfully paid.

In 1994, he followed it with Linda Sara which starred singer Chayanne and former Miss Universe Dayanara Torres. The plot depicted with irony how a high-class family had fallen on hard times. The film received the Award for Best Artistic Contribution at the Latin American Film Festival in Trieste, Italy; the People's Choice Award at the Mar del Plata Festival in Argentina; and the Best Script and Best Music Award at the Latin American Film Festival in New York City.

In 2004, Morales directed Dios los cría II, the sequel to his first film, broadcast by WIPR-TV in Puerto Rico. In 2007, his Angel, a full-length feature film, was released to much critical praise. It was considered for submission for the 80th Academy Awards but it lost to Maldeamores in a voting of the Puerto Rico Film Corporation.

For the 40th anniversary of Puerto Rican television, TeleOnce aired a special titled 40 Kilates de Televisión produced by Rafo Muñiz in which he made an appearance. On October 19, 1995, a revival of Esto no tiene nombre was aired under the name Esto sigue sin nombre. On February 3, 1997, Morales participated in Los 75 años de don Tommy, a special dedicated to Muñiz's career.

== Filmography ==
=== Actor ===
- La Criada Malcriada - 1965, also writer
- Bananas - 1971, with Woody Allen
- Up the Sandbox - 1972, with Barbra Streisand (played Fidel Castro)
- ...And God Created Them (Dios los cría) - 1979
- An Ordinary Day (Nicolás y los demás) - 1986
- What Happened to Santiago (Lo que le pasó a Santiago) - 1989
- San Juan Story (Los cuentos de Abelardo) - 1990, 'Peyo Mercé teaches English' segment, based on stories written by Abelardo Díaz Alfaro
- Linda Sara - 1994
- The Effects of Magic - 1998
- Angelito mio - 1998
- Desandando la Vida - 2003
- Dios los cría II - 2004
- Ángel - 2007
- Broche de Oro - 2012
- Broche de Oro: Comienzos - 2017
- Debí Tirar Más Fotos - 2024, short film

=== Director/Writer ===
- ...And God Created Them (Dios los cría) - 1979
- An Ordinary Day (Nicolás y los demás) - 1986
- What Happened to Santiago (Lo que le pasó a Santiago) - 1989, with Tommy Muñiz & Gladys Rodríguez
- Linda Sara - 1994, with Chayanne & Dayanara Torres
- ...And God Created Them 2 (Dios los cría II) - 2004
- Ángel - 2007

== See also ==
- List of Puerto Ricans
- Cinema of Puerto Rico
- List of Puerto Ricans in the Academy Awards
- Lo que le pasó a Santiago
- Gladys Rodríguez
- Tommy Muñiz
- Chayanne
- Raulito Carbonell
