= Rosita Velázquez =

Puerto Rican comedian, actress and singer (1950–2025)

Rosa Idalia Velázquez (Spanish: [ˈrosa iˈðalja βeˈlaskes]; July 29, 1950 – July 28, 2025), better known as Rosita Velázquez (Spanish: [roˈsita βeˈlaskes]), was a Puerto Rican comedian, actress and singer. She was best known for her participation in television comedy shows such as "Mi Hippie me Encanta" ("I Love my Hippie"), "En Casa de JuanMa y Wiwi" ("At Juanma and Wiwi's House") and "Los Kakukómicos" ("The Kakucomics"). As a singer, Velázquez was a member of the popular Puerto Rican music group, "Moliendo Vidrio".

== Early life ==
Velázquez was born in the San Juan barrio of Santurce. She moved to Ponce, Puerto Rico at a young age and was closely identified with that city through her life.

In Ponce, Velázquez first studied acting, at the Santa María Academy. She was part of the "Scarlett Letter" ensemble (an acting troupe) there. She also played the "Roxanne" character on the "Cyrano of Bergerac" play.

== Career ==
Velázquez decided to join the University of Puerto Rico drama department as a young woman. She was interested in theater and participated in some notable plays such as "La Mandrágora" ("The Mandrake"), "El Efecto de los Rayos Gamma Sobre la Flor Maravilla" ("The Effect of Gamma Rays on Man-in-the-Moon Marigolds") and "Los de la Mesa 10" ("Those on Table 10").

Velázquez was noticed by Myrna Casas, who recommended her to "Yoyo Boing", a local actor and comedian, for an upcoming television program, and so, at age 20, in November 1970, she debuted on the Telemundo television comedy, "Mi Hippie me Encanta". Velázquez was so well received by the Puerto Rican audiences that, two months later, she was interviewed on El Mundo newspaper, where she expressed a preference for theater work instead. At "Mi Hippie me Encanta", Velázquez shared scenes with "Boing" (Puerto Rican actor Luis Antonio Rivera) and actress Margot Deben and another actor, Vicente Vázquez.

Velázquez was so popular among the same Puerto Rican audiences, that she, like Luz Odilia Font, had a unique contract that allowed her to work at two television channels at the same time. Soon, she was cast for the canal 7, "Teleluz" show "Como Ser Feliz En El Matrimonio" ("How to be Happy During Marriage"), which was shown midday during weekdays. However, after the show ended its run, she opted to stay at Telemundo instead.

However, she was so sought after that, as she continued working at Telemundo, she was also hired by Telemundo's main rival, Televicentro, by Tommy Muniz, to work on Muniz's productions, "Esto no Tiene Nombre" ("This Has no Name") and "Jaja, Jiji, Jojo con Agrelot", as a show host. In "Jaja, Jiji, Jojo con Agrelot", she shared hosting responsibilities with legendary comedian and show host José Miguel Agrelot.

In 1973, a major strike affected Puerto Rico's television's acting industry, including Velázquez. She decided to join Adrian García and Carmen Belen Richardson, among others, in forming the "Astra" acting company. Being a member of "Astra" allowed her to keep earning money and popularity as a television actress, as she participated at canal 7's show "Ahí Va Eso" ("There Goes That") and at canal 11's show, "Sin Ton Ni Son" ("Without Rhyme Nor Reason"). That same year (1973), Velázquez was in a telenovela named "Claudia y Virginia", where she acted alongside Camille Carrion and Pedro Juan Figueroa, among others.

=== Singing career ===
After the Puerto Rican actors' strike was over and things returned to normalcy on the television acting front, Velázquez tried her hand at singing, debuting with Sunshine Logrono, himself a singer, television actor and comedian also, at a theater in San Juan. This led to them forming part, along with Gary Nuñez among others, of a band named "Moliendo Vidrio con el Pecho" ("Cutting Glass With Our Chests", which would later shorten their name to "Moliendo Vidrio", or, simply, "Cutting Glass"). At "Moliendo Vidrio", she would only participate in one album, but the experience provided her with a break from television work before she was hired for what were perhaps the two shows that were the biggest audience hits in her television acting career.

=== After "Moliendo Vidrio con el Pecho" ===
In 1976, Paquito Cordero, the Puerto Rican television producer, wanted to make a show that was both a family and adult-oriented comedy show, with jokes that could be funny to children and also understood by grown-ups as "double entendre" jokes. Thus, he created "En Casa de JuanMa y Wiwi", a show which lasted 14 years on Puerto Rican television on canal 2. Velázquez chose for her character to be named like her, and so she played the eponymous "Rosita", the meddling neighbor of "JuanMa" (played by Juan Manuel Lebron) and "Wiwi" (played by Awilda Carbia). Benito Mateo played Velázquez's husband, "Benny".

In 1980, Paquito Cordero debuted another comedy show at Telemundo Puerto Rico, canal 2. The new show was named "Los Kakukomicos" ("The Kakucomics", a name that closely sounded like Telemundo's station's call-sign of WKAQ). Velázquez was hired to play "Gloria Notesmande", the best friend and collaborator of Otilio Warrington's character, "Cuca Gómez". In "Los Kakukomicos, Velázquez also shared acting credits with Juan Manuel Lebron as well as with Adrian Garcia, Raquel Montero, "Machuchal", Shorty Castro, Lourdes Chacon and many others.

In 1984, Velázquez became a show host, joining Luis Antonio Cosme and Cuban Rolando Barral in a Saturday evenings game show named "Super Sabados".

Later, a chance for Velázquez to return to canal 11 arrived, when she was hired to co-host, alongside Venezuelan-Mexican actor Raul Vale, the show "R Con R" ("R With R"). In 1988, she returned to canal 2 to host a game show named "Fantástico" ("Fantastic", not to be confused with the Italian television show of the same name), alongside Argentine Jorge Martinez and Puerto Rican singer Aldo Matta.

Late in 1988, on December 11 precisely, Velázquez returned to Televicentro (WAPA-TV, canal 4) to work on a show named "Domingo de Oro" ("Golden Sunday"), together with Hector Marcano and Francisco Zamora.

Disillusioned with the Puerto Rican television industry after "Golden Sunday", Velázquez decided to retire after that and her participation at "En Casa de JuanMa y Wiwi" had finished.

=== Burger King commercial ===
Velázquez once recorded a television commercial with José Miguel Agrelot for the Burger King restaurants chain.

== Personal life and death ==
Velázquez was married to WKAQ-Radio producer Huberto Biaggi until his death in March 2008.

She battled polymyositis.

Velázquez died at her house on July 28, 2025, one day before her 75th birthday.

== Filmography ==
- Enrique Blanco (1973, Dominican Republic-Puerto Rico co-production)

== See also ==
- List of Puerto Ricans
