= List of Puerto Rican comedians =

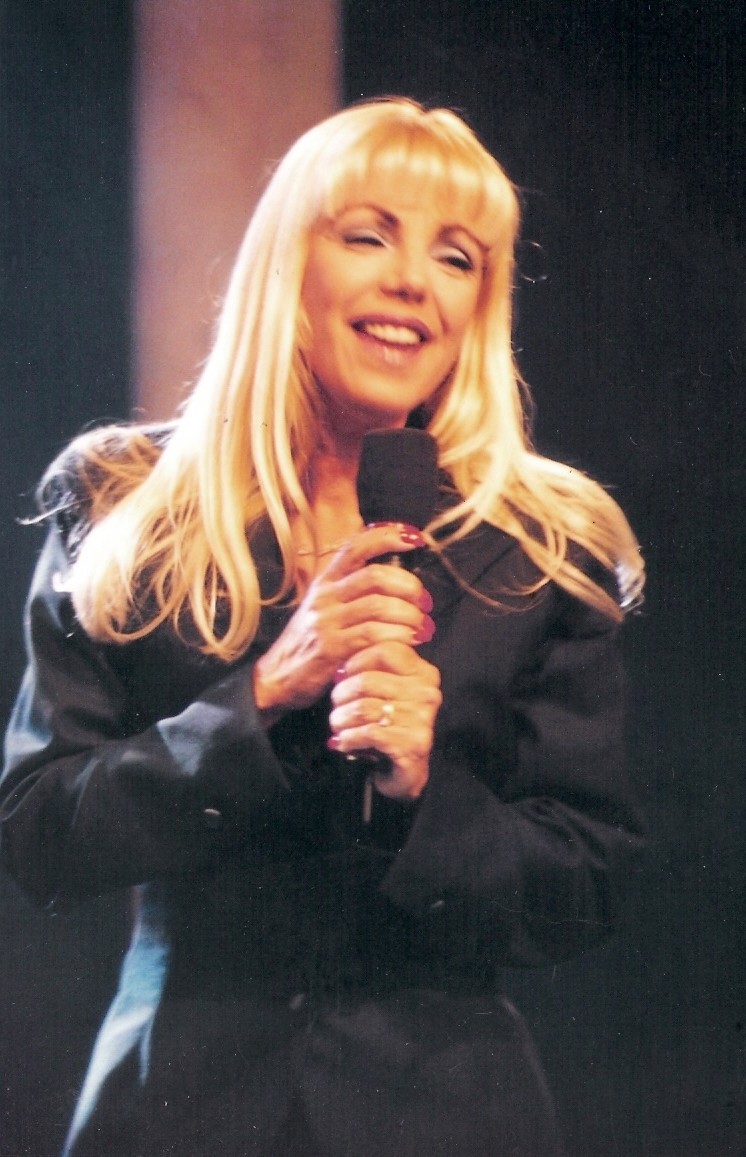
Dagmar Rivera

The following is a list of Puerto Rican comedians which includes comedians who were born in Puerto Rico, comedians who are of full or partial Puerto Rican ancestry, and many long-term residents or immigrants of other ethnic heritages who have made Puerto Rico their home and happen to be comedians as well.

== Comedians ==
- José Miguel Agrelot
- Raymond Arrieta
- Alba Raquel Barros
- Yoyo Boing
- Lou Briel
- Norma Candal
- Awilda Carbia
- Shorty Castro
- Melwin Cedeño
- Dagmar
- Lillian Hurst
- Juan Manuel Lebrón
- Machuchal
- Ángela Meyer
- René Monclova
- Luis Raúl
- Carmen Belen Richardson
- Ramón "Diplo" Rivero
- Luisito Vigoreaux
- Otilio Warrington

== See also ==
- List of Puerto Ricans
- List of comedians
