= Raquel Montero =

Argentine-Puerto Rican actress, comedian and show host

- Born: 1944; Buenos Aires, Argentina
- Occupation: Actress
- Years active: 1971–present
- Spouse: Tony Croatto (divorced)
- Children: 2 (Alejandro Croatto, Mara Croatto)

Raquel Montero (born 1944 in Buenos Aires, Argentina) is an Argentine-Puerto Rican television and theater actress, show host and comedian. She is better known for her extensive work on Puerto Rican television during the 1970s and 1980s, on canal 2 television shows.

== Early life ==
Montero was born in Buenos Aires, Argentina. As a young lady, she met and fell in love with Italian singer Tony Croatto. The pair soon got married and, in 1969, when Croatto and his sister Nelly Croatto (who formed a duo named Nelly y Tony) were contracted to perform at the Caribbean island-country of Puerto Rico, Croatto and Montero settled there, spending the rest of their respective lives in their second country.

== Acting career ==
Soon after moving to Puerto Rico, Montero befriended astrologer and former actor Walter Mercado, and, during a meeting between several friends that was held at Mercado's house, she began reciting stuff, an act that Mercado enjoyed very much, inviting her to his television show at the time.

In Puerto Rico, Montero first acted in a telenovela named Marcela y Marcelino, which was produced during 1971. Montero started appearing on other media, such as entertainment magazine covers, during that era. Also during the era, Montero gained steady work on Puerto Rican television. In 1978, she played "Condesa Italiana", an Italian Countess, in a telenovela adaptation of a book written by Puerto Rican writer Enrique Laguerre, named "Los Dedos De La Mano" ("Fingers of the Hands"), a role that she says is her favorite.

Late in the 1970s, producer Paquito Cordero was preparing a television comedy show which was called "Los Kakukomicos" ("The Kakufunnies", a name inspired by the sounds made when pronouncing, in Spanish, the identification letters assigned to Canal 2's station, WKAQ-TV). Montero was cast in this show to do a number of characters, and the show, which lasted from 1980 to 1990, helped her gain extra celebrity in her adopted home-country. Among the characters Montero played in that show were the Argentine "Tete" and the cheating wife "Tesoro", who was married to "Toribio Tauro", another popular character which was played by Puerto Rican actor Adrian Garcia. Her characterization of "Tesoro" was so popular on Puerto Rican television, that, for years, people on the streets recognized her as "Tesoro" and they sometimes even asked her about Adrian Garcia's whereabouts. Montero during the era also did commercials for a large Puerto Rican furniture stores chain named Mueblerias Mendoza; one of them alongside Yoyo Boing. According to Montero, who was known as "Ms. Mendoza" on those commercials, the company did not approve of her playing an unfaithful wife on television and her contract with the retailer was soon cancelled.

Montero also participated in a number of other shows during that time, including "Soltero y Sin Compromiso" ("Single and Unattached"), "Mi Hippie Me Encanta ("I Love my Hippie"), "Estudio Alegre" ("Happy Studio") "El Show de Las 12" ("The 12 P.M. Show") and the two Puerto Rican television classics, "La Pensión de Doña Tere" ("Ms. Tere's Hostel", where she shared credits with Puerto Rican actress Norma Candal and with former Menudo member Xavier Serbiá) and "En Casa de Juanma y Wiwi",("At Juanma and Wiwi's House") a Saturday nights comedy show where she participated along fellow "Kakukomicos" cast member Juan Manuel Lebron (who also shared sketch scenes with Montero at "Los Kakukomicos", as Montero's character "Tesoro"'s lover) and Awilda Carbia.

Montero was able to return to dramatic acting work and she worked at various telenovelas throughout the 1980s, including "Tanairi", "Cadenas de Amor" ("Love Chains") "Karina Montaner", "Andrea" and "Preciosa" ("Precious"). However, as work on Puerto Rican telenovelas dried out as Puerto Rican television stations gradually started phasing out local telenovela productions, Montero started looking elsewhere for work. In 1995, Montero went to Mexico, where she acted in a Televisa production named Morelia. Montero participated, as "Juliana", in this telenovela alongside her and Tony Croatto's daughter, the Venezuelan-Puerto Rican actress Mara Croatto, who had also acted with her before, at "La Pensión de Doña Tere".

Montero also dedicated herself to theater plays, including the play "Despedida de Una Soltera" ("One Bachelorette's Party"), in which she worked at the Centro de Bellas Artes in Santurce during 2011.

Montero is also involved in radio shows; she has been an actress on some shows broadcast by WIPR-FM, a Puerto Rican government radio station. Montero was involved in a controversy regarding the radio station's contracts with actors and writers during the late 2010s. She declared that since June 2018, neither she nor the rest of the actors (and writers) employed by WIPR had received any payments or job guarantees by the station amid station allegations that there was simply no money available to pay them, and that there was a law, which was established in 2011, that made the actors and writers entitled to a monetary reward. It was discovered, during a 2019 court hearing, that the station had been paid $800,000 US dollars by a Puerto Rican government agency so that the actors and writers could be paid for their work.

In 2018, Montero was reunited with Adrian Garcia and acted alongside Alexandra Fuentes and Dominican Republic-Puerto Rican singer and actress Charytin in a play named "Hijas de su Madre!" ("Daughter of your Mother", but in Spanish slang, the play's name translates better to "Daughter of a Bitch!").

Montero also acted in other theater plays, including "Divorcio, a lo Puertorriqueño" ("Divorce, Puerto Rican Style") and "Adorables Enemigas" ("Adorable Enemies").

In 2021, Montero had the chance of participating on a musical video, for a song by friend Alexandra Fuentes which is named "Pica Más" ("Bite More").

== Show host ==
Montero has also hosted several Puerto Rican television shows, including "Adelante, Juventud" ("Go Ahead, Youth"), "Fantastico" and Super Sabados.

== Personal life ==
Montero was married in her youth to Italian singer Tony Croatto; the couple divorced during the late 1970s. From this relationship, she had two children: son Alejandro Croatto was, like his mom, born in Argentina, while daughter Mara Croatto was born on 2 February 1969 in Venezuela.

Montero also has six grandchildren: Alejandro's kids Alex, José Rafael, Clara and Myriam Raquel, and Mara's sons Michael Gabriel and Juan Alejandro.

Through her daughter's marriage, Montero is the mother-in-law of the well known Mexican actor and evangelist, José Ángel Llamas.

== See also ==
- List of Argentines
- List of Puerto Ricans
- Claribel Medina - another Argentine-Puerto Rican actress
