= Los Kakukomicos =

Puerto Rican television comedy show

Los Kakukomicos was a Puerto Rican television comedy show which was produced by Paquito Cordero for Telemundo, channel 2. It was shown consecutively between 1980 and 1990.The show featured such stars as Lourdes Chacón, Otilio Warrington, the Argentine-Puerto Rican actress Raquel Montero, Rosita Velazquez, Juan Manuel Lebron, Waleska Seda, Tito Negrón, Shorty Castro, Adrian Garcia and others, as well as, before his death, Machuchal.

In 2011, the show was revived as a theatrical play, named "Los Kakukomicos, El Regreso" ("Los Kakukomicos, The Return").

The show is considered a comedy classic by Puerto Rican television viewers and critics alike.

== Toribio and Tesoro ==
Among the best known characters from the show were Adrian Garcia's "Toribio" and Raquel Montero's "Tesoro", who were husband and wife. Their sketch consisted of situations in which "Tesoro"always cheated on "Toribio" with a character played by Juan Manuel Lebron, without "Toribio" figuring it out.

== Cuca Gomez ==
Another popular character was female gossiper "Cuca Gomez", played by Otilio Warrington, who acted in drag for the role.
