= Myraida Chaves =

Puerto Rican show host, actress and television producer (1960–2021)

- Born: Myraida Chaves Carbia; March 12, 1960; San Juan, Puerto Rico
- Died: April 22, 2021 (aged 61); Caguas, Puerto Rico
- Occupations: Actress, show host, producer, news reporter
- Years active: 1983–2020s
- Children: Myriana Ortiz Chaves
- Mother: Awilda Carbia

Myraida Chaves Carbia (March 12, 1960 – April 22, 2021) was a Puerto Rican show host, actress and television and theater producer. Chaves was the daughter of the well-known Puerto Rican actress, Awilda Carbia.

== Early life ==
Chaves was the daughter of José R. Chaves and of Awilda Carbia, a Puerto Rican television actress. As a little girl, she attended Academia del Perpetuo Socorro in the San Juan area of Miramar (a subdivision of the San Juan suburb of Santurce).

During the early 1970s, at the age of ten, Chaves was given an opportunity to appear on Puerto Rican television for the first time, when she joined her mom in a show named La Hora de la Aventura (Time for Adventure), where she played her mom's character's (Estrella Galaxia) daughter, Estrellita. In that show, she also shared credits with Cary Oliver.

Chaves soon began acting in school and theater plays, such as Solo en Oscuridad (Only When Obscure), where she worked alongside the well-known Puerto Rican rock singer Orvil Miller, among others.

Chaves moved to Boston, Massachusetts, in the United States, to complete her education. She earned a bachelor's degree in communication from Boston University College of Communication in 1982.

== Show business career ==
Returning to Puerto Rico, Chaves was hired by Puerto Rican television's Channel 2, to host a show, alongside former Menudo member Rene Farrait, which was named Juventud '83 (Youth 83), a game show aimed at teenagers and college-aged young adults. Later, Fernando Sallaberry, another former member of Menudo, substituted Farrait as co-host of the show along with Chaves. By then, Chaves was becoming known in her native Puerto Rico, both as a budding television celebrity and as the daughter of Awilda Carbia. Juventud '83s name was changed to Juventud '84 in 1984. In 1985, Channel 2 decided, so that they would not have to change the show's name every year, to rename the show to Adelante Juventud, and Chaves was joined by Braulio Castillo Jr. as her new co-host.

Chaves tried her luck as a theatrical actress during 1984, participating in 40 Quilates (40 Carats), where she acted alongside her mom, Benito Mateo (who co-starred with her mom in a show named En Casa de Juanma y Wiwi), José Reymundi and Daniel Lugo, all of them experienced television actors. In 1985, Chaves acted in En Paños Menores (In Light Clothing), again with her mom and also with her television co-host Braulio Castillo Jr.

In 1986, Chaves became a television producer when Channel 11 of Puerto Rico hired her to produce their nightly edition of their television news show, Las Noticias (The News). She soon joined Las Noticias' on-camera staff as a news reporter herself. She also became a theatrical producer; one of her notable productions was named Desconcertados (Disconcerted, a play on the Spanish word for musical concerts, Concierto), in which her mom participated along with other well known Puerto Rican entertainers. Desconcertados was produced by Escarcha Inc., a company which was owned by Chaves and her siblings.

Chaves returned to Channel 2 in 1993, when she and Jennifer Wolff began hosting Estudio 2, which served as a bridge for Chaves to later on join Channel 2's news show, Telenoticias en Accion (Action News), once again, as a television reporter.

Around that era, Chaves became an activist and she was active on media campaigns such as the anti-drug campaign, Dile Que No a Las Drogas (Say No To Drugs). Chaves also recorded a number of infomercials. Around that era, she also recorded a video named Nueva Ola Portoricensis (Puerto Rican New Wave), and started presenting, on Puerto Rican television, a mini-show aimed at educating Puerto Ricans about the history of television, named 45 Años de Historia (45 Years of History), which was produced by Paquito Cordero. The latter show lasted until July 4, 1999, when a special transmission was televised.

Towards the turn of the century, Chaves moved to WIPR, where she became a radio show host, on a show named Hoy 940 (Today 940). She then joined WIPR's television arm, WIPR-TV, Channel 6, where, from March 12, 2002, she joined actress Linnette Torres on a program named En Tod@s (In Everything).

Myraida Chaves kept busy through the 2000s, her Channel 6 show, En Tod@s changing its name to Contigo (With You), with another Puerto Rican journalist, Isamari Castrodad, joining Chaves and Torres on-camera, while Chaves continued furthering her radio hosting career, on a show named Con El Pie Derecho (On The Right Side, literally translated to With the Right Foot) on a station named Magic 97.3, where she was, again, joined by Braulio Castillo Jr..

In 2014, Chaves began a show named Uno a Uno (One on One), which was shown on Channel 6. In this show, she became an interviewer and was able to interview several show business figures on national television. She also returned to theater as an actress, participating with Castillo Jr., Castillo's brother Jorge Castillo, Marisol Calero, Lizmarie Quintana and Cristina Soler in a play named Aqui No Hay Quien Viva! (This Place is Impossible to Inhabit!).

In 2017, Chaves was named director of the Centro de Bellas Artes Angel O. Berrios in Caguas, Puerto Rico. Her period as director of that center was challenging; six months after her appointment, the center was impacted by hurricanes Irma and María. Chaves quickly began rehabilitating the center and soon after, it reopened for theatrical productions.

== Health problems and death ==
Myraida Chaves was diagnosed with cancer late in her life. She received medical treatment both at Pavia and HIMA hospitals (the former in San Juan, the latter in Caguas), before dying on April 22, 2021.

Some 30 years before, Chaves had suffered from cervical cancer but at that time, she had recovered.

== Personal life ==
Unable to conceive her own children due to the cancer in her youth, Chaves had an adoptive daughter named Myriana Ortiz, who was born in 1994.

Chaves was divorced.

== See also ==
- List of Puerto Ricans
- Ivonne Class
