= Tito Lara =

Puerto Rican musician

- Born: Agustín Enrique Lara Olivencia; December 23, 1932; Río Piedras, Puerto Rico
- Died: 23 June 1987 (aged 54) Houston, Texas
- Genres: Bolero
- Occupation: Singer
- Instrument: Guitar

Tito Lara (December 23, 1932 – June 23, 1987) was a Puerto Rican musician. He was considered by many to be Puerto Rico's first television singing idol.

== Early years ==
Lara (birth name: Agustín Enrique Lara Olivencia) was born in Río Piedras, Puerto Rico. He was raised by his maternal grandmother and received primary education in Santurce. During his spare time, he taught himself to play the guitar. In 1942, when was only 10 years old, his grandmother realized that her grandson had musical talent and took him to WNEL, the local radio station, where he made his debut. In 1946, Lara enrolled at the Free School of Music in San Juan, where he continued his guitar studies and learned to play the trumpet.

== Trío Los Lirios ==
In 1948, Lara and eleven fellow students created an ensemble with Lara as lead singer. In 1949, Lara formed a trio called Trío Los Lirios which became a regular guest on the WKAQ radio station. They were paid 2 American dollars per appearance.

== Recording debut ==
Lara enrolled at the University of Puerto Rico to study Liberal Arts and joined the university's choir. In 1950, the owner of Mardí Records heard and was impressed by Lara's singing and asked him to form a quartet including a female voice. Lara did so, was signed by Mardí Records and dropped out of college in 1953 to travel with the quartet to New York City.

Lara also went solo in 1953 and scored a hit with a recording of the bolero Sollozo ('Crying'), which he followed up with Orquídeas, a Spanish version of Orchids in the Moonlight by Vincent Youmans. That same year he met and married Nilda María Canino with whom he was to have three children, Agustin Jr., María and José Rafael. He returned to New York and performed at the Paramount Theater where Myrta Silva introduced him as "El Pollo que Canta" ('The Handsome Singer').

== Los Hispanos ==
In 1955, Lara joined one of Puerto Rico's renowned quartets Los Hispanos and made his television début with them and singers, Ida Claudio, and Sonia Noemí on "El Show Ford", broadcast by Telemundo, the television station owned and operated by Ángel Ramos. His extraordinary vocal range allowed him to replace any of the members of Los Hispanos when one of them was unable to perform. On January 11, 1965, the group began a seven-year participation in the televised part of the Festival Sultana, a show produced by Paquito Cordero. Lara and Los Hispanos travelled and performed in the United States, the Dominican Republic, Panama, Peru, Venezuela and Chile. Lara enrolled in the Music Conservatory of Puerto Rico and in 1970 earned his bachelor's degree, specializing in trumpet-playing. He formed a duo with María Esther Ortiz called Los Dos and also founded the Allegro 72 group, which, among others, included Luis Antonio Cosme. Lara performed with Allegro 72 at Carnegie Hall, New York, and at various television stations. Some members of Allegro 72 who went on to gain fame were Lunna, Ángel "Cucco" Peña, Dagmar Rivera and Alyce Gracia.

== Later years ==
Lara began to have problems with his health in 1978, suffering a stroke which was complicated by his diabetes. In 1979, he underwent an open-heart surgery procedure from which he recuperated and shortly after returned to Puerto Rico. There he underwent conversion to Christianity and joined a Protestant church.

After his conversion, he continued singing sacred music almost exclusively, collaborating with singers such as the mezzo-soprano Maribel Soto, recording with her a Spanish adaptation of Sandi Patty's "More than Wonderful" ("Maravilloso es"); singing in a choir put together by Wisón Torres Jr. and Leyda E. Colón, founders and directors of the Puerto Rican Christian music group Peregrinos y Extranjeros, for the CD "Buscando aquella ciudad" ("Looking for that city") (Pilgrim Music), and recording two projects as a soloist. The first one was titled "Él" ("He"); the second one: "Señor Amigo" ("My Lord, my friend"). Most of the lyrics of his sacred songs talked about grace, eternal live, hope, and love for his Lord, Jesus Christ. When visiting churches to sing live or presenting concerts, he always said: "I sing happily because I believe in the words I sing". His version in Spanish of the Frankie Laine hit I Believe, titled "Tengo Fe", became his signature song.

He also participated in "Noche de Gala", a musical variety show hosted by T.V. personality Eddie Miró, for the celebration of Easter, singing the famous duet with Maribel Soto. In 1985, Lara participated in the Concierto de Navidad (Christmas Concert) held at the "Luis A. Ferré Center for the Performing Arts" in San Juan. In 1986, he held concerts in the Brooklyn Center for the Performing Arts and at the Hostos Center of Culture in the Bronx. That year he also recorded his last album, Los Cuatro Ases (The Four Aces).

== Personal life ==
Lara was married to Nilda Maria Canino from 1953 to his death. In addition to his wife, he was survived by his three children.

== Discography ==
External audio
- You may listen to Tito Lara's "Si Me Preguntan" on YouTube.

- Sollozo ('Crying') (1953)
- Orquídeas ('Orchids')
- Canciones de Los Cuatro Ases ('Song of the Four Aces')
- Lo que hay que hacer ('What You Must Do') (1958)
- No quiero ser tu amante ('I Do Not Want To Be Your Lover')
- Un nuevo ídolo para América ('A New Idol for America') (1959)
- Mi versión ('My Version')
- La vida mía ('My Life')
- Vivo sin ti ('I Live Without You')
- Imágenes
- Niebla de Riachuelo ('Bolero, Duet Album with Maria E. Ortiz')
- Tito Lara canta «Dos amores» (1962)
- Miedo ('Scared')
- Un poquito de tu amor ('A Little of your Love')
- Quisiera ('I Wish') (1966)
- Egoísmo
- Ansiedad ('Anxiety')
- En ruinas ('In Ruins')
- Allegro 72 (1973)
- El (He)
- Señor Amigo (My Lord, my friend)
- Los Cuatro Ases ('The Four Aces') (1986)

== Death ==
In March 1987, Lara suffered a heart attack and was hospitalized at the West Houston Medical Center in Houston, Texas. He died on June 23, 1987, aged 54, and was laid to rest in Santa María Magdalena de Pazzis Cemetery in Old San Juan.

== See also ==
- List of Puerto Ricans
