= Rolando Barral =

Cuban actor (1939-2002)

- Publicity Photo of Rolando Barral
- Born: 27 June 1939; Havana, Cuba
- Died: 21 January 2002 (aged 62); Miami, Florida, United States
- Occupations: Actor and television presenter
- Years active: 1950–1991
- Notable credit(s): Sábado Gigante (co-host; 1987)

Rolando Barral (27 June 1939 – 21 January 2002) was a Cuban actor, television presenter and radio host. He appeared in dozens of telenovelas and television series for more than 40 years. He was the host of the long-running talk show El Show de Rolando Barral, the first Spanish-language talk show in American television. He was often called "the Latino Johnny Carson".

== Career ==
Rolando Barral was born in Havana, Cuba, the son of Mario Barral, a screenwriter and television director on Cuba. Rolando began his career at age of 9 in a local radio program in Havana. In 1957 he became co-host of Partying with the Heartthrobs, a program which aired on CMQ for five years.

He was one of Cuba's leading radio and television presenters until he left the country in 1962. In 1962, Barral started his acting career, appearing in several telenovelas and films produced in through Spain, Panama, Puerto Rico, the Dominican Republic, Venezuela and El Salvador. He often played the role of a heart throb or romantic lead. Some of his most notable credits include Mi apellido es Valdez (1957), La otra mujer (1980), Toda una vida (1981) and Guaguasi (1983).

In 1978 Barral debuted as television host of long-running talk show El Show de Rolando Barral on WLTV Channel 23, then an affiliate of the Spanish International Network (the predecessor of Univision). In June 1985 the program briefly moved to competitor WSCV (then an independent station), before being lured back five months later.

During 1984, Barral was hired by Puerto Rico's channel 2 to co-host a show named Super Sabados, along with Rosita Velazquez and Luis Antonio Cosme. He lasted a few years at the show and was generally well liked in Puerto Rico.

Barral is perhaps best remembered as co-host of Spanish International Network's long-running variety show Sábado Gigante from January to March 1987, when he abruptly moved back to WSCV (which then became a Telemundo affiliate), where he hosted Super Sábado. In September 1987 he moved back to Channel 23, with Lunes y Viernes with Barral (Mondays and Fridays with Barral).

On January 22, 1988, Univision canceled the talk show following Barral's arrest by police in Coral Gables on cocaine possession and driving while intoxicated charges. He was fined $964 for the DWI conviction and given a one-year probation for the drug conviction. He returned to airwaves two months later as radio host of El Show on WSUA. Since then he was constantly active as host of TV with Barral on local cable station Hit TV.

Rolando Barral died on 21 January 2002 due to a stroke. He was buried at Graceland Memorial Park in Coral Gables, Florida.
