= Paquito Cordero =

Puerto Rican comedian and television producer (1932–2009)

- Born: Francisco Cordero Baez; October 16, 1932; Santurce, Puerto Rico
- Died: June 30, 2009 (aged 76); San Juan, Puerto Rico
- Occupations: Comedian and television producer
- Relatives: Mapy Cortés (aunt)

Paquito Cordero (October 16, 1932 – June 30, 2009) was a Puerto Rican comedian and music and television producer. He is considered a pioneer of Puerto Rican television.

== Early years ==
Cordero (birth name: Francisco Cordero Baez) was born to Francisco Cordero Paco and Berta Baez de Cordero in Santurce, Puerto Rico. Cordero attended Santurce Central High School upon finishing his primary and secondary education. He was a member of his high school's drama club and participated in its plays, where he discovered the art of comedy. Cordero was greatly influenced by his aunt on his father's side, Mapy Cortés. Mapy Cortés had moved to Mexico from Puerto Rico, where she became an actress. She married the Puerto Rican-born Mexican actor Fernando Cortés, a childhood friend. After Cordero graduated from high school, he enrolled and attended the University of Puerto Rico. At this institution, he first met Jacobo Morales. Cordero married his childhood sweetheart, a hairdresser whom everyone knew as "Cuqui". With Cuqui he had three children, two girls and one boy. Faced with both an upcoming child and the impending arrival of television, opted to drop out if his university career.

== Artistic career ==
Cordero auditioned for a role in a comedy skit which was transmitted through Radio El Mundo and was subsequently hired. He did this in his spare time. His aunt Mapy and her husband Fernando returned to the island and presented an idea for a comedy show to Ángel Ramos, owner of El Mundo Enterprises. During his time as a student, Cordero worked at WIAC, eventually being recruited by Tommy Muñiz to play a radio character after showing the producer an imitation of Ramón Rivero as Diplo, which became known as Reguerete (in an indirect reference to that actor) while auditioning for the titular role in Las adventuras de Andy Tenorio. During this period in his life, he fell in love with one of the show's dancers, a young girl by the name of Nora. He soon divorced his first wife and asked Nora to marry him. She accepted and together they had a son, Santiago.

On March 28, 1954, Puerto Rico received its first television transmission from Angel Ramos' WKAQ-TV Telemundo Channel 2. As the nephew of Mapy Cortés, wife of the station's administrator, Cordero was among the first radio personalities to debut in the new medium of television appearing the first day of transmission. Among the first comedy shows to go on the air was "Mapy Y Papi", where he appeared along his aunt, Fernando Cortés and María Judith Franco. The duo of Cordero and Rivera played the main comedy role in the tours that Producciones Tommy Muñiz organized throughout Puerto Rico. Due to this, they were teamed in Muñiz's first television show, A reírse con Ola. In La taberna India, Agrelot played don Elpidio and Cordero Reguerete. Cordero produced the third incarnation of La taberna India. Despite this, he had his office at Muñiz's base at La Casona.

In Hogar, dulce hogar Cordero played the role of Nicolás, a young neighbor who pestered the family of the protagonist. The characters of Elpidio and Reguerete migrated to Garata deportiva where they represented the Criollos de Caguas and Cangrejeros de Santurce, while Rivera defended the Senadores de San Juan and Miró the Indios de Mayagüez. With the end of the baseball season, the show was reworked into El chiste camel, with the cast remaining the same. By June 1960, Cordero opted to leave Producciones Tommy Muñiz and begin producing its own shows, creating a competition between both. He established his headquarters at First Federal building and kept the advertisement of Ford Motor Company and El show Ford with it.

== Paquito Cordero Productions ==
In the 1960s, Cordero formed his own production company which he named Paquito Cordero Productions, Inc. His younger sister, Bertita, became his assistant and eventually his younger brother, Jorge, would also join the company as a future co-producer. On January 11, 1965, Telemundo transmitted the first program produced by Paquito called El Show de las 12 (The 12 O'Clock Show). The first show included appearances by El Gran Combo, Tito Lara, Los Hispanos, and Olga y Tony. It also included a section within the show, dedicated to the teenage crowd, called "Canta la Juventud" (Youth Sings). Among those taking part in this section were Alfred D. Herger and Puerto Rican teen idols Lucecita Benítez and Chucho Avellanet. "El Show de Las 12" was presented by Miguel Ángel Álvarez and Eddie Miró was the scriptwriter. The show was a success and was watched by over 80 percent of the population, becoming one of Puerto Rico's most beloved programs for over 40 years.

The show was intended to compete with Muñiz's El show del mediodía, but an attempt to match it with comedy failed and instead led to its emphasis on music acts. Muñiz responded and both kept a direct competition for decades, where each would try to one-up the other by introducing new segments, each in direct response to the move of the other. An indirect result of this was the exposition of novel artists and groups to the audience, which served to establish a number of them as public figures.

== Television programs produced by Cordero ==
Cordero also produced the following shows which were popular in Puerto Rico:

- El Show de las 12 with "Los Alegres Tres", Silvia, Chapuseaux y Damiron with Clarissa, Militza (La India) and Mary Stull.
- "El Show Sultana", with "Los Hispanos", and Tito Lara
- "2 a Go Go", with Julio Angel & Tammy
- "Walter, las Estrellas Y Usted" (Walter, the Stars and You), with Walter Mercado
- "Mi Hippie Me Encanta" (I love my hippie) with Luis Antonio Rivera: Yoyo Boing, Rosita Velazquez, Johanna Ferrán, Raquel Montero and Myrna de Casenave
- "En Broma y en Serio" (Joking and Seriously), with Lou Briel, and Dagmar
- "Su Estrella Favorita" (Your Favorite Star)
- "El Show de Chucho", (Chucho's Show), with Chucho Avellanet"
- "En Casa de Juanma y Wiwi", (In Juanma & Wiwis' Home), with Awilda Carbia, and Juan Manuel Lebrón
- "Estudio Alegre & Musicomedia", (Cheerful Studio & Musicomedy), with Otilio Warrington, Awilda Carbia, Adrian Garcia and Juan Manuel Lebrón
- "La Gente Joven de Menudo/Menudomania", with Puerto Rican music group Menudo.
- "Los Kakucómicos", with Adalberto Rodriguez, Machuchal, and Shorty Castro, among many others
- "La Pensión de Doña Tere", (Lady Tere's Guesthouse), with Norma Candal, and
- "Noche de Gala", (Gala Night Ball), with Eddie Miró, and in different periods of time co-hosted by, Marisol Malaret, Deborah Carthy Deu, Marilyn Pupo and Gilda Haddock.
- "Wilson Wilson", with Wilson Torres, Alfonso Alemán and others.
- "Mi Familia", with Otilio Warrington, Judith Pizarro and others.
- "Xclusivo", with Kobbo Santarrosa and Eddie Miró.

On April 14, 1983, Telemundo was sold to John Blair and Co. and finally, in 2004 became part of the NBC Universal network. This led to many changes and one of the changes was the substitution of locally produced programs with programs produced in other countries such as Mexico. Cordero, however, remained at Telemundo as its main local producer from 1983 to 2004.

On May 6, 2004, television producers Paquito Cordero and Tommy Muñiz received a special recognition on behalf of the House of Representatives of Puerto Rico as part of the celebration of the 50 years of uninterrupted transmission on the Telemundo and Televicentro channels.

== Telemundo stops transmitting local programs ==
On February 25, 2005, Telemundo canceled Paquito Cordero's "El Show de las 12", the longest-running television show in Puerto Rico. Telemundo no longer transmits locally produced television programs and thus, is no longer a source of income to the local artistic class.

On the last airing of the show, Eddie Miró took the microphone and said these words:

Spanish (original version)	English translation
"Señoras y Señores..., "El Show de las 12" ha muerto". "Señoras y Señores..., reflexionemos ante su deceso".	"Ladies and Gentlemen..., "The 12 O'Clock Show" has died." "Ladies and Gentlemen..., a moment of silence for the deceased".

== Musical producer ==
At one point in his life, Cordero owned a music label, named Hit Parade. One of the acts that Cordero produced albums for was the well-known Merengue band, Conjunto Quisqueya.

== Later years ==
Disappointed at the status of the industry and the proliferation of lowbrow comedy, Muñiz entered a semi-retirement and spent most of his days at Culebra. Eventually, Rafo approached him about a return to theatre with a play named Los muchachos de la alegría, which was accepted and Morales was brought in to direct and as part of the cast. Agrelot was initially considered to lead the cast, but his issues with scripted work lead to the reconciliation of Muñiz and Cordero after two decades of estrangement. The play was a hit and moved from Bellas Artes to Teatro Tapia and then left San Juan to be shown at Mayagüez and Ponce, totaling over 30 shows. On February 3, 1997, he participated in Los 75 años de don Tommy, a special dedicated to Muñiz's career.

In 2007, Cordero, produced a remake of "Noche de Gala", (Gala Night Ball), broadcast by WIPR-TV, Tu Universo Television, channel 6, with Deborah Carthy Deu, as the host. Cordero died of respiratory problems in the morning hours of June 30, 2009. He is survived by his wife, Nora, and four children, Paquitin, Chiqui, Muñeca and Santiago. The governor of Puerto Rico, Luis Fortuño, declared three days of national mourning. On July 2, a wake was held in the "Salon de Actos" of El Convento Dominicos in Old San Juan which was assisted by the governor and his wife, local celebrities, and Cordero's family and close friends. Cordero remains were later transferred to the Santa Maria Magdalena de Pazzis Cemetery also in Old San Juan where he was buried.

== See also ==
- List of Puerto Ricans
