= Adrián García (actor) =

Puerto Rican actor and comedian

Adrian García
- Born: February 24, 1943 (age 82); Mayagüez, Puerto Rico
- Occupation(s): Dancer, actor, teacher
- Years active: 1957–present
- Spouse: Monica
- Children: 3

Victor Adrian Garcia Roche (born 24 February 1943) is a Puerto Rican television and film actor and comedian. He has worked on Puerto Rican television for decades, and has also participated in films such as 1976's La Pandilla en Apuros, a movie that also allowed Garcia to participate in his first musical album (albeit as an actor, as he appeared on a song where he voiced the character he played in the movie). By his own account, Garcia has participated in some 20 films.

== Biography ==
Garcia was born in the western Puerto Rico town of Mayagüez. Garcia has said that humor was in him since the day he was born. As a young child, Garcia lived in a wooden, two-story building where his house was on the second floor, and a mom-and-pop style supermarket (a "colmado" or "colmadito", in Puerto Rican slang) occupied the first floor. According to him, he was sent at a very young age to a social worker because he declared that he wanted to be "an actor or entertainer" and during that era, "most Puerto Rican parents said (their) children had to be doctors, fire (or) police (personnel), teachers, carpenters or plumbers". Since he was young, however, he showed artistic prowess, and he joined a musical group named The Rockers Boys, as a dancer, in 1957 at the age of 14. Garcia was encouraged in his pursuits by a teacher named Norberta Byron, who noticed his talent for acting. When Garcia was 15, he joined a radio show maintained by show host and teacher Pedro Ojeda on a radio station, WPRA. He acted, among others, in a play named "Muerte y Pasion de Jesucristo" ("Death and Passion of Jesus Christ") where the young man played a centurion who was in charge of whiplashing Jesus as Jesus walked to the Calvary Mountain. Garcia debuted in this particular role during holy week, 1958.

Adrian Garcia met Antonio Frontera, an acting teacher who taught at Manuel A. Barreto high school, which was near Garcia's high school (Garcia was studying at Eugenio Maria de Hostos High School at the time) during that era, and soon he went on to join Frontera's acting troupe.

It was while in this acting group that Garcia was discovered by Leopoldo Santiago Lavandero and by Francisco Arrivi Alegria, who were two popular theater figures from San Juan. Arrivi Alegria and Santiago Lavandero were so impressed by Garcia's acting that they returned to Mayagüez soon to see him act again, and, a short time later, invited him to go to San Juan with them. In San Juan, Garcia studied scenography, puppetry and diction, as well as acting and lighting techniques. Santiago Lavandero was a teacher at the University of Puerto Rico's Rio Piedras' branch's drama department, and Garcia soon enrolled at his class. Garcia at that time during the day participated on plays that were organized by Santiago Lavandero, while taking classes at night. While studying at UPR, Garcia also had the opportunity of meeting and studying under teacher Arthur Lessac. Garcia only lasted one school-year at UPR; he joined Canal 6's show "La Hora del Niño" ("Children's Hour"), which allowed him to make his television debut on Puerto Rico's government's television network. However, after Santiago Lavandero named him director of the "Mini-Teatro Escolar Poldín", Garcia met the famous Puerto Rican actress Norma Candal, who was by then being lured by Tommy Muñiz to join Muñiz on the television network that Muñiz worked for at the time, Canal 4. After Candal signed with Muñiz and Canal 4, Garcia joined his friend at that channel. Garcia's first job at Canal 4 was on a show named "Caras y Caretas de las Mujeres" ("Women's Faces and Disguises"). Garcia then had a chance to act in San Juan's legendary Teatro Tapia; he did so for the first time during 1969, when, aged 26, Garcia acted in a play named "Ay papá, pobre papá, en el Closet te Enganchó Mamá, y Qué Pena me Da" ("Oh Daddy, Poor Daddy, Mommy hanged you in the Closet and I Feel so Sorry for You!"), a play that allowed him to share scenes with actress Velda Gonzalez, among others. On this play, Garcia was directed by Xavier Cifre.

In 1970, Garcia's celebrity in Puerto Rico continued growing, when he joined the cast of a major Puerto Rican television hit of the time, named "Ja ja! Ji ji! Jo jo! Con Agrelot" ("Ja ja! Ji Ji! Jo jo With Agrelot") where he joined forces with legendary Puerto Rican comedian and actor Jose Miguel Agrelot. Agrelot during that time also participated in a television comedy segment named "Desafiando a los Genios" (which was shown on Canal 4's daily midday variety show, "Show del Mediodia"), where Agrelot played "Profesor Pulula". But, as Agrelot sometimes could not be present at the latter show, Garcia, to cover for him when Agrelot did not attend, created one of his most famous characters, that of "Pastor Menta" (which, when pronounced fast, as in "Pastormenta", sounded like "peace"-paz-and "storm"-tormenta). The "Pastor Menta" character proved so popular among audiences that Garcia played "Pastor Menta" on his feature film debut, 1976's teen musical comedy "La Pandilla en Apuros" (which gave him international exposure) and on the film's soundtrack album. Garcia, along with film producer Alfred D. Herger and with singer and actor Felito Félix, also contributed to the writing of that film's script. During the mid-1970s, Garcia moved channels again, to Canal 11, where he participated as a dramatic actor in a telenovela named "La Historia de Laura Benson" ("Laura Benson's Story"), in which Garcia had the opportunity of working alongside Miguel Angel Suarez, among others. However, Garcia did not stay at Canal 11 too long, as, lured by producer Paquito Cordero, he once again moved, this time to Canal 2, where, beginning in 1980, he played another one of his most iconic roles, that of cuckold "Toribio Tauro", a man whose wife "Tesoro" (played by Argentine-Puerto Rican actress Raquel Montero) cheated on with another character, which was played by Juan Manuel Lebron, on the hit Telemundo comedy show "Los Kakukómicos" (which loosely translates to "The WKAQ-funnies", WKAQ-TV being Canal 2's signal on Puerto Rican television) At "Los Kakukómicos", Garcia also played another famous character, female "Solitaria", alongside Puerto Rican actress Waleska Seda, who played "Solitaria"s sister "Soledad", on a sketch about two single women who could not get anyone to date them. "Los Kakukómicos" lasted ten years on Puerto Rican television; Garcia worked there from 1980 to 1984.

Garcia also found work at two other Canal 2 shows, "Musicomedia" and "El Show de Las 12" ("The 12 P.M. Show"). At "El Show de Las 12", Garcia worked until 2005, when the show was cancelled. He then returned to Canal 11, where he joined fellow Puerto Rican actor Wilson Torres during 2006, on a show named "Que Suerte!" ("How About My Luck!"), which was hosted by Hector Marcano.

Also in 2006, Garcia began teaching acting in a school named Ateneo Puertorriqueño. Garcia is the owner, also, of a company named "Humor Dinamic".

== Selected filmography ==
- La Pandilla en Apuros (1976)
- Sunstorm (1999)
- Poking the Eye of the Storm (2000)
- Santa Cristal (2001)
- Cayo (2005)
- Mal de Amores (2006)

== Personal life ==
Garcia and his wife had three children, whom have given them five grandchildren.

== See also ==
- List of Puerto Ricans
