= Juan Manuel Lebrón =

Puerto Rican actor and comedian (born 1947)

- Born: Juan Manuel Lebrón Román; April 22, 1947 (age 79); San Juan, Puerto Rico
- Occupations: Actor, singer, comedian

Juan Manuel Lebrón Román (born April 22, 1947) is a Puerto Rican actor, comedian, model, screenwriter, television producer and salsa singer.

== Career ==
Juan Manuel Lebrón began his show business career as a youngster, then when he became a singer at the Sexteto Ritmico group. Not long after, Lebrón became the lead singer of Orquesta Sensacional, a popular salsa orchestra of the era. Lebrón began his comedy career in Tommy Muñiz's Desafiando a los Genios. For two months, he had traveled to WAPA-TV requesting a job, in the process displaying his routine. Eventually, while José Miguel Agrelot was absent, Shorty Castro suggested that they use Lebrón as a replacement. He appeared as Pululita Verdejo in the nighttime slot, winning the favor of Tommy Muñiz with his performance.

In 1976, Lebrón made his debut as an actor, when he was hired to play "JuanMa" in channel 2's comedy show, "En Casa de JuanMa y Wiwi" ("At JuanMa and Wiwi's Home"). Lebron acted alongside Awilda Carbia, who played "JuanMa"'s wife "Wiwi". The pair became one of Puerto Rico's most popular television couples in history, and their show lasted fourteen years on Puerto Rican television. In 1978, Lebrón was recognized with the Diplo comedian of the year award, an award given to Puerto Rican comedy actors. By 1980, he had been recognized by the Puerto Rican Junior Commerce Chamber as one of the "top ten Puerto Rican youngsters".

Having already participated in his first album (as a member of Orquesta Sensacional), Lebron in 1982 released a single. "Amores sin Sentido" ("Pointless Loves"), which became a chart topper in Puerto Rico. By then, he formed part, alongside Lourdes Chacon, Otilio Warrington, Shorty Castro and Adrián García, among others, of another comedy show, "Los Kakukomicos" ("The Telemundo Comedians"). In "Los Kakukomicos", Lebrón formed part of a mock music group that satirized Menudo, a well known boy band of the era. He and Warrington also became popular as a comic duo as time went by.

Lebrón represented Puerto Rico at the OTI Festival 1985, with the song "Represento", a major hit song that was written by Lou Briel.

In 1986, Lebrón was awarded the "Buho de Oro" trophy in Panama as a popular entertainer in that Central American country, where he earned a golden album that same year, for the sales produced by his album, "Represento".

During the 1980s also, Lebron was a popular talk show visitor, being invited to many of Puerto Rico's talk shows on multiple occasions. In 1990, production of "En Casa de JuanMa y Wiwi" ceased, and Lebrón released another album, "El Primero" ("The First One"), of which one single, "Ella y Tu" ("You and Her"), earned Lebron a nomination for salsa singer of the year at the Premios Lo Nuestro awards. The album reached number-one on the Billboard Tropical Albums chart.

By 1992, Lebrón was chosen by channel 2 as their spokesman for the yearlong celebrations of the quincentennial of the discovery of the Americas by Cristobal Colon. He represented Puerto Rico at the Expo '92, which was held that year in Sevilla, Spain.

Lebron in 1993 received the Paoli award as Puerto Rican salsa singer of the year. He has released a total of nine albums or CD's; these include dedications to Nat King Cole and Tito Rodriguez and a production, "Una Obra de Amor" ("An Act of Love"), which was later re-edited and dedicated to children with HIV.

In 1995, Lebrón made his Hollywood debut in "Assassins", with Sylvester Stallone and Antonio Banderas. "Assassins" remains as Lebrón's only Hollywood movie. On February 3, 1997, he participated in Los 75 años de don Tommy, a special dedicated to Muñiz's career.

Juan Manuel Lebrón Román and Junior Abrahms, a former sportscaster turned actor and show host, are in charge of hosting a game show named "Atrevete" ("Dare"). Nevertheless, he has dabbed in on Telemundo Puerto Rico's main rival, WAPA-TV, making sporadic appearances at WAPA shows, usually when friends of his work at a particular WAPA show. He also acted in "Los Seijo-Dones" ("The Seijo-Dones Family") and "Anda Pa'l Cara" (which loosely translates to "Holy Cow!").

Lebrón has also collaborated on many television commercials, for companies such as AT&T, Eastern Air Lines, Gulf Oil and Church's fried chicken, among others.

Juan Manuel Lebrón Román has also acted on theater plays. In 2005, he participated in his third film, (along with Conexion Caribe and Assassins) Puerto Rican production "El Vacilon: The Movie" ("Goofing Off: The Movie").

== See also ==
- List of Puerto Ricans
