= Super Sábados =

Variety show of Telemundo Puerto Rico

Super Sábados (Super Saturdays) is a game and variety show which aired on Telemundo Puerto Rico from 1984 to 1991. From 1987 to 1989, it was also broadcast by the Telemundo network in the United States. In many cities, it competed with the Univision game show "Sabado Gigante".

The program was created by the Argentine father-and-son producers Oscar and Carlos Sacco. This show was five hours and was on every Saturday night. It held first place in ratings for many years. It had many hosts through the years like Johanna Rosaly, Luis Antonio Cosme, Dagmar Rivera, Rosita Velazquez, Eddie Miró, Rolando Barral and sometimes Otilio Warrington, who was also known as Bizcocho.
