= Claribel Medina =

Puerto Rican actress

- Born: December 16, 1961 (age 64); San Juan, Puerto Rico
- Occupation: actress
- Years active: 1984 ─ present
- Spouse: Pablo Alarcón (m. 1989; div. 1995)

Claribel Medina (born December 16, 1961, in San Juan) is a Puerto Rican actress who has acted for soap operas and movies filmed both in her native Puerto Rico and in Argentina.

== Biography ==
Claribel started her artistic career in the early 1980s when an opera singer, Alex Vázquez, chose her to have a role in the musical production "The passion and death of Our Lord Jesus Christ". She studied in the Department of Drama at the University of Puerto Rico.

== See also ==
- List of Puerto Ricans
- Raquel Montero
