= Awilda Carbia =

Puerto Rican actress and comedian (1938–2009)

- Born: January 30, 1938; San Juan, Puerto Rico
- Died: March 22, 2009 (aged 71) San Juan, Puerto Rico
- Genres: Comedy
- Occupations: Actress, comedian, impersonator, television personality
- Instruments: Voice and facial gestures
- Years active: 1940s–2009

Awilda "Wiwi" Carbia (January 30, 1938 – March 22, 2009) was a Puerto Rican actress, comedian, and impersonator. Carbia served as a comedian and participated as a script writer for some of Producciones Tommy Muñiz's comedys. She also appeared as a regular in Ja-ja, ji-ji, jo-jo con Agrelot. As the 1970s came about, there was an actors' strike in WAPA-TV, and the whole cast of comedians of Tommy Muñiz Productions, to which Awilda belonged, created a new company, called ASTRA.

== Early years ==
Awilda Carbia started her acting career by appearing in television at the age of three. In the 1970s, she hosted the children's television show, Estrella Galaxia (Galaxy Star), broadcast by WAPA-TV. Later, she left the show, and her daughter, Puerto Rican television host Myraida Chaves (1960-2021), took over, playing "Estrellita Galaxia" ("Little Galaxy Star").

== 1960s ==
During the 1960s, Carbia performed as a comedian in several television shows, such as Rendezvous Nocturno, produced by Cuban television producer Tony Chiroldes, and El Show del Mediodía (The Mid-day Show), produced by Puerto Rican producer Tommy Muñiz. Later, she became part of the cast of television sitcoms in WAPA-TV in Puerto Rico, such as Ja, ja, ji, ji, jo, jo, (Ha, ha, he, he, ho, ho), with Puerto Rican comedian José Miguel Agrelot, "Don Cholito".

== 1970s-1980s ==
In 1972, making a short turnabout in her career as a comedian, Carbia became the leading lady of the soap opera telenovela broadcast by WAPA-TV El Silencio Nos Condena (Our Silence Condemns Us), opposite Cuban leading man Eliseo Pereira. Actor José Reymundí began a strike against Producciones Tommy Muñiz in 1973, in particular against its administrator Hérnan Nigaglioni, claiming that he had been left out of a local production to favor foreigners. Soon afterwards, he was joined by more people as APATE joined and people like Castro decided not to cross the protest lines, while others like Candal actively joined the protests. Morales in turn decided to quit on the air.

Only Alida Arizmendi challenged the protests. WAPA-TV decided not to intervene and distanced itself from the issue. In the end, Muñiz granted the demands of the protestors, such as health coverage or six month contracts, but Reymundí was unable to benefit due to the cancellation of the production due to the strike. Producciones Tommy Muñiz was affected by it, with only productions like Esto no tiene nombre or Ja-ja, ji-ji, jo-jo con Agrelot surviving. Candal, Morales, Warrington, Carbia, Molina and García left to create Producciones Astra and joined Channel 7. Together, they produced a different television comedy series called Ahí Va Eso (There it Goes), which was telecast by Rikavision, channel 7, then WRIK-TV. This would only last for some years, since the company gained a reputation as supporting work syndicates and were avoided.

Later Carbia moved to Telemundo and became the leading lady of her own television show inside the legendary music and comedy series that aired for 40 consecutive years, El Show de las 12, (The 12 o'clock show). She was also featured in two comedy series: La Encubierta Descubierta (The Uncovered Undercover Agent) and Awilda lo Divierte (Awilda Entertains You), as well as being a member of the comedy cast for El Show de Chucho (Chucho's Show). The latter was the #1 television show for many years.

Later, when Chucho Avellanet abandoned the show, Carbia, alongside Otilio Warrington (Bizcocho) and Juan Manuel Lebrón, took over the show. From being the stars of the comedy cast, they became the stars of the show, then called Estudio Alegre (Cheerful Studio) and later, Musicomedia (Musicomedy). She also starred opposite Juan Manuel Lebrón, Benito Mateo and Rosita Velázquez in the hit Sunday prime-time TV sitcom En Casa de Juanma y Wiwi (At Juanma and Wiwi's House). She also starred in the celebrated Puerto Rican Spanish-language production of 40 Carats (40 Kilates), co-starring her own daughter Myraida Chavez.

Carbia starred in a new concept series of a one-woman comedy act, titled Desconcierto. (In the Spanish language this means "confusion", "disquiet" or "disorder"; however, in the context of the show, the word is playfully used as the antonym of the word "concert", to mean "un-concert"). She impersonated Puerto Rican celebrities such as Myrta Silva, Carmita Jiménez, Lucecita Benítez, Yolandita Monge, and Nydia Caro, among many others. Carbia's series of Desconciertos made their debut at the Tapia Theater in San Juan, and were performed in various theaters and night clubs of Puerto Rico such as the Caribe Hilton Hotel, the Centro de Bellas Artes Luis A. Ferré in Santurce and, most notably, 105 performances at the legendary Tapia Theater in Old San Juan. Desconcierto kept running on stage for 15 consecutive years, in two-month seasons. During one of the seasons Desconcierto was on, she was joined onstage by singer Edgardo Huertas.

In the late 1980s, Carbia signed an exclusivity contract with WLII-TV, TeleOnce, and produced her own weekly comedy series: Soy Awilda (I'm Awilda, once again,, alongside Edgardo Huertas). It aired for three consecutive years.

Later, Carbia accepted an offer from actress and producer Lucy Boscana, to perform opposite her in a leading role in a dramatic television mini-series. It was filmed between Argentina and Puerto Rico, and was titled Cita en Buenos Aires (A Date in Buenos Aires).

== 1990s - 2003 ==
On stage, Carbia has performed as the leading lady in many "zarzuelas" (Spanish operettas), comedies and musicals. She starred as Miss Adelaide in the 1991 Puerto Rican revival of Guys & Dolls, opposite Ivan Rodríguez as Nathan Detroit, Osvaldo Ríos as Sky Masterson, and Cristina Arzuaga as Sarah Brown. The English-language production played at the Luis A. Ferré Performing Arts Center in San Juan.

Carbia also joined her daughter Myraida Chavez in an original theater production staged throughout various locations around the island, called Dos Mujeres de mi Tierra (Two Women of My Land), acknowledging the poetry of Julia de Burgos and the music of Sylvia Rexach.

In 1998, she performed the multiple leading roles of the Puerto Rican comedy play Lo Mejor está por Venir (The Best is Yet to Come), portraying three different women characters.

Al derecho y al revés (Noises Off), Salvemos los delfines (Let's Save the Dolphins), Cosas de papi y mami (Daddy & Mommy's Ways), Teatruras de gala (Gala Ball of Theatrical Things), Morisquetas, (Grimaces) and Nacionalmente correcta ("Nationally Correct") were among the theater productions in which Carbia performed as the leading lady.

In 1999 she returned to television, through Telemundo, Channel 2, starring in a new sitcom called Los Seijo Díaz (The Seijo Diaz family), again opposite Juan Manuel Lebrón. It aired through 2003.

== Later years ==
In 2005, she had a leading role in the Puerto Rican film El Sueño del Regreso (The Dream of the Return) produced and directed by Puerto Rican director Luis Molina Casanova. She also portrayed Helen Keller onstage in a dramatic stage production at the Raúl Juliá Theater in Santurce.

In 2007, she starred in the Puerto Rican musical Fuego a la Lata (At Full Blast) at the Angel O. Berríos Performing Arts Center in Caguas, Puerto Rico.

Carbia made a guest appearance on the daily television talk show Contigo (With You) broadcast by Tu Universo Television, WIPR-TV, where the leading host was her daughter, Myraida Chaves, actress, producer and television host, and director of the Centro de Bellas Artes de Caguas. In addition to Carbia's guest appearances, she hosted her own daily talk show on radio station 940-AM.

On October 28, 2008, she was honored by San Juan Mayor Jorge Santini during the gala held to reopen the Tapia Theater in Old San Juan, which included a star-studded concert with, among others, Danny Rivera and Andy Montañez. Carbia, who was ill, was accompanied by all her children, as well as celebrities such as astrologer Walter Mercado. The next day, Santini honored her by dedicating the Awilda Carbia Theater Café.

Carbia died on March 22, 2009, aged 71, of pneumonia at Presbyterian Hospital in San Juan, Puerto Rico.

== See also ==
- List of Puerto Ricans
- List of notable residents of San Juan, Puerto Rico
- Paquito Cordero
- History of women in Puerto Rico
