= WIPR =

WIPR may refer to:

- Puerto Rico Public Broadcasting Corporation, including:
  - WIPR (AM), a radio station (940 AM) licensed to San Juan, Puerto Rico
  - WIPR-FM, a radio station (91.3 FM) licensed to San Juan, Puerto Rico
  - WIPR-TV, a television station (channel 6) licensed to San Juan, Puerto Rico
- The World Intellectual Property Report, a biennial analytical publication by WIPO
- World Intellectual Property Review, a bimonthly magazine providing news and analysis on issues in intellectual property
- West of India Portuguese Railway Company, a former railway company in what is now India
