= Lourdes Chacón =

Puerto Rican actress, singer and dancer

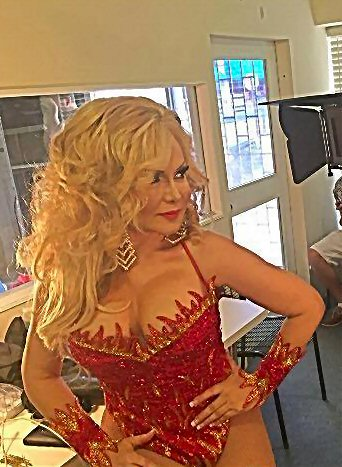
- Lourdes Chacón in 2017
- Born: Lourdes María Chacón Rodríguez; February 14, 1958 (age 68); Cayey, Puerto Rico
- Occupations: Actress singer vedette
- Years active: 1980s–present
- Height: 5 ft 4 in (163 cm)
- Children: Chaliana Batista Chacón; Alfredo Batista Chacón
- Parent(s): Don Angel Manuel Chacón; Carmen Rodriguez Ortiz
- Relatives: Ileana Chacon Rodriguez; Miguel A Chacon Rodriguez

Lourdes Chacón (born February 14, 1958) is a Puerto Rican actress, dancer, and singer.

== Biography ==
Lourdes enjoyed huge popularity and media exposure during the 1980s and 1990s in the island of Puerto Rico. She was also popular in Mexico, where she was baptized under the name of "Piel de Fuego" (Skin on Fire). She is well known for her exotic dance performances and songs encompassing "El Ritmo, Fuego y Sabor" (Rhythm, Fire, and Flavor). She shares her surname with her half-sister Iris Chacón who is also a vedette.

== Early life ==
Born of parents Don Angel Manuel Chacón Alonso and Mother Carmen Rodriguez Ortiz in Cayey, Puerto Rico, raised in Chicago, IL, and by her late teens returned to reside in Barrio Maricao de Vega Alta, PR.

== Career ==
She became an internationally known artist in the 1980s. She was discovered and hired by the late Paquito Cordero, of (Paquito Cordero Productions, Inc), which aired local programs and Puerto Rican TV productions via Telemundo.

In the 80s she made weekly appearances in a musical comedy show called "The Kakukomicos". While filming that show, she was given the opportunity to showcase her voice in song. "Suavecito" was her first song on television. The song was written by the Puerto Rican salsero, Felito Felix. And even though the song was never put on an LP record. It was successful in the promoting Lourdes and helped in her artist development. Eventually she a recorded her "self" titled LP vinyl record and Another hit song was born called, " El Pescaito" (The Little Fish).

2017 Lourdes is still active vedette; acting, dancing and singing. In 2018, she performed at Noches de Cabaret (transl. Cabaret nights) at a club in Santurce, Puerto Rico.

== Personal life ==
Lourdes retired in early 90s, she married Alfredo Batista on July 27, 1994, she has two children. She made a few acting roles and theater appearances during those years. On May 1, 2010 she divorced due to irreconcilable differences.

In 2018, she made a comeback as a full time vedette and was dating trumpet player, Ismael Rosario.

== Discography ==
- Lourdes Chacón LP Recording (1983)
- Felicidades CD Recording (1993)

== Filmography ==
- Mili (Telenovela) (1984)
- La 1 a.m (movie) (2010)

== Theatre ==
- Cena de Matrimonios (1984)
- Mi Marido está Embarazado (Venezuela Production) (1991)
- Baño de Damas (1995)
- Que Bonito Luce todo en la Navidad (1997)
- Mujeres de Blanco (1999)
- La Nena tiene Tumbao (2005)
- El Regreso de Los Kakukomicos (2012)

== Television ==
- Los Kakukomicos 1980– 1990
