= Luis Antonio Rivera =

Puerto Rican actor (1930–2023)

- Born: April 9, 1930; Humacao, Puerto Rico
- Died: November 30, 2023 (aged 93); Hato Rey, Puerto Rico
- Other names: Yoyo Boing
- Occupations: Actor; comedian; host
- Years active: 1940–2023

Luis Antonio Rivera (April 9, 1930 – November 30, 2023), also known as "Yoyo Boing", was a Puerto Rican actor, comedian and television show host, who was also one of the pioneers of Puerto Rican television.

== Early years ==
Rivera Benítez was born in Humacao, Puerto Rico on April 9, 1930 to Juan Antonio Rivera and Josefa Benítez Ortíz. His parents moved to Santurce, where he spent his childhood and adolescence, from Humacao when he was only three years old. After receiving his primary education, Rivera attended the "Escuela Superior Central de Santurce" (Central High School of Santurce). He found a part-time job at a local radio station which opened the doors to a new world for him.

Rivera became a member of the Drama Department of the University of Puerto Rico. As a drama student, he participated in two of René Marqués' plays. Having a deep baritone voice he also became a radio presenter. His radio station dramatized comedy sketches, and one of the producers suggested dramatizing Archie Comics over the radio. Due to the lack of audiovisual references for the characters at the time, there were no clear cut ways of representing the characters in Spanish, nor there were exact translations for their names. Rivera came up with the name of Yoyo Boing for representing Jughead; the name "Yoyo" sounded close to "Jughead", and the "Boing" part was a gimmick Rivera developed for the character: a vocalized "boing" that he constantly repeated to fill in silence gaps during each episode. Ever since his Archie stint on Puerto Rican radio, Puerto Ricans rarely refer to Rivera using his real name, and usually refer to him by his by-now "nickname".

== Pioneer in Puerto Rican television ==
1954 was the year that television was born in Puerto Rico. Rivera, together with Tommy Muñiz, José Miguel Agrelot and Paquito Cordero was one of the first comedians in Puerto Rican television. Muñiz was responsible for transforming Rivera, who had so far been a dramatic actor and master of ceremonies, into an announcer and comedian. To create Yoyo Boing's image Muñiz took him to a department store and bought several ridiculous-looking pieces, which were combined with other appearance quirks. The characters of Elpidio and Reguerete migrated to Garata deportiva where they represented the Criollos de Caguas and Cangrejeros de Santurce, while Rivera defended the Senadores de San Juan and Miró the Indios de Mayagüez. With the end of the baseball season, the show was reworked into El chiste camel, with the cast remaining the same.

In 1960, he starred alongside Norma Candal (Petunia) in a television comedy called "La Críada Malcríada" (The Rude Maid). In the 1970s, Rivera starred in own sit-com called "Mi Hippie Me Encanta" (I'm Crazy about My Hippie) broadcast by Telemundo. In the 1980s, Rivera starred in the situation comedies, "Generaciones", (Generations), with Chayanne, "Los Suegros" (The In-Laws) and later in a spin-off of that show called "Los Suegros y Los Nietos" (The In-Laws and the Grandchildren), broadcast by WAPA-TV. Rivera was also the General Manager of radio stations WKBM-AM ("AM 81") and WORO-FM ("Radio Oro", or Golden Radio), the radio branches of the Roman Catholic Archdiocese of San Juan.

Various media producers arranged for many Puerto Rican performers to tour New York City in the late 1950s and early 1960s. Rivera was one of these. As fate would have it, one particularly chilly evening Rivera and Bobby Capó were exiting a performance outside the Teatro Puerto Rico and were looking for a place to eat. While waiting for public transportation, Rivera told Bobby Capó two jokes. These two jokes, reinterpreted by Capó and set to music, became two major musical hits: "El Negro Bembón", for Rafael Cortijo and his Combo (sung by Ismael Rivera), and "El Caballo Pelotero", a smash hit for El Gran Combo de Puerto Rico (original version sung by Pellín Rodríguez).

For years, Rivera co-hosted "El Show del Mediodía", a midday variety show, on WAPA-TV alongside Luis Vigoreaux. After Vigoreaux was murdered early in 1983, Rivera became the show's main host, position in which he performed for several years afterwards.

== Later years and Death ==
In the 1990s, Rivera wrote a book titled "A Reír Con Yoyo" (Let's Laugh with Yoyo) and donated all of the proceeds to an AIDS organization. He was also active in a television show called "Desde Mi Pueblo" ("From My Town") for WIPR-TV (San Juan's channel 6), where he would visit every town and city and show all of the interesting aspects of the featured place. His co-hosts on the program were Deborah Carthy-Deu, Maria Falcon and Tony Croatto. For the 40th anniversary of Puerto Rican television, TeleOnce aired a special titled 40 Kilates de Televisión produced by Rafo Muñiz in which he made an appearance.

After José Miguel Agrelot's sudden death in 2004, the remaining co-hosts on Agrelot's long-running radio show "Tu Alegre Despertar", (Your Cheerful Wake-Up), Aurora Previdi and María Falcón, asked the radio audience to select a permanent replacement for Agrelot from a round of temporary co-hosts. Rivera won the assignment; given the wishes of Agrelot's family to achieve some closure, the program changed its name to "Contigo en el tapón" ("Along With You In The Traffic Jam") and changed its format slightly. Rivera remained as a popular co-host, filling Agrelot's considerably large shoes. He also hosted a daily program of Puerto Rican music classics at Allegro WIPR-FM.

Puerto Rican writer Giannina Braschi wrote a performance novel using the Yoyo Boing nickname as a title with some punctuation added: "Yo-Yo Boing!". Featuring a tinted photo of Rivera with superimposed X-ray specs for the book's jacket, the comic bilingual novel has very little to do with Rivera himself, but does feature a dream sequence inspired by childhood memories of the roles he played.

By the 2000s, Rivera was retired from television but making special appearances. He was the protagonist of the locally produced movie for television "Santa Clos es Boricua" (Santa Claus is Puerto Rican) which was telecast in Puerto Rico and the United States through Televicentro on December 20, 2004. Since the early 2010s Rivera, who celebrated his 90th birthday on April 9, 2020, was the host and producer of the popular radio talk show Tus Compañeros Del Tapón, a daily afternoon program on 940AM, WIPR (AM).

In 2020, Rivera suffered a stroke. A successful fundraiser was organized by a local journalist to provide Rivera with a power wheelchair lift. He died from heart disease at the Hospital del Maestro in Hato Rey, Puerto Rico on November 30, 2023, at the age of 93.

== See also ==
- List of Puerto Ricans
- Giannina Braschi, author of Yo-Yo Boing!, the novel.
