= Shorty Castro =

Puerto Rican comedian and actor (1928–2018)

- Born: Israel Castro Vélez; January 28, 1928; Mayagüez, Puerto Rico
- Died: January 22, 2018 (aged 89); Altamonte Springs, Florida
- Occupation: Comedian
- Children: 2

Israel Castro Vélez, better known as Shorty Castro (January 28, 1928 – January 22, 2018) was a Puerto Rican comedian, actor, comedy writer, stage director, radio host, singer, dancer, composer and musician, with a career spanning over 60 years. During his youth, Castro spent time working with several orquestas in the west coast of Puerto Rico. Early in his life, Castro was a singer in William Manzano's orchestra, performing throughout Puerto Rico in casinos, Fiestas Patronales and other venues. He continued working with other orchestras and in theatre with Gilbert Mamery. He was singing at the Baños de Coamo when he was first seen by Muñiz. Castro asked Muñiz for a chance, but it took a year for him to be cast in Hogar dulce hogar. From there, he was included in Colegio de la Alegría. During the 1960s, comedian Castro would occasionally mimic the look of the current Miss Universe in his cross dressing character of "Ramoneta Cienfuegos de la O", making appearances in the second version of Desafiando a los Genios. With the makeup and wigs being prepared by Carmen Andino and Carmen Ayala of WAPA-TV. He also used the characters of Armando Galán y Figura and Don Bernabé as alternates. Castro would make annual trips to cities like New York, Chicago, New Jersey, Connecticut, Washington D.C. and Philadelphia, where he performed his comedy acts.

== Entertainment career ==
=== Early career ===
Castro had a blind aunt that lived at Ponce and played the guitar, whom she would join in playing the maracas. While attending school at Mayagüez he created and directed his own music groups. He developed the skills necessary to become an entertainer: good singing voice, talent as a percussionist, and good timing for comedy. As a conga player, Castro considered himself competent enough to have been a full time musician had fate been different. While working full-time as a messenger for the municipality of Mayagüez, Castro held odd jobs in numerous local orchestras, mostly as a singer and percussionist. These orchestras included William Manzano's and Carlos López's (for both, Mon Rivera had also been a singer and percussionist), Mingo and his Whoopee Kids; Charlie Miró y sus Pájaros Locos; and San Germán's Happy Hills' Orchestra.

One of these orchestras performed a gig at the Baños de Coamo, where producer Tommy Muñiz took notice of Castro's performance. After meeting him, Muñiz asked Castro to perform in La Taberna India, Muñiz's best rated television show, alongside Rafael Cortijo's band. Castro then returned to Mayagüez to prepare for his move to San Juan, which was supposed to occur on August 24, 1956, when he took a public bus halfway across the island. At a road stop in Quebradillas, however, Castro learned about the sudden death of Ramón Ortiz del Rivero (Diplo), Puerto Rico's most popular comedian at the time. With the country in mourning, Castro was forced to return to Mayagüez and wait one week for his television debut, on August 31. He played congas and sang a few of Mon Rivera's plenas with the Cortijo band that day. He later became a stagehand (first) and musical bit player within the program. While appearing at Taberna India, Castro began as a singer until the producer identified his comedic potential. Muñiz put him in trial roles to confirm this hunch, before completing the transition full time. When his contracts ran out, Castro returned to singing, and made a second tour of New York with the Happy Hills' Orchestra.

Muñiz and other producers regularly staged shows with Puerto Rican talent at the Puerto Rico Theater near Spanish Harlem, in New York City. Asked to return to Puerto Rico by Muñiz, Castro left his orchestra and started playing regular comedy roles in Tommy Muñiz's productions such as "Hogar, Dulce Hogar" where he played Napoleoncito, the romantic interest of María Antonieta, a maid played by Carmen Belén Richardson. He later played a similar role, "Medio Metro", along Velda González's Azucena in La Criada Malcriada, first on television, later on film. He and José Miguel Agrelot worked together in many comedy television programs and live appearances. Their professional relationship and friendship lasted over 40 years.

During the summer of 1957, Castro joined Jacobo Morales, Vale Cuatro, Marta Romero and Charlie Miró in a musical radio comedy that aired through WKAQ. This group also hosted other activities together, such as dances. On October 7, 1957, the show Telefiesta De La Tarde debuted on television with an act by El Combo de Shorty Castro. In April 1959, the Fiesta Club contracted him to sign in their Secretaries Week event. That month he also performed in a homage for boxer Francisco Colón García organized by the Administración de Parquee y Recreo Públicos at Parque Sixto Escobar. Castro participated in a New Year's party in 1960, becoming the last colleague to see singer Osvaldo Seda alive since he died shortly afterwards. In August, Hotel La Campana contracted El Combo de Shorty Castro to play in a dance along Pedro Altieri y su Banda de Acero, Los Alegres del Ritmo, Davilita, Felipe Rodríguez and Los Antares.

=== Teaming with Agrelot ===
As they became established, Castro would join other figures such as José Miguel Agrelot, Cristobal Berrios, Googie Santana and Vicentico Morales in a variety of public appearances and shows. Castro and Agrelot would also perform at local businesses, such as Supermercado Alonso. The La Rue Cocktail Lounge also contracted him as its master of ceremonies, promoting him as El Eterno Teenager (lit. "the Eternal Teenager"). Castro also performed as part of the Teatro Lírico organized at WAPA-TV to include a variety of local and international acts.

In 1963, Castro made appearances at New York that were well received. At Puerto Rico, he joined Muñiz in a cooperative act held at Supermercado Hermanas Dávila. In December 1963, he appeared in Telemundo's Christmas special Estampa Navideña along Agrelot, Ulises Brenes, Emma Rosa Vicenti, Jacobo Morales, Víctor Arrillaga and other artists. The Puerto Rico Police contracted him to perform in the presentation of the bureau's new PR official, Pedro L. Moczó, appearing along fellow conedian Cristóbal Berríos. During spring 1964, he was also contracted by the Saigon Night Club at Bayamón. In May 1964, Castro joined over fifty other artists in an event to raise funds for the Asociación Pro Rehabilitación de Adictos (APRA) held at Sixto Escobar Stadium and transmitted by WIAC and Radio Voz. At La Rue he joined Chaguín García and Combo Ponceño. Castro joined the cast of Gran Show del Mediodía, directed by Nino Costa and performing along Tommy Muñiz, José Miguel Agrelot, Emma Rosa Vicenty, Jacobo Morales, Velda González and Camilo Fraticelli, among others. He also joined his Grupo San Juan along José Luis Moneró and Agrelot on recurrent appearances in El Show de Harry Rexach. The cast of the show also appeared in an event where Rexach gave medals to amateur baseball players. On October 23, 1965, Castro and the Combo, Fraticelli and Lily Pagán headlined the Fiestas Patronales at Ciales. Castro and Agrelot also participated in other events, such as inauguration acts.

He continued being a fixture of El Show de Harry Rexach, touring various municipalities like Caguas, Fajardo and Levittown besides its usual base at San Juan. When the Club Caborrojeño held a homage for Muñiz, Castro was among those in attendance. Castro rejoined Agrelot in an event held by the Exchange Club to entertain the patients of the Asilo de Ancianos nursing home. Castro was also part of the cast for the show Johnny El Men. During the summer, Castro and his Combo joined Agrelot, Muñiz, Fraticelli, Celines, Pepe Luis in a show to entertain the Puerto Rico national guard troops during its annual exercises. The cast of El Show de Harry Rexach also held special editions for the delegations of other countries that arrived to compete in the 1966 Central American and Caribbean Games and a separate homage to local figures in charge of organizing the event at Hiram Bithorn Stadium. Castro and Sexteto San Juan were contracted by the Marimonte Tourist Inn Hotel and Restaurant at Río Grande to host a dance along Domingo Patterson and his Orquestra.

Castro appeared in a film adaptation of La criada malcriada that released in local cinemas late in 1966, starring along González, Morales, Agrelot, Yoyo Boing and Muñiz. His music group was contracted by the Young & Rubicam company to provide the entertainment in their executives party. Meanwhile, he and the Sexteto continued making appearances in several venues. Castro was given the role of Tito in the military comedy El special de Corona. He was one of several script writers and performers for the sketch show Esto no tiene nombre, which required several hours of writing per episode since it aired over a hundred different jokes per hour. His character of Ángelo became popular with the segment. In December 1967, Castro as Ramonieta Cienfuego joined Agrelot as Profesor Pulula and Morales as Mantenedor for a special edition of Desafiando a los genios held at the Hiram Bithorn Stadium by the Senadores de San Juan of the Professional Baseball League. In early 1968, Paquito Cordero took him along Lucecita Benítez, Julio Ángel, Velda González, Felipe Rodríguez, Yayi & Elisa and Los Rebeldes on a tour of 46 shows throughout the United States. Upon returning, the Happy Boys Club of Mayagüez held an event in his honor that included a parade and concluded with the reward of a plaque at the municipal Town Hall and a show with the other artists that had participated in the tour. He endorsed journalist Jorge Font Saldaña in his bid to become mayor of San Juan. Castro also became affiliated to the Federación de Músicos de Puerto Rico, a labor union representing artists. He also made non-television appearances sponsored by Produciones Tommy Muñiz. In November 1968, Castro attended the premiere of La criada malcriada and Agente Cero at the Mayan Theater in Los Angeles, California.

=== Peak of popularity ===
In January 1969, he received the Agueybaná de Oro award for "Best Male Comedian" during the Codazos festival. As was the case with most of Produciones Tommy Muñiz's artists, Castro dedicated part of his free time to contribute and participate in charity events. In January 1969, Castro served as master of ceremonies in a Three Kings Day event at the Liga París in Mayagüez.

When Rafi Nieves was honored by the Town and Country night club, Castro was among those invited. Castro reunited with Agrelot and Morales in an event hosted by Esso Standard Oil Co. for Puerto Rican distributors. When Damián Rosa launched his own production house at New York, he was recruited along several other Puerto Rican comedians, many from Muniz's lineup. During this time, Castro became a recurring act Thursdays at El Colubrí Cocktail Louge Night Club. In June 1969, he received a homage at the Festival de Prensa, Radio y Televisión del Área Oeste. Castro next appeared in Guanica's Fiestas Patronales. In July 1969, Castro participated in an event to raise funds for Hogar Crea. Castro, Agrelot, Evelyn Souffront, Herminio Quintana, Morales and Los Hispanos, among others in El Show Corona hosted by Cervecería Corona. He was among several comedians that participated in an activity in support of the Puerto Rico Children's Hospital. Castro was also contracted to serve as the master of ceremonies at the Granada Lounge at Bayamón. In September 1969, the Club Caborrojeño organized a homage to Castro which was attended by several of his peers.

In December 1969, he won another Agueybaná de Oro at the Festival Codazos. Castro joined Cooperativa Nacional de Artes Teatrales’ (COOP-Arte) Festival de Artistas at Country Club. In February 1970, he reunited with Agrelot and performed along more than 40 artists for the to raise funds for the Children's Hopital. They joined Morales in a pep rally at RUM as part of the LAI. He served as a cheer leader of sorts for the campus, which won the event. The Hipocampo Night Club also contracted him as master of ceremonies.

At the Festival de Teatro Internacional, Castro joined Jardiel Poncela's comedy Tú y yo somos tres as "Gumersindo", starring along Lillian Hurst, Adrián García, Frank Moro and Aristeo Rivera Zayas. Critic Norma Valle noted that while his own presence was able to gather a reaction due to his popularity but his acting could have been better since he basically performed as "Shorty" and an enunciation issue was weighting down the performance. Other media critics considered that he met his expectations and "resulted a distinct and refreshing note in the theatrical environment". Despite the mixed reception, Castro himself was happy with his debut. He continued active in television, also appearing in the show Encabulla vuelve y tira. During the summer of 1970, Castro received an homage at the Iguazú night club.

He participated in a homage for Emilio Capacetti organized by the Asociación Puertorriqueña de Aficionados de la Música Antigua. He also performed the symbolic pitch to open the Liga París at Mayagüez. In August, Castro received a plaque from the municipality of Mayagüez as a longstanding positive representative of the town. In November 1970, he attended the premier of the local film Arocho y Clemente directed by Miguel Ángel Álvarez. That month, Castro also sang in homage for the historic players of the Indios de Mayagüez sponsored by La Casa Mayagüezana and held before a game at Hiram Birthorn Stadium. During the winter, he challenged two time-winner Agrelot and won the Caballero de la Televisión award at Festival Codazos. Castro tied with Agrelot and Antonio Rivera for the Agueybaná de Oro at Festival Codazos. When the Indios celebrated their day on December 27, 1970, Castro raced Canena Márquez betting the role of Armando Galán against his opponent's coaching job for a day. In January 1971, La Rue held a homage for him. The following month Castro participated in a radio-marathon to raise funds for a children's hospital at Guaynabo. He continued working at the Hipocampo Night Club, where every Thursday was a "Shorty Castro Night".

Entering the 1970s, Castro was appearing in La criada malcriada, La Comedia Histórica, Esto no tiene nombre and Desafiando a los genios. In March 1971, los Genios presented their show at the annual assembly of CAAM alumni. Castro joined Velda González's Producciones Velda starring in the comedy play ¿Será virgen mi marido? where he starred along her and Daniel Lugo with a cast that also included Lillian Hurst and Alicia Moreda. In April 1971, he was featured in Bohemia magazine. During this time, Castro also joined Orquesta Hermanos López and performed in night clubs. In May 1971, he was part of a lineup that included several artists in the television special El Súper Estelar de Bacardí. By the summer reports stated circulating that Castro wasn't satisfied with his role in Producciones Tommy Muñiz and had begun considering alternatives. Castro returned to the Mayagüez's LAI pep rally, gifting a plush of university mascot to rector José E. Arrarás. He joined Manuel de Sabatini and the crew of Produciones Velda in Tres Álcobas which was presented at Teatro Cervantes. In May 1971, Castro participated in a television special that celebrated 450 years since the founding of San Juan, where he sang plena and played the battery. During the summer, he joined a march organized by Phi Delta Gamma from Río Piedras to Old San Juan to raise funds for muscular dystrophy research and treatment, receiving the fraternity's insignia as a prize. He also appeared in an event held by the Popular Democratic Party (PPD) at Cervecería Criolla in Carolina. In July, Castro was invited to throw the first pitch in the first game of the baseball Liga Central, where Mayagüez played as the home team. In August 1971, he performed at a PPD event at Hacienda Campestre Río Lajas at Toa Alta.

In August, he handed an award plaque to José Luis Mirabal, a young artist also known as Joselito, inn event held at the Hipocampo. On August 21, 1971, Castro was part of a homage given to Miguel Pérez, a professional wrestler that won the world tag team championship along Antonino Rocca and never lost it, held at the Hiram Bithorn Stadium. In December 1971, Castro was nominated to defend his Caballero Televisión at Festival Codazos. In the event, he also wrestled Bizcocho in a match without referee.

However, he won the Agueybaná de Oro for "Most Versatile Actor" instead. During the Professional Baseball League All-Star break, Castro (third base), Agrelot (hoke plate), Jacobo Morales (first base) and Adrián García (second base) worked as umpires of the All Timers game. In January 1972, he supported Myrta Silva when she lost her mother. In June 1974, Castro participated in a welcoming to Jerry Lewis, who landed in Puerto Rico to sign an agreement to air his tele-marathon. Afterwards, he toured New York wuth his comedy acts. In December 1973, Castro announced that he was returning to music with the release of the LP El Shorty que usted no conoce, which featured salsa and romantic songs. He also introduced a musical show to his television repertoire and designed a hotel show titled Puerto Rico In and Out. In December 1973, Castro repeated the Agueybaná de Oro as Versatile Actor of the Year at Festival Codazos.

He and Agrelot were contracted by the Industriales to provide the entertainment in their 1974 annual convention held at Hotel Cerromar. DUringbthe winter, Castro participated in the Caravana de Estrellas 1974 at the Juan Ramón Loubriel Stadium to raise funds for the Children's Hospital. In February 1975, Castro participated in the Festival de la Canción Mayagüezana at the Coliseo Colegial, which gathered more than a dozen artists from the municipality and was sponsored by local organizations. In April 1975, Castro served as master of ceremonies in the Juventud de Acción Católica de Puerto Rico's Festival de Música Coral Pro Central de Juventudes, a choral music celebration. During the winter, he participated in a Christmas concert to raise funds for the Children's Hospital at Bayamón. In August 1976, Castro participated in a PPD show at Hotel San Juan along Agrelot, Yolandita Monge, Conjunto Típico and Los Jíbaros de Pellín. He also joined singer Mauro and Oscar Galende in WIPR-TV's Música en Dos Tiempos. In November 1976, Castro joined several dozen artists in a homage held for perennial arts sponsor Rafael Quiñones Vidal at the Roberto Clemente Coliseum. In March 1977, Castro returned to the Festival de Música Mayagüezana held at the Centro Cultural. This was followed by another CAAM pep rally where he was joined by the other Genios. In April, Castro and Agrelot appeared at a Danny Rivera concert at Guayama. During the summer, he received a homage from the Gallera Coliseo de Trujillo Alto. He joined the Variety Club of Puerto Rico in their march to raise funds for children hospitals at San Juan. Castro participated in the Festival de la Juventud at Parque Luis Muñoz Rivera. In July 1977, he was featured as part of the lineup of the Festival Músico-Cultural at Plaza de la Convalescencia in Río Piedras. Castro was also part of the Municipality of San Juan's youth-oriented Navidad en Julio event. Beginning in November 1977, Castro wrote the jokes for WIPR's La hora del niño starring ventriloquist Kobbo Santarrosa.

In February 1978, Castro returned to his third consecutive Concierto Música Mayagüezana. In May 1978, he served as the master of ceremonies in a Larry Harlow concert. He was also along other Puerto Rican artists that joined their Cuban counterparts at the Hiram Bithorn Stadium. During the summer, Castro participated in a musical sports event at Miramar. When Telecádena Pérez Pérry secured a contract with Tommy Muñiz, he was among several artists that joined him. Castro was also a presenter for the Los Reyes de la Salsa concert at the Roberto Clemente Coliseum. He was also featured when Telemundo transmitted a "Cuban night" special. During the winter, Castro was the mysterious pitcher brought by the Indios to one of its games.

When the 1979 Pan American Games were held at San Juan, Castro was part of the entertainment program as part of a comedy night. In an interview in Alfred D. Herger's Cambia, Cambia on WLII-DT, he noted that wanted to star in a telenovela, produce a show whose concept he had designed back when he was in WAPA-TV and revisited an old goal of producing a feature film based on a Féliz Castero script. In March 1979, he was invited to El Súper Show Goya as an invited comedian. During the summer, Castro participated in a televised special for raise funds for the Sociedad de Niños y Adultos Lisiados held at Hato Rey. He also made appearances at the Show de Judy Gordon and the Show de Shows as a robot in the skit "Familia Futura del año 2000". Castro was featured in the lineup of the Hacia Nuevos Horizontes television special to raise funds for the SNALPR. In October, he was contracted to appear in a political television marathon for the New Progressive Party (PNP) along several artists. The following month, Castro participated in a homage to Quique Rodríguez held at the Sixto Escobar Stadium. In January 1981, Castro served as the master of ceremonies in an event held at Safari Park. He repeated this role in an event to raise funds for the local baseball little leagues at Guaynabo. Castro reunited with Agrelot by serving as the master of ceremonies in a fund raiser for the Boy Scouts. Castro was contracted as master of ceremonies for Isla Verde Holiday Inn's Week of the Secretary dance show at the Salón Cacique dance room. He was a guest in a Wilkins concert held at Caguas on Mother's Day. In August 1981, Castro joined a homage for Rosita Velázquez held at Ocho Puertas in Old San Juan.

=== Working with Cordero and Vigoreaux ===
In February 13, 1982, Castro joined the rest of the Kakucómicos in a Valentine's Day event at Guayanilla. The following week, he played the Rey Momo at the Carnaval Juan Ponce de León at San Juan. In August 27, 1982, he was part of a homage for actor Héctor Agosto. In January 1983, Castro received a plaque from the municipality of Mayagüez during the Festival de Reyes. When El Show de las 12 first debuted, he was part of the original cast. During the summer, Castro also collaborated with Ilano Tourists in a Father's Day show at the Coamo hot springs. During the winter, he performed at the Retorno a Barcelona event at Mayagüez. During the autumn, he made his return to radio in Tempranito en la Mañana along Cristóbal Berríos on WXTO-AM. He continued active within WKAQ-TV, besides his recurrent roles in Los Kakucómicos and Operacion ja, ja he also appeared in other shows such as Súper Sábado. In August 1985, Castro returned to theater once again playing the porter in Tú y yo somos tres at Teatro Tapia. His performance, however, was considered as exaggerated by media critic Ramón Figueroa Chapel, who disliked all aspects of the play.

In March 1986, Castro joined Otilio Warrington in a comedy show at Hacienda Paola in Río Grande. He continued active in with television appearances in shows such as Kakukómicos, Buenas tardes and the Festival Infantil Navideño. Outside of these, Castro would also make independent appearances in a variety of locations. In May 1987, he participated in a homage to Agrelot at Festival de Arte El Cemí. When Cervecería India celebrated its 50th anniversary, they recognized several figures including Castro in an event held at Teatro Yagüez. During the summer, he made an appearance at the Festival de Agua Dulce at Ciales. When Eddie Miró celebrated 35 years of career with a dance, Castro was among the invited guests. The Hotel & Casino La Ceiba at Río Grande contracted him as master of ceremonies in February 1988. That same month, Castro was interviewed by Pedro Zervigón and Elsa Fernández Miralles in Fuera de serie, with the topic being crossdressing in Puerto Rico. He was contracted as presenter of a television-marathon to raise funds for Ciudad Deportiva Roberto Clemente held at the Roberto Clemente Coliseum. During this time, Castro began considering retirement from television.

In November he was a guest at WAPA-TV's ¿En Serio?… Con Silverio. Shortly afterwards, it was officially announced that Castro had been contracted by Luis Vigoreaux Jr. to join that station. He commented that his choice to leave Producciones Cordero were not due to money, but because he felt that there were more opportunities going forward at WAPA-TV. He then participated in a homage for Segio Negrón at the Pachín Vicens Coliseum at Ponce. At WAPA-TV Castro rejoined Agrelot and Sunshine Logroño at Eso que estamos buscando. He also participated in Vigoreaux's Entrando por la cocina and the play adaptation, Entrando por la Cocina: El Musical. The Sands Hotel and Casino contracted Castro to be the ceremony master at their Noche de San Juan event starring Los Rayos Gamma. He hosted Máxima 940 am radio show "Shorty Castro a las 11", on weekday noons, together with long-time friend and fellow comedian Tito Negrón. After this show ended suddenly, Shorty stayed unemployed for a while until he started hosting "Shortyoganes", a new show in the same radio station and at the same daytime, along with his old friend Oswaldo Oganes. This show also ended quickly. He later hosted a third show, "Nuestras Raíces", again with Tito Negrón, on weekday mornings. On February 3, 1997, he participated in Los 75 años de don Tommy, a special dedicated to Muñiz's career.

== Personal life ==
Castro is from Barrio París at Mayagüez, in the west coast of Puerto Rico. His parents were Juan Castro Ayala and Victoria Vélez Cuevas and he was the second and oldest male child of twelve siblings. One of Castro's most obvious characteristics was his short stature, which gives him his nickname, but he would often joke about it and answer questions about why he would stand on the tip of his feet by saying that he was "trying to catch a glimpse up front". Despite being occasionally billed at 4'11", Castro admitted that he measured 4'10" and that this created some shame before he overcame it thanks to Muñiz. During his youth, Castro worked in a laundry as a messenger, where he met baseball player Artie Wilson, who would bestow upon him the nickname of "Shorty" when picking up his uniform. Among his siblings Tinín and David were short as well, with Nelly being the tallest. During this stage of his life, Castro also worked at the Teatro Puerto Rico as an attendant.

He considered that his body allowed few options to work in life, choosing what he considered the hardest aspect of comedy, to make people laugh. When asked why he enjoyed comedy, he answered that "as long as there is laughter there happiness, and where there is happiness, hate doesn't exist." Castro himself grew to enjoy all types of comedy, creating an affinity with improv due to the challenge it presented. Outside the camera, Castro was a fairly introverted and serious man that didn't enjoy being interviewed. He had a son, Israel Vicente, and a daughter, María Vitoria, with his wife María Elena Balines. His schedule only allowed him to sleep 3–5 hours and limited his family time to mostly Sundays. According to Luis Vigoreaux Jr., Castro wasn't a particularly good cook. He was involved in lobbying for the celebration of the Primera Diáspora Afro-Boricua, an event celebrating Afro-Puerto Ricans.

His yearly tour included Chicago, Indiana, Philadelphia, Washington, Connecticut and New Jersey, besides New York. Castro received offers to tape a show and distribute it throughout Latin America. Despite his frequent tours abroad, Castro suffered from aerophobia. Among his group of friends, there was also singer Rafael José and lawyer David Urbina, with whom he shared a short stature. Castro was in multiple automobile accidents, being involved in a serious one on Mother's Day in 1974 where his red Corvette was totaled. In Easter 1975, Castro was involved in a crash with his Pontiac vehicle where he suffered some mouth injuries that kept him at home in Santa Juanita, Bayamón for some time.

=== Support for syndication ===
Castro considered the artist's life difficult, noting that they should be paid more instead of having to work on several projects at once, fully supporting the creation of a syndicate. He favored artists that he considered overcame the odds in life, such as Luis Vigoreaux Jr., Sammy Davis Jr. and Liza Minnelli. Castro supported the creation of the Administración para el Fomento de las Artes y la Cultura to support the arts and the permanence of the Institute of Puerto Rican Culture (ICP), signing a public letter to pressure the government. When the Asociación Puertorriqueña de Artistas y Técnicos de Espectáculo (APATE) approved a boycott of Dominican artists from local media due to a political incident, Castro was among the artists that supported their permanence. This attempt to distance the arts from politics and keep neutral was criticized, with the argument that politics and economy are as pervasive in them. In 1961, a picket line was established in front of Teatro Tapia when a performers union wasn't recognized, the Puerto Rico Police was called in and arrested several artists including Castro. Despite supporting syndicalism, Castro was unsatisfied with how APATE operated and publicly stated that if it disappeared, then maybe another union could do things better.

Actor José Reymundí began a strike against Producciones Tommy Muñiz in 1973, in particular against its administrator Hérnan Nigaglioni, claiming that he had been left out of a local production to favor foreigners. Soon afterwards, he was joined by more people as APATE joined and artists like Castro decided not to cross the protest lines, while others like Candal actively joined the protests. Morales in turn decided to quit on the air. Only Alida Arizmendi challenged the protests. WAPA-TV decided not to intervene and distanced itself from the issue. In the end, Muñiz granted the demands of the protestors, such as health coverage or six month contracts, but Reymundí was unable to benefit following the cancellation of the production due to the strike.

=== Ties to Mayagüez ===
In 1971, a women's softball league was created at Mayagüez and was baptized Doña Vito, in honor of his mother. Castro aided the Sociedad Mayaguezana Protectora de Animales by participating in the Show de Perros Satos, a dog show that also included free vaccination. The following year, he revisited the Sato Show at Mayagüez. In 1978, the municipality of Mayagüez acquired the house where he was born at Barrio París with the intent of creating a school for comedians.

=== Involvement with sports ===
Castro was a lifelong fan of the Indios de Mayagüez and publicly rooted for the team. Likewise, when a group of citizens from Mayagüez gathered together in a bid to buy the Indios of the Professional Baseball League, he was named to be part of the Comité Timón Pro Mantener Franquicia de Béisbol Profesional en la Sultana del Oeste along Carlos García Méndez, Amadeo Nazario Janer, Carlos J. Bacó, Rafael Comas, Efraín Diodonet, Benito Ortiz, René Ramos Muñoz, Alvaro Cifuentes, Abel Pabón, Fernando del Toro, Juan Hernández Batalla, Danilo Eboli, Manuel Pirayo and its president José Charana. In April 1969, the committee held an event at Mayagüez to push for the permanence of the franchise that included the participation of Castro as an artist. During the autumn of 1981, he joined several artists to play against the Rho Delta Omicron fraternity in a softball game at Patillas. Castro also played with the traveling Artist Team against teams representing local businesses like Matis Pizza Burgers and Amarkis Meat Products with some success. In 1987, Castro also joined an artist's basketball team to play against retired players. In August 1984, Castro joined Pasando el Balón, an event supporting continued sports sovereignty for Puerto Rico that was held at Caguas.

== Composing and screen writing ==
Two of Castro's plenas are particularly better known. Pa' los caborrojeños is an ode to the people of Cabo Rojo, Puerto Rico, written to coincide with his stints as a singer and percussionist in one of the town's local orchestras, that of Roberto Ortiz. On the other hand, the novelty song Por dos pulgadas ("By two inches") was a sleeper hit for fellow comedian Juan Manuel Lebrón during Puerto Rico's 1997 Christmas season which became a #1 hit on the Billboard Latin Tropical Airplay chart. During a six month stay at New York in 1958, Castro recorded Pa' Dulces Labios and Pa' los Caborrojeños. As a composer, Castro wrote the song Raíces which Celia Cruz recorded in an LP.

As a writer, Castro would write the comedy script two blocks away from the radio station and would occasionally send a messenger with the finished pages before sending the complete piece. In an edition of El Show de las 12 Castro and Luis Antonio Rivera gave Waleska Seda her first opportunity to appear in a comedy segment. Likewise, he also gave a young Mara Croatto Montiel her first media appearance in Show de Shows.

Most of his characters were based on someone he had met or a trope. Angelo, the angel is mischievous and ingenious and was created by Muñiz, born during a reunion where Morales also participated while writing an episode of Esto no tiene nombre. Armando Galán is modelled after the typical town dandy and given that name due to being common in telenovelas, with Castro believing that his popularity is based on how common the trope is in real life. "Camillita" was created as an innate drunk in order to facilitate funny and unexpected situations. "El Conde de París" was designed to be the anthesis of all his other characters, allowing Castro to do the opposite. Castro has noted that all other characters were created on the flight, in order to cover an immediate necessity. Medio Metro to have another half for Azucena, Panchita Zapata when there was a necessity to replace Antonio Rivera in El Colegio de la Alegría, "El Gemelo del Oeste" to pair with his brother, "Cabo Alejo" to fill a slot left by Agrelot, "Che Pibe" to have an Argentine character, "Don Goyito Buenahora" to have a community authority figure and "Ramoneta Cienfuegos de la O" to have a comedic feminine character. In 1970 he introduced Mohamed Castro to the lineup of characters.

Castro expressed that writing was the hardest part of his entertainment career, but he collected more than 5,000 joke books to use as references when writingJa, Ji Ji, Jo Jo, Esto no tiene nombre and Desafiando a los genios. During the 1970s, Castro noted that he believed that the latter was his favorite show, but Esto no tiene nombre was best designed to showcase his skills. When the 10th grade class of Escuela Superior Margarita Janer at Guaynabo decided to homage Desafiando a los Genios in their biology class, Castro himself wrote them seven jokes referencing the nervous system and visited the school. By the late 1980s, Castro had phased Ramoneta out of his habitual routine, but brought it back when he joined Vigoreaux. When asked, he noted that Ramoneta had been retired because internal rules at WAPA-TV had banned crossdressing characters. Castro also helped Efraín López Neris with the Teatro Comunal Rodante RED founded in 1987 and tasked with teaching theatre to poor youths. He also collaborated with other social activities in his native town, such as class reunions.

== Death ==
Shorty Castro moved to his granddaughter house in Altamonte Springs, Florida after the wake of Hurricane Maria due to the loss of electricity and his poor health including cancer. He died on January 22, 2018 at age 89. He was buried at Cementerio Municipal de Mayagüez in Mayagüez, Puerto Rico.

== Legacy ==
Puerto Rican Public Law 186 (2010) honored Castro by naming a newly constructed shoreline park in Mayagüez, the Parque del Litoral, after him.

== Original characters ==
Castro eventually became a major player in Muñiz's productions, developing comedic characters of his own. Among these were:

- Ángelo - a mischievous angel that played pranks on other angels that lived among the clouds in heaven, generally annoying Ángel Guardián, the head angel, played by Jacobo Morales. This character was a favorite of Benicio del Toro's, who claims to have mimicked it as a child.
- Armando Galán y Figura - a ladies' man, always on the prowl for female company and constantly acting the part
- Ramoneta Cienfuegos de la O - an old maid, constantly craving male companionship, in a way similar to José Miguel Agrelot's Pasión character
- Camellito - a clever drunkard, named for his prodigious consumption of alcohol, which resembled that of a camel drinking water
- El Conde de París - an enigmatic, silent character -nominally a count- dressed in 1870s garb and a top hat who acted physical comedy bits that were the complete opposite of what was logically expected: pulling a ladder from behind a painter who had to hang from a ceiling, for example. The character's name is a play on Castro's home neighborhood in Mayagüez, named after Paris, France. The character played its bits against a musical backdrop: Ennio Morricone's Muscoli di Velluto, an instrumental song written for the Italian film "I Malamondo". This European-themed character was a personal favorite of Raul Julia's, who would later dress similarly in the final scene of La Gran Fiesta, a Puerto Rican film.
- Don Bernabé - a brash millionaire, dressed in a white suit and Knudsen hat, who would buy out anything and anybody who would stand in his way.
- Don Celedonio - an old man who plays domino in the park with three other old men in the TV show "Los Kakukómicos". Celedonio always makes fun of the one of them which always arrives late, calling him "Quick Arrow" ("Flecha Veloz").
- Panchito Zapata y Correa - a short Mexican revolutionary soldier with a large sombrero and wide moustache.
- Cabo Alejo - a short policeman with a large baton.
- Policarpio - a short, skilled, quick handyman who goes by the nickname "Poli"; he is the boyfriend of a handmaid named Enriqueta in the TV show "Entrando por la cocina".
- El Otro Gemelo - one of a comic duo of singing twins called "Los Gemelos del Oeste", a parody of real life duo "Los Gemelos del Sur", in the TV show "Esto no tiene nombre". The other twin was Shorty's real life brother, David. They opened their act by dancing to the Jewish folk song "Hava Nagila", then told several jokes, and always ended their part fighting with each other.
- Teniente Tito - also called "Tenientito" (Little Lieutenant), a short, grouchy army officer.
- Rolo - a short look-alike of Shorty's friend, Cuban singer Rolando Laserie, who is always watching TV. After each news or ad he listens to, he asks his wife in a loud voice: "¿Oíste eso, Tita?" (Did you hear that, Tita?), as the real Rolando always did.
