= Los Hispanos (quartet) =

Puerto Rican vocal quartet active in 1960s New York City

Los Hispanos was a Puerto-Rican vocal quartet active in 1960s New York City.

One of their lead singers, Carlos Camacho, was also a pastor in the southern Puerto Rican city of Ponce. He died on August 11, 2023, at the age of 73.
