= Otilio Warrington =

Puerto Rican comedian (born 1949)

Bizcocho
- Born: Otilio Warrington; February 26, 1949 (age 77); Santurce, Puerto Rico
- Years active: 1960s–present
- Children: Alí Warrington; Kalil Warrington

Otilio Warrington, known popularly as Bizcocho (born February 26, 1949) is a comedian, best known for his roles of "Bizcocho" and "Cuca Gómez". Among the shows which Warrington has hosted are Friendo y Comiendo and "A Freir y a Comer" alongside Luis Antonio Cosme, Café con Leche alongside Lily García and Yan Ruíz and a television program transmitted through WAPA-TV called La Cocina Caliente de Luis y Bizcocho (Luis and Bizcocho's Hot Kitchen), alongside Luisito Vigoreaux; Hola Gente alongside Alexandra Fuentes and Gerardo Ortiz; and together with Lily and Yan a morning show called "¡Buenos Días!" (Good Morning!) Actor José Reymundí began a strike against Producciones Tommy Muñiz in 1973, in particular against its administrator Hérnan Nigaglioni, claiming that he had been left out of a local production to favor foreigners. Warrington, Candal, Morales, Carbia, Molina and García left to create Producciones ASTRA and joined Channel 7. This would only last for some years, since the company gained a reputation for supporting work syndicates and were avoided. After working for different shows landed a spot in " Cogiendo Impulso", which was transmitted on Channel 11; it was here that he developed the characters of "Juancito" and "Pito". While working in the comedy Los Kakukomicos, Warrington played the character of "Cuca Gómez", a cross-dressing role that would help settle Warrington's fame as a comedian. The plot involved a female cosmetologist who was involved in all kinds of hilarious and off-the-wall situations. "Cuca Gómez" became very popular in Puerto Rico and soon appeared in other TV shows as a special guest star. In 1985, Warrington was named "Mr. Television" by the Artistic Association of Puerto Rico. Along Juan Manuel Lebrón, Warrington was recognized as one of the best improv comedians in Puerto Rico during the 1980s.

== Entertainment career ==
=== Early years ===
Encouraged by Muñiz's challenge, Warrington returned to school and graduated from Central High School of Santurce in mid-late 1960s; he then went back to Muñiz to take him up on his earlier offer. While he resumed his job polishing boots, the producer summoned him to the studio in order to appear in the debuting military comedy. Tommy Muñiz kept his word and let Otilio assist in the TV show "El Special de Corona" (The Corona Special). He made his television debut on August 22, 1967, at the age of 16, having been given the stagename of "Bizcocho" as a placeholder. Thus, Warrington became the first black Puerto Rican male comedian to be regularly featured on a local TV program. Nervous and inexperienced, his first scene was shot six times. One of the show's sections involved a group of "wacky" soldiers and included José Miguel Agrelot (as "Sargento Manteca) and Jacobo Morales. When Otilio joined the group, Morales baptized him as "Soldier Bizcocho" (Cake), a nickname that would remain with him for the rest of his life.

Muñiz saw potential in Otilio and paid for his college education; as a result Warrington attended the University of Puerto Rico graduating with an associate degree in Television Direction and Production. After graduation Otilio participated in many local TV programs such as "El Show del Mediodía" (The Noon Show). In 1970, a new show titled Ja-ja, ji-ji, jo-jo con Agrelot began airing and he made appearances in it. In October 1970, Warrington participated in a homage held for Norma Candal at Club Iguazú. On August 20, 1971, Warrington wrestled Shorty Castro in a no-referee, no holds barred matches as part of a series of homages to José Miguel Pérez for his undefeated run as WWWF World Tag Team Champion held at the Hiram Bithorn Stadium at San Juan Estadio Paquito Montaner at Ponce. He also joined Teatro Moderno in the Festival de Comedias organized at the Ateneo Puertorriqueño and which included the plays Si se muriera mi suegra by Maggie Hernández, El Manicomio Loco by Felipe Montes and La Criada Aprovechada y la Máquina Maravillosa by Enrique Fuentes. In October 1971, Warrington performed in the Puerto Rican Independence Party (PIP) 25th anniversary show held at Country Club. In December 1971, Warrington received a homage at Residencial Luis Lloréns Torres. He was also contracted for other events with popular appeal, such as hosting a trip to Disney World where people could join him.

Despite being regarded as a successful artist, appearing in the Show del Mediodía among others, Warrington won about $125 per week plus a car during this stage of his career. Due to this and the firing of actor José Rey Mundo, he joined a strike against Producciones Tommy Muñiz. Soon afterwards, the protests grew as APATE joined and people like Castro decided not to cross the picket lines, while others like Candal where active in the frontlines. Morales in turn decided to quit on the air. Only Alida Arizmendi challenged the protests. WAPA-TV decided not to intervene and distanced itself from the issue. In the end, Muñiz granted the demands of the protestors, such as health coverage or six month contracts, but Reymundí was unable to benefit due to the cancellation of the production due to the strike. Producciones Tommy Muñiz was affected by it, with only productions like Esto no tiene nombre or Ja-ja, ji-ji, jo-jo con Agrelot surviving. Afterwards, Warrington resumed his participation at WAPA-TV. In December 1973, he was among several media personalities that visited a collection of international owl figurines gathered Rita Caro de Caro and exhibited at the Villa Cofresí hotel at Rincón.

Warrington was contracted by Humberto Vidal, a local shoe store chain, to promote a line of yo-yos intended to be used in competitive games. Emilio E. Huyke published Los Comediantes: Risas de Oro para Toda la Familia (1974) which included a section dedicated to him. In December 1973, Warrington was fired from WAPA-TV. However, he began working on a concept named Bizcocho y su Tropa for Telecadena Pérez Perry, where the show was given a weekend slot and included the participation of Awilda Chávez. On December 20, 1973, Warrington wrote to APATE president William Valentín that he was uninterested in returning to work with Producciones Tommy Muñiz. As rumors for his dismissal made the rounds in the media, Muñiz insisted that he had not fired any artist. Two months later, Warrington was one of the founding members of Producciones Internacionales ASTRA, a corporation intended to produce new television content.

In June 1975, Warrington revived the promotion where he would join a group in a trip sponsored by Club de Turismo Jet-Set to Disney World. In August 1975, he was cast as the titular character of Teatro La Máscara's comedic play El Bebe Furioso, playing a tempestuous baby. Two months later, Warrington participated in the event Dale la Mano a tu Hermano, held at the Juan Ramón Loubriel Stadium to raise funds for the people affected by a storm named Eloísa. He also participated in the tele-marathon held by the Puerto Rican Independence Party (PIP). In November 1975, Warrington rejoined the cast of El Bebé Furioso for a series of shows at Teatro Matienzo. In April 1977, Warrington performed at Teatro La Perla, where a series of plays by Marqués and Méndez Ballester were organized. He joined Awilda Carbia in Awilda en Desconcierto, where he was tasked with singing salsa songs. In October 1978, Warrington joined Edgardo Huertas to present the comedy-musical show El Bembé at Café Teatro La Tea at Old San Juan. In early 1979, he was featured in WKAQ-TV's El Show de Nydia Caro where he was tasked with the comedy skits and resumed his role as a baby. He continued active in the channel's programming, being also featured in El Súper Show Goya. Warrington participated in Qué caras… Qué gestos along Awilda Carbia at the University of Puerto Rico's Mayagüez campus. During this month Jacobo Morales' Díos los Cría (lit. "And God raises them") was released strring him, alongside Norma Candal, Gladys Rodríguez, Esther Sandoval and Alicia Moreda.

In August 1979, Warrington was featured as a special act in El Súper Show Goya. During the 1970s, he also developed a parody of Awilda Carbia's most sentimental and sensitive characterization. Warrington also sponsored the 1979 Maratón Cima del Yunque to raise funds for tue Sociedad de Niños y Adultos Lisiados, a non-profit organization that helped incapacitated people. Warrington performed at the Fiestas Patronales at Ciales. In December 1979, Warrington was cast in the role of the "Royal Court's Jester" in Teatro La Máscara's adaption of Cinderella. The play debuted at Teatro Matienzo in Santurce, before continuing at Teatro La Perla at Ponce and Teatro Tapia in Old San Juan. Warrington continued working with Teatro La Máscara in the troupe's adaptation of Manuel Méndez Ballester's Los Cocorocos which was presented at Teatro Tapia as part of the Festival de Teatro Puertorriqueño. He joined the group when the play continued at Teatro Sylvia Rexach. In June 1980, Warrington resumed his appearance in Cinderella when Teatro La Máscara brought it to Teatro Tapia, returned to La Perla and moved to Centro Cultural de Mayagüez. His performance was critiqued as "very funny", carried by his misadventures along the Prince and by one of his songs, which was a catchy earworm described as staying in people's minds for weeks.

=== Popularity of Cuca Gómez (1980–1989) ===
Beginning in 1980, Warrington joined several other artists and performed comedy along them for Island Tourists, a local tourism firm, appearing in a number of events that celebrated different occasions such as Valentine's Day. He also became involved with the Casa del Artista, participating in a game that the Leones de Ponce held to promote the project. During the winter he participated in the Día de la Cobfraternidad, an annual event held for the patients of the Río Piedras Medical Center. In January 1981, Warrington and Shorty Castro were announced for a Three Kings Day show at Safari Park, but logistics prevented him from arriving. In February 1981, Warrington participated in an event sponsored by the Blue Cross of Puerto Rico where several artists joined players from the Puerto Rico winter baseball league. He also joined Artistas de Radio y Televisión, a softball team, to play against a team from Jardines de Caparra to help that community raise funds for their youth baseball program. He also hosted the opening act of a professional boxing card held at Aguada, Salsa en el Ring, performing a comedy skit featuring Cuca Gómez. During this time, the cosmetologist character created by writer Felipe San Pedro gained momentum and was also featured in a concert at Guaynabo. Warrington also sponsored another event for the youth baseball league of Jardines de Caparra, named Liga Pirulí and hosting children from ages 5 to 8.

Warrington also continued active in theater, joining Teatro La Máscara for another season of Cinderella at Teatro Riviera. In May 1981, he performed as Cuca Gómez and joined Shorty Castro in a Mother's Day concert starring Wylkins at Caguas. Warrington participated in the Súper Telespecial 1981 to raise funds for the Sociedad de Niños y Adultos Lisiados. He also joined Chucho Avellanet when he celebrated 20 years of music career at Teatro Tapia, performing along Juan Manuel Lebrón and Marlene Gual. His performance was well received. In August 1981, Warrington joined several artists in a tribute held on the 25th anniversary of the death of Diplo held at Cementerio Santa María Magdalena de Pazzis. The following month, he was involved in a concert to raise funds for the Casa del Artista. Warrington also joined Lourdes Chacón in an event sponsored by the furniture retail industry. He also joined a softball game between artists and the Rho Delta Omicron fraternity that was played at Patillas. Warrington was invited to throw the forst pitch of a LBPPR game between the Criollos de Caguas and Bayamón. In 1982, he returned to work with the tourism industry, this time performing as Cuca Gómez in a St. Valentine's Day party for Islanda Tourists. In March 1982, he participated in a concert to raise funds for Ciudad Deportiva Roberto Clemente. Warrington rejoined Teatro La Máscara and reprised the role of the "King Court's Jester" when Cinderella was brought to Centro de Bellas Artes. He continued active in the venue, being cast in Emilio E. Hyuke's comedy Cuando él… Es Guadalupe starring Awilda Carbia. The play was successful and its stay at the Drama Room was extended.

In August 1982, Warrington participated in a concert sponsored by Comité Acción Social Ecuménico Puertorriqueño. He joined Juan Manuel Lebrón and appeared in eliminators organized by the Puerto Rico Target Shooting Federation. The success of Cuca Gómez also benefited other actors, leading to the creation of Rosita Velázquez's character "Gloria", who was created as an insane model who appeared in the skits. In August 1983, Warrington returned to another edition of the marathon to help the disabled. Warrington was included in the cast of Conexión Caribe (1984), a movie that featured the group Los Chicos which attempted to capitalize on a boy band craze that took place during this time. During the mid-1980s, Warrington was featured in the cooking show Friendo y Comiendo along Luis Antonio Cosme and Mercedes Marchand, competing with a similar program that aired on WAPA-TV. In April 1984, he rejoined Carbia for a show held at the DuPont Plaza Hotel for the Week of the Secretaries. The following month, Warrington participated in another telemarathon for the disabled. He also made recurring appearances in El Show de Chucho Avellanet as Cuca Gómez. Despite being popular, the character was also controversial and faced some pushback due to being perceived as transvestism.

In September 1984, Warrington also aided the New York branch of the Sociedad de Niños y Adultos Lisiados to raise funds in another telemarathon that aired on Channel 7. In January 1985, Warrington was recruited as the presenter of the Noches Borincanas, sponsored by the Municipality of Sabana Grande and featuring Juan Manuel Lebrón and other groups. The following month, he participated in WKAQ-TV's Noche de Gala: Una Noche con Cheo Feliciano, where the 25th anniversary of the artist's career was celebrated. After Avellanet left the station, Warrington joined Carbia, Lebrón and Mayté Flores in Estudio Alegre, where they were tasked with hosting a different guest artist every week and also comedy segments. In March 1985, he joined several artists to help fishermen affected by a series of swells in Artistas Pro Fondos Pescadores Sur de Vieques, where he appeared as a master of ceremonies. Warrington also participated in another telemarathon to raise funds for Ciudad Deportiva Roberto Clemente sponsored by WKAQ-TV. For Easter, he was part of the Concierto en la Montaña event organized at Naranjito. Warrington received the "Caballero Telvisión" award from the New York-based Asociación de Cronistas de Espectáculos (ACE).

In May 1985, Warrington returned to another edition of the telemarathon for the disabled. During the summer, Warrington was featured as part of Channel 47's float at the New York Puerto Rican Day Parade, creating a rare instance where an artist exclusive to WKAQ-TV was featured in WAPA-TV's programming. During this time, he also appeared in the weekend slot as part of Súper Sábado. In July 1985, Warrington was recruited by the Puerto Rico Health Department as a volunteer in a public campaign to support vaccination. In August 1985, Carbia's Desconcierto returned to Centro de Bellas Artes and he once again joined the cast of the show as "Reguerete" and "Cuca Gómez". After Rosita Velázquez had issues with Rolando Barral, she was replaced by Warrington as presenter of Súper Sábado, remaining there after the actress made her return. However, that same week he was himself involved in an incident, when Marchand was angered by a comedy skit in Friendo y Comiendo which she considered "in bad taste". This incident did not affect the composition of the show, which continued. When Juan Manuel Lebron participated in the OTI Festival, Warrington, Velázquez, Carbia and Paquito Cordero traveled to Spain to support him. In October 1985, Warrington returned to radio by participating in a "Christmas anticipation" show. In October he donated to Fundacion Ángel Ramos to help families affected by a series of floods. In October 1985, Warrington joined the telemarathon Unidos por Puerto Rico held at the Roberto Clemente Coliseum. The following month, he was part of Adelante Juventud's first anniversary show. As part of Los Kakukómicos, Warrington was tasked with interviewing Walter Mercado in his first appearance in years for WKAQ-TV, which he did as "Cuca Gómez".

In December 1985, Warrington was selected as the spokesperson of the SNAL, replacing Sandra Zaiter in the role. He was also featured in the channel's New Year's show. In January 1986, Warrington was chosen to be Rey Momo at the Carnaval Juan Ponce de León at San Juan. In March 1986, Warrington joined the Equipo Nacional de Softbol de Artistas and played a doubleheader against a team from Isabela. Later that month, Marchand left Friendo y Comiendo, leaving him and Cosme as hosts. Warrington also joined Shorty Castro in an event held at Hacienda Paola in Río Grande. For another consecutive year, he participated as presenter in the telemarathon to raise funds for Ciudad Deportiva Roberto Clemente. Warrington won the 1986 Cemí Dorado award for best comedian, which was elected by popular vote at the Festival de Arte El Cemí. In April 1986, Warrington participated in a send off party for actress Von Marie Méndez. In May 1986, Warrington made public expressions denying rumors that a move to WAPA-TV was imminent. Pijuán, a Puerto Rican musician, in conjunction with Bizcocho created an album called Bizcocho & Pijuán "El premio 'Gordo' del Sabor", under Private Ranch Records.

During the summer, Warrington led a march to raise funds for the SNAL. He also served as presenter in the annual telemarathon for the organization, which gathered over $800,000. During this time, Warrington participated in a homage organized by WKAQ-TV for the entertainment press at Restaurant La Veranda in Hotel San Juan. He also made an appearance in Pepe H. Rodríguez's cooking show, Cocinando con Pepe H. as an invited colleague and guest chef. In July 1986, Warrington joined Carbia's Desconcierto '86: Una década de risas as an invited comedian. In December 1986, Warrington participated in the Nabisco Christmas Open, a tennis tournament, along other artists. He also helped raise funds for the Children's Hospital in an event titled La Fiesta de Oficina Más Grande del Mundo. After WAPA-TV debuted Entrando por la cocina as direct competition, Friendo y Comiendo collaborated with the Grande supermarket chain to sell an apron with the faces of Warrington and Cosme. He returned to the channel's New Year's Eve show.

His space within Los Kakukómicos became known as "Cuca's Key Club", while he also continued performing other characters such as "Reguerete" and "Tongolele" in the show. In February 1987, Warrington joined Roberto Vigoreaux as presenters of the Festival Gourmet de Puerto Rico, a culinary event. In April 1987, Warrington joined several artists to face a team of retired basketball players to raise funds for the SNAL. He was part of the cast of the movie Contigo, contigo (1987) which release in Puerto Rico and Latin America. During this time, Warrington also debuted in the musical comedy play Oficina Al Revés organized at Club Caribe of the Caribbean Hilton Hotel. He played the character of "Adelo", who wanted to lose weight but couldn't stop eating. During the summer, he participated in a caravan to gather funds for the SNAL. As usual, this was followed by his participation in the organization's annual telemarathon. During the summer, Warrington's name was publicly tied to an upcoming WAPA-TV show named El Gordo de Oro. He received a "tempting offer" from Luisito Vigoreaux to end his tenure of almost 20 years with Cordero Teleproducciones and join as the presenter, but evaluated the decision for some weeks since his contract expired in December. Warrington, who at the moment had lost 25 pounds due to a diet, launched a singing career and recorded an LP in the meanwhile. Remaining with Paquito Cordero, Warrington continued in Friendo y Comiendo and Estudio Alegre and also returned as a chef to the Festival Gourmet de Puerto Rico for the SNAL, now renamed SER de Puerto Rico. Warrington and Cosme collaborated with recipes in Vigoreaux's book Luisito en la Cocina de Hoy.

When the 35th anniversary of the Virgen del Pozo Marian apparitions at Sabana Grande, Warrington joined Agrelot, Lebrón and other artists participated in a celebration. Warrington also joined Vigoreaux's play Divorcio por amor, which was organized at Centro de Bellas Artes. In May 1988, he participated in a march to raise funds for Hogar CREA. In November 1988, Warrington and Lebrón were contracted to participate in the Feria Descubre Nuestros Productos, an event sponsored by the government to promote local products. When WKAQ-TV celebrated 35 years, Warrington was included along Lebrón, Carbia, Wylkins and Menudo representing the 1980s. In April 1989, he returned to La Oficina al Revés when it was presented at the Roberto Clemente Coliseum. After participating in the play, with a script by Sunshine Logroño, the rumors about his eventual jump to WAPA-TV were revived. Warrington also joined Vigoreaux and Cosme as cooks in the Festival Nacional del Camarón de Agua Dulce. During the summer of 1989, it was announced that he recorded a Puerto Rican music LP with Cosme, which marked his first salsa recording. In August, Warrington once again served as presenter of the SER de Puerto Rico telemarathon. In November, he joined Cosme at the Casera sponsored Feria de la Cocina at the Canton Mall in Bayamón.

=== Musicomedia '90 and Mi Familia (1990–2003) ===
Entering the 1990s, Warrington, Lebrón and Magaly Carrasquillo were included in WKAQ-TV's Wednesday slot with Musicomedia '90. In March 1990, he returned to the titular role when Teatro La Máscara reenacted El Bebé Furioso at Teatro Tapia, but did not receive the same critical support as before. Warrington was invited by Logroño to participate in the anniversary of Sunshine's Café at the Hiram Bithorn Stadium. During the summer, he participated in an artists basketball game where he joined the Galanes de Puerto Rico to face an international counterpart. Late in the year, Warrington worked with Cosme in a Christmas LP and a book. During this time, he also continued debuting characters, including one based on Angela Carrasco and Celia Cruz. In November 1990, Warrington appeared in the "Caperucita" skit of Musicomedia '90, bit he fell and hit his head while performing as the Big Bad Wolf in a show with Nydia Caro, prompting a commercial break to reorganize a second take. During this time, Warrington starred in his own TV show, Mi Familia (My Family), where he acted as "Arcadio". He also worked in El Show de las 12 (The 12 o'clock Show) acting as "Don Ambrosio" and "Yeyito".

== Personal life ==
Warrington was born in the Barrio Obrero area of Santurce, Puerto Rico. When he was nine years old, his family moved to the Lloréns Torres public housing project. There he lived for the next 25 years. His mother worked as a house maid at Hotel Darlington in San Juan. Warrington left school when he was a teenager and made a living by polishing shoes at a local barbershop. One of the barbershop's regular customers was Tommy Muñiz, a television show producer. One day Warrington asked Muñiz for a job in television, but was told to get some more education and come back to him after he graduated. Warrington became intrinsically linked to the nickname "Bizcocho", named after his very first character, and was noted early in his career to possess a talent for comedy despite still being regarded as a developing performer. He didn't distance himself from his roots and participated in events for the residents of public housing. Warrington considered himself a people's person, who believed in sharing with fans of all ages and genders. His tendency to visit sick children and hospitals was known. Despite admitting that he possessed fame, Warrington noted that his work as a comedian often forced him to make others laugh while feeling sad.

On August 3, 1973, Warrington married Ana Rosa Vélez in a ceremony that was aired through WAPA-TV, during which José Miguel Agrelot and Carmita Jiménez the wedding godparents while Norma Candal hosted the toast. Prior to the event, he participated in a comedy skit in Sube Nene Sube where his peers helped him win $15,000 worth of prizes. In June 1989, Warrington was joined by his children Ali and Kalil in a special edition of Súper Sábados. During the 1980s, Warrington criticized the local politicians for being "lazy, unscrupulous [and wasting time] discrediting themselves instead of working together for the people." Outside the entertainment industry, Warrington also opened a business known as El barril de Bizcocho during the 1980s.

=== Health problems ===
Besides an afro that was discontinued during the 1970s, Warrington kept a consistent image and was always known for being overweight and jolly. Despite becoming part of his presentation also caused him insomnia and fatigue during the 1980s, forcing him to drop weight after reaching 305 pounds. He noted that the change would not affect his personality and opted to do so naturally, without pharmaceutical help. However, he later noted that every time that he completed a diet, the rebound effect would make him recover the weight within weeks. Warrington had gallbladder surgery during 2017, after it was discovered, during a visit to an emergency room, that he had stones inside that organ.

== See also ==
- List of Puerto Ricans
- Black history in Puerto Rico
- Pijuan
