= Ramón Rivero =

Puerto Rican comedian, actor, composer

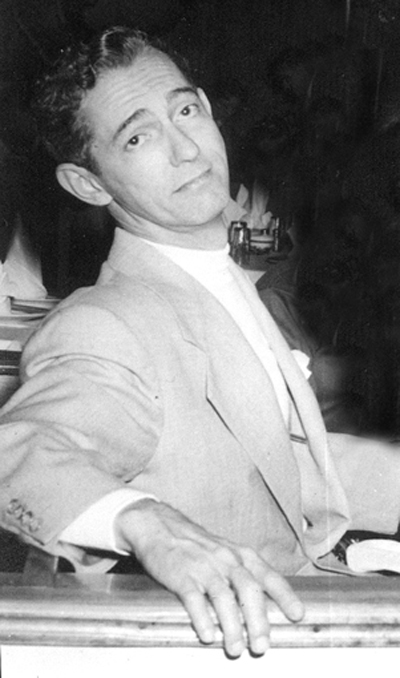
- Rivero at the Stork Club, NYC
- Born: Arturo Ramón Máximo Ortiz del Rivero; May 29, 1909; Naguabo, Puerto Rico
- Died: August 24, 1956 (aged 47); San Juan, Puerto Rico
- Other name: Diplo
- Occupations: actor, comedian, composer
- Years active: 1936–1956
- Height: 5 ft 6 in (168 cm)
- Spouse: Alicia Bibiloni (1949–1956)
- Website: Official site

Ramón Rivero (May 29, 1909 – August 24, 1956) — known as Diplo — was a Puerto Rican comedian, actor, and composer. Rivero made his television debut in Puerto Rico in "La Taberna India" (The India Tavern), the first comedy/variety show on Puerto Rican TV. He starred in the movies Los Peloteros ("The Baseball Players"), and Una Gallega en La Habana ("A Gallega in Havana").

Rivero organized the world's first known Walk-A-Thon, to raise money for the Liga Puertorriqueña Contra el Cáncer (the Puerto Rican League Against Cancer).

== Early years ==
Rivero (birth name: Arturo Ramón Máximo Ortiz del Rivero) was born in the town of Naguabo, Puerto Rico, to José Ortiz Alibrán and Providencia del Rivero. His first house was in La Cambímbora street at Playa Húcares. In 1917, his family moved to the Old San Juan section of San Juan, the capital of Puerto Rico. There he received his primary and secondary education. As a young man he learned to play various musical instruments, among them the piano, the guitar and the mandolin, under the tutelage of Amelia Maestú y Jorge Rubiano. His father, a lawyer, sent him to Ontario, Canada to study law, however while he was in Canada, he learned to play baseball and received an offer to try out for the New York Giants major league team. He did not accept the offer and when he returned to Puerto Rico he joined the "Senadores de San Juan" (San Juan Senators) baseball club. Rivero married and found it difficult to sustain his family economically as a professional baseball player, therefore he moved with his family to the town of Cayey and worked as a physical education instructor at a local school.

== Career as an entertainer ==
External audio
- Ramon Rivero as "Diplo" in his "El Tremendo Hotel" (1953) on YouTube
- and in a television show sketch (1956) on YouTube

In Cayey, he met and befriended Jose Luis Torregrosa, and joined Torregrosa's traveling theatrical company. Torregrosa became his best friend and later served as his comedy sidekick. Together they acted in the comedy "El proceso de Armando Líos"; this experience convinced Rivero to pursue a career in comedy. After witnessing a comedy by Cuban comedian Leopoldo Fernández also known as "Tres Patines", Rivero adopted the idea of creating a comical "Afro-Puerto Rican" character. His inspiration for the character was someone he met during his youth years in San Juan called "Diplomacia", hence he named his character "Diplo". Together with Torregrosa, Rivero founded "La Farándula Bohemia", a theatrical company in which he was able to develop the character "Diplo" and make him known to the public. Rivero's father asked him to change his name because another son was a priest, and having a comedian in the family ran against propriety. Rivero respected his father's request and changed his name from Arturo Ramón Máximo Ortiz del Rivero to Ramón Rivero, and he added the nickname "Diplo". Among the local talents that Rivero and Torregrosa discovered was Juan Boria, a Puerto Rican poet who would become known for his Afro-Caribbean poetry. In 1941, Boria was participating in a show in the town of Loíza. Rivero and Torregrosa, who were present, were so impressed with Boria's performance that they incorporated him into their troupe.

Rivero's comedy act became well known, not only on the traveling theatrical scene, but also in the local radio shows such as "Los embajadores del buen humor" (Ambassadors of Good Humor), "La vida en broma" (Life as a Joke) and "El Tremendo Hotel" (The tremendous hotel), where he also actively participated as a script writer. During World War II, Rivero and his acting troupe, the "La Farándula Bohemia" (Bohemian Show-business), traveled to the United States military bases in which Puerto Rican troops were stationed and not only did he entertain the men, but he also accepted and delivered mail to the families of those whom he met overseas. Puerto Rican industrialist Angel Ramos, owner of WKAQ Radio, signed an exclusive deal with Rivero to broadcast "El Tremendo Hotel" via the airwaves. His show became the most popular radio show in Puerto Rico. "El Tremendo Hotel", together with his other production La Farándula Corona, catapulted WKAQ to the top of the ratings. Among the many Puerto Rican artists who began their careers in "El Tremendo Hotel" were Luis Vigoreaux, Miguel Ángel Álvarez and Sylvia Rexach. On one occasion, Rivero denounced and lambasted a foreign newspaperwoman who had published an article in the U.S. stating that "Puerto Rican men sold their women to the American servicemen", exhorting his countrymen to expel her from Puerto Rico (which they did), during a radio broadcast of El Tremendo Hotel.

After years of success in radio, Rivero debuted on television at WKAQ-TV with similar following. La Taberna India, similar in concept to Duffy's Tavern. After hosting the show for a year, Rivero left the role. Six months later, he debuted La Farándula Corona. Rivero produced and acted in various theatrical productions in Puerto Rico among them Mosquilandia (Mosquito Land), El Príncipe Wele-Wele (Prince Wele-Wele), A Mi Me Matan Pero Yo Gozo (They can kill me, but I'll enjoy it), Ese Niño Es Mio (The child is mine), Hay Que Defenderse (One must defend himself), La Familia del Lío (The family of problems) and El Tremendo Hotel, however his success was not limited to the theater and radio.

In 1946, El Mundo, a local newspaper, began a comic strip about Rivero's character Diplo, making this the first time that a Puerto Rican from the local entertainment industry received such a distinction. Rivero was a pioneer of Puerto Rican television who produced the first comedy show La Taberna India (The India Saloon) for Angel Ramos's Telemundo, a local television station. He became known to his fans as the "Rey de la Farándula" (King of Show-business) and "Señor Televisión" (Mr. Television). In winter 1953, Rivero and his troupe traveled to New York City to perform before the Puerto Rican community which had migrated and settled there during the Great Puerto Rican migration of the 1940s. For three weeks Rivero and his show "El Tremendo Hotel" held sold-out performances at the Teatro San Juan, Teatro Hispano and the Teatro Puerto Rico.

== Actor and composer ==
External audio
- Scene from "Los Peloteros" on YouTube
- and from "Una Gallega en la Habana" on YouTube

In Cuba, Rivero participated in the movie Una Gallega en la Habana with Niní Marshall, however it was in Puerto Rico that in 1953, he played the lead role of "Pepe" in what is possibly the best motion picture ever made in the island, Los Peloteros ("The Baseball Players") (with Puerto Rican actress Míriam Colón co-starring as his wife, Lolita) under the direction of Jack Delano. The movie, which is based on a real-life story, is about a man (Pepe) who, despite the fact that no one takes him seriously, is willing to coach a group of very poor children and help them raise funds for their baseball team. It was produced by the government sponsored División de Educación de la Comunidad (DIVEDCO).

Rivero wrote more than 3000 scripts for radio, theater, television and motion pictures and was the author of ¿Por qué se ríe la gente? (What Makes People Laugh), and El Album de la Radio, (1940–1948), a significant study and the first historical record of the radio industry in Puerto Rico. Rivero also composed more than ten songs, among them "¿Por qué será?" (Why is it?), "Ya me olvidaste" (You already forgot me), "Comienza el fin" (The beginning of the end), "Así es" (That's how it is), "Me gustó" (I liked it), "Hola, don Pepito" (Hello, Mister Pepito) and "Donde quiera que tú vayas" (Wherever you go).

== Activist ==
External audio
- Newsreel of Rivero in the world's first "Walk-A-Thon" on YouTube

In 1953, Rivero organized the world's first known Walk-A-Thon. He walked 80 miles from the capital city of San Juan, crossing Puerto Rico up and down the treacherous mountain roads of Cayey, known as "La Piquiña", to Ponce, on the other side of the island, to raise money for the Liga Puertorriqueña Contra el Cáncer (the Puerto Rican League Against Cancer). In that walkathon, Rivero raised the equivalent of $85,000 in 4 days. The Walk-A-Thon turned into a historical event that became part of the collective consciousness of Puerto Ricans all over the world, and has been copied several times since. Rivero also defended the victims of injustice during student revolts at the University of Puerto Rico, led the first actors' strike on the island, and was the first producer/personality to actively combat racial prejudice on Puerto Rican television, incorporating blacks in his television shows; first in "La Taberna India" (Juan Boria), followed by Rita Delgado and Dixon as cast members of his "La Farándula Corona".

== Health and death ==
In 1955, Rivero's doctors recommended that he lessen his work activities for the good of his health. Cervecería India, Inc., Puerto Rico's largest beer brewery and the sponsor of "La Taberna India", did not agree with his doctors request and required that Rivero continue producing 3 weekly television shows for them, resulting in Rivero's refusal and resignation. He then approached Cervecería Corona (Cervecería India's competitor) with the idea of producing a weekly television comedy show. Cervecería Corona agreed to sponsor the show which he named "La Farándula Corona". Rivero's new show became very popular among the Puerto Rican audiences.

Rivero was in the process of organizing his performing troupe, which was to travel to the town of Yabucoa in an attempt to help the town after it was devastated by the Santa Clara hurricane, when on August 24, 1956, he suddenly died of a congenital aneurysm. Rivero was the father of five children, three from his first two marriages and two which he had in his third marriage with Puerto Rican actress Alicia Bibiloni. Rivero was buried at Cementerio Santa María Magdalena de Pazzi, San Juan, Puerto Rico, and a state of national mourning for two weeks was declared on the island. It was estimated by "El Imparcial", a local newspaper, that a total of 50,000 of his countrymen attended his burial. Due to his untimely sudden death, Rivero was unable to participate in an anticipated film with Hollywood actress Rita Hayworth.

== Legacy ==
The memory of Rivero has been honored by both by the Government of Puerto Rico, who declared a national Ramon Rivero "Diplo" day in 2009, and by Naguabo his hometown who named an urbanization after him. In 1965, a 15-foot bronze statue/monument to Ramon Rivero "Diplo" was unveiled in the town square. Puerto Rican poet Juan Antonio Corretjer wrote "Morir y Reír (A Ramón Rivero)" (Laugh and Die (To Ramón Rivero)) a poem dedicated to Rivero and his character "Diplo". On June 16, 2006, the Government of Puerto Rico approved "Ley Num. 115" (Law Number 115) which declares every May 29 the "Day of Ramón Ortiz del Rivero (Diplo)" In 2009, a "Diplo Returns to San Juan" walkathon, in memory of the first event, raised almost $200,000. In 2009, in the commemoration of his 100th birthday, the Fundación Ramón Rivero released the book, "Diplo! ¿Por qué se reía la gente?"; Authored by José Orbi; ISBN 978-0-9661619-2-2.

== TV creator/producer ==
- La Taberna India
- La Farándula Corona

== Theater ==
- El Tremendo Hotel
- A mi me matan pero yo gozo
- La familia del lío
- Diplo contra Hitler
- El Príncipe Wele Wele
- Ese niño es mio
- Hay que defenderse

== Films ==
- Los Peloteros
- Una Gallega en la Habana

== Radio ==
- El Tremendo Hotel
- La vida en broma
- El colegio del amor
- La agencia del amor

== Music/Composer ==
Among the songs composed by Rivero are the following

- ¿Por qué será?
- Donde quiera que tú vayas
- Hola, don Pepito
- Las Penas de mi amor
- Llora monina
- Ya me olvidaste
- Juan Calalú
- Me gustó
- La vieja se desmayó

== Books ==
- El album de la radio (1941-1948)
- ¿Por qué se ríe la gente?

== See also ==
- List of Puerto Ricans
- List of Puerto Rican comedians
