= José Miguel Agrelot =

Puerto Rican comedian (1927–2004)

- Agrelot portraying his iconic character Don Cholito
- Born: Giuseppe Michael Agrelot Vilá; April 21, 1927; San Juan, Puerto Rico, U.S.
- Died: January 28, 2004 (aged 76); San Juan, Puerto Rico, U.S.
- Occupations: Comedian; radio show host
- Honors: José Miguel Agrelot Coliseum (posthumous)

Giuseppe Michael Agrelot Vilá (April 21, 1927 – January 28, 2004), also known as José Miguel Agrelot or Don Cholito, was a Puerto Rican comedian, radio and television host. During the 1950s, Agrelot and Tommy Muñiz performed in theatre as a comedy duo.

== Early life ==
Agrelot was born in Santurce, a barrio of San Juan, Puerto Rico. He was the third of four children of Felipe Antonio Agrelot Fittipaldi and Ana Luisa Vilá Cruz. His paternal grandparents were born in Lauria, Italy, and immigrated to Puerto Rico in 1892, two years before his father's birth. His sister, Ana Luisa, a teacher, later became a part-time comedic actress as well.

== Entertainment career ==
He started working on radio stations when he was fourteen. At that time, he was employed by radio entrepreneur Tomás Muñiz, then the general manager of WIAC-AM and the father of later producer and actor Tommy Muñiz. When Esther Palés was sick and had to miss an episode of El colegio de la Alegría, Muñiz saw Agrelot and decided to recruit him for the show after inquiring if he could play a child. During this period, Agrelot developed his first comedic character, Torito Fuertes, a mischievous eight-year-old for a family comedy show sponsored by Borden, Inc. and its evaporated milk (the name Torito Fuertes was a pun on "strong calf", a desirable consequence of drinking good milk). His performance was well met by the public and he became a fixture in the program.

Agrelot completed a bachelor's degree in arts and a degree in political sciences and economy, wishing to become a lawyer. However, while he managed to get a job he made appearances in radio stations. The character later took a life of his own on a radio show, first named El Profesor Colgate (sponsored by Colgate-Palmolive's flagship toothpaste) and later called El Colegio de la Alegría (The School of Joy). This program featured Tommy Muñiz as the schoolteacher of a rather dysfunctional classroom.

Muñiz would systematically instruct Agrelot in his role of the teacher, which he would later say was an enjoyable experience. Agrelot was bored with script memorization and instead tried to place cardboards with lines in the set, but would often become too involved in his presentation to notice the cues and would instead resort to improvisation. In La taberna India, Agrelot played don Elpidio and Cordero Reguerete. The differences between both mediums meant that only Agrelot and Roberto Pérez Navarro had moved from radio to television with Muñiz to perform as Socrates Toflón, leaving several vacants for the adaptation of El colegio de la alegría. Faced with a limited budget, Muñiz would take the role of Professor Colgate that had been interpreted by Agrelot and reassigned his protégé to the character of Torito, but scripting with limited personnel was difficult.

El Imparcial, a mainstream newspaper, would re-use the show in a comic-strip adaptation. Seeking new talents, Muñiz recruited his brother Andy, former WIAC employee Carmen Belén Richardson was brought to him by Néstor and Gloria María Negrón was recruited after casually participating in a comedy sketch with Horacio Olivo. With the new acquisitions, the roles where established with Torito, Teresita Comemás, Sócrates, Lirio Blanco, Amapola del Camino and Primitivo Vale Cuatro as students, Muñiz as the professor and Ana Mercedes Agrelot as the principal. Armando Galán y Figura would later take the role of principal. Additional actors played the parents of the students. El colegio de la alegria became a hit and afterwards, it would be staged throughout Puerto Rico.

By 1958, Agrelot had founded a business where chickens and eggs were sold, with local television becoming increasingly dependent on foreign kinescopes. The characters of Elpidio and Reguerete migrated to Garata deportiva where they represented the Criollos de Caguas and Cangrejeros de Santurce, while Rivera defended the Senadores de San Juan and Miró the Indios de Mayagüez. Agrelot eventually requested that the character be renamed to "Cholito", which Muñiz granted. That season the Criollos won the championship, establishing the character. With the end of the baseball season, the show was reworked into El chiste camel, with the cast remaining the same. With time, Agrelot would tone down elements of the character to make it more similar to his real personality.

In 1961, Agrelot would star in Amílcar Tirado's comedy El gallo pelón for public division DIVEDCO, portraying a conflict with a mayor that failed to fulfill his promises. The political undertones of the film were not well received by the government and was retired until WIPR-TV aired it years later. In 1967, El special Corona was created around Agrelot, who developed a military character known as Manteca for the segment. He also performed in the comedy segment La comedia histórica, where he would interpret several historic figures. During this time, Agrelot performed as a DJ in Muñiz's radio station (Radio Luz), filmed the midday segments and Desafiando a los genios and La comedia histórica. On January 5, 1970, Ja-ja, ji-ji, jo-jo con Agrelot was introduced to replace El special de Corona, which was eventually moved to the primetime slot on Sundays and went on to figure near the top of the ratings for almost a decade.

When Producciones Tommy Muñiz moved to Cadena Pérez Perry, Agrelot received a homage from his former co-workers and was even allowed to mention his move to Telecadena Pérez Perry. There, Agrelot was placed in charge of the comedy Cosas del alcalde. With a loose concept, Los siete del Siete would take over the prime-time slot on Thursdays, and be hosted by a number of local talents, including Agrelot, Morales, Olivo, Avellanet, Jovet and Logroño. He was among several figures, including Los Gamma, that participated in the inauguration of Súper Siete following the sale of the channel.

In 1991, Agrelot made his dramatic debut in the Muñiz miniseries Nadie lo va a saber. For the 40th anniversary of Puerto Rican television, TeleOnce aired a special, titled 40 Kilates de Televisión, produced by Rafo Muñiz in which he made an appearance. In 1994, he appeared in Rafo Muñiz's special, ¿A quién no le falta un tornillo?. On September 3, 1995, he made a return to the role in a special edition of El colegío de la alegría, titled Cuarenta años no son na', reprising his role. On February 3, 1997, he participated in Los 75 años de don Tommy, a special dedicated to Muñiz's career. On September 7, 1998, WIPR-TV began airing Noches de ayer, where Muñiz introduced episodes of his past work. The show would later be renamed Imagines and be hosted by Agrelot as well.

Disappointed at the status of the industry and the proliferation of lowbrow comedy, Muñiz entered a semi-retirement and spent most of his days at Culebra. Eventually, Rafo Muñiz approached him about a return to the theatre with a play, named Los muchachos de la alegría, which was accepted and Morales was brought in to direct and as part of the cast. Agrelot was initially considered to lead the cast, but his issues with scripted work lead to the reconciliation of Muñiz and Cordero after two decades of estrangement. The play was a hit and moved from Bellas Artes to Teatro Tapia and then left San Juan to be shown at Mayagüez and Ponce, totaling over thirty shows.

== Shows ==
Apart from appearances in numerous commercials, Agrelot's credits in Puerto Rican television include:

- La Criada Malcriada (The Rude Maid)
- El Especial de Corona (The Corona Special)
- Desafiando a los Genios (Challenging the Geniuses), a personal favorite of Pablo Casals
- Haciendo Historia (Making History)
- El Show del Mediodia (The Midday Show, as Don Cholito, another legendary character of his)
- Parece Increible (It Seems Incredible)
- Ja ja, Ji ji, Jo jo con Agrelot

== Exhibition-boxing record ==
1 fight	1 win	0 losses
By knockout	1	0

No.	Result	Record	Opponent	Type	Round, time	Date	Location	Notes
1	Win	1–0	(United States) Muhammad Ali	KO	?	Feb 6, 1976	Cancha Pepin Cestero, Bayamón, Puerto Rico	

== Comedic characters ==
Agrelot created the following characters:

- "Don Pulula", a mild mannered evangelical pastor with a proclivity for mild double entendres (he modeled his voice after that of Rafael Quiñones Vidal, a Puerto Rican television host),
- "Mario Trauma", a crazed mental patient who constantly screamed in falsetto and was in reality saner than the people around him (he modeled his voice after a floor coordinator at WAPA-TV),
- "Pasión", an old maid desperately looking for male company,
- "Serafín Sin Fin y Sin Meta", an effeminate man with a heart-shaped birthmark in his cheek (while claiming that Serafín was not a homosexual and never made a pass to anyone during the character's run, Agrelot faced protests from the local chapter of GLAAD and discontinued the character)
- "Soldado Manteca", an inept Beetle Bailey-like character who was part of the United States Army (Agrelot described him once as Torito Fuertes, all grown up)
- "Cerebrito Ligón", a man who claimed to be a peeping Tom but wouldn't dare to peep. A famous episode had a young Alida Arizmendi, later a Puerto Rican legislator, confronting him while he tried to sneak into an all-female gym;
- "Speedy González", an extremely fast gibberish-talking handyman, who would always charge US$10.00 for his services (later increased to US$20.00 because of inflation). This character was a favorite of Benicio del Toro's.
- "Don Remigio Rodríguez y Rodriguez", an almost catatonic, extremely frank businessman (and the owner of Rodríguez y Rodriguez Sociedad en Comandita) who had a proclivity for face gestures and sticking out his tongue. He had a standing feud with Joaquín, the Spanish-born store owner across the street (played by Spanish actor Ricardo Fabregues), to whom he constantly insulted ("¡Joaquín, pillo!") Don Rodríguez later starred in Sunshine Logroño's film, "Chona, La Puerca Asesina"
- El Juez, a character modeled after Pigmeat Markham and Sammy Davis Jr.'s "Here Come Da Judge" character (more Davis's than Markham's) who had a huge mallet and would use it against a defendant's head if necessary during trials
- Don Segismundo, the mayor of Trujillo Bajo, a fictional municipality in Puerto Rico (Agrelot said once that Segismundo was actually Don Rodríguez y Rodríguez turned public servant)
- "Pancho Matanzas", a Cuban immigrant that, as many did at the time, would sell anything to support himself and his family.
- "Juan Macana", a not-very-bright police officer, PRPD badge number 13,378 who popularized in Puerto Rico a phrase Agrelot constantly heard in Mexico during one of his tours: "Sí, ¿cómo no?" ("Yeah, why not?")

Agrelot would also parody famous characters from cinema in his comedy program, Ja Ja, Ji Ji, Jo Jo Con Agrelot. His most-famous parody was that of Marlon Brando as Vito Corleone in The Godfather movie trilogy.

Agrelot appeared as Padre Ambrosio, a priest, in Jacobo Morales's Dios Los Cria II. He also played a serious dramatic role in a television miniseries, Nadie lo va a saber, in 1991.

== See also ==
- List of Puerto Ricans
