= Carmen Belén Richardson =

Puerto Rican actress (1930–2012)

- Born: September 14, 1930; Santurce, Puerto Rico
- Died: August 9, 2012 (aged 81); Caguas, Puerto Rico
- Occupation: Actress
- Years active: 1954–2012

Carmen Belén Richardson (September 14, 1930 − August 9, 2012) was a Puerto Rican actress and comedian. After beginning in radio, Richardson migrated to television along the rest of the cast for El Profesor Colgate, which proved successful in the Thursday night time slot. She also acted as a comedian in other shows such as La Criada Malcriada in the role of Jazmín, Hogar Dulce Hogar as María Antonieta de los Ángeles Monroig López and in Esto No Tiene Nombre. In Esto No Tiene Nombre, she made comical imitations of many personalities. Among those who she imitated were Angela Davis and Roberta Flack. A new opportunity, outside of comedy, presented itself when the local television stations once again began to produce telenovelas. Among the soap operas in which she participated are Anacaona (as "Belén"), El Idolo (as "Caridad Carvajal"), Rojo Verano (as "Sor Teresa") and Marta Llorens (as "Mamá Luz"). During the 1970s, Richardson worked in comedies Black Power and Ja, ja, ji, ji, jo, jo con Agrelot alongside comedian José Miguel Agrelot. In 1972, she played a supporting role in the telenovela El silencio nos condena.

In 1980, Richardson went to Mexico and was hired by Chilean director Valentin Pimstein, to work in soap operas. During the three years that she spent in Mexico, she acted in El Maleficio (1983), Guadalupe (1984) as "Dominga", Soledad (1981), Amalia Batista (1983) and El Hogar que yo Robe (1981) as "Fernanda". Richardson returned to Puerto Rico and in 1985 went to work in local theater productions. She took part in Cecilia Valdes, Clemente (the musical), Cuando él es Guadalupe, Flor de Pesidio and Sirena. The 1989 Festival of Art "El Cemi" in Puerto Rico was dedicated to her and in recognition of her 40 years in the world of entertainment she was awarded the Carlos Busquets award. Richardson joined Producciones MECA, founded by actresses Camille Carrion and Ángela Meyer. With this new company she actively participated in the following shows and soap operas, Ellas al Mediodia, Ave de Paso (1988), La Isla and Yara Prohibida (1988). Richardson imitated several artists in the theatre presentations of Múltiples ellas.

== Entertainment career ==
=== Early years ===
Richardson was born in Santurce. Her parents felt that she had a special talent for acting at an early age and in 1939 when she was nine years old, they had her audition for a child's role in a radio soap opera on the WNEL radio station. The people at the station were so impressed with her that they hired her on the spot. She attended the Central High School of Santurce where she actively participated in her school plays. On one occasion when she was 14 years old, Juan Ramón Jiménez, the Spanish Nobel Prize winner, was present for one of her presentations. He was impressed by what he saw to the point that he offered to pay Richardson's university tuition. Richardson enrolled at the University of Puerto Rico where she studied Dramatic Arts. She completed her college education and became a teacher of social studies. Richardson also worked as a translator. In 1954, after she graduated, Puerto Rican television pioneer and producer Tommy Muñiz, offered her a role in his new program El Colegio de la Alegria. She played the part of "Lirio Blanco", a funny, extremely tall girl who could open her eyes in amazement extremely wide. Thus, Richardson became the second black Puerto Rican actress in Puerto Rico's television industry, after Rita Delgado, in 1955. Néstor Muñiz was who recommended Richardson to his brother, who was looking for actors to play students in this sketch. Muñiz was skeptical that at such a young age and with a background in drama she was well suited with comedy, but she won the role in an audition. A gesture where she opens her eyes wide was noted by Néstor Muñiz when he visited the radio studio was noted as a potential comedy bit.

In September 1955, she joined the Candilejas theatre troupe led by Edwin Ramírez and Gabriel Ríos, which staged comedies, dances and singing acts at Teatro Tapia. In June 1956, El Profesor Colgate had a special edition for the summer vacation, where Richardson and the rest of the cast appeared in the house of the character Teresita. Her role in the program was positively criticized for its comedic timing, but remained secondary to the main characters played by Agrelot and Muñiz. For Muñiz she also appeared in Hogar Dulce Hogar, with Shorty Castro completing the act as her character's boyfriend. On March 2, 1957, Richardson formed part of the "Día de la Ciudadanía" special that was aired by WKAQ-TV's Súper Show. On June 17, 1961, Richardson married Miguel Ángel Flores, with whom she had two daughters (Migbel and Edda). The couple also had an adoptive daughter named Waleska Robles, whom they adopted five years before having children of their own. For the first four years of her marriage she did not work in the arts, until she replaced Velda González in La criada malcriada while pregnant of her first daughter.

For most of her career she considered acting a part-time, not taking it as a full-time job until the 1970s. In December 1970, Centro Cultural José Archilla Cabrera sponsored the staging of Réquiem para una mujer (an adaptation of William Faulkner's Requiem for a Nun) at Naranjito, with Richardson joining the cast as "Nancy". The play was organized by the La Comedia Puertorriqueña theatre troupe, led by Sandra Rivera, with screenplay penned by Albert Camus. More showings were sponsored by the Institute of Puerto Rican Culture (ICP) at Toa Alta. During this time, Richardson also joined the cast of Sirena, directed by Dean Zayas and staged at Teatro Tapia as part of the ICP's Festival de Teatro Puertorriqueño. Her performance as "Mamá Dolores" was positively critiqued, due to representing a departure from the play's melodramatic tone and offering a humorous respite. Labor disputes between actors union APATE and Tommy Muñiz Productions, with the lack of work forcing Richardson to leave the producer. She then joined and worked for ASTRA Productions, being employed in the televised programs Ahí va eso and Sin ton ni son.

=== Emphasis on theatre ===
In November 1971, the ICP sponsored a staging of Réquiem para una Mujer at Centro Cultural de Lares, in which she reprised her role. In April 1973, Richardson joined the cast of the play La Vida de San Martín de Porres staged at Teatro Radio City at Santurce. By this time, she was also featured in the comedy Black Power, which aired on the noon slot of WRIK-TV as part of the lineup of Rikavisión. In June 1973, Richardson was added to the supporting cast of the J. Alonso Millán farce comedy La Señora Que No Dijo Sí, produced by Julie Rivera's Compañía de Teatro Universal at Centro Cultural de Mayagüez and Teatro La Perla in Ponce. In February 1973, Richardson also appeared in Alberto González's (also known by his stage name "Machuchal") El Batey de la Alegría as part of a expanded block by Producciones Bayaney. During the summer, the Black Power segment led its time slot in ratings. In July 1973, she was featured as part of the government-sponsored Fiestas del Pueblo Puertorriqueño at Parque Luis Muñoz Rivera. In December 1974, Richardson joined the cast of Gonzalo Roig's zarzuela-operetta Cecilia Valdés, which was sponsored by the Fundación Puertorriqueña de la Zarzuela and staged the University of Puerto Rico. She was given the role of "Abuela Chepilla", which was one of the main supporting characters. Her acting in the play received positive comments from the entertainment press.

In March 1975, Richardson appeared in Rene Muñoz's Easter adaptation El Cristo Negro, which was staged at the Roberto Clemente Coliseum. She was given the role of "Cora", who was the mother of a young priest. In June 1977, Richardson joined the cast of Guerra Menos Guerra Igual a Sexo, an adaptation of Aristophanes' Lysistrata staged at Teatro Tapia. She was given the role of "Cafrica". In August 1977, Richardson was featured in Casa Comerío's cultural 1977-78 season opener, where she presented poetry in various genres, including romance and comedy. In April 1978, she was featured in the television adaptation of Enrique Laguerre's Los Dedos de la Mano, which was sponsored by the ICP with the intention being aired by WKBM-TV and abroad. When Tommy Muñiz moved his programming to that channel from Rilavisión, Richardson was among the talent that joined him.

In July 1978, she joined the cast of La Casa de las Hojas Azules (an adaptation of John Guare's The House of Blue Leaves) staged for charity directed by Dean Zayas and produced by Manuel Fernández Cortines at Teatro Tapia. In March 1979, Richardson joined the filming of WKAK-TV's rustic-theme telenovela Anacaona, forming part of the supporting cast. She was given the role of "Belén", the paternal aunt of the titular character. Richardson later noted that some scenes were filmed at the Dominican Republic because the production did not received permission to film in Haiti, using its neighboring country due to its ethnic similarities. For WKAQ-TV, she also participated in the 25th anniversary special. For the 20th edition of the Festival de Teatro Puertorriqueño at Teatro Tapia, Richardson participated in Epidaurus's adaptation of Luis Torres Nadal's Las Once en Punto y Sereno. In this play she was given the role of a servant. In August 1979, Richardson was featured as part of the cast of WKAQ-TV's telenovela Marta Lloréns, una muchacha del pueblo, written by Sergio Doré. In this show she played the character of "Mamá Lú". In October 1979, she was a guest in El Show de Judy Gordon and Al paso con la juventud. In February 1980, Richardson joined the cast of WKAQ-TV's telenovela Ariana. In October 1980, she was featured as part of the cast for the teleseries Las Almas No Tienen Color for Teleluz.

=== Local and international telenovelas ===
In November 1981, Richardson was included as part of the ensemble in the Mexican telenovela El hogar que yo robé. She was included as part of a talent exchange between WKAQ-TV and Televisa and given the role of "Fernanda". In March 1982, she joined the cast in Emilio Carbadillo's Te Juro Juana Que Tengo Ganas, produced by Lolyn Paz at Centro de Bellas Artes. Her performance was critiqued as "impressive in her exactitude" in a "relatively simple style". During the summer, Richardson was featured in Cuando él… Es Guadalupe, a comedy written by Emilio Huyke and directed by Axel Anderson. In April 1983, she was part of TeleLuz's Mother's Day special Para tí Mamá. Later that year, Richardson joined a showing of the zarzuela El Cafetal held at CBA to commemorate the 20th Anniversary of Ernesto Lecuona's death. After not receiving any offer, she left towards Mexico for another stint after receiving several there. There, Richardson filmed the telenovelas Amalia Batista and Guadalupe. Despite enjoying the experience, she preferred her homeland and returned, staying inactive for eight months. In May 1985, she returned to Puerto Rican television in WKAQ-TV's telenovela Tanairí, set in the Caribbean of the 19th Century. She was given the role of "Mariba", a midwife and curandera. Her performance, taken in tandem with the interpretation of her character's daughter by Alba Nydia Díaz, was critiqued as "confident and outgoing".

When the zarzuela Cecilia Valdés returned in July 1985, Richardson reprised her role as the slave "Chepilla". The play continued its run the following, being staged at CBA. Her performance was critiqued as "very secure and professional". Richardson was among several artists that collaborated in the charity tele-marathon Unidos por Puerto Rico. In February 1986, she joined Ángel del Cerro's telenovela Cadenas de amor, which was headlined by Nydia Caro and which was mostly kept secret leading up to its debut for WKAQ-TV. Richardson was given the character of "Fefa", whose hallucinations were depicted on-screen by a trained Bengal tiger named Numa. The appearance of the 900-pound animal first shocked her, who due to safety reasons filmed the scenes without the rest of the cast and after WKAQ-TV secured insurance for the actress. This was the first time that a Bengal tiger was used in a dramatic role in Puerto Rican television, where they were commonly seen as part of circus acts. Richardson also joined WKAQ-TV's next telenovela, Preciosa. She also made appearances in the weekend variety show Súper Sábado. In March 1987, Richardson joined the musical biographical play Clemente, based on the life of baseball player and philanthropist Roberto Clemente and staged at CBA. She played the role of Luisa Walker del Clemente, the athlete's mother.

=== Ellas in television and theatre ===
In May 1987, Richardson was considered to join TeleOnce's noon show Ellas al mediodía. She was officially announced when production company Empresas MECA held its anniversary event at Hotel San Juan. During this time, Richardson reprised her role as "Ña Bárbara" when Pro Arte Lírico de Puerto Rico staged new showings of El Cafetal at Teatro Tapia. In June 1987, she joined the cast of TeleOnce's telenovela La Isla. Richardson was given the role of "Primera Dama", the wife of Coral island's governor. In May 1988, Richardson joined Empresas MECA's next telenovela for TeleOnce, Yara prohibida. She also remained active in theatre, joining a spinoff of Ellas al mediodía titled Múltiples ellas, where she performed impersonations of Ruth Fernández and Whoopi Goldberg. Her singing of Burundanga received positive critique. In February 1989, Richardson joined Juan González's Flor de presidio, a dramatic play that took place in a women's jail. Her performance was critiqued as "establishing her character well". She was also a guest in the show Estos sí son de aquí.

In March 1989, Richardson received the Carlos Busquets Award as part of the V Festival El Cemí at Santurce. The event was dedicated as a homage and she opened it by singing the musical theme El Cemí. In June 1989, Richardson reprised her role at Múltiples ellas II when new showings began at CBA. This time, she interpreted a parody of La Lupe. However, after Ellas al mediodía was cancelled by TeleOnce, they were guests in an episode dedicated to the topic by WKAQ-TV's Fuera de serie. After hurricane Hugo struck Puerto Rico, showings of Múltiples ellas were organized for charity. Richardson was an invited guest in WSJN-TV's Cartelera and Tommy Muñiz's Carcajadas… Y algo más. In December 1989, Richardson joined the special program filmed by WAPA-TV to commemorate its 40th anniversary. In March 1990, Richardson joined Angela Meyer's Las Siete Ellas, a noon show for SúperSiete. For that channel she also filmed an episode of court procedural Sala 303.

== Later years ==
Carmen Belén Richardson retired from acting after being diagnosed with fibromyalgia. She founded a fibromyalgia support group in Puerto Rico called "Fundación Carmen Belén Richardson". On September 3, 1995, she made a return to the role in a special edition of El Colegío de la Alegría titled Cuarenta años no son na' reprising his role. On February 3, 1997, she participated in Los 75 años de don Tommy, a special dedicated to Muñiz's career. Richardson died on August 9, 2012, at HIMA hospital in Caguas, Puerto Rico at the age of 81. She was buried at Borinquen Memorial Park in Carolina, Puerto Rico. Richardson had two biological daughters: Migbel and Eda; and an adoptive daughter: Waleska.

== Personal life ==
In May 1986, Richardson labeled herself as a "working mother, like all others" and considered family her foremost priority in life. Despite her career, she still regarded herself as a housewife and went shopping in supermarkets personally. Outside of entertainment, Richardson established a florist and wedding store named Lyrio Blanco, named after her character from Colegio de la Alegría and located at the Jesús T. Piñero Avenue in San Juan. In 1974, she began offering professional-level courses for people interested in becoming florists at her local. She also organized an academy of manual arts. By the 1980s, both of these businesses had ceased to function.

Richardson was an activist against social prejudice and racism throughout her life, something that she expressed pride in. In her view, vestiges of slavery continued present in modern society, this time as emotional attacks and unmotivated contempt against black people. She believed that talent was able to overcome these hurdles. Despite playing several epoch roles where she was a slave, Richardson always opposed to play a submissive slave. She also noted that black actors were often stereotyped as servants and butlers, which she believed was a form of prejudice itself. Richardson noted her belief that she was a rebellious woman, only recognizing the authority of God and firmly separating it from professional courtesy and respect. Among her comedy characters was a homage of Angela Davis.

In life, Richardson practiced the Puerto Rican variant of spiritism known as Espiritismo. She noted that she was impressed by a voodoo ritual that was featured in the telenovela Anacaona, which was real and took three hours to complete, but that she lacked fear during the ceremony due to being previously exposed to Espiritismo. Rafael José held Richardson and Ruth Fernández for paving the way for Afro-Puerto Ricans in the mediatic arts. Liza Lugo also stated that she was responsible for helping her early on.

== See also ==
- List of Puerto Ricans
- List of Puerto Ricans of African descent
- History of women in Puerto Rico
