= Juan Bautista Garcia =

Puerto Rican painter

Juan Bautista Garcia (1904 – May 31, 1974), born Jean Baptiste Romanacce, was a Corsican immigrant to Puerto Rico whose life and family became the inspiration for one of Puerto Rico's most successful television shows in history, Los Garcia.

== Biography ==
Juan Bautista Garcia's father died before he immigrated to Puerto Rico in 1906, at the age of two. Garcia and the rest of his family settled in the southern city of Guayama.

His mother died when Garcia was only eight years old, and Garcia had to begin working to earn a living. His parents were very rich; Garcia as a child could not manage the family's fortune and thus he actually became a homeless person for some time. At the age of thirteen, he got on a vehicle driven by bulls, and arrived in San Juan.

Garcia became a YMCA resident in San Juan. At the YMCA, he learned various skills, such as plumbing, painting and other jobs. Garcia became a noted artist in Puerto Rico's capital, although he never gained national or international fame with his paintings.

Juan Bautista Garcia married Josefina Santiago, with whom he had several children. Soon, he met television and radio producer Tomas Muniz, one of the most well known producers in Puerto Rico then. During the 1940s, Garcia travelled across the island with Mr. Muniz, helping him with the production of concerts, plays, and other events. Sometimes Garcia would help Muniz for free, other times for such goods as animals, and, less often, for money. Eventually, the money he did earn allowed him to buy a residence for him and his family at the Valencia urbanization in Rio Piedras, a large San Juan suburb. Tomas Muniz's sisters became his neighbors at Valencia, and Garcia met Mr. Muniz's son, Tommy Muniz, who also gained a lot of appreciation towards Garcia.

One fact that got Tommy Muniz's attention was that the Garcia's had weekly meetings, held on Sundays, and that sometimes as many as thirty family members would reunite. Rafo Muniz, Tommy Muniz's son, befriended Godofredo Garcia, whose character he would go on to play at the series.

Towards his later years, Garcia was hired by a college in San Juan to paint a mural on its interior. Since Tommy Muniz's children as well as those of Tomas Muniz's adoptive sisters attended that school, Tommy Muniz saw the paintings and he became inspired by them.

As a consequence, the television series, Los Garcia was conceptuated by Muniz and later on, shown on television since 1975, shortly after Juan Bautista Garcia had died. Tommy Muniz played Juan Bautista Garcia in the series.
