= Tomás Muñiz =

Puerto Rican radio and TV producer (1900–1963)

- Born: August 4, 1900; Cabo Rojo, Puerto Rico
- Died: September 8, 1963 (aged 63); Hato Rey, Puerto Rico
- Occupations: radio and television producer

Tomás Domingo Muñiz Souffront (August 4, 1900 – September 9, 1963) was a well known Puerto Rican radio and television producer. He is sometimes respectfully called by the general public in Puerto Rico as Don Tomás Muñiz, to differentiate him from his namesake and son, Tommy Muñiz. As a young man, he worked as a real estate agent, and later as an advertising copy writer -and later executive- of the West Indies Advertising Company (WIAC). He later produced radio shows and administered the agency's radio station, WIAC-AM in San Juan.

Tomás Muñiz was the patriarch of a show business family: one of his seven children, Tommy, is a media legend in Puerto Rico, and his grandson Rafo Muñiz, is also an actor, television producer and music promoter. Yet another grandson, Pedro Muñiz, starred as the father in the 1989 highly acclaimed television sitcom Maripili which he also produced (521 episodes); he is also a film producer. Son Tommy Muñiz Jr. also produced and starred in the only Puerto Rican film ever to be nominated for an Oscar, a 1989 film titled Lo que le Pasó a Santiago ("What happened to Santiago").

== Early life ==
Muñiz was engaged in a number of ventures, including real estate, with mixed results. This resulted in the family moving from one house to another, which did not settle well with Nina. He also distributed metal pools, was an educator and civil leader. Nena Ramírez was sickly and received the assistance of Muñiz when confronted with a medical crisis, often requiring resuscitation. Muñiz was a strict parent, with Nena serving as counterbalance in the case of Tommy, who had a problematic childhood. The couple had several children, Néstor, Tommy, Andy, Marjorie, Nilza, Carmen, Nellie. Besides their children, the family of their nanny a black woman from Santa Isabel, was integrated to their own household with his consent. Muñiz stopped attending the Casino de Puerto Rico, disagreeing with racial segregation rules.

He would often barter what was required in the household in exchange for advertising. Muñiz rented a large house known as "La Casona" from the Abarcas for a low alimony and intending to eventually purchase it, which he used as his personal office and residence along his wife and the four youngest of his children. Nena, however, was uncomfortable in the centenary house which gained a reputation as haunted. Muñiz introduced the Skip It to Puerto Rico.

== Entertainment career ==
In 1933, the first local advertisement company was established under the name of West Indies Advertising Company. Muñiz worked as administrator under the Abarca family, eventually gaining the nickname of "the zar of radio". He was one of the first persons to give José Miguel Agrelot work. He also worked with a large number of other entertainers. His son, Lucas Tomás Muñiz, or Tommy Jr., later became the owner of Teleluz, a major competitor of WAPA-TV and Canal 2. His son, Tommy, began working at WIAC when he was nearing adolescence at the initiative of Félix Muñiz. The arrival of television placed stress on the local radio stations due to a loss of advertisers, which eventually concluded in the disappearance of WIAC with some of the employees of Muñiz becoming employed by Tommy such as receptionist Julita.

Into the 1950s, he and Nena remained living at Calle Duarte in Floral Park. When his son and daughter in law moved a few streets away, Muñiz spent time with his grandchildren and performed a role of counselor to Tommy, who was just entering the nascent television industry. Employing his experience in the media, these conversations served as encouragement to probe different concepts and shows such as a television version of radio hit El colegio de la alegría and S reírse con Ola. He also provided the services of his driver, Elías Rivera, as aid. Muñiz welcomed his son's production company, Producciones Tommy Muñiz, in La Casona where Marjorie and her husband also lived. He also became involved in Néstor's real state firm, Muñiz y Muñiz.

Other television segmentscreated following his encouragement during a conversation with Tommy were Reina por un día and La criada malcriada. During this time, Muñiz also collaborated in helping a poor paperboy that used to work at Parada Catorce in San Juan afford some clothes so he could study.

== Later life ==
In the early 1950s, Nena underwent a surgery, which they were able to cost with the help of a merchant friend named Valentín Álvarez. However, on October 31, 1957, Nena died due to complications of her condition, at the age of 59. Since all of his children lived at Floral Park, Muñiz then began spending time with them more frequently, spending time as a guest in their respective houses and attending his grandchildren.

During this time, he also helped Tommy by presenting him a house and a business at Cayey. In March 1963, Néstor took a reluctant Muñiz to Auxilio Mutuo Hospital after experiencing discomfort. His other children visited him during his stay and, initially, he received a good prognosis and was only diagnosed with an ulcer. However, days later he suffered a massive heart attack as a consequence of thrombosis and his survival became uncertain. During the following weeks, Muñiz was visited by his former employees and acquaintances and made a Catholic confession. His final day, he was given some oranges by Tommy and accompanied by other members of the family, before dying at the age of 62. Muñiz was buried on April 10, 1963, at Puerto Rico Memorial cemetery.

== See also ==
- List of Puerto Ricans
