= Los García =

Puerto Rican television sitcom

- Created by: Tommy Muñiz
- Starring: Tommy Muñiz; Gladys Rodríguez; William Gracia; Manela Bustamante; Rafo Muñiz; Gina Beveraggi; Edgardo Rubio
- Country of origin: Puerto Rico

Production
- Running time: 30 minutes each episode.

Original release
- Network: WAPA-TV Channel 4
- Release: 1975 – 1981

Los García was a Puerto Rican television sitcom from the 1970s. First shown weekly on WAPA-TV, and later on TeleIsla (then called WRIK-TV, Rikavision Channel 7), it depicted the life of a local fictional family, as well as that of some of their neighbors. The series' characters were based (and even named after) real individuals. It was the best-rated television program in Puerto Rico in three (or five, depending on which source is quoted) out of the six years of the program's run. It is still aired in re-runs by the local Puerto Rico community channel for DirecTV.

== Origins ==
Tommy Muñiz had a stream of radio productions in the late 1940s and 1950s, the most successful of which were family-oriented comedies. The two most successful ones, La Familia Pérez and Gloria y Miguel, featured comedic variations on real-life stories about married couples, essentially premiering sitcoms in Puerto Rico. When local television stations started their broadcasts in 1954, Muñiz tried the formula in two productions: Hogar, dulce hogar in the late 1950s, and a television version of Gloria y Miguel in the mid-1960s. Since broadcasts were live, and airings were frequent, Muñiz, who was the writer for these programs as well, felt that the family sitcom format was quite challenging to sustain. He felt slightly burned out by the time each program had run its course, and was quite reluctant to pursue the formula further.

By the time his production company experienced a strike in 1973, Muñiz felt compelled to abandon television productions altogether. He remained as executive producer for various comedies, particularly those featuring José Miguel Agrelot, and had various other businesses to fall back to, but he had lost the desire to write and produce. As his other businesses fell in hard times, coinciding with an economic recession in Puerto Rico, he was repeatedly urged by family and peers to try producing yet another family sitcom, a tried-and-true formula that, they considered, would involve little risk. He reluctantly agreed, and when no actor was available to play the main role, he took a gamble and decided -against his own wishes- to star in the comedy as well.

== Jean Baptiste Romanacce, the real "Juan Bautista García" ==
When Tommy Muñiz first sketched his new production, he intended the starring role to reflect an everyday man from Puerto Rico. The man who served as the main inspiration for the role had not been born in the island country. Tomás Muñiz, Tommy's father and a famous producer in his own merit, had met Jean Baptiste Romanacce-García, a Corsican immigrant whose name was adapted into Juan Bautista García, a Spanish-sounding name, upon his arrival to Puerto Rico in 1906. García was a self-made man who thrived after his orphaned childhood and became a handyman and freelance set designer for Puerto Rico's television stations. He was also known in the island country for having fathered ten children, adopting three more, and somehow managing the entire tribe. After using García's services often through the years, Tommy Muñiz (himself the father of eight children) befriended García. In turn, Rafo Muñiz, Tommy Muñiz's son, was a childhood friend of García's grandson, Roberto, who in turn was the son of Rodofreddo (also known as Roberto) García.

Tommy Muñiz was inspired by the decorations that García had done at the Parroquia Espíritu Santo -the neighborhood church near Muñiz's household,- and came with the idea of dedicating a television show to the García family. Based on this, Tommy's character became Juan Bautista García, and Rafo Muñiz's character was Godofredo, a young neighbor (a twist on Rodofreddo's name). The real García died on June 1, 1975, just before the series went on the air.

== The cast ==
Casting for the series was fortuitous, as were many production details. While Tommy was writing his scripts, his son Rafael (Rafo), who had played the family's son in the television version of "Gloria y Miguel", asked to play Godofredo -the role demanded a cheeky, wisecracking teenager, and although Rafo was already in his twenties, he felt he could play it. Juan Bautista needed a daughter -who would be Godofredo's girlfriend, and mutual family friends referred Gina Beveraggi, who had no previous stage experience, to Muñiz. He ended up naming the character Ginny, after Gina's real name. Mutual references also contacted Manela Bustamante, a very successful Cuban-born comedian, famous for her role of Cachucha in Cuban radio and television. to play Doña Toni, a fast-talking, nosy neighbor. Muñiz asked a neighbor, William Gracia -also with no acting experience- to play Don Pepín, another nosy neighbor. Liberato Garced Rodriguez was originally cast as Juan, Jr., better known as Junito. Garced was later replaced by Edgardo Rubio, (the son of United States Medal of Honor recipient Euripides Rubio), who would later on achieve fame in WAPA-TV's Barrio Cuatro Calles, and later played comedic roles in Spanish-language television in Florida. Rubio also made his television acting debut as a cast member of Los García.

Muñiz's staff then recruited Gladys Rodríguez, a former child- and later internationally known dramatic actress, for the role of Teresa García Albano, Pablo's wife. She had come out of semi-retirement by the time the series' pilot was filmed, after playing various major dramatic roles around Latin America. Muñiz felt too old for the role (Muñiz was 54 and Rodríguez was 33 at the time) and didn't feel his acting skills could match Rodriguez's, but they both felt an instant connection, right from the beginning. Their acting chemistry was such that many years later, when Jacobo Morales cast his Academy Award nominated film Lo que le pasó a Santiago, he selected Muñiz for the main role and Rodriguez as his romantic interest.

In rather unusual fashion, Muñiz wrote the series' scripts less rigidly than in his previous productions, giving the characters more flexibility to ad lib (in part because some scripts had been recycled from Gloria y Miguel but would otherwise sound dated). Ad libbing would sometimes have its consequences, since the show was taped but otherwise acted live and not edited: in one episode Rodríguez called Doña Toni by Manela's name and all actors -including Bustamante- had to refrain from cracking up a laugh.

The Garcia's lived in Parque Florido, a Spanish translation of "Floral Park", the San Juan neighborhood where Muñiz lived (Raúl Juliá lived a short distance from the Muñizes). The character's names, for the most part, were literally taken from Muñiz's (and the real Juan Bautista García's) neighbors as well.

The fortuitous nature of the show's assembly extended to its theme "song", a hodgepodge of four musical selections, the two most notable of which were mashed-up versions of the Champ Boys' funked-up version of Mike Oldfield's Tubular Bells, and an instrumental version of Donna Summer's Love to Love You Baby -or, more precisely, its bass line, which is common to both songs.

== The characters ==
Juan Bautista García lived with his family in a fictional neighborhood called "Parque Florido", with his wife Teresa, and his children, straight-as-an-arrow teenage daughter Ginny and impish tween (later teen) Junito. Juan had already reached middle age, and was prematurely portrayed as a "grumpy old man". As such, he was constantly looking for occasions where he could relax and not be bothered by life's everyday stresses. However, he would inevitably be bothered by his interaction with many of the cast members. His pet peeves were three neighbors: Godofredo, his daughter's slacker boyfriend; Don Pepín, the bossy, meddling neighbor sharing a fence with the Garcías, and Doña Toni, an ever-present neighbor who would make rounds around the neighborhood to observe people (and eventually gossip about them). Juan, however, would make a fuss about everything, particularly how much was owed to the neighborhood's newspaper boy.

Maintaining Juan's sanity and order at the household was Teresa's full-time job. She pressed Juan (sometimes angrily or hysterically, for comic effect) to do household chores, correct mistakes, or solve misunderstandings. Many of these were caused by Juan's absent-mindedness, Don Pepín's uncalled for interventions, or Juan's reliance on Godofredo (who would inevitably screw things up). Junito would also play practical jokes on the family, which almost always backfired.

Plots revolved around everyday tasks such as: who ended up raking leaves in the backyard (and how inevitably it ended up not being done), the (messy) outcome of changing the family car's oil, or a neighbor borrowing a ladder (with or without alerting Juan first). Juan would sometimes cause mischief on purpose: in an episode the family visited a Middle Eastern restaurant and Juan let himself be dragged backstage by a belly dancer (with a grin in his face), while Teresa loudly protested.

Not too many details were given about Juan's job, although it was implied that he was an insurance clerk (William Gracia was an insurance salesperson in real life). Actor Carlos Bethel appeared occasionally in the program as Juan's boss. Teresa was a full-time housewife.

A common practice in the program was for Juan, Don Pepín (and very rarely, Doña Toni) to break the fourth wall and talk directly to the camera. Don Pepín did this most often. He would constantly explained why he, the always well-intentioned neighbor, would need to correct some household situation at the Garcías' (and, almost always, without them even knowing it). His nosy attitude was a source of comedic conflict with his domineering wife, Rebecca (occasionally played by Valentina Rivera). Doña Toni, on the other hand, would sometimes start talking extremely fast (a skill that she had perfected while playing her Cachucha character in Cuba). For comic effect, she sometimes ranted to her husband Victor (played by yet another acquaintance of the production staff with no acting experience) without even letting him say a word, and then chastising him ("¡Cállate, Victor", or "Shut up Victor!") when he attempted to speak (it was implied that conversations at Doña Toni's household were monologues most of the time). In one memorable episode Victor told her loudly to shut up, to her surprise.

== Los García becomes a smash hit ==
Los García is considered by many Puerto Rican television critics to be among the best comedy shows in Puerto Rican history. The show began in 1975, quickly becoming a public favorite. The show ran until the early 1980s. It topped local television ratings for at least three of the six seasons in which it ran.

Phrases from the program became cultural references. Besides Doña Toni's "¡Cállate, Victor!", Tommy Muñiz made the phrase ¡Sea mi vida gris! (Loosely translatable to Damned be my life!), which he mentioned every time his character got mad for some reason, a trademark of his during this show. Most famous of all was an exchange between Teresa and Junito. Whenever Teresa got frustrated to the point of hysteria with Juan, she'd scream his name three times ("¡Juan, Juan, Juan!"). Junito, mocking her for sounding like a drag racing car engine revving up when she went frantic, would inevitably respond: ¡Chíllala, Mami, chíllala!, which would loosely translate to: "Peel out, Mom, peel out!". Teresa's trademark scream even became part of the title of one of the biography books about Muñiz, "¡Juan, Juan, Juan...! Crónicas de la televisión en los tiempos de Don Tommy", written by Beba García.

== Juan García, The Widower ==
During the five years through which she played Teresa García, Gladys Rodríguez received various offers to play dramatic roles in telenovelas. She turned these down until the offers were too good to let go. Eventually she felt compelled to leave Los García; as to give Rodríguez a credible exit, her character was made to pass away, making Juan Bautista García a widower. Juan Bautista then became a "happy widower"; various episodes described his convoluted love life, as well as his nosy neighbors' attempts to convince Juan to act his age. However, ratings dipped soon after: Puerto Rican audiences were not used to see Juan García as a bachelor.

Juan Bautista was then set to marry again, this time with a co-worker, Clarissa López, played by Venezuelan actress Marisela Berti, (the wife of singer Chucho Avellanet at the time). Clarissa had a domineering mother, Altagracia (played by Ana Luisa Agrelot, José Miguel Agrelot's sister, and a comedic actress in her own right), who considered that her daughter was getting too old to get married. However, Altagracia also felt Juan Bautista was too old for her.

In a special one-hour episode, Juan Bautista married Clarissa at the family's house in Parque Florido. Various parallel stories played out during the episode: the appearance of Clarissa's absent father Clodomiro (played by José Miguel Agrelot), who Altagracia deeply resented; the appearance of Teresa as a poltergeist dressed in a wedding gown, playing pranks at the wedding, and Pepín's indiscreet gossiping being openly resented by his wife, Rebecca.

== Aftermath ==
A strike by some of channel 7's actors, by then owned by Tommy Muñiz, affected the show. Increased competition in the show's 7 p.m. time slot from other channels that showed telenovelas during the same hour also affected the show.

After the end of Los García's successful run, the members of the show went on to do other things: Rafo Muñiz quit acting for a while, returning sporadically to the profession that first gave him popularity, but he became a successful show producer, representing many singers in Puerto Rico with his Promotores Latinos company. In 1989, he produced a version of MTV's Remote Control, but the United States network threatened to sue and the show was taken off the air. Edgardo Rubio had a productive career as an actor. Gladys Rodríguez, who left the show before it ended, went on to star in many telenovelas and some comedy shows as well as the 1982 feature film Una Aventura Llamada Menudo, and, in 1989, she and Tommy Muñiz reunited to play another romantic couple, in Jacobo Morales' film, Lo que le Pasó a Santiago, which was nominated for an Oscar for Best Foreign Film.

== 2006 Los Garcia Reunion TV Special ==
On Saturday, June 17, 2006, Los García reunited for a prime time special aired on Telemundo entitled "El Reencuentro" as a homage to series creator Tommy Muñiz. The plot revolved in the birth of Ginnita's son. Ginnita is Juan and Teresa's granddaughter; Ginny and Godofredo's daughter.

"We were in first place for six years in Puerto Rican television because the people identified themselves with the family relationship we portrayed. All families have a neighbor like 'don Pepín' and a son-in-law like 'Godofredo'. These aspects of the story transcended in the audience" said Gladys Rodríguez, who praised Muñiz's figure. "Don Tommy motivates us to do the best. He's a genius. He wrote the scripts, created our characters, acted with us and directed us. He deserves a homage like this one".

The cast included Gina Beveraggi, William Garcia, Edgardo Rubio, Christie Miró, Edgar Cuevas and Rafo Muñiz.
