= Manela Bustamante =

Cuban actress

Manela Bustamante (Manuela Bustamante; November 14, 1924 in Havana, Cuba – February 12, 2005 in San Juan, Puerto Rico) was a famous Cuban actress, who performed the character Cachucha in perhaps the most remembered Cuban comedy show of its era “Cachucha y Ramón” (1955-65 approx.). She later became a household name in Puerto Rico during the 70s as she became part of the cast in the show Los García.

== Early years ==
Manela was the only daughter of Spanish immigrants; her father was the owner of a guesthouse in Havana but lost the business during the depression of the 1930s. After finishing her basic education at age 20, Manela embarked to pursue her desire to make a living in the entertainment world. She toured around Latin America in a theatre company and worked for the Cuban radio station CMQ as a singer and story narrator.

== Television career ==
=== Cachucha y Ramón ===
Manela became a famous TV star in the mid-1950s with her character of “Cachucha” in the TV comedy “Cachucha y Ramon” together with co-star, Idalberto Delgado as “Ramon”. The show (mostly live), originally produced by Francisco Vergara and sponsored by Uncle Ben's rice, grew in popularity from the mid 1950s to the mid 1960s. In a trip to N.Y. Manela appeared in a Garry Moore show, as his show was also sponsored by Uncle Ben's rice.

After Cuba fell to communism in 1959, Francisco Vergara left Cuba to sell the idea of the show to other Latin American countries. It is known that a copy of the show, its same title, and characters was done in Venezuela at the same time the original show was still running in Cuba.

== Exile, Los Garcia ==
The show ended when Manela Bustamante went empty handed into exile with her family. After leaving Cuba in 1971, she lived in Spain for three years, and moved to Puerto Rico in 1974. In Spain, Manela put her artistic career on hang; it was her husband that became able to provide the main monetary income for the family as an architect. In Puerto Rico, Manela Bustamante became “Doña Tony” in the popular TV show “Los Garcia”, produced by Tommy Muñiz. She also did several commercials including a small role in the 1988 soap opera “Ave de Paso.”

Her last TV appearance was in 2004 as a special guest in a one-hour tribute to “Los Garcia”. Manela Bustamante died a year later in San Juan, Puerto Rico, on February 12, 2005, and is survived by her daughter and two grandsons.

== See also ==
- List of Cubans
