= Marian Pabón =

Puerto Rican actor, singer and comedian

Marian Pabón Catala (born c. 1958 in San Juan, Puerto Rico) is a Puerto Rican actress. She also had some success as a singer and recording artist.

== Biography ==
Pabón grew used to life in the spotlight: her father, Mario Pabón (San Pedro de Macorís, 1930–San Juan, 1996), was one of Puerto Rico’s most famous actors and directors. She was named after him; her family used the name "Marian" as a Female version of "Mario". Her paternal family were wealthy landowners from the Dominican Republic that left the country in the 1940s during the dictatorship of Rafael Trujillo.

Pabón was one of Puerto Rico's most prolific TV actresses when telenovelas were produced there. She was active in these Spanish language soap operas until 1989, when the last great Puerto Rican telenovela was produced.

Pabón also had a long theater career that has spanned over a decade, which started just as Puerto Rican telenovelas were phased out. A fan of musicals, she would also star in the occasional musical play as a singer and dancer (musicals are rarely produced in Puerto Rico, due to the market's relatively small size, which prevents expensive productions from lasting long enough to recoup production costs).

She also became a comedic actress during that period, notably as part of Sunshine Logroño's television productions. Notable among her characters at the time was "Paola", the helper of an incompetent magician who, whenever his magic tricks failed miserably, would always demand that she, who normally wore a form-hugging dress, prance around the stage as to save the act by turning it into a cheesecake display.

At the time, Pabón recorded a solo album. She had two minor hits that earned some airplay on Puerto Rican media: a cover version of Chubby Checker's "Let's Twist Again, and "Se Enteró Tu Mujer" ("Your Wife Now Knows"). The song tells the melodramatic story of the clandestine lover of a cheating husband who has learned that her lover's wife has discovered their affair; she is actually relieved by the discovery. Her deadpanned "...¡Y me alegro!" ("...and I'm happy for it!") is a soundbite on various Puerto Rican radio programs, and has become an audience favorite, perhaps as a local example of camp.

From 1999 until 2006, Pabón starred alongside Rene Monclova, among others, in Sunshine Logroño's television comedy, El Condominio. In this series she portrayed Brenda Q., a very assertive Niuyorican who has turned into a madam after a stint pursuing prostitution as a career. Brenda is weary of her male neighbors, who only perceive her sex appeal and are inevitably drawn to her breasts, and constantly (and angrily) demands that they only stare to her eyes. She has a cousin, Cari, (played by actress Cristina Soler), a nymphomaniac who has a relatively low intelligence quotient and bigger breasts than Brenda Q.'s, and whom she tries to coerce into doing sex acts for money with customers, which Cari would inevitably do rather willingly and not charge for, to Brenda's frustration.

Controversy arose in 2004 over whether that show should be cancelled because Tony Mojena had been the show's original producer, Pabón stuck by Logroño, defending the show as a workhouse for her fellow Puerto Rican co-stars.

Pabón is a full-time stage actress that has been involved in several of San Juan's most important plays of the 1990s and 2000s, and has performed the plays on tour around Puerto Rico. With the possibility of El Condominio disappearing from Puerto Rican television, she also participates in a stage version of the hit TV show, which includes the same actors and characters of the television programs.

Pabón has participated in numerous Puerto Rican films such as Desvío al Paraiso (Wrong Way to Paradise) and Casi Casi. This film was written and directed by her nephews Tony Vallés and Jaime Vallés. She co-starred in this movie with another one of her nephews, Mario Pabón II.

She is one of the most noted musical theatre performers in Puerto Rico having starred as Lola in the San Juan production of Damn Yankees (opposite Roberto Vigoreaux as Joe Hardy), Audrey in Little Shop of Horrors, Sister Mary Leo in the San Juan premiere of Sor-Presas (Nunsense), Roxie Hart in Chicago, and Liliane LaFleur in Nine. She has also appeared in numerous zarzuelas (Spanish operettas). She played Fraulein Kost in the 1995 San Juan production of Cabaret, taking over the lead role of Sally Bowles when the show's star, Ivette Rodriguez, took time off due to illness. In 2006 she played Cassie in the Puerto Rican revival of A Chorus Line. She was diagnosed with cancer in 2022. In March 2024, Marian Pabón announced that she was no longer suffering from cancer.

== Filmography ==
=== Cinema ===
- 1994: Desvío al Paraiso: Police inspector
- 1995: Manhattan Merengue!: Margaret
- 2006: Casi Casi: Principal Richardson
- 2010: Manuela y Manuel: Faraona
- 2013: Broche de Oro: Madre Superiora
- 2016: Pepo Pal Senado: Estela
- 2016: The Vessel: Rosita
- 2017: Broche de Oro: Comienzos: Madre Superiora

=== Programmes ===
- 1980: El ídolo: Teresa
- 1988: Cuqui: Una mujer como tú: Norma

== Theater ==
- Damn Yankees: Lola
- Little Shop of Horrors: Audrey
- Sor-Presas: Sister Mary Leo
- Chicago: Roxie Hart
- Nine: Liliane LaFleur
- Cabaret: Fraulein Kost
- 2006: A Chorus Line: Cassie
- 2008: Los hombres aman a las cabronas: Bárbara

== See also ==
- List of Puerto Ricans
