= Tino García =

Nicaraguan-Puerto Rican actor

- Born: May 26, 1935; Managua, Nicaragua
- Died: September 26, 2015 (aged 80); San Juan, Puerto Rico
- Occupation: actor

Constantino "Tino" García Arguello (May 26, 1935 – September 26, 2015) was a Nicaraguan–Puerto Rican comedy actor who participated in a number of Puerto Rican and Hollywood series and films, including Thunder Island and Bananas.

== Early life and career ==
García was born in Managua, Nicaragua. His father, Constantino García Hernández, was a Puerto Rican from the city of Aguadilla, residing in Nicaragua, and his mother, Eva Arguello Peñalba, was a Nicaraguan from Leon.

In 1936, when Tino was a one year old baby, his family moved to San Juan, Puerto Rico, where Constantino Jr. attended Colegio San José as a teenager, and then the Gordon Military College in Barnesville, Georgia. This led to him being admitted to Georgetown University in Washington, D.C. He traveled to New York City to take directing and producing courses at the local SRT school.

Returning to Puerto Rico, García became a prolific stage actor during the decade of the 1960s, participating in Una Ciguena Con Bigotes (A Mustached Stork) by Emilio Huyke; Rene Marques' La Carreta (The Oxcart); La Pareja Dispareja (The Odd Couple) alongside Elin Ortiz and Yoyo Boing; Cuando El Es Guadalupe (When He Is Guadalupe); La Marquesa Está en Tres y Dos (The Marquess Is Undecided) and the musical El Misterio Del Castillo (The Mystery of the Castle).

García started acting in a television telenovela series named Novelas Fab (after a sponsor detergent brand) on Telemundo Puerto Rico. He appeared in El derecho de nacer (The Right to Be Born), which became a major telenovela hit across Latin America, and Cuando Los Hijos Condenan (When Children Condemn). García moved to Wapa Television to appear in Yo Mate a Una Santa (I Killed a Woman Saint) and Perdon Para Esta Mujer (Forgiveness For This Woman), among others.

Garcia's best known character was a drunken man, "El Borrachito", which he humorously played on many Puerto Rican television shows, including La Taberna India, a show sponsored by India beer, a famous local beer brand. He reprised this role many times over the years, including also on short television sketches.

Late in his career, he appeared in the 2006 Puerto Rican teen comedy movie Casi Casi.

== Personal life and death ==
Garcia was married to Lilliam Catala from 1957 until his death on September 26, 2015. He was buried at the Puerto Rico Memorial Cemetery in Carolina, Puerto Rico. He had six children with her, including motivational speaker/actress Lily García, Eva, Giselle, Tino Jr., Nelly Ann and Ana Cristina.

== See also ==
- List of Puerto Ricans
- List of Nicaraguans
