= René Monclova =

Puerto Rican actor

Félix René Monclova Vázquez (born c. 1959) is a Puerto Rican actor. He is best known for his roles as Eddie in Academy Award nominated film Lo que le pasó a Santiago and as Lolo Bond in critically acclaimed TV sitcom El Condominio.

== Biography ==
Monclova was born with an actor's pedigree as both of his parents, Myrna Vázquez and Félix Monclova, were acting legends in Puerto Rico. His older brother, Eugenio Monclova, is also a well-known actor who co-starred with Martin Sheen in The Vessel (2016 film). His godfather is Puerto Rican author and playwright René Marqués, whom he's named after.

Monclova spent his early childhood watching his family's work in both theater and television and from a young age expressed interest in following his parents' footsteps. When he was 10 years old, Monclova appeared on his first play, an interpretation of Sacrificio en el Monte Moriah, a play authored by René Marqués. Later that year he would appear on another play authored by Marqués, "Un Niño Azul para esa Sombra", working along Marta Romero.

As a teenager, Monclova participated in multiple high school plays and went on to study theater at the University of Puerto Rico, Rio Piedras Campus. He later applied and was accepted into law-school, however he dropped out as by that point he had already become a father and was struggling to make ends meet. He became a full-time theater actor in the late 1970s.

By the early 1980s Monclova had become a well established actor in Puerto Rican theater circles, however he still struggled to find television work, which he felt would provide a more steady income.

In 1989 Monclova starred in Jacobo Morales film Lo que le Pasó a Santiago which received an Oscar nomination. This newfound exposure led to his recruitment into television show "Qué Vacilón" working alongside Puerto Rican comedian Raymond Arrieta, where he remained from 1990 to 1995. In 1992 producer Tony Mojena created a comedy named Los Apartamentos for Telemundo where Monclova was cast as "Lolo Bond", which would become his best known character.

In 1993, Monclova was part of the supporting cast in Rafo Muñiz's play, La vida en un beso, receiving favorable reviews.

While the Los Apartamentos show became an instant hit and established Monclova as a household television star in Puerto Rico for decades to come, his theater acting career also continued to grow. In 1994 however, Mojena decided to cancel the show, and co-producer Sunshine Logroño relauched it on rival network Televicenro under the name El Condominio ("The Condominium"). The entire cast followed Logroño in what would later prove to be very controversial move.

While the actors got to reprise their old characters from Los Apartamentos at El Condominio. Meanwhile, El Condominio became such a hit that Logroño went on to produce a theatrical play of the same name which toured most of Puerto Rico's 78 municipalities. Its reach later expanded into the United States when Televicentro debuted on DirecTV by satellite.

Not long after this move, Mojena sued Logroño for copyright infringement claiming that he owned the characters. Monclova and the rest of the cast backed Logroño, stating that the characters were created and developed by the actors themselves and not Mojena. In 2009 Mojena won the lawsuit and El Condominio was cancelled.

Monclova and the rest of the cast expressed disappointment with this decision in an interview with Luis Francisco Ojeda, and most of them continued working with Logroño on other productions such as Club Sunshine, and Por El Casco De San Juan.

In 2014, he joined Raymond Arrieta and Jorge Castro in the WKAQ-TV sketch comedy, Raymond y Sus Amigos, produced by Tony Mojena.

In 2023, he played as the Announcer in the Dominican comedy-drama feature The Method directed by David Maler.

As of 2024 Monclova remains an active stage actor in the San Juan theater scene. He also does voice acting for radio and television commercials and was the official voice for the Caribbean Cinemas movie theater chain.

== See also ==
- List of Puerto Ricans
- French immigration to Puerto Rico
