= El Condominio =

Puerto Rican sitcom

- Promotional still for El Condominio's rerun on Telemundo Puerto Rico
- Created by: Sunshine Logroño
- Written by: Sunshine Logroño
- Starring: Sunshine Logroño; Efraín López Neris; René Monclova; Marian Pabón; Jorge Castro; Albert Rodríguez; Cristina Soler; Suzette Bacó
- Opening theme: "El Condominio"
- Ending theme: "El Condominio"
- Country of origin: Puerto Rico
- Original language: Spanish
- No. of seasons: 5

Production
- Producer: Sunshine Logroño
- Running time: 30 minutes

Original release
- Network: WAPA-TV
- Release: March 2000 – June 1, 2005

El Condominio (transl. The Condominium) was a Puerto Rican television sitcom created, written and produced by Emmanuel "Sunshine" Logroño that aired on Televicentro Puerto Rico from March 2000 until June 2005. The show came under controversy in 2004 when Tony Mojena filed a copyright violation lawsuit against Logroño, for taking the storyline and characters (in which the Condominio cast originally portrayed in) of a segment titled 20 Pisos de Historia from a show that Mojena produced on Telemundo Puerto Rico. Ultimately, Mojena gained the copyright of the show, and currently airs on reruns on Telemundo Puerto Rico.

== History ==
El Condominio came to be as a result of a segment in 20 Pisos de Historia, a show produced by Tony Mojena which first appeared on Puerto Rican television on WKAQ-TV as part of De Noche con Sunshine. While working in the Mojena show, the cast and creators resigned and joined Logroño to produce El Condominio, a 30-minute sitcom for WAPA-TV with the same characters and a similar premise, and new characters added. The show, which was aired live in front of a studio audience, became an instant hit in Puerto Rican television, often appearing among the top 10 shows in Puerto Rico on Nielsen's list of television show ratings.

=== Controversy ===
In 2004, controversy arose when Tony Mojena declared that he wanted the show suspended or for Logroño to pay him royalties, alleging, in a lawsuit, that he stole his creation by implanting the original actors and characters used on Los Apartamentos to El Condominio. A court ruling ordered Logroño to continue on producing the show without paying Mojena royalties until the case was further reviewed.

The controversy was spread on Puerto Rican media, and the show's actors sided with Logroño, defending their show as a workshop for Puerto Rican actors. Among the show's most vocal defenders were two of its main stars, René Monclóva and Marian Pabón. In May 2005, the Puerto Rican court reached a verdict, deciding that the show could no longer go on. The show aired its final episode on June 1, 2005. Shortly after the sitcom ended, the show's actors filed a legal motion to allow the actors to portray their characters from El Condominio; most of the characters then appeared in another show called Por el Casco de San Juan.

In the summer of 2012, Tony Mojena received the copies of the show as a result of winning the lawsuit and started airing the show again on Telemundo Puerto Rico, causing the actors to revive the case, stating that even though Mojena owned the show, he did not create the characters and had to pay the actors. After the actors said they were going to plead the case to the Screen Actors Guild, Mojena stated that the show was clear for airing and he was going to keep the show on the air every Sunday at 8pm AST on Telemundo

== Synopsis ==
The show follows the intertwining lives of the tenants and residents of the Monte Brisas condominium, owned by Cardona, a lonely man in his forties who is never seen on camera, apparently a virgin, and had bad luck with women. He inherited the property from his mother (sometimes played by Sunshine Logroño), an elderly woman who raised her son like a momma's boy. Because he had such bad luck with women, the owner befriended his employee Lolo Bond (played by René Monclova), an alcoholic handyman who had much better luck with women. Lolo sometimes felt that his boss may be gay without his own knowledge, so he tried to arrange dates for him, and, combined with the owner's virginal behavior and Lolo's suspicions, this often lead to comical situations.

Throughout the show, many tenants and residents of the building interact with each other, mostly getting into comical mischief, and misunderstandings. Vázquez (played by Efraín López Neris), is the building's ignorant security guard who interacts with the tenants and visitors as they pass through his desk in the lobby. Lolo's girlfriend, Doña Laura Álvarez Viuda de Gumbia (played by Cristina Soler), is a widow, whose husband only left her debts and an unemployed gay son, León (played by Logroño). Segismundo Alberto (played by Jorge Castro), is the building's bossy administrator who often attempts to set order in the condominium. Among the other tenants and residents of the condominium are: Brenda Q (played by Marian Pabón) a Nuyorican hustler who lives on the revenues made by a naïve, big-chested exotic dancer; Dr. Sebastián Argüelles (played by Albert Rodríguez), a biased plastic surgeon with a snooty attitude; Doña Soto (played by Suzette Bacó), an old born-again Christian lady who owned dozens of stray dogs; Elpidio (played by Logroño), a mentally-challenged man-boy; and Pachango (also played by Logroño), a perverted and smelly old man with a hernia.

== Cast ==
Cast of El Condomino (L–R): Jorge Castro as Segismundo Alberto, René Monclova as Lolo Bond, Sunshine Logroño as Pachango, Suzette Bacó (center top) as Doña Soto, Efraín López Neris (seated center) as Vázquez, Cristina Soler as Doña Laura Álvarez Viuda de Gumbia, Marian Pabón as Brenda Q, an unidentified character and Albert Rodríguez as Dr. Sebastián Argüelles.

- Sunshine Logroño as:
  - Elpidio, a mentally-challenged man-boy
  - Pachango, a perverted and smelly old man with a hernia
  - León, the unemployed gay son of Doña Laura
- Efraín López Neris as Vázquez, the building's security guard
- René Monclova as Lolo Bond, the alcoholic handyman
- Marian Pabón as Brenda Q, a Nuyorican hustler
- Jorge Castro as Segismundo Alberto, the building's administrator
- Albert Rodríguez as Dr. Sebastián Argüelles, a snooty plastic surgeon
- Cristina Soler as Doña Laura Álvarez Viuda de Gumbia, Lolo's girlfriend and mother of León
- Suzette Bacó as Doña Soto, an old born-again Christian lady who owned dozens of stray dogs
