= Casi casi =

2006 film by Jaime Vallés, Tony Vallés

- Directed by: Jaime Vallés; Tony Vallés
- Written by: Jaime Vallés; Tony Vallés
- Produced by: Jaime Vallés; Tony Vallés
- Starring: Marian Pabón; Mario Pabón II; Irene Lucio; Fernando Castro - Álvarez; Alexis Arce; Ricardo Arias; Marisa Gómez; Maite Cantó; Manuel Benítez; Albert Rodríguez; Tino García
- Release dates: March 2006 (San Diego Latino Film Festival); 2007
- Running time: 93 minutes
- Country: Puerto Rico
- Language: Spanish

Casi casi (lit. 'Almost Nearly') is a 2006 Puerto Rican film written and directed by brothers Jaime and Tony Vallés. It was released in Puerto Rico in early 2007.

The film takes place in a Catholic school in Puerto Rico, where the main character, Emilio, is infatuated with Jacklynne, the most popular girl in school. In an attempt to impress her and win her over, he decides to run for Student Council President, only to discover that Jacklynne herself will be his adversary. Emilio then devises a plan, together with his friends, to rig the election and lose on purpose. However, they have to avoid being caught by the strict Principal Richardson (Marian Pabón).

== Plot ==
Emilio is a shy and normal teenager, who somehow finds himself being sent to the principal's office every other week. He has a crush on Jacklynne, the most popular girl in school, so he decides to run for Student Council President in order to impress her. After announcing his candidacy, Emilio discovers, to his horror, that Jacklynne herself will be his opponent. Emotions fly high as campaign fever intensifies. After a poignant domino match, Emilio reasons that by sacrificing himself and losing the election, he would be able to win over her heart. Emilio devises a risky plan to rig the election in her favor, which includes sneaking into the school's computer lab to change the voting results, and simulating an electrical failure to divert potential suspicion. The plan succeeds, and an encounter with the school's tyrannical principal is narrowly avoided. Immediately after changing the voting results, Emilio confronts Jacklynne and confesses his love for her, but she brushes past his confession, showing that she has no affection for him and rendering his efforts for naught. In an epilogue scene, after seeing Jacklynne freaking out in public, he decides that it was better she rejected him, and reveals that Maria is now his girlfriend. As the group is together in their car spending time together, the principal of the school pulls up next to them on a motorcycle with her boyfriend and having a completely changed appearance and demeanor. She throws them back a domino they had dropped before speeding off, leaving the entire group dumbfounded and gaping.

== Cast ==
- Marian Pabón as Principal Richardson
- Mario Pabón (not to be confused with his grandfather) as Emilio
- Irene Lucio as María Eugenia
- Fernando Castro-Álvarez as Señor Angel
- Ricardo Arias as Alfredo
- Marisa Gómez as Natalia
- Alexis Arce as Mónica
- Maite Cantó as Jacklynne
- Manuel Benítez as Manolete
- Albert Rodriguez as Sr. Bismark
- Tino Garcia as Don Paco

== Production ==
First-time directors, Jaime and Tony Vallés, had some experience working in theater. However, they had never made a movie before. They studied filmmaking through books and the Internet.

To make the film, they approached members of their own family, among them the Puerto Rican actress, Marian Pabón, and Mario Pabón. Most of the cast were inexperienced actors taken directly from school, in order to give a feeling of naturalness and spontaneity to the film.

The auditions for the teenage cast were held in three private schools in San Juan, Puerto Rico:

- Academia del Perpetuo Socorro (location of most of the film, and the film's directors' alma mater)
- Commonwealth High School
- Saint John's School

Some of the novice actors, like Ricardo Arias, had to be persuaded by the directors. The directors were forced to fill the role of María Eugenia with a replacement, Irene Lucio.

To minimize expenses, all of the cast had to provide their own wardrobe, except for the school uniform shirts.

== Reviews ==
Despite being a low-budget film, it has received critical praise, including Ronnie Scheib from Variety magazine, and Joe Baltake, of the Philadelphia Film Festival, who compared it with Mean Girls and Clueless.

== Awards ==
- San Diego Latino Film Festival - Audience Award
- Philadelphia Film Festival - Third Place
- Chicago Latino Film Festival - First Place
- New York International Latino Film Festival - Official Selection
- Vistas Film Festival - Official Selection
- Boston Latino Film Festival - Official Selection

== See also ==
- Cinema of Puerto Rico
- List of films set in Puerto Rico
