= Radio in Puerto Rico =

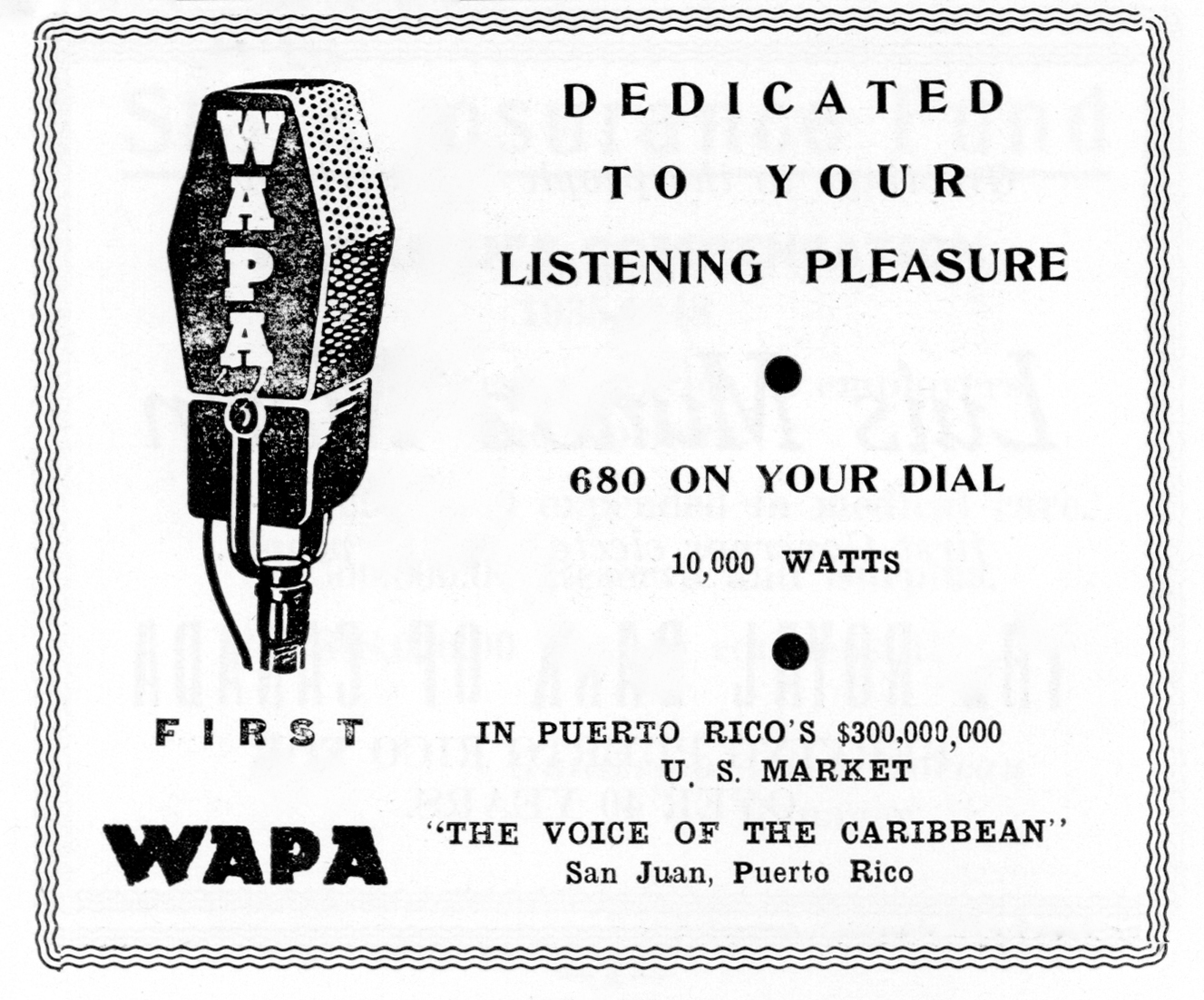
A 1940s radio advertisement for WAPA.

The introduction of radio to Puerto Rico dates back to 1916, with commercial stations first appearing in 1922. It was the third jurisdiction in the world to be retrofitted with radio transmitters. The archipelago also hosted the second station in Latin America. As such, Puerto Rico had transmissions before Washington D.C., despite the latter being responsible of designating the coordinates of local stations. During the early years, pioneers like Antonio Torres Martinó and Teófilo Villavicencio lead what was an experimental stage, which has been loosely documented. This was followed by the "Golden Age", which has been variably stated to cover the 1930s-40s or extend into the 1950s. The arrival of television during the mid-20th Century displaced the technology to the second place among the local media, but it continues to retain a large presence to the present day despite the advent of the internet. In Puerto Rico, May is recognized as the Month of Radio.

== History ==
=== First transmitters and radioaficionados ===
As far back as 1916, amateurs had begun experimenting with the construction of small transmitters and receptors. Among them was Joaquín Agusty, who had studied the literature that he could order, such as Electro Importing Company magazine that allowed him to assemble a makeshift receptor (which included an electric coil, battery, bronce wiring, a condenser, and an antenna supported by bamboo posts) at San Juan, with which he received his first transmission. After being interrupted by World War I, he continued tinkering as he continued intercepting signals. By 1920, Agusty (who remained the only with the technology to send messages) joined Jesús T. Piñero, Facundo Bueso, Luis Rexach, J. Maduro Ramos and his stepson Enrique Camuñas in creating the Porto Rico Radio Club. That same year, Camuñas became the first Puerto Rican to receive a radio aficionado license, being followed by the rest. Agusty also created a magazine, Puerto Rico Radio News. Amateur receptors reportedly received signals in international code and KDKA. The sound, which was completely foreign to the general populace, attracted superstition.

=== WKAQ begins the commercial era ===
By August 1922, there were around six amateur stations at Puerto Rico, when the first formal station began being assembled at Tanca street in San Juan. During the following months the staff, among whom was Agusty, began assembling the equipment including a 500-watt transmitter and a couple of steel towers (one 90 feet tall and the other 180). The tests that were conducted proved successful. On December 3, 1922, Agusty himself hosted WKAQ's first official transmission (the fifth of its kind in the globe) which opened with a rendition of La Borinqueña. The participants were nervous and wondering if they were being heard, but the show went on with an inaugural speech by Emilio del Toro Cuebas and music by Isabel Soria, Elsa Rivera Salgado, Antonio Vidal, Rafael Balseiro, Carmen Sanabia de Figueroa and Pepito Figueroa. Soon after, the public began calling the station and confirming that it was on the air. Agusty offered a speech in his role as president of the PRRC, before another music spell closed the transmission. The first remote transmission took place the same evening, Joaquín Burset's (the station's artistic director) orquesta live from Cine Rialto. The shows held at La Cafetera, an establishment frequented by WKAQ's staff, were also frequently aired.

Meanwhile, sales boomed in the metropolitan region of Puerto Rico with radio devices being bought by both individuals and businesses. Those that could not afford them, began visiting acquaintances that did. In more rural areas, the development was seen with more skepticism, while a superstitious minority still remained. The Puerto Rican danza (including the work of Juan Morel Campos) was ever present in the music shows and featured among those of Rachmaninoff and other foreign genres like foxtrot and opera. Agusty constantly recruited artists to perform for WKAQ, including a cameo by Antonio Paoli.

Conferences, conventions, religious programming and news of events were also part of WKAQ's programming. Francisco Quiñones became the first "popular singer" to perform for the station, helping it reach the masses. Besides being the administrator, Agusty also worked as director and announcer during this stage. Afterwards, Sanabia and Pepito were joined by her other son, Narciso, and became a recurring act along the Rialto and Jesús Figueroa orquestas. Trying to employ the hours were the interference of foreign stations was at its lowest, Agusty began a successful midnight show with the collaboration of Augusto Rodríguez and Rosa María Berrios. Despite having to drive the artists home himself, the show's audience reached Spain and Checoslovaquia. By 1923, WKAQ was hosting original special programming, like the Christmas show.

The early years included the participation of artists like Rosa María "Rosita" Berríos, Reynés Agudo, Josefina Guillermety, Gladys Peters, Padre Laburu, Rafael Agudo. Early programa included Los Jíbaros de la Radio, La Tremenda Corte, Los Embajadores del Buen Humor and El Tremendo Hotel, with Rafael Agudo being a fixture in them. WKAQ continued a variety programing, which also included sports, until 1928. A paid tribune for defunct political party Alianza Puertorriqueña was the first political show aired locally, after which a convention of the Socialist Party was also covered. The experience they acquired locally allowed them to have opportunitie abroad, Pepito and Narciso Figueroa participating in the first radio show ever aired in Spain. He had taken the role after declining an initial offer from the Radio Corporation of Puerto Rico. He was joined by Manolo Ochoa, who began working as an amateur for the station.

During its first decade, the station earned listeners in Canada, Cuba, the Dominican Republic and the United States. However, the progress of the medium was systematic and slow. During its first years, WKAQ operated at a loss, since it was still not commercially oriented (it featured programming similar to WJZ, while Burset began bringing in new artists), and only one hour per week. Afterwards, this improved to three. The weather report, especially during the hurricane season, was a priority and would warrant special transmissions. After Agusty retired, Manolo Ochoa succeeded him in leading WKAQ.

By 1928, WKAQ had spent over $91,000. Two years later, the station's potential for commercial programming was evident since 25,000 listeners were joining on 4,000 devices. The first radio novela (also the first radio drama), Los Misterios de Paris, was sponsored by a perfume store. By this decade, horse races were popular and gathered high ratings, but forced Agusty to build a remote amplifier. Compañía de la Luz, Revista Alma Latina, Arturo Somohano, Hermanos Berríos among other shows aired as radio had gathered widespread adoption throughout Puerto Rico.

=== The Diplo era ===
Starting in the 1930s, a number of figures participated in radio, coming to the medium from theatre and other artistic manifestations. Teófilo Villacencio, who became prominent as a radio host during the 1930s, convinced Luis Muñoz Marín to use radio as a propaganda tool. Local radio had also captured the attention of stations abroad and on October 31, 1930, New York-based WGY aired a Puerto Rico special. The industry also experienced several changes during this timeframe, Cecilia Torres became the first woman to take over a control board, doing so for WNEL. On April 2, 1931, WKAQ transmitted a Pedro Albizu Campos transmitted a speech at the behest of Federico E. Virella, distancing from the more popular and giving voice to a political group that was not part of the establishment. This marked the beginning of a tendency of other political parties using radio as a means to promote their platforms.

Four more stations were created in Puerto Rico; one at San Juan, Mayagüez and two at Ponce. Figures like radio hosts Teófilo Villaviciencio, Rafael H. Benítez, Pedro José Martínez, José Antonio Martinó and Antonio Cruz y Nieves, among others, gained prominence within the expanding industry. The consecutive passing of hurricanes San Felipe and San Ciprián in 1932 destroyed one of WKAQ's towers, briefly hindering the booming industry. Payo Acosta built an unauthorized station at Cayey, trough which several figures including comedian Ramón Rivero (better known for his stagename "Diplo") debuted. In 1934, newspaper La Correspondencia sponsored a radio periodical transmitted trough WKAQ. The show, hosted by Rafael Quiñones Vidal, later moved to WNEL. His son, Rafael Quiñones Borrás served as radio host. Director Víctor M. Molina hosted Radio Souvenir. Domingo Díaz and his eponymous son hosted the station's noon show. Meanwhile, horse race narrator Pedro Martinó Suárez directed Radio Arte.

On November 17, 1934, Juan Pizá's WNEL became the second station to operate (500 watts) at San Juan, with its Calle Sol headquarters being inaugurated in a ceremony that included the participation of several government and religious officials. It later became the first local station to affiliate itself with the Transradio News Services and National Broadcasting Company. WNEL also gained notoriety for bringing in foreign artists along programming such as Reinaldo Paniagua's La Hora Social. WNEL eventually moved to Calle San Francisco and improved to 2500 watts during daytime and 1000 watts during nighttime. José Arzuaga served as the station's chief technician, while Juan Oteyza was the chief of control. WNEL's radio hosts were Camilo Fraticelli, Rafael Benliza and Raymond Costello. By 1935, the government had begun to acquire air time as part of a program affiliated to the Department of Instruction.

While theater plays were adapted for radio, airing trough WKAQ and WNEL, comedy would soon earn the top spot. Radio theater featured the likes of Lucy Boscana, Rafael Oller, Lolita Lázaro, Guillermo Bauzá, Esther Palés, Cecilia Cavero, Alfonso Miranda Sr., Juano Hernández, Madeline Williamsen, Alfonso Miranda Jr., Olga Lugo, Walter Bothwell, Adelaida Gatell, Rafael Agudo and Ramón Pardo. Radio comedians included Enfraín "Pan Doblao" Berrios, Tavín Pumarejo and Osvaldo Seda. El Tremendo Hotel featuring Rivero, grew to be the highest rated show and focused on his figure so much that it became colloquially known as "Diplo's program". As technology continued to advance, the local stations invested in new equipment. Initially, phonograph records were used for the station and sponsors. These, however, were susceptible to heat and other forms of damage. Wire recorders were introduced afterwards, but proved just as unreliable and abandoned shortly afterwards. Ultimately, the reel-to-reel tape recorder was the first device that allowed for reliable recording.

The music of Rafael Hernández, Trio Vegabajeño, Trio Matamoros, Bobby Capó, Mirta Silva, Mingo y los Whooppee Kids, Juan Albizu, the Ponce Casino Orquesta, Casino de la Playa Orquesta, Cuarteto Marcano, Cuarteto Flores, the Jack's Club Orquesta, Ruth Fernández, the Miguel Miranda Orquesta, Antonio Machín, Pedro Vargas, José Luis Moneró, Armando Ríos Araujo, Félix Castrillón, Manolín Flores, Alfonso López Prado, Ernesto Vázquez, the Mario Dumond Orquesta, Cuarteto Mayarí, Rafael Muñoz, Tito Guizar and Pedro Vargas were popular. Recordings of Hernández's work were imported from recording studios abroad, even before the recording industry had boomed. Other individuals involved with this stage of Puerto Rican radio were José Antonio Torres Martinó, Rafael José Acosta, Delia Esther Quiñones, Rafael Quiñones Vidal, William Córdova Cirino, Sofía Rodríguez, Osvaldo Torres Velázquez, Mariano Artau, Héctor Luis Vázquez, Charlie García de Quevedo, Radamés Mayoral, Patricio "Spimbol" Fermaint, Esteban Rosado Báez, Rafael Benítez, Héctor Moll, Alicia Moreda, Miguel Ángel Nieves, José Gilberto Morales, Antonio Alfonso, Sofía Rodríguez de Nacer, Felipe Jiménez Rivera, others to host shows included Juan Boria, González Marín, Andrés Cámara, Paulina Singerman, Eusebia Cosme and Dalia Iñiguez.

Julio M. Conesa built the equipment of Ponce's first station, WPRP, which he inaugurated on May 29, 1936. It aired shows like La Hora del Parque, El Preguntón Aéreo, Tribuna del Aire among others. In 1940, the station improved from 250 watts to 5000. On June 13, 1937, Rafael Pérez Perry and Andrés Cámara inaugurated WPRA at Mayagüez. The station began operating at 250 watts during daytime and 100 during nighttime. In 1938, WPRA improved to 2500 watts in the 780 frequency. During World War II, the station aired the first English-language news shows in Puerto Rico. Afterwards, WPRA improved to 10,000 watts at a frequency of 990 kilocycles. On August 14, 1940, Miguel Soltero Palermo's WPAB (1000 watts, 1340 kilocycles) was inaugurated at Calle León in Ponce. Afterwards it improved to 10,000 watts and 990 KC.

=== The Golden Era ===
During the 1940s, several stations were inaugurated including WIAC (1942), WKVM (1945), WPBP (1946), WKJB (1946), WECW (1946), WAPA (1947), WIBS (1947), WMDD (1947), WCMN (1947), WRIA (1947), WORA (1947), WRSJ (1947), WENA (1947), WVJP (1947), WITA (1948), WEMB (1948), WAEL (1948), WXRF (1948), WRAI (1949) and WUNO (1949). The decade also marked the debut of WIPR, the government's official station. Most municipalities favored their own stations, tough some metropolitan stations had shows that were popular island-wide. During the 1950s more joined, including WABA (1951), WMIA (1957), WNIK (1957), WTIL (1950), WISO (1953), WLEO (1956), WHOA (1954), WKYN (1960), WPRM-FM (1959), WIVV-AM (1956) and WGSX-FM (1959). The years comprising World War II (and later the Korean War) saw radio serve a medium of understanding the situation abroad, while sad songs like those sung by Daniel Santos covered the air waves with solemnity.

Property of Enrique Abarca Sanfeliz and Félix Muñiz Souffront, WIAC (named after the West Indies Advertising Company) aired at 5000 watts and 580 KC. It was coadministrated by Enrique Abarca Jr. and Tomás Muñiz. The station marked the beginning for Tommy Muñiz, Yoyo Boing, Paquito Cordero and José Miguel Agrelot, while others like Luis Vigoreaux worked as radio hosts. Agrelot, hosted the morning show Alegre Despertar for decades, becoming the longest running show. Another long running show was Ernesto García's Hora de Arte y Buen Humor. The decade saw the airing of a large amount of shows and events sponsored by advertisers. Theater and drama like Estudio X, radio magazines like Antena, radionovelas like El Collar de Lágrimas, comedy such as Torito & Co., ¡Que Sirvienta!, Adelita, la secretaria, Tarzan, The Spitit and adaptations, such as Cayetano Coll y Toste's La Hija del Verdugo characterized the 1940s.

In 1945, the president of the American Colonial Broadcasting Corporation Rafael Pérez Perry opened WKVM (10,000 watts 1070 KC), which became the first station inaugurated in the municipality of Arecibo. However, after Pérez Perry died, WKVM was sold to the Catholic Church's San Juan branch. Mayagüez experienced a surge in the industry during 1946, when WKJB (200 watts 1340 KC) and WECW (250 watts and 1490 KC) were inaugurated. Arecibo also saw the inauguration of its second station, WCMN (1000 watts 1280 KC), of the Caribbean Broadcasting Corporation. In 1947, José Ramón Quiñones opened WAPA (10,000 watts and 680 KC) at San Juan. The station allied itself with WORA (which has been inaugurated the same year) allowing part of its signal to be retransmitted in the west coast, the first such arrangement in Puerto Rico. This year also saw the inauguration of José R. Madrazo's (and temporary owner Rubén Díaz Atiles) WMDD at Fajardo, and the tandem of Borinquen Broadcasting Company's WVJP and Inter-American Radio Corporation's WRIA at Caguas. The municipality also saw the inauguration of WIBS at Santurce, becoming known for airing daily drama skits and hosting a show for the Puerto Rican Independence Party.

The Asociación de Radiodifusores was created in 1947, with Tomás Muñiz Souffront becoming its first proper president. In 1948, newspaper magnate Ángel Ramos entered the industry, building the studios for WEMB (5000 watt and 1320 KC) at the headquarters of El Mundo. Besides featuring state of the art equipment, the station became known for stunts such as remotely airing a concert of Puerto Rican figures held at Carnegie Hall. Other such ventures included Electric Enterprises' inauguration of WITA (250 watts and 1400 KC) at Santurce, which was acquired by competitor newspaper El Imparcial. At Mayagüez, WAEL (250 watts 1400 KC) went on air in 1948.

On January 26, 1949, the government opened its own station, WIPR (10,000 watts and 940 KC), at Santurce. After operating within the Communications Authority during a year and a half it was transferred to the Department of Public Instruction in July 1950. The station featured a staff that included Rafael Hernández, Abelardo Díaz Alfaro and Sylvia Rexach, Miguel Ángel Alvarez, Enrique Laguerre, Lucy Boscana, Gustavo Palés Matos among others that transcended to other media. Beginning with a fire, station moved twice and ended at Puerta de Tierra.

By the 1950s, local stations had created large music catalogues. Felipe Rodríguez, Leocadio Vizcarrondo, Johnny Rodríguez, Trio Vegabajeño, the César Concepción Orquesta, Bobby Capó, Cheíto González, Luz María Rolón, the Figueroa-Castro Duo, Ramón Reyes, Tobín, Rubén Berrios' Orquesta, Venegas Lloveras, Trio Santurce, Angelina Alicea, Vidalina Santiago, María Esther Pérez Félix, José Antonio Salamán and Daniel Santos, among others (both local and foreign), headlined the decade that is also called the "Golden Era" of Puerto Rican radio. The arrival of television also led to the crossover of several figures. Camino Fraticelli was one of the most successful, being able to move between mediums with the support of the advertisers, who competed over him. Radio remained the main source of information, with stations having their own reporters and joining the international news services.

A standard practice had been established within the industry, the language was presented in a non-technical manner to the average citizen and an emphasis was placed on not promoting the figure of outlaws as folk heroes. On the topic of Puerto Rican history, radio was used as a platform to distribute it. Meanwhile, the sale of airtime to external interests gained more prominence. Gilbert Mamery created Discoteca del Recuerdo, which would follow Mi Alegre Despertar in terms of durability. Shows like La Clase Diaria, El Carrusel de la Alegría, El Colmado de la Esquina, El Fiscal Informa, La Gaviota, were aired during the decade.

Diplo continued to lead the ratings, while Tommy Muñiz's La Familia Pérez dominated the younger demographics. Music, poetry, news, radionovelas, comedy and variety shows were fixtures. Sports such as baseball and basketball were also popular, so horse racing as the career of legendary horse Camarero unraveled during the decade. Popular activities were also covered and aired. While figures like Rafael Agudo remained relevant, several others emerged including Jacobo Morales, Luis de Tejada, Esther Sandoval, Enrique Muñiz Gutiérrez, Manuel Borrero, Eugenio Guerra, Luis Rigual, Aníbal González Irizarry, Enrique Vélez Posada, Emilio E. Huyke, Guillermo José Torres and many others. Foreigners also arrived, chiefly from Latin America, performing a number of roles. The careers of Adalberto "Machuchal" Rodríguez, Tommy Muñiz and José Miguel Agrelot consolidated further during the 1950s.

In 1954, Ángel Ramos became the president of the Asociación de Radiodifusores, holding the office for three years. He was succeeded by Rafael Pérez Perry, who remained president until 1959. During these years, the industry experienced several changes. The hegemony of local businessmen as owners was shattered, when Quiñones sold WAPA to foreign interests. A dichotomy between broadcasting methods became apparent. With the arrival of WORA-FM in 1956. This station used FM broadcasting and focused on airing music over talk shows, while the AM stations became known for airing political and academic content. Romantic music was prevalent and dominated the FM curriculum.

=== Radio in the television era ===
Radio survived predictions of doom following the arrival of television and entered the 1960s still a massive industry, with requests for new stations being prevalent among an environment of specialization. New arrivals included WIVA-FM (1964), WCMN-FM (1967), WNIK-FM (1965), WLUZ-AM (1966), WEKO-AM (1970), WVJP-FM (1968), WCHQ-FM (1968), WIDA-AM (1964), WVOZ-FM (1967), WLEY-AM (1965), WORO-FM (1968), WAEL-FM (1970), WDOY-FM (1969), WSRA-FM (1966), WISA-AM/FM (1961), WCGB-AM (1967), WMMT-AM (1961), WKJB-FM (1963), WOYE-FM (1965), WZAR-FM (1966), WOQI-FM (1969), WIOC-FM (1970), WHOY-AM (1967), WKFE-AM (1961), WLRP-AM (1965), WRPC-FM (1970), WBMJ-AM (1968), WIAC-FM (1961), WIPR-FM (1960), WCAD-FM (1968), WQBS-AM (1960), WIOA-FM (1968) and WUPR-AM (1964). Politics and religion continued expanding into the medium, leading to the creation of more ideological shows. Despite this growth, a necessity to create new radio hosts was noted as "pone discos" (people that only knew how to play music) prevailed after genres like novelas, comedies and talk shows (and most figures) migrated to television, leading to relevant classes being offered in the UPR and later other universities.

Ventura Lamas held the presidency of the Asociación de Radiodifusores until 1963. Diring the remainer of the decade the office was filled by Efraín Archilla Roig, Mariano Angelet Escudero and Héctor Reichard. During the latter's term, a documentary program known as La Historia de la Radio (1970) was sponsored by the entity and aired trough several stations. During this time, religious programming became prevalent in radio to the point of saturation, in part due to the belief that sponsoring them was "public service" on behalf of the owners. Eventually, the station's began charging for these spaces. Alfred Herger introduced a "new wave" of artists including Lucecita Benítez, Chucho Avellanet, Lissette Álvarez, Danny Rivera, Wilkins, Ednita Nazario, among others.

The commercialization of the FM band with the introduction music like rock and salsa led to the amount of stations becoming bloated during the 1970s, reaching 45 in that range and 67 AM stations . Inaugurated during this decade were WRFE-FM (1975), WTPM-FM (1971), WBQN-AM (1975), WOLA-AM (1976), WXYX-FM (1979), WCHQ-AM (1971), WBRQ-FM (1972), WFAB-AM (1971), WZOL-FM (1976), WMLD-FM (1973), WENA-AM (1978), WPPC-AM (1978), WZBS-AM (1973), WREI-FM (1974), WOSO-AM (1977), WEGA-AM (1972), WSAN-FM (1978), WXEW-AM (1978) and WKCK (1979). The industry became saturated (with many specialized stations focusing on education or religion) which marked a decline in the money available for specific products and the frustration of figures like Agrelot, who felt that it was failing in its social obligations and argued in favor of reclaiming control over communications. William C. Berry of the FCC had exacerbated this problem when he banned requesting AM stations in places where FM was still available.

The 1970s also saw an influx of second generation individuals becoming involved in radio. More women were also seen in several roles within the industry. Archilla Roig became the first person to repeat as president in 1973. Under his incumbency it instituted the Ondas Award. In 1977, the television stations disaffiliated to form their own entity. During this time, Jorge Luis Arzuaga took office. The inauguration of twenty more stations during the 1980s (for a total of 112) made Puerto Rico the place with more stations per square mile in the world by May 14, 1990. The new arrivals were WBJA-AM (1981), WBOZ-FM (1980), WGDL-AM (1983), WJDZ-FM (1986), WCXQ-AM (1983), WCQC-AM (1981), WEUC-FM (1984), WRTU-FM (1980), WRSS-AM (1984), WPJC-AM (1989), WVID-FM (1983), WCRP-FM (1982), WOIZ-AM (1985), WMSW-AM (1980), WAVB-AM (1985), WRIO-FM (1986), WORR-AM (1985), WBOZ-AM (1986) and WSOL-AM (1985). This development led to requests to cease the granting of new licenses and Berry became inclined to agree, paralyzing the process. While specialization prevailed, few examples like WALO and WUPR, retained a more generalized programming.

During this decade, the Asociación de Radiodifusores had several presidents, Alan Mejía (1981–84), Byron Mitchell (1984–86), Benito Martínez (1986–88) and Efraín Archilla Diez (1988). The entity operated under the assumption that cable would severely Impact television, leading to a resurgence of radio during the 1990s. This belief was further fueled by increasing tariffs and lower production costs. Meanwhile, the industry began retrofitting AM stations to rival the FM ones. The performance of radio as an informational medium following the passing of hurricane Hugo favored the industry.

== Publications and academia ==
=== Books ===
By 1951, Ismael Rodríguez Bou was documenting the early history of the medium in Puerto Rico in Caminos del Aire.
