= Hernan Nigaglioni =

Puerto Rican theater promotor

Hernán Nigaglioni Rodríguez (b. February 10, 1910 - d. March 12, 2004) was a Puerto Rican cultural promoter, educator, and public servant who played a key role in the development of the performing arts and communications infrastructure in Puerto Rico during the 20th century. He was instrumental in the establishment and direction of the University of Puerto Rico Theater and contributed significantly to the island's theatrical, musical, and broadcasting history.

== Early life and education ==
Nigaglioni was born in Yauco, Puerto Rico, the seventh of nine children of Teodosio Nigaglioni and Crescencia Rodríguez. He spent his childhood and adolescence in Yauco. He enrolled in the University of Puerto Rico (UPR), where he was elected president of the Athletic Society. In 1933, he graduated from the UPR’s Army Reserve Officers' Training Corps (AROTC) with the rank of lieutenant. He served in the United States Army until the rank of captain. In 1938, he briefly studied medicine in Maryland before returning to Puerto Rico. Nigaglioni was a member of the Phi Sigma Alpha fraternity.

== Career ==
While a student, Nigaglioni organized artistic events featuring student performers. He created and directed the first student-run theater troupe at UPR, known as the "Farándula Universitaria," which performed across the island and laid the groundwork for future university theatrical tours.

In 1936, alongside prominent Puerto Rican leaders in Washington, D.C., he secured funding from U.S. Secretary of the Interior Harold Ickes for the construction of the University of Puerto Rico Theater. At Ickes’ request, Nigaglioni traveled to the United States to study modern theater construction and operations, using New York's Radio City Music Hall as a model. Upon his return, he was appointed the first director of the UPR Theater, where he brought internationally renowned artists and performances to the venue, including concerts by Andrés Segovia, Pablo Casals, and Jesús María Sanromá.

In 1937, he directed the Puerto Rican premiere of Alejandro Casona’s play "Nuestra Natacha" with the Farándula Universitaria. The production was later performed by a mixed cast of university students and visiting Spanish actors, and finally by Casona’s own company.

During World War II, Nigaglioni managed Special Services for the U.S. Army, organizing entertainment for troops. After the war, he served as assistant to UPR President Carlos Chardón and transitioned into media and business. He founded a successful advertising agency and became a pioneer in Puerto Rican television and film. Notably, he produced the film The Man with My Face and the NBC radio program Duffy's Tavern featuring prominent Hollywood talent. He also launched musical variety shows, radio soap operas, and introduced the Harlem Globetrotters and Ice Follies to Puerto Rican audiences.

Nigaglioni played a role in inaugurating Puerto Rican television through WKAQ and WAPA, and organized the first televised baseball game on the island. He managed the Sixto Escobar Stadium and organized the inaugural Central American and Caribbean Games in Puerto Rico.

He served as administrator of Tommy Muñiz Productions and organized significant events including the first hemispheric newspaper owners’ convention (SIP) and the inauguration of new broadcasting facilities for El Mundo. He also coordinated the First Convention of State Governors in Puerto Rico.

== Personal life ==
Nigaglioni married Awilda Vallés Morales, and they had two daughters, Wally and Marilda. In his later years, he retired in San Juan.

== Recognition ==
In recognition of his lifelong contributions to the arts and public service, the Senate of Puerto Rico formally honored Nigaglioni.

== Death ==
Hernan Nigaglioni died on March 12, 2004, in San Juan, Puerto Rico at the age of 94. He was buried at the Puerto Rico National Cemetery.

== See also ==
- List of Puerto Ricans
