= Television in Puerto Rico =

History of Television in the Caribbean island of Puerto Rico

During the 1950s the impending arrival of television created public expectation in Puerto Rico, even influencing other entertainment mediums in the form of a song. WKAQ-TV was the first station to introduce regular programing in 1954, followed closely by WAPA-TV. The owners of these stations, Ángel Ramos and José Ramón Quiñones, brought their experience in the newspaper and radio industries to the new medium. The competition between WKAQ and WAPA would continue for decades, with both disputing the milestones of first videotape in 1966, first color transmission and satellite transmission in 1968. During decades, the ratings were dominated by local programming produced by Tommy Muñiz and Paquito Cordero, which adopted a family friendly approach. However, the retirement of the former, combined with the introduction of cable television and the acquisition of the largest stations by foreign interest brought changes in content beginning in the 1980s, with late-night shows and double entendre gaining prominence. Digital television was introduced to the market in 2009, widely displacing analog television.

== History ==
=== Early years ===
On July 24, 1952, Ángel Ramos received approval from the FCC to create his own station within four years. José Ramón Quiñones received his on August 12, 1952. On February 12, 1954, El Mundo Broadcasting Company and WKAQ-TV officially received its license to operate channel 2. Ponce de León Broadcasting Company and WAPA-TV received channel 4 on March 15, 1954. Heavy publicity preceded the inauguration of WKAQ-TV with El Mundo serving as its main outlet, but the inauguration suffered postponement to March due to a delay in the arrival of a transmission tower and meanwhile a static image of a native man would be in place. It was then assembled at Marquesa mountain in Aguas Buenas, some 2,000 feet above sea level. The frequency was set to 100,000 watts. The station would become the first local transmitter, with its first show being aired at 6:30 p.m. on March 28, 1954, from San Juan. Puerto Rican star Mapy Cortés appeared along her husband Fernando in the first programs when the medium was inaugurated. WAPA-TV tested images and commercials in February 25 and March 5, even airing an interview with Felisa Rincón de Gautier hosted by Carlos Rubén Ortiz and Enrique Soler, but did not follow it. WAPA-TV would introduce its programming on May 1, 1954. Most of the publicity surrounded WKAQ-TV, with El Mundo being particularly sympathetic to owner Ángel Ramos despite other stations emerging. El Imparcial, in response, gave its publicity to WAPA-TV and its owner José R. Quiñones, who adopted an educational and religious approach in its programming. Alma Latina magazine gave coverage to all.

Ramos gifted televisions to his employees, while more where awarded as a price in contests promoted by El Mundo and WKAQ Radio. One of those was won by the head nun of a retirement home, causing confusion among the residents when the monitor was sent. Some residents managed to intercept foreign signals prior to the inauguration. A Supreme Court judge even suggested that an accused man should buy a television to entertain himself when granting him bail. Competition between television manufacturers began before the nascent industry was inaugurated. Corporations dedicated to selling furniture and eyeglasses benefited from the arrival. Prior to the arrival of the new industry, 4,000 television sets had been sold. In its first year, WKAQ was airing 90 live shows per week, while WAPA-TV only had 30, but WAPA then founded its own studios to improve that quantity. However, its nascent status was still reflected in the instability of programming, which in turn put the work of entertainers, news reporters and producers at risk. Only a dozen of WKAQ's initial shows survived its first year. Efforts were made to meet the standards of the advertisers with the money available-the TV stations' staff would multitask and script writers would be in charge of more than one show at a time. Demographics were targeted to meet the demands of these brands, with people such as Carmen Despradel targeting a specific audience (in her case, housewives). Early television was heavily dependent on advertisers, who would place advertisements in shows and even annex their brand to the name. However, this resulted in unappealing titles. By 1956, WKAQ-TV had instituted a limit of three minutes of commercials per half-hour show. It was these advertisers who would arbitrarily select the format, talents and other aspects of programming. Several figures migrating from radio began working advertisements, which opened the door for some to become established and earn other roles in television.

Television proved to be a hit, and within a year there were at least 53,194 television sets owned in the country, which equaled one for every 42 Puerto Ricans. Within two years, radio had experienced a sharp decline, with stations losing both advertisements and entertainers amidst the instability. Radio personalities complained that there were difficulties entering into the new medium, which had since created its own clique. Ramón Rivero continued to thrive in both mediums with his character of "Diplo". Ante la ley, the first Puerto Rican telenovela, was aired on August 22, 1955, by WKAQ-TV. WAPA-TV responded with Mar Brava, perpetuating the genre in local television for decades to come. Local radio technicians traveled abroad to become acquainted with the new technology, while foreign personnel also arrived to participate in the nascent industry. By 1956, the growing quantity of foreign entertainers coming to work in Puerto Rican television shows had caused an increasing anger in the local entertainers. During that year's summer, three shows produced by Tommy Muñiz held the top spots in the ratings. On April 29, 1959, El colegio de la alegría was revived at WAPA-TV, with its original cast and the addition of Velda González and Yoyo Boing. By early 1961, the amount of TV sets in Puerto Rico had increased to nearly 218,000 sets. This trend continued until Puerto Rico became the place with most television sets by square mile in Latin America and the Caribbean. Entering the 1960s, the prime-time slots were occupied by Myrta Silva's Una hora contigo and Rendezvous Nocturno hosted by Vilma Carbia and Tony Chiroldi. Foreigners such as Gaspar Pumarejo would replace this group. Meanwhile, WKAQ-TV only counted with El Show Libby's hosted by Luis Vigoreaux and El Show Ford hosted by Cordero as its local productions, with most being imported. By this time WKAQ, WAPA, WIPR and WKBM were based in San Juan, WRIK and WSUR at Ponce, WORA and WIPM at Mayagüez and WOLE at Aguadilla. WKBM-TV was founded by Rafael Pérez Perry, a radio entrepreneur. In February 1960, WKAQ debuted its videotape equipment, the first in Latin America. However, the complications that arose from using a costly new technology meant that most shows were still filmed live, with it becoming more popular for soap operas and commercials. WAPA, WIPR and WKBM introduced the technology as well and some years later it was predominant. By September 1956, however, the local channels had begun airing more kinescope, which were cheaper to air than a live production.

=== Increase in local programming ===
Early in its run, foreign programming would be imported to meet demands. WKAQ had its own dubbing department, which contracted local talent. By June 1960, Paquito Cordero opted to leave Producciones Tommy Muñiz and begin producing its own shows, creating a competition between both. He established his headquarters at First Federal building and kept the advertisement of Ford Motor Company and El show Ford with it. In late 1961, Muñiz decided to grant exclusivity to WAPA-TV. Reina por un día was dominant in the ratings for six years and shifted from channel to channel, in 1960 it moved from WKAQ to WAPA and went back in 1964, where it joined El show del mediodía in a noon block produced by Producciones Tommy Muñiz. The show resulted in thousands of letters being sent to Producciones Tommy Muñiz, where people exposed their problems in hopes that they would be attended in the show. This block marked the first time that daytime shows dominated the ratings in Puerto Rico. With Muñiz's El show del mediodía dominating the noon ratings, WKAQ decided to bring Paquito Cordero in 1965. A conflict between APATE and Roberto Vigoreaux, Paquito Cordero and Mario Pabón over the use of foreign talent lead to WAPA-TV stopping its production of telenovelas for nearly a decade. Meanwhile, in the previous decade more local stations had been inaugurated. WORA-TV began airing on October 12, 1955, due to the efforts of Alfredo Ramírez de Arellano to create a station for the west coast of Puerto Rico. On January 6, 1958, the government debuted its own station, WIPR-TV, with the claim that it was the first educational station in Latin America. On February 2, 1958, Mario Villalonga debuted his station in the south coast. In December 1955, WKAQ received new equipment to film in kinescope. WRIK-TV was founded by Alfredo Ramírez de Arellano as a re-transmitter of WKAQ-TV, airing on Channel 7. During the 1960s, a subsidiary of Columbia Pictures named Screen Gems bought WAPA-TV and placed Norman Louvau as its new president. However, unable to communicate in Spanish, most of the work ended in the hands of Vice President Héctor Modestti, who insisted on eliminating American shows that were dubbed. With this came a change in programming, during which Tommy Muñiz's La criada malcriada was pitched to the channel while the producers and advertisers involved in a pilot filmed at WKAQ had conflicts with that station's protocols. In 1965, Cordero debuted El show de las doce at WKAQ as a response to the popular El show del mediodía. Unable to best its competition's comedy, the show instead focused on music acts with the collaboration of bands such as El Gran Combo. In response, Muñiz incorporated a similar content to El show del mediodía. While Cordero brought in El show de Olga y Tony, WAPA responded with Kon kon paz. WKAQ then aired segments with El club canta la juventud, Chucho Avellanet, Lucecita Benítez, Alfred D. Herger and Al Zeppy. These exchanges continued and eventually, Cordero brought in Rivera in Mi hippie me encanta, resulting in an exchange where both shows reinforced its comedy. This competition also featured special shows, such as an episode of El show de las doce focused on the marriage of Avellanet and Lissette Álvarez in 1967. Muñiz debuted a short lived duo, Wilkins y Rubén, which launched Wilkins' solo career as soon as it was broken and along Yolandita Monge first received media attention in El show del mediodía. Meanwhile, Carmita Jímenez, Danny Rivera as Charityn Goyco were also featured. However, a comedy act where an affair of governor Roberto Sánchez Villella was mentioned caused the ire of Louvau, whom Muñiz initially dismissed but ultimately removed the segment from the air and brought Desafiando a los genios. Muñiz also introduced a section called El show de estrellas internacionales, where foreign talent was presented, whom he contracted to appear in a number of events and shows, including his latest addition Simpli la secretaria which aired Wednesdays. Despite the changes experienced by the introduction of color television in 1966, Muñiz did not bother with the new format and instead continued as usual. Eventually, El show del mediodía began airing in color. In 1966, La criada malcriada was converted in a film. Popular with the Puerto Rican diaspora, the adaptation set a new record in Columbia Pictures' Latin market. The movie also market the debut of Jacobo Morales as film director. Six out of the top ten programs in the ratings chart were made by Producciones Tommy Muñiz.

=== Color television ===
In 1966, color programming began airing. WAPA acquired 16mm filming equipment and began training the makeup department, while its staff visited stations that already used the technology abroad. The first show aired under this format was La premiere del domingo on February 27, 1966. With this, Puerto Rico became the third market to air color programs, after its homologues in Japan and parts of the United States. WKAQ, however, decided to wait until its new facilities were completed before introducing color programming. It also became the first place in Latin America to air in the format. Its affiliates, airing through channels 5 and 7, were retrofitted to air color retransmissions. Channel 11 made efforts to introduce the technology. Meanwhile, WITA-TV was introduced as channel 30 and used color programming as its debut gimmick but failed to beat WAPA-TV to the achievement. Like the initial introduction, this caused a surge in the sales of color television sets. Despite the programming also being accessible in the old black and white sets, efforts were made to sell the new devices. Initially, only pre-filmed shows aired in this format, but the local producers began efforts to acquire their own cameras. The first Puerto Rican production to air in color was a special starring singer Raphael, which aired at WKAQ on January 9, 1968. The Rambler Rendezvous was the first local show to regularly air in color.

Despite the skepticism about the format expressed by the foreign owners of WAPA-TV, the success of Desafiando a los genios resulted in it being given additional airtime, appearing during all weekdays. The segment was not scripted, to exploit the improv abilities of the actors. Performing under a variety of characters, Castro, Agrelot and Cristóbal Berrios served as the talent, while Morales was the host in charge of discussing a particular topic set for the day. The show was also a favorite of Pablo Casals, who revealed it in an interview with tabloid TeVe Guía. Afterwards, they hosted a segment to discuss the revelation, which lead to the violinist inviting the team to his house. Jimmy Díaz returned to television in Desafiando a los Genios, which also debuted Sunshine Logroño, Juan Manuel Lebrón and Adrían García. The move to a night time slot Wednesdays was targeted towards working-class men, with Muñiz working as host. The producer would continue performing this role irregularly. In 1967, Producciones Tommy Muñiz introduced Caras y caretas de las mujeres, El special de Corona, Viernes de gala and Gloria y Miguel. In the latter, Muñiz incorporated his sons to the programming.

Funded by Banco Popular, Muñiz travelled to New York to recruit several Puerto Rican talents for a special titled Hello, Puerto Rico hosted by him and aired at WAPA-TV. This would become the first satellite transmission to air live at the island. The following day WQAK responded by airing its first satellite transmission. Despite facing skepticism from the channel's administration, Muñiz debuted a sketch show titled Esto no tiene nombre on February 7, 1969, which satirized social and political issues and was a hit in the Friday nighttime slot. The show became known for airing the "Culebrazo", a faux news report about a revolution in Culebra which caused consternation for the serious way in it was portrayed (with false program interruptions and the legitimate news graphics), as a response for practices by the US Navy there. One of its characters, satirical politician Benigno Orante (interpreted by Samuel Medina), gained some write-in votes during the 1972 Puerto Rican general election.

On April 8, 1968, WKAQ-TV aired the first Puerto Rican telenovela in color, Recordar. The early 1970s brought a surge in the production of telenovelas, peaking with the success of El hijo de Ángela María. Towards the decade's end, Cristina Bazán became a hit both in television and in radio with its main theme. The resulting surge resulted in WKAQ-TV breaking the audience records and a new proliferation of the genre taking place. Over a dozen local productions were filmed, with several performers becoming established this way. On January 5, 1970, Ja-ja, ji-ji, jo-jo con Agrelot was introduced to replace El special de Corona, which was eventually moved to the primetime slot on Sundays and went on to figure near the top of the ratings for almost a decade. The show became known for hosting impersonation contests. In 1971, Borinquen canta was introduced, where Silverio Pérez was first contracted to appear in television after the original host left after a few episodes.

In 1970, WIRK-TV it was acquired by United Artists and became Rikavisión. Despite not being one of the main stations, it produced hits like Sandra Zaiter's Chiquilladas. After incurring in debt, the station was sold to producer Tommy Muñiz on $1.8 million. On March 23, 1978, a failed stunt that culminated in the death of Karl Wallenda was filmed by cameraman Santos López Malavé and aired live on WAPA-TV. The film of the event was acquired by CBS and then forwarded to NBC and ABC, where it was also aired. This was the first time that a local film was aired by the local stations headlined the news in these foreign networks. The Cerro Maravilla murders introduced an element of sensationalism to television in Puerto Rico. The investigation held by the Senate on the matter brought the attention of the majority of the population. An unexpected result was the popularization of attorney Rivera Cruz and of Cerro Maravilla as a touristic attraction in which the phrases used by him were converted into merchandise. During the late 1970s, Channel 11 entered into an economic crisis following the death of its previous owner, Ralph Pérez Perry. WAPA-TV was also facing issues due to the success of WKAQ-TV telenovelas. WRIK-TV was also facing debt and was sold by United Artists to producer Tommy Muñiz. Eventually, Channel 11 went bankrupt, and WRIK-TV was sold to foreign investors following a conflict with the government and advertisement issues. During the 1970s, a station in Mayagüez took over channel 3 and another in Aguadilla was assigned channel 12. Channel 11 was assigned to another metropolitan station.

=== Syndication, cable and foreign acquisition ===
In 1973, telenovela actor José Reymundí began a strike against Producciones Tommy Muñiz and in particular against its administrator Hernan Nigaglioni, claiming that he had been left out of a local production to favor foreigners. Soon afterwards, he was joined by more people as APATE joined and people like Castro decided not to cross the protest lines, while others like Candal actively joined the protests. Morales in turn decided to quit on the air. Only Alida Arizmendi challenged the protests. WAPA-TV decided not to intervene and distanced itself from the issue. In the end, Muñiz granted the demands of the protestors, such as health coverage or six-month contracts, but Reymundí was unable to benefit due to the cancellation of the production due to the strike. Producciones Tommy Muñiz was affected by it, with only productions like Esto no tiene nombre or Ja-ja, ji-ji, jo-jo con Agrelot surviving. Candal, Morales, Warrington, Carbia, Molina and García left to create Producciones Astra and joined Channel 7. This would only last for some years, since the company gained a reputation as supporting work syndicates and were avoided.

In April 1983, WKAQ-TV was acquired by foreign interests. In October 1987, WKAQ-TV was sold to another foreign group for $350 million. The acquisition eventually lead to the creation of the Telemundo Group, which became a major channel among the Latino audience of the states. This resulted in some local programming being retransmitted abroad. Following several changes in command, WAPA-TV was acquired by the General Electric subsidiary Pegasus, which would retain it for the next two decades. In 1986, Lorimar Telepicturee acquired Telecadenas Peréz Perry and placed TeleOnce on the frequency. However, the channel would pass to Malrite Communications Group and then Raycom Media, before being bought by Univision where it has stated so far.

In 1971, the Public Service Commission of Puerto Rico granted the first license to transmit through the cable format to Cable Television Corporation of Puerto Rico. The first attempt failed to become established and in 1977, the corporation was acquired by Cable TV of Greater San Juan. Other companies followed and around 200,000 clients held the basic programming by 1988. The local figures, feeling threatened by the new medium and assuming that cable programming was unavailable to the uneducated, decided to change its programming to include more sexual content and lowbrow comedies to comfort to stereotypes. Following the first attempt by Sunshine Logroño's Sunshine Café which received the support if advertisers shows like Raymond Arrieta's ¡Que vacilón! and El show de Raymond followed the same pattern. Súper Siete brought Antonio Sánchez in, who was placed along Marcano in La hora de oro. However, when Marcano departed, Sánchez was placed in El Cuartel de la Risa at Súper Siete, from which Gabriel Suau contracted him to perform a risqué comedy known as No te Duermas. The show received criticism for its brand of humor, but managed to secure its place due to the ratings. During the 1980s, MediaFax became the sole ratings evaluator in the market.

In 1990, prank show Marcano, el show emerged to rival the others. Talk shows also proliferated in Puerto Rico, as they did in other Latino programming, led by Carmen Jovet, Pedro Zervigón and Luis Francisco Ojeda. During this time, cable still lagged in popularity, present in only a fourth of households. In local channels, advertisers controlled the content of the programming, seeking ratings that would benefit them economically. In 1991, a movement led by the Catholic Church lead to a series of manifestations by groups that promoted Christian morality and feminism which resulted in local channel promising self-regulation following boycott against risqué programming by a number of advertisers and the government. In the process, A la cama con Porcel was cancelled and restrictions were placed on Sunshine's Café and No te duermas, the first of which was eventually suspended. However, these arrangements were brief and by 1993, the programming had reverted to their previous state with Sánchez, Marcano and Arrieta leading the ratings. When the owners of Súper Siete bought TeleOnce, channel 7 became a telemarketer and they moved its programming to the new acquisition. Others like No te duermas and prank show TVO moved to WKAQ-TV. Eventually, Arrieta's ¡Qué vacilón! would end this hegemony in late 1993. In 1994, El kiosko Budweiser and El gran Bejuco followed the pace of its predecessors. In 1994, WKAQ-TV celebrated the 40th anniversary of Puerto Rican television with a large party. TeleOnce aired a special titled 40 Kilates de Televisión, produced by Rafo Muñiz. Game show Dame un break also performed strongly in the ratings. Later in the decade, more of these comedies would be favored in the form of Minga y Petraca and Wilson Wilson, joined by the sitcom Mi familia and TVO. In 1995, the attacks attributed to the Chupacabra gained a prominent coverage in the media.

Despite the changes in demographics and programming, foreign acquisitions continued. In 1999, WAPA-TV was sold to LIN Broadcasting. By the turn of the century, cable had acquired 150,000 more clients, which combined with DTH surpassed 600,000.
