= What Happened to Santiago =

1989 film by Jacobo Morales

- Theatrical release poster
- Spanish: Lo que le pasó a Santiago
- Directed by: Jacobo Morales
- Written by: Jacobo Morales
- Produced by: Blanca Silvia Eró; Pedro Muñíz
- Starring: Tommy Muñiz; Gladys Rodríguez; Johanna Rosaly; René Monclova
- Cinematography: Augustin Cubano
- Edited by: Alfonso Borrell
- Music by: Pedro Rivera Toledo
- Production companies: Taleski Studios Inc. Dios los Cria Inc. Bacalao Inc.
- Release date: November 1989
- Running time: 105 minutes
- Country: Puerto Rico
- Language: Puerto Rican Spanish
- Budget: US$500,000

What Happened to Santiago (Spanish: Lo que le pasó a Santiago, Spanish: [ˈlo ke le paˈso a sanˈtjaɣo]) is a 1989 Puerto Rican comedy film written and directed by Jacobo Morales. The film tells the story of a recently retired widower who meets a mysterious young lady who disrupts his daily routines.

It was the first and only Puerto Rican production to be nominated for an Academy Award for Best Foreign Language Film. In 2011 AMPAS revised its rules to make films from U.S. territories such as Puerto Rico ineligible for the Foreign Language Film award.

== Plot ==
Santiago, a widowed man, visits his wife's grave at the cemetery. Near a movie filming location, Santiago encounters a mysterious woman. She is very pleasant and engages him in conversation. They exchange gifts, but upon parting ways, she leaves without revealing her name, leaving Santiago to ponder if he will ever see her again. They cross paths once more, and the woman, now identified as Angelina, continues to be amiable. Angelina discloses that she has been observing Santiago and mentions witnessing him mailing a letter to someone.

Santiago frequently argues with his daughter, primarily because she is undergoing a divorce, which he opposes. Later, during a dispute between his daughter and her husband in the presence of their young son, Santiago distracts the boy with conversation about snow, reminiscing about the only time he witnessed snow when it was airlifted to Puerto Rico. Santiago searches for employment but faces disinterest from an interviewer due to his age.

During their third encounter, Santiago and Angelina enjoy traditional guitar music and dancing. They later take a boat ride through a waterway in a park. Angelina exudes constant cheerfulness. Meanwhile, Santiago's daughter remains contentious. At the airport, she informs Santiago of her plans to move to New York City for three months, leaving her son with her husband. However, her husband fails to show up, prompting her to leave the child with Santiago before departing. As Santiago leaves with his somber grandson, the boy's father arrives to collect him.

One day, Santiago receives an unexpected call from Angelina on his landline. He had not given her his number, and she explains that she had to call every person in the phone book with his name to reach him. They arrange to meet in San Juan. Santiago's son, Eddie, confesses his depression and reveals that he gave away his guitar. Santiago encourages him, expressing a desire to travel together for therapeutic reasons. Santiago also confides in Eddie about meeting Angelina but admits to hiring an investigator to learn more about her due to his concerns about her mysteriousness.

Early the next morning, Santiago visits Angelina's grand Spanish-style home. As they share breakfast, Angelina reveals her family history, including her grandfather's involvement in the Spanish-American War. Santiago reciprocates with details about his own life. They spend the day together until caught in a rainstorm, prompting them to retreat to Angelina's bedroom. There, she offers Santiago a massage with rubbing alcohol, revealing to him that she is a ghost.

Despite this revelation, they declare their love for each other before parting ways. Santiago drives home in the rain, reflecting on seeing Angelina's home and garden in his dreams. His car gets stuck in the mud, but he manages to free it using a stick he finds nearby. He arrives home to find his anxious son waiting for him, describing Angelina's home as the most beautiful he's ever seen.

After recovering from pneumonia, Santiago is visited by the investigator, who shares disturbing information about Angelina's past. She was Lela, a woman who had endured a tragic life, including giving up her illegitimate child and shooting her father. Santiago recalls reading about her in the newspapers. Despite this revelation, Santiago continues his relationship with Angelina, keeping her secret to himself.

== Cast ==
- Tommy Muñiz - Santiago Rodríguez
- Gladys Rodríguez - Angelina
- Jacobo Morales - Aristides Esquilín
- René Monclova - Eddie
- Johanna Rosaly - Nereida
- Roberto Vigoreaux - Gerardo

== Production ==
Jacobo Morales wrote the script while working on the play Los muchachos de la alegría, an adaptation of a Neil Simon script, which featured Tommy Muñiz. As they were in rehearsals, Morales realized that Muñiz was the "singular performer" he wanted for his film project. He said in a 2014 interview that since he had the idea "very clear, I wrote it really fast; like a little over a month". Morales invited Muñiz' son, Pedro, to serve as associate producer while Morales' wife, Blanca Silvia Eró, served as executive producer. Morales also chose Gladys Rodríguez to play opposite Muñiz, for considering her a very "ductile" actress with which he had worked for decades before. Morales said of Rodríguez, "the experiences with her had been very positive and we had good communication. Her role not only suited her for her physicality, but also for her temperament."

Morales described the film as a very "simple" film with "great performances from Tommy, Gladys, and René Monclova", who played Muñíz' son. The production had a budget of $500,000. Although Morales wrote the script fairly quickly, filming was delayed for around 40 days. According to Morales, at the time it was the only one of his feature films that had gone over its initially planned shooting schedule. It was filmed in Old San Juan and Santa Isabel.

== Release ==
The film's original release was delayed because of the passage of Hurricane Hugo in September 1989. It was ultimately released in November of the same year. After receiving critical acclaim, the film was also exhibited in various international festivals, including the Festival de Cine Iberoamericano de Huelva in Spain, the Latin American Film Festival in Washington, and the Festival du Cinéma Espagnol de Nantes in France. According to Morales, he wasn't "thinking in success, but in a story that grabbed my attention. I always try to do everything in function of the story. The star is the film".

== Reception ==
Lo que le pasó a Santiago was generally well received by critics and audiences. Although it doesn't have an official rating on Rotten Tomatoes because of the lack of certified critics reviews, it still holds an approval rating of 81% among the audience based on 417 ratings. In 1990, the film was nominated for Best Foreign Language Film at the 62nd Academy Awards. According to Morales, it was associate producer, Pedro Muñiz, who prompted them to submit the film for consideration. Before submitting it to the Academy, they had to budget the addition of English subtitles, which they did in "record time" and the film was successfully submitted before the January 5, 1990 deadline. However, it lost to Giuseppe Tornatore's Cinema Paradiso. Muñiz's performance in Lo que le pasó a Santiago lead to the interest of TNT, which contracted him for the role of Tomás Ontiveros in Crazy from the Heart along Rubén Blades.

=== Awards ===
Award	Year	Category	Recipient	Result
Academy Awards	1990	Best Foreign Language Film	What Happened to Santiago	Nominated
Premio ACE	1991	Cinema - Best Director	Jacobo Morales	Won

== See also ==
- Cinema of Puerto Rico
- List of films set in Puerto Rico
- List of Puerto Ricans in the Academy Awards
- List of submissions to the 62nd Academy Awards for Best Foreign Language Film
- List of Puerto Rican submissions for the Academy Award for Best Foreign Language Film
