= Rafo Muñiz =

Puerto Rican actor and comedian (born 1956)

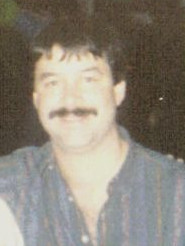
Rafo Muñiz in 1989

Rafael Emilio Muñiz García de la Noceda, better known as Rafo Muñiz (born September 13, 1956), is a Puerto Rican actor, comedian, director, and producer of television shows and concerts. The son of pioneering comic actor and producer Tommy Muñiz, Rafo's acting career began in the role of "Miguel" in "Gloria y Miguel", which aired on WAPA in Puerto Rico. After graduating high school, he starred alongside his father as his father's son in law in the sitcom Los García (The Garcias), also on WAPA, during the late 1970s. From there on, Rafo had on and off work as an actor, but by 1985, he had become a game show host at WAPA-TV. By that era also, he established a company named Promotores Latinos, where he performs as company President and main show producer. Promotores Latinos is now known as ProLat Entertainment.

Since the 1980s, Muñiz has been one of the top music promoters/managers in Puerto Rico, and his firm, ProLat Entertainment, has represented artists such as Jennifer Lopez, Rubén Blades, Olga Tañón, Gilberto Santa Rosa, and others in their concerts in Puerto Rico, Venezuela and Panama. Tanon split from his company in 2002, and Muñiz sued her for breach of contract. He quickly signed another Merengue singer, Melina León and TV personality, Silverio Pérez, to be represented by him. He also represented the late Luis Raúl, a Puerto Rican stand up comedian, and singer Jailene Cintrón. Some of his projects in the mainland U.S. include "ViVa Puente" a star-studded tribute to the late Puerto Rican superstar Tito Puente in New York, L.A., Miami and Dallas. He has produced concerts at Carnegie Hall, Lincoln Center, the Jackie Gleason Theater, and Madison Square Garden, among other venues. Currently, he is the manager of salsa music singer Gilberto Santa Rosa, latin pop singer Yolandita Monge, and author Uka Green.

== Early life ==
He and Manuel had a number of pets including a monkey, a snake, a pair of caimans and a white rat, and as the second continued gathering animals, they created a makeshift zoo in their backyard.

== Entertainment career ==
On September 21, 1976, Producciones Tommy Muñiz debuted Los García, a sitcom reflecting the increasingly changing dynamic of Puerto Rican families during the ongoing industrial surge. This marked the first time since the strike that a new production was rolled by the producer and also marked his return to the screen as an actor. It also featured his son, Rafo Muñiz, in a supporting role. Within months, the show reached the top place in the ratings. Rafo Muñiz was in charge of promotions for the station and produced two shows, Los pupilos and Latino, later Son del Caribe, which introduced Héctor Marcano and Roberto Vigoreaux to television.

Entering the 1980s, Marcano was contracted by Muñiz to appear in two shows at WRIK-TV, Los pupilos and Latino. The first was a comedy, in which he depicted one of several college students. The second, a formal show where he served as host and interviewer. Tommy Muñiz made his return to Puerto Rican television in August 1989, producing family sitcom El papá de mi papá and the comedy music show Carcajadas y algo más (along Rafo) for WAPA-TV, remaining invested in these projects for over a year.

Eventually, Rafo approached him about a return to theatre with a play named Los muchachos de la alegría, which was accepted and Morales was brought in to direct and as part of the cast. Agrelot was initially considered to lead the cast, but his issues with scripted work lead to the reconciliation of Muñiz and Cordero after two decades of estrangement. The play was a hit and moved from Bellas Artes to Teatro Tapia and then left San Juan to be shown at Mayagüez and Ponce, totaling over 30 shows.

Following the last show of the play Los muchachos de la alegría, Morales approached Tommy Muñiz about entering the film industry as the titular character. Morales began the process with $45,000 acquired from the Institute of Puerto Rican Culture. Pedro Muñiz had accepted the initial offering, having managed to secure a flow of income with his negotiations in the sale of WRIK-TV, but remained skeptical that the film could be capable of gathering earnings. Morales and the younger Muñiz managed to secure $100,000 more, a fifth part of the final cost of the project, by holding around 120 presentations for potential investors.

Filming began with Santiago, Angelina and the other characters being adapted to the personalities of the actors, with the initiative of Morales. After those funds became depleted, a loan was granted by the Banco Gubernamental de Fomento. Filming did not stop despite these arrangements, extending during seven weeks with work days ranging from 14-20 daily hours. Edition and promotional arrangements then took place. The local debut was delayed due to the passing of Hurricane Hugo during September, which also lead to it being a hit during the recovery period.

The staff received an invitation to present a dubbed version of the film at the Latin American Film Festival held on Washington D.C. on October 26, 1989. The film was then showed at the Festival de Cine Iberoamericano and the Festival de Cine Español, both in Spain. During these events, they perceived that the international public could identify with the blue collar problems of Santiago. Having been showed in time for the 1990 Academy Awards, the staff decided to enter that year's competition and added subtitles to the film within the few months available before the January 1990 deadline. This process was concurrent with the international post-production and Pedro Muñiz traveling to Hollywood, where he reached an agreement with a purported company interested in acquiring the North American rights and which claimed that it would open The New York Shakespeare Festival, only to be later revealed as a fraud.

This was one of two such incidents, with the other being a phantom company that disappeared after arrangements were made for international distribution. Despite the interest of the diaspora, distribution outside of Puerto Rico was hindered by these events. Following reunions with members of the Academy, Pedro Muñiz returned and received a $50,000 grant from the Legislature of Puerto Rico. On February 14, 1990, the producer was unable to sleep and took the initiative of contacting the Academy to know the nominees, among which was Lo que le pasó a Santiago, which he took with euphoria along his father. Morales was more contemplative in receiving the news. More showings were scheduled following the announcement.

The staff participated in the director's dinner, during which they were approached by Stanley Kramer and discussed Cyrano de Bergerac which he had directed and lead to José Ferrer becoming the only Latin American to win an Oscar in the "Best Actor" category. Others, like Steven Spielberg and Gregory Peck, commented favorably about the film. During the ceremony, they arrived late due to their driver's inexperience, which lead to them arriving during the headliner's parade. Ultimately, Cinema Paradiso won the Oscar in the category. The elder Muñiz couple returned to the hotel with their grandson, Pedrito Muñiz, while the Morales couple and Pedro Muñiz attended the Governor's Ball. The project ended costing $500,000 in total, with all of the debts being successfully paid.

With Expo 92 being held in Spain, he and Rafo produced a special called De tal palo tal astilla, Rafo y don Tommy en Sevilla. Two other specials, Puerto Rico y sus islas (about local culture and geography) and the compendium on popular culture Latitud 18.5, were also produced this year. A sequel to the first titled Las otras islas de Puerto Rico, a piece on the houses of historical Puerto Rican figures (La casa feliz) and a Christmas special (La Navidad con don Tommy) were aired the following year. Pedro became responsible for Producciones Tommy Muñiz.

In 1994, he produced the special, ¿A quién no le falta un tornillo?., where his father and Agrelot made appearances along several other figures. Eventually, Rafo Muñiz convinced his father to participate in another special, this one dedicated to him, titled Los 75 años de don Tommy filmed for WAPA-TV on February 3, 1997, before a live audience that filled the venue. In it, both his family and former employees and colleagues played homage to his career.

TeleOnce aired a special titled 40 Kilates de Televisión, produced by Rafo Muñiz. In 1993, Muñiz organized a play titled La vida en un beso in which he performed along his father and Giselle Blondet. A series of special revivals of Los García featured a now-divorced Godofredo with the first airing on August 28, 1994 and the last on May 4, 1995.

== See also ==
- List of Puerto Ricans
