= Tommy Muñiz =

Puerto Rican actor and producer (1922–2009)

- Born: Lucas Tomás Muñiz Ramírez; 4 February 1922; Ponce, Puerto Rico
- Died: 15 January 2009 (aged 86); Hato Rey, Puerto Rico
- Known for: Actor, comedian, Host, businessman

Lucas Tomás Muñiz Ramírez (4 February 1922 – 15 January 2009), better known as Tommy Muñiz, was a Puerto Rican comedy and drama actor, media producer, businessman and network owner. He is considered to be one of the pioneering figures of the television business in Puerto Rico. Although Muñíz was born in Ponce, he was raised in the capital city of San Juan where he studied. Muñíz developed an interest in the entertainment business thanks to his father Tomas and to his uncle and godfather Félix Muñíz, who also produced radio programs. Muñiz was a successful radio producer in Puerto Rico during the mid- to late 1940s. Five of his radio programs -comedies for which he was often the scriptwriter, sometimes with the assistance of Sylvia Rexach- would consistently earn a strong following, as judged by the attendance to personal presentations of the artists featured in them. He was responsible for introducing more than a dozen new artists to the media. He bought Radio Luz 1600 (WLUZ-AM) a radio station in Bayamón, Puerto Rico During the first years of commercial television in Puerto Rico, and after a brief period during which revenues from his radio productions trickled down, Muñiz opted to start producing television programs as well. During the 1940s, when radios where ubiquitous in Puerto Rican households, Muñiz's radio scripts then became increasingly successful, beginning with El colegio de la alegría, in which he performed along José Miguel Agrelot. This was followed by La familia Pérez, Adelita, la secretaria, Gloria y Miguel and ¡Qué sirvienta!, all of which featured him in some function. He was producer or executive producer for dozens of television programs and specials between 1955 and 1995. At one time in the early 1960s, five programs produced by Muñiz were in the top five television rankings in local audience surveys. One of the programs even spawned a 1967 film, "La Criada Malcriada", starring Velda González, Shorty Castro and Muñiz, among others. He is credited for producing most of José Miguel Agrelot's television programs during his career. He is also credited with discovering and promoting other television artists as well, particularly Otilio Warrington. In the 1970s he was the owner of WRIK-TV Channel 7 in Ponce.

In the late 1970s, Muñiz revived a comedy format that he had successfully used in three previous radio and television productions, the family sitcom. He produced and acted in a comedy series named Los García together with his real-life son Rafo Muñiz, and with longtime friend Gladys Rodríguez. Also starring were William Gracia as Pepín, Gina Beveraggi as Gini, Edgardo Rubio as Junito, Manela Bustamante as Doña Tony, Emma Rosa Vincenty as Doňa Cayetana, and a number of additional actors in various roles. The show became the most successful television show in Puerto Rican history, having a mostly successful six-year run and staying for three of those years at the top of local television ratings. During the late 1970s and early 1980s, Muñiz was the owner of a radio station (Radio Luz WLUZ) and a television channel (Teleluz). Both were named after his wife, Luz María. In 1988, he became one of the largest minority owners of another channel, TeleOnce. In 1989, he and Rodríguez reunited to act in the movie Lo que le Pasó a Santiago, directed by Jacobo Morales, a longtime friend of Muñíz. The film was nominated for an Academy Award for Best Foreign Language Film becoming the first and only Puerto Rican film so far to do so. As a consequence of his part in Lo que le Pasó a Santiago, Muñiz was selected to act in the 1991 television comedy film Crazy From The Heart, directed by Thomas Schlamme and featuring Christine Lahti and Rubén Blades. In the movie, Muñiz played Blades' father, a Mexican peasant with a proclivity for setting billboards on fire as a protest. The movie was eventually broadcast by Turner Network Television (TNT).

== Early years ==
Muñiz Ramírez was born in Ponce, Puerto Rico on 4 February 1922, to Don Tomás Muñíz Souffront and Monserrate "Nena" Ramírez. His father, Don Tomás, was a marketing executive who later became the administrator (and eventual owner) of various radio stations, as well as a radio producer. Muñiz was born during the 1920s, the same decade when radio first arrived to Puerto Rico, to a household of several siblings including Carmen, Marjorie, Nellie, Andy, Néstor and Nilza. Early in his life, Muñiz suffered from rickets. Despite this, he gained interest in eventually becoming a race jockey. His father Tómas Muñiz, Sr. had pursued several venues of substainance including real estate sales, while his mother Nena was sickly. He was an insecure child, which was reflected in issues at schools and a number of expulsions. Witnessing this, his uncle Félix Muñiz decided to take him to the West Indies Advertising Company (WIAC) where he worked. The institution would become a radio station in 1942, and when his uncle died, His father Tómas was selected to fill the vacancy. Since the age of 12, Muñiz would be the tasked with several functions within WIAC. Under José A. Torres Martinó, he learned to write scripts and wrote Francisquito Rosales y Miel de Aveja along his mentor. In this, he performed as the effeminate titular character. In 1939, Muñiz met Luz María García de la Noceda while coursing high school. During the following five years he approached her, eventually convincing her after appearing at her house with a gift. They married in 1944, living in poverty for some time. Afterwards, Muñiz, Sr. loaned a large house from the owners of WIAC which became known as La Casona.

He started by being the messenger of the marketing firm where his father and uncle used to work, and eventually became a radio scriptwriter. Muñiz sold his car, a 1932 red Ford, and acquired an Underwood typewriter in which he wrote his scripts. Meanwhile, he survived by raising chickens for his parents in law which served to produce eggs to sell and would also be sold themselves. The couple moved to Santa Rita in Río Piedras and had three children, Tómad Gerardo, Félix Antonio and Mario Andrés. Muñiz loaned a building at Santurce, which would serve as his workplace, the first local independent production entity known as Producciones Tommy Muñiz. The services provided grew to include representation and the hosting of activities by his artists, but focused on his radio productions. Among them was Sylvia Rexach, who also collaborated in writing scripts. Jacobo Morales would be among the public at WAPA Radio where La familia Pérez was recorded, since he knew a member of the cast. The live performance of the radio scripts was popular and depending the nature of the work, required selective the public. However, his shows would be concurrent with Diplo, usually falling second to them. Muñoz would recruit Paquito Cordero to serve as Andy Tenorio in Las adventuras de Andy Tenorio, a show that was a parody of the Archie comics and included a Diplo impersonator. The show would give birth to the Yoyo Boing character that defined the career of his interpreter, Luis Antonio Rivera. At the moment, Puerto Rican society was being forced to adapt to an industrial movement that replaced the agrarian economy that prevailed during the early years of American colonialism. It was, however, also a time of political unrest caused by the Cold War, the Korean War and the adoption of the Commonwealth and the reaction that the Nationalist Party had to it. This led to a focus in the local middle class, from which Muñiz drew inspiration in his scripts. He created characters based on the average working class and placed them in every day settings. The first example was Violeta Flores, a representation of the jíbaros that were leaving the rural areas to settle in urban zones amidst the change and which was featured in a radio show in which he played a man named Tadeo.

== Television producer ==
=== Variety shows and sitcoms ===
Muñiz was concerned with the arrival of the new medium, assuming it would seriously hit radio and not expecting to have a role in it. The medium was received with some skepticism fueled by reports of losses abroad, but had a positive reception which eventually convinced most of its doubters. Radio suffered an economic decline when most of its established figures left to work television and the sponsors followed them. His work soon lost its audience, with La familia Pérez at risk of disappearing and the radio stations in turmoil over the loss of advertisement. The family had moved to Floral Park near his parents, while he was increasingly considering how to deal with his future in other ways. While radio stations loaned their facilities for other purposes to survive, Muñiz decided to open a pet shop named Zoo Pet Shop. On 19 April 1955, the couple had its fifth child, Manuel Alberto. That same day, Muñiz received a call from WKAQ. Having practiced for the call in case that it came, he took the offer. His father had advised him to avoid appearing overly enthusiastic in his response in order to avoid appearing desperate. Producciones Tommy Muñiz was struggling Cordero and Agrelot were already involved in television shows Mímicas del Monte, Mapy y Papi and Capitán Colgate. Muñiz began working as a script writer for Casino Tropical, a comedy segment of the half-hour El show de shows. Despite the family still living in poverty and he still selling animals for a living, Producciones Tommy Muñiz moved to Miramar in the large property that had been loaned by his parents years before, La Casona. While attending the pet shop, he received a call from WKAQ-TV to replace Agrelot at Capitán Colgate, leaving the business in charge of his sister. Wondering what to create, Muñiz examined WKAQ's programming, consulted his father and summoned his co-workers to La Casona. Two shows where then created, a television adaptation of El colegio de la alegría and A reirse con Ola, which aired in a prime time slot on Wednesdays and was hosted by Yoyo Boing and Cordero. WAPA-TV responded by creating Una hora conmigo hosted by Myrta Silva. Conducted by Mario Pabón, A reirse con Ola peaked in the rating charts, which earned Muñiz personal congratulations from Ángel Ramos. It also won the recognition for "Best Comedy Show" and Yoyo Boing won "Best Comedian", while also serving to propel figures such as Helga Avilés and Eddie Miró, while its music interludes served as the debut of Cortijo y su combo.

=== Adapting radio IPs ===
Agrelot returned to Puerto Rico during their peak and became the centerpiece of El colegio de la alegría, which had been recreated with him in mind. Muñiz had made several changes to El profesor Colgate to focus it on Agrelot's forte, giving rise to this adaptation. Producciones Tommy Muñiz also traveled Puerto Rico and made live presentations in a number of places and fiestas patronales for additional revenue. During these tours, the group became acquainted with several food establishments and where involved in several mishaps during the weekends, eventually adopting the name of "Caravana del Monte" gaining patronage from the Del Monte brand. A reírse con Ola changed names several times, twice due to branding in the cases of A reírse con Fab and Diviértase con Fab and once to highlight its characters in A reírse con Yoyo. Muñiz, however, was annoyed by the involvement of the advertisers in his shows. On 1 August 1955, Muñiz took over La taberna India after Rivero left the show. Américo Castellanos suggested to play the female character of Floripondia, a move that was considered in poor taste by the administration of WKAQ, but went ahead due to the producer's insistence. With the cast completed by regulars from other Producciones Tommy Muñiz performers, the show became a hit. A reimagined La familia Pérez named Hogar, dulce hogar replaced Mímicas del Monte, featuring the comedian debut of Shorty Castro and headlined by Muñiz and Luz María Font, who was recruited after casually stumbling upon the producer. The show climbed to the first spot in the ratings, remaining there for some time. During its peak, the script was modified to accommodate the pregnancy of Font, with the public responding strongly to the situation. Parallel to this, the couple had their first daughter, Luz Consuelo on 18 October 1957. However, two weeks later his mother died suddenly. Afterwards, the couple had its second daughter, Hilda María. Despite local television introducing more foreign programming, Producciones Tommy Muñiz continued unabated producing Lotus lo divierte (his first for WAPA-TV), Garata deportiva, El chiste Camel, Telefiesta de la tarde and Reina por un día between 1956 and 1959. Initially supported by three advertisers, Telefiesta de la tarde included the participation of Rivera, Agrelot, Cordero, Castro and Miró among others. He produced programs for both major stations at once, which benefited programs like the latter two, which were able to dominate in ratings despite moving. During this time, Muñiz kept his programs relevant by pitching them to the other channel, as was the case with Hogar, dulce hogar which returned to WKAQ-TV. Ultimately, Telefiesta was the only program to survive this period. He also briefly produced Desafiando a los genios for the nascent WKBM. Despite the introduction of taping during the 1960s, Muñiz continued producing his shows live.

In 1961, Muñiz appeared in Damián Rosa's Romance en Puerto Rico. Shorty Castro was part of the entertainment in this business with Googie Santana and others. By 1963, Muñiz dominated the daytime ratings, but Desafiando a los genios remained his only show in the nighttime block, hosted by Agrelot, Castro and Osvaldo Seda as the titular "geniuses". Muñiz then debuted a 15-minute segment known as La criada malcriada in Telefiesta de la tarde (with the help of his father on character design) with Velda González as the titular character Azucena, a rude maid, and Jacobo Morales and Agrelot in supporting roles. Aimed at the middle class and originally conceived as a nighttime show, a pilot was filmed at WKAQ but problems with the station's protocol led to it being pitched to WAPA from its own studio. There, however, it was repurposed to avoid competing with the imported shows. During this time, his father also died, leaving him without his closest advisor in the business and personal confidant. Afterwards, Muñiz decided to leave La Casona behind and moved to Férnandez Juncos Avenue. With La criada malcriada becoming popular and Agrelot also hosting the comedy news segment Encabuya y vuelve y tira, Telefiesta en la tarde became the first daytime show to become a leader in ratings. The segment brought an increase in advertisers and despite Norma Candal taking over the role of maid as Petunia, its success continued and it lasted for 17 years. It also led to a spinoff, Criada a la orden, produced by González herself and which became the first comedy aired in color. Eventually, the show was renamed El show del mediodía. In 1966, Efraín López Neris suggested a candid camera segment to Muñiz and Modestti. After being ignored, he filmed a pilot for the concept titled La cámara cómica. Muñiz was convinced and the show would become his latest to succeed at the ratings chart. WAPA-TV's Panchito Menéndez y su gran show del mediodía was the first hour-long noon show in local television. Tommy Muñiz produced the second and exploiting the lack of exclusivity, exported Telefiesta to WAPA-TV (while dominating the ratings with several shows based at WKAQ-TV) on 29 December 1958, to replace Menéndez. Hogar, dulce hogar, El colegio de la alegría and La taberna India, also completed similar moves.

=== Telenovelas and strike, WRIK-TV ===
Producciones Tommy Muñiz also began producing telenovelas, with Las almas no tienen color as its maiden project. This was followed by Historia de dos mujeres, Cuando los hijos condenan, Los Juanes, María del Mar, El silencio nos condena, Mami santa, Claudia y Virginia and Llanto para una mujer. Despite the latter facing issues with the increasingly successful telenovelas of WKAQ-TV, Muñiz went on to also produce Marta for WAPA-TV in 1973. However, this production actor José Reymundí began a strike against Producciones Tommy Muñiz and in particular against its administrator Hernan Nigaglioni, claiming that he had been left out of a local production to favor foreigners. Soon afterwards, he was joined by more people as APATE joined and people like Castro decided not to cross the protest lines, while others like Candal actively joined the protests. Morales in turn decided to quit on the air. Only Alida Arizmendi challenged the protests. WAPA-TV decided not to intervene and distanced itself from the issue. In the end, Muñiz granted the demands of the protestors, such as health coverage or six month contracts, but Reymundí was unable to benefit due to the cancellation of the production due to the strike. Producciones Tommy Muñiz was affected by it, with only productions like Esto no tiene nombre or Ja-ja, ji-ji, jo-jo con Agrelot surviving. Candal, Morales, Warrington, Carbia, Molina and García left to create Producciones Astra and joined Channel 7. This would only last for some years, since the company gained a reputation as supporting work syndicates and were avoided. On 21 September 1976, Producciones Tommy Muñiz debuted Los García, a sitcom reflecting the increasingly changing dynamic of Puerto Rican families during the ongoing industrial surge. This marked the first time since the strike that a new production was rolled by the producer and also marked his return to the screen as an actor. It also featured his son, Rafo Muñiz, in a supporting role. Within months, the show reached the top place in the ratings.

When another foreign group purchased WAPA-TV, the new owners began implanting different moral standards that led to censoring some characters and modified the time slots. Unsatisfied with this, Producciones Tommy Muñiz moved his productions to Telecadena Pérez Perry. Muñiz then bought WRIK-TV, a small station but with good coverage, from United Artists on a $1.8 million offer. In order to establish the newly named Teleluz, he intended to dedicate it to sports and pursued the rights of transmission for the 1979 Pan American Games. However, governor Carlos Romero Barceló requested voiding the auction where WRIK-TV acquired the rights so that the event could air through WIPR-TV, noting that otherwise they would be cancelled. Muñiz was unsatisfied with the request and filed an injunction and lawsuit, which was won three years after the Games had been held. Considering it a bad investment, Nigaglioni refused to join Muñiz in the purchase of Rikavisión and both grew apart. With the death of a Ralph Pérez Perry, the channel began experiencing administrative and economic issues culminating the move after seven months. Eventually, these combined with the inability of WAPA-TV's new programming to compete with WKAQ-TV and led to a deal that was favorable for Muñiz's return. However, as the owner of a channel he was not allowed to work as a broker in both places and Producciones Tommy Muñiz sold material that was already filmed to the station. In this space, Muñiz aired Tommy, Encabuya... y vuelve y tira and El colegio de la alegría. The original plan for WRIK-TV was abandoned and a variety of genres were seen in its first shows, La cámara cómica, Esto sí tiene nombre, Cocina con Henry Corona, ' 'Parece increible, Festivalito, Musicalísimo, El show de Carlos Busquets, Con Sandra and El show de Walter Mercado. Parece increible later known as Haciendo historia, a novelty show first hosted by Muñiz and later by Agrelot and María Falcón, was a hit. A commentary show hosted by José Antonio "El Profe" Ortiz, was originally co-hosted by Mariano Artau and Carmen Jovet. Later, Jovet was moved to the news segment Cámara Siete. A morning segment, Despierta Puerto Rico, would later complete the news programming. Cámara Siete would gather a number of exclusives, including special programming surrounding the Falklands War and the arrival of Deborah Carthy-Deu after winning Miss Universe. His son, Pedro Muñiz, was in charge of administrative duties. Rafo Muñiz was in charge of promotions for the station and produced two shows, Los pupilos and Latino, later Son del Caribe, which introduced Héctor Marcano and Roberto Vigoreaux to television. After Channel 11 went bankrupt, Los Rayos Gamma moved to WRIK-TV, signaling the end of an estrangement with Morales. The group debuted on 1 November 1981. The arrangement with WAPA-TV was ended in February 1981, when all of the productions were relocated to reinforce WRIK-TV, which had become the only local channel in Puerto Rican hands with the bankruptcy of Channel 11. A new noon show named Mediodía en el Siete was complemented by the arriving comedy Encabuya... y vuelve y tira, and introduced others such as El derecho de lavar which debuted the character of Epifanio. El show de Lourdes y Carlos was responsible for popularizing Lourdes Robles as a singer. Agrelot was placed in charge of the comedy Cosas del alcalde. Children's programming was first in charge of Sandra Seiter, but later introduced Tamborito y Colorina and Chiquimundo, the latter of which marked the debut of José Vega as in shows directed towards that audience. With a loose concept Los siete del Siete would take over the prime time slot Thursdays, and be host by a number of local talents including Agrelot, Morales, Olivo, Avellanet, Jovet and Logroño. Later, this space would be taken by the trova-centered La feria del Siete. The channel also acquired exclusivity of the investigation that the Senate of Puerto Rico held on the Cerro Maravilla murders, which established a ratings record for the channel. The case took place in the mountain housing antennas that transmitted WKRIK's programming and one of the technicians was a witness, in the ensuing coverage the image of Romero Barceló was linked to the controversy. All foreign programming was suspended, while the channel's programming revolved around the event. The process extended for months and it brought political tension against those involved in the transmission leading to several bomb warnings being issued against the channel, while the Muñiz family was directly threatened along "Profe". In 1982, Muñiz sued MediaFax, the company responsible for registering television ratings, citing manipulation of the numbers. This eventually gained interest of the Senate, which launched its own investigation. However, the relation with advertisers was affected and Muñiz opted to sell the station in 1985 to avoid bankruptcy in exchange for the continuation of the original employees as part of an arrangement made by Pedro. The move ended the lawsuit, WKRIK-TV then became WSTE-TV and its commercial name became Súper Siete. The arrangement, however, limited Producciones Tommy Muñiz to the station until 1989.

=== Later years ===
Disappointed at the status of the industry and the proliferation of what he regarded as lowbrow comedy, Muñiz entered a semi-retirement and spent most of his days at Culebra. Eventually, Rafo approached him about a return to theatre with a play named Los muchachos de la alegría, which was accepted and Morales was brought in to direct and as part of the cast. Agrelot was initially considered to lead the cast, but his issues with scripted work led to the reconciliation of Muñiz and Cordero after two decades of estrangement. The play was a hit and moved from Bellas Artes to Teatro Tapia and then left San Juan to be shown at Mayagüez and Ponce, totaling over 30 shows. Following the last show, Morales approached Muñiz about entering the film industry as the titular character in Lo que le pasó a Santiago. Pedro Muñiz was brought aboard as producer. Muñiz also made his return to Puerto Rican television in August 1989, producing family sitcom El papá de mi papá and the comedy music show Carcajadas y algo más (along Rafo) for WAPA-TV, remaining invested in these projects for over a year. On 14 February 1990, the film became the first local project to be nominated to the Academy Awards, competing in the "Best Foreign Film" category. During the director's dinner, his work as an actor was complimented by Gregory Peck. His performance in Lo que le pasó a Santiago led to the interest of TNT, which contracted him for the role of Tomás Ontiveros in Crazy from the Heart along Rubén Blades. During the filming of the film, the improvisation of a court scene gathered the favor of director Thomas Schlamme. The film debuted on 19 August 1991.

During the early 1990s, Muñiz was publicly critical of comedy shows that used war as a topic. In February 1991, Muñiz returned to WAPA-TV and produced Los primeros, a compendium of his old shows with additional commentary that lasted for some months. He followed this with his first miniseries, Nadie lo va a saber, which aired during the second week of May 1991. With Expo 92 being held in Spain, he and Rafo produced a special called De tal palo tal astilla, Rafo y don Tommy en Sevilla. Two other specials, Puerto Rico y sus islas (about local culture and geography) and the compendium on popular culture Latitud 18.5, were also produced this year. A sequel to the first titled Las otras islas de Puerto Rico, a piece on the houses of historical Puerto Rican figures (La casa feliz) and a Christmas special (La Navidad con don Tommy) were aired the following year. Pedro became responsible for Producciones Tommy Muñiz. When Malrite Communications sold channel 7, Muñiz (who still owned 20% of the stocks) filed a lawsuit due to not being informed of the move, winning it and ending his relationship with the station. On 20 May 1993, Muñiz returned to theatre in Rafo's play En un beso la vida, performing along his son and Giselle Blondet. In 1994, TeleOnce aired a special titled 40 Kilates de Televisión, produced by Rafo Muñiz to commemorate the 40th anniversary of the medium, where he performed along his son. The following month, he hosted another special, ¿A quién no le falta un tornillo?. A series of special revivals of Los García followed, with the first airing on 28 August 1994, and the last on 4 May 1995. WIPR-TV displayed interest in reviving the series, but Muñiz declined.

On 1 July 1995, Manuel Muñiz died, causing an emotional crisis in his father. It wasn't until 3 September that he made a return to the media in a special edition of El colegío de la alegría titled Cuarenta años no son na' reprising his role. On 19 October, another revival took place, this time Esto sigue sin nombre, based on Esto no tiene nombre. Despite resuming his work, Muñiz did not abandon this depression, selling his Culebra house and walked away of television for years. Eventually, Rafo Muñiz convinced his father to participate in another special, this one dedicated to him, titled Los 75 años de don Tommy filmed for WAPA-TV on 3 February 1997, before a live audience that filled the venue. In it, both his family and former employees and colleagues played homage to his career. On 7 September 1998, WIPR-TV began airing Noches de ayer, where Muñiz introduced episodes of his past work. The show would later be renamed Imagines and be hosted by Agrelot as well. On 19 November 1998, Muñiz sold Radio Luz. After suffering a heart attack on 31 March 1999, Muñiz underwent surgery. In May 1999, the Premios Quijote were dedicated to him and Agrelot. Three months later, Muñiz published a cautionary article about the misuse of television programming, his posture on the impact that this had on newer generations and how the overall quality had declined. Afterwards, he opted to retire and spend time with his family and friends. Almost three decades after their conflict, Muñiz and Nigaglioni put their differences aside.

== Personal life ==
Muñíz was married to Luz María García de la Noceda and they had eight children: Rafael (aka Rafo), Ruby, Hilda, Mario, Luzie, Tomito, Manolo, Pedro and Félix Antonio (Toño). The birth of Rafael Emilio on 13 September 1956, served as comic relief for Muñiz, whose wife had been wanting a daughter for years. In their house, the couple also welcomed Ruby, the daughter of one of Muñiz cousins. Meanwhile, his children took several of their pets to create a small zoo from which they gained some income and entertainment and which is said to have been a precursor of sorts to the Monoloro park. Other activities to distract them included leading the local Girl Scouts. Muñiz himself acquired a house at Cayey, where he would relax and host parties. Rafo and Pedro are both well-known actors and producers and Toño currently is Production Manager for various promoters in Puerto Rico. In the 80s and 90s Toño was the producer of the yearly top Salsa event in the Caribbean, "Festival de Salsa Winston"; Pedro directed a dramatic film, Cayo. Manolo was a businessman before his untimely death in July 1995. Muñiz was an aficionado of baseball and swimming.

Tommy Muñíz died 15 January 2009 in Hato Rey, Puerto Rico. Luz María García de la Noceda died a day after her 87th birthday, on 21 October 2011. ommy Muñiz's life is described in two books: an autobiography named "Así he vivido" ("That's the way I've lived") and "¡Juan, Juan, Juan! Crónicas de la televisión en tiempos de don Tommy" by Puerto Rican author Beba García.

=== Other enterprises ===
At one time or another, Muñiz also owned a restaurant (La Campana) in Cayey), a pet shop in San Juan, a zoo (Monoloro) in Carolina, a thoroughbred stable, and a summer camp for children ("Camp Gualí"). He later delegated many of the administrative functions of his production company as to concentrate in scriptwriting and acting. Following the success of his shows, Muñiz incorporated Hernán Nigaglioni as the administrator of Producciones Tommy Muñiz. He joined Flavia García, who was serving as executive assistant. On 10 July 1968, Producciones Tommy Muñiz debuted the first local talk show, El Show de Tommy, with Muñiz as its host. García and López Neris completed the crew. Hosting a number of artists, politicians and civilians, the show traveled throughout the Puerto Rican archipelago, from which it was transmitted. The show was also responsible for filming the first surgeries to air in local television. A visit by the Guyanese prime minister was also hosted after the nation acquired its independence. Muñiz also became interested in developing several acres that he had inherited from his brother. By the summer of 1970, he had adapted a number of ideas and his ecological interests into a zoo known as El Monoloro. The facility housed lions, tigers, gazelles, zebras, kangaroos, an hippopotamus, an elephant, bears, a number of large reptiles and exotic birds acquired with the collaboration of the Guyanese authorities, but was headlined by the male chimpanzee named Yuyo. The ape, however, managed to escape his cage and was eventually captured and sent to the Parque de las Ciencias in Bayamón, where he lived until his death several decades later. In 1972, Muñiz shifted its focus to raising race horses, a venture that gave him a Clásico del Caribe winner in Guaybanex. The zoo was open for six years, with several of the animals eventually being transferred to the Mayagüez Zoo. Muñiz also acquired a beach house in Culebra. In June 1995, Muñiz and his sons inaugurated the theme park Camp Patricio.

== Legacy ==
There is a statue of Muñiz at the Parque a los Caballeros de la Television (Park of the TV Gentlemen) in Bayamon, Puerto Rico. Several homages were held in 2022 to commemorate the 100th Anniversary of Muñiz's birthday.

== Productions ==
Radio productions

- El Colegio de la Alegría (comedy)
- La Familia Pérez (comedy)
- Adelita, La Secretaria (comedy)
- Gloria y Miguel (comedy)
- ¡Qué sirvienta! (comedy)
- Las Aventuras de Andy Tenorio (comedy, based on the Archie comic strip)
- La Novela Fab (drama)

Television productions

- El Show de Shows (for which Muñiz produced the comedy section only – 1955)
- El Colegio de la Alegría (the radio comedy program, moved to television)
- A reírse con Fab (first of four different names for the time slot – comedy)
- El profesor Colgate (amateur talent contest)
- Carnaval Del Monte (variety show)
- La Taberna India (variety show, based on the American show Duffy's Tavern)
- Hogar, dulce hogar (sitcom)
- Lotus lo divierte (variety show – 1956)
- Garata Deportiva (sports commentary – 1956)
- El chiste Camel (comedy – 1957)
- Telefiesta de la Tarde (variety show – 1957)
- Reina por un día (prize show – 1959)
- Desafiando a los genios (comedy – various inceptions between 1959 and 2004. This was a personal favorite of Pablo Casals)
- El Show del Mediodía (varíety show)
- Encabuya y Vuelve y Tira (comedy / news / community service)
- La Criada Malcriada (sitcom)
- La Cámara Cómica (comedy / reality television, based on Candid Camera – various inceptions)
- Esto no tiene nombre (comedy, based on Rowan & Martin's Laugh-In – various inceptions)
- Ja, Ja, Ji, Ji, Jo, Jo con Agrelot (comedy / variety)
- Gloria y Miguel (sitcom)
- Viernes de Gala (variety)
- El especial de Corona (variety specials; first appearance by Otilio Warrington on television, 1967)
- Caras y caretas de las mujeres (comedy)
- El show de Tommy Muñiz (talk show)
- Hello, Puerto Rico (variety special)
- Las Almas No Tienen Color (novela – 1969)
- Historia de dos mujeres (novela – 1970)
- Cuando los hijos condenan (novela – 1970)
- Los Juanes (novela – 1971)
- Borinquen Canta (folk music / variety show, 1971)
- María del Mar (novela – 1971)
- El silencio nos condena (novela, 1972)
- Mami santa (novela, 1972)
- Claudia y Virginia (novela, 1973)
- Llanto para una mujer (novela, 1973)
- Marta (novela, 1973) Casting decisions caused the ASTRA strike against Muñiz's production company
- Los García (sitcom, 1976–1981)

== See also ==
- List of Puerto Ricans
