= Neil Raymond Ricco =

Spanish-Italian American poet

- Born: 1953 (age 72–73); North Bay Shore, New York, U.S.
- Education: Colby College; Long Island University
- Occupations: Poet; writer; author; supervisor; actor
- Writing career
- Pen name: Noel Rico; Neil Rico; Neil Ricco; Neil Raymond Rico
- Period: 1982–2021
- Notable awards: 1978 Creative Writing Fellowship from National Endowment for the Arts
- Literary movement: Nuyorican

Neil Raymond Ricco (born 1953), formerly known as Noel Rico, is a Spanish-Italian American poet and writer known for his works featured in publications by Nicolás Kanellos, Eileen Myles and Mike Marqusee. Ricco was an early member of the Nuyorican Poets Café and he appeared in the films A Life of Sin (1979) and Friend of the World (2020).

== Personal life ==
Ricco is from North Bay Shore, New York, growing up in the South Bronx until his family relocated to Brentwood, Long Island when he was 14. At the age of 23, he attended Long Island University and Colby College, earning a college degree. Ricco said he didn't embrace his American and Puerto Rican roots until he was living in Maine.

Ricco lived in Hialeah, Florida in the early 1980s. In 1997, he lived in Panama City, Panama as the spouse of a Foreign Service officer before relocating to San Diego, California in 2000. He lived in Chula Vista, California in 2003 but was homeless for several years before moving to downtown San Diego around 2012.

Ricco sanctioned for the city to have permanent housing for the homeless in 2010, rather than the transitional shelters provided until people recover financially. In 2022, Ricco was one of seventy two residents who were ordered to vacate after city inspectors reported health and safety violations at the C Street Inn.

== Career ==
As a young writer, he went by the name Noel Rico. Ricco's work has been published in languages of Spanish, Irish and Italian and he is influenced by Luis Lloréns Torres and Walt Whitman. In 1976, Ricco was part of the Nuyorican Poets Café community with Miguel Algarín and Luis Guzmán. Ricco later worked for the United States Foreign Service.

Ricco's works have been included in Puerto del Sol, Hawaii Pacific Review, Greenfield Review, Long Shot Magazine, Mag City, Contact/II, Y'Bird Reader, and Revista Chicano-Riqueña. Several of his works were published in Decade of Hispanic Literature: An Anniversary Anthology by Nicolás Kanellos and Hispanics in the United States: An Anthology of Creative Literature by Francisco Jiménez. He was awarded Creative Writing Fellowship from the National Endowment for the Arts in 1978. Ricco's poems "January In Motion" and "The Bronx 1979" are for Miguel Piñero.

In 1985, "Another Poem for Garcia Lorca" was published in Carreras. Casos en la comunidad. His poem "Excerpt from the South Bronx" appeared in Dodeca and Aloud: Voices from the Nuyorican Poets Cafe. "The First Place" was featured with "The Bronx, 1979" in New York, An Anthology by Mike Marqusee and with "The Lower East Side" and "Excerpt from the South Bronx II" in The Floating Borderlands.

After moving to San Diego, Ricco had to find other work when publishers like Simon & Schuster were declining deals for a book contract. While supervisor of Heritage Security Service at the Comerica Bank building on August 14, 2002, Ricco suffered a concussion after tripping upon exiting an elevator. The elevator had stopped a foot below the floor level and Ricco accused Otis Elevator Company for not maintaining the building's elevators. The situation created opposing tension between Heritage, Ricco and the building's contract.

Ricco's 2015 works Damsels in Distress, Bailey Among The Angels and The Rican Eye Detective Agency were edited and published by Michael C. Burgess.

== Filmography ==
Year	Title	Role	Notes
1976	The Nuyorican Poets	Himself	
1979	A Life of Sin		Also known as Isabel la Negra
2020	Friend of the World	Ignacio	

== Published works ==
=== As Noel Rico ===
1. "ROBERTO: A STORY POEM."
  - Bilingual Review / La Revista Bilingüe, vol. 4, no. 3, 1977, pp. 222–25.
  - Eileen Myles, et al. Mag City, no. 1, Jan. 1977, pp. 59–66. JSTOR 28040372
2. "NOTA AL PIE DE UNA PAGINA ACERCA DE LA CAIDA DE NUESTRA CULTURA."
  - Bilingual Review / La Revista Bilingüe, vol. 4, no. 3, 1977, pp. 221–221.
3. "ANOTHER POEM FOR GARCÍA LORCA."
  - Bilingual Review / La Revista Bilingüe, vol. 4, no. 3, 1977, pp. 220–21.
4. "POEM."
  - Bilingual Review / La Revista Bilingüe, vol. 4, no. 3, 1977, pp. 222–222.
5. "HOY EN EL PARQUE CENTRAL."
  - Bilingual Review / La Revista Bilingüe, vol. 4, no. 3, 1977, pp. 221–221.
6. "ON HEARING OF THE AILING JOHNNY WEISSMULLER."
  - Bilingual Review / La Revista Bilingüe, vol. 8, no. 2/3, 1981, pp. 185–86.
7. "THE PLAZA IN PONCE, 1979."
  - Bilingual Review / La Revista Bilingüe, vol. 8, no. 2/3, 1981, pp. 82–82.
8. "EXCERPT FROM THE SOUTH BRONX XX (The Assassination of John F. Kennedy)."
  - Bilingual Review / La Revista Bilingüe, vol. 8, no. 2/3, 1981, pp. 187–187.
9. "A HOT AUGUST NIGHT ON THE LOWER EAST SIDE."
  - Bilingual Review / La Revista Bilingüe, vol. 9, no. 2, 1982, pp. 168–69. JSTOR 25743997
10. "The Lower East Side: After Having Witnessed a Man Beating Up a Woman Underneath a Balcony Overlooking Avenue C"
  - Decade of Hispanic Literature: An Anniversary Anthology, University of Texas: Revista Chicano-Riqueña. 1982, pp. 98. ISBN 978-0-934770-18-7
11. "The Bronx, 1979"
  - Decade of Hispanic Literature: An Anniversary Anthology, University of Texas: Revista Chicano-Riqueña. 1982, pp. 99. ISBN 978-0-934770-18-7
12. "It Is Only the Flowers"
  - Decade of Hispanic Literature: An Anniversary Anthology, University of Texas: Revista Chicano-Riqueña. 1982, pp. 100. ISBN 978-0-934770-18-7
13. "Excerpt from the South Bronx I"
  - Decade of Hispanic Literature: An Anniversary Anthology, University of Texas: Revista Chicano-Riqueña. 1982, pp. 101. ISBN 978-0-934770-18-7
14. "Excerpt from the South Bronx II"
  - Decade of Hispanic Literature: An Anniversary Anthology, University of Texas: Revista Chicano-Riqueña. 1982, pp. 101. ISBN 978-0-934770-18-7
15. "The First Place"
  - Decade of Hispanic Literature: An Anniversary Anthology, University of Texas: Revista Chicano-Riqueña. 1982, pp. 102. ISBN 978-0-934770-18-7
16. "A Late Afternoon"
  - Decade of Hispanic Literature: An Anniversary Anthology, University of Texas: Revista Chicano-Riqueña. 1982, pp. 103. ISBN 978-0-934770-18-7

=== As Neil Raymond Ricco ===
1. "The Spanish Grandmother."
  - Bilingual Review / La Revista Bilingüe, vol. 27, no. 3, 2003, pp. 282–83. JSTOR 25745824
2. "La Coruña, Galicia."
  - Bilingual Review / La Revista Bilingüe, vol. 27, no. 3, 2003, pp. 284–85.
3. "Damsels in Distress" 2015. ASIN B018DBXEB4
4. "The Rican Eye Detective Agency" 2015. ASIN B019R5RYKC
5. "Bailey Among The Angels" 2015. ASIN B01A2NGDBE
6. "Not Tonight, My Love" 2019. ISBN 978-1-0904-2738-0
7. "A Killing in Hillcrest" 2020. ISBN 979-8-6443-2438-5
8. "King Virus: A Gangster's Tale" 2021. ASIN B098PH552T

== Other works ==
- Sandra María Esteves' poem "For Noel Rico" was published in Decade of Hispanic Literature: An Anniversary Anthology.
