= Video games in Puerto Rico =

A Pac-Man arcade cabinet in San Juan. The titular character was responsible for the first craze in Puerto Rico, where copies of the game were manufactured by Atari at its Fajardo-based factory for the console market.

The Caribbean archipelago of Puerto Rico has been involved with various aspects of the video game industry since the initial Golden age of arcade (1970s-80s). As a manufacturing hub, it has housed several cartridge and disc factories from the 1980s to the 2010s, starting with Atari during the second generation of the home console, Electronic Arts during the height of the first console war and more recently Microsoft. This responded to an economic model that predominated the public policy during the 20th Century following Operation Bootstrap, which involved an emphasis on manufacturing and industry with tax exemption benefits. Puerto Rico was also used as corporate distribution headquarters for the Caribbean and Central America by Atari and Sega.

From a consumption standpoint, video gaming is one of the predominant audiovisual forms of entertainment in modern Puerto Rico. The Atari and Coleco consoles were popular among the local youth during the 1970s-1980s. The arrival of the Nintendo Entertainment System (NES) had as much influence in Puerto Rico as everywhere else, with the island taking part in the resurgence of the industry following the crisis of the early 1980s. The industry is considered an emerging market by the government, with development and Esports being promoted by the local government and regulated by the Puerto Rico Gaming Commission and Puerto Rico Department of Sports and Recreation. Likewise, gaming conventions have developed a close relation with the tourism sector. Puerto Ricans have been involved with competitive gaming since the first Atari World Championships were held in 1981 and the founding of the first professional Esports league, the Cyberathlete Professional League (CPL), in 1997. With the creation of Extra Life Puerto Rico gamers became involved in charity, raising funds for the children non-profits such as Fundación de Niños de Puerto Rico.

== History ==
=== Arcade and early home consoles (1970-1990) ===
By the mid-1970s, there were arcades and independent sales of machines. Following an early introduction in 1972, Magnavox introduced the Odyssey 300 home console in 1976, with local media noting that its compatibility with televisions of all brands would make it "available for a large number of people". During this time, Meadows Games actively sought distributors for their arcade machines in the Puerto Rico market. Rematronix Research Development built a factory for coin operated arcade machines at Guánica. Sears began selling the Sears Tele-Games Video Arcade (its rebranded release of the Atari 2600), the Sears Tele-Games Pong and the Sears Electronic Baseball/Basketball/Auto Race handheld systems in Puerto Rico. Radio Shack did the same with the Tandyvision One, a licensed Mattel Intellivision, in 1982. The on-brand Atari 600 was also distributed locally. Concurrently, other retailers brought the Coleco Telstar Arcade (particularly the Coleco Telstar Alpha model) and Tomy Pocket Arcade to the market. Ventura Rodríguez & Sons marketed the Mattel brand in Puerto Rico, which also included the distribution of the Intellivision and other game consoles.

In March 1981, the Atari Corporation (through its subsidiary Atari Caribe Inc.) established a factory led by William Planas at Sector Industrial Puerto Real in Fajardo, where it manufactured its cartridges. Led by a mostly-female workforce of 300 employees, the plant produced more than 70,000 units per day with a low rate of defective products. The quality control was conducted in the venue, as one of several functions in which the employees rotated. Distribution of the locally produced cartridges was worldwide, with only 9% of them being sold in the United States. The corporation also began expanding the local distribution of their consoles. Sears introduced the Sears Tele-Games Video Arcade II (a rebranded Atari 2800), announcing that its version of the Atari 2600 had sold "an extraordinary amount" of units during the 1982 Holiday season, causing a shortage of consoles. This situation extended into the spring, with the console remaining sold out and only copies of Space Invaders remaining for the 2800 by March 1983 The consoles were also carried by local establishments.

By 1972, Atari Caribe had completed an expansion that added 71,000 square feet (6,600 m^{2}) to its factory, raising its workforce to 869 employees and 200,000 cartridges produced per day. The company also held its first Latin American distribution convention at San Juan. By this time, the region represented 10% of its total base with Puerto Rico as the main consumer. A single shipment of 49,546 cartridges was hijacked in a heist and appraised at 1.2 million dollars, with the perpetrators being caught and sentenced for disturbing inter-jurisdictional commerce. Of Atari's franchises, Pac-Man in particular gained widespread popularity, even being co-opted by the Popular Democratic Party (PPD) during the 1984 general elections under the pseudonym "La Come Coco", but also raising questions about video game addiction and public debates on the matter. The company led the industry in sales during the 1982 Puerto Rico Holiday season, holding about 75% of the cartridge sales for the time frame, in which overall video game sales were reported to have surpassed expectations. Franchises like Donkey Kong and Frogger gave third-party publishers and the Coleco mobility as well. CBS International introduced the Coleco Gemini in an exhibition of the brand's products held at San Juan.

At the touristic zone of Boquerón, the arcade El Spot was opened. El Tunel Car Wash also adapted its business to include video games for clients. The increase in video game arcades brought with it some challenges, including an increase in student absences being reported in public schools. Some citizens lobbied in favor of regulating, arguing that some of these businesses had been problematic to their communities since they were first established in the 1970s. However, they were supported by large commercial emporiums such as Plaza Carolina, which dedicated a section of its new design for an arcade when it expanded. So did Santa Rosa Mall when it opened its food court. New strip malls, the Western Bowling and Sports Center and the short-lived locale of the Tex Critter's Pizza Jamboree animatronics entertainment restaurant chain also incorporated video game into their business model.

During the summer of 1983, Coleco Industries launched a campaign hoping to capture 25% of the Puerto Rico market by the end of 1984. The company contracted fashion designer Annie Lago to create the uniform for the models charged with promoting the brand throughout Latin America. Atari Caribe opened a marketing office/distribution center at Canóvanas and oferred seminars during which the Atari 1200XL was featured. During this time, the company's latest consoles were selling well in Puerto Rico. In October 1983, Activision began making arrangements to establish a subsidiary named Activision Caribe at Ceiba. On its part, Radio Shack also marketed its handheld line, introducing the Tandy Cosmic 3000 Fire Away, Pocket Repeat, Alien Chase. and the Tandy 12, among others, and introduced its own PC gaming platform with the TRS-80 Color Computer and the Star Blaze game. The Columbia Home Arcade, an Atari 2600 console clone made by Columbia House and normally only sold by mail-order, was made available for purchase in Puerto Rico by Seedman's department store. The Tomytronic 3D also began being distributed through department stores.

During the mid-1980s, local corporation Pizza Management mixed its license of the Pizza Hut franchise with its Video Arcade business, which featured a room dedicated to video games in each establishment. When Las Cascadas water park was inaugurated at Aguadilla in March 1988, one of its attractions was a video arcade. However, the effects of the video game crash of 1983 were also experienced locally, with Atari Caribe laying off 360 employees at Fajardo (down from its peak of 900, the most for any single factory in the municipality). The company contracted the Merced, Benítez, Machín & Paulino (MBM) firm to handle its merchandising in the Caribbean. Though it initially denied that the Fajardo factory would close down, Atari Caribe eventually shuttered down its manufacturing operations. According to a MediaFax study published in April 1985, by this time 20% of the Puerto Rican households had home consoles by then. Video games also began impacting public policy at the municipal level, with a rezonification proposal tried to ban arcades from the Condado zone. Nintendo games were sold along ColecoVision consoles by specialized retailers like La Eléctronica since the mid-1980s. However, the brand reached a "fever pitch" among Puerto Rican consumers in 1988, following the release of the Nintendo Entertainment System (NES), with children requesting it at a rate that outpaced import and caused a shortage. Video games quickly entered the various aspects of pupular culture, being favored by young local celebrities such as Menudo members Robert Avellanet and Rubén Gómez, as well as actor Shalim Ortiz Goyco.

However, the return to the cultural forefront and the content of some video games gathered the attention of peace activists, such as the Proyecto Caribeño de Justicia y Paz, whose coordinator Edgardo Rivera raised concerns about the violence in some titles. Longtime University of Puerto Rico (UPR) president Jaime Benítez Rexach and figures from the Catholic Church also lobbied against them on these grounds. Another author raised concerns about young people loitering and "intimidating tourists" outside arcades (and other video game oriented businesses, like Chuckee Cheeses) at Condado. However, Ángel Ramos of Río Piedras who represented Puerto Rico at the 1983 Atari World Championships (finishing 5th in the Junior Division by scoring 298,676 points in the final) dismissed these concerns, stating that playing video games did not affect his personal life or studies. Dentists also considered video games a useful method to distract and reduce the stress of their patients while performing their procedures. Journalist Luis H. Echevarría commented that teachers also considered video games an additional hindrance for their work. The same author, however, published a column where he dismissed that "the Nintendo" was a leading cause for a drop in recreational reading and a decline in reading comprehension.

While Nintendo led the sales in the local market during the Holiday season, Sega also promoted the Master System, the Master System Base and the Sega Genesis in Puerto Rico during the peak of the first console war. The NES, however, was favored in the local media for having a bigger catalogue and range of games while offering a comparable quality. Video games be part of the marketing of several video club stores, which advertisement both Nintendo and SEGA products available. Pitusa, a department store chain, offered both game cassette and accessories such as the Power Glove. Kidoko,a children's clothing store, leveraged the console war by selling games from both brands. Foreign chains also used them in their local advertising, with Wendy's gifting more than 200 Nintendo Action Sets in a summer contest and Toy R' Us emphasizing the availability of the Action Set in its inaugural offer.

=== 1990s-2000s ===
Entering the 1990s, popular games and series included The Legend of Zelda, Mario, Sonic, Donkey Kong, Mortal Kombat, Kirby, Street Fighter, Dragon Warriors and StarTropics. This decade also brought the GameShark and Game Genie, which gained popularity among the Puerto Rican gamers to supersede password saving and cheat in games that were notoriously hard or otherwise did not feature a saving system. Nintendo Power, GamePro and other magazines were distributed, along BradyGames and Prima Games guides and other associated media that was supplemental to the video game industry. In 1992, Electronic Arts (EA) established its Caribbean subsidiary Electronic Arts Puerto Rico (EAPR) at Santa Isabel, where cartridge production reached numbers of 2.6 million (1993), 7.4 million (1994), 6.5 million (1995), and 4.1 million (1996). Later in the decade, games like GoldenEye 007, Mario Kart 64 and Super Smash Bros., among others, popularized offline multiplayer gaming. Since Puerto Rico is included in the North American market, instead of the Latin American market despite being predominantly Spanish-speaking, gamers began learning English by contact and interaction through video games. As the console wars continued throughout the decade, Sega imported its products to Puerto Rico via VideoCamp Electronics, it also established a corporate headquarters office from where they were distributed to the rest of the Caribbean and Central America. This branch continued active until 2002, when Sega began downsizing following consecutive years of net losses and had admitted that it emerged from the first console wars as a losing party, ultimately stopping the production of its line.

The Sega Genesis had wide retail support local stores and along Nintendo (holding a wide lead in handheld preferences with the Game Boy, Game Boy Pocket and Game Boy Color) and newcomer Sony (with the PlayStation and franchises like the Final Fantasy, Resident Evil, Metal Gear Solid, Tekken, Grand Turismo, Tomb Raider, Spyro and Crash Bandicoot series), dominated the Puerto Rican video gaming market during the 1990s. PC gaming lagged behind the consoles, in part due to still nascent internet infrastructure and additional costs in comparison to the consoles. As with other places throughout the globe, a Pokémon "craze" took hold of the young Puerto Rican public (with it, link cable-based multiplayer gaming peaked in practice) during the late 1990s, to the extent that a member of the Puerto Rico House of Representatives requested formal legislative investigation on how the matter was affecting the local youth. The satanic panic narrative surrounding the brand abroad reached the local media and societal debate as well. At the turn of the century, video games gathered the attention of the Legislature of Puerto Rico, which approved Ley Núm. 87, introducing amendments to the foundational law of the DACO and expanding its oversight to oversee the classification of electronic media based on content (mainly violence) through the Junta Asesora del Departamento de Asuntos del Consumidor sobre Sistemas de Clasificación de Programas de Televisión, Juegos de Video y Juguetes Peligrosos. The implementation forced retailers to exhibit a sing in Spanish explaining the rating that was granted by this board, a tiered system comprised by three classes, green (appropriate for all ages), yellow (moderate level of violence or fantasy violence) and red (high or realistic violence).

By this decade, the amount of gamers in Puerto Rico was estimated at 793,000. This group was led by a large quantity of adults and young adults, which in addition to consuming the series that had been popular since the 1980s-1990s also fueled an increase in popularity for other games targeted at older demographics such as Grand Theft Auto III, Grand Theft Auto: Vice City, Grand Theft Auto: San Andreas, Halo, Halo 2, as well as the Call of Duty, God of War, Gears of War and Devil May Cry series, among others. This included the fighting genre which expanded upon previous efforts that had organized tournaments that included Street Fighter and other franchises. Microsoft opened operations at Humacao in 1989, manufacturing Xbox 360 discs for games like Halo 3, Halo: Reach, Fable II and Minecraft during the late 2000s and 2010s.

Video games dominated the sales for the 2006 Holiday season, representing about 70% of the purchases in the toys and entertainment category. In November 2007, Frankie López (better known by his gamer tag/artistic pseudonym "Hambo") founded the Puerto Rico Association of Gamers (PRAG), the first organized collective with an island-wide scope and began organizing tournaments such as Phase 3. The organization deflected criticism directed towards the industry when it came to children being exposed to violent content by emphasizing parental supervision and noted that the then-recent introduction of the Nintendo Wii system to the local market was promoting active life styles, in contrast to the perception that the medium promoted sedentary behavior (which, at the time, was the main concern lobbied against video games in Puerto Rico). In April 2008, Puerto Rico was reported to have led all 3,800 GameStop and EB Games districts in preorders and sales of Grand Theft Auto IV within the first days of release, with the enthusiasm being noted in midnight release events organized by the PRAG. The island also out-bought all the other districts during the first 48 hours following the release into market. The game itself was based on a fictionalized version of New York City and reflected real demographics, as such it featured several Puerto Rican characters, a mission, music and iconography, as well as invited celebrity Daddy Yankee as an in-universe DJ for the radio station San Juan Sounds. This was common for the Grand Theft Auto franchise, which had included minor references to Puerto Rico in Vice City (the cuisine business Cafe Under the Tree) and San Andreas (a license plate).

Outside of this franchise, Puerto Rican representation remained rare with playable characters mostly reflecting avatars of real athletes in sports games, which reflected a larger industry trend of underrepresentation among all Latino groups. However, continuing a trend first seen in 1995's Sea Legends, the archipelago as a setting was prominent in adventure games about the Golden Age of Piracy and the pop culture trope of piracy in the Caribbean during the 2000s, specifically Old San Juan and its colonial-era fortifications Castillo San Felipe del Morro and Castillo San Cristóbal, including the Port Royale series, Sid Meier's Pirates!, with some appearances outside of this setting such as a PC adaptation of the eponymous board game, Microsoft's Flight Simulator series and the AND1 video games Street Hoops and AND 1 Streetball. The decade closed with the first editions of the Gaming Xplosion Fest, with multiple competitions being held in shooters, sports and fighting games.

=== The social media age (2010-2020) ===
With the popularization of social media, a number of groups such as YetAnotherPlatinum, Fighting Gaming Community, MiGameroom, Fan Boy, Chikas Gamers and Gamers Gang, Cyber Box, PS PR Gamers, Los duros de Call of Duty, Team Ragnarok, PC Gamers Puerto Rico, XBox Live Puerto Rico, Gamers Crew, Puerto Rico Online Gamers, IGDA, PR Gamers and the Puerto Rico Association of Gamers emerged. These usually operated independently, but on occasion they coordinated activities. On October 27, 2013, several joined for the first time in the charity event Challenge Accepted. A number of these were born due to lack of recreation initiatives in their respective communities or as a hobby. Several of them had media presence (predominantly in radio), such as Berti of Fan Boy, Heriberto of Mi Game Room, Hambo and Giga of Yo Soy un Gamer (both radio and television) and several groups that compose Info-Gamers (this one with presence in the mainstream newspaper, Metro Puerto Rico). By 2012, video games were noted as a popular way for parents to entertain children and "the favorite baby sitter of Puerto Rican parents", which once again brought back the public debate about their content. Figures like University of Puerto Rico (UPR) anthropologist Jorge Duany argued against their effects in the upbringing.

Puerto Rico was included in Florida's district for GameStop sales and by 2011 represented 65% of its total annual sales. The island was noted as "purchasing games like there was no tomorrow". At launch events, some cultural elements such as local urban music were integrated as entertainment along games to diversify the experience of the attendees. Other aspects of gaming culture seen abroad, such as cosplaying as characters, have also been introduced locally. In 2012, estimates placed the existing amount of video game consoles as more than 500,000 island wide. On May 22, 2014, WAPA-TV debuted Yo Soy Un Gamer with Francisco López and Iván Colón as hosts, which became the first show exclusively dedicated to the Puerto Rican gaming community in television. Prior to this development, Yo Soy Un Gamer had begun as a video game and entertainment platform in 2011. During the late 2010s, the show aired on WLII-DT. In January 2016, GameStop decided to close down all 40 of its stores in the archipelago, which employed about 400. A number of local businesses filled the niche, distributing video games and consoles along other forms of entertainment and anime, comic and geek culture. The release of Pokémon GO created a second wave of popularity for the franchise, with events being held in places like Castillo San Felipe del Morro. In November 2016, Nintendo also sold out all of the NES Classic Edition consoles imported into the Puerto Rican market within an hour.

In June 2019, the Consejo Asesor en Asuntos de Videojuegos, Ligas de Juegos Electrónicos y Apuestas Deportivas was created via Executive Order and included under its scope was video game development and Esports, with the government considering the industry a potential venue of income and supporting its development through the Puerto Rico Commerce and Export Company (CCE). By the late 2010s and early 2020s, the government considered video games one of the areas with most potential for development an export, along phone Apps, having the human and technological resources already available. During this time, athletes continued present as characters in video games, including Javier Báez who was featured in the cover of MLB The Show 20. The popular culture impact of multi-hyphenate artist Bad Bunny also found its way into the industry, with playable appearances in the WWE 2K and NBA 2K series. The latter of these marked the first time that a Puerto Rican professional sports team was featured in a AAA game, when the Cangrejeros de Santurce and their home court appeared in NBA 2K24. Entering the 2020s, the video game industry continued growing in Puerto Rico, as First Attack entered its tenth year and expanded internationally.

As with other jurisdictions, gaming significantly increased in Puerto Rico during the quarantine imposed due to the COVID-19 pandemic. During this time, Playerz del Género was launched at YouTube, featuring several urban artists playing video games. Forced to suspend the regular tournament and reorganize in bubble format, the Baloncesto Superior Nacional (BSN) teamed with Red Rooster Team to create the From The Sofa Cup, where José Rodríguez defeated other players in NBA 2K. The 2021 First Attack emphasized the Retro Festival, holding formal Esports tournaments for Galaga, Ms. Pac-Man and Donkey Kong. The COVID-19 pandemic forced the Puerto Rico Gaming League and the Puerto Rico Comic Con to rethink their approach, leading to the group debuting an international Call of Duty Modern Warfare tournament named No Man's Land, with the participation teams from Paraguay, Ecuador and Mexico along locals Red Rooster and Artritis. Other elements of geek culture continued to seep into the gaming community, such as gameplay streaming by VTuber Ironmouse. Institutions like the San Juan based Holberton Coding School specialized in coding and game development. A sharp increase in gaming among local minors was noted during the pandemic, leading to the UPR's psychiatric department urging parents to supervise their children. A Spanish-dubbed version of the Súper Mario Bros. Live Show was staged at Centro de Bellas Artes (CBA) in 2024. In June 2026, the first edition of the GAMERGY convention was organized at San Juan with Esports as the main topic, along digital culture and niche TCGs.

The industry continued having exposure in traditional television media, with Yo Soy Un Gamer continuing to air during this decade, but moving to WKAQ-TV. In August 2026, WAPA-TV debuted another gaming show La Guarida del Tiburón, hosted by professional gamer Yafed Marrero (known by his gamer tag "Tiburón"). Distinct Puerto Rican characters were introduced with more frequency but remained rare, with figures such as Resident Evil: Operation Raccoon City's Hector "Beltway" Hivers and Marvel's Spider-Man's Miles Morales being the exception to this rule. The island and its history remained tied to the piracy setting, being included in the cancelled Pirates of the Caribbean game Armada of the Dammed and with historical privateer Miguel Enríquez being used as part of a campaign to promote Assassin’s Creed IV: Black Flag throughout Ibero America.

== Esports ==
=== First tournaments ===
In 1997, Puerto Rican Angel Muñoz founded the Cyberathlete Professional League (CPL), the first formal professional Esports league in the world, with Quake initially serving as the main competition game, and continued sanctioning international tournaments into the 2000s. During this time, the Colón Román family launched the Expert Net ISP at Arecibo which also included a server exclusively dedicated to Quake 2. A Counter-Strike team and Anthony González (using the game tag DooMeR_pr) competed StarCraft: Brood War at the 2003 World Cyber Games held at Seoul, South Korea. David Vicens (known by the gamer tag Kash) becoming national champion in Tekken 5 and successfully lobbying to have Puerto Rico included as an official region sanctioned by Namco. The corporation had actively remained in the island since the height of the arcade era, with several locales of the Time-Out brand operating in close proximity to Caribbean Cinemas theaters.

Ricardo Róman Ithier, who has been hosting bi-annual tournaments since 2005, noted that during its first decade the industry has not grown to the point where it was possible to make a livelihood of it. To counter this, competitive players were sent abroad from 2007 to 2011, before the initiative was inverted to instead bring foreign players to Puerto Rico. Sponsors have gained more involvement as the practice grew in popularity and sophistication. The increase of local player rankings and other hierarchy adapts gaming to a sports friendly facade, allowing for a better transition to the mainstream. Due to this, competition gained traction in Puerto Rico, with dedicated gamers often considering themselves Esports athletes. The focus of this group lies in competitive tournaments and events where international players are guests, instead of exhibitions or conventions. Tournaments of competitive gaming have been organized by a number of organizations such as the Fighting Game Community PR, Gamers Gang PR and PR Gamer.

The first were held early and by the mid-2000s, there were people specializing in hosting these events. These include Bar Fights, and First Attack, while others like Challenge Accepted and He'll-O-Ween Tournament mixed other complementary fandoms. Some, such as Mark Nieves of PR Gamer, have made distinctions between gamers and other groups (such as cosplayers and -whatever the fuck Yu-Gi-Oh is-) and noted that activities must be organized noting the age-group that the presence of other fandom attracts to ensure success. While distancing is evident between different fandoms, it remains unclear how these converge with each other as a whole. In the metropolitan region, fighting games such as those of the Marvel vs. Capcom, Super Smash Bros. and Street Fighter series were more popular, but first person shooters are more popular in competitions held in the Central Region. The cost of entry for these tournaments can vary from a few dollars in the independent ones to $25-40 in the more sophisticated events. Exhibitions such as Best Battles Fighting Games Exhibition are also organized to promote individual tournaments.

=== Professionalization ===
During this time, Esports grew in the local market, fueled by the First Attack events organized by Román (going by the gamer tag "Mono"). In 2014, Román and Maricarmen Vargas, the first female Esports professional and top-ranked Latin American player in League of Legends, founded the Electronic Sports Puerto Rico (EsportsPR) league. They worked with people from abroad to expand. The Smash en Puerto Rico team competed in Super Smash Bros. at EVO 2014. Team Ragnarok, a community that specialized in fighting games, was also active during this time. Smash in Puerto Rico organized a team that competed at APEX 2015 in the Super Smash Bros. Melee, Super Smash Bros. Smash 4, Ultimate Marvel vs. Capcom 3 and Super Street Fighter IV categories. That year Eduardo Pérez (known by his gamer tag PR Balrog) finished 5th in Street Fighter IV at the Capcom Cup.

The 2015 First Attack: Puerto Rico Gaming Weekend marked Capcom's first exhibition of Street Fighter V in the Americas. In September 2015, Space Rhino sponsored the Puerto Rico Game Jam at Bayamón, an event for game developers. The third edition of Gaming Island convention focused on a Mario Kart 8 competition. Prior to EVO 2019, Red Rooster Team promoted itself as "the Puerto Rico national Esports team" and entered the tournament in the fighting categories. In 2022, TRR competed at the Latin American Elements League, gathering wins over Bandits (Dominican Republic), Goat Esports (Costa Rica) and broke the undefeated 14–0 streak of incumbent champion Saprissa Esports (Costa Rica, a subsidiary of football team Deportivo Saprissa), finishing 3rd in the Opening stage and 4th in the Closing stage. Locally, First Attack received support from the government's Office of Innovation and Information. By 2021, it was considered the largest Esports event in the Caribbean and gained the attention of media producer Luisito Vigoreaux. In December 2022, Román classified to participate in the global Street Fighter V Capcom Pro Tour 2023.

The Arcadia Battle Royale was held for the first time in eight years in 2024, offering up to $30,000 in prizes. The lineup for First Attack 2024 included Street Fighter 6, Guilty Gear Strive, Super Smash Bros. Ultimate and Tekken 8. The B You Prospects Academy at Caguas established a program to train e-athletes. In June 2023, the Esports Coaching Academy was created in association with the Esports Coaching Academy (ECA). Román won the Street Fighter 5 category at the 2023 DreamHack San Diego tournament, competing for Red Rooster Team he defeated ranked players GilbsSkills, WeebTresh, Jazdero, Stupendous, Dreaddragon and Cory Bell. The Winter Clash received the support of the Puerto Rico Tourism Company and continued as an annual fixture, with competition in Pac-Man, fighting, shooting and other retro arcade games. In response to the creation of the Olympic Esports Series, Red Rooster Team organized the Gaming Island event focusing on educating the public at large about multiple aspects of the industry. During this time, the team also offered a virtual course on Esports in conjunction with the WIN platform. Román was Puerto Rico's representative during the debut of video games at the 2026 Central American and Caribbean Games.

== Game development ==
During the 1990s, the Puerto Rico Assistive Technology Project worked on developing Spanish-based versions of alternate computer input devices are considered, among which were low-cost assistive devices. Among these, programs to allow the visually impaired and people with motor disabilities to play video games were created with an emphasis on the Hispanic market. The PR Games Developers Cooperative was also created. During the 2000s, José Raúl Rodríguez created the development studio Por Diversión, which began developing Puerto Rico-themed and educational video games targeted towards the local market, gaining an international hit with the release of the card-based Briscas. In 2001, Lesser de Marchena and Michael Irizarry founded Data Juegos, an online gaming community that also focused on Quake (mainly the third entry of the franchise) and Unreal Tournament. Like the efforts from the previous decade, this one emerged at Arecibo and was born from a previous LAN Party. Abroad, Puerto Rican programmers became involved with the game development side of the industry, such as Ron Amador and Ben Quintero who worked with EA subsidiary Electronic Arts Tiburon (now EA Orlando) at Maitland, Florida.

During the 2010s, phone games were developed locally, with figures like independent coder Javier Camacho (Boli: A Game With Balls, Qubis and Shooting Dots), Yamil Rivera (Aplasta la cucaracha, One Black Dot and Vuela Tika Vuela) and Carlos Chaparro (Destroy Them) releasing games on the Android and Apple app stores. Other studios that emerged during this time include Gladius LLC (Ese Pobre Lechón) and DogFire Games. In 2011, the Kodu Cup was brought to Puerto Rico recruiting children to develop games. The streamlining of development tools also expanded the tools available for possible developers, but licensing costs were still a concern preventing some of the smaller studios from entering into the closed Nintendo, Microsoft and Sony store environments. Various colleges, including Atlantic University offer game development degrees during the 2010s. The government approved incentives for game development, while Puerto Rico debuted in the Global Game Jam. Space Rhino Games, was funded at San Juan and then a novel studio, benefited from these for the release of the tower defense/MOBA/RTS hybrid game Breach TD.

The Puerto Rico Science, Technology and Research Trust specifically identified the industry as a venue for education tools, as well as commercial activity. The Commission, however, began exploring the possibility of getting involved in the multi-billion dollar global Esports market by enabling sports betting for electronic competition. In 2018, the CCE opened the PR Emprende Challenge for game developers. As the game developers organized into the Puerto Rico Game Developers Association (PRGDA), the Puerto Rico Games Showcase was created at the turn of the decade to give exposure to their work. In August 2020, the first Puerto Rico Game Showcase featured the work of ten local game studios. The event continued on a yearly basis from that point onwards. In November 2020, SRG Studios' INK Inc. was the top selling app for Android/iOS and was downloaded 96 million times in its first month. In June 2021, Universidad del Sagrado Corazón teamed with Epic Games, gaining access to the license of Unreal Engine for its 3D animation program. In December 2023, 8 Bit Bosses Studio published Reef Escape on the Nintendo Switch store. In March 2023, the Puerto Rico Eductation Department introduced the Microsoft Minecraft Education Challenge to its high school curriculum, intending to use video games as a learning tool.

== Events and conventions ==
The Gaming Xplosion Fest introduced the concept of video games conventions where exhibitions and tournaments were hosted in the same, large venue, sponsored by a number of companies. The event continued growing in the early 2010s, reaching five editions and incorporating early access to games like Call of Duty: Black Ops II and PlayStation All-Stars Battle Royale, as well as early looks at consoles like the Wii U. In 2013, the GXF became Arcadia, which held an additional event the following year and eventually evolved into a spinoff battle royale event. It preserved the same format, including multi-day passes and is attended by a more diverse population (dominated by family units) with its 2013 edition exceeding 5,000 visitors. The event also holds tournaments for fighting games and FPSs as usual, but includes sports games. In 2018, First Attack became an official stop in the Capcom Pro Tour. The Arcadia Battle Royale continued being organized on an annual basis, continuing its emphasis on Esports and tech demonstrations. The Claro Gaming Championship, a Call of Duty multi-division tournament, has been held annually throughout the 2020s. In August 2026, international convention Gamergy held its first edition in Puerto Rico. Beginning in the mid-2020s, the Caribbean GamiC Expo was organized at the Western coast in municipalities like Moca and San Sebastián, that are ordinarily outside the Metropolitan area of influence.

== Academic study ==
Few relevant studies have been carried on the Puerto Rican players. Due to this, it is not well known how the local gaming culture is structured in relation to the main population, how individuals identify with the concept being a gamer, what preferences they have and how video games impact their lives. Psychologist Alexis Rodríguez Ramos' thesis was published in a book titled Game On Puerto Rico in 2015. By the mid-2010s, video gaming history had become a topic of both formal study and conferences within the Puerto Rican academic community. With the intent of identifying what may constitute a gaming subculture in Puerto Rico (be they specific characteristics or preferences) Rodríguez depended on the classification of social interaction and hierarchy, fields and habits formulated by sociologist Pierre Bordieu (2005). With video games as a social (campo), the respective habits were studied. Gamers were directly queried about several studies that present hypotheses connecting video game violence to real violence, in an attempt to include the perspective of the subjects in a field of study that rarely considers it and what constitutes the subjective experience besides content.

The concept of "rage quit" was analyzed, with the author establishing its presence as a fleeting canalization of frustration based on the interruption of a goal as stated in Berkowitz's model (2006) and more dependent on individual personality, grade of immersion, the reasons for failure and the circumstances of the game rather than violence in its content. By the mid-2010s, computer technician Lucrecio Ramos began exhibiting his private collection of retro consoles and lobbying for the creation of a formal museum. Between 2017 and 2024, an investigation team led by Yamil O. Ortiz Ortiz carried out a study on the effects of video games over the mood and mental state of students for the Social Sciences Faculty of the University of Puerto Rico, finding that both active and passive games lowered stress levels on the studied population. The role of video games on the cognitive development of children's was one of the main topics of the Instituto de la Neurociencia Cognitiva's NeuroEDU 2025 congress. In March 2026, the Congreso Puertorriqueño de Investigación y Estudios sobre Videojuegos was held at the Social Sciences Faculty of the University of Puerto Rico at Río Piedras.

=== Demographics ===
Until the concept of a "gamer" became popularized, social perception lead to the association of the practice to the nerd and geek subcultures and the idea that players were assumed to be interested in it as an addiction. Despite advances, stereotypes still depict gamers as more infantile than the general population. The average age of gamers in Puerto Rico was found to be 33 in an academic study, with several age groups involved in gaming. Men represent a majority of the gaming population (73.5% of Rodríguez's poll), presumably for a number of sociocultural factors and the content of games. Even among those that play, a majority of women (30%) average 4 hours or less of weekly gaming and prefer passive expositions/launches over a minority (16.3%) that attends competitive events. The gaming subculture in Puerto Rico is not only defined by common interests and socialization, but also includes a level of knowledge about the industry and its figures. Rodríguez focused on the specific practices and profile (gender, investment, preferences, etc.) exhibited the local gamers, if they identify as members of a subculture and how gaming impacts their socialization and general role within society. Onsite ethnographic observational studies (held at events specific to gamers such as midnight launches and tournaments) were combined with online polling and pattern-identification interviews. Specific polling was also employed to gauge areas of interest.

Rodríguez described the intent of the ethnographic studies as centered on the examination of "sociocultural context within the interaction of gamers". Economical and environmental factors were also analyzed. Ethical group observations at midnight launches established that these were well attended reaching 50-100+ participants composed by a population generally aged 18-25 (with some outliers) and mostly male, with limited interactions based on strategies or game specifics, and attendees dispersing quickly once the games are handed. A number of gimmicks are employed to entertain buyers by the individual stores, generally based on trivia contests and the occasional cosplay competition. Most of the interactions linked to these events take place around the feedback of the players, usually on diverse online platforms, which in turn have served to create a number of gamer communities. Individual observations at tournaments and exhibitions established that some players are willing to invest in better equipment regardless of cost. Assistants to tournaments were mostly males aged in their late teens and mid-twenties, who also represented the bulk of the actual competitors. Interactions were also noted to be more amicable and sociable than midnight launches, aiding in the formation of social groups that he labelled as "contemporary tribes". Exhibitions attracted an older audience (25-35), but remained predominantly male and overlapped with the other groups. Assistants were noted to bring their own controllers.

The poll phase was constructed to include both qualitative and quantitative questions and focused on local adult gamers as a target group. The protocol of the online segment was created after analyzing the format of several preceding polls, being divided by demographics, practices and preferences. Social media was used to recruit subjects from the desired age group. With 505 valid votes, the results noted a predominantly male public (73.5%) averaging 33 years of age, with most (34.9 + 29.3 + 6.7 + 2.1) possessing at least high school education, a medium income of 10, 000 to 20,000 and of various civic states.

Among the then-current generation the gamers of Puerto Rico preferred the Playstation 3/ PSP/PSP Vita (28.3%) followed by gaming computers (16.4%), with the Microsoft Xbox 360/Xbox ONE (10.9%) and Nintendo's Wii/Wii U/3DS (6.6%) lagging behind. Nintendo was the only company were handhelds were more popular than home consoles, with smartphones are having large presence (67.5%) in the handheld department. Action Adventure Games were the most popular with 13.4%, followed by FPS with 11% and RTS with 10% with most of the other genres evenly divided and the least popular type being rhythm games at 5%. Shooter games were predominantly popular among males while rhythm games were more popular with females. Most participants (21%) placed their weekly average between 5-10 hours of gaming with a preference for weekends for females and weeknights for males. A majority of Puerto Rican gamers began playing aged 6-10 (45%) followed by those that did before or during the age of 5 (32%), with a decline in game time as they aged. Multiplayer games are mostly played online (50.1%) with a preference to play with friends online (29.9%), however, women prefer to play accompanied. Assistance to midnight launches, tournaments and exhibitions represent a 28.9%, 20.6% and 17.6% of the other video game-related activities within this population.

Most players (40.8%) self-identify as regular gamers instead of expert gamers (32.3%), with males preferring the latter term more frequently than females. In terms of comparisons to other demographic studies, the gender distribution is more reminiscent to Croatia than the United States or Spain and in average older than the second and the United Kingdom. A majority (55%) is single, as opposed to the statistics of Spain where 52% reports a formal relationship. Semi-structured interviews were held with five male and one female adult gamers, most recruited at events and one by recommendation. The topic revolved around the impact of video games in their daily life and personal/societal perception, with preset questions that were thematically analyzed. While there was a consensus that the public perception has recently improved with the emergence of the "gamer" concept, one of the interviewees felt that there is still segregation. Some dependence was observed, with gaming representing the medium preferred to socialize or relax, most felt comfortable in belonging to a particular niche along similar minded people.

The interviewees named the development of motor, problem solving and foreign language skills, among others, as benefits of the practice. Despite denying the existence of an objective link between violent games and actual violence, they did caution against exposing young children to such content. The interviewed classified gaming as a hobby. In his analysis, Rodríguez notes that the disassociation provided by games is similar to that of other socialization practices such as sports or parties, allowing a venue of interaction for group of people with similar identities. Individually, they may improve particular skills and lead to the improvement of discipline and self-esteem. However, social isolation and misplacement of priorities is also a possibility when moderation was abandoned. Rodríguez notes how the actual perception of gamers contradicts studies that claim a link between violence and gaming, and emphasizes the existence of other factors that might influence such behavior.

Rodríguez concludes that the majority of Puerto Rican gamers are aged 19-21, either educated or active students, who find in gaming a venue to socialize with the likeminded and relief stress. The stereotype of a "loner" gamer is not predominant in local subculture, as most practice gaming as a form to interact with friends or strangers within this particular subculture (or "tribe", as he names it). Gaming is classified as a distinct habitus within the field that are video games as a whole, witnessed by particular behaviors related to gear and strategy. Due to time and recruitment constraints, inter-fanon interactions and gender variables remained open to study beyond the available observations.

== Perception and mainstream culture ==
Video games were incorporated into several other industries during the latter part of the 20th Century. When the industry film The Wizard (1989) was released in Puerto Rico, a cinema promotion offered 100 free tickets to children under 16. Plaza Acuática, which was the largest water park in the Caribbean between 1989-2001, included an arcade named El Arca del Tesoro with Sega, Namco, Mr. Micro, Tengen and Atari machines. When an amusement park was created around the Camuy cavern system, it also included an arcade. The Puerto Rico Tourism Company auctioned a space for arcade machines at the Balneario de Luquillo. The Dorado Community Library habilitated a wing for video gaming.

Despite becoming a common practice for a large portion of the Puerto Rican population, there was still apprehension towards gaming being exhibited by local psychologists and political entities, mostly linked to the perception that video games promote violence. Due to this, community-based activities have been organized independently. Rodríguez (2012) La criminalización del entretenimiento violento: los videojuegos como espacio de transgresión de lo cotidiano. Registros Criminológicos Contemporáneos. Various non-profits have emerged to combat this perception, the Extra Life Foundation organized a Just Dance at the 2016 Puerto Rico Comic Con to benefit the San Jorge Children's Hospital. Following the impact of hurricane Maria on various aspects of the local infrastructure, SRG Studios released puzzle game Relief Road: Puerto Rico to raise funds for reconstruction. Despite this and the support of the government, functionaries from some agencies such as former Police Superintendent Antonio López Figueroa still labeled them publicly as a source of violence and crime. The government ultimately launched the Smart Island public safety campaign through Oficina de Innovación y Servicios de Tecnología (PRITS), targeted at parents of children accessing online video games which involved interactions with others.

Video games have a notable influence on the lexicon of young Puerto Ricans, which was noted in academic research on the matter that identified "Mario Bros." (28th), "Candy Crush" (35th) and "Game Boy" (30th) among the most common unique vocables among public school students in 2018. This was an increase from 1999, when only "Atari" was regarded as ubiquitous among the community at large. By the 2020s, gaming culture was integrated to the fashion scene of Puerto Rico by designer Melissa Morales and Damarojo Studios. By the 1980s, the phrase "Nintendo Político" was used as an euphemism for political dishonesty by a young Kenneth McClintock. The term was used by other authors during this time, as a synonym for political demagogue.

The arts at large have also been influenced by the industry, with the Puerto Rico Museum of Contemporary Art hosting the first edition of the Primer Festival de Videojuegos de Puerto Rico in July 2013. In November 2022, Empresas Caparra announced that a video game theme restaurant named Our House would open in San Patricio Plaza at Guaynabo. In February 2017, the Puerto Rico Symphony Orchestra presented the Video Game Live, a concert with a video game repertoire. In May 2023, the Orquesta Camerata Pops organized its Video Games Concert at the University of Puerto Rico. In November 2025, the Mayagüez Resort & Casino inaugurated the eSpot Gaming Lab, which was reportedly the first video game parlor in a western coast hotel. As Caribbean Cinemas remodeled its locales during the 2020s, the arcade game room continued to be part of its business model, but it was now run by the theater itself.
