= Eddie López =

Puerto Rican journalist

- Born: 1940; Fajardo, Puerto Rico
- Died: November 26, 1971 (aged 30–31); San Juan, Puerto Rico

Manuel Eduardo López Rolón a.k.a. Eddie López (1940–1971) was a Puerto Rican journalist.

== Early life and career ==
Eddie López was born in Fajardo, Puerto Rico in 1940, the son of Manuel López Canals (former employee of the Department of Agriculture/Forest Service) and Teresa Rolón Perez (home maker). He had a younger sister, María Esperanza Teresa López Rolón, who was born in 1953. Lopez lived in Fajardo, Mayagüez, Toa Alta, Bayamón, and Guaynabo where he finally settled with his wife Margarita Alicea and three sons; Jorge Luis, Carlos, and Victor Antonio, until his death. He attended Santa Rosa High School in Bayamón, and did two years at Notre Dame University in Indiana.

His first job after leaving college was at El Mundo newspaper in 1959, where he worked for two years prior to joining The San Juan Star in July 1961. He worked as a reporter until 1963 when he was named assistant city editor.

In 1966 he advanced to city affairs editor, a position he held for one year. Following this, Lopez decided to become a full-time columnist and independently write in-depth stories various issues that interested him.

== Media career ==
López achieved success as both a comedy and news writer, considered a rare accomplishment in his time. He was a script writer for Tommy Muñiz productions as well as a frequent guest on Muñiz's Esto no tiene nombre, a Puerto Rican comedy television program strongly based on the American television program, Rowan and Martin's Laugh-In. López's first script was inspired by Orson Welles' radio broadcast adaptation of H.G. Wells' The War of the Worlds, describing a fictional uprising of Puerto Rico's outlying islands, Culebra, Monito, and Mona (whose names in Spanish are also animal names), under the leadership of a mock veterinarian, played by López himself. The script was reportedly so convincing that the station's general manager, Norman Louveau, was awakened later that night by law enforcement officials who had received many telephone calls from concerned citizens asking whether the uprising was real. Muñiz was forced to clarify the matter following morning on another television program of his.

López was also a panelist of the political debate TV show Ante la prensa, as well as the moderator for Cara a cara ante el pais, whose format is still mimicked by political debate shows in Puerto Rico, almost four decades after the show's first airing.

Fluent in English and Spanish, Lopez was well and diversely read, and he frequently did translation work.

As a newspaper columnist, he was known for his humorous "Candid Flowers" series of letters, (a plausible literal translation of his main character's name "Candido Flores"). These Spanish stories relied heavily on local slang, which he then would translate literally and word for word into English. The result would be a short story that would only be decipherable by someone who was fluent in both languages, which created a unique Puerto Rican brand of humor.

Eddie's love for the arts and his vast knowledge of classical music made him a well known critic of the genre.

His diagnosis with cancer and subsequent radiotherapy treatment, inspired an idea for a political parody, in which he could lampoon current political wrongdoings and blame it all on his gamma ray treatments. López recruited actor Jacobo Morales, who expanded on the idea, suggesting taking Eddie's newspaper parodies and blending them with previously censored TV scripts to produce a political parody stage show. Morales shared comedy duties with Horacio Olivo on Esto no tiene nombre, and was a reciting poet on Producciones Tommy Muñiz jibaro music television program, Borinquen Canta, where Silverio Pérez was host and because of this, he assembled them; Morales, Olivo and Pérez, for what they expected would be a one-time show.

Bob MacCoy, then entertainment editor for the Star suggested the title. The result was, "El efecto de los rayos gamma sobre Eddie Lopez" ("The effect of gamma rays on Eddie Lopez", now known as Los Rayos Gamma or “Los Gamma” for short), the name being a take-on on the then-current play The Effect of Gamma Rays on Man-in-the-Moon Marigolds.

The string of sold-out shows in late 1968 turned into a sensation. Using his charismatic sense of humor, Eddie López managed to get sworn political enemies into one room and have them all laugh at themselves. The strategy worked, and some claim the show helped ease political tension in Puerto Rico.

== Death ==
Eddie died on November 26, 1971, in San Juan, Puerto Rico at the age of 31. His last shows were done from a wheelchair with an oxygen tank by his side, and his very last show occurred three days before his death. His funeral was attended by governors, senators, colleagues, and members of the media.

In 1972, a book of his collected works, The Best of Eddie Lopez (selected by Lopez himself) was posthumously published by Ediciones Puerto, Inc. with a prologue by Juan M. Garcia-Passalacqua.

Shortly after his death, the Overseas Press Club of Puerto Rico, which had awarded him a citation for coverage of the Dominican Republic's 1970 elections, announced that it would establish a yearly award to "most distinguished contribution to journalism" known as the Eddie López Special Award.

After his death, Los Rayos Gamma would go on as scheduled per his request. "The show must go on" Lopez had insisted. Friend and fellow comedic actor, Efraín López Neris (already added to the roster) would take Eddie's place, while an empty chair would be left on stage in his honor. Eventually, "Los Gamma" became a popular TV show, and ultimately would make its way back to the stage just around each election year, this time with the help of well known comic Sunshine Logroño filling Eddie's shoes.

His satirical journalism style is still taught at the University of Puerto Rico, and his Los Rayos Gamma troupe continued to perform for decades after his death.
