= Esto no tiene nombre =

Esto no tiene nombre (Spanish: "This has no name") may refer to:

- Esto no tiene nombre (magazine), international Latina lesbian magazine founded by tatiana de la tierra
- Esto no tiene nombre (tv show), Puerto Rican comedy show sometimes featuring Eddie López (journalist)
