= Horacio Olivo =

Puerto Rican actor and comedian

- Born: Horacio O. Olivo Báez; April 12, 1933; Dorado, Puerto Rico
- Died: July 24, 2016 (aged 83); San Juan, Puerto Rico
- Occupations: Actor; singer

Horacio Olivo (April 12, 1933 – July 24, 2016) was a Puerto Rican actor, comedian, and television/radio personality, as well as a classically trained singer. Born in Dorado, Puerto Rico, he got his start in show business in 1949 at long defunct WNEL as a radio soap opera actor. Olivo participated in various Festival Casals concerts as a tenor in the chorus section, his voice was described as "privileged", "smooth and firm". He also acted in various plays during the Puerto Rican and International Theatre Festivals, was the station announcer for all the WIPR stations (WIPR, WIPR-FM, and WIPR-TV), and acted in comedy TV shows like Como está la situación, and Esto no tiene nombre, produced by Tommy Muñiz. Olivo was the booming voice behind Los Rayos Gamma for more than four decades.

== Entertainment career ==
Still a child, Olivo participated in an event held for Felisa Rincón de Gautier at Las Casas in 1946, the show was led by master of ceremonies Héctor L. Almodóvar and he sang the Puerto Rican danza "A orillas del mar". He made appearances in other official activities, including one where he performed décimas in a homage for Grace F. Tugwell for her support of infant food initiative Programa de Alimentación Infantil. By 1949, Olivo had become a recurrent radio telenovela artist at WNEL. Within two years, he was recognized and gained celebrity as a radio personality and became involved with television as well. Olivo would also make appearances in other stations, including Radio Católica where he participated in their Holy Week programming. He was involved in a comedy sketch as part of a telemarathon that marked the television debut of Carmen Belén Richardson. During the Korean War, Olivo was among those drafted in 1954. This interrupted his role in the action series Espionaje. As an actor, Olivo appeared in a television adaptation of Mariano Azuela's Los de abajo: Relato de la Revolución Mexicana where the physician recounts his version of several experiences that he lived during the Mexican revolution along Pancho Villa.

In May 1962, Tiempo Muerto took the stage a Teatro Tapia as part of the Institute of Puerto Rican Culture's (ICP) Festival de Teatro Puertorriqueño, with a cast that included Olivo as "Juanito". The play was a three-set tragedy based on the hardships of the Puerto Rican rural folk known as jíbaro that was directed by Leopoldo Santiago Lavandero and also featured Esther Sandoval, Alberto Zayas, Benjamín Morales, Myrna Vázquez and Víctor Arrillaga. On May 10, 1962, the cast of the play received a feast from the director and his wife Camelia Jímenez Malaret. His performance was labeled as "formidable", along the rest of the supporting cast. In May 1963, Olivo participated in the Festival de Teatro Puertorriqueño with an adaptation of Manuel Méndez Ballester's La Feria. Directed by Santiago Lavandero, the cast also included Johnny Sáez and Héctor V. Suárez. The following year, Olivo returned to the Teatro Tapia for another edition of the Festival del Teatro Puertorriqueño. His participation was in another play directed by Lavandero, Todos los ruiseñores cantan, a three-set comedy set in Brisas del Caribe, a fictionalized version of a well known restaurant of San Juan during the 1930s. The play also featured its author Carlos Rechani, Gilda Galán, Paquito O’Neill, Luis Vera, Charlie Gibbs, Art Beddard, Rosa Blanca Menéndez, Iris Martínez, Juan González and Orlando Rodríguez, Frankie Gauthier, Mario Betancourt, Luis Irizarry, Olga de Carlo, Benjamín Morales and Mazo y su grupo. His performance in a secondary role earned a positive reception from the press. Olivo joined the rest of the cast in a cocktail offered in their honor held at the ICP.

He also participated in a public education campaign by acting in Seguridad para un futuro mejor, aired by the government-owned WIPR-TV and directed by Carlos Samalot Machado. In October 1964, Olivo joined Lucy Boscana, Myrna Vázquez and Félix Monclova in Elin Ortiz's adaptation of Cayetano Coll y Toste's La campana del ingenio which also aired trough WIPR-TV. In October 1964, Un Sombrero Lleno de Lluvia was presented before a sold-out crowd at Teatro Salvador Brau in Santurce to open a season in the venue that included raising funds for the Junta Local de Maestros de San Juan. In 1966, Olivo returned to the Festival de Teatro Puertorriqueño by appearing in a secondary role in Luis Rechani's Mi Señoría. The play was a three-set tragifarce led by Benjamín Morales, Estela de la Lastra, Walter Busó, Orlando Rodríguez, Félix Antelo, Delia Esther Quiñones, Marcos Betancourt, Luis Alberto Martínez, Esther Mari and Francis Santiago del Río in the main roles. His role as "Corneta" was well received, but media criticism argued that it outshined his second role when the character ascended to "Director of the Conservatory" due to the more stereotypical depiction of the elite. When Camuy inaugurated its Cultural Center, Olivo was invited to participate in two of the three inaugural plays, joining Jacobo Morales, Elín Ortiz (who also directed), Digna Guzmán and Myrna Vázquez in El Pegajoso and El Enfermo.

In December 1966, Olivo played a secondary role an adaptation of Jacques Deval's El comprador de horas as part of the ICP's Festival de Teatro Internacional held at Teatro Tapia and presented by the troupe Compañía Teatro El Cemí. The show was directed by Alberto Zayas and headlined by Javobo Morales and Lillian Hurst, with a supporting cast that included Laura Martell, Luis Carlo, Estrellita Artau, Ray Francisco Quiñones and Cuca Pence. Olivo was praised for staying in line with the essence of the character "Sargento". During that month, Elín Ortiz also presented an encore of El Pegajoso and El Enfermo as part of Compañía Teatro El Cemí at Escuela Pasarell, with the sponsorship of the ICP, Centro Cultural de Comerío and the Puerto Rico Instruction Department. The plays, which were presented as part of Estampas Puertorriqueñas de Abelardo Díaz Alfaro repeated the cast of the previous event with Olivo, Morales, Vázquez, Guzmán and Betancourt. During the summer of 1967, the plays were presented at summer camps with the same ensemble.

During this timeframe, Olivo also acted in La Cuarentona presented at Teatro Tapia as part of Carnaval de 1867 at San Juan. The play was directed by Piri Fernández de Lewis and the cast included Ortiz, Raúl Ayala, Silvia del Villare, Roberto Martínez de la Torre and Joe Lacomba. In September 1967, Olivo returned to the Festival de Teatro Internacional by participating in El Fabricante de Deudas at Teatro Tapia with Compañía Teatro El Cemí. The play was directed by Alberto Zayas and the cast included Ortiz, Betancourt, Carlo, Alicia Moreda, Ricardo Palmerola, Delia Esther Quiñones, Efraín Berrios, Janice Marietti, José L. Marrero, Walter Rodríguez, Irene Pérez, Jaime Ruiz Escobar, Juan Miranda Alfonso and Luis Cosme. His role as "Segarra" received possible reviews due to its comedic potential. Entertainment writer Miguel Ángel Yurnet stated that the performance was "embroidered".

In November 1968, Olivo participated in activities held at the University of Puerto Rico (UPR) to commemorate a hundred years of the Grito de Lares which included adaptations of plays and music by Luis Llorens Torres, José Antonio Corretjer, Réne Márqués and Luis Rafael Sánchez. Between September and October 1969, he joined the Aristeo Rivera Zayas adaptation of Michael Gazzo's drama Un Sombrero Lleno de Lluvia by the Cooperativa Nacional de Artes Teatrales (COOP-Arte) at Barrio Obrero. The play was supported by the municipality of San Juan, with the actors performing as part of Teatro Moderno. The cast included Myrna Vázquez, Samuel Molina, Evelyn Souffront, Vicente Vázquez, Carlos González and Adrián García. The following month Olivo returned to the Festival de Teatro Internacional by playing a waiter in the farce comedy Ay papá, pobre papá, en el closet te enganchó mamá y que pena me da at Teatro Tapia. The play was directed by Roberto Rodríguez Suárez with a cast that also included Adrián García, Velda González, Félix Antelo and Silvia de Villare along her group El Coqui folkloric ballet. The play was presented at Teatro Tapia in January and February 1970.

Afterwards, Olivo participated in an adaptation of Ricardo Talesnik's La Pereza for the Teatro La Rueda troupe, which was staged at the Puerto Rico Bar Theatre at Miramar and Casa España. The play was directed by Andrés Quiñones Vizcarrondo and headlined by José Luis Marrero and also included Norma Niurka, Esperancita Martínez, Manuel Codeso and Miguel Millares. His role in the play was well received by the media, with emphasis being given to receiving the largest ovation between scenes. In June 1970, Olivo returned to the Festival de Teatro Internacional in the comedy La extraña pareja presented at Teatro Tapia by Compañía Teatro El Cemí. The play directed by Alberto Zayas was headlined by Ortiz and Luis Antonio Rivera and included Johnny Miranda, Betancourt, Rosa Blanca Menéndez, Iris Chacón and Tino García in the supporting cast. His character work received some criticism from the press, due to being hard to understand while speaking. In September 1970, an encore of La Pereza was presented at Teatro Tapia with the same ensemble. His acting in this play was positively commented upon by the press. In October, Un Sombrero Lleno de Lluvia had its encore at the COOP-Arte theater and he returned to the cast. Olivo made an appearance as part of the supporting cast in the Hollywood comedy Bananas, which debuted in April 1971.

In its inaugural season the sociopolitical satire El Efecto de los Rayos Gamma sobre Eddie López broke attendance records at the theater of the Colegio de Abogados and began an island wide tour. His singing as a tenor in the act was well received and described as "unbeatable" by journalist Manuel Rivera Matos. Olivo made his return to the Tapia for another edition of the Festival de Teatro Internacional in an adaptation of J.B. Priestly's Llegaron a una Ciudad presented by Teatro La Máscara. Directed by Axel Anderson, the cast also included Helena Montanbál, Adela Villamil, Johanna Rosaly, Lolita Berrio, Ricardo Palmerola, Armando Roura, Pilar Arenas and Benjamín Morales. After its initial run at Teatro Tapia, the play was also presented at Teatro La Perla and the Club de Oficinistas at Mayagüez. By then an established celebrity, Olivo was given the role of timid bank worker "Malcolm Stritton" in Llegaron a la Ciudad, during which his acting was credited as "true interpretative refinement" in its dramatic intention and "his best ever".

During the summer of 1971, an extended version of El Efecto de los Rayos Gammas sobre Eddie López returned to the Colegio de Abogados for another season. During this time, the press emphasized his ability to parody everyday situations in songs that were presented with good quality despite their sardonic content. When the Puerto Rican Independence Party (PIP) celebrated its 25th anniversary, Olivo was one of several artists that participated in a concert held for the occasion at Country Club. In November 1971, Los Efectos de los Rayos Gammas sobre Eddie López was presented at the Sheraton Hotel for a season and as a special attraction at the Festival de Teatro Latinoamericano at COOP-Arte. When Eddie López died due to cancer, the rest of the cast decided to continue presenting the play in the hotel his honor. López was replaced by Efraín López Neris and later by Tommy Muñiz, as the play continued a strong run. Olivo also joined the cast of the television comedy series Esto no tiene nombre. He served as announcer in the late night show “Medianoche Diferente” with Richy Ray and Bobby Cruz. A reboot of El Efecto de los Rayos Gamma sobre Eddie López in its original format was sponsored by Fundación Eddie López. Olivo also performed in the PIP's 26th anniversary event, which was dedicated to the Puerto Rican youth.

When Puerto Rico was invited to the Seminario de Locutores Hispanoparlantes by Neftalí López Páez, Olivo was among several narrators that vouched to create a local federation of narrators, an initiative that had begun but been later abandoned more than once before. During this time, he also served as narrator in Illia Laborde's short film “Reflexión”, which documented the life of programmer Luis Ignacio Guardiola. After some artists boycotted a concert organized by the PIP due to the expulsion of former gubernatorial candidate Noel Colón Martínez in 1973, Olivo decided to side with the party and performed along a second group of artists that played at the event. In August 1973, Olivo appeared in Jacobo Morales' monologue play Muchas gracias por las flores organized at Teatro Tapia. The cast also included López Neris, Blanca Rosa Meléndez, William García, Gabriel Suau and Fernando Rivero. His performance voicing and providing music and sounds was positively commented in the press. In October 1973, Olivo joined Lucecita Benítez, Chucho Avellanet, Dinorah Ayala, Gladys Rodríguez and Pedro Juan Figueroa in a show organized by the Asociación de Artistas y Técnicos del Espectáculo de Puerto Rico (APATE) at Teatro Sylvia Rexach in San Juan.

He returned to the Festival de Teatro Internacional in an adaptation of Thorton Wilder's Nuestro Pueblo organized by La Máscara at Teatro Tapia. The play was directed by Axel Anderson and the cast included Braulio Castillo, Pedro Juan Figueroa, Ineabelle Colón, Raúl Xiqués, Lolita Berrio, Luis Vera, Tigre Pérez and Marilú Marrero. Olivo was given the role of choral director Simon Stimson. Olivo participated in a course on radio correspondence offered by the Liga de Cooperativas de Puerto Rico along Ray Francisco Quiñones, Eda Celia Oliver, Alberto Zayas, Catín Ballesteros, Raffi Torres, Vicente Vázquez, Félix H. Rivera, Freddy Gutiérrez and Luis Vicens which through WIPR. In 1974, Olivo worked in dubbing the series Phoenix 5 for Telemundo. In March, He returned to the cast when Gracias por las flores was presented at the Ateneo Puertorriqueño.

He and the rest of the original cast were featured when Nuestro Pueblo was transmitted on television by WRIK-TV. In May 1974, Olivo returned to the Teatro Tapia for the Festival de Teatro Puertorriqueño in Cuento de hadas. The play was directed by Luis Torres Nadal and the cast also included Sylvia del Villard, Luz María Rondón, Joffre Pérez, Amneris Morales and Josie Román. During the summer of 1974, Olivo reunited with Teatro El Cemí when the ICP sponsored an adaptationof René Marqués' La casa sin reloj at Teatro Sylvia Rexach. The play was directed by Alberto Zayas, featured Myrna Vázquez and Marcos Betancourt and the cast also included William Agosto and Ángel Casiano. In August he appeared in an edition of WKBM-TV's El Súper Show Goya dedicated to actors/actresses that could sing, along Johanna Rosaly, Axel Anderson, Pilar Arenas and Sharon Riley. In October, Olivo joined WIPR's Radioperiódico El Espectador, a news program, as one of its narrators. To finish the year, he rejoined the cast of Muchas gracias por las flores when the play was presented at the Centro Nacional de Artes.

In January 1975, Olivo joined Teatro La Máscara's adaptation of Antonio Buero Vallejo's La Fundación presented at the UPR. The play was directed by Antonio García del Toro and the cast also included José Ángel, Axel Anderson, Luis Vera, Laba Nidia Díaz, Daniel Lugo, Leonel Vaccaro, Raúl Xiqués and Santiago García Ortega. During the spring, Olivo served as narrator of Doris Souffront's Folklore de Puerto Rico a través de sus bailes for the Departamento de Instrucción Pública. Returning to the Festival de Teatro Puertorriqueño for Teatro La Máscara, he was cast as "Doctor Peporro" in Manuel Méndez Ballester's two-act comedy Los Cocorocos. The play was directed by Axel Anderson and the cast included Luis Vera, Orlando Rodríguez, Miguel Ángel Álvarez, Iris Martínez, Rafael Cruzado, Rey Pascual and Jaime Bello. Olivo also appeared in the film socioeconomic critique Borinquen Habla, which aired as a direct to television production in November 1975. In March 1976, he rejoined the cast of Los Cocorocos when the play was featured at the Festival de Teatro de Ponce at Teatro La Perla.

In October 1976, Olivo participated in a political event held at Culebra performing along Lucecita Benítez, Davilita, Myrna de Casenave and Paquiro Muñoz. In March 1977, he joined La Máscara for the 13th Festival de Teatro at the Centro Cultural de Mayagüez. Olivo joined Adrián García, Walter Rodríguez and Raúl Carbonell Jr. in an adaptation of Jean Anouilh's tragic comedy “Orquesta de Señoritas”, playing the only character that does not crossdress. The play continued at Teatro Silvia Rexach, where it was a hit with morning and mantinee shows that ran for five weeks. From there Orquesta de Señoritas made additional appearances at Teatro Calimano at Guayama, Hotel Cerromar and the Municipal Auditorium at Caguas. To close the year, Olivo joined the PIP's Tele-marathon to raise funds for the 1980 campaign, joining 50 artists among which were Benítez, Danny Rivera, Alberto Carrión, El Topo, Casenave, Samuel Molina, Davilita, Pedro Rivera Toledo, Rosita Velázquez and others. During this time, Olivo was contracted as the moderator of the Cara a Cara con Colgate show, in which he hosted executives during the company's annual convention. When Tommy Muñiz purchased Muñiz's WRIK-TV, he joined dozens of artists there.

In 1978, Olivo was cast to appear in López Neris' Cándido en el Juego de la Bolita along Cristóbal Berrios, Ricardo Fábreguez and Velda González. He rejoined La Máscara in an adaptation of Choulak and De Cecco's tragic comedy El Gran Destape presented at the 15th Festival de Teatro Internacional. The play was directed by Axel Anderson and featured a cast with Benjamín Morales, Helena Montalbán, Rosario Andreu and José A. Rodríguez. It continued running at Teatro Tapia during the early months of 1979 as part of the Teatro '79 season. From there, the play continued at Centro Cultural de Mayagüez. Afterwards, Olivo joined several players at the Festival del Pueblo at Parque Luis Muñoz Rivera. He was part of the cast of Juan Carlos Ramos' television movie Año 1887: La Era del Componte as "Ulises Dalmau Poventud". In November 1979, Olivo participated at the PIP's tele-marathon, which featured several of the artists from the previous edition. Olivo returned to the Festival de Teatro Puertorriqueño when La Máscara revisited Los Cocorocos at Teatro Tapia. Afterwards, the play continued at Teatro Sylvia Rexach.

During the summer of 1980, Olivo rejoined Morales and Pérez for new presentations of El Efecto de los Rayos Gamma sobre Eddie López at the Café-Teatro La Tea. The play was also presented at the IV Festival del Pescador de Vieques. During this time, Los Cocorocos also held shows at Teatro La Perla at Ponce. Los Rayos Gamma continued their tour with several shows at Café-Teatro Tetuán 20 in Old San Juan, Parador Montemar at Aguadilla, Teatro La Perla and Centro Cultural de Orocovis selling out these venues. The play returned to San Juan with appearances at Miramar for the Puerto Rico Bar College. Los Rayos Gamma was then presented at Teatro Galaxie in Carolina, their debut in that municipality. Their popularity led to the creation of a new television series that aired on Telecadena Pérez Perry and beginning with a Father's Day special. During the early 1980s, Olivo appeared in Producciones Tommy Muñiz's Cosas del alcalde, which aired in the producer's station WRIK-TV. In September 1981, Los Rayos Gamma entered a hiatus after the channel changed ownership, during which they made presentations at Café-Teatro Tetuán. In October, the show resumed at Channel 7 on November 1, 1981. He was along several figures, including the rest of Los Gamma, that participated in the inauguration of Súper Siete following the sale of the channel. They continued performing in shows, making appearances at the Universidad Interamercana at San Germán.

In February 1982, Teatro La Máscara revisited Orquesta de Señoritas for a season at Centro de Bellas Artes, once again with Olivo as its puanist and sole male character. His performance received positive reviews, though by this time he was regarded as a "forgotten actor" after becoming more dedicated to political satire. The play them moved to Teatro La Perla for additional shows. Los Rayos Gamma continued their tour by performing at the theater of the University of Puerto Rico (UPR) at Río Piedras and at Villa Fontana in Carolina. He continued his parallel participation in Orquesta de Señoritas, which made its next appearance at the Centro Cultural de Mayagüez and then visited the UPR as well. In their television show, Los Rayos Gamma hosted governor Carlos Romero Barceló parodying his political career.

The group continued touring the island, transmitting from Colegio Bautista at Caguas, the Colegio Universitario Tecnológico de Arecibo, gathering sponsors such as Mitsubishi Motors. The quartet's performance was positively criticized, being praised for their capacity to mix the fun and pintoresque in their satire. In September 1984, Los Rayos Gamma presented Los Rayos Gamma en Concierto: Elecciones '84 at Centro de Bellas Artes, where they parodied the 1984 electoral season and included Tommy Muñiz and José Miguel Agrelot into their act. While the group agreed to take a hiatus following the recording of a special, Olivo continued working on the channel. They regrouped in March 1985, appearing in Chucho Avellanet's debuting show at Channel 7. Olivo returned by himself, becoming a recurrent element of the show's comedy sketches. After Morales' telenovela Tiempo para vivir was altered in a way that he disagreed, Los Rayos Gamma created their own satirical novel, in which Olivo played a paralyzed man since they felt that most works in the genre exhibited that type of melodramatic elements.

In September 1986, Olivo served as unseen narrator in Jacobo Morales' Los muchachos de la Alegría, which reunited Muñiz and Paquito Cordero after two decades of estrangement. In February 1987, Olivo served as the Rey Momo of the 15th Carnaval del Plata at Dorado. He also participated in SuperSiete's debuting show show, La magia de la señal along the other Gammas, Iris Chacón, Agrelot, Avellanet, Edgardo Huertas, Walter Mercado, Sandra Zaiter, Pepe Grandío, María Falcón and David Ortiz, among others. There Olivo joined Pérez in the show ¿En Serio…? Con Silverio, where he was given a section to sing a variety of romantic songs, which benefited from his voice and received requests. He was among the figures that supported the Casa del Artista retirement house when a donation of terrains was announced. With a loose concept Los siete del Siete would take over the prime time slot Thursdays, and be host by a number of local talents including Agrelot, Morales, Olivo, Avellanet, Carmen Jovet and Logroño. In January 1988, Los Rayos Gamma left Channel 7 for WAPA-TV and received a prime time slot, with Olivo having to clarify that he wasn't leaving the group on an election year. The show took on a more international approach, parodying the American primaries and the Moscow Summit. He received an homage from the Festival Azúcar, Guarapo y Melao. In August 1988, Tommy Muñiz hosted Olivo in his show Don Tommy Y Compañía.

Beginning in September, Los Rayos Gamma presented Indecisión '88 at Centro de Bellas Artes with Daniel Lugo as their guest. His role in the play was positively critiqued, an impersonation of Trio Los Hispanos in the skit "Hernán perdóname" was praised along his acting in the segment "Tormento político". Following the 1988 elections, Los Rayos Gamma show changed format and was renamed Gammavisión. In April 1989, Olivo rejoined Teatro La Máscara when it brought Orquesta de Señoritas back to Teatro Tapia with a new cast that included Andrián García, Jorge Ramos, José Ángel Rodríguez, Walter Rodríguez, Orlando Rodríguez and Juan Carlos Santa Cruz. His character was described as the "anti-heartthrob" and a solid performance that could have benefited from better pacing. He joined dozens of artists to help CREF raise funds in the “TeleOlimpiadas ‘89” transmitted by all major television stations from the Hotel Sands. By July 1989, the show returned to its previous name of Los Rayos Gamma, incorporating Johanna Ferrán, Georgina Borri, Lidiette Batista, Eric Pérez and Gilberto Suarez. Olivo participated in the celebration of WAPA-TV's 40th anniversary. In May 1990, Los Rayos Gamma returned to Centro de Bellas Artes accompanied by their television cohorts and Tommy Muñiz. The following month, they hosted the Noche de San Juan at Hotel Sands. On February 3, 1997, he participated in Los 75 años de don Tommy, a special dedicated to Muñiz's career.

=== Later years ===
Olivo had been partially retired from public life because of health-related issues: he had open heart surgery in October 2011. He nominally remained a part of Los Rayos Gamma, who filmed a comedy interview with him for their latest show in November 2011. However, Olivo suffered a cardiac incident on 22 November 2011. On July 24, 2016, Olivo died at San Juan's Pavía Hospital where he was interned since July 20 with various health complications. He was 83.

== Personal life ==
Olivo was born in Dorado to Horacio Olivo Sr. and María Luisa Báez and raised at Las Casas, a public housing development in Barrio Obrero. His father was a guitar player, and both of his parents were composers. He was the oldest of eight siblings, who were later involved in the music industry. One of them, Johnny Olivo, performed as a soloist, recorded hits during the 1970s and participated in the OTI Festival. His family moved to New York as part of the migration waves that affected Puerto Rico during the mid-20th Century, but Olivo himself remained active in Puerto Rico. The fifth sibling, Eddie Olivo, founded and headed the Puerto Rican plena collective, Los Pleneros del Quinto Olivo and also worked in WIPR as a video technician for 30 years. Olivo graduated from the Instituto Comercial de Puerto Rico, and studied for 3 years at the Puerto Rico Music Conservatory. He expressed his belief in preserving the traditions of Christmas in Puerto Rico, finding joy in walking around seeing people celebrating them. Olivo also disregarded the role of money as a priority in life, noting his opinion that all who think that being wealthy makes them better are mistaken, since the individual's own merits determine his true worth.

He was reportedly fired from his WIPR post because of his political beliefs (his was the official voice of the Puerto Rico Independence Party's radio spots), and for a while, he owned a fried chicken establishment in his hometown of Dorado. One of the Rayos Gamma's better known parodies was Olivo's hugely popular antagonistic ode to the U.S. Navy, based on Agustín Lara's song "Granada". On occasion, Olivo would publicly denounce the way that the government treated him, one instance being on June 6, 1974, when he revealed that the Police Bureau of Puerto Rico had procrastinated to process a Good Conduct Certificate requested in 1973.

In October 1972, COOP-Arte began an internal reorganization for which it created a committee to oversee the efforts, which included Olivo, Félix H. Rivera, Gloria Paniagua, William Valentín, Pedro J. Texidor and Illia Marrero. By 1982, Olivo continued working at WIPR-Radio but began experiencing health issues that led him to began treatment at the Fondo del Seguro del Estado, testing positive for 14 allergies and murcielaguina, which were blamed on the aging infrastructure of the government facility, receiving weekly vaccines. Entering 1986, Olivo took a role as spokesperson of the WIPR employees who demanded a salary increase along Jesús Vera Irizarry, which earned him the criticism of Roberto Vizcarrondo of the union Empleados de Radio y Televisión de WIPR, who sided with the administration in public expressions. After he missed a scheduled appearance for the WIPR-Radio news, the show was taken off the air without completing.

== See also ==
- List of Puerto Ricans
