= Los Rayos Gamma =

Puerto Rican comedy troupe specializing in political satire

Comedy career
- Years active: 1968–present
- Medium: Television; theatre
- Genre: Political satire
- Members: Sunshine Logroño; Jacobo Morales; Silverio Pérez
- Former members: Eddie López†; Efraín López Neris; Horacio Olivo†

Los Rayos Gamma is a Puerto Rican comedy troupe specializing in political satire. The group was founded in the late 1960s and is currently composed of:

- Jacobo Morales: actor, writer, director, comedian
- Silverio Pérez: musician, comedian, entrepreneur, host
- Sunshine Logroño: comedian, actor, host, singer, producer

Despite sporadic breaks in their tenure, the group has enjoyed constant success, having had several Puerto Rican television shows, and performing often around the island during their career.

== History ==
Eddie López, a journalist and writer for The San Juan Star, was responsible for writing a segment where Olivo and Trio Los Seis would parody popular songs with a relevant social message. When he was diagnosed with cancer, he took the concept and expanded it to create a political satire, with the intent of lampooning the current events of Puerto Rican politics, blaming all their wrongdoings and the parody itself on gamma rays (a pun on his current therapy against his illness). He then contacted friends Horacio Olivo, Silverio Pérez and Jacobo Morales to help him with the project. Morales had the idea of taking Eddie's written parodies and blending them with previously censored TV scripts to produce a political parody stage show. El efecto de los rayos gamma sobre Eddie López (a parody of The Effect of Gamma Rays on Man-in-the-Moon Marigolds) was first presented at Teatro La Tea with Morales, Pérez and Olivo as co-headliners. The title was then shortened simply to Los Rayos Gamma.

Blunt in its humor, the show proved a hit and was taken on tour throughout the island for eight months, with López dying shortly after his last performance. The journalist, however, requested that they continued and Efraín López Neris was brought in as a replacement. At every show an empty chair would be left on stage as a tribute to López. Shortly after, López Neris was also replaced with comedian Sunshine Logroño. The group joined Telecadena Pérez Perry which aired on Channel 11, facing some skepticism from the administration. The show enjoyed great success from 1968 to 1971.

After that, the group decided to take an indefinite break. In the late 1970s, however, Pérez contacted his friends to regroup. Enjoying the same level of success, they even had several programs on Puerto Rican television.

The group has continued their shows around the island, while each member also pursues his individual endeavors. They roughly reconvene every two years, usually previous to an election year.

After the Telecadena Pérez Perry went bankrupt, Los Rayos Gamma moved to Muñiz's channel, WRIK-TV. The group debuted on November 1, 1981, going on to become a hit. Muñiz then brought in politicians as invited guests including the presidents of the inscribed parties. Los Gamma participated in the inauguration of Súper Siete following the sale of the channel.

== The group ==
The "classical" line-up of Los Rayos Gamma features them all dressed in black (as to not allude to any political party in Puerto Rico, or more precisely, their insignia's colors). It features Silverio Pérez on guitar, Horacio Olivo (in his lifetime) in bongos and minor percussion, and Jacobo Morales using percussion only occasionally. A running gag among the group is that Morales can only sing by following visual cues (usually from Olivo, who was a strong percussionist and even danced onstage when propped) as to stay in rhythm; salsa singer Rubén Blades (who has sung onstage with the group in various occasions) joked about this by calling Morales "the black hole of clave". In reality, Morales can keep rhythm using clave sticks, or sing, but not do both at the same time. At the same time, Morales -for some unexplained reason, his partners claim- comes across as a very convincing tango singer.

Logroño, on the other hand, besides using the group's common black uniform, may also feature distinctive props, usually those alluding to his own comedic characters (for example, Vitin Alicea's beret), depending on a song's lyrics. He may play guitar, minor percussion, or other instruments, again, depending on each song.

The group's augmented lineup usually features a full orchestra, complete with horn section and chorus singers. It is frequently directed by keyboardist José "Cuqui" Rodríguez, who was also the musical director of many of Logroño's comedy programs.

=== Recent years ===
On August 15, 2008, the group performed in the first of a series of reunion presentations in the Centro de Bellas Artes de San Juan. This was one of their "farewell" tour's presentations and included Vico C as special guest.

On November 19, 2011, the group (without Horacio Olivo, who did appear in a comedic interview caught on video - he was recuperating from open heart surgery) performed in yet another series of presentations at the Centro de Bellas Artes de San Juan, this time billed as "Enfortuñados."

=== Olivo's death ===
On July 24, 2016 original member Horacio Olivo died at 83 after health complications.
