= Isabel Luberza Oppenheimer =

Puerto Rican brothel owner

Isabel "la Negra" Luberza Oppenheimer
- Isabel "la Negra" Luberza Oppenheimer, ca. 1950
- Born: 23 July 1901; Ponce, Puerto Rico
- Died: 4 January 1974 (aged 72); Barrio Maragüez, Ponce, Puerto Rico
- Cause of death: Shooting
- Resting place: Cementerio Civil de Ponce; 18.01352°N 66.63243°W
- Occupation: Brothel owner
- Years active: Mid 1930s - 1960s
- Children: Manuel Morales (adopted)

Isabel Luberza Oppenheimer (23 July 1901 – 4 January 1974), better known as "Isabel la Negra", (Note: lit. 'Isabel the black woman') was a Puerto Rican brothel owner and madam in barrio Maragüez, Ponce, Puerto Rico. Her name and her brothel, Elizabeth's Dancing Club, became part of Puerto Rican folklore both during her life and posthumously.

== Early years and youth ==
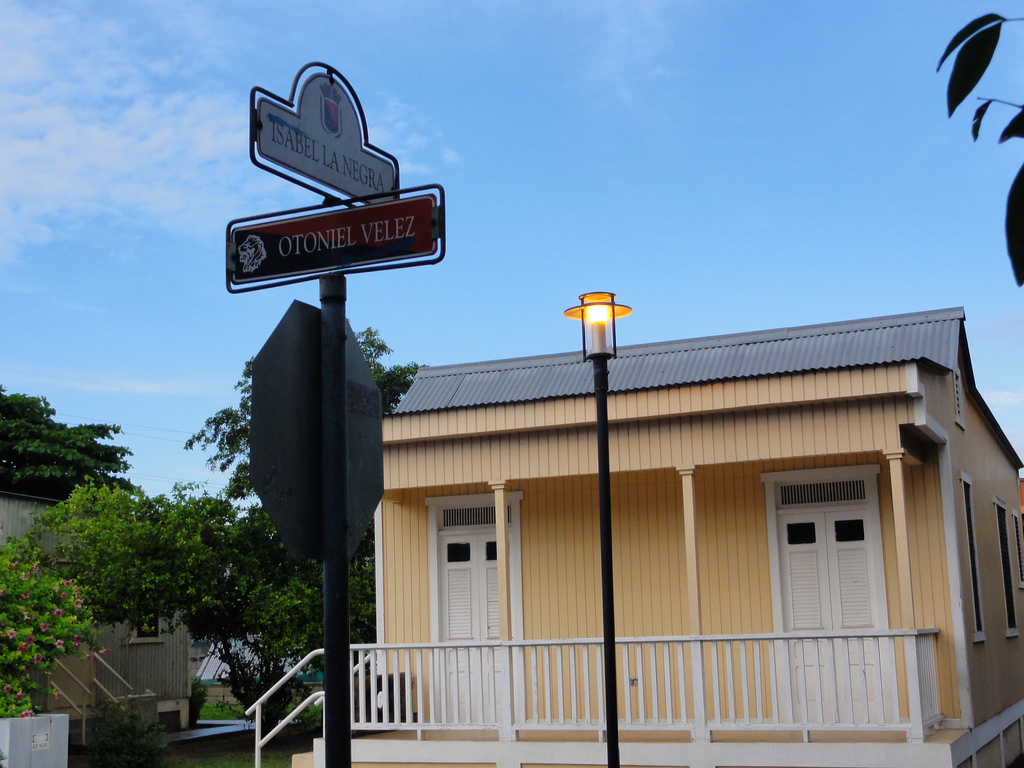
Street sign on Calle Isabel la Negra in Barrio San Antón

Isabel Luberza Oppenheimer was born in the San Anton neighborhood of Ponce, Puerto Rico, on 23 July 1901 to Joselino Luberza and María Oppenheimer. Apart from her business as a madam, well documented in many Puerto Rican newspapers such as El Dia and El Vocero, not much is known about her early life. One widely circulated version is that Isabel left home as a young teenager to live with a wealthy man only to find out that he was married. Another version says she dated and married a much older man, a wealthy American. A well researched and documented story of her life is presented by the prominent criminal attorney and businessman José Ángel “Chiro” Cangiano. In his legal documentary "Receso del Tribunal: Vivencias Judiciales of Jose Angel Cangiano" ("Courtroom Recess: Judicial Experiences of Jose Angel Cangiano"), he debunks those stories and documents Isabel's true story: As a young girl of the poor lower class in Ponce, Isabel fell in love with the son of a wealthy upper class homeowner in the city where her mother worked as a housemaid. The elegant gentleman, a young attorney, returned her love in various ways, including purchasing her a home where he would later enjoy her cooking and would occasionally also invite his professional friends, including attorneys, judges, and prosecutors, for socializing with their wives. Their romance, however, ended abruptly when Isabel, walking downtown with her cousin Norma, recognized her wealthy boyfriend as the groom in the nuptial caravan that passed her during her boyfriend's unannounced marriage to another girl, also a member of Ponce's upper class. Emotionally affected by the experience and "in a bath of tears", Isabel told her cousin Norma that "the man that from that day hence wants to enter my house has to pay a charge." Thus developed the beginnings of Isabel as a brothel owner.

== Business and career ==
From the late 1930s to the mid-1960s, she owned and operated her bordello in the municipality of Ponce. At that time prostitution was tolerated in Puerto Rico. Her bordello was allegedly visited by politicians, businessmen, and clerics, although this remains unconfirmed.

Dubbed by the public Isabel la Negra, she declared herself "Madame" of her brothel. Isabel had two brothels: one in Barrio San Anton and another one in Barrio Maraguez. Some sources claim that, while her brothel businesses made her quite wealthy, the Catholic Church did not accept her donations because of her past and the nature of her profession; but others state the she made many numerous well-received and significant contributions to the Catholic Church in Ponce. Also, for many years, she gave free toys and food to underprivileged children in Ponce on 6 January, Epiphany day (Three Kings Day, in Puerto Rico)

== Death ==
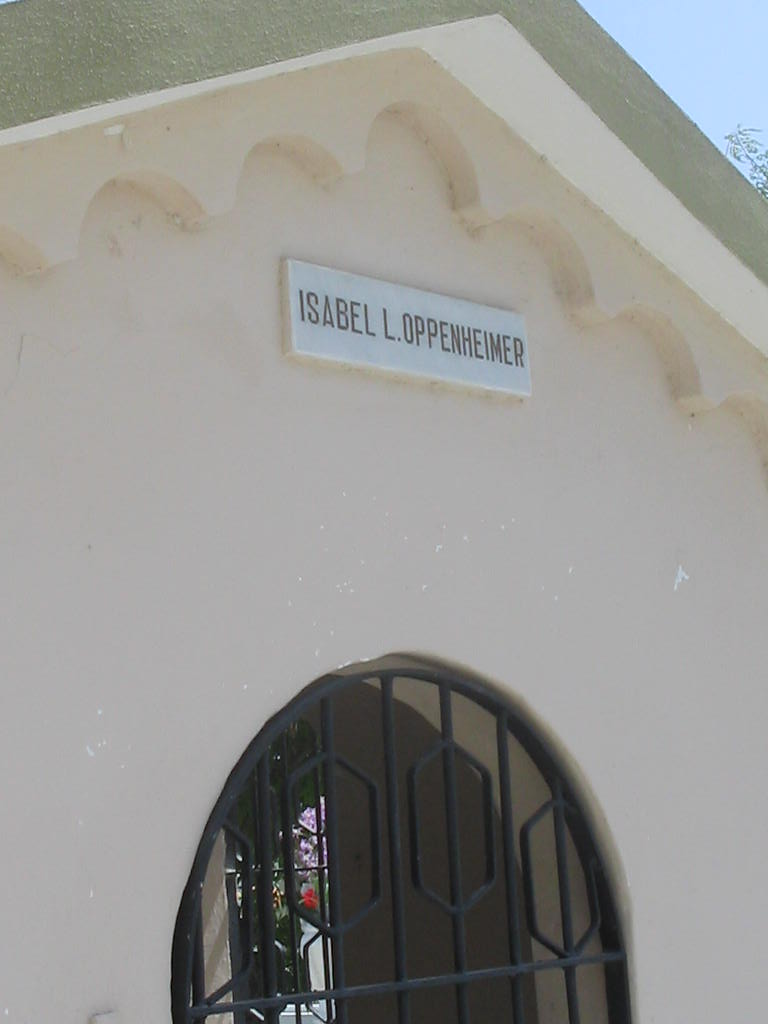
Structure housing Isabel La Negra's grave at the Cementerio Civil de Ponce, adjacent to Cementerio Católico San Vicente de Paul

Isabel la Negra was shot dead on 4 January 1974, an innocent bystander of a drug-related homicide which occurred near one of her establishments. She was 72 years old. She was buried at Cementerio Civil de Ponce. The Catholic Church, which she had allegedly supported for many years, refused to accept her body into the Ponce Cathedral as part of the ceremonies for her burial. In spite of, and some say as a consequence of, this over 13,000 people attended her funeral.

== Literary and media representations ==
Several of Puerto Rico's most important authors and filmmakers have been inspired by Isabel Luberza Oppenheimer's life and made works based on her experiences. In 1975, Rosario Ferré and Manuel Ramos Otero published two stories about Isabel la Negra in the literary journal Zona de carga y descarga. These stories were later reprinted in short-story collections by each author.

In 1979, a film about her life was released, starring Míriam Colón as Isabel, with José Ferrer, Raul Julia, Miguel Ángel Suárez and Henry Darrow. The film was titled A Life of Sin, and was directed by Efraín López Neris.

In 2006, Mayra Santos-Febres published a novel based on the life of Isabel la Negra titled Nuestra Señora de la Noche. The novel was published by Espasa-Calpe in Madrid, Spain (ISBN 84-670-2136-5).

== Legacy ==
There is a street in Ponce, crossed by Papo Franceschi street, and named to the memory of Isabel La Negra at Barrio San Antón, the community where Isabel la Negra was born and raised.

== See also ==
- List of Puerto Ricans
- German immigration to Puerto Rico
- Afro–Puerto Ricans
