= Nicolás Kanellos =

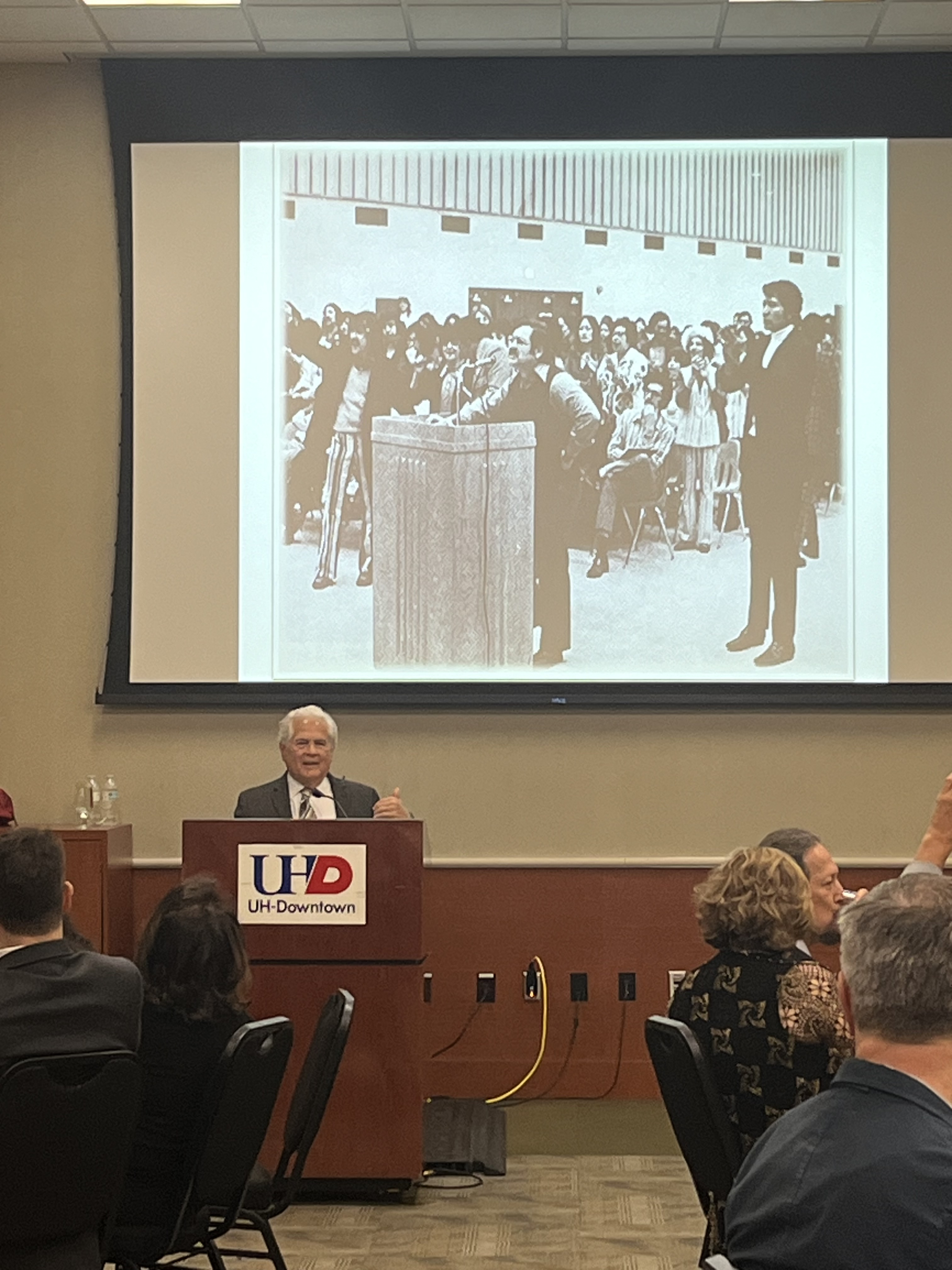
- Born: January 31, 1945 (age 81); New York City, New York, United States
- Education: University of Texas at Austin (MA, PhD); Fairleigh Dickinson University (BA)

Nicolás Kanellos (born January 31, 1945, in New York City, New York) is founder and former director of Arte Público Press, the oldest and largest Hispanic publishing house, as well as Revista Chicana-Riqueña, the first Hispanic literary magazine which later became The Amerícas Review. He is the Brown Foundation professor of Hispanic studies at the University of Houston.

== Biography ==
Nicolás Kanellos was born on January 31, 1945, in New York City, New York, to Puerto Rican and Greek parents. He grew up in Jersey City, New Jersey, near a commercial book bindery. His aunt, Providencia Garcia, developed the Latin division of one of the largest Latin music publishers in the world, and was a significant influence on him.

Kanellos earned a B.A. in Spanish literature in 1966 from Fairleigh Dickinson University and an M.A. in Romance languages from UT Austin in 1968 before earning his doctorate in 1974 in Austin as well. He taught Hispanic literature at Indiana University from 1971 until 1979, when he began teaching at the University of Houston and founded Arte Publico Press. Since its founding Arte Público Press has published over 600 books. While in Indiana he founded Revista Chicana-Riqueña with Luis Davila in 1972.

In 2025, Kanellos stepped down from Arte Público Press and Gabriela Baeza Ventura succeeded him as director.

== Awards ==
- 1969–1970, Gulbenkian Foundation Fellow
- 1976, Eli Lilly Foundation Fellow
- 1979, National Endowment for the Humanities Fellow
- 1979, Coordinating Council of Literary Magazines
- 1986–1987, Ford Foundation Fellow
- 1988, White House Hispanic Heritage Award for Literature
- 1989, American Book Award (publisher-editor)
- 1996, Denali Press Award, American Library Association
- 2014, Enrique Anderson Imbert, North American Academy of the Spanish Language
- 2016, Cruz de la Orden de Isabel la Católica

== Selected publications ==
- Kanellos, Nicolás (1999). Nochebuena: Hispanic American Christmas Stories, Oxford University Press, ISBN 978-0756778606
- Kanellos, Nicolás (2001). Herencia: The Anthology of Hispanic Literature of the United States, Oxford University Press, ISBN 9780195138252
- Kanellos, Nicolás (2011). Hispanic Immigrant Literature: El Sueño del Retorno, University of Texas Press, ISBN 978-0-292-74394-6
