= Just Dance =

Just Dance may refer to:

- Just Dance (video game series), developed and published by Ubisoft
  - Just Dance (video game), the first game in the series, 2009
- "Just Dance" (song), a 2008 song by Lady Gaga
- "Just Dance", a 2017 song by Lala Hsu from The Inner Me
- Just Dance (album), a 2023 album by Inna, or its title song
- Just Dance (Indian TV series), a 2011 Indian dance-reality series
- Just Dance (South Korean TV series), a 2018 television series
