= A Life of Sin =

- Directed by: Efraín López Neris
- Written by: Emilio Díaz Valcárcel
- Starring: Raul Julia; Míriam Colón; José Ferrer
- Cinematography: Álex Phillips Jr.
- Edited by: Gloria Piñeyro
- Release date: 1979
- Running time: 112 minutes
- Countries: United States; Puerto Rico
- Language: English

A Life of Sin is a 1979 Puerto Rican-American drama film directed by Efraín López Neris and starring Raul Julia, Míriam Colón and José Ferrer.

== Premise ==
Paulo (Raul Julia), a Caribbean peasant and Isabel (Miriam Colon), a politician's mistress, open a brothel that becomes internationally famous. Though they gain wealth and power, the one thing that Isabel wants continues to elude her.

== Cast ==
- Míriam Colón as Isabel Luberza Oppenheimer
- Raul Julia as Paulo
- Henry Darrow
- Miguel Ángel Suárez as Mario
- José Ferrer as The Bishop
