= Christmas in Puerto Rico =

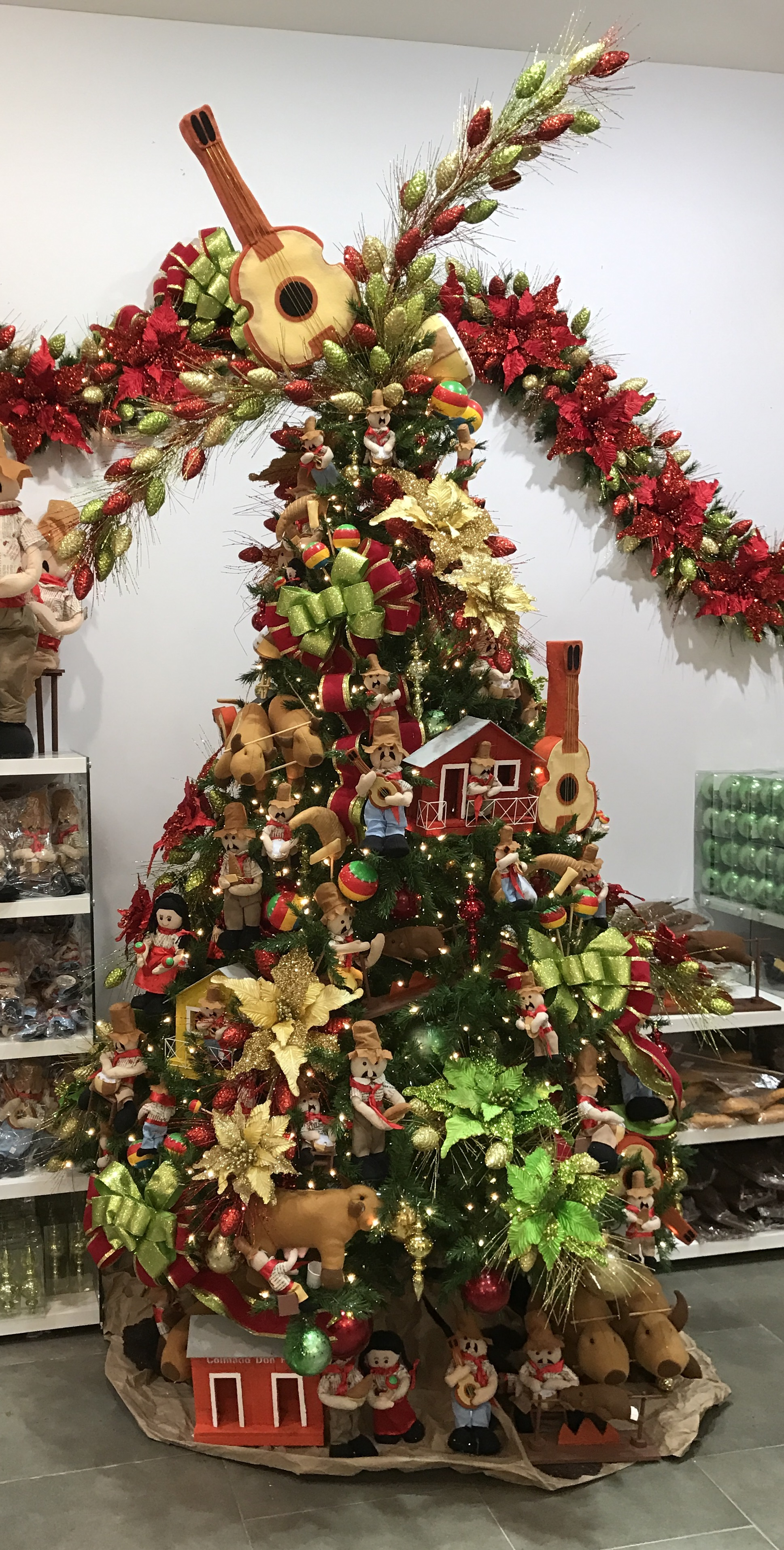
A Christmas tree adorned with several traditional motifs.

Extending from the last week of November to late-January, the celebration of Christmas in Puerto Rico is among the longest in the world. Commercially, stores sell Holiday merchandise as early as September. Product of a complex political history, autochthonous tradition has emerged along elements borrowed from Spain and later the United States. Among members of the Puerto Rican diaspora, Christmas is the period of the year where local traditions are practiced more openly.

The long-standing cultural prevalence of Catholic practices adopted from Spain serve as the main basis of Puerto Rican Christmas tradition, but Protestant elements have systematically been merged into them after American sovereignty was imposed over the archipelago by the Treaty of Paris. Most of the Hispanic influences can be seen in the practice of seasonal masses (i.e. Misa de Gallo and Misa de Aguinaldo), the music (i.e. Las Tunas, Décima, Parranda, Aguinaldos, Seises, Villancicos, etc.) and the actual celebration of Christmas, Three Kings Day, Santos Inocentes and the Octavas. External influence is most evident in the adoption of Santa Claus and the Christmas Tree, but also includes the handing of gifts on the 25th and the popularization of some Christmas Carols. In Puerto Rico, models of Bethlehem are displayed (a Spanish vestige) along American-style ornaments and decorations.

== History ==
=== Spanish colonial administration ===
When and where Christmas was first celebrated in the Americas is unclear, but it is believed that it was aboard a Spanish caravel somewhere near the Greater Antilles. Among the proposed theories is that Martín Alonzo Pinzón celebrated the first along the crew of La Pinta, while anchored at a bay in modern-day Aguada. In Puerto Rico, the Spanish traditions mingled with others of Taíno and African origin, leading to an endemic syncretism. The introduction of the Misal with the Misas de Aguinaldo in Puerto Rico dates back as far back as 1512, and their actual practice took place during this early period of colonization. These masses come to a close with the Misa de Gallo, also called the Rooster's Mass, which is held at midnight on Christmas Eve.

As with other places in Latin America, the core of the Christmas celebration remains the same festivities, the Christmas Eve feast, the midnight mass and the exchange of gifts for Three-Kings Day. However, a period of two to three weeks where people participate in public and private festivities where Afro-Caribbean rhythms are predominant differentiates it from other Iberoamerican locations.

=== American colonial administration (1898–1952) ===
From 1898 to 1930, Puerto Rican children had to attend school on Three Kings Day since the celebration was not part of the American tradition. Emphasis was still given to the Catholic narrative of the Nativity and the Three Kings Day festivity as the predominant religious element of Christmas, despite the Protestant aspects introduced with the new administration, mainly due to being passed down via oral tradition. This has been noted as conflicting with Anglo-American traditions and linked to a historic resistance to assimilate culturally, intrinsically tied to the ongoing status of Puerto Rico as an unincorporated territory of the United States. Aware of this trend, the colonial administration made attempts to massify the figure of Santa Claus, with efforts that included Commissioner of Public Instruction Juan Bernardo Huyke's book A Story of Santa Claus. Published during the 1920s, the story changed traditional elements that included eliminating the North Pole and reindeers and added Catholic elements, in an attempt to gain traction among Puerto Rican children. Despite this, during the first half of the 20th Century local authors parodied the Americanization project, with the figure of Santa Claus itself being vilified as foreign and imposed, notably leading to the dueling narrative of Abelardo Díaz Alfaro's Santa Clo va a La Cuchilla (1947), in which several rural children that are only aware of the local customs mistake a teacher dressed as Santa Claus for the Devil.

== Celebrations ==
=== Religious ===
Placing grass in a box -meant for the camels of the Three Kings- is traditional in Puerto Rico. Despite this, the depiction of the trio riding on horses is common, as it is more akin to Puerto Rican history. In certain municipalities, the depiction of the Three Kings has become a tradition of its own, such as the Reyes Cantores Isabelinos and the Reyes Juanadinos. The latter are the most perduring representation, dating back to its 1884 creation by priest Valentín Echevarría, and have traveled throughout Puerto Rico and abroad, visiting places like Cuba and the Vatican. The Stars that compose Orion's Belt, part to the constellation which is visible during winter, are folklorically associated with the Three Kings and are celebrated in a fashion that the Star of Bethlehem is as well. Informal masses mixed with music and aguinaldos were held for the Three Kings as part of the Catholic tradition of Promesas, promises that were made throughout the year in exchange for help with some issue. If one of these promises was perceived as fulfilled, they would be commemorated for years and, in some cases, from generation to generation. The Baptist Church of Caguas began organizing a "living tree" in 1989, with a large tree cover concealing a chorus.

=== Associated ===
The Día de los Santos Inocentes is celebrated on December 28, and it is characterized by lighthearted pranks and festivals were people wear costumes meant to symbolize Roman centurions in commemoration of the Massacre of the Innocents. New Year's Eve is part of the Puerto Rican Christmas season. The gift-giving ends with Three Kings Day, which still receives cultural precedence and marks the end of the traditional Latin American season. In Puerto Rico, however, the Octavas (or Octavitas) are celebrated for eight consecutive days and then followed by the Fiestas de la Calle San Sebastián beginning on January 20 (the week of Día de San Sebastián). The Fiestas de la Calle San Sebastián were first held as a religious celebration in 1957, headed by priest Padre Madrazo and his brother Higino. Afterwards, several neighbors held a reunion at the house of Rafaela Balladares de Brito to revive the tradition. From there the event was revived as a festival which featured artisan elements (such as the Cabezudos), music and arts craft with modern elements. The event has grown to attract island-wide attention and regularly attracts more than 500,000 guests. Natural trees were traditionally burned on February 2, Día de la Virgen de la Candelaria. As open fires became prohibited, government disposing programs replaced the Día de la Candelaria.

== Other customs ==
=== Decorations ===
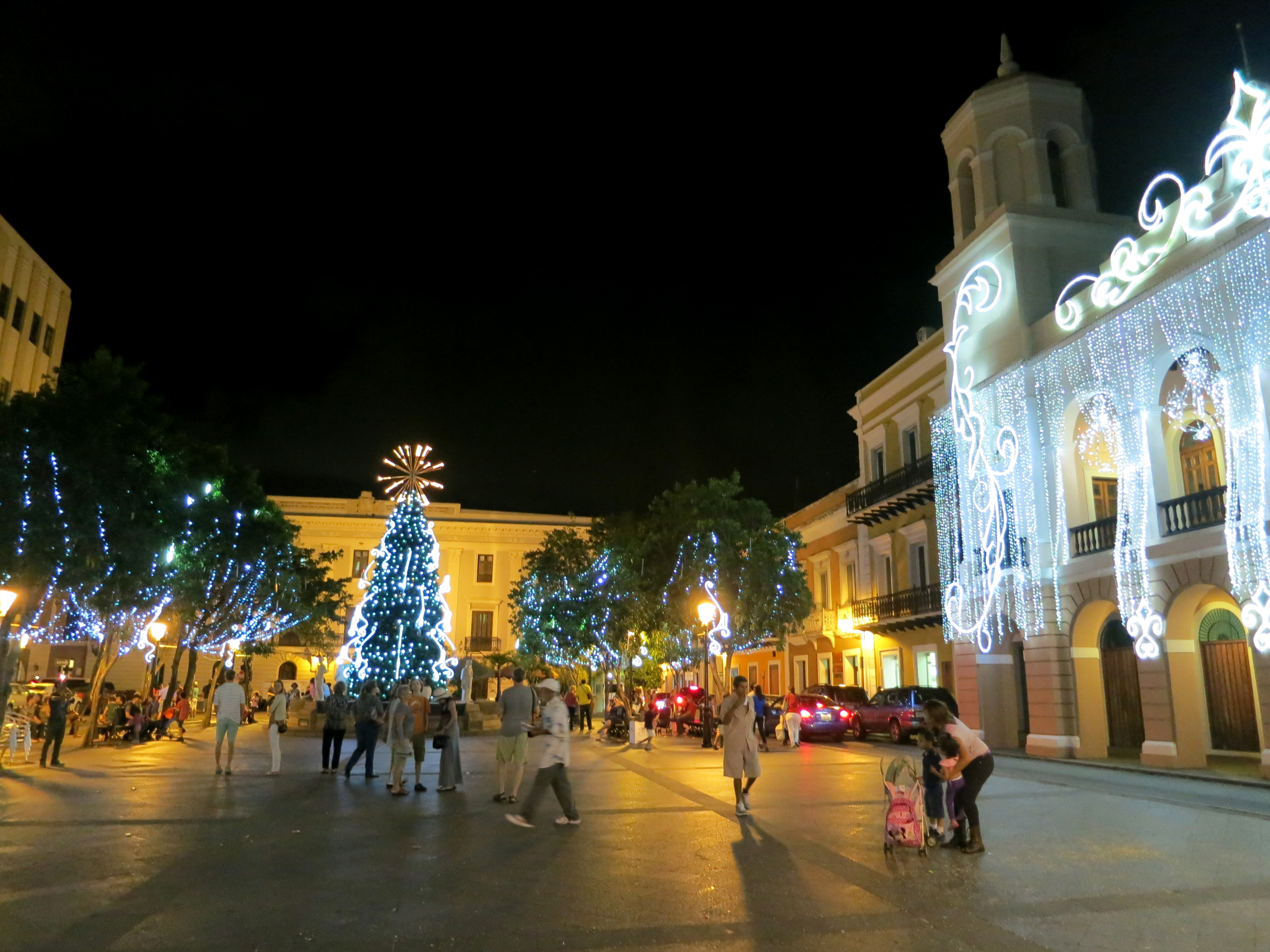
Decorations in Old San Juan.

According to Francisco Morales Padrón, in the early 1770s the first nativity pieces were ordered by Agustín Valldejuli and arrived to San Juan in the Catalan frigate San Francisco de Paula. By the 19th Century, the exhibit of Bethlehem dioramas (known in Spanish as Belénes) was widespread and used in conjunction to the playing of traditional music and of religious activities like the Promesas de Reyes. Catholic Churches (and their subsidiaries) and political entities, like the Capitolio and municipalities, still exhibit these stamps. The introduction of the foreign practice of the Christmas Tree (historically attributed to scientist Agustín Stahl, who began decorating his Bayamón house with one circa 1866) weakened the Belén tradition by the 1960s (with people replacing the pine with the local tintillo and adorning them with a host of makeshift materials), tough it survived side-by-side along the new arrival. Rafael Ángel de León became the first to cultivate a large crop of cupresus lusitanica for commercial use at Barranquitas, which was later substituted with imports and artificial trees.

In response, the late 20th Century saw the emergence of individual and collective initiatives such as Ángel David López's Ancus de Crey which work to revert this pattern and solidify the Belén practice through the collection of pieces and the introduction of a relevant festival. The figures relevant to the Three Kings Day and Bethlehem traditions are widely present in the work of Puerto Rican artisans, who represent these figures in their work throughout the year. The display of the pascua, including the local variant known as pascua jíbara is ubiquitous. The re-painting of houses in the weeks leading to Christmas is also common. The use of Christmas lights found its way into Puerto Rico during the 20th Century, becoming quickly widespread in households and businesses and has since grown to include both exhibitions and competitions. As the 21st Century began, the decoration became more sophisticated and grew to include mechanized or inflatable pieces.

=== Exchange of gifts ===
Historically, gifts varied depending on the economic background of who gave them and included things like traditional food, beverages, flowers and sweets. However, as with most other regions, the commercialization of Christmas changed this in favor of more ostensible and expensive presents (also leading to the introduction of practices such as Secret Santa) and a focus on publicity and consumerism that kickstarts with Black Friday. The government has benefited from this by introducing a special Christmas lottery. Christmas cards began being used in Puerto Rico during the 19th Century, presenting a convenient alternative to the traditional exchange of dishes. In 1950, Pava Print introduced Christmas cards personalized for the Puerto Rican public with art by local artists, which found popularity among both the public and the government.

== Music and food ==
=== Traditional music ===
Traditional Christmas music has been recorded for commercial use for nearly a century, with Manuel Jiménez and the groups Los Jardineros and Indiano being among the first. Parrandas or Trullas are a traditional form of improvised concert, in which a group of people join a group of friends (some of which must play an instrument such as the Puerto Rican cuatro or güiro) and visit houses singing these Christmas songs. When individuals are suddenly visited by a parranda without warning during the middle of the night, this is called an asalto. The term "Reyar" makes reference to the organization of these events in conjunction to the Three Kings Day celebration. Aguinaldos, rhymes, bombas, Seis Chorrea'o and other types of festive music are played during the trullas.

Seasonal songs have been gathered in publications such as La música folclórica de Puerto Rico, A tocar y cantar en Navidad, Parranda y tradición, Cancionero de décimas puertorriqueñas, seises y aguinaldos, Las Parrandas que nos unen en la Navidad and Cancionero navideño y método de guitarra sin maestro. Teaching courses for the cuatro usually include, or concentrate on, Christmas pieces. Modern lifestyle (with its lack of free time and limited access to some communities among other factors that work against the tradition) has reduced the amount of Parrandas in recent years, tough groups like Los Trulleros de Aquí and Los Parranderos Borincanos have continued it.

The Aguinaldo and Seis were born as the Puerto Rican jíbaros experimented with Spanish music and produced styles different enough to be considered separate genres. Likewise, Décima was born from the influence of Canarians arriving to the archipelago and has gained. The Seises, Aguinaldos and Décimas have gained popularity in contests were trovadors improvise lyrics, becoming known by the nicknames given to them. During the 19th Century, the traditional music group (and thus the standard assemble for Parrandas) was composed by a cuatro, triple, bordonúa, carracho and maracas. Several others (palitos, panaderos, güiro, bongo, conga, guitar, harmonica, mandolin, accordion, bandurria, bass, wind instruments, items with other uses like cowbells, etc.) were incorporated with the passage of time. The cuatro has become the main instrument of Parrandas in its role as national instrument of Puerto Rico, Tomás Rivera, Yomo Toro, Modesto Nieves, Eligio Claudio, Edwin Colón Zayas, Rolando Hernández, Quique Domenech, Ángel Trinidad, among other specialists have participated or produced in Christmas productions. There are over 140 Seis styles and 60 different styles of Aguinaldo.

Traditional music was played by jíbaros during the Americanization process that followed the Spanish-American War, ultimately outlasting it. Afterwards, it would continue to reflect sociocultural and sociopolitical topics. Since then, a number of artists and groups have gained notoriety for specializing in Christmas music, including Vicente Carattini y los Cantores de San Juan (continuing as Los Cantores de San Juan after the lead died in 2005), José Nogueras, Danny Rivera, Alfonso Vélez, Juan Antonio Méndez, Alfonso Vélez, Santo y la Tuna de San Juan, Los Cantores de Bayamón, La Trulla del Milenio, Odilio González, Grupo Paseo. The trova genre has produced several individuals invested in promoting Christmas tradition such as Andrés Jiménez (whose A Los Santos Inocentes won a Gold Disk), Mariano Cotto, Luis Miranda, Gloria Margarita, Ernestina Reyes, Priscila Flores and even families such as the Sanabrias (several including Julio César, Victoria), the Villanueva brothers (Ricardo and Eduardo) and the Morales brothers (Luis, Juan and Flor). Puerto Rico was the third jurisdiction where radio was inaugurated, arriving in December 1922.

Despite losing presence due to a shift of focus towards commercial music, Christmas themes have been played throughout the decades along traditional Puerto Rican music, which also receives a boost in exposure during these months. Season-specific programs like Navidad Querida, El espectacular and various Navidades en septiembre and "Christmas in July" events. The arrival of television decades later also contributed to the diffusion of seasonal music and tradition. Each station broadcasts a New Year's Eve event, while Banco Popular has its annual special aired since 1993, Christmas shows have been regularly produced, one-off jingles are aired during the holidays, as have local films based on local tradition or adaptation of foreign sources.

The Villancico, which in Puerto Rico has been adapted and popularized by the work of authors like Jacinto Veray and Moncita Ferrer, is commonly associated with the Tunas (i.e. UPR, Cayey, Taurina, San Juan, Interamericana, Juglares, Tunamérica, Segreles, Bardos, Chavalas de Puerto Rico, Cayeyana del Recuerdo, Las Alondras, UPR-Arecibo, Derecho PUCPR, Mayagüezana, San Blas, Imperial, Estilista, Allegro, Abonesa, Bayamón, Bacruv, Capitalina, Los Cantores de Puerto Rico, etc.) that both practiced the classics and introduced new ones during the Christmas season contributing a number of hits that became adopted into tradition. El Villancico Yaucano (1951) is among the most popular themes in the genre and gained international exposure when Plácido Domingo performed it at Viena in 1996, a country where it earned other adaptation. Groups from a related practice, Rondallas, have done the same.

=== Modern music ===
The 1950s marked the introduction of new themes to complement the traditional ones. Choral music, salsa and religious music have been adapted in Christmas productions. Cantares de Navidad (1952) remained the most Christmas popular song in Puerto Rico for over two decades. Several songs became well known during the second half of the 20th Century including El Ña, La Gallinita, Asómate al balcón, Levántate, El Coquí, La Escalera, Homenaje a la suegra, among others. Parody is a common subgenre of Christmas music which has been recorded by Efraín López Neris, Adalberto "Machuchal" Rodríguez, Angela Meyer, Víctor Santos, Susa y Epifanio, Luisito Vigoreaux, among others. An increase in the use of double entendres during the 1970s-80s (a stunt promoted by studios to increase sales) caused controversy, as it was perceived to violate the postulates of Christmas, leading to its momentum being drowned by a rash of moral productions during the mid-1980s.

Most pieces composed for commercial consumption combine traditional elements with mainstream genres, as is the case in Andrés Jiménez's A los Santos Inocentes. Tite Curet Alonso, Amaury Veray, Julio Alberti Hernández Fragoso, Baltasar Carrero, Cristino Maldonado, Herminio de Jesús, Julio Rodríguez Burgos, Mario Enrique Velázquez, Pedro Mulero, Carlos Rivera, Xandra Cortés, Pedro Flores, Felito Félix, Claudio Ferrer, Juan Ángel Nogueras, Pedro Juan Velázquez Poldo Castro, Esteban Taronjí, Héctor Campos Parsi, Pedro Ortiz, Silverio Pérez, Flor Morales Ramos, Manuel Jiménez, Jaime Pericás, Benito de Jesús, Luz Celenia Tirado and Alex Andino among many others, have composed seasonal pieces.

Mainstream artists and groups like the Puerto Rico Symphonic Orquesta, Rafael Hernández, Daniel Santos, Héctor Lavoe, El Gran Combo, Willie Colón, Gilberto Santa Rosa, Plena Libre, Los Turpiales, Felipe Rodríguez, Ismael Miranda, Raphy Leavitt y La Selecta, Richy Ray & Bobby Cuz, Roberto Angleró, Adalberto Santiago, Lucecita Benítez, Jerry Medina, Tito Rojas, José Feliciano, Las Hermanas Castillo, María Esther Robles, Víctor Manuelle, Felipe Rodríguez, Trío Los Antares, Chuíto el de Cayey, Felito Félix, Davilita, Salamán, Nydia Caro, Antonio Cabán Vale, Trío Vegabajeño, Sophia Hernández, Víctor Rolón Santiago, Chucho Avellanet, Marco Antonio Muñiz, Julio Ángel, Trío Los Condes, Sonora Matancera, Efraín Jataca, Cuarteto Los Hispanos, Conjunto Quisqueya, El Cuarteto Puerto Rico, Tony Croatto, Jesús Sánchez Erazo, Ángel Luis García, Bobby Capó, Octavio Ramos Pumarejo, Pete Rodríguez, Grupo Mapeyé, José Miguel Class, Trío los Andinos, Haciendo Punto en Otro Son and Menudo have composed or interpreted Puerto Rican Christmas pieces.

=== Seasonal gastronomy ===
Its traditional to hold family reunions during the season, in which seasonal food such as the Puerto Rican pastel, coquito, morcillas, tembleque, lechón asado, cuajito, arroz con gandules, potato salad, arroz con dulce, bilí, chichaíto, gandinga, mazapán, majarete, dulce de lechosa, punch, pitorro, almojábanas, etc. are shared. The pork used to make lechón asado has been traditionally eaten since Spaniards released a population into the wild during the 16th Century, later giving rise to the specialized business of the Lechoneras. In December, its consumption rises by 20% according to official statistics, as it is eaten roasted with rice with pigeon peas in Christmas and fried with viands in Three Kings Day. This traditional seasonal food has been documented in books like Picadera y antojitos para un jolgorio. Chicken soup was a common food given during parrandas.

On October 31, 1994, the Pedro Rosselló administration passed Public Law No. 120 prohibiting pitorro due to its incapacity to tax the beverage. The enforcement of this law was inefficient and mostly ignored by the police. In 2009, the government allowed artisanal preparation of pitorro with license, leading to the foundation of distilleries in Jayuya and Mayagüez (Destilería Coquí) and a fair in the latter.

== Socioeconomic influence ==
=== Annual migration and diaspora ===
The return of a significant portion of the diaspora has been noted during the season and chronicled in Mario Enrique's Vengan borincanos vengan. Those that cannot travel but retain connections in the island, receive traditional dishes through the mail, along with the imported tradition of Christmas cards. The diaspora at Hawaii, which is several generations removed from the first wave of Puerto Ricans to arrive in that archipelago, is known to still preserve the use of traditional music and dishes. Their preparation of pork, however, has grown different and abandoned the use of a stick for roasting. These Hawaiian descendants have learned local Christmas songs phonetically through oral tradition, despite not knowing the Spanish language, and the preserved the traditional music instruments (which have gained other names like cachi, cachi music).

=== Secular ===
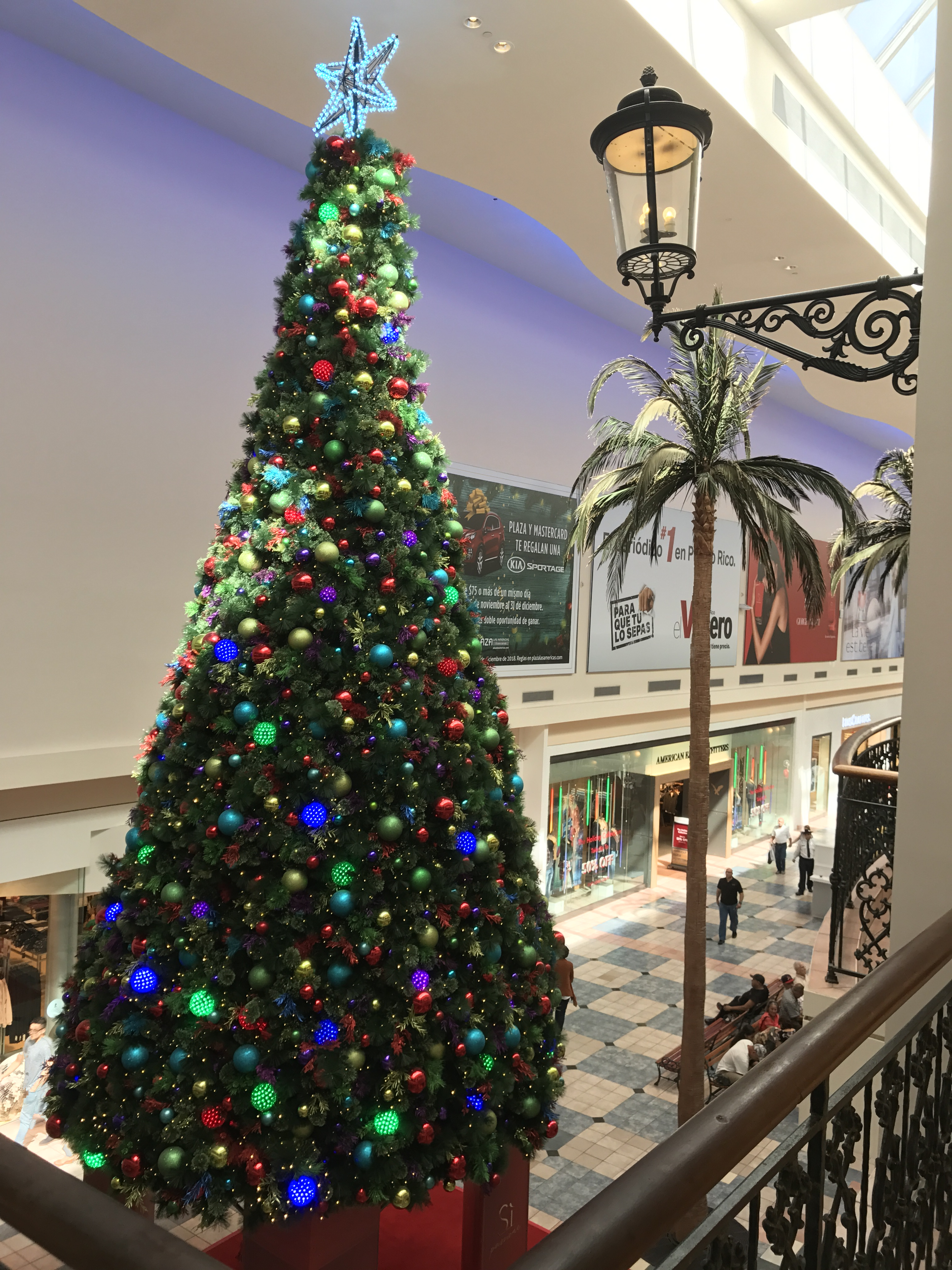
The Christmas decore of a mall in San Juan.

Shopping malls also combine the local and foreign (such as the Mall Santa) in their decoration themes. Ancestral rituals, such as the cleaning of a house, requesting wishes, burning lists of unfortunate events that took place during the lasts few months or lightning incenses, aromatic candles (or other strong smelling item), sprinkling sugar (a play on the idea of being sala'o, which means to have bad luck) in New Year's Eve are still practiced with the belief that they can ward off the negative aspects of the passing year and bring in good luck during the incoming one. The season has also inspired a number of lighthearted jokes.

=== Academic ===
From an academic perspective, the various practices have been documented in books and research papers. Parrandas of different varieties, on foot and on horseback, were detailed by Manuel Alonso in 1849's El Gíbaro. On January 9, 1889, the first appearance of a Santa Claus impersonator in Puerto Rican soil was recorded in the municipality of Ponce, bringing with it the gift giving aspect of the character. The tradition, however, failed to caught up with the local population who still favored the Three Kings throughout the first half of the 20th Century. On July 20, 1904, Dominican monks from Curazao relocated to Puerto Rico, bringing the figure of Saint Nick and Saint Nicholas Day (December 5) with them. The modern depiction of Santa Claus arrived later after being reimagined by Coca-Cola. The introduction of television, however, did affect the Three Kings Day tradition and give the character more exposure as a commercial item forcing parents to favor one of the dates for giving the fancier and most expensive gifts (the 25th being widely adopted due to the earlier date, which gives children more time to use toys before resuming school). Some Puerto Rican children have been noted to react with apprehension to the foreign figure, a cultural clash that is the subject of Abelardo Díaz Alfaro's Santa Cló va a la cuchilla.

Institutions also participate in non-religious activities, such as Architecture School of the Polytechnic University of Puerto Rico, whicg organizes contests with ornaments made from recycled materials. The patten of the Christmas lights has been observed from orbit, and studied in 2015 due to the longevity of the celebration in Puerto Rico (determining that the demand of electricity in the municipalities of San Lorenzo, Cidra, Naranjito and Bayamón exceed 40% over regular consumption).

=== Cultural symbolism ===
The Epiphany celebration and the figures of the Three Kings have been the topic of stories, plays, art, books, films, programs, songs (both mainstream, like La Protesta de los Reyes, and traditional, like the Décima Elegía de Reyes) and even entire music productions throughout the years. Monuments to the trio are found throughout Puerto Rico, several of them crafted by specialized sculptors like Juan Santos Torres or Naldo de la Loma. The municipality of Juana Díaz hosts the Casa Museo de los Santos Reyes, the first created exclusively to cover the topic of the Three Kings in the world and which houses a collection of music relevant to the celebration. In Puerto Rico, Melchor is identified as the Ethiopian member of the Three Kings, a depiction that varies throughout the region. The Three Kings as a collective are the patron saints of the municipality of Aguas Buenas.

=== Political ===
Among the festivities celebrated by the municipalities during the season include the Festival de los Reyes Magos del Barrio Naranjo (Moca), Festival de la Sopa (Ceiba), Festival del Mundillo (Moca), Festival de los Reyes Magos (Vieques), Festival Internacional de Cultura (Yauco), Festival del Pastel (Orocovis), Fiestas de Pueblo (Vega Alta), Festival de La Paloma Sabanera (Cidra), Festival Batey Criollo (Arroyo), Festival del Gandul (Villalba), Festival del Macabeo (Trujillo Alto), Festival de la Música de Rafael Hernández (Aguadilla), Festival del Lechón (Las Piedras), Festival Típico de la AAA (varies), Fiesta Jíbara de Toñín Romero (Ponce), Festival del Petate (Sabana Grande), Festival Renacer Navideño (Arroyo), Festival del Güiro (Quebradillas), Festival de la Montaña (Aibonito), Festival de las Máscaras (Moca), Festival de los Santos Inocentes (Hatillo), Festival del Niño y los Santos Reyes (Cayey), Festival de los Reyes Isabelinos (Isabela), Festival Tierra Mía (Arroyo) and Parada Navideña (Lajas), Féria Navideña (Carolina, Guaynabo, San Juan, Caguas). The diaspora also adopted these practices, celebrating them in the Puerto Rican tradition.

The encendido, an activity were the decoration is plugged in officially welcoming Christmas, is held in several municipalities and followed by Christmas festivals and Fiestas Patronales. The Bono de Navidad (lit. "Christmas Bonus") was first introduced on June 30, 1969, and given regularly for more than four decades. The 2008 financial crisis and the austerity measures promoted by PROMESA has affected this practice in both the private and public fields. On January 8, 2013, the Puerto Rico House of Representatives approved the creation of a touristic route of Christmas tradition. The initiative was approved into law by the Senate of Puerto Rico on July 30, 2014. Assorted gifts are annually given to the masses on January 6 by a number of political entities.

== Other ==
=== Records ===
An illuminated star was built in Caguas, Estrella de la Paz created by engineer José Julián Dávila, which at one point was considered the tallest such structure in the world (105 feet). In 2011, the municipality of Salinas assembled a 48-feet tree that was claimed to be tallest in Puerto Rico at the moment.

== Defunct practices ==
Among the traditions that have been lost are the systematic peregrination of a representation of Mary (which stayed in different houses each night) during the nine days of the Misas de Aguinaldo (which coincide with Advent). Likewise, the wearing of mantles by women during these masses. During the 20th Century, the character of "Año Viejo" (old and disheveled) was depicted by an individual during New Year's Eve, allowing the populace to take out their frustrations with the passing year by prancing them. The belief that the first day dictated the rest of the year for citizens and that the first twelve days would reflect the weather of the year. The wearing of certain colors (yellow for luck, white for health) or display of certain accessories (horseshoes, rabbit legs, etc.) during January 1. During the 20th Century, acquiring and browsing the material contained in the yearly Almanaque de Bristol was common. La Media Raja, an extension of celebration that extended beyond the Octavitas to precede Ash Wednesday.

== International perception ==
In a poll published in The Ottawa Sun, San Juan led a Top-10 list of places to spend the Christmas period. Although it's not a piece of traditional Puerto Rican music, José Feliciano's Feliz Navidad is one of the most successful Christmas pieces in history and the most widespread among those composed by a local artist.

== See also ==
- Culture of Puerto Rico
- Cuisine of Puerto Rico
- Catholic Church in Latin America
