= Efraín López Neris =

Puerto Rican actor

- Born: April 1, 1937 (age 89); Caguas, Puerto Rico
- Occupations: actor, comedian, producer and cinematographer

Efraín López Neris (born April 1, 1937) is a Puerto Rican actor, producer and cinematographer who has had a long trajectory in Puerto Rico's national artistic scene. Born in Caguas, he had his start in Puerto Rican television in the 1960s by joining the cast of various comedy shows. He produced and was the first host of La Cámara Cómica (a take on the popular American show Candid Camera).

As a television artistic director, he has done work on Marcano el show, El show de Luis Vigoreaux, Con lo que cuenta este país, El Gran Bejuco, and Burundanga. He has past credits as creative director of shows like Camara Cómica, El show de Tommy, Esto no tiene nombre, Los Garcia, Los genios and El show de López Neris. López Neris behind the camera work includes directing credits, being productions like El Corral, En la distancia, La ventana, La palomilla, Isabel la negra (A Life of Sin), Candido, El ultimo dia, and Caguas, centro y corazon de Puerto Rico.

== Entertainment career ==
Being an aficionado of cinematography from a very young age, López graduated from the University of Puerto Rico at Mayaguez, with post graduate studies at the Herbert Berghof Studio and Bown Adams Studio both in New York City, NY. Being mostly interested in the film industry, he spenttime traveling between Puerto Rico and New York seeking opportunities and exposition. He made his television debut appearing as Mr. Hernia in La criada malcriada, a job that he took due to a lack of money. In 1966, Efraín López Neris interrupted a reunion and suggested a candid camera segment to Muñiz and Modestti. After being ignored, he traveled to New York and acquired the services of Allan Font's sound engineer and with the help of Juan Emilio Viguié managed to get a camera, with which he filmed the pilot for La cámara cómica. Muñiz adopted the concept, which became a success in the ratings.

In 1971, López Neris published his first film, detective film La Palomilla. Production had been complicated, since he approached Columbia Pictures in 1969 but was only offered a partial coverage in exchange for adopting Mexican directors, which he declined. López Neris ultimately contracted personnel from Asociación de Productores, Artistas y Técnicos del Espectáculo (APATE) to complete the film. Columbia ended distributing the film. In 1979, he produced the English-language Isabel la Negra or Life of Sin, which featured José Ferrer and Miriam Colón.

López would spend months abroad working with films, but was given creative freedom and economic support when he returned to Puerto Rico. He would write a number of standup comedy monologues that became La barbería de Candido and aired in El show del mediodía. The segment had a slow start and a cold reception from the public, but Gillette and Harris Paint became interested in using it for advertisement. His "Candido" character had López portray an extremely naive married man who placed too much confidence in his wife and their mutual house painter friend ("mi amigo, el pintor"), whose profession led quite well to dozens of double entendres about his wife's proclivities, acknowledged by everyone but himself. The character soon became popular and its role as barber was not emphasized.

For the second incarnation of Desafiando a los Genios, López Neris would interpret Cándido, also introducing an elderly character known as Don Lolo and a tenor parody known as Don Florito. "Don Florito" parodied great opera singers and operatic arias, a concept that predated that of Adam Sandler's Opera Man by at least fifteen years. One of his sketches in this segment would inadvertently gave fame to filming director Nino Acosta, with the phrase Aquí, Nino, aquí becoming popular. His "Don Lolo" character was portrayed as a very old man with a very sharp tongue. He originally portrayed the character as having Parkinson's disease, a trait which he later discontinued after protests from patient advocates. For the short-lived Cooperativa de Artes Cinematográficas he produced a film named Mas allá del capitolio (a.k.a. La estatua de Don Rodrigo, Mas allá del capitolio) in 1963 but the film failed to meet economic projections. López Neris appeared in 1964's Nuestro regimiento based on the 65th Infantry Regiment and co-produced by Damián Rosa and José Díaz.

In 1968, López Neris participated in the crew of the first local talk show, El show de Tommy, along Flavia García. In the process, he was responsible for filming the first surgery aired on local television, despite being sickened by the experience. López Neris would do this again, including the filming of a kidney transplant for his brother. He was one of several script writers for the sketch show Esto no tiene nombre, which required several hours of writing per episode since it aired over a hundred different jokes per hour.

On October 19, 1995, a revival of Esto no tiene nombre was aired under the name Esto sigue sin nombre. On February 3, 1997, he participated in Los 75 años de don Tommy, a special dedicated to Muñiz's career. During the late 1900s and 2000s, López portrayed a dimwitted security guard named "Vázquez", with a penchant for food, Spanglish and politics, who is also a strong -and rather inept- supporter of the New Progressive Party of Puerto Rico (PNP). López played this character on some of Sunshine Logroño's comedic productions. López also had a popular radio program in his native city of Caguas, 'El Show de López Neris'. A comedic character from this era was Mister Ñemerson. He staged a fake hijack in one of his programs, which led to a police intervention, dozens of phone calls of concerned listeners to the radio station, protests by some of these when they learned that the hijack attempt was a hoax, and perhaps led to the cancellation of the program soon after.

As a film actor, López Neris has been cast in films such as Wedding Ring (CBS), Los que nunca amaron (Mexico), Mientras Puerto Rico duerme, La vida de Rafael Hernandez, Muchacha, Mas alla del Capitolio, Harbor Lights (Columbia Pictures), Up the Sandbox with Barbra Streisand, and more recently in Angelito mio.

His theatre credits include acting, directing and/or producing in plays such as La tia de Carlitos, Una sola puerta hacia la muerte, Amordio, Club de solteros, Sida, Yo, Juan Ponce de León, and Le pegue un cuernito.

Efraín Lopez Neris was once part of the 1960s political parody show El efecto de los rayos gamma sobre Eddie López (now known as Los Rayos Gamma). López Neris also contributed to the Ateneo Puertorriqueño as an advisor to the Sección de Cine y Video.
