= List of Puerto Rican films =

This is a list of films produced in Puerto Rico.

== 1909-1919 ==
Title	Director	Cast	Genre	Notes	Ref.
1909
Baile de Bomba en Cangrejos	Rafael Colorado D’Assoy		Silent, documentary		
La llegada del Gobernador Colton	Rafael Colorado D’Assoy		Silent, documentary		
Las fiestas del 4 de julio	Rafael Colorado D’Assoy		Silent, documentary		
1910
Labor Day	Rafael Colorado D’Assoy		Silent, documentary		
1911
1912
Un Drama en Puerto Rico	Rafael Colorado D’Assoy		Silent, drama, short	First (non-documentary) Puerto Rican film ever made	
Rosita Realí	Rafael Colorado D’Assoy	Rosita Realí	Silent	First Puerto Rican film to include the participation of an international artist	
Batallón Puertorriqueño	Rafael Colorado D’Assoy		Silent	Possibly presented footage of the Porto Rico Provisional Regiment of Infantry	
1913
Maffia Moderna	Rafael Colorado D’Assoy		Silent, comedy		
1914
Escenas de Puerto Rico	Francisco Maymón		Silent		
Una procesión en el mar	Rafael Colorado D’Assoy		Silent		
1915
Excursión de José de Diego en Santo Domingo	Rafael Colorado D’Assoy	José de Diego	Silent, documentary		
1916
Por la Hembra y el Gallo	Rafael Colorado D’Assoy, Antonio Capella		Silent, drama, romance		
El Milagro de la Virgen	Rafael Colorado D’Assoy, Antonio Capella Martínez	Marieta Picornell, María Asencio, Alberto Durero	Silent, fiction, religious		
Mafia en Puerta de Tierra	Rafael Colorado D’Assoy, Antonio Capella Martínez		Silent		
La Llegada de don Luis Muñoz Rivera	Rafael Colorado D’Assoy	Luis Muñoz Rivera	Silent, documentary		
Los funerales de Muñoz Rivera	Rafael Colorado D’Assoy		Silent, documentary	Documentary about the funeral procession of Luis Muñoz Rivera	
1917
Paloma del Monte	Luis Lloréns Torres	Aquiles Zorda, Clara Zorda, Gabriel Tejel	Silent, fiction, romance		
La viudita se quiere casar	Rafael Colorado D’Assoy		Silent, romance		
1918
1919
El tesoro del Pirata Cofresí	Juan Emilio Viguié		Silent, fiction		

== 1920s ==
Title	Director	Cast	Genre	Notes	Ref.
1920
1921
1922
La Perla del Caribe			Silent		
1923
La Colectiva	Juan Emilio Viguié		Silent, documentary		
1924
1925
1926
La Malaria	Juan Emilio Viguié		Silent, documentary		
1927
1928
1929

== 1930s ==
Title	Director	Cast	Genre	Notes	Ref.
1930
1931
1932
1933
1934
Romance Tropical	Juan Emilio Viguié	Ernestina Canino, Raquel Canino, Jorge Rodríguez, Sixto Cheummont, Cándido de Lorenzo, Pedro Miranda, Lotty Tischer	Romance	First-ever Puerto Rican film with sound and the second feature length Spanish-language film with sound in the world	
1935
1936
1937
1938
1939

== 1940s ==
Title	Director	Cast	Genre	Notes	Ref.
1940
1941
1942
1943
1944
1945
1946
1947
La caña	Jack Delano	Gustavo Palés Matos	Documentary	DIVEDCO	
1948
La Voz del Pueblo	Jack Delano		Documentary	DIVEDCO	
Informe al Pueblo No. 1	Jack Delano	Gustavo Palés Matos	Documentary	DIVEDCO	
Jesús T. Piñero	Jack Delano	Jesús T. Piñero, Camilo Fraticelli	Short documentary	Documentary on the reaction of Puerto Ricans on the appointment of Jesús T. Piñero as governor of Puerto Rico. Part of the DIVEDCO film catalogue.	
1949
Las Fiestas de Santiago Apóstol en Loíza Aldea	Ricardo Alegría		Documentary	DIVEDCO	
Excavando la Plaza Ceremonial de Caguana, Utuado	Ricardo Alegría		Documentary		
Una gota de agua	Jack Delano	Amílcar Tirado	Documentary, educational, short	DIVEDCO	

== 1950s ==
Title	Director	Cast	Genre	Notes	Ref.
1950
1951
Los Peloteros	Jack Delano	Ramón Rivero, Míriam Colón, José Manuel Matos, Amílcar Tirado, Perín Vázquez, Narciso Cobián, Daniel Colón	Sports	Second major film of Puerto Rico. Part of the DIVEDCO film catalogue.	
La Guitarra (Cinco siglos de música)	Jack Delano	Regino Sáinz de la Maza	Documentary	DIVEDCO	
Vecinos	Edwin Rosskam			DIVEDCO	
1952
Conozca a sus Pueblos: Arecibo			Documentary	DIVEDCO	
Conozca a sus Pueblos: Cabo Rojo			Documentary	DIVEDCO	
Una voz en la montaña	Amílcar Tirado	Antonio Torres Martinó	Drama, short	DIVEDCO	
Las manos del hombre	Jack Delano		Documentary, short	DIVEDCO	
El Pueblo En Acción			Documentary, short	DIVEDCO	
1953
Pedacito de Tierra	Benjamín “Benji” Doniger		Fiction, educational	DIVEDCO	
Puerto Rico elimina el arrabal	Juan Emilio Viguié	Gustavo Palés Matos	Short documentary		
1954
Cantares de Navidad		Leocadio Vizcarrondo y su conjunto	Musical	DIVEDCO	
El Puente	Amílcar Tirado		Fiction, drama	DIVEDCO	
Desde las nubes	Jack Delano	Antonio Torres Martinó	Documentary	DIVEDCO	
Escombros	Rolando Barrera	Manuel Beltrán, Magdalena Caballero, Osvaldo Camerón, Lili Flores, Aida Matos, Eduardo Medina, Eusebio Mesa, Leticia Mesa, Albert O’Neill, Baudilio Ramírez	Crime, drama		
1955
Nenén de la Ruta Mora	Óscar A. Torres	Rafael Benliza	Fiction, drama	DIVEDCO	
El de los cabos blancos	Willard van Dyke	Antonio Torres Martinó	Documentary	DIVEDCO	
Raíces de Felicidad	Henwar Rodakiewicz	Antonio Torres Martinó		DIVEDCO	
1956
Modesta	Benjamín Doniger		Drama	National Film Registry selection. Part of the DIVEDCO film catalogue.	
Elisa Tavárez	Jesús Figueroa		Documentary	DIVEDCO	
Danzas Puertorriqueñas		José Raúl Ramírez	Musical, short	DIVEDCO	
Ignacio	Ángel F. Rivera		Fiction, drama	DIVEDCO	
El Santero	Amílcar Tirado	Zoilo Cajigas Sotomayor, Antonio Torres Martinó	Documentary	Documentary about Zoilo Cajigas Sotomayor's artisan work. Part of the DIVEDCO film catalogue.	
Pablo Casals en Puerto Rico	Jack Delano	Pablo Casals, José Ramón de la Torre	Documentary	Documentary on Pablo Casals first visit to Puerto Rico	
1957
El Cacique	Benjamín “Benji” Doniger		Fiction, drama	DIVEDCO	
¿Qué opina la mujer?	Óscar A. Torres	Inés María Mendoza, Margot Arce de Vázquez, Rebeca Colberg, Antonio Torres Martinó	Fiction, drama	DIVEDCO	
Yo, Juan Ponce de León	Luis A. Maisonet		Historical documentary	DIVEDCO	
Cuando los padres olvidan	Amílcar Tirado	Everlidis Busútil, Alberto Zayas, Aníbal Lizasoín	Drama	DIVEDCO	
La plena	Amílcar Tirado	Antonio Torres Martinó, Gumersindo “Sindo” Mangual y su grupo de pleneros, Mon Rivera y su Ballets de San Juan	Documentary	Documentary about the history of plena. Part of the DIVEDCO film catalogue.	
Tres vidas en el recuerdo	Rolando Barrera	Niní Rodríguez, Miguel Miranda, Leticia Mesa, Antonio Moreno, Julio Torresoto, Erasmo Vando	Drama		
1958
Huracán	Benjamín “Benji” Doniger		Documentary	DIVEDCO	
El contemplado: isla cordillera	Amílcar Tirado		Documentary	DIVEDCO	
Mayo florido	Willard van Dyke, Luis A. Maisonet		Fiction	DIVEDCO	
Romance musical	Luis A. Maisonet		Fiction, musical		
El Secreto	Benjamín “Benji” Doniger	Eda Cecilia Oliver, Francisco Palacios, Juan Ortiz Jiménez, Brígida Pagán, Helen de Martínez, Juan A. Mart	Fiction, drama	DIVEDCO	
Machete	Kurt Neumann	Mari Blanchard, Ruth Cains, Albert Dekker, Juano Hernández, Carlos Rivas, Lee Van Cleef	Drama		
Danzas puertorriqueñas		José R. Ramírez	Documentary, short, music	DIVEDCO	
Parranda campesina	Amílcar Tirado	Gala Hernández y su grupo, Juaniquillo	Short, musical	DIVEDCO	
1959
Maruja	Óscar Orzábal Quintana	Marta Romero, Roberto Rivera Negrón, Mario Pabón, Helena Montalbán, Axel Anderson, Manuel Pérez Durán, Mona Martí, Víctor Arrillaga, Rafael Cortijo y su combo	Drama		
Juan sin seso	Luis A. Maisonet	Antonio Torres Martinó	Short film	DIVEDCO	
El Yugo	Óscar A. Torres		Fiction, drama	DIVEDCO	
Intolerancia	Luis A. Maisonet	Braulio Castillo, Lucy Boscana, Roberto Rivera Negrón, Manuel Pérez Durán, Frank Arredondo	Drama, romance	DIVEDCO	
Doña Julia	Skip Faust	Lucy Boscana	Documentary	DIVEDCO	
El Otro Camino	Óscar Orzábal Quintana	Axel Anderson, Rosaura Andreu, Ónix Báez, Chuíto el de Bayamón, La Calandria, Roberto Rivera Negrón, Norberta Perla, Ángeles Torregrosa, Víctor Arrillaga, Carlos Castillo, Armando Roura, Vicente Vázquez, Adelfa Díaz Chase, José Martínez, Wison Torres, Antonio Ramírez	Drama		

== 1960s ==
Title	Director	Cast	Genre	Notes	Ref.
1960
Sucedió en Piedras Blancas	Benjamín “Benji” Doniger	Marcos Betancourt	Drama	DIVEDCO	
Entre Dios y el Hombre	Rolando Barrera	Olga Alemán, Ángel Solís, Wally Vázquez, Ángel Rodríguez, Ángel Fonfrías, Tony Rigus, Rolando Barrera, Marcos Quiñones, Gloria Acela	Drama, romance		
Ayer Amargo	Amílcar Tirado	Marta Romero, Arturo Correa, Roberto Rivera Negrón, María Muller, Eugenio Navarro, Julia Margarita Fabián, Raúl Carbonell Jr., Alicia Moreda, Frank Arredondo, Cecilia Cavero, Delia Esther Quiñones, Víctor M. Hernández	Drama		
Así Baila Puerto Rico	René Martínez	Adalberto Rodríguez, Frank Arredondo, Paco Michel, Paquito Cordero, Pedrito Altieri, Joaquín Torregrosa, Ita Medina, Felipe Rodríguez	Musical		
Pedro Flores	Félix A. Ramírez		Documentary	Documentary on the life and work of Pedro Flores. Part of the DIVEDCO film catalogue.	
1961
Milagro en la Montaña	Amílcar Tirado, Iris Martínez		Fiction, drama	DIVEDCO	
Flight of the Lost Balloon	Nathan Juran	Mala Powers, Marshall Thompson, James Lanphier, Douglas Kennedy, Robert W. Gillette, Felipe Birriel, Leo Ledbetter	Adventure		
El resplandor	Luis A. Maisonet	Eugenio Navarro, Olga Lugo, Rey Francisco Quiñones, Orlando Rodríguez, José de San Antón, Víctor Santos	Historical	First anti-slavery film in Puerto Rico. Part of the DIVEDCO film catalogue.	
Belén	Michel Alexis		Drama	DIVEDCO	
Huellas	Rolando Barrera	Tony Rigus, Raúl Carbonell Jr.			
Los que no se rinden	Rolando Barrera				
Tres puertorriqueñas y un deseo	José de San Antón, René Martínez, José A. Ferrara	Braulio Castillo, Chucho Avellanet, Tino Acosta, Lito Peña, Lucecita Benítez, Pedrito Altieri, Carol Bajandas, Bernice Olivo, Raquel Bardisa, Peggy Rivera, Yayo el Indio, José de San Antón	Drama		
Obsesión	Mario Pabón	Berta Novoa, Mario Pabón, Carmen Junco	Drama		
El Gallo Pelón	Amílcar Tirado	José Miguel Agrelot, Frank Arredondo, Eva Alers, Américo Castellanos, Cecilia Cavero, Julio Torresoto	Drama	Due to its depiction of the jíbaro as naïve and comical, this film caused a rift among DIVEDCO personnel, which resulted in the government censoring and shelving it for many years.	
1962
Más allá del Capitolio	Amílcar Tirado	Braulio Castillo, Rafael López Neris, Axel Anderson, Chavita Marrero, Alicia Moreda, Walter Mercado, Daniel Luego, Félix Monclova	Fiction	DIVEDCO	
Palmer ha muerto	Juan Fortuny	Ricardo Palmerola, Inés Alma, Ónix Báez, Rosita Fornés, José Luis “Chavito” Marrero, Milagro Carrillo, Charlie Gibbs, Sammy Alfaro	Thriller, mystery		
Romance en Puerto Rico	Ramón Pereda	José Miguel Agrelot, Bobby Capó, Lillian Hurst, Tommy Muñiz, Orlando Rodríguez, Velda González, María Antonieta Pons, Gilda Mirós, Ramón Pereda, Frank Vidal, Dagoberto Rodríguez, Nelly Durán, Alicia Moreda, Adalberto Rodríguez, Luis Vigoreaux, Rafael Hernández Marín, Gloria Mirabal, Pólito Galíndez	Romance, musical		
Soñando nació el amor	Paquito Cordero	Paco Michel, Ita Medina, Nora Osorio, Sara Ayala	Comedy, musical		
1963
La casa de un amigo	Amílcar Tirado	Iris Martínez	Fiction, drama	DIVEDCO	
La noche de Don Manuel	Amílcar Tirado	José de San Antón, Braulio Castillo, Raúl Dávila, Norma Candal	Fiction, drama	DIVEDCO	
Una gota de sangre			Scientific documentary	DIVEDCO	
La Canción del Caribe	Rolando Barrera	Willy Chevalier, Margarita Estremera, Tony Rigus			
Los expatriados	Fernando Cortés	Mapy Cortés, Arturo Correa, Braulio Castillo, Adalberto Rodríguez, Maribella García, Luis Aguilar, Rafael Hernández Marín, Walter Busó, Aidita Mercado, Vicente Vázquez, Luis Lucio, Enrique Vázquez, Ángel Irizarry, Tony Dávila, Frank Vidal, Luis Vera, Julito Rodríguez, Jack Bolívar, Mario Cox, Angélica Morfi, Luis Vigoreaux, Gilda Galán, Miguel Ángel Álvarez, José de San Antón, Luis A. Martínez, Gladys Rodríguez, José Grajales hijo, Héctor Cordero hijo, Orlando Rodríguez, Ernesto Macmanus, Alberto López Perea, Blanca Moreno	Comedy, drama	This film is an ode to Rafael Hernández Marín's Lamento borincano	
Mi Borinquen querido	Juan Orol	Mary Esquivel, Arturo Correa, Lillian Hurst, Mona Martí, Víctor Santini, Vicente Vázquez, Francisco del Busto, José Manuel Caicoya, Félix Antelo, Luis Andrés Martínez	Drama		
1964
La Botija	Amílcar Tirado	Frank Arredondo, Andrés F. Quiñones, Elín Ortiz, Orlando Rodríguez, Edwin Avilés, Myrna Rosa Lugo, Hiram Caballero, Gilda Galán, Martita Martínez, Delia Esther Quiñones	Drama, fiction	DIVEDCO	
Bello amanecer	Tony Martínez	Braulio Castillo, Martita Martínez, Miguel Ángel Álvarez, Andrés Soler, Ofelia Montesco, Orlando Rodríguez, Chucho Avellanet, Olga Lugo, Evelyn Souffront, Titín Álvarez	Drama, romance		
Geña la de Blás	Luis A. Maisonet	María Judith Franco, Alberto Zayas, Víctor M. Hernández, Belén Ríos	Fiction, drama	DIVEDCO	
La Guardarraya	Marcos Betancourt	Roberto Rivera Negrón, Elín Ortiz, Gilda Galán, Felicita Reyes	Fiction, drama	DIVEDCO	
Tuna de Comerío	Luis A. Maisonet	Fidencio Alicea y la Tuna de Comerío	Musical, short		
El Hombre Esperado	Luis A. Maisonet		Historical	Life of José Pablo Morales. Part of the DIVEDCO film catalogue.	
El alcalde de Machucal	Paquito Cordero	Adalberto Rodríguez, Miguel Ángel Álvarez, Sonia Noemí, Luis Echegoyen, Eddie Miró, Frank Arredondo, Alicia Moreda, Luis Alberto Martínez, Charlie Gibbs, Tato Díaz, José Antonio Ayala, Wison Torres, Gilbert Mamery, Sandra Pacheco, Cachaco, Roque Navarro, Sylvia de Grasse, Damirón, José Ernesto Chapuseaux	Comedy		
Juicio contra un ángel	Federico Curiel	Angelito, Dacia González, Rafael Bertrand, Maribella García, Braulio Castillo, José de San Antón, Jesús Tordesillas, Ricardo Fabregues, Efraín López Neris, Luis A. Martínez, Tino García, Alicia Moreda, Orlando Rodríguez, Luis Vigoreaux, Peggy Rivera, Tino Acosta, Margarita Cossime, Jesús Carbonell hijo	Drama, adventure		
La vendedora de amor	Jerónimo Mitchell Meléndez	Gilda Mirós, Antonio Badú, Carlos Alberto Badías, Freddy Báez, Nydia Caro, Vicente Colón, Sigfredo Rivera, Atonia Rey, Felipe Rodríguez, Otto Sirgo	Drama		
Cuando acaba la noche	Julián Soler	Arturo de Córdova, Miguel Ángel Álvarez, Marta Romero, Orlando Rodríguez, Efraín López Neris, Manuel Pérez Durán, Walter Busó, Nydia Caro, Marga López, Tino García, Juan Boria, Vicente Vázquez, Gil de Ortega, Sara Cabrera, Fernando Robles, Berta Morales, Edwin Ramírez, Luis Lucio, Jimmy Talavera, Rafael Cepeda, Charlie Gibbs	Drama		
Mr. Dólar	Fernando Cortés	Luis Aguilar, Mapy Cortés, Braulio Castillo, Arturo Correa, Maribella García, Rafael Hernández Marín, Adalberto Rodríguez, Gladys Rodríguez, Miguel Ángel Álvarez, José de San Antón	Comedy, drama		
1965
Serenata	Luis A. Maisonet	Roque Navarro	Documentary, musical, short	DIVEDCO	
Chela	Amílcar Tirado		Documentary, drama	DIVEDCO	
La Esperanza	Luis A. Maisonet		Scientific documentary, educational	DIVEDCO	
El reto	Amílcar Tirado		Documentary, educational	DIVEDCO	
La Criada Malcriada	Gilberto Martínez Solares	Velda González, José Miguel Agrelot, Tommy Muñiz, Yoyo Boing, Jacobo Morales, Shorty Castro, Emma Rosa Vicenti, Esperanzita Martínez, Gladys Núñez, Miguel A. Negrón, Eva Alers, Tino García, Charlie Gibbs, Carmen B. Richardson, Héctor Modestti, Francisco Molina, Tony Rigus, Luis Aguad Jorge, Googie Santana, Pepe Luis Soto, Papo Román, Celinés, Rafael Cortijo	Comedy		
Millonario A Go-Go	Fernando Cortés	Adalberto Rodríguez, Chucho Avellanet, Baby Bell, Paquito Cordero, Elín Ortiz, Luis Alberto Martínez, José de San Antón, René Rubiella, Féliz Monclova, Alicia Moreda, Orlando Rodríguez, Gil de Ortega, Iris Figueroa, Milagros Carrillo, Charlie Gibbs, Delia Esther Quiñones, Vicente Vázquez, Walter Busó, Jack Bolívar, Edgardo Gierbolini, El Gran Combo, Cachaco			
Fernandito Álvarez y su Trío Vegabajeño		Fernandito Álvarez y su Trío Vegabajeño	Documentary, musical, short	DIVEDCO	
1966
Festival Navideño			Musical, documentary		
Su Salud			Scientific documentary	DIVEDCO	
La Ronda Incompleta	Óscar Torres		Documentary	Documentary on the patients of the Instituto Psicopedagógico of Puerto Rico. Part of the DIVEDCO film catalogue.	
Luna de miel en Puerto Rico	Fernando Cortés	Lucha Villa, Miguel Ángel Álvarez, Gilda Galán, Félix Monclova, El Gran Combo, Felisa Rincón de Gautier, Mapy Cortés, Fernando Cortés, Mario Pabón, Elín Ortiz, Paquito Cordero, Gilda Mirós, Soledad Acosta, Luis Lucio, Víctor Santos, Luis Alberto Martínez, Titín Álvarez, Efraín Berríos, Tito Lara, Néstor Zavarce, Marina Baura, Edgardo Gierbolini, Nelson Banks, José Hernández Sosa, Myriam Escalera, Julio Ángel	Drama, romance, comedy		
Machucal: Agente 0	Fernando Cortés, José de San Antón	Adalberto Rodríguez, Arturo Correa, Gina Romand, Luis Alberto Martínez, Delia Esther Quiñones, Vicente Vázquez, Paquito Cordero, El Gran Combo, Ita Medina, Lucecita Benítez, Camilo Delgado, Freddie Báez, Félix Monclova, Felipe Rodríguez, Luis Lucio, Charlie Gibbs, Nelson Banks, Mildred Díaz, Teresita Ruiz, Luis Hernández Zamora, Francisco Medina, Roberto Maurano, Raúl Méndes Jr., Roberto Villegas, Roque Navarro, Huracán Castillo, Efraín Morales, “El Tigre” Pérez, Luis A. Olivieri, La Pantera Negra	Comedy		
1967
Operación Tiburón	José de San Antón	Braulio Castillo Cintrón, Victor Mohica, Sonia Furó, Roberto Rivera Negrón, Maribella García, Raquel Bardisa, Ineabelle Colón, Ruth Cains, Lucecita Benítez, Arturo Correa, Sonia Infante, Tony Rigus	Crime, drama, musical		
La buena herencia	Amílcar Tirado	Benjamín Morales	Documentary	DIVEDCO	
Amor perdóname	Jerónimo Mitchell Meléndez	Julio Alemán, Kitty de Hoyos, Marta Romero, Braulio Castillo, Orlando Rodríguez, José de San Antón, Efraín López Neris, Delia Esther Quiñones, Víctor Santini, José Manuel Caicoya, Luis Alberto Martínez, William Agosto, Pedro Armendáriz Jr., Susana Cabrera, Eva Alers, Reynald Medina, José Hernández Zamora, Vicky Sanz, Juan Bautista	Drama, romance		
1968
Antesala de la silla eléctrica					
Olas y arenas	Óscar A. Torres	Sharon Reily	Musical, short	Interpretation of Sylvia Rexach's bolero “Olas y arenas”	
El satánico	José Díaz Morales	Miguel Ángel Álvarez, Libertad Leblanc, Gladys Rodríguez, José de San Antón, Alicia Moreda, Tino García, Rafael Muñoz Aldrete, Iris Figueroa, Juan Bautista, José Yedro, Vicky Hernández	Drama, crime		
Correa Cotto: ¡Así me llaman!	Orestes Trucco	Soledad Acosta, Arturo Correa, Braulio Castillo, Betty Ortega, Eppy Dueño, Luis Arroyo, Héctor Rosario, María Muller, César Córdoba, Alicia Moreda, José L. Dones, Radamés López, Manuel Rosado	Crime, drama	Based on the life of Antonio Correa Cotto	
El curandero del pueblo	Fernando Cortés	Adalberto Rodríguez, Lucecita Benítez, Héctor Cabrera, Daisy Ramos, Eddie Miró, Lucy Pereda, Paquito Cordero, William Agosto, Esther Marí, Nancy Cubas, Iris Martínez, Lolita Berio, Efraín Berríos, Clarissa Chapuseaux, Paquito Cordero Jr., Charlie Gibbs, Lúzaro Domínguez, Fernando Hidalgo, Mercedes Marchand, Luis Alberto Martínez, Johnny Medina, Aleidea Medina, Alicia Moreda, Raúl Nacer, Gil de Ortega, Matilde Pacheco, Eddie Ortiz, Judith Montano, Mario Previdi, Delia Esther Quiñones, José R. Ramírez, Emma Ramírez, Ivette M. Reyes, Estrella Rodríguez, Norma Santiago	Comedy, romance		
El derecho de comer	Leo Fleider	René Rubiella, Lissette Álvarez, Arturo Correa, Maribella García, Salvador Pérez Martínez, Frank Ferrer, José Manuel Caicoya, José de San Antón, Jaime Ruiz Escobar, Lolita Berio, Luis Antonio Cosme, Marta Jorge, Jorgito Font	Comedy		
El jibarito Rafael	Julián Soler	Orlando Rodríguez, Irma Dorantes, Pedro Vargas, Bobby Capó, Miguelito Valdés, Rita Colón, Felipe Pirela, Lope Balaguer, Sissie Petit, Luz Odilia Font, Charlie Robles, Estelita Lastro, María Luisa Landín, Julito Rodríguez, Wello Rivas, Davilita, Margarita Romero, Myrna Vázquez	Drama, musical	Based on the life of Rafael Hernández Marín	
Soñar no cuesta nada, joven	Glauco del Mar	Pedro Avilés Herrera, Perla Mar, Eppy Dueña, Eduardo Davidson, Bobby Cruz, Richie Ray, Joseíto Mateo	Drama, comedy		
Luisa tenía razón	Ramón Peón	Braulio Castillo, Martita Martínez, Mona Marti, Axel Anderson	Short documentary, drama		
1969
La Venganza de Correa Cotto	Jerónimo Mitchell Meléndez	Miguel Ángel Álvarez, Lucy Boscana, Betty Ortega, José de San Antón, Miguel Ángel Suárez, Pedro Cabrera, Jaime Ruiz Escobar, Alicia Moreda, Luis Alberto Martínez, Iraida Polanco	Crime, drama	Based on the life of Antonio Correa Cotto	
El Escuadrón del Pánico	Manuel Mur Oti	Raúl Dávila, Bobby Capó, Félix Monclova, Efraín López Neris, Jaime Sánchez, Ulises Brenes, Maribella García, Leo Anchóriz, Benjamín Morales, José de San Antón, José Manuel Bonilla, Joaquín Cordero, Ruth Cains, Camilo Delgado, María Soledad Romero, Carmen Sobremonte, Mirna Vázquez	War, historical drama	Story about the 65th Infantry Regiment's participation in the Korean War	

== 1970s ==
Title	Director	Cast	Genre	Notes	Ref.
1970
Arocho y Clemente: los que murieron en la horca	Miguel Ángel Álvarez	Jacobo Morales, Betty Ortega, Jaime Sánchez, Rometo Rochán, Miguel Ángel Álvarez, Félix Antelo, Edmundo Rivera Álvarez	Drama	Based on the real-life death penalty case of Carlos Arocho and Jacinto Clemente	
Fray Dólar	Raúl Peña	Velda González, Walter Busó, Víctor Ramos, Ricardo Bauleo, Víctor Barrera, Roberto Gómez Bolaños, Charlie Robles, Manuel Zarzo, Tito Hernández	Comedy, crime		
La Palomilla	Efraín López Neris	Ritchie Vélez, Efraín López Neris, Jaime Sánchez, Lucy Boscana	Crime, drama	Based on the life of notorious gangster José A. Gerena “La Palomilla”	
Luisa	Anthony Felton	Betty Ortega, José “Pepe” Fuentes, José Yedra	Drama	Based on the life of Luisa Nevárez Ortiz, the only woman to be sentenced to the death penalty in Puerto Rico	
Lebrón y Correa Cotto	Anthony Felton	Miguel Ángel Álvarez, Betty Ortega, Félix Antelo, Lolita Berio, Luis Vera, Marlene Gual, Aukie Herger			
La Carreta	José García Torres	Luis Vera, Lucy Boscana, Jaime Sánchez, Janice Marietti	Drama, short	Based on the play La Carreta by René Marqués	
1971
Mensaje de Navidad		Tuna Estudiantil de Cayey	Musical, short		
Fragmento	Luis A. Maisonet		Drama, short	DIVEDCO	
Maratón San Blas	Marcos Betancourt	Marcos Betancourt, Héctor Moll, Mariano Artau	Documentary	Documentary on the Maratón San Blas annually held in the town of Coamo. Part of the DIVEDCO film catalogue.	
Libertad para la juventud	Juan Carlos Codazzi	Chucho Avellanet, Rosa Haydeé, Frank Moro, Tino Acosta, Arturo Correa, Vilma Carbia, Richard Herd, Guillermo Villaronda, Rosita Perú, Mariano Artau	Drama, musical		
Yo Soy El Gallo!	Fernando Durán Rojas	José Miguel Class, Tino Acosta, Ofelia D’Acosta, Martita Martínez, El Tigre Pérez, Víctor Santos	Musical	Based on the life of José Miguel Class	
Culebra: el comienzo	Diego de la Texera	Rubén Berríos, David Noriega, Carlos Gallisá, Ramón Feliciano	Documentary	Documentary on the struggle of the people of Culebra in stopping the US Navy’s bombing and military practice on the island	
1972
Mataron a Elena	José Antonio Torres	José Antonio Torres, Eppy Dueño, Ángelo Ramírez, Olga de Carl, Olga Agostini	Drama		
Tú, mi amor	Arturo Correa	Frank Moro, Nini Caffaro, Arturo Correa, Norah Zurita, Helen Keene, Frank Bibeloni, Salvador Pérez Martínez, Rafael Solano, Esperanza Peynado, César Olmos, Divina Gómez, Mac Cordero, María Antonia	Drama		
1973
Adiós, New York, adiós	Damián Rosa	Andrés García, Blanca Sánchez, Velda González, Frank Moro, Alba Nydia Vélez, Elia Enid Cadilla, Perla Faith, Olga Agostini	Drama		
1974
El hijo de Ángel María	Fernando Cortés	Irán Eory, Miguel Ángel Suárez, Johanna Rosaly, Rolando Barral, Ángela Meyer, Mona Marti, Luis Alberto Martínez, Alberto R. Berríos, Ramón Forti, Marilyn Pupo, Emma Rosa Vicenti, Luis Daniel Rivera, Raquel Montero, Daniela Figueroa, Omar Galán, Benjamín Morales, Luis R. Llanos, Santiago García Ortega, Olga D’Acosta, Marina Rodríguez, Vicente Vázquez, Yolanda Barral, Carlos Gerardi, Gigi González, José Reymundí	Drama, romance		
La masacre de Ponce	Erick Santamaría	Betty Ortega	Action, drama, historical fiction	Fictional account of the Ponce massacre	
1975
El fugitivo de Puerto Rico	José Donate	Héctor Rosario, Betty López, Aladino Sánchez, Enrique González Abreu, Pelín Hernández	Crime, drama	Based on the life of Toño Bicicleta	
Toño Bicicleta: la leyenda de Puerto Rico	Glauco del Mar	Tommy Vargas, Alida Arizmendy, Colón Riozama, Amalia Cruz, Gladys Nuñez, Carmen Montijo, Ernesto Concepción padre	Crime, drama	Based on the life of Toño Bicicleta	
La tormenta	Erick Santamaría	Betty Ortega			
1976
Operación Alacrán		La Pandilla, Rubén López, Audrey Herger, Marí Blanca Ruiz Martínez, Francisco Javier Martínez, Francisco Javier López, Gabriel Jiménez	Adventure, comedy, musical		
El milagro de la Virgen de Sabana Grande	Alberto Salazar	Isaac Cuevas, Grace Torrens, Yolanda Vergara, Juan Manuel Miranda Soledad, Danny Torres, Marilú Marrero, Aida Rosa Cuevas, Tommy Torres, César A. Jiménez, Julio Irizarry, Antonio Pavón	Drama		
Ye Yo	Tony Betancourt	Ricardo Reyes, Eppy Dueño, Margarita Sosa, Carlos Roberto, Carlos Carrión, Paquito Navarro	Action		
1977
La Pandilla en Apuros		La Pandilla, Adrian Garcia, Felito Félix	Comedy, musical		
Destino Manifiesto	José García Torres		Documentary	Documentary based on the events leading to the Spanish-American War, Manifest Destiny, and its consequences on Puerto Rico	
Los Machos	Tony Rigus	Elia Enid Cadilla, David Ortiz Angleró, Félix Monclova, Héctor Rosario	Drama		
Natás es Satán	Miguel Ángel Álvarez	Miguel Ángel Álvarez, Frank Moro, Perla Faith, Caesar Córdova, Aníbal O. Lleras	Crime, drama, horror		
Siempre estuvimos aquí	Marcos Zurinaga	Pedro Zervigón, Idalia Pérez Garay	Documentary	Documentary on the role women have played in Puerto Rican society	
1978
Vida y poesía de Julia de Burgos	José García Torres		Documentary, short	Documentary based on the life and work of poet Julia de Burgos	
1979
Alicia Alonso y El Ballet Nacional de Cuba	Marcos Zurinaga	Alicia Alonso	Documentary	Documentary on Alicia Alonso and her company the Ballet Nacional de Cuba	
Nosotros, el pueblo de Puerto Rico - No a la planta de carbón en Aguada	Marcos Zurinaga		Documentary		
A Life of Sin	Efraín López Neris	Míriam Colón, José Ferrer, Raúl Juliá, Miguel Ángel Suárez, Henry Darrow		Life of Isabel la Negra	
Dios los cría...	Jacobo Morales	Norma Candal, Carlos Augusto Cestero, Pedro Juan Figueroa, Daniel Lugo, José Luis Marrero, Esther Sandoval, Luis “El Che” Tejada, Blanca Silvia Eró, Alicia Moreda, Luis Vera, Claribel Hernándex Colón, Carmen Despradel, José Artemio Torres, Andrés F. Quiñones, Otilio Warrington, Sully Díaz, Helga Umpierre, Catín Ballesteros, Marianne Pripps, Amalia Cruz, Myrna Escabí, Arlene González, Gilda Hernández, Milloe Rodríguez, Ana Rosa Zamora, Luigi Rivera, Frank Elías, Juan Ramón Guzmán, Virgen Jiménez, Catherine Franco, Taly Molina, Benjamín Morales, Jacobo Morales, Gladys Rodríguez, Miguel Ángel Suárez	Comedy, drama		
¿Cine en Puerto Rico, o cine Puertorriqueño?	Ricardo Méndez Matta	Pedro Zervigón, Axel Anderson, Tito Bonilla, Paquito Cordero, Jack Delano, Roberto Guastella, Roberto Gándara, Efraín López Neris, Jerónimo Mitchell Meléndez, Óscar Orzábal Quintana, Juan Emilio Viguié	Documentary	Documentary on the situation of Puerto Rican cinema from its beginnings in 1912 to 1979	
El deporte cómo expresión cultural de un pueblo	Luis Molina Casanova		Documentary	Documentary on the history of sports in Puerto Rico and its insertion in the idiosyncrasies of the Puerto Rican people	

== 1980s ==
Title	Director	Cast	Genre	Notes	Ref.
1980
A Step Away					
Angelitos negros	Mike Cuesta		Documentary, drama, music	Documentary that portrays through choreography a baquiné, a traditional Puerto Rican funeral for a child	
1981
Juan Ramón Jiménez: diario de un poeta	Luis Molina Casanova	Raúl Carbonell Jr.	Documentary	Documentary on the life and work of poet Juan Ramón Jiménez	
1982
Una Aventura llamada Menudo	Orestes Trucco	Alondra, Miguel Cancel, Johnny Lozada, Charlie Massó, Ricky Meléndez, Xavier Serbiá, Gladys Rodríguez, Ed Trucco, José R. Álvarez, José C. Betancourt, Danny Concepcia, Marcas A. Cuevas, Néstor de León, Marisol Gallisá, Omar García, Pascual García Peña, Francisco Hernández, Heidi Hernández, Gigi Krebs, Luis Lucio, Claudio Melani, Héctor Pedrosa, Germán Ufret Pérez, Carlos Marchand, Charlie Rivera, Ricardo Rivera, Osvaldo Rodríguez, Ricardo Rodríguez Merino, Gustavo Trucco, Dwight N. Vincent, David Flores	Adventure, musical, comedy		
El arresto	Luis Antonio Rosario Quiles	José Félix Gómez, Rafi Torres	Drama, documentary		
La Operación	Ana María García	Helen Rodríguez, Vicente Acevedo Ballester, Frank Bonilla, Antonio Silva, Gretchen Calindo, Orlando Castellanos, Emanuel Llescas, Frank Alcarín	Documentary	Documentary on the mass sterilization of Puerto Rican women during the 50s and 60s	
1983
Manos a la Obra	Pedro A. Rivera, Susan Zeig	Ilka Tanya Pagán	Documentary	Documentary on Operation Bootstrap	
La herencia de un tambor	Mario Vissepó	David Ortiz Angleró	Short documentary	Documentary on the musical traditions of bomba and plena	
1984
Conexión Caribe	Orestes Trucco	Chayanne, Rey Díaz, Migue Santa, Tony Ocasio, Alex Rodríguez, Juan Manuel Lebrón, Otilio Warrington, Millie Aviles, Ed Trucco, Julio Aldama Jr., Ricardo Bauleo, Eileen Navarro	Drama, mystery, musical		
El legado de Arturo Alfonso Schomburg	Jack Delano, Ramón H. Almodóvar	David Ortiz Angleró, Flor Piñero de Rivera, Ebenecer López Ruyol	Documentary	Documentary on the life and work of Arturo Alfonso Schomburg	
Luchando por la vida	José Artemio Torres	Rafi Torres	Documentary		
1985
La Gran Fiesta	Marcos Zurinaga	Daniel Lugo, Raúl Juliá, Cordelia González, Francisco Prado, José Féliz Gómez, Luis Prendes, Miguel Ángel Suárez, Laura Delano, Raúl Dávila, Carlos Cestero, Ivonne Coll, Julián Pastor, E.G. Marshall, Maruja Mas, David Ortiz Angleró	Drama, romance	Puerto Rico's official submission to the 1987 Oscars, in the Best Foreign Language Film category.	
Reflejo de un deseo	Ivonne María Soto	Lucy Boscana, Nilita Vientós Gastón, Mappy Cortés, Lucy Fabery			
Luis Muñoz Marín: un hombre, un pueblo, un propósito	Luis Molina Casanova	Ranfis González	Documentary	Documentary on the life and political legacy of Luis Muñoz Marín	
Al Hawaii	Ramón H. Almodóvar	Carmelo Rosario Natal, Justino Andújar Sáez, Rose García, Blase Camacho Souza, Salomón Feliciano Vega, Kathy Montalbo Guzmán, Rudy Méndez, Emilio Rodríguez	Documentary	Documentary on the Puerto Rican migration to Hawai’i in the early 1900s	
Raíces eternas	Noel Quiñones	José Ferrer, David Ortiz Angleró, Walter Rodríguez	Documentary		
La participación de la mujer en la historia de Puerto Rico	Cecilia Fernández		Documentary	Documentary on the role women have played in the history of Puerto Rico	
1986
Nicolás y los demás	Jacobo Morales	Daniel Lugo, Silvia Montanari, Jacobo Morales, Alba Raquel Barros, Dianne Fernández, Richard Morales, Luis Antonio Cosme, Rosa Grolau, Waleska Mariani, Roberto Fernández, William Gracia, Javier Breu, Francisco Berio, Carlos G. Concepción, Clarissa Morales	Drama		
Cimarrón	Luis Antonio Ramos Quiles		Short		
La batalla de Vieques	Zydnia Nazario		Documentary	Documentary of the US Navy's control and use of Vieques for military training and testing	
1987
Árboles sabios, mágicos árboles	Poli Marichal, Jack Delano		Animation, short documentary		
1988
Cuevas, cavernas y un parque	Luis Molina Casanova		Short documentary	Documentary on the Parque Nacional de las Cavernas del Río Camuy	
Allá viene el temporal	Luis Molina Casanova	Rey Francisco Quiñones	Documentary	Documentary on the historical impact of hurricanes in Puerto Rico	
1989
Lo que le pasó a Santiago	Jacobo Morales	Tommy Muñiz, Gladys Rodríguez, Johanna Rosaly, René Monclova, Jacobo Morales, Claribel Medina, Roberto Vigoreaux, Jaime Bello, Luz Minerva Rodríguez, Joaquín Belgodere, Pedro Muñiz, Aurora Valladares, José Orraca, Amós Rosario, Pedro Javier Muñiz, Manuel Méndez Ballester, Félix A. Muñiz, Andrés F. Quiñones, William Gracia, Wanda Betancourt, Blanca Silvia Eró, Vicente Juarbe, Natalia Huffman, Ángel Quintana, Miguel Dávila, Lorraine Lorenzana, Roberto Aponte, Josué Rosario, Tato Amadeo, Santo Jorge Grullart, Rafael Soto, William Ortiz Rivera, Miguel A. Velázquez Arce, David del Valle Reyes, Emérita López, Felipe Rivera, Ricardo Fernández, Raúl Rivera, Pedro Rivera Toledo, Miguel Cubano	Comedy, drama, romance	First and only Puerto Rican film to be nominated for an Academy Award for Best Foreign Language Film	
The Bell	Noel Quiñones	Cordelia González, María Esther Lasalle	Short		
San Juan Story	Kevin McCarey	Rosana de Soto, Jacobo Morales	Short	Produced by Noel Quiñones	
Yuyo	Mario Pabón	Alba Nydia Díaz, Elia Enid Cadilla, José Luis Marrero, Marian Pabón, Luz Minerva Rodríguez, Marcos Betancourt, Benjamín Morales, Teófilo Torres, Melvin Cedeño, Nelson Millán, Jaime Montilla, Santos Nazario, Horacio Olivo, Joffre Pérez, Delia Esther Quiñones, Orlando Rodríguez, Pedro Orlando Torres	Drama	Based on the novel Yuyo by Miguel Meléndez Muñoz	
Los espejos del silencio	Sonia Fritz	Myrna Báez	Documentary	Documentary on the life and work of Puerto Rican painter Myrna Báez	
Plena, canta y trabajo	Pedro A. Rivera, Susan Zeig		Documentary	Documentary on plena	

== 1990s ==
Title	Director	Cast	Genre	Notes	Ref.
1990
La Charca	Mario Pabón	Víctor Arrillaga, José Luis “Chavito” Marrero, Samuel Molina, Benjamín Morales, Santos Nazario, Adamari López, Pedro Orlando Torres, Elia Enid Cadilla, Teófilo Torres, Eugenio Monclova, Carlos Miranda, Melvin Cedeño, Ángel E. Domenech, Jaime Figueroa, Miguel Ángel Lugo, Jaime Montilla, Rafael Torres, Piero Áviles, Sharon Riley	Drama	Based on the novel “La Charca” by Manuel Zeno Gandía	
A flor de piel	Marcos Zurinaga	Cordelia González, Elia Enid Cadilla, Claribel Medina, René Monclova, Tony Chiroldes, Gladys Aguayo, Pablo Alarcón	Drama		
Cuentos de Abelardo	Luis Molina Casanova	José Luis “Chavito” Marrero, Jacobo Morales, Gladys Rodríguez, Orlando Rodríguez, Juan Ortiz Jiménez, Gilda Galán, Luz Minerva González, José Miguel Agrelot, Sunshine Logroño, Jaime Ruiz Capataz, Gerardo Ortiz, Josenia Droz, José Caro, Andrés F. Quiñones, Rey Francisco Quiñones, Víctor Arrillaga, Jesús Estrada, Delia Esther Quiñones, Noelia Crespo, Sacrovir Rivera, Julio Ramos, Jorge Castro, Fernando Bermúdez, Rosabel Otón, Armando Pardo, Melvin Cedeño	Drama	Adaptation of three short stories by Puerto Rican writer Abelardo Díaz Alfaro (“Don Procopio”, “Peyo Mercé enseña inglés”, and “Bagazo”)	
Chona, la puerca asesina	Luis Molina Casanova	Antonia Pantojas, Jaime Bello, José Miguel Agrelot, Osvaldo Ríos, Marian Pabón, Tommy Muñiz, Carmen Nydia Velázquez, Cristina Soler, Gilberto Santa Rosa, Carlitos Colón, Sunshine Logroño, Wilson Torres, Nena Rivera, Pablo Alarcón, Denissa, Dean Zayas, Pedro Guzmán	Horror, comedy		
Dilema 1: Burundanga Boricua	Poli Marichal	Awilda Sterling	Animation, short documentary		
Visa para un sueño	Sonia Fritz		Short documentary	Documentary on the immigration of illiterate Dominican laborers during the late 1980s to 1990, focusing on the plight of Dominican women in Puerto Rico	
1991
Cauce sin río	Mario Pabón	Samuel Molina, Alba Raquel Barros, Alba Nydia Díaz, Víctor Arrillaga, Miguel Ángel Lugo, José Luis “Chavito” Marrero, Gennie Montalvo, Jaime Montilla, Santos Nazario, Horacio Olivo, Marian Pabó, Delia Esther Quiñones, Jorge Luis Ramos, Luz Minerva González, Orlando Rodríguez, Mercedes Sicario, Cristina Soler, Teófilo Torres, Rafael Torres, Frankie Esquilín, Jaime Figueroa, Juana Lugo, Daniel Martínez, Eugenio Monclova, Jesús Manuel Otero, Juan Pablo Ortiz, Heysha Rivera, Gustavo E. Rodríguez, Ismanuel Soto, Su-Jan Sang, Francisco Texidor	Drama	Adaptation of the novel Cauce sin río by Puerto Rican writer Enrique Laguerre	
Albizu Vive	Luis Molina Casanova	David Ortiz Angleró	Documentary	Documentary on the life and political legacy of Pedro Albizu Campos	
Puerto Rico: arte e identidad	Sonia Fritz	Myrna Báez, Antonio Torres Martinó	Documentary		
1992
Adombe: la presencia africana en Puerto Rico	Edwin Reyes	Antonio Torres Martinó, Brunilda García, René Monclova, Walter Rodríguez, José Luis Vega	Documentary	Documentary on the history and influences of Africans in Puerto Rican society with dramatizations of scenes from the life of poet Luis Palés Matos	
Rafael Hernández, jibarito del mundo	Edwin Reyes	David Ortiz Angleró, Celia Cruz, Ruth Fernández, Chucho Navarro, Margarita Romero, Marco Antonio Muñiz, Ismael Serrano, Antolina Vélez, Teresa “Chacha” Roque, Victoria Hernández, Amparo Montes, Juan Bruno Tarraza, Joan Manuel Serrat, María Pérez, Alejandro Santiago, Edylaine Morales, Juan F. Revilla, Martín Nieves, Luz Eneida Núñez, Noelia Quintero, Luis Guzmán, Zahmari Hernández, Justino Díaz	Documentary	Documentary on the life and career of Rafael Hernández Marín	
La recién nacida sangre	Juan Carlos García	Teófilo Torres, Awilda Sterling, Jacqueline O’Neill, Jaime Ramírez, David Rodríguez	Short film, drama	Film adaptation of the 1968 story La recién nacida sangre by Luis Rafael Sánchez	
Cocolos y Rockeros	Ana María García	Gilberto Santa Rosa, Eddie Palmieri, El Gran Combo, Cheo Feliciano	Documentary	Documentary examining the musical tastes of Puerto Rican youth	
1993
La guagua aérea	Luis Molina Casanova	Adamari López, Marian Pabón, Gladys Rodríguez, Alba Nydia Díaz, Sunshine Logroño, Cristina Soler, Héctor Travieso, Norma Candal, Teófilo Torres, Axel Anderson, Chavito Marrero, Idalia Pérez Garay, Esther Mari	Comedy	Based on the 1984 essay “La guagua aérea” published in El Nuevo Día by Luis Rafael Sánchez	
Un día cualquiera	Ángel F. Rivera			This film originally did not make it past the editing process in 1953 and was released four decades later in 1993. Part of the DIVEDCO film catalogue.	
Luisa Capetillo: pasión de justicia	Sonia Fritz	Ideé Charriez, Ángel Vázquez, Lilliana Ramos, Ineabelle Colón, Orlando Rodríguez, Lourdes Morán, Tony Chiroldes, Magali Carrasquillo, David Rodríguez, Glenn Fogley, Victoria Espinosa	Historical documentary	Documentary on the life and work of Luisa Capetillo	
1994
Linda Sara	Jacobo Morales	Chayanne, Dayanara Torres, Daniel Lugo, Johanna Rosaly, Adamari López, Jacobo Morales, Jorge Luis Ramos, Joan Amick, Benjamín Morales, Myrna Casas, Antonio Martorell, Ineabelle Colón, Raúl Dávila, Jorge Javier Melani, Yvette Rodríguez, Horacio Olivo, Iris Martínez	Comedy, romance, drama		
Brincando el Charco: Portrait of a Puerto Rican	Frances Negrón-Muntaner	Frances Negrón-Muntaner, Natalia Lazarus, Zulma González, Toni Cade Bambara	Drama		
Mamagüela	Viveca Vázquez	Patricia Dávila, Teresa Hernández, Alejandra Martorell, Sandra Ruiz, Awilda Sterling	Documentary, experimental		
1995
Palés: reseña de una vida útil	Edwin Reyes	Julio Torresoto, René Monclova, José Luis “Chavito” Marrero	Drama, documentary, short	Dramatization of the life of Luis Palés Matos	
1996
Al compas de un sentimiento					
Una pasión llamada Clara Lair	Ivonne Belén	Yeyita Cervoni, Felisa Rincón de Gautier, David Ortiz Angleró	Documentary	Life of Clara Lair	
Callando amores	José Orraca	Esther Marí, Roberto Ramos-Perea, Ángela Marí, José Brocco	Drama	Film adaptation of the 1994 play Callando amores by Roberto Ramos-Perea	
Tufiño: una vida para el arte, un arte para la vida	Edwin Reyes	Rafael Tufiño	Documentary, short	Documentary on the life and work of Puerto Rican painter Rafael Tufiño	
El poder de Shakti	Joseph Lando	Joseph Lando, Gladys Rodríguez, Benjamín Morales, Alba Nydia Díaz, Miguel Ángel Suárez, Efraín Rosa, Juan Luis Acevedo, Marcos Betancourt, Pedro Cabrera, Luis Enrique Romero, Marieli Durán, Ángel Vázquez	Action, adventure, fantasy		
Milagro en Yauco	Abdiel Colberg	Raúl Dávila, Gladys Rodríguez, Velda González, Tony Croatto, Francisco Zamora, Michelangelo Mejía	Drama		
¡Palante, Siempre Palante! The Young Lords	Iris Morales		Documentary	Documentary about the Young Lords	
1997
La noche que se apareció Toño Bicicleta	Vicente Castro	Braulio Castillo Jr., Alba Nydia Díaz, Cordelia González, Joaquín Jarque, Adamari López, Jorge Luis Ramos, José Brocco, Magdaly Cruz	Drama		
El ruiseñor y la rosa	Alfredo E. Rivas	Henri Rivas, Rafael Vázquez	Drama, romance		
Los Santos Reyes Magos	Sonia Fritz	Teresa Hernández	Documentary	Documentary on the Three Holy King's day procession of Juana Díaz, Puerto Rico on January 5. This documentary also captures the artisanship of Domingo Orta and the Promesa de Reyes (Holy King's promise) in families from Las Marías, Patillas, Aguadilla, Vieques, and Dorado.	
Retrato de una travesía: Jack Delano	José “Jochi” Melero	José Luis “Chavito” Marrero	Documentary	Documentary on the life and art of Jack Delano	
1998
The Absolution					
Angelito mío					
Héroes de Otra Patria	Iván Dariel Ortiz	Jimmy Navarro, Jorge Castillo	War, drama		
Asesinato en primer grado	Vicente Castro	Johanna Rosaly, Osvaldo Ríos, Ernesto Concepción padre, José Brocco, Yahayra Pérez, Lourdes Chacón			
El callejón de los cuernos	Vicente Castro	Míriam Colón, José Brocco, Manolo Castro, Alba Raquel Barros, Noelia Crespo, Blanca Lissette Cruz, Ernesto Concepción Moreau, Jorge Luis Ramos, Ernesto González, Blanca Fernández, Néstor Rodulfo, Sharon Riley	Crime, drama		
En el ojo del huracán	Vicente Castro	Adamari López, Víctor Manuelle, Suzette Bacó, Jorge Luis Ramos, Néstor Rodulfo, Blanca Lissette Cruz, Luisa de los Ríos, Jerry Segarra	Drama		
Flores de la noche	Gilo Rivera	Ofelia D’Acosta, Alba Nydia Díaz, Nydia Caro, Santos Nazario, Marian Pabón, Sara Jarque	Drama		
Cuentos para despertar	Luis Molina Casanova	David Ortiz Angleró, Braulio Castillo Jr., Teófilo Torres, René Monclova, José Luis “Chavito” Marrero, Jacobo Morales, Maricarmen Avilés, Gladys Aguayo, Gerardo Ortiz, Delia Esther Quiñones, Benjamín Morales, Esther Marí, Rey Francisco Quiñones, Mercedes Sicario, Ineabelle Colón, Armando Pardo, Carmen Gutiérrez, Humberto González, Mario Previdi, Luz Minerva González, Eugenio Monclova	Drama	Adaptation of three short stories by Puerto Rican writer Abelardo Díaz Alfaro (“El josco”, “Santa Cló va a la cuchilla”, and “Don Fruto Torres”)	
Miles: la otra historia del 98	Roberto Ramos-Perea	Jorge Castro, Ángela Marí, Jimmy Navarro, Gerardo Ortiz, José Félix Gómez, Marcos Betancourt, Eliezer Ortiz, José Brocco	Historical drama	Dramatization of the Puerto Rico campaign	
Impacto mortal	Raúl García	Ricardo Vázquez, Rolando D’Lugo, Coraly Santaliz, Laura Hernández, Cristóbal Sánchez, Frenchie Guadalupe, Edward Allende, Miguel Pabón, Míriam Ramírez	Action, drama		
Mutantes	Juan Carlos García, Daniel Nina	Georgina Borri, Yamil Collazo, Marco Antonio Abad, Adrián García, Awilda Sterling	Short film, drama	Adaptation of Franz Kafka's The Metamorphosis to a Puerto Rican setting, where as the character in the book transforms into an insect, the character in this movie transforms into a coquí	
The Face at the Window	Radamés Sánchez	Ideé Charriez, Axel Anderson, Eugenio Monclova, Ivonne Petrovich, Jaime Hamilton, Héctor Ocasio, Mariyeli Guseman, Sylvia Santiago, Gil Raldiris, Olga Nolla, Edgar Quiñones, Luna Coppola	Horror, thriller		
1999
Paging Emma					
Vieques: métafora de Puerto Rico	Ivonne María Soto	Gilberto Concepción Suárez	Documentary		
Coralito y sus dos maridos	Vicente Castro	Joyce Giraud, Jimmy Navarro, Jorge Luis Ramos, Luz Odilia Font, Carmen Nydia Velázquez	Comedy		
Oso Blanco	Vicente Castro	Jorge Luis Ramos, Jorge Castro, Herbert Cruz, Yahayra Pérez, Albert Rodríguez	Drama		
Amores como todos los demás	Gilo Rivera	Braulio Castillo Jr., Gladys Rodríguez, Blanca Lissette Cruz, Noelia Crespo	Drama		
En el día menos pensado	Vicente Castro	Yinoelle Colón, Elí Cay, Cristina Soler, Giselle Blondet, Junior Álvarez, Jorge Luis Ramos, Georgina Borri, Luisa Justiniano, Omar Ledee, Ricardo Hinoa, Agustín Rosario, Carlos Esteban Fonseca, Luis Hernández, Franchesca Mattei, Ricardo Rincón, Charlie Ramos, Gabriel Padilla, Gerónimo Pérez Quesada	Drama		
Leyendas de Puerto Rico	Luis Molina Casanova	Gladys Aguayo, Axel Anderson, Ranfis González, José Luis “Chavito” Marrero, Eugenio Monclova, Gerardo Ortiz, Julio Ramos, Ángel F. Rivera, Helbert Massari, Herminio Cabrera, Laura Molina Previdi, Anamín Santiago, Roy Sánchez-Vahamonde, Teófilo Torres, Francisco Zamora, Evelyn Rosario, Verónica Rolán Moll	Drama	Adaptation of three stories by Puerto Rican writer Cayetano Coll y Toste (“El Santo Cristo de la Salud”, “El Espíritu del Carretero”, and “La Garita del Diablo”)	
Punto final: de como Tito Mangual aprendió a bregar	Edwin Reyes	Pablo Tufiño, Jaime Acosta, Awilda Carbia, Miguel Ángel Suárez, Jonathan Cardenales, Ranfis González, Ernesto Concepción Moreau, Sunshine Logroño, René Monclova, Rosabel Otón, Danny Rivera, Teófilo Torres, Rafi Torres	Drama		
Los hijos de nadie	Pedro Juan Figueroa	Osvaldo Ríos, Jimmy Navarro, Michelle Deliz, Gustavo Rodríguez, Junior Álvarez, Luis Enrique Romero, Pedro Juan Texidor, Adrián García, Jorge Dieppa, Magdaly Cruz, Alexandra Rosa, Alfred Herger Jr.	Drama		

== 2000s ==
Title	Director	Cast	Genre	Notes	Ref.
2000
Los Díaz de Doris	Abdiel Colberg	Braulio Castillo Jr., Cordelia González, Velda González, Alba Raquel Barros, Yezmín Luzzed, Raúl Dávila, Kidany Lugo, Teófilo Torres, Rey Pascual, Diana Quijano, Santos Nazario, Jorge Dieppa, Elí Cay, Teresa Hernández, Humberto González, Ricardo Álvarez, Flor Joglar de Gracia, Abdiel González, Néstor Rodulfo, Rosabel del Valle, Luis Freddie Vázquez, Marieli Durán, Alejandro Santiago, Juanma Fernández París	Drama		
Flight of Fancy	Noel Quiñones	Dean Cain, Talisa Soto, Miguel Sandoval, Kristian de la Osa, Carmen Moreno, Juan Piedrahita	Feature		
Cundeamor	Miguel Ángel Suárez	Amneris Morales, Miguel Ángel Suárez, Belange Rodríguez, Jimmy Navarro, Alba Raquel Barros, Damarys Colón	Drama		
Que candela de pueblito	Gilo Rivera	Luz María Rondón, Kidany Lugo, William Gracia, Esther María, Sara Jarque, Marcos Betancourt, Roxanna Badillo, Iliana García, Herman O’Neill, Ulises Rodríguez			
¿Quién le tiene miedo al Cuco?	Vicente Castro	René Monclova, Luisa de los Ríos, Alba Raquel Barros, Jaime Bello, Elí Cay, Edwin Alicea, Blanca Lissette Cruz, Luis Gonzaga, Herman O’Neill, Jerry Segarra, Olga Sesto, Yahayra Pérez	Drama, comedy		
La primera finalista	Vicente Castro	Joyce Giraud, Gilda Haddock, Franchesca Mattei, Yahayra Pérez, Bárbara Serrano	Drama		
Culebra USA	Vicente Castro	Sully Díaz, Junior Álvarez, Jorge Luis Ramos	Drama		
Zafra: la historia de la industria azucarera en Puerto Rico	Luis Molina Casanova	Jesse Calderón	Documentary	Documentary on the history of the sugarcane industry in Puerto Rico	
El 7mo ángel	Raúl García	Ernesto Concepción Moreau, Jorge Castro, Magdaly Cruz, Suzette Bacó, Pedro Juan Figueroa, Luis Enrique Romero, Luz María Rondón, Edgar Cuevas, Blanca Lisette Cruz, José Brocco, Jessica Delgado, Elí Cay, Abdiel González, Roberto Rodríguez, Edwin Ocario, Ricardo Hinoa, Gerardo Ortiz	Horror, mystery, action		
¿Y si Cristóbal despierta?	Sonia Valentín	Angélica Aragón, Alba Nydia Díaz, Sonia Valentín, Braulio Castillo Jr., Norma Candal, Esther Marí, Yvette Rodríguez	Drama		
El beso que me diste...	Sonia Fritz	Maricarmen Avilés, Jimmy Navarro, Humberto González, René Monclova, Carola García, Ineabelle Colón, Joseph Alicea, Lourdes Morán	Drama, thriller, romance	Film adaptation of the 1997 book Porque el beso que me diste no lo olvidaré jamás by Stella Soto	
2001
12 Horas	Raúl Marchand Sánchez	Marcos Betancourt, Wanda Rovira, Michelle Deliz, Yadira Nazario, Cielomar Cuevas, Charlie Massó	Drama, musical		
Amores que matan	Vicente Castro	Raúl Carbonell Jr., Sully Díaz, Jorge Luis Ramos, Luz Odilia Font, Ofelia D’Acosta, Sara Jarque, Gilberto Valenzuela, Néstor Rodulfo, Ana Belén Caballero, Alexandra Malagón	Drama	Fictional story inspired in the 2000 Utuado Massacre	
Locos de amor	Vicente Castro	Jazmín Caratini, Óscar Guerrero, Tobi-Wan Rodríguez, Yezmín Luzzed, Néstor Rodulfo, Jorge Luis Ramos, Jonathan Otero, Ricardo Hinoa, Yaremis Félix, Héctor Arroyo, Juan Pablo Díaz, Yahayra Pérez, Lymarie Pérez, Ángel Vázquez, Cristina Soler, Rafael Cruzado, Ángel Marí	Romance, drama, action		
El tesoro del Yunque	Vicente Castro	Ofelia D’Acosta, Elí Cay, Óscar Guerrero, Jazmín Caratini, Claudia Ramos, Rafael Graulau, Jorge Luis Ramos, Pedro Orlando Torres, Julio Axel Landrón, Xiomara Rodrïguez, Pedro Juan Texidor, José Luis Marrero	Adventure, family		
Cuéntame tu pena	Vicente Castro	Sully Díaz, Sunshine Logroño, Carlos Esteban Fonseca, Jorge Luis Ramos, Axel Cintrón, Anamín Santiago, Jorge Luis Pascual, Jorge Castro, Blanca Lisette Cruz	Drama, mystery		
Cuando las mujeres quieren a los hombres	Vicente Castro	Sara Jarque, Olga Sesto, Yamaris Latorre, Marian Pabón, Luisa de los Ríos, Jorge Luis Ramos, Teresa Hernández, Carola García, Carlos Fontané, Jimmy Navarro, Jerry Segarra, Dean Zayas	Drama		
Padre Astro	Miguel Ángel Suárez	Braulio Castillo Jr., Amneris Morales, Anthony Cotto, Miguel Ángel Suárez, María Lola, Alba Raquel Barros, Carlos Esteban Fonseca	Drama		
Entre los dioses del desprecio	Alfredo E. Rivas	Axel Anderson, Pedro Armendáriz Jr., Fabián Mazzei, Esther Goris, Paula Colombini, Lia Chapman, Alba Raquel Barros			
Raíces	Paloma Suau	The Cepeda family, Marc Anthony, José Feliciano, La India, Danny Rivera, Lucecita Benítez, Ángel “Cucco” Peña, Michael Stuart, Ruth Fernández, Choco Orta	Documentary, music	Documentary on the history of bomba and plena, two forms of traditional Puerto Rican music	
La cajita vacía	Luis Molina Casanova	José Félix Gómez, Rosabel Otón, Armando Pardo, Joseph Alicea, Letty Contreras, Ángel F. Rivera, Mario González	Drama, family	Adaptation of the short story La cajita vacía by Abelardo Díaz Alfaro	
Plaza vacante	Sonia Valentín	Alba Nydia Díaz, Osvaldo Ríos, Linette Torres, Mercedes Sicario, Jorge Dieppa, Ivonne Caro Caro, Yezmín Luzzed, Sonia Valentín, Rey Pascual, Néstor Rodulfo, Olga Díaz	Drama, thriller		
Ilusión	David Aponte	Vanessa Tartak, Kidany Lugo, Tobi-Wan Rodríguez, Joann Polanco, Marisol Rivera, Carlos Joel Flores, Xiona Rocío Nieves	Romance, comedy, adventure		
Marina	Jaume Domenech	Julián Gil, Flavia Manes Rossi, Juan Carlos Morales	Romance		
2002
Sudor Amargo	Sonia Valentín	Alba Nydia Díaz, Yamaris Latorre, Yvonne Caro, Esther Marí y Luisa Justiciano	Drama		
La fiebre	Vicente Castro	Daniela Droz, Luis Gonzaga, Juan Pablo Díaz, Yinoelle Colón, Arturo Gaskins, Ricardo Hinoa, Magali Carrasquillo, Jorge Luis Ramos, Carlos Esteban Fonseca, Óscar Guerrero, Cristina Sesto, Ángel Viera	Drama, action		
La noche que tumbaron al campeón	Vicente Castro	Adamari López, Jorge Castro, Jorge Luis Ramos, Darysabel Isales, Carlos Esteban Fonseca, Elí Cay, Olga Sesto, Carla Alvarado, Ángel Viera, Javier de Jesús, Arlene Robles, Noland Otero, Humberto González, Carlos Vega, Gil René, Xiomara Rodríguez, Yamaris Latorre	Drama		
Cuando lo pequeño se hace grande	Mariem Pérez Riera	Rubén Berríos, Silverio Pérez, Luis Gutiérrez	Short documentary	Documentary on the death of David Sanes and the subsequent protests that occurred as a response in Vieques, Puerto Rico	
Las caras lindas de Tite Curet	Sonia Fritz	Tite Curet Alonso	Documentary	Documentary on the life and work of Puerto Rican composer Tite Curet Alonso. This film includes Tite Curet Alonso's last interview before his death.	
1937: Masacre de Ponce	Jaime Hamilton	David Ortíz Angleró, Allan Sagué Álvarez	Documentary	Documentary on the Ponce massacre	
Más allá del límite	Eric Delgado	Osvaldo Ríos, Alfred D. Herger Jr., Elia Enid Cadilla, Rey Pascual, Julián Gil, Brenda Liz López, Antonio Sánchez, Melvin Cedeño, Geraldine Fernández, José Félix Gómez, Pedro Telémaco, Miguel Ángel Suárez, Carlos Ferrer, Astrid Gruber, Giuliano Ríos Dominicci	Drama		
Kuarentayseis	Nemesio Gil	Gilda Haddock, Jaime Bello, Ofelia D’Acosta, Ramón Saldaña, Luz María Rondón, Jonathan Dwayne, Esther Marí, Ángel F. Rivera, Luis Freddie Vázquez, Kevin Aponte, Magdaly Cruz, Nashali Enchautegui, Marisol Rivera	Comedy		
Julia, toda en mí	Ivonne Belén	Cordelia González, Teófilo Torres, Gretchen Colón, Virianai Rodríguez, María del Mar Cruz, Jacobo Morales, Míriam Colón, Benicio del Toro, Daisy Granados, Jorge Perugorría, Angélica Aragón, Antonio Martorell, Iris Martínez, Luis Rafael Sánchez, Ángel Darío Carrero, Lolita Villanúa, Mercedes López Baralt, Mayra Santos-Febres, Nydia Caro, Danny Rivera, María Consuelo Sáez Burgos	Documentary	Documentary on the life and work of poet Julia de Burgos	
2003
Archipiélago					
Bala perdida	Raúl Marchand Sánchez	Choco Orta, Elí Cay, Modesto Lacén, Idalia Pérez Garay, Marisol Calero, Ivan Camilo, Ismael Cruz Córdoba, José Félix Gómez, Camila Monclova, Pedro Villalón, Rey Pascual, Amneris Morales, Néstor Rodulfo, Sharon Riley	Drama		
Latin Comedy: Una Comedia de Derecha para un Publico de Izquierda	Janet Alvarez Gonzalez	Janet Alvarez Gonzalez, Pucho Fernández, Samuel Alvarez Gonzalez, Eddy Fuentes, Antonio Morales, Myrna de Casenave, Lorel Crespo,	Comedy		
Bazooka: Las Batallas de Wilfredo Gómez				Documentary about boxer Wilfredo Gómez	
Candida					
En cuarentena	Vicente Castro	Claribel Medina, Karla Monroig, Jimmy Navarro, Luz Odilia Font, Pedro Orlando Torres, Gilda Haddock, Yvonne Caro Caro, Doel Alicea, Néstor Rodulfo, Luisa Justiniano, Richard Rondón, Alice Guy, Jorge Luis Ramos	Comedy, drama		
Abierto 24 Horas	Vicente Castro	René Monclova, Linette Torres, Anamín Santiago, Sara Pastor, Junior Álvarez, Edward Marshall	Drama		
Promesa de Reyes	Vicente Castro	Eddie D, Gilda Haddock, Luz Odilia Font, Mario Roche, Néstor Rodulfo, Virginia Romero, Hilda Pizarro, José Caro, Rocío del Mar Bernard, Carlos R. Borrias, Jezel Velázquez, Yoksan Solís, Omar Ledee, Carlos Ortega, Pedro Orlando Torres	Drama		
La otra mafia	Vicente Castro	Jerry Segarra, Jaime Bello, Jorge Luis Ramos, Modesto Lacén, Jimmy Navarro, Jazmin Caratini, Luisa de los Ríos, Ángela Marí, Luisa Justiniano, Juan Carlos Morales	Drama, crime		
Dile que la quiero	Vicente Castro	Marilyn Pupo, Blanca Lisette Cruz, Ricardo Ramos, Richard Rondón, Christie Miró, Claudia Ramos, Andy Montañez, Jazmin Caratini	Romance, drama		
El cuento inolvidable de la abuela	Miguel Ángel Suárez	Luz María Rondón, Amneris Morales, Miguel Ángel Suárez, Santos Nazario, Cristina Soler, Raúl Carbonell Jr., Teófilo Torres, Eileen Navarro, David Ortiz Angleró, Anthony Cotto, Hannia Rodríguez, Anelisse Rivera, Zoritza O’Neill, Vanessa Vachier, Roberto Rodríguez	Drama, family		
La gringa	Luis Caballero	Sully Díaz, Teófilo Torres, Myrna Casas, Luis Raúl, Lydia Echevarría, Juan Carlos Morales, José L. Ramos Escobar, Marcos Garay, Elsie Moreau, Néstor Rodulfo, Wilma Ballet, Anabel López, Marieli Durán, Orlando Rodríguez, Iliana García, Rosabel Otón	Drama, comedy		
Celestino y el Vampiro	Radamés Sánchez	Axel Anderson, Jaime Hamilton, René Monclova, Eugenio Monclova, Amneris Morales, Yvonne Caro Caro	Comedy, horror		
Kamaleón	Kim Kravitz	Ricardo Álvarez, Ramón Saldaña, Luis Freddie Vázquez, José Brocco, Michelle Díaz, Karla Monroig, Katiria Soto, Modesto Lacén, Luis Gonzaga, Raúl Carbonell Jr.	Action, drama		
Cuatro Vidas	Elia Enid Cadilla	Naldo, José Luis Muñoz, Claribel Rivera, Dora Silva, Janet Vallejo	Drama		
Santa Cristal	José R. Román	Modesto Lacén, Sara Jarque, Sunshine Logroño, Adrián García, Suzette Bacó, Raquel Montero, Joffre Pérez, Iván Camilo, Juan Carlos Díaz, William Piedra, Blanca Lissette Cruz, Gretchen Colón, Luis Freddie Vázquez, Marcos Rodríguez	Comedy		
2004
Aljuriya	Freddie Marrero Alfonso, Gabriel Coss		Documentary		
El Anillo	Coraly Santaliz	Gerardo Ortiz, Annette Santaliz, José Jorge Medina	Short film, comedy		
Dios los cría 2	Jacobo Morales	Jacobo Morales, Jaime Bello, Cristina Soler, José Miguel Agrelot, Miguel Ángel Suárez, Norma Candal, Benjamín Morales, José Luis Marrero, Elia Enid Cadilla, Johanna Rosaly, Ofelia D’Acosta, Teófilo Torres, Carola García, Jimmy Navarro, Ubi Catasús, Yamaris Latorres, Suzette Bacó, Jorge Castro, Chucho Avellanet, Tony Croatto, Rolando D’Lugo, Julio Torresoto, Nicole Betancourt, Lolita Villanúa, Laura Rey, Carlos Esteban Fonseca, José Orraca, Emilio Rodríguez, José Luis Muñoz, Ariel Orama López	Comedy, drama		
Revolución en el infierno	Gilo Rivera	Ernesto Concepción Moreau, Cordelia González, Braulio Castillo Jr., Miguel Ángel Suárez, Eugenio Monclova, Julio Ramos, Ángela Marí, Maribel Quiñones, Raúl Carbonell Jr., Jaime Bello, Francisco Capó, Elsie Moreau, Norman Santiago, Ángel Vázquez, Brian Tester, Ulises Rodríguez, Willie Denton, Miguel Ramos, Herman O’Neill, José Brocco	Historical drama	Retelling of the Ponce Massacre through the point of view of one of the victims, Ulpiano Perea	
Desamores	Edmundo H. Rodríguez	Teófilo Torres, Yezmín Luzzed, Efraín López Neris, Jacqueline Duprey, Braulio Castillo Jr., Jonathan Dwayne, Modesto Lacén, Myrna Casas, Gerardo Ortiz, Raúl Carbonell Jr., Axel Anderson, René Monclova	Drama, crime		
Amores extremos	Vicente Castro	Nuria Fergó, Giovanni Haddock, Jorge Luis Ramos, Elia Enid Cadilla, Myrna Casas, José L. Gutiérrez	Drama		
Historia de un trompetista	Vicente Castro	Juan Carlos Frontado, Sully Díaz, Jerry Segarra, Jorge Luis Ramos, Maribel Quiñones, Manolo Castro, Joaquín Jarque, Doel Alicea, Aniel Rosario, Juan Carlos Betancourt, Alexandra Malagón, Gabriel Rodríguez	Drama		
Santa Clós es Boricua	Vicente Castro	Luis A. Rivera, Gilda Haddock, Adrián García, Jorge Luis Ramos, Jazmin Caratini, Georgina Borri, Luisa Justiniano, Ricardo Álvarez, Jonathan Cardenales, Celinés, Pedro Guzmán, Abraham Marti, Gloria María Negrón, Dean Zayas, Alba Reyes	Comedy	Adaptation of A Christmas Carol to a Puerto Rican setting	
Barrio Obrero	Vicente Castro	Gladys Rodríguez, Wanda Sais, Juan Carlos Betancourt, Luisa Justiniano, Gilda Haddock, Jonathan Cardenales, Luisito Vigoreaux, Jessica Pizarro, Josean Rosario, Doel García, Mariana Quiles, Virginia Romero	Romance, drama		
El pan nuestro	Vicente Castro	Marilyn Pupo, Clarissa Chapuseaux, Luz Odilia Font, Doel García, Luis Gonzaga, Anthony Vargas, Juan Carlos Betancourt, Jessica Pizarro, Tyron Pérez, Noelia	Drama		
Las Combatientes	Sonia Valentín	Alba Nydia Díaz, Cordelia González, Flor Núñez, Sonia Valentín, Roxanna Badillo, Guiseppe Vázquez, Linette Coll, Junior Álvarez, Pedro Orlando Torres, Walter Rodríguez	Drama		
Una historia común	Sonia Fritz	Marisol Calero, Jaime Bello, René Monclova, Israel Lugo, Edna de Jesús, Marisa Varela, Humberto González	Drama		
Barrios	Arí Maniel Cruz, Julio César Torres	Raúl Carbonell Jr., Kisha Tikina Burgos, Teófilo Torres, Aris Mejías, Luz María Rondón, Adrián García, Juan Mnauel Lebrón, Johanna Rosaly, Miguel Ángel Suárez, Jaime Bello, Lydia Echevarría, Andy Montañez, Ismael Rivera, Néstor Galán, Norman Santiago, Joffre Pérez, Laura Cabrera, Daniel Torres, Carlos Ruiz, Karina Vélez, Modesto Lacén, Idenisse Salamán, John García, Otilio Warrington, Judith Pizarro, Janibeth Santiago, Elliott Castro, Yussef Soto	Drama		
Sabo	Alex Matos	Ángel Vázquez, Néstor Rodulfo, Carlos Vega, Aníbal Lleras, Adrián Ramos, Cristina Gordillo, Naín Nun, Rolando Jiménez, Osvaldo Friger, Peter Hance, Eugenio Monclova	Crime		
2005
Cayo	Vicente Juarbe	Carlos Esteban Fonseca, Kamar de los Reyes, José Félix Gómez, Iván Camilo, Roselyn Sánchez, Idalia Pérez Garay	Drama		
Taínos	Benjamín López	Sharon Nytaína, Danny Fraticelli, Josué Reyes, Christie Miró, Ferrán Galindo, Karina Guerra, Axel Anderson	Adventure, action, drama		
El sueño del regreso	Luis Molina Casanova	Gladys Aguayo, Awilda Carbia, Magali Carrasquillo, Luisa de los Ríos, Jonathan Dwayne, José Félix Gómez, Sara Jarque, Katy Franco, Yezmín Luzzed, Johnny Ray, Gladys Rodríguez, Teófilo Torres, Raymond Arrieta, Samuel Negrón, Provi Seín, Gilberto Santa Rosa, Carlos Marchand, Christian Santiago, Iris Martínez, Velda González, Carlos Merced, Axel Cintrón, Ángel F. Rivera, Ramón Saldaña, Víctor Santos, Tavin Pumarejo, Juan Manuel Lebrón, Víctor Alicea, Carmen Nydia Velázquez, Letty Contreras, Helbert Massari, Salvador Rosa, Mariano Mier, Miguelón Rodríguez, Sonybel Zeno, Tanishka Pardo, Gerardo Ortiz, Luis Torres Mercado	Drama, comedy		
Pa’ eso estamos	Jacobo Morales	Juan Manuel Lebrón, Norma Candal, Otilio Warrington, William Gracia, Iliana García, Humberto González, Adrián García	Drama, comedy		
El desvío...la escena del crimen	Vicente Castro	Alba Raquel Barros, Gerardo Rodríguez, Wilfredo Corona, Walter Rodríguez, Amneris Morales, Raúl Carbonell Jr., Jerry Segarra, Juan Carlos Betancourt, Jorge Luna, Joshua Rosado, Keisha Cascio, Joan Michelle Hernández, Iván Armador, Dwight Pastrana, Nicolás González	Drama		
Quiéreme mucho	Vicente Castro	Axel Anderson, Sonia Noemí González, Carlos Esteban Fonseca, Luisa de los Ríos, Jerry Segarra, Jorge Luis Ramos, Joemy Blanco, Xavier Torres, Iris Martínez, Linette Torres, Rafael Fuentes, Joshua Rosado, Joseline Vélez	Drama		
El mar no perdona	Vicente Castro	Alexandra Malagón, César Paredes, Maribel Quiñones, Miguel Ramos, Xiomara Rodríguez, Néstor Rodulfo, Doel Alicea, Virginia Romero, Diane Sanlatte, Gustavo Gil, Juan Luis Sánchez, Hilda Pizarro, Jesse Calderón, Walter Rodríguez, Martita Martínez, Eliezer Alejandro	Drama	Fictional portrayal of Dominican immigration to Puerto Rico and their struggles to find a better future	
La pipa es lo de menos	Vicente Castro	Jerry Segarra, Carlos Merced, Juan Carlos Betancourt, Ángela Marí, Blanca Lissette Cruz, Deborah Nieves, María Bertólez, Francisco Hurtado, Bryan García, Zorangelises Serrano, Cheka, Stephanie Vilella, Franchellys Andino, Emmanuel Colón, Rafael González, Randy Calzada, Ramón Santos	Drama, family		
¡Qué buena vida!	Vicente Castro	Gladys Rodríguez, Linette Torres, Juan Manuel Lebrón, Walter Rodríguez, Jerry Segarra, Tita Guerrero, Alfonsina Molinari, Jorge Luis Ramos, Ricardo Álvarez, Esther Marí	Drama		
Parece que fue ayer	Sonia Valentín	Jorge Castro, Chavito Marrero, Mercedes Sicario, Alba Nydia Díaz, Gerardo Ortiz, Magdaly Cruz, Sonia Valentín, Ángel Manuel, Cristina Soler, Herman O’Neill, Ernesto Concepción Moreau, Joaquín Jarque	Historical drama, romance		
El último caso del detective Prado	José Artemio Torres	Elín Ortiz, Lucy Fabery, Rafael José, Yezmín Luzzed, Eugenion Monclova, Maribel Quiñones, Antonia Pantojas	Action, drama, comedy, romance		
Mi Vida: La Película	David Impeluso	Wisin, Yandel, José Luis “Chavito” Marrero, Mercedes Sicario, Byron, Melitza Fuentes, Gabriel Cochran González, Javier Nieves	Drama, music	Dramatization of the life and career of reggaetón duo Wisin & Yandel	
Cuando el universo conspira	Elia Endi Cadilla	Cynthia Olavarría, Víctor Manuelle, Miguel Ángel Sánchez, Abdiel Cecilio, Luisa Justiniano, Elia Enid Cadilla, Sully Díaz, Francisco Rosa, Mercy Guzmán, Alberto González, Andrés Santiago	Romance, drama		
La escena	Guillermo Gómez Álvarez	Joe Valentín, Raúl Juliá, Tito Rentas, José Ibáñez	Documentary	Documentary on the history of punk in Puerto Rico	
2006
Casi Casi	Jaime Vallés, Tony Vallés	Marian Pabón, Mario Pabón, Irene Lucio, Fernando Castro Álvarez, Alexis Arce, Ricardo Arias, Marisa Gómez, Maite Cantó, Manuel Benítez, Albert Rodríguez, Tino García		Rated PG	
El Clown	Pedro Adorno, Emilio Rodriguez	Jaime Bello, Ernesto Concepción Jr. and Yaraní del Valle			
Ladrones y mentirosos	Ricardo Méndez Matta	Steven Bauer, Isidro Bobadilla, Elpidia Carrillo, José Heredia, Daniel Lugo, Lymari Nadal, Carlos Paniagua, Magda Rivera, Luz María Rondón, TNT	Drama	Rated R	
Vidas Paralelas	Vicente Castro	Sully Díaz, Jorge Luis Ramos, Alexandra Malegón, Jerry Segarra, Christie Miró, Juan Carlos Betancourt, Luisa Justiniano, Carlos Manuel Maldonado, Alexander Torres, Kevin Aponte, Israel Santiago, Karem Herrera, Georgina Borri	Drama, romance		
La última noche	Vicente Castro	Tito El Bambino, Christie Miró, Junior Álvarez, Juan Carlos Betancourt, Kidany Lugo, Jerry Segarra, Virginia Romero, Maribel Quiñones, Glory Montalvo, Naldo, Amalia Cruz	Drama, romance		
Después de la muerte	Roberto Ramos-Perea	Melissa Reyes, Naymed Calzada, Nelson Alvarado	Drama		
Entremedio	Andrés Ramírez	Óscar Guerrero, Jazmín Caratini, Modesto Lacén, Axel Anderson, René Monclova, Rodolfo Rodríguez, Luis Gonzaga, John García, Adrián Ramos, Jesús “Chú” Martínez, Savio Vega	Thriller, mystery		
Ángeles Perdidos	Raúl Marchand Sánchez	Magali Carrasquillo, Rey Pascual, Andy Montañez, Alexandra Malagón, Domingo Quiñones, Idalia Pérez Garay, Giselle, Alondra Delgado, Néstor Rodulfo, Julio Ramos, Ángel Vázquez, Francisco Capó	Adventure		
2007
Ángel	Jacobo Morales	Braulio Castillo Jr., Jacobo Morales, José Félix Gómez, Yamaris Latorre, Miguel Ángel Suárez, Sara Jarque, René Monclova, Marian Pabón, Teófilo Torres, Jaime Bello, Georgina Borri, Elia Enid Cadillo, Juan Manuel Lebrón, Israel Lugo, Rosalinda López, William Gracias, Esther Marí, Carmen Nydia Velázquez, Alondra Delgado, José Orraca, Luis F. Camacho, Rafael Cancel Miranda, Humberto González, Luis Torres Mercado	Drama, crime		
El Cimarrón	Iván Dariel Ortiz				
Maldeamores	Mariém Pérez Riera, Carlitos Ruiz Ruiz	Luis Guzmán, Teresa Hernández, Luis Gonzaga, Dolores Pedro, Chavito Marrero, Silvia Brito, Miguel Ángel Álvarez, Marisé Álvarez, Georgina Borri, Norman Santiago, Yamil Collazo, Humberto González, Vall Marie Rivera, Laura Andújar, Fernando Tarrazo, Adrián García, Yéssica Delgado	Comedy, romance, drama		
Shut Up and Do it!	Bruno Irizarry	Bruno Irizarry, Pedro Capó	Comedy		
Punto 45	José Orraca	Tego Calderón, Eddie D, Santiago Douglas, Angélica Alcaide, Norma Colón, Maestro, Yaviah, Rey Pirín, Eduardo Montalbán	Crime, drama		
La cocina	Vicente Castro	Michael Stuart, Luisa de los Ríos, Blanca Lissette Cruz, Cristina Soler, Linette Torres, Carlos Esteban Fonseca, Axel Cintrón, Jorge Luis Ramos, Christie Miró, Ivonne Arraiga, Alexandra Malagón, Xavier Torres, Aniel Rosario, Myrna Casas, Velda González, Doel Alicea	Drama		
Los infieles	Vicente Castro	Cordelia González, Braulio Castillo Jr., Yamaris Latorre, Christie Miró, Linette Torres, María Bertólez, Marian Pabón, Alexandra Malagón, Ángela Marí, Carlos Esteban Fonseca, Francisco Capó, Jerry Segarra, Juan Carlos Betancourt, Jonathan Cardenales, Luisa Justiniano, Jesse Calderón, Guiseppe Vázquez, Nancy Millán, Félix Fargas, Virginia Fuente, Javier Lorenzo	Drama		
Nene lindo	Vicente Castro	Sully Díaz, Ektor Rivera, Luisa de los Ríos, Francisco Capó, Dreuxilla Divine, Virginia Romero	Romance, comedy, drama		
El despertar	Vicente Castro	Karla Monroig, Michael Stuart, Jorge Castro, Gilda Haddock, Richard Rondón, Randy Calzada, Zorangelises Serrano, Frances Cardona, José Nogueras	Romance, drama		
La pintura mural de Rafael Ríos Rey	David Moscoso	Cordelia González	Documentary	Documentary on the life and work of muralist Rafael Ríos Rey	
Desde el cielo hasta la tierra	Andrés Ramírez	Jorge Alberti, Carlos Fontané, Sully Díaz, Axel Anderson, Javier de Jesús, Linette Torres, Tito Rojas, Ofelia D’Acosta, Glerysbet Pagán, Ranking Stone, Miguel Fernández, Alexandra Pérez	Drama		
Isla chatarra	Karen Rossi Coughlin	Carlos Guilbe, Gabriel Rodríguez Fernández	Documentary		
2008
Mi Verano con Amanda					
Talento de Barrio	José Iván Santiago	Daddy Yankee			
Muerte en el Paraiso	Abimael Acosta	Arcángel, Alfonsina Molinari, Omar Miranda	Crime drama		
Nothing Like the Holidays					
Las dos caras de Juno	Edmundo H. Rodríguez	Myrna Casas, Ernesto Concepción Moreau, Modesto Lacén, Jonathan Dwayne, Efraín López Neris, René Monclova, Sandra Teres, Ramiro “Ramir” Delgado Ruiz, Óscar Guerrero, Ricardo Álvarez, Magdaly Cruz, Gerardo Ortiz, Albert Rodríguez, Guiseppe Vázquez, Gilberto Valenzuela, Christie Miró	Drama, crime		
Lucía, Ignacio y otras historias	Marcos Zurinaga	María Coral, Ektor Rivera, Fernando Tarrazo, Laura Alemán, Mickey Negrón, Cordelia González, Carlos Miranda, Mario Roche, Jerry Segarra, Linette Torres, Alondra Delgado, Danny Fraticelli	Drama		
La recompensa	Vicente Castro	Yamaris Latorre, Ángel Viera, Jorge Luis Ramos, Jacobo Morales, Gladys Rodríguez, Velda González, Amalia Cruz, Néstor Rodulfo, José Caro, Jonathan Cardenales, Marcos Carlos Cintrón, Joaquín Jarque, Cecilia Argüelles, Dreuxilla Divine, Jorge Antares, Joealis Filippetti, Eric Zayas Martínez, Luis Javier López, Francisco Moris, Josean Rodríguez, Omar Hidalgo, Ricardo Santiago, Noemí Negrón Santos, Jorge de los Ríos	Romance, drama, comedy		
Antes de las once	Andrés Ramírez	Rey Pascual, Rodolfo Rodríguez, Leonardo Sitiriche	Drama		
El mundo secreto de Marina	Sonia Fritz	Lara Torruella, Denise Quiñones, Ernesto Concepción Moreau, Luis Gonzaga, Tony Plana	Adventure, drama, family	Film adaptation of the novel La sirenita sin voz by Kalman Barsy	
Iraq en mí	Roberto Ramos-Perea	War, drama	Luis Javier López, Ricardo Santiago, Gisselle Cortés, Noemí Negrón Santos, Ricardo Magriñá, Yamila Cruz-Martínez, Eddie Fuentes		
Juan Meléndez 6446	Luis Rosario Albert		Documentary	Documentary about life of Juan Meléndez, who was wrongfully charged for a murder he did not commit and spent 17 years on death row until his acquittal in 2002	
2009
Christian y Cristal	Víctor Aldarondo	Deyhaneira Nieves, Kevin Hernandez	Romantic drama	Rated PG	
Miente	Rafi Mercado			Winner: Havana Star Prize for Best Director - 11th Havana Film Festival New York	
Orfanato de cafres	William Rosario Cruz	José Félix Gómez, Amneris Morales, Carlos Alberto López, César Paredes, Belange Rodríguez, Anamín Santiago, Alejandro Amorós, Junior Álvarez, Lydia Echevarría, Jara Morales Cordero	Drama		
Kabo y Platón	Edmundo H. Rodríguez	Aramis Benítez, Albert Torres, Óscar Guerrero, Luis Gonzaga, Sandre Teres, Magali Carrasquillo, René Monclova, Ramiro “Ramir” Delgado Ruiz	Drama		
Jugando al esconder	Vicente Castro	Zoribel Fonalledas, René Monclova, Jimmy Navarro, Marian Pabón, Norman Santiago, Cristina Sesto, Julio Ramos, Jazmin Caratini, Judith González, Jahn Carlo Marrero, Monique Sánchez, Alejandro Santos, Alison Santos, Jesse Calderón, Lucienne Hernández	Drama		
Diez en la música	Mariem Pérez Riera, Arí Maniel Cruz, Kacho López, Gisela Ramos Rosario, Freddie Marrero, Carlos Díaz, Frank Elías, Celso González, Aarón Vega Granados, Anaida Hernández, Ricardo Hernández	Mike Amodeo, Katherine Cepeda, Jerry Medina, Sie7e, Los Zagales, Mima	Documentary, music		
Estampas de Teyo Gracia	Luis Molina Casanova	Juan Ortiz Jiménez, Rey Francisco Quiñones, Pedro Orlando Torres, Gerardo Ortiz, Carlos Marchand, Néstor Rodulfo, Ángel Manuel	Drama	Adaptation of twelve short stories by Puerto Rican writer Abelardo Díaz Alfaro (“El figurín”, “El ejecutivo”, “El muerto encogío”, “La historia de la polilla”, “Julia Rosa”, “El funerario”, “La mujer y su poder de dominio”, “La locura del Rock & Roll”, “Las píldoras juvenilinas”, “Una estatua al ñame”, “El bautizo de la leche”, and “Una suegra lista”)	
Tapia: el primer puertorriqueño	Roberto Ramos-Perea	Gerardo Ortiz, Francisco Moscoso, Luis González Valdés, Roberto Fernández Valledor, Marta Aponte Alsina, Eduardo Forastieri Braschi, Ramón Luis Acevedo	Documentary	Documentary on the life and work of Alejandro Tapia y Rivera	
Ni el diablo	Andrés Ramírez	Rodolfo Rodríguez, Isaac Santiago, Jorge Alberti, Jazmín Caratini, Benjamín López, Lian Machín, Leonardo Sitiriche	Action		
Las estrellas del estuario	Sonia Fritz	Ian Robles, Lucienne Hernández, Óscar Guerrero, Ernesto Concepción Moreau, Iliana García	Adventure, family		
Arquitectura art decó en Puerto Rico	José Artemio Torres	Rafi Torres	Documentary	Documentary on the history of Art Deco in Puerto Rico	
Aquel rebaño azul	Guillermo Gómez Álvarez		Documentary	Documentary that explores the history of police brutality in Puerto Rico	
Oso Blanco	Christian Suau, Ramiro Millán		Documentary	Documentary on the legendary Oso Blanco prison	
Los unos y los otros	Juanchi González	Aris Mejías, Ozzie Forbes, Orlando Rodríguez, Quintin Rivera Toro, Julio Ramos, Pepe Álvarez	Thriller, short		

== 2010s ==
Title	Director	Cast	Genre	Notes	Ref.
2010
Los 17	Noel Quiñones		Documentary		
100,0000	Juan Agustín Márquez		Documentary	Executive producers Noel Quiñones and Soraya Sesto	
Luz	Álvaro Aponte Centeno	Axel Anderson, Iris Martínez	Short film, drama, romance		
El color de la guayaba	Luis Caballero	Efraín López Neris, Myrna Casas, Magali Carrasquillo, Sully Díaz, Jacqueline Duprey, Idenisse Salamán, Teófilo Torres, Francisco Capó, Giovanni Haddock, Daniel Ruiz Jiménez, Kiara Méndez	Drama		
Joel está imposible	William Rosario Cruz	Juan Carlos Arvelo, Joa Tous, Kemel Jamís, Carlos Marchand, Carlos Miranda, Melissa Rodríguez, Linette Torres, Carlos Vega, Yazmín Rivera Irizarry	Drama		
Caos	Raúl García	Edgar Cuevas, Wanda Sais, Manolo Castro, Walter Rodríguez, Sandra Ortiz, Noland Otero, Joaquín Jarque, Letty Contreras, Armando Pardo, Carlos Ruiz	Action, adventure, drama, thriller		
Il Viaggio	Vicente Juarbe	Gil René, Norman Santiago, Yezmín Luzzed, Rubén Cintrón, Gigio Giraldo, Jacobo Morales	Comedy, drama		
Elite	Andrés Ramírez	Frank Perozo, Jorge Alberti, Denise Quiñones, Jean-Paul Polo, Joel Contreras	Action		
Es mejor escucharlo	Javier Colón Ríos	Carlos Marchand, Marisé Álvare, Luis Gonzaga, Efraín Lópes Neris, Jaime Bello, Cecilia Argüelles, Carlos Santos	Short film, drama		
Cicatrices	Elia Enid Cadilla, Víctor González		Documentary		
2011
América	Sonia Fritz	Lymari Nadal, Yancey Arias, Rachel Ticotin, Edward James Olmos, Tony Plana, Yareli Arizmendi, James Callis, Frank Perozo, Eyra Agüero Joubert, Luis Gonzaga, Isel Rodríguez, Monica Steuer, Talia Rothenberg, Isaac Santiago, Marisé Álvarez, Teresa Hernández	Drama	Film adaptation of the novel El sueño de América by Puerto Rican writer Esmeralda Santiago. Selected as the Puerto Rican entry for the Best Foreign Language Film at the 84th Academy Awards.	
The Caller					
Las Carpetas	Maite Rivera Carbonell	Providencia Trabal, Lucía Castellano, Ismael Guadalupe Ortiz, Julio César Andrade, Norma Torres Sanes, Carlos Zayas, Miguel Hudo Ricci, Norma Valle Ferrer, P.J. López	Documentary		
Sábado de Gloria	Gisela Rosario	Milena Pérez Joglar	Short film		
El aquelarre	Alfredo E. Rivas	Aris Mejías, Ernesto Concepción Moreau, Johanna Rosaly, Dolores Pedro, Axel Anderson, Eugenio Monclova, Walter Rodríguez, Mario Roche, José Caro	Horror		
Por carambola	Vicente Castro	Christie Miró, Ektor Rivera, Jodiel Alicea, Zoribel Fonalledas, Camila Monclova, Jorge Luis Ramos	Drama		
Caraballo, máscara y carnaval	David Moscoso	Miguel Caraballo García, Norberto Martell, Néstor Murray Irizarry, Ena. M. Mastey, Miguel Caraballo Vargas	Documentary	Documentary on Miguel Caraballo García and his work on vejigante masks	
Gabi	Zoé Salicrup Junco	Dalia Davi, Aris Mejías, Marisé Álvarez, Ramir Delgado Ruiz, Roy Sánchez-Vahamonde, Leonardo Castro Sitiriche	Short film, drama		
El detective Cojines	Radamés Sánchez	Jaime Hamilton, René Monclova, Myrna Cuevas, Yvonne Caro Caro, Axel Anderson, Eugenio Monclova, Albert Rodríguez	Comedy		
El testigo	Andrés Ramírez	José Manuel, Gil Sanabria, Melissa Serrano, Jorge Antares, Carlos Alfonso, Carlos Alberto López, Manolo Castro, Josean Rivera, Ángel Vázquez, Omar Cruz Soto, Ernesto Franco, Raymond Pagán, José Brocco	Action		
Una identidad en absurdo Vol. 1	Guillermo Gómez Álvarez	Alfredo Carrasquillo, Carlos Pabón	Documentary	Documentary that explores the history of identity politics in Puerto Rico	
Acechada	Kaell Matías	Irmaris Rodríguez, Ricardo Díaz	Short film, drama, thriller		
2012
Los Condenados	Roberto Busó García		Drama		
Mi Santa Mirada	Álvaro Aponte Centeno	Rafael Mercado, Eddie Díaz, Felix Báez, Nelson Acre	Short film, drama	Official selection: Cannes Short Film Competition	
Fracturas Múltiples	Joaquín González	Andrea Martínez, Arturo Gaskins	Short film		
Azucenas	Claudia Calderón		Documentary		
Under My Nails	Arí Maniel Cruz	Kisha Burgos, Iván Camilo, Marilú Acosta	Drama		
Aquel Rebaño Azul	Guillermo Gómez Álvarez		Documentary		
ej·kei	Javier Viqueira, Héctor Hernández		Documentary	Documentary on the history of skating in Puerto Rico	
La Espera Desespera	Coraly Santaliz	Marisé 'Tata' Álvarez, Carlos Rivera Marchand	Romantic comedy		
Broche de Oro	Raúl Marchand Sánchez		Comedy		
La nena se casa...en Navidad	Vicente Castro	Gilberto Santa Rosa, María Coral, Kevin Aponte, Marisol Calero, Gilda Haddock, Pedro Juan Figueroa, Jacqueline Duprey, Cary Oliver, Sonia Portalatín, Ángel Vázquez, Mariana Quiles, Ulises Rodríguez, Juan Manuel Chelo, Cristina Sesto, Marcos Carlos Gavela	Drama, comedy		
El corillo	Vicente Castro	María Coral, Rafael Albarrán, Carlos McConnie, Luis Omar O’Farril, Sully Díaz, Junior Álvarez, Jorge Luis Ramos, Jerry Segarra, Camila Monclova, José Brocco, Yadiliz Barbosa, Rainier Quintana, Limarie Quintero, César Osiris García	Drama		
¿Pacto de silencio?	Vicente Castro	Daniela Droz, Ángela Meyer, Elí Cay, Jorge Luis Ramos, Pedro Juan Figueroa, Laura Alemán, Georgina Borri, Ulises Rodríguez, Eunice Jiménez, Jonathan Cardenales, Jacqueline Duprey, Hiram Delgado, Lucienne Hernández, Luis Omar O’Farril, María Bertólez, Madelyn Ortiz, Yadiliz Barbosa	Drama		
Suda, pedalea, siente el viento	David Moscoso	Juan Gabino, Luis Rafael Robles	Documentary, short	Documentary on the feasibility of bicycles as a means of transportation in San Juan	
Compañeros de lucha	Juan C. Dávila	Juan C. Dávila, Tito Kayak, Imac Morales, Ricardo de Soto, Alfredo Nieves Moreno, Pedro Saade, Juan A. Hernández Mayoral	Documentary	Documentary on the Campamento Playas Pa’l Pueblo in Isla Verde, Puerto Rico	
2013
200 Cartas	Bruno Irizarry	Lin-Manuel Miranda, Jaime Camil, Dayanara Torres, Monica Steuer, Mayra Matos, Iris Chacón	Romantic comedy		
Telequinesis	Mariana Roca Iguina		Short film		
Brainless Juan	Israel Lugo		Documentary	Neo DIVEDCO project. Graphic artist: Omar Velásquez.	
Por amor en el caserío	Luis Enrique Rodríguez Ramos	Anoushka Medina, Xavier Morales, Sully Díaz, Aidita Encarnación, Omar Cruz Soto, Xiomara Rodríguez, Steven Vázquez, Sebastián Vázquez	Drama, action, romance	Adaptation of William Shakespeare's Romeo and Juliet in a Puerto Rican setting.	
El púgil	Ángel Manuel Soto	Ángel Acosta	Documentary, short	Documentary on the career of Ángel Acosta	
Luna vieja	Raisa Bonnet	Laura Cristina Cardona, Julio Ramos, María Velázquez	Short film, drama		
Inés María Mendoza: la palabra como destino	Caridad Sorondo Flores	Braulio Castillo Jr., Idalia Pérez Garay, Sol Crespo Nazario	Documentary	Documentary on the life and work of Inés María Mendoza	
Tinta y Café	Mariana Emmanuelli, Joserro Emmanuelli	José Cotté, Ricardo Álvarez, Teófilo Torres, Adrián García	Drama, thriller, short film		
I Am a Director	Javier Colón Ríos	Carlos Marchand, Joa Tous, Marisé Álvarez, Lillian Hurst, Efraín López Neris, Jacobo Morales, Luis Gonzaga, José Cotté, Isaac Santiago, María Coral, Rodolfo Rodríguez, Cristina Lynch, Luis Cabrera, Laura Alemán, Héctor Escudero, Julio Ramos, Leonardo Sitiriche, Millo Torres, Nasha Santiago, Bianca Noroñas	Comedy, drama		
Música 100x35, notas de una transformación	Sonia Fritz	Luis Gonzaga	Documentary	Documentary on children and young adults from disadvantaged communities that learn how to play an instrument	
Reggaetón: The Movie	Carlos Martín	Natalia Rivera, Jhony Ou, Che Robótico, Manny Montes, Kendo Kaponi, Nanet Muñiz, Maryelle Santiago, Saritza Alvarado, Junior Urrutia, Ricky J. Pérez, Nico Canadá, Ángel Sanjurjo, Omar Cruz Soto, Yaviah	Drama, music		
Alive and Kicking: la historia de Chamaco Ramírez	Eduardo Cintrón, Omar Torres Kortright	Cano Estremera, Cheo Feliciano, Gilberto Santa Rosa, Luis Perico Ortiz, Lalo Rodríguez, Paquito Guzmán, Roberto Angleró, Roberto Roena, Danny Rivera, Tego Calderón, Vico C, Choco Orta, Pupy Cantor, Andy Montañez	Documentary	Documentary about the life and career of salsa singer Chamaco Ramírez	
2014
Las Vacas con Gafas	Alex Santiago Perez	Daniel Lugo, Cristina Soler, Raúl Carbonell Jr., Gladys Rodríguez, Sara Jarque, Jaime Bello, Georgina Borri, Jazmín Caratini, René Monclova, Eugenio Monclova, Adrián García, Jorge Castro, Junior Álvarez	Drama, comedy		
Mala Mala	Antonio Santini, Dan Sickles	April Carrión, Denise Rivera, Soraya Santiago Solla, Alberic Prados, Samantha Close, Ivana Fred	Documentary	Documentary on the trans community in Puerto Rico	
El Antillano	Tito Román Rivera	Féliz Ojeda Reyes, Josefina Toledo, Paul Estrade, Santiago Castro Ventura	Documentary	Life of Ramón Emeterio Betances	
Rosaura	Gilo Rivera	Yinoelle Colón, Marisol Calero, Ernesto Concepción Moreau, Félix Monclova, Braulio Castillo Jr., Elia Enid Cadilla, Junior Álvarez, Ángela Meyer, Elsie Moreau, Gustavo Juarbe, Mariangelie Vélez, Noelia Crespo, Dolores Pedro, Magali Carrasquillo, Luis Omar O’Farril, María Coral, Camila Monclova, Cristina Sesto, René Monclova, Viviana Falcón, Natalia Villarrejo, Ángela Marí, Magdaly Cruz, Ulises Rodríguez, José Caro, María Bertólez, Andrés López, Félix Monclova hijo	Drama	Based on the life of actress Rosaura Andreu	
Cinema Puerto Rico: una antropología visual	Freddie Rodríguez, Mariel Marrero	Ivonne Belén, Jacobo Morales, Marcos Zurinaga, Karen Rosi Coughlin, Alex Santiago Pérez, Benjamín López, Rose Marie Bernier, Braulio Castillo Jr., Ineabelle Colón, Manuel Valdés Pizzini, Eduardo Rosado, Demetrio Fernández, José Artemio Torres, Roberto Ramos-Perea, Marisel Flores Patton, Teresa Previdi	Documentary	Documentary on the history of Puerto Rican cinema through films, documentaries, and commercials from the early 20th century to the emerging cinema of today	
Los Reyes: la verdadera historia del Búster y el Camaleón	Vicente Castro	Jorge Alberti, Georgina Duluc, José Brocco, Jorge Luis Ramos, Laura Alemán, José Luis Oyola, Sully Díaz, Mónica Pastrana, Carmen Nydia Velázquez, Glory Montalvo, Carlos Miranda, Alexandra Malagón, Joaquín Jarque, Luisa de los Ríos, Jerry Segarra, Gavi Gil, Hiram Delgado, Jorge Antares, Xiomara Rodríguez, Saritza Alvarado, Doel Alicea, Linette Torres, Ramiro “Ramir” Delgado Ruiz, Yamilé Schécker, Francisco Capó, Alfredo Domínguez, Jorge Armando Rivera, Willnette Suárez Díaz, Héctor Oliveras García, Mariana Quiles, Zuriel Ramos, Omar Cruz Soto, Ángel Días Cruz	Crime, thriller	Based on the life of drug lord José Figueroa Agosto, commonly known as “Junior Cápsula”	
El hijo de Ruby	Gisela Rosario Ramos	Lio Villahermosa	Short documentary		
La promesa	Vicente Juarbe	Rey Pascual, Vicente Juarbe, Idalia Pérez Garay, Flora Pérez Garay	Documentary	Documentary of Puerto Rican customs and traditions	
La Comay: Aparente y Alegadamente	Andrés Ramírez	Liza Lugo, Manolo Travieso Hurst, Kobbo Santarrosa, Héctor Travieso, Jorge Pabón “El Molusco”, Carmen Jovet, Rubén Sánchez, Jorge Santini, Pedro Julio Serrano, Jorge Seijo	Documentary	Documentary on SuperXclusivo and its subsequent boycott and cancellation over homophobic remarks made in the show	
Lola	Xavier Medina	Sara Cristina Cruz Cepeda, José Félix Gómez, Aris Mejías, Luis Gonzaga, Javier Cardona	Short film, drama	Puerto Rico's Official Selection for the 2014 SOHO International Film Festival	
Más que el agua	Benjamín I. Cardona	Bejamín I. Cardona, Isabel Arraiza, Francheska Mattei, Jacqueline Duprey, Ronald Torres, Julio Ramos, Lydia Echevarría	Drama		
Armonía	Gabriel Coss	Miguel Zenón, José Aponte, Jan Michael Giménez, Leonardo Pedrogo, Kaleb Ortiz, Deborah Rivera, Arnaldo Colón	Documentary		
Verdades y mentiras	Víctor Marín	Rosa del Mar Rodríguez, Carlos Vega, Néstor Rodulfo, Raúl Rosado, Cristina Sesto, Joealis Filippetti, Giovanni Haddock	Thriller, drama		
2015
The Last Colony	Juan Agustín Márquez	Juan Agustín Márquez, Alfredo Carrasquillo, Luis Fortuño, Rafael Cancel Miranda, María de Lourdes Santiago, Pedro Pierluisi, Aníbal Acevedo Vilá, Ricky Rosselló, Don Young	Documentary		
Los Domirriqueños	Eduardo Ortíz	Raúl Carbonell Jr., Fausto Mata, Jorge Pabón “El Molusco”, Stephany Liriano, Aquiles Correa, Danilo Beauchamp, Tony Pascual, Jessyka Rodríguez, Alina Vargas, Carlos Alberto López, Blas Díaz, Antonio Sánchez, Alejandro Gil, Carlos Vega, Xiomara Rodríguez, Jorge Antares, Carmen Nydia Velázquez, Adrián García, Omar Cruz Soto, Chente Ydrach, Norman Santiago	Comedy		
La Cenicienta Boricua	Vicente Castro	María Coral, Suzette Bacó, Braulio Castillo Jr., Jerry Segarra, Francisco Capó, Yezmín Luzzed, Mariana Quiles, Yadiliz Barbosa, Rainier Quintana, Raymond Rassi	Drama, comedy	Adaptation of Cinderella to a Puerto Rican setting	
Romeo y Romeo	Luis Caballero	Denzel O’Neill, Jacob Fuentes, Efraín López Neris, Amneris Morales, Willie Denton, Jacqueline Duprey, Lillian Hurst, Nancy Millán, Edgar García	Romance, short		
Una boda en Castañer	Raúl García	Jazmín Caratini, Michael Stuart, Braulio Castillo Jr., Sara Pastor, Adrián García, Efraín López Neris, Noelia Crespo, Marian Pabón, Georgina Borri, Edgar Cuevas, Maribel Quiñones, Jessyka Rodríguez, Carlitos Ramírez, Valeria Bracero, Marcos Cintrón, Richard Rondón, Elsie Moreau, Joealis Filippetti, Luis Omar O’Farril, Melody Rose Vendrell, Pedro Meléndez	Romance, comedy		
La Granja	Ángel Manuel Soto	Jazmin Caratini, Amneris Morales, Carlos Esteban Fonseca, Wilfred Omar Pérez, Andrea Ruiz, Xavier Morales, Ian Daryk Ramos, Eddie Díaz, Norma Colón, Aurelio Lima, John García, Omar Cruz Soto, Yulie Padilla	Drama		
La generación del estanbai	Juan C. Dávila	Efraín Cortés, Keishla Ramírez, Jesús Salgado, Nelson Escudero, Inés Quiles	Documentary, short	Documentary on the challenges faced by young Puerto Rican laborers amidst an economic crisis	
Vieques: una batalla inconclusa	Juan C. Dávila	Tito Auger, Arturo Massol, Tito Kayak, María de Lourdes Santiago	Documentary	Documentary on the continuous efforts of the people of Vieques, Puerto Rico demanding full decontamination and returnal of the land exploited by the U.S. Navy, after its exiting in 2003	
Yahaira	Álvaro Aponte Centeno	Marisé Álvarez, Israel Lugo, Eddie Díaz, Lucas Feliciano, Lorena López, Yussef Soto, Rafael Aponte	Short film, drama		
Hasta que la celda nos separe	Marianna Emmanuelli, Joserro Emmanuelli	Cristian Miranda Vélez, Gretza Merced	Short film, crime, comedy		
15 Faros de Puerto Rico	Sonia Fritz		Documentary	Documentary on the history behind the 15 lighthouses of Puerto Rico and their lighthouse keepers	
3000	Skip Font	Modesto Lacén, Yezmín Luzzed, Robert García Cooper, Guillermo Valedón	Drama	Based on the life and career of Roberto Clemente and his 3000 hit	
Mi Princesa	Carlos Jiménez Flores	Roberto Pérez Pérez, Darlene Vazquetelles, Carlos Esteban Fonseca, Alfred D. Herger Jr.	Drama, romance		
Yerba Mala Nunca Muere: La Historia de La Mancha del Jardín	Ricky Gómez	Josean Rivera, Alvin González, Danny Soto, Joselin Ramos, Bladimir Muñiz, Osvaldo Rodríguez, Ángel Omy Rey	Documentary, music	Documentary that chronicles the history and impact of the pioneering rock band La Mancha del Jardín	
2016
Antes Que Cante El Gallo	Arí Maniel Cruz	Cordelia González, Miranda Purcell, Kisha Tikina Burgos, José Eugenio Hernández, Isadora Lee Cintrón, Pablo Alicea, Sylvia Bofill, Laura Isabel Cabrera, Israel Lugo, Óscar Guerrero, Mario Guerra, Iliana García, Yamil Collazo, Nami Heldfeld	Drama		
Angélica	Marisol Gómez-Mouakad	Mapenzi Chibale Nonó, Johanna Rosaly, Kisha Tikina Burgos, René Monclova, Modesto Lacén, Willie Denton, Yamil Collazo	Drama		
Bienvenido Don Goyito	Gilo Rivera	René Monclova, Sara Pastor, Félix Monclova hijo, Mariana Monclova, Sara Jarque, Cristina Soler, Ineabelle Colón, Noelia Crespo, Brian Tester, Jorge Castro, Ulises Rodríguez, Sebastián López	Comedy	Film adaptation of the 1965 play Bienvenido, Don Goyito by Manuel Méndez Ballester	
La llamarada	Edmundo H. Rodríguez	Ernesto Concepción Moreau, Braulio Castillo Jr., Cristina Sesto, Raúl Carbonell Jr., Efraín López Neris, Junior Álvarez, Ángela Meyer, Marisol Calero, Francisco Capó, Gerardo Ortiz, Ulises Rodríguez, Joealis Filippetti, Evelyn Rosario, Carlos Ruiz, Melissa Reyes, Roberto Ramos-Perea, Ernesto Aquino, Dolores Pedro	Drama	Film adaptation of the novel La llamarada by Enrique Laguerre	
Hello y Goodbye	Iván Bonilla	Ian Daryk Ramos, Adrián García, José Caro, Isadora Lee Cintrón	Drama, comedy, short		
Islas entretejidas: Puerto Rico y Córcega	Alfredo E. Rivas	Lorenzo Dragoni, Jean-Christophe Liccia, María D. Luque, Mary F. Gallart Calzada, Enrique Vivoni Farage, Mae Berlingeri, Enid Vincenti, Marie-Jeanne Paoletti, Hugo Díaz Molini, Joseph Santoni, José Rivera Tollinche, Georges Leandri, Audrey Giuliani, Jonathan Delgado	Documentary	Documentary on the Corsican migration to Puerto Rico and their influence on Puerto Rican culture and architecture	
Extra Terrestres	Carla Cavina	Marisé Álvarez, Sunshine Logroño, Laura Alemán, Yamil Collazo, Elba Escobar, Mauricio Alemañy, Prakriti Maduro, Eyra Agüero Joubert, Ricardo Álvarez	Drama		
Vivimos para esa noche	Luis Molina Casanova	Guiseppe Vázquez, Cristina Soler, Gilberto Concepción Moreau, Marian Pabón, Julio Ramos		Based on the life and work of Carlos Manuel Rodríguez	
Yo soy un político	Javier Colón Ríos	Carlos Marchand, Denise Quiñones, Héctor Oliveras, Lillian Hurst, Carlos Santos, Diego de la Texera, Jay Fonseca, Efraín López Neris	Comedy		
De Puerto Rico para el mundo	Carlitos Ruiz Ruiz, Mariem Pérez Riera	Ismael Miranda, Manny Manuel, Andy Montañez, José Feliciano, Black Guayaba, Pedro Capó, Jowell & Randy, PJ Sin Suela, Roselyn Sánchez, Rita Moreno, Ismael Cruz Córdova, Luis Guzmán, Tommy Torres, La Tribu de Abrante, SieteNueve, Obie Bermúdez, Rosie Pérez, Justina Machado, Freddy Rodríguez	Documentary		
Croatto: la huella de un emigrante	Mariem Pérez Riera	Hermes Croatto, Alejandro Croatto, Ale Croatto, Mara Croatto, Leonardo Croatto, Edelweiss “Tim” Croatto, Nelly Croatto, Tony Croatto, Javier Santiago, Silverio Pérez	Documentary	Documentary on the life and work of Tony Croatto	
La Mujer Maravilla Sobre Ruedas	Omar Camilo Ramos	Ileana Torres Báez	Documentary		
Emergencia: Un documental sobre Súperaquello	Gisela Rosario Ramos	Eduardo Alegría, Francis Pérez, Patricia Dávila, Jorge Castro, Pablo Santiago	Documentary	Documentary on the alternative rock band Súperaquello	
Cal y Arena	Elia Enid Cadilla	Pedro Telémaco, Milly Quezada, Giselle, Glory Montalvo, Joshua Velázquez, Anaba Reyes, Leo Álvarez, Carlos Esteban Fonseca, Nelson del Valle, Rucco Gandía, Carla Alvarado, Carlos Miranda	Drama		
El buen vasallo	Arturo Lizardi	Héctor Escudero, Arturo Lizardi, Jorge Antares, Omar Cruz Soto, Carmelo Betancourt, Michael J. Morris, Luis Rosado	Drama		
El Chata	Gustavo Ramos Perales	Modesto Lacén, Alexon Duprey, Camila Monclova, Mariana Monclova, Carlos Miranda, Jerome Robles, Eyra Agüero Joubert	Drama		
Desalambrando	Pedro A. Rivera		Documentary	Documentary based on the book “Desalambrar” by Liliana Cotto Morales	
Lunas Rojas	Samari Vega	Arturo Lizardi, Sandra Ortiz, Isabelle Lizardi, Trini Menéndez	Thriller, science fiction, short		
2017
Filiberto	Freddie Marrero	Shorty Castro, Ron Kuby, Juan Enrique Segarra-Palmer	Documentary	Life of Filiberto Ojeda Ríos	
Nuyorican Básquet	Julio César Torres, Ricardo Olivero Lora	Pedro Pietri, Néstor Cora, Georgie Torres, Michael Killanin, Carlos Romero Barceló, Fufi Santori, Charlie Bermúdez, Flor Meléndez, Raymond Dalmau, Román Pérez, Juan R. Rodríguez Román	Documentary, drama	Documentary about the 1979 National Basketball Team of Puerto Rico	
El grito en los puños	Julio César Torres	Kidany Reyes, Canito Marrero, Josué Machado	Documentary		
Al Final del Eclipse	Jacobo Morales	Yamaris Latorre, Ernesto Concepción Moreau, Jorge Luis Ramos, Jerry Segarra, Jacobo Morales	Drama		
Dos caminos	Luis Enrique Rodríguez Ramos	Luis Sebastián Borges, Carlos Miranda, Alejandra Espinoza, Modesto Lacén, Orlando Lugo, Maritxell Carrero, Alí Warrington, Ian Daryk Ramos, José Luis Oyola, Sebastián Vázquez	Drama		
Vico C: La vida del filósofo	Eduardo Ortiz	Omar Cruz Soto, Mariangelie Vélez, César Farrait, Xavier Morales, Luisa Benítez, Bryan Reyes, Osvaldo Otero, Nore-Liz Latorre, Ramiro “Ramir” Delgado Ruiz, Blas Díaz, LoUPz, Ángel Díaz Cruz, Luis Clemente Rivera	Drama, biopic	Based on the life of Vico C	
El silencio del viento	Álvaro Aponte Centeno	Israel Lugo, Kairiana Núñez Santaliz, Amanda Lugo, Elia Enid Cadilla, Iris Martínez, Eddie Díaz, Aurelio Lima	Drama		
Mona: tesoro del Caribe	Sonia Fritz		Documentary	Documentary on the history and fauna of Isla de Mona	
Dos caminos	Luis Enrique Rodríguez Ramos	Luis Sebastián Borges, Modesto Lacén, Alejandra Espinoza, Carlos Miranda, Alí Warrington, Orlando Lugo, Maritxell Carrero	Drama		
Residente	Residente	Residente, Lin-Manuel Miranda, Bombino, Roger Sayer, Rafael Cancel Miranda	Documentary, music	Documentary on the journey embarked by Puerto Rican rapper Residente to create his debut solo album Residente	
2018
Sol de Medianoche	Douglas Pedro Sánchez	Pedro Capó, Aris Mejías, Laura Alemán, Modesto Lacén, Xavier Torres, Cordelia González	Drama		
¿Quién eres tú?	Arí Maniel Cruz	José Félix Gómez, Teresa Hernández, Kisha Tikina Burgos, Luis Gonzaga, Luis Betancourt, Cordelia González, Marisé Álvarez, Jimmy Navarro	Drama		
La bruma y el descanso	Fran Zayas	Raymond Rassi, Jerry Segarra	Drama		
Venus	Raisa Bonnet	Ariam Liz Gutiérrez, Teresa Hernández, Paulis Cofresí, Katira Álvarez, Julio Ramos, Maximiliano Rivas, Leslie Van Zadt	Short film, drama		
Cartas de amor para una ícona	Gisela Rosario Ramos	Lucecita Benítez	Documentary	Documentary on the life and career of Lucecita Benítez	
Ser grande	Karen Rossi Coughlin		Documentary		
Héctor El Father: Conocerás la verdad	Joel Antonio Colón	Héctor El Father, Lian Machín, Rainier Quintana, Daddy Yankee, Wisin, Tito El Bambino	Drama, documentary	Autobiography of Héctor El Father	
Vietnam, Puerto Rico	Gabriel Miranda		Documentary	Documentary on the community of Barrio Vietnam in Guaynabo and its fight against illegal displacement	
Juana(s) Matos: Un recorrido comunitario	Glorimar Marrero Sánchez	Myra Galíndez, Nadjah Galíndez, Isabel Rodríguez, Aida Calvente Rosa, Luz Curbelo Piñero	Documentary	Documentary on the life of Juana Matos and her impact on the municipality of Cataño	
Candlelight	Verónica Ortiz Calderón	Catherine Mercado-Muñiz, Carmen Yulín, Donald Trump, David Begnaud, Ricky Rosselló	Short documentary		
2019
Marcelo	Eduardo Ortiz	Jorge Pabón “El Molusco”, Ramiro “Ramir” Delgado Ruiz, Blas Sien Díaz, Samuel Jove	Comedy		
El Hijo Perdido	Eduardo Ortiz	Erik “Chicho” Rodríguez, Osvaldo Friger, Noelia Crespo, Chucho Avellanet, Pedro Juan Texidor	Comedy		
Los Domirriqueños 2	Eduardo Ortiz	Jorge Pabón “El Molusco”, Fausto Mata, Tony Pascual, Aquiles Correa, Antonio Sánchez, Alejandro Gil, Danilo Beauchamp	Comedy		
...perra, compañía...	William Rosario Cruz	Yazmín Rivera Irizarry, Cristian Miranda, Carli Dávila, Eduardo Alegría, Kemel Jamís	Drama		
Dak’ Toká Taíno	Alba García-Rivas	Sally Collazo, Frankie Cordero, Amneris Morales, Vianez M. Morales, Kervin Peralta, Jessica Simón, Lorrianne Wynn	Family, drama, short	Live-action puppet film. The title is in the taíno language and it translates to “I am taíno”.	
Otra boda en Castañer	Raúl García	Braulio Castillo Jr., Sara Pastor, Jazmín Caratini, Michael Stuart, Carlos Cintrón, Richard Rondón, Francis Rosas	Comedy, drama		
María	Zoé Salicrup Junco	María Coral, Isel Rodríguez, Luis Gonzaga	Short film, drama		
Prótesis	Ariel Annexy	Carlos Marchand, Denise Quiñones, Sunshine Logroño, Bruno Irizarry, Modesto Lacén, Israel Lugo, Yamil Collazo, Iliana García, Israel Castro Vélez	Romance, horror, comedy		
La patria de los abuelos	Ray Figueroa	Rey Pascual, Flor Joglar de García, Karimar Pérez, Lydiette Crespo, Gloria Álvarez, Kenniel Morales, Blanchet Landrau, Armando Rivera Ruiz			
(él) corazón delator	Guillermo Gómez Álvarez		Documentary	Documentary that explores the history of gender violence in Puerto Rico	
Voces de María: Nueva Normalidad	Augusto Suárez Vicenty, Alondra Yarí Negrón Rivera	Johstean Miguel Santiago, Alfredo Rivas, Krystal Marrero, Alondra Yarí Negrón Rivera	Short documentary		
Anécdotas: Prom	Carlos Manuel Sánchez Díaz	Antonio Hernández, Daniel Rosa Hunter, Emmanuel Santiago Tejas, Sara Hernández, David Rivera Díaz	Comedy		

== 2020s ==
Title	Director	Cast	Genre	Notes	Ref.
2020
Yerba Buena	Bruno Irizarry	Karla Monroig, Isel Rodríguez, Jessica Rodríguez	Comedy		
El accidente feliz	Paloma Suau	Antonio Martorell, Gabriel Suau, Lin-Manuel Miranda, Rosa Luisa Márquez, Luis Rafael Sánchez, Paloma Suau	Documentary	Documentary on the life and work of Puerto Rican painter Antonio Martorell	
Todos íbamos a ser reyes	Márel Malaret	Juan Velázquez, Aníbal Santana, José Armando Torres	Documentary		
Aquí	Carlos Mario	Evelyn Cordero-Olavarría	Short documentary		
Adolfina Vive	Silvestre Chirimbillo		Short documentary		
Landfall	Cecilia Aldarondo		Documentary		
La ráfaga	Edgar García	Héctor Enrique Rodríguez, Edgar García, Jafet Ortiz, Guillermo Díaz Martínez, Jaffette Rolón	Drama		
2021
El cuartito	Marcos Carnevale	Claribel Medina, Isel Rodríguez, Fausto Mata, Mario de la Rosa, Ricky Martin, Ianis Guerrero, Liz Dieppa, Ramiro “Ramir” Delgado Ruiz	Comedy, drama		
La Última Gira	Douglas Pedro Sánchez	Ektor Rivera, Obie Bermúndez, Modesto Lacén, Isel Rodríguez	Biopic, musical		
Perfume de Gardenias	Gisela Rosario Ramos	Luz María Rondón, Carmen Nydia Velázquez Georgina Borri, Flor Joglar, Magali Carrasquillo, Katira María, Antonio Martorell	Drama, comedy		
La Noche Que Nunca Pasó	Luis Enrique Rodríguez Ramos	Anna Malavé, Julianna Rivera Díaz	Thriller, short		
Simulacros de liberación	Juan C. Dávila	Scott Barbés Caminero, David Begnaud, Bad Bunny, Juanita Caldas Medina, José Carrión III, Carmen Yulín Cruz, Sean Duffy, Residente, Sugeily Rodríguez Lebrón, Bernie Sanders, Zoan T. Dávila Roldán, Juan C. Dávila, Gabriel Díaz Rivera, Verónica Figueroa Huertas, Ariadna Godreau Aubert, Amy Goodman, Luis Gutiérrez, Natalie Jaresko, Julia Keleher, Rogelio Maldonado Rivera, Mercedes Martínez Padilla	Documentary	Documentary on the Puerto Rican protest wave of 2016–2019, which culminated in the Telegramgate protests and the resignation of governor Ricardo Rosselló. This documentary also follows the Jornada Se Acabaron Las Promesas movement.	
Zack: Enfrentamiento Mortal	Joseph Lando	Joseph Lando, Rosina Grosso, Blas Sien Díaz, Ingrid Marie Rivera, Jaime Irizarry, Leonardo Castro, Raúl Medina, Jua Nicanor Flores, Karlo Martínez, Enrique Abbad Sinigaglia, Alfonso Rodríguez, Edwin E. Rodríguez, Derek Arroyo, Randy Villa, Juan Pibernus, Ramiro “Ramir” Delgado Ruiz, Letty Contreras, Lian Machín, Gustavo Rivera Martínez, Jorge Antares, Lorena López, Omalik Rosado	Action		
El First Date	Adrián Borges	Antonio Hernández, Valeria Maysonet, Roy Sánchez-Vahamonde	Short film, comedy		
Chimenea de la muerte	Yarelmi Iglesias Vázquez		Short documentary		
Nuevo Rico	Kristian Mercado Figueroa	Jackie Cruz, Antonio Vizcarrondo, Ferando Ramos, Víctor Ramos, Josh Madoff	Short animation		
2022
Picando Alante	Israel Lugo	Modesto Lacén, René Monclova, Isel Rodríguez, Marisé Álvarez, Cristina Soler, Lourdes Quiñones	Drama, comedy		
San Juan, más allá de las murallas	Mariem Pérez Riera	Ismael Cruz Córdova, Don Castor, Israel Lugo	Historical documentary		
Serán las dueñas de la tierra	Juanma Pagán Teitelbaum	Alfredo Aponte Zayas, Stephanie Rodríguez Ocasio, Ian Pagán Roig	Documentary		
Todo por amor	Luis Enrique Rodríguez Ramos	José Enrique Segarra, Juliana Rivera Díaz, Anna Malavé, Néstor Rodulfo, José Félix Gómez, Heyda Salamán, Modesto Lacén, Karina A. Torres, Vanyarianna Ortiz, Amanda Kairuz, Emmanuel Reyes, Scottie Durán, Kennette Calderón, Cristian Ambert, Antonio Morales	Drama, romance		
Los Foodtruckeros	Eduardo Ortiz	Carlos Vega, Carmen Luvana, Carmen Nydia Velázquez, Erik “Chicho” Rodríguez, Francis Rosas, Jasond Calderón, Jorge Antares, Junior Álvarez, Osvaldo Friger, Rafael José, Tita Guerrero	Comedy		
Los Reyes de la Salsa	Raúl García	Alfredo de Quesada, Omar Torres Molina, Yaiza Figueroa, Linette Torres, Modesto Lacén, Edgar Cuevas, Albert Rodríguez, Manolo Castro, Jorge Castro, Tito Puente Jr., José Brocco, Ramiro “Ramir” Delgado Ruiz	Drama, music	Based on the life and career of salsa duo Richie Ray and Bobby Cruz	
After the Boats Left	Sonia Fritz		Short documentary		
Receta no incluída	Juliana Maité Irizarry	Maritere Vélez, Gabriel Leyva, Junior Álvarez, Carola García, Mariana Monclova, Yussef Soto	Drama		
Rafael Cancel Miranda: “I'm not sorry for what I did”	Ana María García	Rafael Cancel Miranda	Documentary	Documentary on the life of Rafael Cancel Miranda and the events that led to the 1954 United States Capitol shooting	
2023
PsiQuis: Un Giro Decolonial	Tito Román Rivera	Tito Román Rivera	Documentary		
La Pecera	Glorimar Marrero Sánchez	Isel Rodríguez, Modesto Lacén, Magali Carrasquillo, Maximiliano Rivas, Georgina Borri, Carola García, Anamín Santiago, Nancy Millán	Drama	First Puerto Rican film to be nominated for a Goya Award	
Érase una vez en el Caribe	Ray Figueroa	Héctor Aníbal, Essines Aponte, Modesto Lacén, Fele Martínez, Néstor Rodulfo, Jeffrey Holsman	Action, fiction, drama		
Voces de Pasión	Sonia Fritz	Joel Prieto, Laura Pabón, Meechot Marrero, Lirisa Martínez, Rafael Dávila	Documentary, music		
Vecino	Rolando Meléndez	Javi Vecino Cintrón	Short documentary	Documentary on the life and career of Santurce-native muralist Javi Vecino Cintrón. Part of the NEO DIVEDCO 4 selection for the Santurce es Ley 2023 festival.	
La Barbería	César Berríos	Joe C. Ramos, Antonio “Puruco” Latimer	Short documentary	Documentary on the barbershop Coco's Style & Cuts, located in San Juan, Puerto Rico. Part of the NEO DIVEDCO 4 selection for the Santurce es Ley 2023 festival.	
Aroma de azucenas	Julián Garnik	Saúl Dávila	Short documentary	Documentary on the famous flower vendor Saúl Dávila, who has been selling daylillies for more than 50 years throughout Puerto Rico. Part of the NEO DIVEDCO 4 selection for the Santurce es Ley 2023 festival.	
Cangrejos	Michelle Malley Campos		Short documentary	Part of the NEO DIVEDCO 4 selection for the Santurce es Ley 2023 festival	
Vejigantes	Roberto Ramos-Perea	Marilyn Pupo, Modesto Lacén, Mariana Quiles, Carmen Nydia Velázquez, Edwin Emil Moró	Drama	Film adaptation of the play Vejigantes by Puerto Rican playwright Francisco Arriví	
La Comuna	Linda D. Maymí	Maritere Vélez, Yussef Soto, Delia Isabel Rivera, Catalina Morales, Miguel Sabalier, Robert Duffin	Drama		
Antonia, la estudiante de Arecibo	José Artemio Torres	Hiram Sánchez Martínez, Jenny Martínez Lagares, José Artemio Torres	Documentary	Documentary on the life and assassination of Antonia Martínez	
Santiago de las mujeres	Rosamary Berríos Hernández		Documentary		
Nos Persiguen	Paulis Cofresí		Short film, drama		
También la Semilla	Llaima Suwani Sanfiorenzo	iLe	Short documentary		
2024
23 Horas	Bruno Irizarry	Jeirmarie Osorio, Roy Sánchez-Vahamonde, Modesto Lacén, Ricky Robles Cruz	Adventure, comedy, science fiction, fantasy		
Chona 2, la puerca asesina	Sunshine Logroño	Marian Pabón, Aurelio “Yeyo” Lima, Camila Monclova, Luis Gonzaga, Raymond Gerena, Ackerly Cedeño, CJ Santana, Alejandra Carpio, Kiko Blade, Alexandra Echevarri, Sebastián Vázquez	Horror, comedy		
Punta Salinas	María del Mar Rosario	Katia Pacheco Báez, Natalia Berríos Arroyo, Sergio Cora, Mía Echevarría, Mariela Candelario	Short film, romance, drama		
El episodio	Samari Vega	Paola Millán Ortiz, Arturo Lizardi, Siul Valentín	Drama, thriller, fantasy		
El Bachatero del Diablo	Eduardo “Transfor” Ortiz	Jason Calderón, Esteban Ruiz, Érika Andújar, Juan Botta, Herbert Cruz, Ricardo André Lugo, Natasha Ortiz, Marieli Durán	Horror, comedy		
El Jacho: Una Leyenda Puertorriqueña	Adrián Borges Estrada	Angel Gonzalez, Delia Isabel, Mafe Sotomayor, Nilka Ramos, Antonio Hernández, José García	Short film, horror, slasher	Short film based on the Puerto Rican legend El Jacho Centeno.	
Las Super Estrellas de la Lucha Libre	Eduardo “Transfor” Ortiz	Jaime Espinal, Alexis Rosado, Juan Pablo Díaz, Osvaldo Friger, Carlos Vega, Luis Ponce, Edgar Cueva, Guillermo Valedón, Omar Cruz Soto, Xiomara Yordán	Drama, sports		
2025
La Tormenta	Ethan Maniqus	Rita Moreno, PJ Sin Suela, Carlos Delgado, Rafael Rodriguez Mercado	Documentary		
2026
2027
2028
2029

== See also ==
- Cinema of Puerto Rico
