= Zoilo Cajigas Sotomayor =

Puerto Rican santero (1858–1962)

Zoilo Cajigas Sotomayor (June 28, 1858 – 1962) was a Puerto Rican santero, a folk artist who makes religious statuettes of saints and biblical figures known as santos. He was known for his piety and adherence to traditional Hispanic folk art methods. Many examples of his work exist in the Museo de los Santos de Palo in San Juan, Puerto Rico. He was the subject of a 1954 Division of Community Education film directed by Amilcar Tirado titled El Santero.

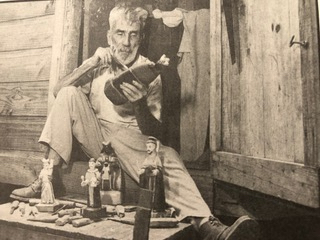
Zoilo Cajigas

== Biography ==
Zoilo Cajigas was born in Aguada, Puerto Rico in 1858 and served as an altar boy at his local church. The film about Cajigas' life depicts him as an ascetic who keeps to himself and creates his wood carved saints in prayerful solitude, although the film may have been partially fictionalized for dramatic effect. His son, Eleno Cajigas Badillo followed in his father's footsteps and was also a santero. Zoilo Cajigas lived to be 110 years old and died in 1962.

== Art and legacy ==
Zoilo Cajigas' santos are wood carved statuettes of various saints and biblical figures. The creation of santos is usually characterized as a religious practice itself, much like prayer. Ricardo Alegría was interested in Cajigas' work and may have had a hand in the creation of the 1954 film about the artist. A school in Aguada, Puerto Rico is named after the artist. The artist Rafael Tufiño was inspired by Zoilo Cajigas' santos.
