= Cayo (film) =

2005 film directed by Vicente Juarbe

- Directed by: Vicente Juarbe
- Written by: Ineabelle Colón; Pedro Muniz
- Produced by: Pedro Muniz
- Starring: Roselyn Sánchez; Iván Camilo; Carlos Esteban Fonseca; Idalia Pérez Garay
- Release date: 2005
- Country: Puerto Rico
- Language: Spanish
- Budget: $1.2 million

Cayo is a 2005 Puerto Rican film directed by Vicente Juarbe and written by Ineabelle Colón and Pedro Muñiz. The film also stars Roselyn Sánchez.

== Plot ==
The film follows the life of Iván, a former Vietnam War veteran (who later becomes a New York City police officer) who returns to his childhood home island of Culebra in Puerto Rico, after he is diagnosed with cancer. Married to his longtime love, Julia, he tries to reconnect with his former best friend, Kike, who has estranged himself from the couple after Julia broke his heart and married Iván instead.

== Cast ==
- Roselyn Sánchez as Young Julia
- Ivan Camilo as Kike
- Raul Carbonell, Jr. as Willie
- Kamar de los Reyes as Young Ivan
- Carlos Esteban Fonseca as Ivan
- Ineabelle Colón as Matilde
- Yamaris Latorre as Lourdes
- Idalia Pérez Garay as Julia
- Aris Mejias Agosto as Aidita
- Kaly Cordova as Guys in NYC

== See also ==
- Cinema of Puerto Rico
- List of films set in Puerto Rico
- List of Puerto Rican Academy Award winners and nominees

== Sources ==
- Todo listo para el estreno de Cayo by Miguel López Ortíz.
- Roselyn Sanchez cosecha lo sembrado by Daniela Torres-Mattus.
