= Abdiel Colberg =

Puerto Rican television producer and movie director

- Born: Abdiel Colberg Birriel; December 20, 1957 (age 67); Mayagüez, Puerto Rico
- Occupation(s): Television producer, movie director
- Years active: 1975–present
- Notable work: Los Díaz de Doris (1999), Aventura Verde (2010)

Abdiel Colberg (born December 20, 1957) is a Puerto Rican television producer and movie director. Among the movies which he directed and co-wrote is Los Díaz de Doris (1999), a drama starring Cordelia González, Braulio Castillo, Jr., Raul Davila and Alba Raquel Barros.

== Early years ==
Colberg (birth name: Abdiel Colberg Birriel) was born in the town of Mayagüez, Puerto Rico. He began his career in 1975, as a coordinator for a local television program called Sábado de Estrellas (Saturday of Stars). In 1980, he went to work for Badillo/Compton, a public relations agency, where he produced and directed television commercials for companies such as Pepsi-Cola, Banco Popular de Puerto Rico, Procter & Gamble, Nabisco and many others.

== Movie director ==
1987 marked Colberg's film directing debut, with the musical Sueño de Navidad (Christmas Dream) which was presented at San Juan's Centro de Bellas Artes for two weeks. Guede Films recruited his services in 1989, where he produced commercials for TLD, Kentucky Fried Chicken and Pizza Hut. In 1990, he produced the musical video musical Un amor como el mío (A love like mine) for Puerto Rican singer Lunna. It was during this era that Colberg directed 26 chapters of the local television comedy "No hay cama pa' tanta gente" which was transmitted through WIPR, Canal 6 in Puerto Rico. In 1996, the Government of Puerto Rico required his services for the production of "Terremoto en Puerto Rico" (Earthquake in Puerto Rico) a documentary which was distributed by Blockbuster Inc. In 1995, he directed and produced "Milagro en Yauco" (A miracle in Yauco), a Christmas story which was transmitted via Telemundo.

Amongst the movies he directed and co-wrote is Los Díaz de Doris (1999), a drama starring Cordelia González, Braulio Castillo, Jr., Raul Davila and Alba Raquel Barros. The drama deals with the problems that a divorced mother of three has to face in her daily life. Colberg also produced musical videos for the group LimiT XXI, Melina León and for Luis Fonsi. In 2001, Colberg directed Casos Inesperados, a series which treats social themes and which was broadcast locally by WAPA TV.

On March 18, 2010 Colberg released the film Aventura Verde (Green Adventure), which he created and co-produced with Puerto Rican actor Junior Alvarez. The story is about five children from three different families and the conflicts between them and their parents. It includes the emergence of magical characters in a mysterious forest during the night. Colberg's projects under development include a movie based on the life of Puerto Rican actor Braulio Castillo.

== Films ==
The list of films by Colberg include:

- Milagro en Yauco (1995)
- Los Díaz de Doris (1999–2000)
- Fire in the Soul (2002–2003)
- Aventura Verde (2010)

== See also ==
- List of Puerto Ricans
