= Néstor Rodulfo =

Puerto Rican actor

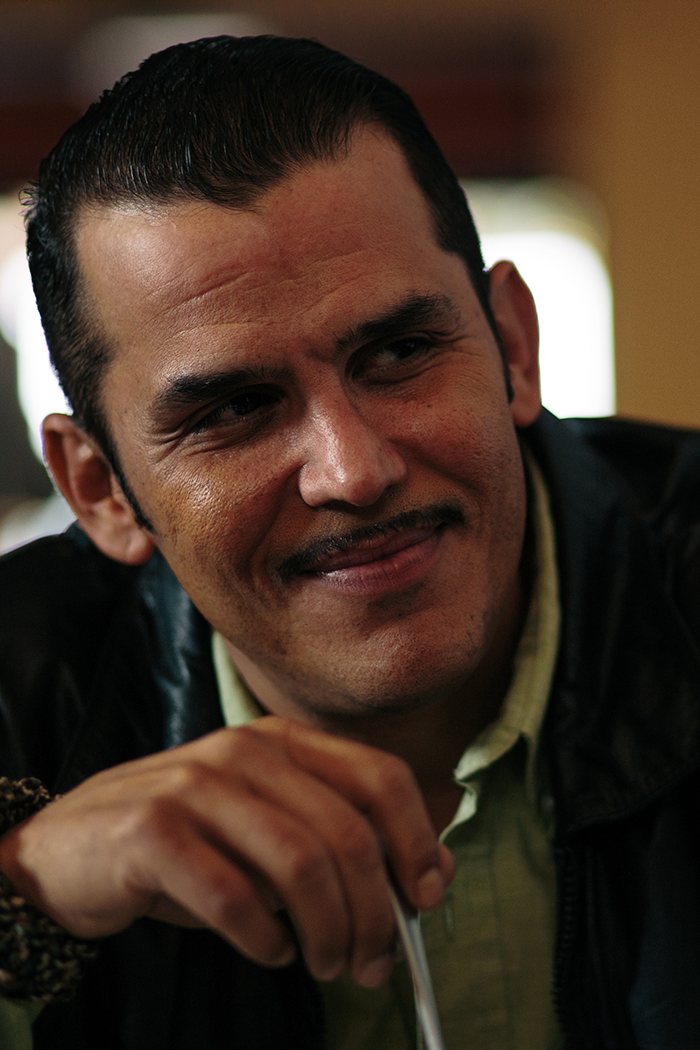
- Rodulfo as Diego Prieto in the Mexican web television series La Hermanda
- Born: 18 October 1972 (age 53); San Juan, Puerto Rico
- Education: University of Puerto Rico at Bayamón
- Years active: 1995–present

Néstor Rodulfo (born 18 October 1972) is a Puerto Rican actor, known for his roles in the Argos Comunicación and Telemundo productions. His first major role was in Rosa diamante playing Ramón Gómez. His second important role was in Amar a muerte playing El Alacrán. Rodulfo studied at the University of Puerto Rico at Bayamón, and in parallel to his studies at the university, he performed acting studies at the Performance Workshop established by Luz María Rondón and Herman O'Neill. Despite not standing out much in the field of film and television. He has made himself known for several plays of theaters in Puerto Rico and Mexico.

== Filmography ==
=== Film roles ===
| Year | Title | Roles | Notes |
|---|---|---|---|
| 1996 | Héroes de otra patria | John | |
| 1999 | Los Díaz de Doris | Police #1 | |
| 2005 | Animal | Yard Dog | |
| 2008 | Che: Part One | Miguel | |
| 2008 | Che: Part Two | Miguel | |
| 2010 | Hidalgo: La historia jamás contada | Marroquín | |
| 2014 | Verdades y mentiras | Carlos Rivera | |
| 2015 | Master of Death | Víctor Rosales | |
| 2016 | Macho | Technical | |
| 2019 | Celos | Mike | Short film |

=== Selected television roles ===
| Year | Title | Roles | Notes |
|---|---|---|---|
| 2008 | Al borde del deseo | Luis | |
| 2010 | Las Aparicio | Tomás Martínez | |
| 2011–2012 | El octavo mandamiento | Pablo Ortíz | |
| 2012–2013 | Rosa diamante | Ramón Gómez | |
| 2013 | Fortuna | Ernesto Villaurrutia | |
| 2014 | La impostora | Rubén Espinoza "El Tuerto" | 17 episodes |
| 2014 | Camelia la Texana | Octavio Franco | 26 episodes |
| 2015–2016 | El Señor de los Cielos | General Camilo Jaramillo | Recurring role (seasons 3–4); 27 episodes |
| 2016 | La Hermandad | Diego Prieto | Episode: "El regreso" |
| 2018 | Sr. Ávila | Oliverio | 3 episodes |
| 2018–2019 | Amar a muerte | El Alacrán | Series regular; 80 episodes |
| 2018 | Nicky Jam: El Ganador | Cuti | 5 episodes |
