= Carlos Esteban Fonseca =

Puerto Rican actor

Carlos Esteban (born in 1960) rose to fame while co-hosting the television game show Dame Un Break alongside Dagmar. Also famous for his portrayal of a broke down family man in the La Fiebre television movie saga.

His most famous role is in the 2005 film Cayo, which started a huge cult following in his native island of Puerto Rico.

Besides his work in local films and television shows, he has been known to participate in plays as well, most recently starring as Edipo in Edipo Rey, for which he received great reviews. (El Nuevo Dia, Oct. 2005)

== Filmography ==
1. Animal (2005) ... Big Dre
2. Cayo (2005) ... Ivan
3. La Fiebre 1 & 2 (2002) ... Gas Attendant
4. Undercurrent (1999) ... Detective Duarte
5. Tres destinos (1993) television series
6. Dame Un Break (1992–1996) television game show
