= Choco Orta =

Puerto Rican actress and singer

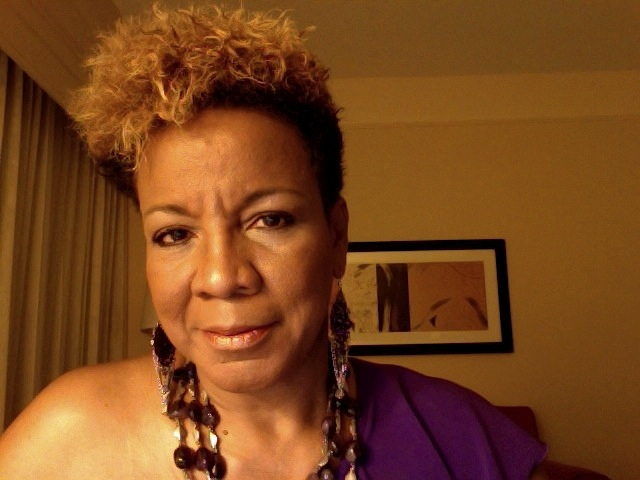
- Rhythm & Soul-Choco Orta-Salsa Diva
- Born: Virgen Milagros Orta Rodríguez; November 28, 1959 (age 66); Santurce, Puerto Rico
- Years active: 1970–present

Choco Orta (born Virgen Milagros Orta Rodriguez, November 28, 1959) is a Puerto Rican actress, latin, tropical and salsa singer, as well as percussionist, and dancer, born in Santurce, Puerto Rico.
