= Luis Gonzaga =

Puerto Rican actor (born 1979)

- Born: April 3, 1979 (age 47); Bayamón, Puerto Rico
- Education: Universidad de Puerto Rico
- Occupation: Actor, director
- Years active: 1998–present

Luis Gonzaga (born April 3, 1979) is a Puerto Rican actor best known for his work on the comedy troupe Teatro Breve as one of its founders and cast members, and also for his roles on Fast Five (2011), The Rum Diary (2011) and Maldeamores (2007).

== Early life ==
Luis was born on Bayamón, Puerto Rico, an industrial town located on the north of Puerto Rico. Growing up he was a big fan of cars and speed, and his initial contact with acting came during his senior year, when he enrolled in the acting class at school as he needed to choose an elective course and he chose that over Physical Education. After graduating high school, Luis applied to enter University of Puerto Rico's Drama School, but was initially rejected. He then entered Universidad del Sagrado Corazón and spent his freshman year there.

== Formation ==
Before the 1997 academic year, Luis asked UPR's then drama department director, Idalia Pérez Garay, to let him stay and take classes, although he wasn't actually enrolled at the School. After receiving the approval of professors such as Carola García, Pérez Garay decided to let him the entire 1997 year as an auditor in several classes and courses. Eventually, in 1998, he was accepted in the prestigious Teatro Rodante group of the drama school and subsequently into the university.

With Teatro Rodante he participated in such classics as Six Characters in Search of an Author and La Celestina, among others.

== Career as an actor ==
In 1999, he started his career in films and plays, and made his TV debut in the made-for-TV film El Día Menos Pensado. He appeared in Dirty Dancing: Havana Nights in 2004 as Arturo and later as a lunatic lover in the acclaimed Puerto Rican film Maldeamores in 2007.

Since, he's been in many movies such as Fast Five (2011), The Rum Diary (2011) and as a lead actor in the local film El Fondillo Maravilloso, for which he has received many nominations.

== Teatro Breve ==
He was a founding member of the group and has been a key part as a cast member and director all throughout its existence. He has participated as an actor or director in most of the troupe's efforts, including lead actor in two of the group's most popular plays: Santurcia and La Casa.

== Personal life ==
Luis has been a motor sports fan since childhood and is an amateur cyclist, having participated in many tours and endurance races. This hobby helped him to lose over 50 pounds and drastically changed his lifestyle.

== Filmography ==
=== Film ===
Year	Title	Role	Notes
2004	Dirty Dancing, Havana Nights	Arturo	
2007	Maldeamores	Miguel	
2009	Kabo & Platón	Walker	
2011	The Rum Diary		
2012	I am a director	Luis Gonzaga	
2015	El Fondillo Maravilloso	Chique Bonbón	
