= Amílcar Tirado =

Puerto Rican filmmaker (1922–2004)

- Born: April 9, 1922; Coamo, Puerto Rico
- Died: January 24, 2004 (aged 81); Santurce, Puerto Rico
- Occupation: Filmmaker
- Military career
- Allegiance: United States
- Branch: United States Army
- Rank: Corporal
- Conflicts: World War II

Amílcar Tirado Santiago (April 9, 1922 – January 24, 2004) was a Puerto Rican filmmaker active primarily during the 1950s and 1960s. Working for the Puerto Rican Division of Community Education in the Audiovisual Department, Tirado created socially-minded films, often using local jíbaros as actors.

== Biography ==
Amílcar Tirado was born in Coamo, Puerto Rico. Served in the United States Army during the World War II era. He received a bachelor's degree in theater from the University of Puerto Rico in 1944 and a master's degree in theater directing from Yale University in 1945. He worked as a consultant for Warner Bros. during the 1950s. He was involved in the Puerto Rican Division of Community Education from its outset and continued working with the division until 1965. Tirado taught at the University of Puerto Rico for a short time in 1965–1967, although he continued to be involved in Puerto Rican film production after this. He continued his education during the later half of his life and also taught at various universities. He died at Pavia Hospital in Santurce, Puerto Rico in 2004 after suffering with Alzheimer's disease. He was buried at the Puerto Rico National Cemetery in Bayamón, Puerto Rico.

== Career in cinema ==
Amílcar Tirado, and the division he worked for in general, was very prolific. He created over 50 productions throughout his career, although many were short educational films that have been lost. His most known films are El gallo pelón (1961), El Puente (1954) and Los Peloteros (1951). He worked with many other DIVEDCO artists on productions, including having posters made by famous Puerto Rican artists like Lorenzo Homer. His films draw comparison to Italian Neorealist films that also focused on everyday lower-class life, filming on location and using untrained actors.

== Filmography ==
| Year | Original title |
|---|---|
| 1951 | Los peloteros |
| 1952 | Una voz en la montaña |
| 1954 | El puente |
| 1956 | La buena herencia, El santero |
| 1961 | El gallo pelón |
| 1962 | La casa de un amigo |
