= Luz María Rondón =

Puerto Rican actress (born 1933)

- Born: Luz María Rondón; March 29, 1933 (age 92); Rio Piedras, Puerto Rico
- Occupations: Film and telenovela actress
- Known for: Yo Sé Que Mentía, Tanairí, Perfume de Gardenias
- Children: 1
- Family: son Carlos, others

Luz María Rondón (born March 29, 1933, in Rio Piedras, Puerto Rico) is a Puerto Rican actress and acting teacher.

== Early life ==
Rondón began her acting career in 1957, when she was 24.

== Acting career ==
She left acting in order to attend college, getting a bachelor's degree in teaching from the University of Puerto Rico. She also began raising a family, but tragedy soon arrived in her life: her youngest son, Carlos ("Carlitos"), was diagnosed by a doctor as having Leukemia. Carlitos soon died, an event that touched Rondón for the rest of her life (in 1987, she told a national newspaper, El Reportero, that, in her opinion, parents never recover (from a child's death) .

Carlitos' death inspired Rondón to return to the UPR, to study acting. Back at UPR, Rondón met Leopoldo Santiago Lavandero, a noted theater personality of the time. A few months later, Rondón debuted at the UPR theater's Romeo y Julieta (Romeo and Juliet) production.

Soon after, Rondón joined the "Teatro del Sesenta" theater company, a group of actors whose members also included, at one time or another, Gilda Haddock, Pedro Juan Texidor and Luis Oliva, among others.

Rondón enjoyed a fruitful theater career; acting in more than 100 plays and earning two Golden Laurel awards (the Puerto Rican theater's equivalent of the Tony Awards), one for her participation in 1979's Los Angeles Se Han Fatigado (The Angels Are Tired) and one for her work in 1980's Amor en el Caserio (Love At the Residencial). In 1982, her acting in a play named El Insolito Caso de Miss Piña Colada (The Strange Case of Miss Piña Colada) brought her critical praise from critics such as Ramón Figueroa Chapel of El Mundo, who called her a "señora actriz" (equivalent in Spanish language to "leading actress", or to "legendary actress" in American english) on that newspaper's 2 July 1982, edition.

Television success followed her theater acting success, as Rondón began acting in many Puerto Rican telenovelas. In 1978, Rondón was hired by canal 11 to work on a telenovela named Mi Querida Sylvia (My Beloved Sylvia), where she worked alongside main stars Marilyn Pupo and Daniel Lugo, as well as with Angela Meyer, Carmen Belen Richardson, Axel Anderson, Miguel Angel Suarez, Joffre Perez and many other notable Puerto Rican actors of the era. Despite its all-star cast, this telenovela was, however, a critical and ratings failure.

Rondón then acted in a telenovela named Sabel, before moving to canal 4, to act in a telenovela that is considered by fans and critics a classic of Puerto Rican television: Yo Se Que Mentia (I Know He Lied), alongside Argentina's Daniel Guerrero and Puerto Rico's Iris Chacon and a young Adamari Lopez. That show was on the air during 1982. Rondón during the 1980s participated in many other telenovelas, many at canal 2, such as Coralito, Laura Guzman, culpable (Laura Guzman: Guilty!), the Puerto Rican television classic Tanairi, De que Color, es el Amor? (What Color is Love?) Preciosa (Precious, not to be confused with an American film of the same name) and Ave de Paso (Bird of Passage). She then retired from acting in television for a period, due, in part, to Puerto Rican television stations' lowering their local telenovela production numbers beginning in the 1990s.

In 1988, Rondón made her comedy debut, as she participated, alongside Raul Davila and fellow "Teatro del Sesenta" alumni Luis Oliva, among others, in a canal 4 show that became a mega-hit in Puerto Rico, Carmelo y Punto, playing a woman who was deeply-and hopelessly-in love with Davila's titular character of "Carmelo".

In 2000, Rondón made a one-off comeback to the world of telenovelas, acting in Cuando Despierta el Amor (When Love Awakens), which turned out to be the last telenovela she participated in.

During 2021, Rondón was the main star in a movie named Perfume de Gardenias, where she characterized "Isabel". That film was shown in, among others, the Tribeca Film Festival in the United States.

== Acting teacher ==
During 1990, Rondón, along with Herman O' Neill (another popular Puerto Rican actor of the era), opened an acting school.

== See also ==
- List of Puerto Ricans
- Vivir Para Ti - another show in which Rondón acted
