= Dean Zayas =

Puerto Rican actor, director, and playwright (1938–2022)

- Born: Dean Zayas Pereira; October 17, 1938; Caguas, Puerto Rico
- Died: February 3, 2022 (aged 83); Bayamón, Puerto Rico
- Known for: Teatro del Sesenta, Teatro Sylvia Rexach, Teatro Rodante Universitario

Dean Zayas Pereira (October 17, 1938 – February 3, 2022) was a Puerto Rican actor, director, playwright, author, poet, dramatic arts professor, and television show host. One of Puerto Rico's most prolific directors, he directed some of the best known Puerto Rican telenovelas, such as Cristina Bazán, Coralito, and Tanairi, among many others. Zayas served as chair of the University of Puerto Rico, Río Piedras Campus Department of Drama and the University's Traveling Theatre (Teatro Rodante Universitario) until 2014. He also served as director of the Theatre Division of the Instituto de Cultura Puertorriqueña.

== Biography ==
Dean Zayas was born in Barrio Cañas in Caguas, Puerto Rico. His father was a farmer who would spend a lot of hours reading farming books, and Zayas himself became an avid reader. In an interview, Zayas remarked that he exhibited a vivid imagination which facilitated the creation of imaginary friends; he would talk to himself while thinking he was talking to someone else. His extensive reading and introspective conversations evolved into the development of elaborate stories involving himself and his imaginary friends. He transformed those stories into plays that he would perform for his family. By the time he reached the fifth grade, his father took him to a local radio station where he had the opportunity to participate in a farming-themed radio program.

Zayas Pereira's sister helped him secure a spot in a play named La Zapatera Prodigiosa, which had been written by Federico García Lorca, before he turned 11 years old. Soon after his mother's death, he moved to New Jersey, where he attended junior high school and high school. Upon graduating, he received a scholarship to study at Princeton University, but dropped out shortly after starting. He stated that, "College bored me because it wasn't something that I wanted to do," and with that mindset, he began working in the advertising department at a private company in NYC while also performing in Broadway shows.

After visiting his father in Puerto Rico during the 1960s, Zayas was persuaded to resume his academic pursuits and eventually enrolled at the University of Puerto Rico in Río Piedras to study Theatre, graduating in 1963. He earned an MA in Theatre Education from New York University in 1965. Zayas became a drama professor at the Río Piedras Campus in 1969 after deciding that he preferred teaching and directing to acting.

Eventually, Dean Zayas was hired as a director by Telemundo Puerto Rico, where his directorial debut came with the 1980s telenovela "El Idolo", which starred Venezuelan actor Jose Luis Rodríguez and Cuban-Puerto Rican actress Marilyn Pupo. He then directed "Fue Sin Querer" in 1982 and "Coralito" in 1983, where he directed actors such as Sully Díaz, Braulio Castillo, hijo, Claribel Medina, and Mexican actor Salvador Pineda. In 1985, he directed "Tanairi" with Juan Ferrara as the male lead and Von Marie Mendez as the female lead. Furthermore, he directed "Karina Montaner" in 1989 and "Aventurera" in 1990, marking his final television directing projects. Afterward, he chose to focus on theatre productions and his role as an acting teacher instead.

He dedicated his life to the education of the performing arts, training the country's foremost actors and directors over the past five decades. His significant academic contributions to the UPR's Drama Department facilitated its remarkable development and encompassed all areas of theatrical discipline, including courses in acting, directing, diction, makeup, stage assistance, as well as theater history and theory. He also served as director of the University’s Rodante Theatre, representing the UPR and Puerto Rico at various international festivals, including the “Spanish Golden Age Theatre Festival” in El Paso, Texas; Mexico; the Dominican Republic; and Spain, with performances in Santiago de Compostela, Murcia, and Almagro in La Mancha. In July 2007, he traveled with the Rodante Theatre along the Vía de la Plata as part of the “Las huellas de La Barraca” project, which sponsored by the “Sociedad Estatal de Conmemoraciones Culturales” of Spain.

He was invited as a lecturer at various universities within and outside Puerto Rico. In 1995, he directed the “Aula de Teatro” at the University of Murcia in Spain. Internationally, he was recognized as a leading specialist in Spanish Golden Age Theatre.

On a professional level, Zayas achieved notoriety as the founder and director of the Teatro del Sesenta and Teatro Sylvia Rexach theatre companies, producing nearly all of its shows from 1963 to 1974.

On October 5, 2016, the University of Puerto Rico awarded Dean an honorary degree. He retired from teaching in 2019.

== Television host ==
In 2001, Zayas was hired by WIPR channel 6, the Puerto Rican government's educational television channel, to host "Estudio Actoral", a Puerto Rican version of Inside the Actors Studio. Zayas interviewed stars such as Lin-Manuel Miranda and Edward James Olmos, whom he recalled as one of his most memorable interviews and as an "intelligent, human, and sincere man".

== Death ==
In his later years, Zayas experienced significant health issues related to back problems. On February 3, 2022, he died at the age of 83 in an assisted living facility located in Bayamón.

== Biographical book ==
In 2014, Zayas published an autobiography entitled Ese no es nadie ("That One is no One"). The title is derived from an incident that Zayas found humorous, which occurred when he arrived one day at the Telemundo Puerto Rico parking lot. Upon observing him inside his vehicle, a celebrity spotter remarked, "ese no es nadie," implying that she considered Zayas to be an inconsequential individual. Zayas overheard the comment, laughed to himself, and decided that would be the title of his book.

== See also ==
- List of Puerto Ricans
- Myrna Casas - another Puerto Rican playwright
