= Alba Raquel Barros =

Puerto Rican actress

- Born: 14 December 1952 (age 72); Santurce, Puerto Rico
- Occupation(s): actress, comedian, dancer

Alba Raquel Barros (born 14 December 1952 in Santurce, Puerto Rico) is an actress, comedian, and dancer. She is better known for her acting career, and she has won many national awards for her work, both in the television and theatrical fields.

== Biography ==
Barros participated in a rendition of Tennessee Williams' A Streetcar Named Desire as a student at the University of Puerto Rico (UPR).

Barros began her rise to fame as a telenovela actress in Puerto Rico's channel 2 during the 1970s. She participated in some of that channel's most famous soap operas.

By the early 1980s, she had moved to WAPA-TV, where she acted in some of that channel's most famous shows, including 1982's soap, Yo Sé Que Mentía (I know he was lying), with Iris Chacón, the mini series, Las Divorciadas, (The Divorced Women), with Sonia Noemí and Maribella Garcia, as well as 1984's sitcom, Barrio Cuatro Calles. In the latter comedy she played a Puerto Rican girl who had been born in New York City therefore she used an Americanized, or Nuyorican, accent. She played the wife of Miguel Ángel Álvarez, who played a bakery owner. They played opposite legendary Cuban actor Pucho Fernández and Yasmín Mejías.

She has participated at the theatrical versions of many of Latin America's most famous novels, including La Carreta, Orinoco, La Clase del 69 and others.

The famous Chilean show host and producer, Don Francisco has invited Barros many times to his Univision show Sábado Gigante. Barros has participated as a comedian a number of times on that television show.

Barros' acting career has not been limited to television and theater, however, as she has participated in a number of Puerto Rico's most important productions of all times, including Nicolas y los demas (Nicholas and the others), directed by and starred Jacobo Morales, Héroes de Otra Patria (Heroes for Another Nation, which protested the participation of Puerto Ricans in the United States military, particularly during the Vietnam War era), and Los Diaz de Doris.

In 2002, Barros moved to Venezuela to act there, after being signed by Venevision. She appeared in Ángel Rebelde as Simona Ramirez.

In 2008, she acted in Telemundo's El Rostro de Analía where she played Dionisia Valdez.

In 2010, she acted in Telemundo's Alguien Te Mira where she played Yoyita.

== Awards ==
These are some of the awards Barros has received over the years:

- Outstanding comedy actress of the year (Puerto Rico, 1985)
- Comedian of the year (Puerto Rico, 1986)
- Best female actress (Puerto Rico, 1986)
- Best soap opera starring role (Puerto Rico, 1987)
- Best actress (Puerto Rico, 1988)
- Best actress in a supporting role, Critics Circle Award Theater of Puerto Rico (Puerto Rico, 1990)

== Works ==
List of appearances in film, stage, and television
Title	type	Year	Role	Notes
Streetcar named Desire	play	1972	Stella Kowalski	University of Puerto Rico production
La Carreta	play	1979	Lydia	
El ídolo	telenovela	1980		WKAQ-TV series starred José Luis Rodríguez
Yo Sé Que Mentía	telenovela	1982		
Las Divorciadas	miniseries	1984		
Barrio Cuatro Calles	sitcom	1984		
Padres de hoy	miniseries	1985		
Nicolás y Los Demás (An ordinary Day)	film	1986	María	Directed by and starred Jacobo Morales
Camino Negro	play	1987	Myrna	Centro de Bellas Artes production
Hemingway	miniseries	1988		
Tres destinos	telenovela	1993		Genie Montalvo also appeared
Orinoco	play	1993	Mina	play by Emilio Carballido performed at Centro de Bellas Artes
El Callejón de los Cuernos	television special	1998		WAPA-TV
Nueva Yol 3	film	1997		
La Clase del 69	play	1997	Gloria	Centro de Bellas Artes production
Esperando al Italiano	play	1997		Centro de Bellas Artes production
Héroes de Otra Patria	film	1998	Pura Torres	
Los Díaz de Doris	film	1999	Myrna	
Entre los Dioses del Desprecio	film	2000		
Second Honeymoon	television film	2001	Louisa	
El Rompecabezas	film	2002		
A 2.50 la Cuba Libre	play	2002		Ibrahim Guerra play appeared in Miami (with Hoy Como Ayer) and in New York
Ángel Rebelde	telenovela	2004	Simona Ramirez	
Habla y Habla	television documentary	2006	self	
El Rostro de Analía	telenovela	2008–2009	Dionisia Valdez	
One Hot Summer	television film	2009	Elder Lady 1	
Alguien Te Mira	telenovela	2010	Yoyita	
En Otra Piel	telenovela	2014	Doña Lupe	

== See also ==
- List of Puerto Ricans
