= Carlos Muñiz Varela =

Cuban resident of Puerto Rico who was murdered

- Born: August 10, 1953; Colón, Cuba
- Died: April 28, 1979 (aged 25); Guaynabo, Puerto Rico
- Cause of death: Ballistic trauma
- Occupation: Reporter
- Known for: Victim of an unsolved murder Supporter of pro-Puerto Rican independence movements

Carlos Muñiz Varela (August 10, 1953 – April 28, 1979) was a Cuban national, long resident of Puerto Rico, who was murdered under suspicious circumstances in 1979. Muñiz Varela was an outspoken backer of successive Puerto Rican independence movements.

== Biography ==
Muñiz Varela was born in Cuba. When he was nine years old, he moved from Cuba together with his mother and sister to live in Puerto Rico.

Muñiz Varela received his primary and secondary education in Puerto Rico and in 1973, he formed the Movimiento Socialista Popular, a university students pro-independence group.

In 1974, Muñiz Varela joined the staff of Areito magazine, a pro-Puerto Rican independence publication. In 1977, Muñiz Varela returned to Cuba, this time as a reporter for Areito, and there, he interviewed various political leaders.

Late in the 1970s, Muñiz Varela and a business associate opened a travel agency named Varadero Travel in Bayamon, near San Juan. This agency aimed at making traveling between Puerto Rico and Cuba, and back, easier for Cuban exiles in Puerto Rico.

On December 21, 1978, Muñiz Varela and 90 other Cubans flew to Cuba in what is believed to be the first time since the Cuban revolution that a group of Cubans visited the island from Puerto Rico. During this trip, Muñiz met Edith Cabrera, a divorced TV soap opera actress, and they were soon romantically involved, even though she knew that he was married. In a court-ordered deposition,

Cabrera stated that their romance lasted until his death and that Muñiz had proposed marriage to her since he was separated from his wife Pilar Perez Negron. Two weeks before his death, Muñiz called Cabrera from Havana and asked her to take petty cash from the travel agency and rent a furnished studio apartment for him in the Villamar neighborhood of Isla Verde.

== Death ==
Muñiz Varela was murdered on April 28, 1979, as he was driving to his mother's house in Guaynabo, a city that borders Bayamon, San Juan, and Caguas. He received two shots, one in the chest near his left shoulder and another on the temple, the latter one of which exited his head towards his left ear. The mortally wounded Muñiz Varela was taken to the Centro Medico hospital. When his lover Edith Cabrera went there to see him, his friends told her to leave "to avoid problems" because the wife Pilar Perez Negron was present. When Cabrera attended the burial at the cemetery she was the last in the crowd.

A group which called itself "Comando Cero" took credit for the assassination but Muñiz Varela's murder was never solved. The investigation into his death was given renewed attention under the mandate of Wanda Vázquez Garced, the governor of Puerto Rico in 2019. He was buried at the Capital Municipal Cemetery in Río Piedras, Puerto Rico.

== Allegations ==
Muñiz Varela's death prompted numerous allegations, both political and personal. A local Puerto Rican newspaper, the PNP backed "La Crónica", declared Muñiz Varela to be a drug-dealing communist in April 1984.

On the other hand, documents that were declassified by the FBI in 2012 linked Cuban exile Julio Labatud, also known as "Julito Labatud", as being involved in the murder of Muñiz Varela. Labatud, who lived in Puerto Rico for 40 years, died in 2007 of cancer.

In February 2025, U.S. Representative Nydia Velázquez and Alexandria Ocasio-Cortés, asked the Central Intelligence Agency (CIA) and the Federal Bureau of Investigation (FBI), to declassify the existing documentation in the case of Muñiz Varela. The same month, the Senate of Puerto Rico approved a resolution requesting the same information.

== Personal ==
Muñiz Varela was married twice. He had a son, Carlos Muñiz Perez (Carlos Muñiz Jr.), and a daughter, Yamaira Muñiz Perez. Both were born from his union with Pilar Perez.

== See also ==
- Cerro Maravilla murders
- Filiberto Ojeda Rios
- List of Puerto Ricans
- List of unsolved murders (1900–1979)

=== Fellow Cuban expatriates in Puerto Rico ===
- Luis Aguad Jorge
- Marilyn Pupo
- Nobel Vega
- Rosaura Andreu
- Ofelia D'Acosta
