= Manolo Urquiza =

Cuban-born, Puerto Rican television personality

Manuel Fernández Urquiza (January 29, 1920 – December 30, 1987), more commonly known as Manolo Urquiza, was a Cuban-born media personality whose career spanned over three decades. He developed his career as a radio announcer, public relations officer and television presenter, both in his native Cuba and in Puerto Rico, where he became a motion picture presenter on Puerto Rican television.

== Career ==
=== In Cuba ===
Born on January 29, 1920, in Trinidad, Cuba, to Jacobo Fernandez (a Spanish immigrant to Cuba who opened the very successful Ce-ci-Bon Bakery in Havana) and Julieta Urquiza. Manolo had two sisters, Flora Fernandez (deceased) and Francisca (Paquita) Fernandez (Santana)(deceased).

Early in his career, Fernández Urquiza dropped his parental surname (Fernández, a rather common one in Cuba) in favor of the relatively more exotic Urquiza (his mother's) for a stage name. Urquiza's career as a radio announcer in Cuba spanned over 15 years.

According to article published in Cubarte Magazine by Mayra Cue Sierra in 2007 (attached) https://web.archive.org/web/20120605184037/http://www.cubarte.cult.cu/periodico/columnas/tv-y-cultura/union-radio-60-anos-surge-la-cadena-noticiosa-final/6/5720.html

Manuel Fernández Urquiza (9) was appointed as head of the new Organization, in the artistic and commercial field, who had already proven his talent and experience in Havana Radio, especially for his work in RHC Cadena Azul, from its first stage and that the press of the time recognized: "He is the man for the position." Here he planned to set up a Department of Promotion and Publicity in this station.

(-Leyend) Manuel Fernández Urquiza (9) In 1951, from Publicidad Méndez, he was in charge of the production of "La Familia Pilón", an emblematic program that appeared on Cuban Radio during the 1940s. An activity that he also extended to other projects. 1952. He obtained the UCTRD (Union of Daily Radio and Television Critics) award, as the most outstanding presenter. In 1953 he left this job where he had so many triumphs to occupy the position of Sales Manager at CMQ TV, (while Arturo Chabau was at the CMQ Circuit). He was appointed assistant administrator of the Program Department of CMQ and CMQ TV. In May of that year, as Head of Sales for CMQ TV, he traveled to the US for the Advertising Export Association Convention and took the opportunity to meet NBC offices and visit some advertising agencies. On December 31, 1954, he left the position of CMQ TV Sales Manager to accept the Vice Presidency of Publicitaria Siboney, maintaining cordial relations with CMQ. Manolo Reyes replaced him.

By sheer coincidence, Urquiza was the very first live human being ever shown on Cuban television when broadcasts started in 1948. As the main press officer for then-president Carlos Prío Socarrás, Urquiza was asked to introduce the country's president, who then gave an opening message for the inaugural broadcast.

=== In Puerto Rico ===
After the events of the Cuban Revolution, Urquiza exiled to Puerto Rico in the early 1960s. He worked in advertising, starting with United Promotors with Juan Luis Marquez. Urquiza was the account executive for Revlon Cosmetics, Renault and Ron Llave, among many others. Later on, he joined Premier Maldonado in a new advertising agency, Premier Maldonado Associates, bringing his main clients with him to this agency. After some very successful years in the advertising field, Manolo formed a production company with fellow Cuban TV producer Tony Chiroldes, purchasing air time in the newly established WRIK-TV, also known as Rikavision, Canal 7. After many years not appearing in television, Manolo came back in front of the TV cameras with his Cine del Hogar which became an overnight success. After his partnership with Mr. Chiroldes ended, United Artists -the owners of Rikavision- offered Manolo to remain at the station with his nightly show and also offered him the position of director of public relations and advertising for the station.

In association with United Artists, Manolo was able to make the necessary connections to bring various celebrities to the island and to his show. The first celebrity to be interviewed by Manolo was Rita Moreno. Many others followed, including Elliott Gould, Michael Caine, Paula Prentiss and Richard Benjamin, Jean-Pierre Aumont, Silvia Pinal and Enrique Guzman from Mexico and the Grandmother of Mexican Cinema, Miss Sara Garcia. Eventually, Manolo was invited to travel to Hollywood and attend the Academy Awards Ceremony several times. Manolo was also invited to movie sets and press junkets where he would spend a week at a time on different movie sets with directors and actors. He spent a week in New Orleans during the filming of Live and Let Die, Roger Moore's first James Bond movie.

He then was offered to move his show to WKAQ-TV (Telemundo) and was also offered the position of vice-president of public relations and communications for the station. Manolo, besides continuing with his nightly show, now renamed Telecine de la Noche became the face and voice of Telemundo besides fulfilling his executive duties and continuing his travels and interviewing celebrities.

As to provide appropriate background comments to the films presented in each broadcast, Urquiza asked film critic Juan Gerard to research and co-produce. He eventually travelled to Hollywood, Las Vegas and Cannes, France, to interview various film personalities.

Manolo once interviewed Sophia Loren. He traveled to New York City to interview her at the Pierre Hotel. At the end of the interview Manolo asked Ms. Loren for a kiss and to his surprise, she held his face with both arms and kissed him on the lips. . . Manolo and Sofia continued a friendly relationship through the years. She later traveled to Puerto Rico to promote her new line of glasses and contacted Manolo and met with him and Manolo's wife Conchita Urquiza (1932–1997), an ex Revlon spokesperson.

Manolo retired from his duties in Telemundo in June 1987 and died in December 1987. Telemundo honored Manolo with a TV Special where various local celebrities and friends of the family spoke about Mr. Urquiza and his career and personal life. Conchita his wife and constant companion died in April 1997.

== See also ==
- List of Cubans
- List of Puerto Ricans
- Ofelia D'Acosta - another Cuban exile to Puerto Rico
- Marilyn Pupo - another Cuban exile in Puerto Rico
- Nobel Vega - another Cuban exile in Puerto Rico
- Raminor martinez - another Cuban exile in Puerto Rico
- Luis Aguad Jorge - another Cuban exile in Puerto Rico
