= Ivette Rodriguez =

Puerto Rican actress, singer, writer, author and television journalist

- Born: July 28, 1954 (age 71); San Juan, Puerto Rico
- Occupations: Actress, singer, author, television journalist
- Years active: 1970s–present
- Spouse: Frank Marrero (divorced)
- Children: 2 (Kiriel Marrero, Anna Marrero)

Ivette Rodriguez (born 28 July 1954 in San Juan, Puerto Rico) is a well known Puerto Rican actress, singer and author.

== Career ==
Rodriguez's acting career took off in 1981, when she was hired by canal 4, to participate in a telenovela named "Yo Se Que Mentia" ("I Know He was Lying"), where she played "Fanny", acting alongside Daniel Guerrero and Iris Chacon.

Rodriguez acted in a film when she was hired to participate in 1994's "Linda Sara", where she collaborated with Jacobo Morales and also with Raul Davila, in addition to Dayanara Torres, Chayanne, Daniel Lugo and many other noted actors and actresses.

== Later career ==
Six years later, during 2000, she worked alongside Johanna Rosaly, Marilyn Pupo, Alba Nydia Diaz and Gladys Rodriguez (no relation) in a play named "Entre Mujeres" ("Among Women").

Entering the 21st. century, Rodriguez semi-retired from the show business world to concentrate on motherhood. In 2011, however, she returned briefly to acting, when she once again played Edith Piaf in the return of "Piaf: El Musical", which restarted on 7 October of that year at Centro de Bellas Artes.

in 2013, Rodriguez inaugurated an interactive therapies program for women named "Mujer: Tu Vida es Ahora!" ("Woman: Your Life is Now!"), at San Juan's Radisson Ambassador hotel. She declared at the time that "(She had) traveled to a lot of countries and (she had) found that a common denominator among women is low self-esteem. And not only that, but the fact (is) that women postpone their dreams (to take care of) their children and husbands".

== Book ==
During 2014, Rodriguez wrote and published a book, which she titled "Cuentos de tu Loca: Mensajes de tu Sabia: Estrategias Para Amarte y ser Feliz Ahora" ("Stories by Your Crazy Woman: Messages by Your Smart Woman: Strategies to Love Yourself and Being Happy Right Now").

== Personal life ==
Rodriguez was once involved in a relationship which she later described as "toxic".

Rodriguez was once married to a man named Efraín Marrero. The pair later divorced.

With Marrero, Rodriguez adopted two children from Russia, son Kiriel and daughter Anya.

== See also ==
- List of Puerto Ricans
