= Ofelia D'Acosta =

Cuban-Ouerto Rican actress (1922–2011)

- Born: February 9, 1922; Havana, Cuba
- Died: October 1, 2011 (age 89); Guaynabo, Puerto Rico
- Occupation: Television actress
- Notable credit(s): Coralito, Tanairi
- Spouse: Tino Acosta (1949-his death)
- Children: 2 (Ofelia Acosta, Jorge Acosta)

Ofelia D'Acosta née Martinez (9 February 1922 in Havana, Cuba – 1 October 2011 in Guaynabo, Puerto Rico) was a Cuban–Puerto Rican actress. She was known in Puerto Rico for her participation in theater, film and telenovelas (a type of soap opera popular on Latin American television markets).

== Early life ==
Born Ofelia Martinez in Havana, Cuba, she met Cuban actor Tino Acosta, five years her junior, when they were both in their 20s. The pair married in 1949. D'Acosta was 27 and her husband was 22 at that time. D'Acosta adopted her husband's last name, adding a D' in front of it, to imply she was his (because in Spanish language, the letter D sounds like the Spanish word de when pronounced, and "de" in Spanish means "from" or "of").

== Career ==
D'Acosta debuted as a radionovela actress in her native Cuba in 1949. She acted on shows carried by "Cadena Azul" and by "CMQ" radio stations. Her first major break came as a leading actress in a radionovela named "Cuando La Hija es Una Rival" ("When Your Daughter is Your Enemy"), which was played on the "Radio Progreso" station in Cuba. She also participated in a radio series named "Heroes de la Justicia" ("Justice Heroes"). Her costars at the time in those series included Tino Acosta as well as Raymond Oliva and Guillermo de Cun. Soon afterwards, she and Tino Acosta got married.

As a consequence of the late 1950s Cuban Revolution by Fidel Castro, Ernesto Guevara and others, D'Acosta and her husband Tino decided to move to Puerto Rico, where at first things were hard for the couple; D'Acosta had to become a saleswoman to make ends meet, walking around neighborhoods, selling Romper Room toys from house to house to make ends meet.

Due in part to the fact that her husband Tino initially found success as an actor in Puerto Rico during the mid-1960s, D'Acosta finally began acting in their new country. One of the first telenovelas where she acted at in Puerto Rico was Telemundo Canal 2's "Esclavos del Rencor" ("Slaves of Resentment") in which she was the leading actress.

Later on, D'Acosta participated in a Puerto Rican telenovela version of "Cuando La Hija es Una Rival", which this time was led by the German-Puerto Rican actor Axel Anderson and by Puerto Rican actress Camille Carrion; through the late 1970s and the 1980s, she became a prolific television actress in Puerto Rico, also being cast for roles in, among others, "La Sombra de Belinda" ("Belinda's Shadow"), the classic "Coralito" alongside Salvador Pineda and Sully Diaz (as "Ceferina") "Preciosa" (as "Flor"), "Milly" (in which she played a nun, "Sor Teresa"), the classic "Tanairi", where she acted as villain "Emperatriz" oppose Juan Ferrara and Von Marie Mendez, and "Escandalo" ("Scandal", alongside Andres Garcia, Charityn and Iris Chacon).

=== Tino Acosta Productions ===
Tino Acosta formed a production company named Tino Acosta Productions in 1979. The company included a dramatic arts school.

In 1986, Tino Acosta died, and Ofelia D'Acosta took over the company's dramatic arts school, renaming it the "Academia de Arte Ofelia D'Acosta". Many well known Puerto Rican actors have studied there, including Luisa de los Rios, Luis Raul, Jerry Seguarra and others.

=== Theater ===
D'Acosta was also a prolific theater actress; among other plays, she acted in "Cancion de Septiembre" ("September Song"), "Mujeres" ("Women") and "Recuerdos de Tulipa" ("Memories from the Fire"). She toured across Puerto Rico with "September Song".

=== Film ===
D'Acosta acted in 16 Puerto Rican film productions.

== Political views ==
D'Acosta was a fervent believer in statehood (with the United States) for Puerto Rico, but she greatly opposed Puerto Rican governor Luis Fortuno, which caused her to move to Miami, Florida, when she was 86 years old.

The Puerto Rican Statehood Party tried to get her involved in politics in Carolina, Puerto Rico, but she declined.

She was also strictly against Fidel and Raul Castro in Cuba and was an anti-communist.

About her love for Puerto Rico, she declared that she was a "statehood backer and (she desired) for Puerto Rico the same as (she did) for Cuba. I love Puerto Rico and when i die I want to be buried at El Yunque. But I said if Fortuno wins (the 2008 Puerto Rican general election) I would leave, and I am leaving. He is a wolf in sheep's clothing. A man who lies with extreme ease. He is not a statehood supporter. He was away for four years and all he could say afterwards is there is no place for Puerto Rican statehood. Having to leave hurts, but there is no turning back (her decision to)", she once declared to Primera Hora newspaper of Puerto Rico.

== Personal life and death ==
D'Acosta had a daughter, also named Ofelia, who has a learning disability. Her daughter moved with her to Miami.

She also had a son, Jorge Acosta.

She died early on the morning of 1 October 2011, after suffering s stroke. She had returned to Puerto Rico and was living at a hospice in Guaynabo.

== Reactions to her death ==
In spite of her views about governor Fortuno, he ordered Puerto Rican flags to be flown at half mast on the day she died.

== See also ==
- List of Cubans
- List of Puerto Ricans
- Ramiro Martinez – another Cuban-Puerto Rican personality who lived in Guaynabo
- Marilyn Pupo – another Cuban-Puerto Rican actress
