= Al borde del deseo =

Puerto Rican television series

- Rodolfo Jiménez, Cordelia Gonzalez and Braulio Castillo, hijo
- Genre: Drama; Action
- Created by: Vicente Castro (Original Story "Las Infieles")
- Starring: Cordelia González; Rodolfo Jiménez; Braulio Castillo, hijo Sully Díaz; Joemy Blanco; Yvonne Caro; Linnette Torres; Tensy Ann Vela; Carlos Esteban Fonseca; Jerry Segarra; Nashalí Enchautegui
- Composers: Vicente Castro; Myrna Casas; Jorge Rodríguez; Luis Carlos Robles; Melina León (Musical Theme)
- Country of origin: Puerto Rico
- Original language: Spanish
- No. of seasons: 1
- No. of episodes: 26

Production
- Executive producers: Vicente Castro; Jorge Luis Ramos
- Production location: San Juan, Puerto Rico
- Running time: 60 mins.

Original release
- Network: WAPA-TV; WAPA America
- Release: October 29, 2008 – May 2, 2009

Al Borde del Deseo was a Puerto Rican TV series that was aired in WAPA-TV in Puerto Rico and in United States in WAPA America about the true story of passionate women who share their experiences of love and disaffection in a modern world, struggling to enjoy an economic and professional position similar to that of men. They are women of different social classes, values and lifestyles opposites. Women who go through life trying to find happiness in a drama-laden comedy, that we are unveiling their aspirations, privacy, hopes, and of course their shenanigans. Women, who learn late in their life, to enjoy an independent life, ready to claim, what belongs to them. It is the story of women in common, not trying to be bigger than life itself but on the contrary, reflect the daily life of women working and struggling to achieve something better than what life has led them. Stories of women, torn from life itself. Stories of homes in the conflict, of lies, of fiery passions and above all of that unfortunate habit of human beings: infidelity.

The series finished production with a total of 26 episodes. The first episode was on October 29, 2008, and the last episode was on May 2, 2009.

== Characters ==
Sofía (Cordelia González)

Sofía is a mature woman, sexy and desired, who's going through the dramatic process of divorce. There has only been only one man in her life, her obsessed ex-husband Augusto, who insists on retaining her at his side. Their children, Diana and Kenny, are what she loves most in her life. Sofía owns an art gallery. Now she will meet Dario, an artist, a dreamer, a great father, but a younger man to whom she will fall in love with, without even imagining. This love will be hampered by the prejudice of Augusto, while at the same time facing the seduction of her own daughter, Diana, who has set her sights on conquering Dario.

Cecilia (Sully Díaz)

Cecilia is a middle-class woman, married and apparently happy, but tormented because her husband is a soldier serving in the War in Iraq. But her life is about to be turned inside out when a forbidden love enters her life. A love that will test the limits of the strength of her marriage and that will endanger her life and that of her daughters when her husband returns from the war and discovers that her wife's lover is his own sister.

Estela (Linnette Torres)

Estela is a retired actress and model who wants to change the life as "living doll" she has at home by returning to television, the media she belonged to before getting married. In her attempt to recover the time lost she will discover that it has not gone in vain and life is demanding its due. She is a sexy and funny woman who seems seductive when the reality is quite the opposite. The extroverted Estela hides a woman repressed and completely faithful. Her world will collapse when her long-awaited television program gets canceled amidst a huge scandal. This, coupled with an empty married life with an unfaithful scoundrel of a husband, will make Estela seek refuge in alcohol.

Nilsa (Yvonne Caro Caro)

Nilsa is a woman who is unhappy and tired of her marriage. Her highest aspiration is to have a child. She married to have children and start a family, but her husband, who also scorns her, has different priorities. Being a passionate and desperate woman, she will seek refuge in an infidelity with a younger man, who works for a living. She will find a man that will make her feel all the pleasures she longs for, and also give her what she wants the most: a son. The dilemma will present itself when Nilsa must decide who should be the child's father.

Primitiva (Tensy-Ann Vela)

Primitiva is a woman of modest means who is determined to improve her circumstances. Although she is not considered conventionally attractive, she is intelligent and resourceful. Driven by ambition and a desire for love, she is willing to take extreme measures to achieve her goals.

Lissette (Nashali Enchautegui)

Sister of Cecilia's husband, and aunt to their children, she has grown to love her Sister-in-Law to the point that she will take the chance to see how far she can go while her brother fights for his life and country in the Middle East. More than a forbidden love, it is treason against her own flesh and blood, something that could cost them all dearly.

Diana (Joemy Blanco)

Diana is the youngest in the group. Eldest daughter of Sofia, she suffers from a bipolar condition that upsets the lives of her mother Sofia, and all those around her. Without knowing, and afterward without caring, she will become rival to her own mother for the love of one man.

== Cast ==
Main Cast (in credit order)

- Cordelia González as Sofía
- Sully Díaz as Cecilia
- Linnette Torres as Estela
- Yvonne Caro Caro as Nilsa Ruiz
- Tensy-Ann Vela as Primitiva "Primi" Castrillo
- Rodolfo Jiménez as Darío García
- Braulio Castillo, hijo as Augusto Linares
- Joemy "Jo" Blanco as Diana Linares
- Carlos Esteban Fonseca as José Luis
- Jerry Segarra as Logan
- Nashalí Enchautegui as Lissette
- Jonathan Cardenales as Chuck

Young Cast

- Fernando Tarrazo as Kenny Linares (Sofia's son)
- Joshua Rosado as Dylan (Kenny's friend)
- Lorena Franco as Lyra García (Dario's daughter)

Guest-Stars

- Javier Lorenzo as Benny
- Julio Torresoto as Augusto's lawyer
- Luisa Justiniano as Mercedes
- Gilda Haddock as Dra. Luz Vidal
- Arquimides Gonzáles as Juanma
- Ada Belén Caballero
- Rafael Fuentes
- Sara Pastor as Clotilde
- Walter Rodríguez as Julio
- Elsie Moreau as Doña Margot
- Gladys Nuñez as Dario's Aunt
- Francisco Capó as Calvin
- Cristina Sesto as Omayra
- Nestor Rodulfo as Luis

Supporting Cast (in alphabetical order)

- Abigail Ramos
- Addiliz Borrero
- Alberto Zambrana
- Alexander Méndez
- Alexandra Malagón
- Alexandra Rivera Vélez
- Alexis Fonseca
- Anitza Rivera
- Arella V. Maysonet
- Arturo De Jesús
- Astrid Vizcarrondo
- Camila Terega
- Cándido Rosa
- Carmelo Berríos
- Carmen Escribano
- Clarissa Rodríguez
- Elizabeth Maysonet
- Emma Cáceres
- Ernesto Franco
- Francisco Cairol
- Francisco J. Lebrón
- George Reyes
- Grazziella González
- Gustavo A. Gil
- Héctor J. Bruno
- Henry Mercado
- Heriberto Palas
- Hugo A. Sanjurjo
- Ivette Santiago
- Jacob Rodríguez
- Javier Escalante
- Jonathan Pastrana
- Jorge Antares
- Juan Carlos Betancourt
- Juan Carlos Del Valle
- Juan Pizarro
- "Juke Box"
- Katherine Correa
- Kidany Lugo
- Kyandraliz Santori
- Leonardo Castro
- Lorna Otero
- Luis M. Díaz Rivera
- Luisa Díaz
- Marchela Salazar
- María Arroyo (Primi's friend)
- María J. Guzmán
- María T. Ramos
- Mariana Isabel García
- Mickey Fargas
- Miguel Hernández
- Miriam Cotto
- Myriam Aponte
- Nilsa Claudio
- Oficial Clara Salabarría
- Oficial David Rolón as "Police Officer #1"
- Oficial Edwin Flores as "Cop #2"
- Oficial Edwin Román as "Police Officer #2"
- Oficial Kathy Báez as "Female Cop #1"
- Oficial Luis A. Batista as "Cop #1"
- Oficial Neiza M. Rivera as "Female Cop #2"
- Oficial Rebeca Lozada as "Female Cop #3"
- Omar Acevedo
- Omar Machado (Omar)
- Paola Melisa Nieves
- Ramón Nazario
- Rey A. Soto
- Rosa Cruz
- Samuel Rosario
- Satsha Jorge
- Shekinah Pérez
- Soraya M. Vega
- Valentina Salazar
- Wanda Nuñez
- Xiomara Rodríguez (Sofia's Maid Altagracia)
- Yamira Reyes
- Zoraida M. Betanco
- Zuleyka M. Vega

Confirmed on PrimeraHora.com and Wapa.tv
