= Carlos Ferrari (playwright) =

Argentine-Puerto Rican playwright, actor and director (1931–2025)

- Born: Carlos Ricardo Ferrari Sarracino; July 29, 1931; Buenos Aires, Argentina
- Died: May 8, 2025 (aged 93); San Juan, Puerto Rico
- Occupations: Playwright, theatrical director, actor
- Years active: 1940s–2025

Carlos Ricardo Ferrari Sarracino (July 29, 1931 – May 8, 2025) was an Argentine-Puerto Rican playwright, actor and theatrical director. In Puerto Rico, Ferrari was well loved and known as "The most 'boricua' Argentine", "boricua" being a slang word that means Puerto Rican. In his adopted Caribbean country, Ferrari created the "Nuestro Teatro" ("Our Theater") theatrical company in 1977.

== Life and career ==
Ferrari studied acting from a very young age at Instituto del Arte Moderno (Modern Arts Institute) in Buenos Aires, beginning in the 1940s. He was a radio and television screenwriter and collaborated in that role during the early days of Argentine television. Ferrari toured all over Argentina as a screenwriter.

The Caja Nacional de Ahorro Postal gave Ferrari an award for a play in which he collaborated. The CNAP was a financial institution which was established in 1915 in Argentina under president Victorino de la Plaza; it was geared towards children and awarded young people whom they considered talented.

During the early 1960s, Ferrari moved to the United States, settling in New York City. In the United States, he studied direction at the RCA school. He decided to visit Puerto Rico, where he fell in love with that country's people and its tourist sites, deciding to establish himself there. He immediately directed one play for "Teatro del Sesenta" ("Sixties Theater"), a theatrical company whose stars included, at one time or another, such luminaries as Luis Oliva and Luz María Rondón.

Ferrari directed many of Puerto Rico's top theatrical plays with Teatro del Sesenta, these included "El Herrero y el Diablo" ("The Devil and the Blacksmith"), "Marat-Sade", "La Cocina" ("The Kitchen"), "La Mandrágora" ("The Mandrake"), "Hip Hip Ufa" and his best-known play, "Puerto Rico Fua!", which lasted for many years on Puerto Rican theaters and was shown at the Theater Festival in Nancy, France and in Caracas, Venezuela, among other places.

Other successes included "El Otro Agueybana" ("The Other Agueybana"), "1898: El Ultimo Ano de la Desgracia Colonial y el Primero de lo Mismo" ("1898: The Last Year of the Disgrace of Being a Colony and the First Year of Exactly the Same Thing"), "Los Titingo de Juan Bobo" ("Juan Bobo's Personal Issues") and "Amor en el Caserio" ("Love at the Residencial").

In 1977, Ferrari formed "Nuestro Teatro" ("Our Theater"), one of the most successful theatrical companies of Puerto Rico, together with partners, actor Eduardo Diaz and actress Damaris Rodriguez. With that company, Ferrari presented "El Insolito Caso de Miss Piňa Colada" ("The Strange Case of Miss Piňa Colada"), "Dito! Tan Bueno Que Era!" (Dang! He Was Such a Good Person!"), "Con el Agua Hasta el Cuello" ("The Drowning Pool"), "Como Chava Chendo!" ("Chendo is Always Annoying!") and more.

Through the rest of his life, well into his later years, Ferrari kept writing and directing plays, including "Seis Maridos Para Marie" ("Six Husbands for Marie"), "Festival del Chillo" ("The Cuckold's Bull's Festival"), "Aquel Contraya'o Dia en que no Tuvimos Television" ("That Damn Day in which we had no Television!"), as well as children's plays "La Cigueňa va a la Escuela" ("The Stork Goes to School") and "Bailando al Son Del Corillo" ("Dancing to my Gang's Rhythm"). He continued touring internationally, including Santo Domingo, Dominican Republic and a return to New York.

== Death ==
Ferrari died at a hospice in San Juan, Puerto Rico, on May 8, 2025, at the age of 93.

== Awards and recognitions ==
Ferrari was recognized several times for his work on theater, including by the Circuito de Criticos de Teatro de Puerto Rico, the UNESCO Puerto Rico Association, the Puerto Rico Chamber of Representants and the Ace Awards in New York.

== See also ==
- List of Argentines
- List of Puerto Ricans
