= Samuel Molina (actor) =

Puerto Rican actor and writer (1935–2018)

- Born: March 25, 1935; Lares, Puerto Rico
- Died: June 13, 2018 (aged 83); Caguas, Puerto Rico
- Occupations: poet, actor

Samuel Molina (25 March 1935 – 13 June 2018) was a Puerto Rican actor, writer, poet, screenwriter, songwriter and declaimer. He is best known for acting in several Puerto Rican television telenovelas, such as 1985's Tanairi, and films. He was also a comedian.

== Biography ==
Molina was born in Lares. After attending the University of Puerto Rico, he moved to the United States, setting in New York, New York. He studied acting at New York, at the American Academy of Dramatic Arts.

In 1958, at the age of 23, Molina debuted in theater, on a play named "A Media Luz, Los Tres" (" The Three at Half-Dark"). That play enabled him to establish himself as a theatrical actor and was soon followed by many other theatrical productions. His portrayal of a robber in "Obrero lleno de Lluvia" ("Rain Soaked Worker") earned him general praise from critics.

Soon, Molina was starring in some theatrical plays, such as "Mirándo hacia Atrás con Ira" ("Looking Behind With Anger"), "Monserrat", "Deseo bajo los Olmos" ("Desire Under the Elms"), "Todos Eran Mis Hijos" ("They Were all my Children") and "Tiempo Muerto" ("Dead Time").

In 1970, Molina moved to underground theater, producing a play named "Tiempo Presente" ("Current Times"), a political satire that was shown at La Tea theater in his home country. The play was well received. The busy actor also toured New York City and the Dominican Republic as a poet, presenting himself in shows at those two locations. He also became a composer, and some of his songs were recorded by Puerto Rican singing legend, Danny Rivera.

By then, Molina was also a television actor, featured on many telenovelas of the era such as "El Regreso" ("The Return"), "Tormento" ("Torment") and "Pueblo Chico" ("Small Town"). He also won an Agueybana award, akin, at the time, to the Oscars in Puerto Rico.

In 1976, Molina wrote a book, which he titled "Hombre y Camino" ("A Man and His Journey"), publication which earned him the prestigious Bolivar Pagán writers' award and also an award by the New York Iberian-American Poets and Writers Circle. He also wrote, in 1978, the poems book "Jesú Pobre" ("Poor Jesus", spelled "Jesú" by Molina) as well as "Dos Actos de Locura" ("Two Acts of Craziness"), which was a collection of stories.

During the late 1970s also, Molina acted in some Puerto Rican television comedy productions, namely "Esto no tiene Nombre" ("This has no Name"), "Desafio a los Genios" ("Challenging the Geniuses")-the latter two produced by Tommy Muniz- and Luisito Vigoreaux's productions, "La Familia Politica" ("The In-Laws"), as well as "Sin Ton ni Son" ("Without Ton or Sound") and "Ahi Va Eso!" ("There Goes That!"), which were Producciones Astra productions.

Molina traveled to Mexico early in the 1980s to participate in that country's well-established telenovela industry, hired by Televisa. He acted in such telenovelas as "Chispita" in 1982 alongside famous actress and singer Lucero. He also acted in a film named "Maten al Leon!" ("Kill the Lion!").

While in Mexico, Molina became a playwright, writing what later became theater plays, "La Visita del Extraňo" ("The Stranger's Visit") and "El Pequeňo Dios y su Madre" ("Little God and His Mother"). He also began writing satirical stories during this era.

In 1980, Molina's play "Tiempo Para la Ira" ("Time For Anger") debuted on Puerto Rican theaters, specifically at the XXII Puerto Rican Theater Festival. It starred Luz Maria Rondon and Victor Arrillaga. Molina also returned to theater acting during that year, in "Cronica de un Secuestro" ("Story of a Kidnapping"), in which he acted alongside Jaime Bello. among others. Molina also adapted Miguel Melendez Munoz's "Yuyo" to be showcased on theater and on television as a telenovela.

In 1985, he played a major character in the Telemundo, canal 2 telenovela classic, "Tanairi".

During the 1990s, Molina kept acting, including the Hollywood production, "A Show of Force" (about the Cerro Maravilla murder case), as well as some made for television movies and telenovelas. But he began to steadily retire from public view. In 2007, he had a role in "Illegal Tender", which was partly filmed in Puerto Rico.

== Death ==
Molina died on Wednesday, 13 June 2018, after a two-week hospitalization at the HIMA hospital in Caguas, following a brain stroke.

== See also ==
- List of Puerto Ricans
