= Tanairí =

1985 Puerto Rican telenovela

Tanairí is a 1985 telenovela produced in Puerto Rico with a plot regarding slavery on the island while under Spanish rule. Tanairí, the setting for the series, is the name of the hacienda where the story takes place. The series theme song "Soledad" was performed by Nydia Caro. One of the directors of Tanairi was the well known playwright, Dean Zayas.

== Cast ==
- Juan Ferrara ... Gustavo Medina
- Von Marie Mendez ... Soledad Arizmendi
- Rolando Barral ... Florencio Arizmendi, Soledad's father
- Raúl Reyes León ... young Gustavo Medina
- Von Marie Freyre ... young Soledad Arizmendi
- Braulio Castillo, Jr. ... Pedro Antonio
- Iris Chacón ... Providencia
- Ernesto Concepción ... El Fiscal
- Ofelia D'Acosta ... Emperatriz
- Alba Nydia Díaz ... Altagracia
- Viviana Falcon ... Maria Luisa
- Gilda Haddock ... Cecilia
- Julio Axel Landrón ... Rosendo
- Maria Esther Lasalle ... Cambucha
- Guillermo Leiva ... Notario Medina
- Armando Martinez ... Celso
- Samuel Molina ... Baldomero
- Eileen Navarro ... Maria Isabel
- Roberto Rivera Negrón ... Father Olegario
- Marina Perez ... Dolorita
- José Reymundi ... Father Eugenio
- Carmen Belen Richardson ... Mariba
- Orlando Rodriguez ... Tomas
- Luz María Rondón ... Sor Herminia
- Mercedes Sicardo ... Adele
- Pedro Orlando Torres ... Rev. Patrick Moore
