= Vea =

Puerto Rican gossip magazine

- Cover page of Vea's December 19–24, 2004, issue
- Editor: Josephine Rodríguez
- Categories: Celebrity, human interest, news
- Frequency: Weekly
- First issue: 1969
- Final issue: 2009
- Company: Editorial Chic, Inc.
- Country: Puerto Rico
- Language: Spanish
- Website: www.veavea.com
- ISSN: 0738-7628

Vea was a Puerto Rican celebrity gossip magazine that was published weekly from 1969 to 2009. It was founded by Enrique Pizzi Galindo and Roberto García.

As a periodical that reported on the lives and activities of many of the island's entertainment, sports, and political personalities, the magazine was no stranger to controversy. In 1994, a discovery by a Vea employee caused a wide international controversy, when the employee came across some documents that Puerto Rico was the actual birthplace of famous Mexican singer, Luis Miguel, and not Mexico, as it had been widely believed prior to the discovery.

The magazine also featured film and theater reviews, TV-guide listings, hit-song lyrics, and recipes. It also conducted TV show popularity surveys to select the most widely viewed TV shows on Puerto Rican television, known as "Encuesta Vea". Participants had to fill a coupon published inside the magazine, list on it their favorite TV shows, and mail it in for a chance to win prizes. The magazine ran many other contests, including a raffle to win one of the historic-period gowns worn by actress Von Marie Mendez in "Telemundo's" acclaimed Puerto Rican telenovela "Tanairi".

Noted Vea journalists included Belén Martínez Cabello, Roberto Ramos-Perea (the magazine's theater critic) and Helda Ribera-Chevremont, among others.

Other competitor "small-format" Puerto Rican entertainment gossip magazines included Teve Guía (Puerto Rico's version of TV Guide), Artistas (1977-1994, founded by Jose Antonio Mellado and Miguel A.Lopez Ortiz), and Estrellitas (Founded in 1975 by Hugo del Cañal and José Antonio Mellado), a small-format version of Estrellas, another Puerto Rican entertainment gossip magazine focused on film, television, music and theater.
