= Sobrino de Botín =

Restaurant in Madrid, Spain, opened 1865

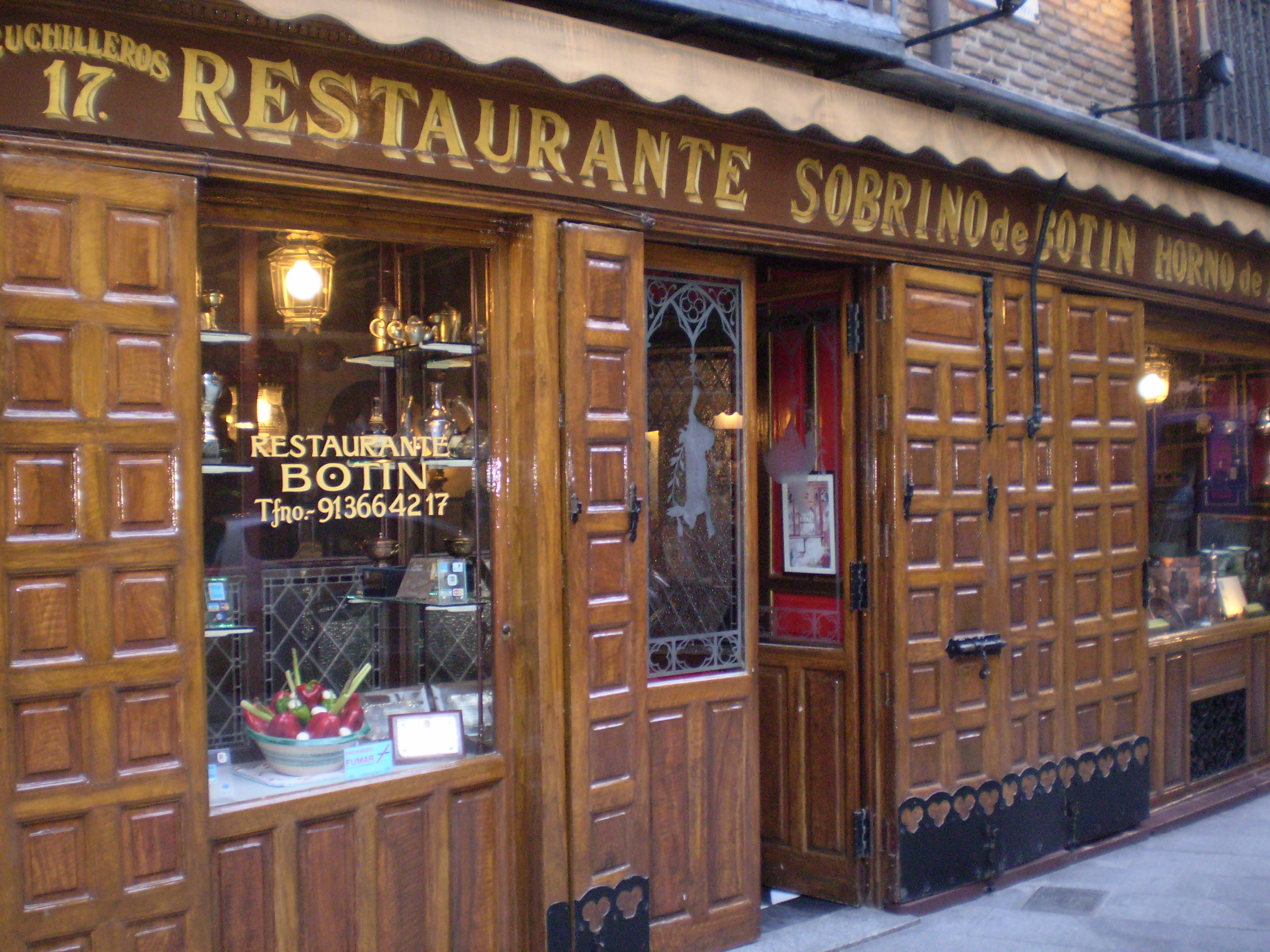
- The exterior of the restaurant in 2006

- Location in Spain

Restaurant information
- Established: 1865; 161 years ago (restaurant)
- Owner: González family
- Location: 17 Calle de Cuchilleros, Madrid, Spain
- Coordinates: 40°24′51″N 3°42′29″W
- Website: www.botin.es

Sobrino de Botín is a restaurant in Madrid, Spain. It is listed in the Guinness Book of Records as the oldest in the world, said to have been founded in 1725 by French cook Jean Botín and his Asturian wife and to have been operating continuously ever since. This is a legend; the restaurant, then called "Pastelería de Cándido Remis, Sobrino de Botín", opened in 1865. However, the restaurant had to close during the COVID-19 pandemic.

== History ==
It appears that at the end of the 18th century, an establishment known as "Pastelería de Botín" was founded in the Plaza de Herradores in Madrid. Its owner was José Puertas Sánchez, nicknamed Botín, who died in 1847. After José Puertas' death, his nephew Cándido Remis Puertas took over the Herradores shop, though only as manager or tenant, since the property belonged to his widow, María Prado (who died in 1855), then to her daughter Juana Puertas Prado, and after her death in 1856, to her widower, Eduardo León. In 1865, Cándido Remis broke with Eduardo León and opened his own establishment, "Pastelería Cándido Remis, Sobrino de Botín" at 17 Cuchilleros Street.

In the 1930s, Botín at Cuchilleros was acquired by the married couple Amparo Martín and Emilio González. The González family is still the proprietor as of 2025.

The original premises in the Plaza de Herradores, known since the beginning of the 20th century as "Antigua Casa Botín" and which boasted of having been founded in 1620, closed due to economic problems in 1936, although it reopened in 1939. It closed permanently in the 1960s, after the property and the rights to the trade name were acquired by the González family, in order to eliminate competition.

The restaurant and its specialty of cochinillo asado (roast suckling pig) are mentioned in the closing pages of Ernest Hemingway's novel The Sun Also Rises. However, Miguel Izu claims that Hemingway most likely was referring to a different restaurant, the Antigua Casa Botín in Plaza de Herradores. Its other signature dish is sopa de ajo (an egg poached in chicken broth, and laced with sherry and garlic), a favorite pick-me-up with madrileño revellers.

== Botin overseas ==
The González family, together with local partners, opened restaurants under the same name as Botín in Miami in 1998, in Mexico in 2004, and in Puerto Rico in 2007, but none were successful, and all were closed some time later.

The Puerto Rican actress Von Marie Mendez and her husband, Dr. Vicente Sanchez, in association with Sobrino de Botin, opened a restaurant in Ponce, Puerto Rico, named Botin. The opening was attended by several celebrities, including former governor of Puerto Rico Rafael Hernandez Colon and then current governor Anibal Acevedo Vila, the actor Braulio Castillo, Jr. and the Mexican singer and actor Fernando Allende.

== See also ==
- Den gyldene freden, Stockholm (established 1722)
