= Pedro Juan Texidor =

Puerto Rican actor and comedian (1951–2024)

- Born: May 30, 1951; Santurce, Puerto Rico
- Died: March 9, 2024 (aged 72); Bayamón, Puerto Rico
- Occupations: Actor, comedian

Pedro Juan Texidor (April 30, 1951 – March 9, 2024) was a Puerto Rican actor and comedian. Best known for his characterization of "Tato" on a television comedy show named "Entrando Por la Cocina" ("Entering Through the Kitchen"). Texidor was an experienced actor, having worked as one for more than 50 years.

== Acting ==
Texidor began to study interior designing and publicity, but he was given a grant to study acting at the Cooperative of Theatrical Arts in Puerto Rico and did not finish the former, focusing on the latter instead. He graduated from the University of Puerto Rico. He studied acting under Myrna Vázquez and Felix Monclova, who were the parents of fellow actor Rene Monclova.

Texidor then joined "Teatro del Sesenta" ("Sixties Theater"), a theatrical company which at one point also included Luis Oliva and Luz Maria Rondon. Texidor acted in such plays as "La Verdadera Historia de Pedro Navaja" ("Pedro Navaja's Real Story"), "Los Titingos de Juan Bobo" ("Juan Bobo's Personal Problems"), "Puerto Rico Fua", "El Otro Pinche" ("The Other Problem") "El Otro Agueybana" ("The Other Agueybana"), "Marat-Sade" and others. He and Oliva shared the stage in "Los Titingos de Juan Bobo".

But while he was well known within acting circles in Puerto Rico, it was his participation in "Entrando Por La Cocina", which gave him mainstream celebrity on the island of Puerto Rico. He acted alongside Yasmín Mejías, Luisito Vigoreaux and Victor Alicea in that show. Later, he also participated in "Raymond y Sus Amigos" ("Raymond and His Friends") alongside Raymond Arrieta and in "El Kiosko Budweiser" ("The Budweiser Kiosk"), among others.

== Eros y Rap ==
Texidor and fellow Puerto Rican comedian, Shorty Castro, formed a comedy rap duo named "Eros y Rap"in the late 1980s. The pair would sometimes appear on television, mocking rap music artists of the era.

== Death ==
Texidor had faced respiratory and heart problems for some time before he died on March 9, 2024, at San Pablo Hospital in Bayamón, Puerto Rico, he was 72 years old. He was survived by his wife Laura S. Sierra Solla and two daughters named Alexandra and Laura. He was buried at Porta Coeli Cemetery in Bayamón, Puerto Rico.

Among those who reacted to his death online were "Entrando Por la Cocina" co-stars Yasmín Mejías (who played "Tato"'s wife "Altagracia") and Victor Alicea, who played "Guillermo" at the show.

== See also ==
- List of Puerto Ricans
