= Gilda Haddock =

Puerto Rican actress

- Born: Caguas, Puerto Rico
- Occupation: Actress
- Known for: Noche de San Juan: Santo en oro Negro, Mili
- Children: 4

Gilda Haddock is a Puerto Rican actress. Haddock has acted in many films and telenovelas.

== Early life ==
Haddock was born in Caguas, Puerto Rico, to Korean War veteran Jorge Haddock and Francisca Acevedo, who was a teacher. When Haddock was four, her parents divorced, and she and her siblings were largely raised by their mother. Haddock's father, however, instilled in her a love for the arts, teaching her how to draw. By age five, young Gilda already showed that she was comfortable in public, being usually picked by teachers to host several school shows and also a first grade graduation.

Haddock was also interested in dancing; she studied ballet with famed dancer Tony D'Astro in D'Astro's Caguas academy, being taught there also by D'Astro's dance partner, Nydia Rivera.

Haddock as a teenager joined the University of Puerto Rico at Rio Piedras, hoping to become a lawyer. At that same time, she joined D'Astro's ballet group as a dancer, where she met and danced alongside, among others, Gladys Nuñez, and also became interested in theater. While at UPR, Haddock noticed that drama students were always hanging out near the university's theater and she started desiring to join the university's theater program, which she eventually did.

Haddock joined a theater company named "Teatro del Sesenta", and, there, she took acting classes under Gilda Navarro. Fellow Puerto Rican, Luis Oliva, was also a member of "Teatro del Sesenta" and Navarro student.

== Professional career ==
Soon after, Haddock was hired for a show produced by Tommy Muniz named Esto No Tiene Nombre ("This Has No Name"), a Puerto Rican television comedy program. Haddock then participated in a show named Tres Muchachas de Hoy ("Three Modern Young Ladies"), where she shared hosting activities with Sonia Noemi and with Alba Nydia Díaz.

Haddock decided to move for a period to Los Angeles, California, to try her luck there and also to study at the prestigious Lee Strasberg Institute acting school.

In 1976, Haddock was lured back to Puerto Rico by an offer to act in the telenovela Pueblo Chico ("Small Town"), which was written by Jacobo Morales and televised on the Canal 11 television channel.

The next year, seeing how Haddock's celebrity was growing in her country of Puerto Rico, Canal 2's producer Paquito Cordero made her an offer to move to that channel and host a show named Señoras y Señores ("Ladies and Gentlemen") alongside singer and show host Chucho Avellanet. Haddock accepted the offer and moved to Canal 2, beginning what would turn to be the most prolific era in her professional show business career.

Haddock then made her film debut, acting as Vanessa del Valle in the 1977 Puerto Rico-Mexico co-production film, La Noche de San Juan: Santo en Oro Negro ("San Juan Night: Santo in Black Gold"), alongside Mexican wrestler El Santo and Luis Daniel Rivera.

1978 saw Haddock act in another film, the Panamanian-Spanish co-production Préstamela esta noche ("May I Borrow Your Girl Tonight?"), as Anita (credited as "Hilda Haddock").

The move to Canal 2 proved pivotal for Haddock; also in 1977, she was chosen to participate in a telenovela named Cristina Bazán, where she worked alongside Venezuelan singer and actor José Luis Rodriguez and Puerto Ricans Johanna Rosaly, Luis Daniel Rivera, Esther Sandoval and her former co-worker, Alba Nydia Díaz.

From there on, Haddock's services as an actress were requested for different telenovelas. These included El Idolo ("The Idol", once again alongside José Luis Rodriguez with Marilyn Pupo), Fue Sin Querer, alongside Sandro de America and fellow Puerto Rican Von Marie Mendez, and Tanairi, in which she shared credits with Mexican Juan Ferrara and, once again, with Von Marie Mendez.

Haddock then moved to Canal 4 during 1984, to star in a telenovela named Mili, where she played the main female character, Maria Milagros "Mili" Ruiz.

Haddock decided, from the period comprising between 1986 and 1992, to concentrate on her family life. She was not, however, jobless. Haddock during this era recorded eight gospel musical cassettes, recorded for the Catholic organization Asociacion Pro Devocion de la Virgen del Rosario del Pozo and one album, titled Porque Para Siempre es su Misericordia ("Because His Mercy is Forever"), all of which were released under the True Way Productions label. At the same time, she became a radio show host, on a show named Mujer de Hoy ("Today's Woman"), which was broadcast on the Puerto Rican radio station 11Q.

Haddock broke her hiatus from television and returned to the Puerto Rican television screens in 1991, co-hosting, alongside Eddie Miro, a Canal 2 show named Noche de Gala.

Haddock also collaborated in children's theater plays, beginning in 2000, including El Pincel y Los Cuentos de la Seňora Potter ("The Brush Tool and Ms. Potter's Tales"), about Peter Rabbit.

In 2000, Haddock acted in the children's play La Bella Durmiente ("Sleeping Beauty"), a play that also included Gladys Rodriguez, former Menudo member Robert Avellanet, Suzette Baco and Lou Briel, among others.

Haddock also participated in other plays, such as Don Quixote, Las Mariposas son Libres ("Butterflies are Free"), La Casa de Bernarda Alba ("Bernarda Alba's House") and Ocho Mujeres ("Eight Women").

During the 2000s, Haddock restarted her film career, acting in various Puerto Rican films.

When she re-took her film acting career, she acted in a Spanish version of "The Importance of Being Earnest" play and films, in this case named La Importancia de Llamarse Ernesto, in addition to 2004's Barrio Obrero (a film which was named after a ward in the San Juan area of Santurce), Santa Claus es Boricua ("Santa Claus is Puerto Rican"), and others.

== Personal ==
Jorge Haddock Acevedo is Haddock's brother; he is the president of the University of Puerto Rico. She also has four children (three daughters and one son), including a daughter named Kiara.

Haddock is friends with another well-known Puerto Rican actress, Giselle Blondet, who, in 2017, convinced Haddock to relocate near Blondet, to Miami, Florida.

== See also ==
- List of Puerto Ricans
