= Aguad =

Aguad is a surname. Notable people with the surname include:

- Luis Aguad Jorge (1925 – 2007), Cuban actor and salesman
- Oscar Aguad (born 1950), Argentine politician
