= Genie Montalvo =

Puerto Rican actress

- Born: November 25, 1952 (age 72); San Juan, Puerto Rico
- Occupation(s): actress, director, producer, author, translator

Genie Montalvo is a Puerto Rican actress, director, producer and author. She was born in San Juan, November 25, 1951.

She starred in Melinda Lopez's How Do You Spell Hope with the Underground Railway Theater at the Kennedy Center in Washington D.C. and in the award-winning The Order of Things in Boston for Playwrites Theater Company. Her stage credits include Hamlet (the only Puerto Rican woman to undertake the characterization of the prince of Denmark) and Hecuba of the Trojan women. She has also received critical acclaim for her Bernarda Alba by Federico García Lorca performed in Puerto Rico, Dominican Republic, and Boston.

Among her film credits are Carlos Fuentes' The Hydra Head (La Cabeza de la Hidra), PBS' production of Destinos, and a lead part in a film on Diabetes produced by the University of Massachusetts Boston. She has also appeared in multiple Telemundo and WAPA-TV daytime dramas including Tres Destinos, Pacto de Amor, Alejandra and Karina Montaner among others. She received the "Best Actress of the Year Award" given by the Theater Critics Association of Puerto Rico for her lead role in El Lado Obscuro del Espejo in 1993. She can be seen soon, in the made-for-TV movie Indigo produced by Von Marie Mendez.

Genie directed Lorca's Blood Wedding (Bodas de Sangre) in the Park Festival in Boston and el Primer Tagazo at the University of Massachusetts Amherst, Boston.

As a producer, Genie presented the only public appearance of Ray Charles in concert in Puerto Rico and directed Ricky Martin as Jesus in The Passion and Death of Christ. Among her other credits, Genie was Extra Casting Coordinator for The Blue Diner.

Genie also participated in the First Orlando Latino Film Festival in October 2007 as a speaker on "Acting in Films".

She has just finished the first of a series of memoirs. The Memoir, Cruzar el Charco, is also being adapted into a screenplay.

== Personal life ==
Montalvo is married to Christian Berrios, has four sons and six grandchildren. She is also a legal and medical interpreter, aiding Hispanic people in Massachusetts where she currently resides.
