= Den gyldene freden =

Restaurant in Stockholm, Sweden

Coordinates: 59°19′23″N 18°04′26″E

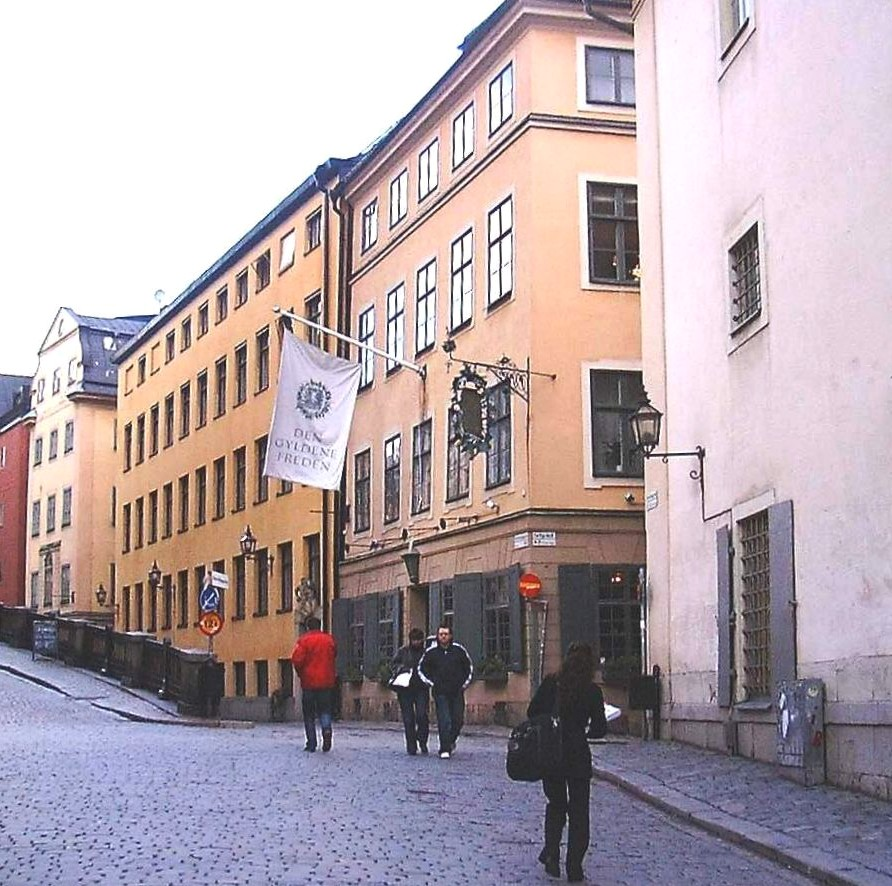
Den Gyldene Freden, established in 1722

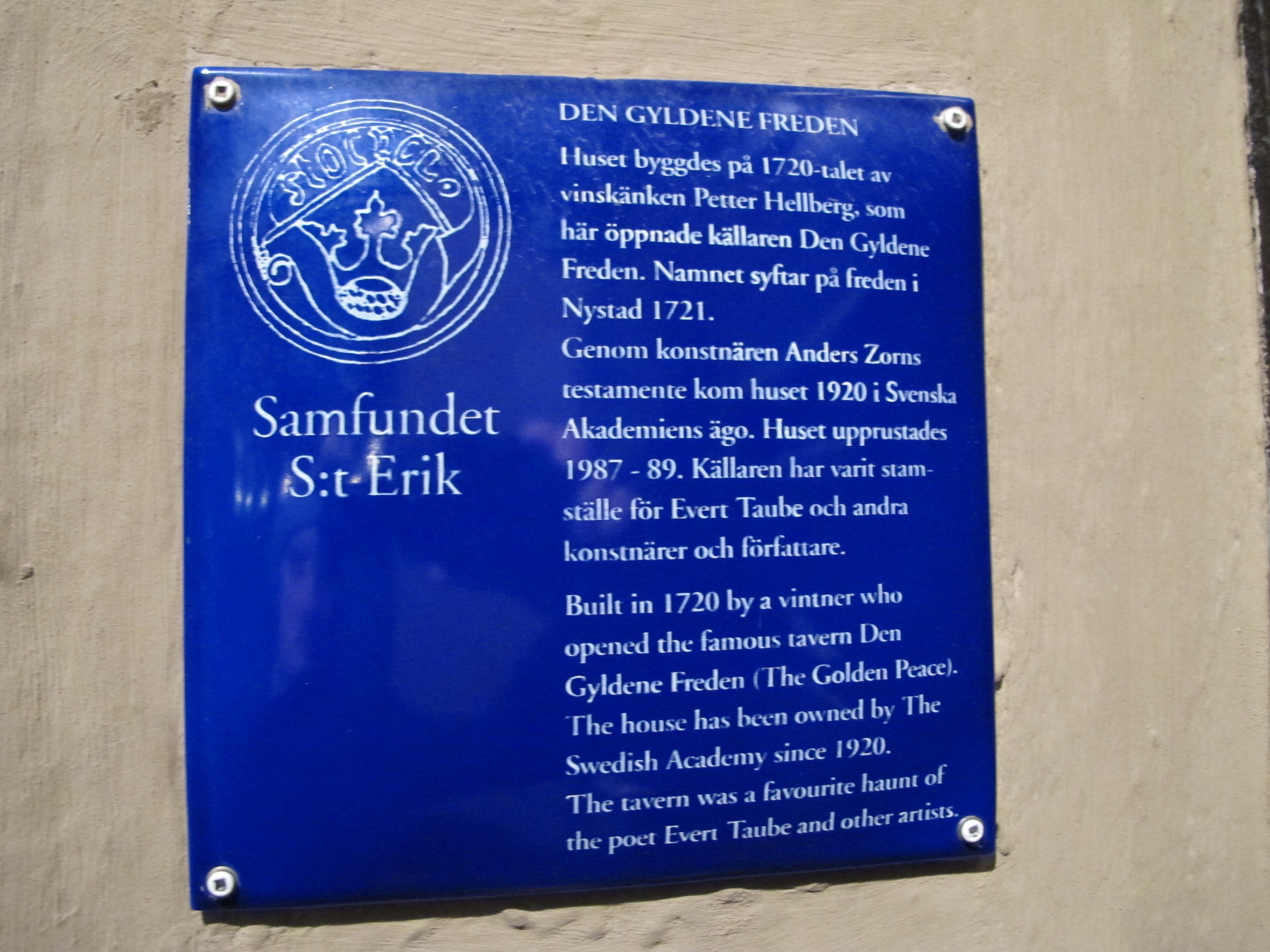
Den gyldene freden plaque

Den gyldene freden (The Golden Peace) is a restaurant in the Gamla stan section of Stockholm, Sweden.

== Description ==
"Freden" ( The Peace), as it is locally called, received its name from the Peace of Nystad (1721) in which Russia won the most provinces but, strangely and luckily (hence "golden"), let Sweden keep Finland. One of Sweden's most well-known restaurants, it is the second-oldest restaurant in the world to have the same surroundings, according to the Guinness World Records. Its surroundings and environment are more or less unchanged since the day that the restaurant opened in 1722, making it a unique example of an 18th-century tavern.

Throughout the centuries, Freden has been a central gathering place for many of Sweden's noted writers, painters, and songwriters; most significantly, Anders Zorn bought Freden in 1919 and saved it from shutting down. The house in which Freden is located is now owned (and therefore secured for the future) by the Swedish Academy. Every Thursday, the Academy (which nominates the winner of the Nobel Prize in Literature) convenes here for its weekly dinner.

The restaurant initially gained its reputation and fame through songs written by national poets Carl Michael Bellman (1740–1795), Evert Taube (1890–1976), and more recently by singer-songwriter Cornelis Vreeswijk (1937–1987).

== See also ==
- Gamla stan
- Swedish Academy
- Sobrino de Botín

== Other sources ==
- Arvidsson, Gösta; Melander Lars (2017) Vi ses på Freden!: en berättelse om Gyldene Fredens historia (Stockholm: Carlssons) ISBN 9789173318501
