= Rodolfo Jiménez =

Mexican actor

- Born: Rodolfo Jiménez Munoz; 15 August 1972 (age 53); Guadalajara Jalisco, Mexico
- Occupations: Actor, television host
- Years active: Since 1988
- Website: http://www.rodolfojimenez.com

Rodolfo Jiménez (born 15 August 1972) is a Mexican film, television actor, and television host. He now owns Maskaras Mexican Grill restaurant in Dallas.

== Early life ==
Jiménez was born Rodolfo Jiménez Munoz in Guadalajara, Jalisco, Mexico.

== Film and television work ==
Year	Film/Show	Role	Notes
1988	Gallego		film
1997	Campeón	Rodrigo	film
1998	Huracán	Ricardo	television series
1998	Tempranito	Himself	television series
1998	Yo Tuve un Cerdo Llamado Rubiel		short film
1999	La Vida en el Espejo	Carlos	television series
2000	Cotorreando	Himself	talk show; 1 episode
2000	Todo por Amor	Rubén	television series
2001	Fox Sports Net Auction	Host	
2001	Miel para Oshún	(voice)	aka Honey for Oshun (International: English title)
2003	Al Rojo Vivo con María Celeste	Himself	1 episode "Especial Miss Universo"; aka Al Rojo Vivo (USA: Spanish title: short title)
2004	Forbrydelser	Principle (host)	film; aka In Your Hands (Europe: English title: informal English title; and International: English title) aka Dogme #34 — Forbrydelser (Denmark: film title)
2004	Space Odyssey: Voyage to the Planets	Principle (host)	television docufiction ; aka Voyage to the Planets and Beyond (International: English title: DVD title)
2005	Titulares y Más	Host	talk and variety show
2005	¡Anita, No Te Rajes!	Julio Cesar Alzugaray	telenovela
2005–2006	Decisiones	Javier Navas	anthology series; 3 episodes
2006	Driven	Carranza	1 episode
2006	La viuda de Blanco (II)	Comandante Pablo Rios	1 episode
2006	Lotería	Ricardo	television series; 1 episode
2006	My Block: Puerto Rico	Himself	television documentary
2006	Noticiero Telemundo	Himself	current events; 1 episode, "Oscar Celebrity Suite"
2008	Al Borde del Deseo	Darío García	television miniseries
2009	Alma Indomable	Leon Rios	telenovela
2009	El Escándalo del Mediodía	Host	
2009	La Tijera	Host	
2010	Despierta America	Host	Morning Show
2010	El Escándalo del Mediodía	Host	
2010	La Tijera	Host	
2010	Don Francisco Presenta	Host	Late Night Show
2011	Nuestra Belleza Latina	Host	
2011	El Escándalo del Mediodía	Host	
2011	La Tijera	Host	
2011	Despierta America	Host	Morning Show
2012-2013	The Real Housewives of Miami	Himself	Several episodes. Was in a relationship with Karent Sierra at the time.
