= Noche de Gala =

Puerto Rican TV series

Noche de Gala (Gala Night) was a television variety show produced by Paquito Cordero. It originated in San Juan, Puerto Rico for broadcast by WKAQ-TV Telemundo on Channel 2.

== History ==
In the early 1970s, it was called El Show Rambler Toyota (The Rambler-Toyota Show) and was hosted by Yoyo Boing. Later, it was called Jueves de Gala (Thursday Gala Ball). In these early years, it was broadcast locally. When the show started expanded internationally, its name was changed to Noche de Gala (Gala Night Ball) because it could be telecast any day of the week.

A later host was Eddie Miró, opposite co-hosts such as Marisol Malaret, Deborah Carthy Deu, Marilyn Pupo and Gilda Haddock. It was a weekly musical, with local and international singers. Stars included Ednita Nazario, Wilkins, Menudo, Tony Croatto, Lisa M, Celia Cruz, Héctor Lavoe, Luis Enrique, Julio Iglesias, Lou Briel, Sandro de América, Sara Montiel, Lucecita Benítez, Rocío Jurado, Isabel Pantoja, Dagmar, Gilberto Monroig, Glenn Monroig, Nydia Caro, Raphael and Lola Flores.

In 2007, Cordero produced a remake, broadcast by WIPR-TV, hosted by Deborah Carthy Deu.
