= Luis Oliva (Puerto Rican actor) =

Puerto Rican mime, actor and comedian

- Born: Río Piedras, Puerto Rico
- Occupations: Actor, mime, comedian
- Years active: 1974–present

Luis Oliva Rodriguez (born 24 November, 1951) is a Puerto Rican mime, actor and comedian. He was born in Rio Piedras, Puerto Rico, a suburb of the country's capital, San Juan.

== Biography ==
Oliva began his professional acting career in 1974, hired for a popular Puerto Rican theater play named "Puerto Rico Fua", of the Argentine playwright, Carlos Ferrari. One year later, Oliva traveled to France with a theater company named "Teatro del Sesenta" in order to participate in "Puerto Rico Fua"'s European shows; this trip would change his life. He decided to stay in the European country to study with Etienne Decroux, who had previously taught Marcel Marceau, who is also considered by experts and critics as one of the greatest pantomimes in history. Oliva during this time grew great admiration for Marceau. During this period, Oliva also studied dancing.

Oliva later participated in French theater plays and recorded a miming special for a French television channel before having the opportunity of acting alongside his idol Marcel Marceau. In 1983, Oliva returned to his home country of Puerto Rico, where he played Juan Bobo, a folkloric Puerto Rican character, in a theater play named "Los Titingos de Juan Bobo" ("Juan Bobo's Personal Issues"). Playing Juan Bobo may have led to Oliva's next role of note, as Juan Bobo is typically characterized as an innocent, good-natured fool in Puerto Rican folklore, sharing similar traits with "Angelito", Raul Davila's "Carmelo"s son in the 1988 WAPA-TV hit television comedy "Carmelo y Punto", a show which enabled Oliva to become known to non-theater goers among the Puerto Rican public and to be interviewed on such magazines as Vea, Teve Guia and others, giving him mainstream celebrity in the island.

Oliva later found work at channel 6's show "Maria Chuzema" alongside Tere Marichal.

Oliva taught mime to students at a local government school in Bayamon, Puerto Rico. He then moved to the United States state of Indiana, where he bought a theater named Theater at the Fort, where he and his wife acted in Hemingway's "The Old Man and the Sea.

== Influences ==
Apart from Marceau, Oliva also lists Gaby, Fofo y Miliki, Diplo, Oliva's early theater teacher Gilda Navarro and Puerto Rican clown Pedro Santos ("Payaso Piruli") among his influences.

== See also ==
- List of Puerto Ricans
- Pedro Juan Texidor
