= May I Borrow Your Girl Tonight? =

- Directed by: Tulio Demicheli
- Written by: Tulio Demicheli; José López Rubio; Alfonso Paso
- Starring: Manolo Escobar; Perla Faith; Antonio Garisa
- Cinematography: Emilio Foriscot
- Music by: Juan José García Caffi
- Production companies: Arturo González Producciones Cinematográficas; Corporación Kenebec
- Release date: 20 March 1978
- Running time: 95 minutes
- Countries: Panama; Spain
- Language: Spanish

May I Borrow Your Girl Tonight? (Spanish:Préstamela esta noche) is a 1978 Spanish-Panamanian musical comedy film directed by Tulio Demicheli and starring Manolo Escobar, Perla Faith and Antonio Garisa.

== Cast ==
- Manolo Escobar as Manolo
- Perla Faith as Rita
- Antonio Garisa as Indalecio
- Narciso Ibáñez Menta as Renzo Ricciardi
- Gilda Haddock as Anita
- Mary Santpere as Rosa
- Alejandro Ulloa as Sr. Perelló
- Rafael Hernández as Taxista
- María Vico as Sra. Ray
- Gustavo Re as Pianista
- Marilyn Pupo as Julia
- José Sazatornil as Mr. Ray
- Florencio Calpe as Epifanio
- Asunción Vitoria as Hermana de Julia
- Rosa Flores
- Emilio Pozo
- José Antonio Vilasaló
- José María Cases
- Mercedes Monterrey
- Muniesa
- Manuel Bronchud as Vecino
- Luis Induni as Comisario

== Production ==
The film (revolving mostly around Escobar) was shot in Benidorm.

== Bibliography ==
- John King & Nissa Torrents. The Garden of Forking Paths: Argentine Cinema. British Film Institute, 1988.
