= Nobel Vega =

Cuban actor (1931–2023)

- Born: August 21, 1931; Cuba
- Died: August 7, 2023 (aged 91); Miami, Florida, United States
- Other names: Tio Nobel, Uncle Nobel
- Occupation: Actor

Nobel Vega (August 21, 1931 – August 7, 2023), better known as Tio Nobel or Uncle Nobel, was a Cuban actor and children's television personality. Vega is mostly remembered for his character as a boat captain who appeared on Puerto Rico's WKAQ-TV's "El Show del Tio Nobel" ("Uncle Nobel's Show"), a daily children's game show he hosted in which children played for prizes, usually Mattel branded toys. His show competed with Spaniard Pacheco's "Cine Recreo", shown on WAPA-TV, Telemundo Puerto Rico's rival television station.

== Early life and career ==
Nobel Vega became an actor in his native Cuba and he participated in various films before, after the Cuban revolution, he, like many other Cuban nationals of the era, left his country. He settled in Puerto Rico where he found television work and fame, first playing Bozo the Clown for young Puerto Rican audiences on WAPA-TV. Vega also participated in a telenovela, 1969's Conciencia Culpable.

Vega then moved to Telemundo Puerto Rico, where he starred as "Tio Nobel" for more than 20 years on the "Tio Nobel Show" as well as in "El Mundo Infantil del Tio Nobel" ("Uncle Nobel's Children's World") and "El Festival del Tio Nobel" ("Uncle Nobel's Festival"). In later years, he took his "Tio Nobel" character and moved to another Puerto Rican channel, Tele Once.

== Personal life ==
Vega moved from Puerto Rico during the later stages of his life and he resided in Miami, Florida. He was married to his longtime wife, Nadine Zayas.

=== Illness and death ===
Vega in his older age suffered a number of health issues, including having a brain stroke which left him with difficulty to speak, heart problems which led to having a pacemaker installed, several injuries and Alzheimer's disease.

Nobel Vega died at his home in Miami on August 7, 2023, at the age of 92. He was buried at Our Lady of Mercy Catholic Cemetery in Miami, Florida.

== Filmography ==
Vega participated in three films, including one Hollywood film.

- "La Justicia de Los Villalobos" (1961, as "Machito")
- "Aqui Estan Los Villalobos" (1962, also known as "La Justicia de Los Villalobos 2" and as "El Terror Blanco", as "Machito")
- "Calendar Pin-up Girls" (1966)

== See also ==
- List of Cubans

=== Fellow Cuban expatriates in Puerto Rico ===
- Luis Aguad Jorge
- Carlos Muñiz Varela
- Titi Chagua
- Marilyn Pupo
