= Joaquín Monserrat =

Spanish comedian and television personality

Joaquín Monserrat Llarden, "Pacheco"
- Born: 5 April 1921; Barcelona, Spain
- Died: 5 November 1996 (aged 75); Puerto Rico
- Occupations: Host, Comedian
- Title: Marquess of Cruillas

Joaquín Monserrat Llarden, known as Pacheco (5 April 1921 - 5 November 1996) was a Spanish comedian and host of children programs. In 1960, he moved to Puerto Rico and he became a popular host of children programs.

== Biography ==
Joaquín Monserrat was born on 5 April 1921 in Barcelona. In 1951, he moved to Havana, Cuba, where he worked as a comedian for nine years in CMQ Television. It was in Cuba that he met and befriended a local actor named Luis Aguad Jorge, who would later join him many times on Puerto Rican television as El enanito Holsum. In 1960, he moved to Puerto Rico and was hired as a scriptwriter and comedian in the program Pacheco, Detective Privado.

In 1962, he was hired by WAPA-TV, creating the children program Cine Recreo. In the program, Monserrat (now known simply as Pacheco) gave the children advice, interviews, and showed cartoons. One of the most emblematic traits of the show was the portrayal of drawings done by children that watched the show and sent them to Pacheco. The show stayed as one of the children favorite since the 60s until the 90s.

Pacheco then created the game show Contra el Reloj. For 13 years, he hosted the Jerry Lewis MDA Telethon in the island and occupied the position of Honorary Vice President.

In 1987, he organized the first familiar "bicicletada" (bike marathon) with the participation of 15,000 people. The second "bicicletada" had the participation of 30,000 from all ages, being registered in the Guinness Book of World Records by its attendance.

Pacheco died on 5 November 1996. He was buried at Buxeda Cemetery in Carolina, Puerto Rico.

== See also ==
- Tio Nobel
- Titi Chagua
