= Adamari López =

Puerto Rican actress

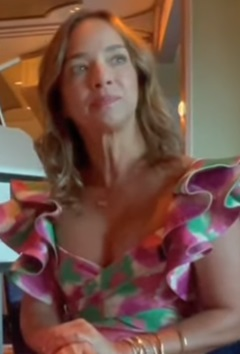
- Adamari López in 2022
- Born: Adamari López Torres; May 18, 1971 (age 55); Humacao, Puerto Rico
- Education: Universidad del Sagrado Corazón (BA)
- Occupations: Actress and TV Host
- Years active: 1978
- Height: 1.57 m (5 ft 2 in)
- Spouse: Luis Fonsi (m. 2006; div. 2010)
- Partner: Toni Costa (2011-2021)
- Children: 1

Adamari López Torres (born May 18, 1971) is a Puerto Rican actress known for participating in several Puerto Rican and Mexican soap operas. She was a host on the Telemundo morning show Hoy Día and its predecessor Un Nuevo Día for 11 years, and is a Latina ambassador for WW, formerly Weight Watchers.

== Early career ==
The daughter of an undertaker, Luis López, Adamari started her career at the age of six in the Telemundo Canal 2 production of the Cristina Bazán soap opera, alongside legendary Puerto Rican actress Johanna Rosaly and Venezuelan singer José Luis Rodríguez, El Puma.

Her talent indicated a future superstar. WAPA-TV next chose her to play Iris Chacón and Daniel Guerrero's daughter "Jenny" in Yo sé que mentía. She was a child actress playing an important supporting role in the story, thus she became a household name.

A short, two chapter appearance on Vivir Para Ti followed in 1983, and after that, López decided to dedicate herself to her studies. She holds a B.A. in communications from the University of the Sacred Heart.

== Adulthood and fame ==
After reaching the age of maturity, she came back, participating in several plays at Puerto Rico's Teatro Tapia, San Juan's premier and oldest theater, and getting the attention of Mexican producers.

She traveled to Mexico next, after the invitation by the producers to try out there, and became a superstar in that country as well, working in many top soap operas, including Camila and the national super hit Amigas y Rivales. López also participated in Mujer, Casos de la Vida Real, where she played a victim of rape that later turned lesbian.

== Recent years ==
In 2004, López participated in the soap opera Mujer de Madera. During the recording of that soap opera, her father, Luis, a respected and successful undertaker, suffered a heart attack and had to be hospitalized and operated on. López was given immediate permission to travel to Puerto Rico and be with her father for as long as she needed. Her father recovered, but with only five percent of his heart working. López had to return to Mexico after her father was released from the hospital, but she flew back to Puerto Rico every time that the filming schedule allowed her to. In 2011, she participated in the second season of Univision's dancing show Mira Quien Baila where she was one of the top dancers and won the competition.

López was one of the original hosts of the Telemundo morning show Un Nuevo Día, which was relaunched as Hoy Día in 2021. On April 6, 2023, it was announced that she would be leaving the show after 11 years on the network.

== Personal life and relationships ==
López was married to fellow Puerto Rican, singing super star Luis Fonsi. In 2006, López and Fonsi announced they would be getting married during the summer of that year. They were married on June 3, 2006, in Puerto Rico. On November 8, 2009, Adamari López and Luis Fonsi released a joint statement where they announced they were separating. They were divorced on November 8, 2010. In January 2013 López published a tell-all book, Viviendo. She met Toni Costa while participating in a dance contest called Mira Quién Baila (Look who's dancing) and on September 20, 2014, announced that she was expecting her first child with Costa, who was now her fiancé. She gave birth to a girl, Alaïa, on March 4, 2015. In 2019 she and Costa celebrated 8 years together, as a couple. On May 27, 2021, Maria Celeste Arrarás announced in her social media sites that in an interview, Adamari López stated she and Costa, her partner of 10 years, had separated.

== Health ==
On March 22, 2005, López held a press conference in San Juan announcing she had been diagnosed with breast cancer. Her then-boyfriend, Luis Fonsi, announced at the same press conference that he was cancelling his 2005 international tour to be by her side. She was expected to recover, as her cancer was caught at "stage 1," which is a very early stage, and it had not spread to other areas of her body.

She underwent cancer surgery. In 2006, it was reported that she was in remission. Since being diagnosed, she has campaigned for breast cancer awareness.

In 2020, López was a Weight Watchers ambassador. Oprah Winfrey welcomed her into the WW community during her 2020 Vision: Your Life in Focus tour in Fort Lauderdale, Florida.

== Filmography ==
=== Telenovelas ===
Year	Title	Character	Notes
1994	Señora tentación		
1997-1998	Sin Ti	Maria Elena Ysaguirre	Main Antagonist
1998-1999	Camila	Mónica Iturralde	Main Antagonist
2000	Locura de Amor	Carmen Ruelas	Co-protagonist
2001	Amigas y Rivales	Ofelia Villada	Protagonist
2002	Gata Salvaje	Karina Rios	Protagonist
2004	Mujer de Madera	Lucrecia Santibáñez Villalpando	Co-protagonist
2007	Bajo Las Riendas Del Amor	Ingrid Linares	Main Antagonist
2008	Alma de Hierro	Rita Anguiano de Hierro	Main Antagonist
2017	La Fan	Carmen Córdoba	Special Participation
2021	La suerte de Loli	Herself	Special Participation
2024	¿Quién Caerá?	Herself	Game Show host

== See also ==
- List of Puerto Ricans
- Luis Fonsi
- Cristina Bazán
- Johanna Rosaly
