= Los Díaz de Doris =

2002 film directed by Abdiel Colberg

- Release date: 2002
- Country: Puerto Rico

Los Diaz de Doris is a Puerto Rican film made in 2002.

== Synopsis ==
Los Diaz de Doris ("Doris' Days") is the fictional story of "Doris Diaz", a divorced mother of two who is an executive in a San Juan building.

"Doris" is a middle aged woman whose kids lead a secret life away from her: Her son dangles into the world of drugs, while her daughter lies to her about going to school, when in reality, she cuts class to meet with her boyfriend.

On a night out with her best friend, Doris meets a young company executive with whom she had had minimal contact before. They decide to see each other again, and then, they begin dating.

Soon, Doris begins to be harassed by a young woman, and she discovers that her boyfriend is actually a married man. The young wife turns out to be a psychotic person who is bilingual, an arts saleswoman, and only interested in keeping her marriage so that it would appear to high society that she has everything she wants.

During one of her getaways with her boyfriend, Doris' daughter stops at a supermarket to buy some snacks and gets involved in the middle of a robbery. She is taken hostage at gunpoint by the robbers, and held for ransom. During this situation, the new man in Doris' life helps gather the help of Doris' ex-husband and to keep the family united during the difficult moment. Doris' son is ordered by his underworld friends to conduct a murder, but the proposed victims turn out to be his sister's kidnappers, so, instead of carrying out the murder order, he rescues his sister. She informs him she had been harmed, when he tried to find out if she had been raped.

Meanwhile, Doris' boyfriend's wife had lied to him, telling him that he was sterile, and he could not have any children, this after discovering that Doris had become impregnated by her husband. It was actually she and not her husband who had been diagnosed as sterile, but she lied to keep Doris and her husband apart. As a consequence of the lies, Doris tells her boyfriend that she is pregnant, he thinks she was seeing another man because he was told he was sterile, and he does not accept responsibility for the baby.

But, on one night out, he runs into his family doctor, who told him that he was not the one with the problem. With his wife's lies uncovered, he realizes that the baby Doris is carrying is his.

The movie ends with a scene where he runs down an avenue to follow a public bus where Doris is riding. He finally reaches the bus, and he explains everything, and asks Doris to forgive him, which she does, and the passengers in the bus applaud them as they kiss.

== Cast ==
- Alba Raquel Barros
- Braulio Castillo, hijo
- Cirilo Cruz (former Major League Baseball player, brother of José Cruz) Policeman
- Cordelia González, Doris
- Diana Quijano, Amneris
- Velda González
- Kidany Lugo
- Flor Joglar (better known as the mother of René Pérez, aka Residente Calle 13)

== See also ==
- Cinema of Puerto Rico
- List of films set in Puerto Rico
