= Pedro Urdemales =

Pedro Urdemales (Spanish: "Peter Evil-schemer") is a character from Spanish and Latin American (especially Chilean, Mexican, and Guatemalan) folklore that typifies the rogue, rascal or trickster. In Brazil, Portugal and lusophone culture, he is known as Pedro Malasartes (Portuguese: "Peter Bad-arts").

== Origin ==
The origin of this character is present in the medieval Spanish legends. The oldest documented reference was found in the late 12th century, in an Aragonese paper, in which a character is named Pedro de Urdemalas ("Peter of Bad-things-schemer" in Aragonese).

Pedro de Urdemalas or Pedro Malasartes is also considered a trickster figure in Iberian and Latin American tradition.

== First appearance in literature ==
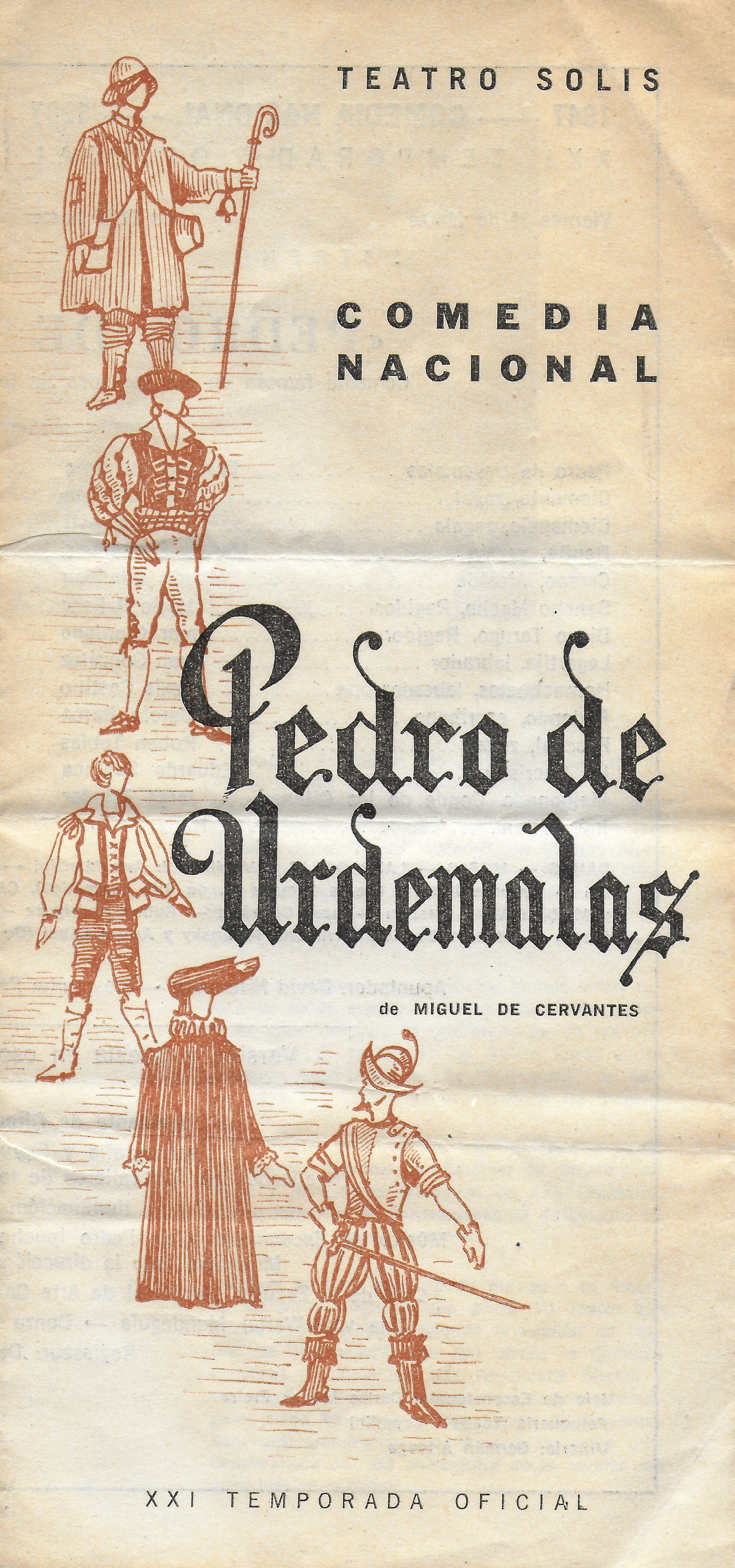
Hand bill for a production of Pedro de Urdemalas in Uruguay, 1967.

The first literary mention is located in the book Libro del paso honroso, by Suero de Quiñones, possibly written in 1440. Shortly after, new references are found in theatrical authors about this character, where he becomes a prototype of a ruffian in several entremeses (interludes). Thus, Pedro de Urdemales takes part in works of Juan del Encina, Lucas Fernández, Lope de Rueda and Juan de Timoneda.

Miguel de Cervantes, author of Don Quixote, wrote a full-length comedy in verse based on the character, and entitled Pedro de Urdemalas. In 1615, it was published in the collection Ocho comedias y ocho entremeses ("Eight Plays and Eight Interludes"), and can be read online, and has been translated into English several times. It has, however, rarely been produced.

== See also ==
- Till Eulenspiegel, a similar character from German folklore
- Coyote (mythology)
- Juan Bobo
