= Denissa Lopp =

Puerto Rican vedette dancer, actress and singer

Ivonne Denissa Lopp Ramírez, better known by her artistic nickname, Denissa, is a Puerto Rican vedette dancer, actress, and singer. During the 1980s and 1990s, she was known for her participation in many Puerto Rican television shows. Lopp was also once an exotic dancer. During 2019, Lopp appeared on a Telemundo Puerto Rico television show named Dando Candela, where she alleged to have "seen everything" as an exotic dancer.

== Legal troubles ==
Lopp was once accused of prostitution, when she featured as an exotic dancer in a club named Lips in Hato Rey, San Juan. She was declared guilty of prostitution in late November 2012, by judge Eloina Torres Cancel.

In 2013, she declared to the Puerto Rican newspaper El Nuevo Dia, that she had no plans to return to Lips to work.

== See also ==
- List of Puerto Ricans
