= Braulio Castillo Jr. =

Puerto Rican actor

- Born: August 30, 1958 (age 68); Santurce, Puerto Rico
- Occupation: telenovela actor

Braulio Castillo Jr. (born August 30, 1958 in Santurce, Puerto Rico) is a Puerto Rican actor and radio host. He is the son of Braulio Castillo, an actor across Latin America, and the brother of the lesser known Jorge Castillo, also a television and theater actor.

== Biography ==
For a short time during the 1970s, he was first known in Puerto Rico doing newsbreaks for WKBM-TV Channel 11 in Caguas, now Univision O&O WLII.

Castillo reached national fame in Puerto Rico when he participated in the 1984 Spanish soap opera Coralito at San Juan-based WKAQ-TV Channel 2. There, he shared star billing with Mexican actor Salvador Pineda and with Puerto Rican actress Sully Diaz. Afterwards, Castillo reached teen idol status across Puerto Rico. In 1985, he was one of the stars of the successful telenovelaTanairi, alongside actress Von Marie Mendez. That year (1985), Castillo was hired to co-host a game show named Adelante Juventud (Come on, Youth) alongside Myraida Chaves. He also starred in three telenovelas alongside fellow Puerto Rican actress Millie Aviles.

Castillo subsequently acted on numerous telenovelas in Mexico, Peru and Venezuela.

In the 1990s he starred in the sitcom,Tres Hombres y..., inspired by the movie Three Men and a Baby, alongside Raymond Arrieta and Alba Nydia Díaz on the WKAQ-TV Telemundo de Puerto Rico network. Castillo also was the leading man of the telenovela Karina Montaner, opposite Giselle Blondet, broadcast by WAPA-TV Channel 4 in San Juan. For several years, Braulio starred in various soap operas in Colombia.

In 2003, Castillo starred in the film Los Diaz de Doris, alongside Cordelia Gonzalez and Velda González, Kidany Lugo and former Major League Baseball player Cirilo Cruz.

In 2006, he performed the role of Zacks in the musical A Chorus Line, at the Caguas Performing Arts Center, alongside Marian Pabón and Daniela Droz, among others. Castillo was acknowledged not only for his acting, but for his phenomenal attributes as a stage dancer.

Starting in 2007, he co-hosted a daily radio morning talk show alongside Mirayda Chaves while keeping on performing in numerous theatre productions in San Juan.

Also in 2007, Castillo performed the leading role in director Jacobo Morales's film Ángel.

In 2011 he starred in the Puerto Rican premiere of Yasmina Reza's play God of Carnage at the Tapia Theatre in San Juan.

He starred in the Puerto Rican production of Jerry Herman's La Cage Aux Folles as Georges, opening in August 2013 at the Luis A Ferré Performing Arts Center in San Juan.

Early in 2014, Castillo revealed that he had battled prostate cancer in 2011.

On early October 2020, he revealed that he had gone through an emotional crisis, due to a personal situation as well as the uncertainty of the pandemic, which lead for him to seek help at the hospital for depression symptoms.

== Acting career ==
Year	Title	Role
2020	Subete a mi Moto	Edgardo Diaz
2012	El Talismán	Renato Leduc
2010–2011	Aurora	Dr. Gustavo Ponce de León
2010	El Fantasma de Elena	Tomás Lafé
2006	Dueña y Señora	Manuel Santarosa
2005	Fuego en el alma	
1999	Cuando despierta el amor	
1998	Cuentos para despertar	Abelardo Díaz Alfaro
1995	Eternamente Manuela	Francisco Grijalba
1993	Guadalupe	Alejandro
1985	Tanairi	Pedro Antonio
1984	Coralito	

== See also ==
- List of Puerto Ricans
