= Daniel Guerrero (actor) =

Argentine actor, radio announcer, and show host (1945–2022)

- Born: 7 August 1945; Castelar, Argentina
- Died: 15 January 2022 (age 76)
- Occupation(s): Actor, radio announcer, show host
- Years active: 1968–2021
- Spouse: Zulma Faiad (divorced)
- Children: 2 (Daniela Guerrero, Eleonora Guerrero)

Daniel Guerrero (7 August 1945 – 15 January 2022) was an Argentine actor, radio announcer and show host. He was best known as a telenovela actor who worked in many Latin American countries.

== Early life ==
Guerrero was born in Castelar, Buenos Aires.

At the age of 23, in 1968, Guerrero joined the Instituto Superior de Enseñanza Radiofónica (ISER), a school for prospective radio announcers in Argentina.

As a radio host, Guerrero worked at various Argentine radio stations, including El Mundo, Splendid, Belgrano, Rivadavia and FM Palermo.

== Acting career ==
Guerrero became a well-known actor in Argentina and internationally during the 1980s. He traveled to Puerto Rico and to the United States during 1982 to record a Puerto Rican telenovela named Yo Se Que Mentia ("I Know He Lied"), which gave him popularity in the small Caribbean country. In Yo Se Que Mentia, Guerrero played Puerto Rican actress Iris Chacon's character's husband, as well as young Adamari Lopez's character's father.

In 1983, Guerrero starred in Cara a Cara ("Face to Face"), with Mexican actress Veronica Castro. He also starred in the Argentine telenovela Rossie and the Venezuelan Tu Mundo y el Mio ("Your World And Mine").

Guerrero was a prolific actor; apart from those telenovelas, he also acted in the youth-oriented telenovela Por Siempre Amigos ("Friends Forever"), featuring Puerto Rican boy band Menudo, (which at the time had Ricky Martin as a member); in Alta Comedia ("High Comedy"); Pablo en Nuestra Piel ("Paul Gets Under our Skin"); El Teatro de Diego Vittori ("Diego Vittori's Theater"); Quiero Gritar Tu Nombre ("I Want to Scream Your Name"); Esta Puede Ser tu Historia ("This Could be Your Story"); El Gran Amante ("The Great Lover"); and Matrimonios y Algo Mas ("Marriages and Something Else").

He also had a long theater acting career, which included plays Aplausos ("Applauses"), El Andador ("The Walker"), Mateo, Es Mas Lindo Con Amor ("It's Prettier With Love"), Una Zulma y Dos Adanes ("One Zulma And Two Adams"), Unas Piernas Con Historia ("Legs With Miles on Them"), Cena de Matrimonios ("Married Couples Dinner"), Estrellas de Mar ("Sea Stars"), Cuando Adan Perdio la Hoja ("When Adam Lost the Leaf"), Una Noche a La Italiana ("An Italian-Style Night"), Novio por Diez Dias ("Boyfriend for Ten Days"), Usted no es Greta Garbo ("You Are Not Greta Garbo") and Mi Viudo Tiene un Marido ("My Widower Has a Husband").

His film career consisted of five Argentine film productions: El Bromista ("The Joker"), Brigada Explosiva Contra los Ninjas ("Explosives Brigade Against Ninjas"), La flor de la mafia ("Flower of The Mafia"), Un Elefante Color Ilusion ("An Illusion Colored Elephant") and Micaela, Una Pelicula Magica" ("Micaela, a Magic Movie").

== Show hosting ==
Guerrero also hosted a number of television shows in Argentina. These included Buenas Tardes, Mucho Gusto ("Good Afternoon, Nice to Meet You"), Sabados Continuados ("Continuing Saturdays"), Sabados Musicales ("Musical Saturdays"), Matinee, Nuevediario ("Nine Diary") Hollywood en Castellano ("Hollywood in Spanish") and Teleonce Informa ("Teleonce Informs You").

== Personal life and death ==
Guerrero was once married to Argentine vedette, singer and actress Zulma Faiad; the couple married in Mexico and had two daughters: Daniela and Eleonora Guerrero.

Guerrero was hospitalized in intensive care due to a pulmonary embolism during January 2022, which was further complicated by the chronic obstructive pulmonary disease that he suffered. After being in the hospital a few days, he died on 15 January of that year.

Upon learning of Guerrero's death, his Yo Se Que Mentia co-star Iris Chacon declared that "His passing causes me profound sadness because he was an excellent co-worker. He helped me a lot as an actor, because when the telenovela was being filmed, I was [also] doing my television show and traveling a lot".

== See also ==
- List of Argentines
