= Yasmín Mejías =

Former member of Puerto Rico Senate

Member of the Puerto Rico Senate from the Carolina district
- In office January 2, 2001 – January 1, 2005

Personal details
- Born: January 30, 1960 (age 65) New York City
- Party: Popular Democratic Party
- Spouse: Marcos Malory
- Children: Yasmin Cruz Mejías, Alejandra Cruz Mejías, Cristian Emanuel López Mejías
- Profession: Politician, actress, singer

Yasmín Mejías Lugo is a Puerto Rican actress, comedian, singer, politician and former Senator. She was a member of the Senate of Puerto Rico from 2001 to 2005.

Mejías is famous for her performance of Dominican maid Altagracia, a character who starred in the show Entrando por la Cocina, a show that started in 1986 and ran for 16 years. At that show, Pedro Juan Texidor played her husband, "Tato". Mejías has also appeared in several other shows. She is also a known theater actress in the island.

In 2000, Mejías was elected to the Senate of Puerto Rico for the District of Carolina. In 2003, she presented her candidacy for reelection, and won her party primaries. However, at the 2004 general elections, she lost to the candidates of the PNP, Lornna Soto and Héctor Martínez Maldonado.

Mejías has been married to singer Marcos Malory since the 1990s. They have one son together: Cristian Emanuel. She is currently working as coordinator of two community programs: Llave, for drug users; and Vivienda Transitoria, for homeless people.
