= Teve Guía =

Puerto Rican gossip and listings magazine

Teve Guía was a Puerto Rican gossip and listings magazine. The magazine was established by Mario Prévidi and Juan Ortiz Jiménez in 1962. Teve Guía was written in association with the United States magazine, TV Guide, but had a slightly different format. The publisher of Teve Guía was Agencia de Publicaciones.

Apart from offering daily programming information, Teve Guía also published interviews with entertainers, both from Puerto Rico and on the international scene, and gossip sections. Another section, Querida Aurora, was a Dear Abby style column, dedicated to counseling readers who wrote in seeking advice.

Teve Guia's main competitors were Artistas, Estrella, Estrellita, and Vea.
