= Von Marie Mendez =

Puerto Rican actress and restaurateur

- Born: Von Marie Mendez; 8 September 1950 (age 76); Ponce, Puerto Rico
- Known for: Actress

Von Marie Mendez (born September 8, 1950) is a Puerto Rican actress and restaurateur. Alongside such others as Iris Chacon, Millie Aviles, Sully Diaz, Giselle Blondet, Ivonne Goderich, Marilyn Pupo and others, she is remembered as one of the leading actresses during the golden era of telenovelas produced in Puerto Rico, that being between the late 1950s and the early 1990s.

Mendez is a native of the southern city of Ponce.

== Acting ==
Mendez worked as an actress for canal 2, a Telemundo station. Among other well known telenovelas she acted on is 1982's "Fue Sin Querer", 1985's "Tanairi" alongside Juan Ferrara-where she was directed by the famed playwright Dean Zayas-and 1987's "Preciosa", a sequel to "Tanairi" and where she acted alongside Rogelio Guerra.

== Restaurateur ==
In 2007, Mendez opened a restaurant named "Botin" in Ponce. Botin was opened in association with the owners of the "Sobrino de Botín" restaurant in Spain, which is considered the oldest restaurant still operating and was opened in 1725. Several other celebrities attended the opening of her restaurant, including former governor Rafael Hernandez Colon and then current governor Anibal Acevedo Vila as well as fellow actor Braulio Castillo, hijo and Mexican singer and actor Fernando Allende.

== Personal ==
Mendez is married to Dr. Vicente Sanchez. She has a son who was born in 1974, chef Luis Freyre, and a daughter who was born in 1980, Von Marie Freyre.

In 2012, her son was accused of fraud. He reached an agreement and paid $2,500 dollars.

== See also ==
- List of Puerto Ricans
