= Lorena Franco =

Spanish model, actress, and writer

Lorena Franco (born 1983) is a Spanish model, actress, and writer. She has acted in more than 35 short films and 6 films in Spain and in popular TV series such as El secreto de Puente Viejo and Gavilanes, among others. She has been the face of various advertising brands nationally and internationally. She is also known for her music videos and Internet series. She combines her career as an actress with writing, with eleven titles published on Amazon.com. Her books have been translated internationally in several languages.

== Acting career ==
Title	Year	Category	Director
Paharganj	2019	Film (India)	
Broken	2017	Series	Xavier Ruax
Centro Medico	2016	TV series (Spain)	
La Maniobra de Heimlich	2013	Film	Manolo Vázquez
La Musa y la Conciencia	2013	Short film	Cristian Valenciano
Pulse A para Asesinato	2013	Short film	Wiman
Mis ex Novias	2013	Online series	Alejandro Calvo
Omertá Di Enrico	2012	Film	Gino Rodríguez
Llameahora	2012	Short film	Luis Endera
Heartbreakers	2012	Online series	Cris Calvente
Momentum	2012	Short film	Luis Felipe Ruíz
Las Reglas del Juego	2012	Short film	D.W. Fernández
Ishalem, Memorias de un Vampiro	2012	Film	Sergio González Román
Ermessenda	2012	Film, TV 3	Luis María Güell
Un Cerdo en Casa	2012	Short film	Xavier Ruax
El Secreto de Puente Viejo	2011	TV series, Antena 3 Spain	David Montoya
Movimiento R	2011	Series, Local TV	Jacobo Benoit
La Apertura de la Nuez	2011	Short film	Guillermo Ruotolo
La Novia	2011	Short film	David Vergès
Ángel Monstruo Mujer	2011	Short film	Camilla Mantovani
Gavilanes	2010	TV series, Antena 3 Spain	Rafa Montesinos
Y el Oscar es Para	2010	Short film	Elena Lario
Pelotas	2009	TV series, TVE Spain	José Corbacho and Juan Cruz
Sé lo Que Hicisteis	2009	Program TV, laSexta	Ángel Martín
Green Power	2009	Online series	Marc Crehuet
La Fiesta de Adan	2008	Film	Santiago Lapeira
Fan Factory	2008	Presentadora en Urbe TV (Music program TV Spain)	
La Chica de la Curva	2007	Short film	Cristian Molina
Latidos	2006	Film	Carlos Pastor
