= Yo Sé Que Mentía =

Puerto Rican soap opera

Yo Sé Que Mentía was a 1982 soap opera produced by Puerto Rico's WAPA-TV.

It included Argentina's Daniel Guerrero, Puerto Rican singer and dancer Iris Chacón, a young Adamari López, Amneris Morales, Miguel Ángel Suárez and Ángela Meyer. It also included Ivette Rodriguez as "Fanny" and Luz María Rondón.
