= Tommy Cruz =

Puerto Rican baseball player (born 1951)

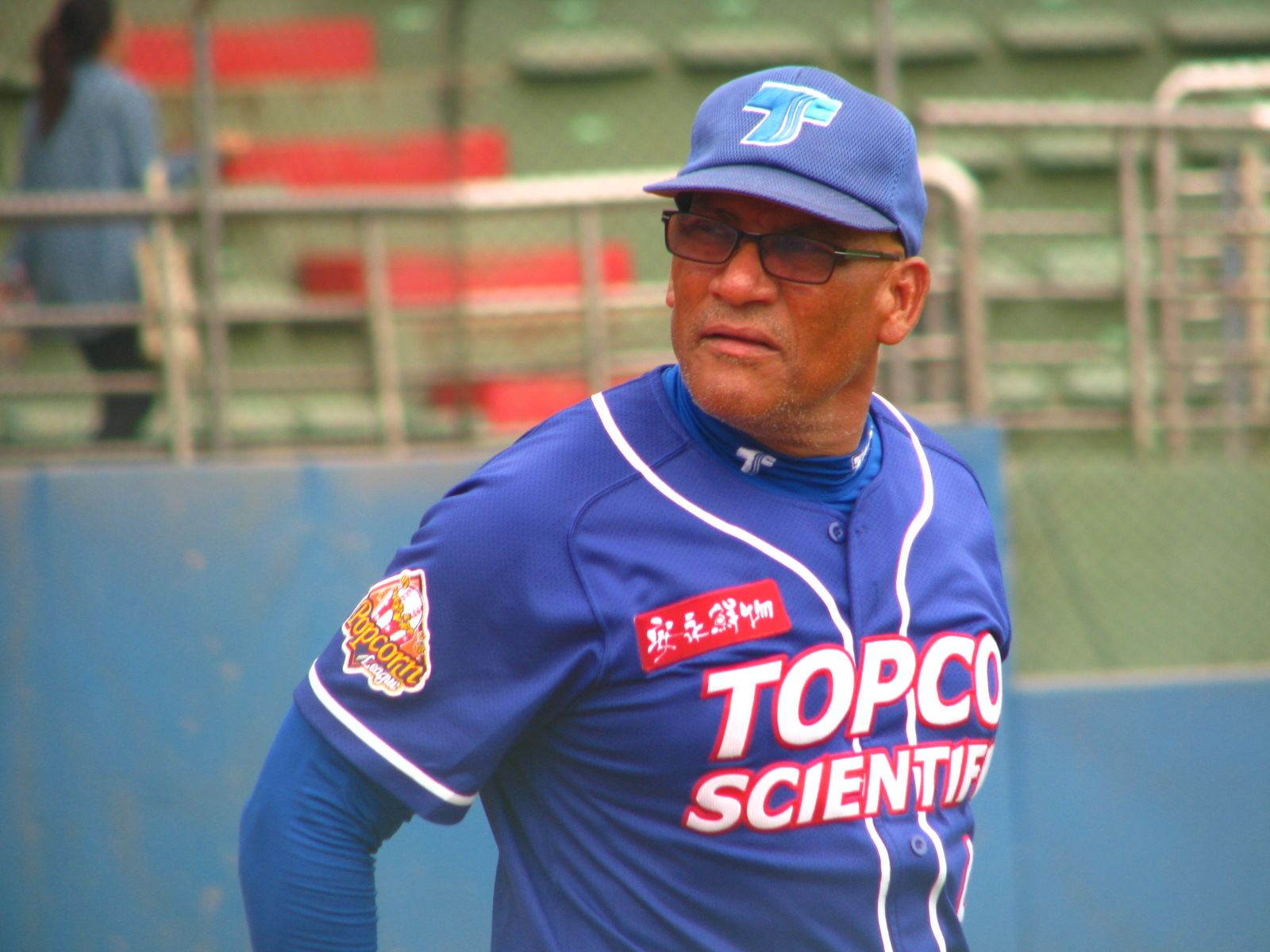
- Outfielder / Coach
- Born: February 15, 1951 (age 74); Arroyo, Puerto Rico
- Batted: Left Threw: Left

Professional debut
- MLB: September 4, 1973, for the St. Louis Cardinals
- NPB: April 5, 1980, for the Nippon-Ham Fighters

Last appearance
- MLB: September 25, 1977, for the Chicago White Sox
- NPB: October 22, 1985, for the Nippon-Ham Fighters

MLB statistics
- Batting average: .000
- Home runs: 0
- Runs: 2

NPB statistics
- Batting average: .310
- Home runs: 120
- Runs batted in: 466
- Stats at Baseball Reference

Teams
- St. Louis Cardinals (1973); Chicago White Sox (1977); Nippon-Ham Fighters (1980–1985)

Career highlights and awards
- 2× Pacific League All-Star (1982, 1984); Best Nine Award (1984)

Cirilo "Tommy" Cruz Dilan (born February 15, 1951) is a Puerto Rican former outfielder in Major League Baseball who played for the St. Louis Cardinals (1973) and Chicago White Sox (1977). Cruz batted and threw left-handed. He is the brother of Héctor and José Cruz, and uncle of José Cruz Jr.

== Career ==
Cruz had a brief major league career, appearing in seven games for the Cardinals and White Sox, going hitless in two at-bats with two runs scored. He also played in the Rangers and Yankees farm systems. He was traded along with cash from the Cardinals to the Rangers for Sonny Siebert on October 26, 1973. He was dealt along with Jim Spencer from the White Sox to the Yankees for Stan Thomas and cash on December 12, 1977. The transaction also included an exchange of minor-league right‐handed pitcher with Ed Ricks going to the White Sox and Bob Polinsky to the Yankees.

From 1980 through 1985, Cruz played in Japan for the Nippon-Ham Fighters. An All-Star in 1982 and 1984, he posted a .310 batting average with 120 home runs and 466 RBI in 712 games played. He was given the Best Nine Award in 1984.

On January 14, 2009, Cruz was named the hitting coach for the Single-A High Desert Mavericks in the Seattle Mariners organization.

== Acting ==
Cruz participated as an actor in the Puerto Rican film, Los Diaz de Doris, playing a policeman.

== See also ==
- List of Major League Baseball players from Puerto Rico
- List of Puerto Ricans
