= Rosaura Andreu =

Cuban actress

Rosaura Andreu (1 January 1918 – 21 November 2010) was an actress born in El Paso, Texas to actress Cecilia Cavero. Andreu is best remembered in Puerto Rico for playing the character "Tití Chagua" in a local television show for children.

Cecilia Cavero moved with her children to Havana, where Rosaura Andreu met her first husband: the famous Cuban comedian Leopoldo Fernandez, nicknamed "Tres Patines."

Andreu first visited Puerto Rico as part of a Cuban theatrical troupe. Years later she settled on the island and joined the group La farandula bohemia. In the 1950s, Andreu was part of the early years of Puerto Rican television. She became known to the children television viewers in such programs as Romper Room con Berta and others.

During the 1970s, she became widely famous when the Puerto Rican public television channel, WIPR-TV, started airing her program, El Show de Titi Chagua (Auntie Chagua's Show). The show had tough competition, such as WRIK/WLUZ's Sandra Zaiter show, WAPA-TV's Cine Recreo con Pacheco (with Joaquin Monserrat as Pacheco) and WKAQ-TV's El show del Tío Nobel (Uncle Nobel's Show). The four main children's shows in Puerto Rico at that era were shown at the same hour every weekday, to compete against each other as El Show de Tio Nobel also had Saturday and Sunday morning editions. However, her show stayed on the air until the middle 1980s, when WLUZ was sold and relaunched as WSTE in 1987.

== Later life ==
She retired from show business to Orlando, Florida, where she died.

== Death ==
Andreu died November 21, 2010, aged 92, at her Orlando home.

== See also ==
- List of television presenters/Cuba
