= Salvador Pineda =

Mexican actor

- Born: Salvador Pineda Popoca; June 16, 1952 (age 74); Huetamo, Michoacan
- Origin: Mexican
- Occupation: Actor
- Years active: 1980s–present

Salvador Pineda Popoca (born June 16, 1952, in Huetamo, Michoacan, Mexico) is a Mexican actor, who has participated in over 20 Mexican telenovelas and Mexican movies, as well as two Hollywood low budget movies. Born to Mexican politician Salvador Pineda who served under Mexican President Adolfo Ruiz Cortines, and Gloria Pineda, house-wife. His uncle (on his mother's side) is the renowned Mexican cardiologist Ignacio Chavez Sanchez.

== Biography ==
Salvador Pineda is known for his acting on many Televisa soap operas, including 1980s Colorina with Lucía Méndez, and Mi Pequeña Soledad with Verónica Castro. He is also remembered for his soap opera Tu o Nadie with Lucía Mendez and Andrés García. Pineda and García were considered two of the sexiest Latino actors of the 1980s, appearing in shirtless photos in magazines sold in Latin America.

Pineda's identifiable, gravelly voice and his physique led to his being type-cast as a villain, or, less frequently as a gruff, edgy heroic lead.

Pineda began his internationalization in 1984, when he worked in Puerto Rico as the star of canal 2's Coralito, with Sully Diaz. He returned to Puerto Rico in 1985, to film another telenovela with canal 2.

Pineda also made an attempt at a singing career, having released one CD. He was in a relationship with Venezuelan actress Mayra Alejandra with whom he had a son. He has a daughter, but is very private about it.

=== Telenovelas ===
Year	Title	Character	Notes
2025	Me atrevo a amarte	Dionisio Paz Chavarria	
2023	El Señor de los Cielos	Julio Zambrana	Supporting role (Season 8)
2014-15	Muchacha italiana viene a casarse	Dante Dávalos	Main cast
2012-13	Qué bonito amor	Concho Hernandez	Main cast
2010-11	Triunfo del Amor	Rodolfo Padilla	Main cast
2009-10	Corazón salvaje	Arcadio	Main cast
2008	El juramento	Padre Salvador	Supporting role
2004-05	Inocente de ti	Rubén	Supporting role
2002	Te amaré en silencio	Emilio	Main cast
2002	El país de las mujeres	Aquiles	Supporting role
2000	Golpe bajo	Andrés Carranza	Main cast
1999	Besos prohibidos	Felipe	Lead role
1998	La mentira	Dr. Francisco Moguel	Supporting role
1997	Esmeralda	Dr. Lúcio Maláver	Main cast
1994-95	Morelia	Federico Campos Miranda	Supporting role
1993-94	Guadalupe	Antonio	Supporting role
1992-93	Marielena	Esteban	Supporting role
1990	Mi pequeña Soledad	Gerardo	Main cast
1989-90	El magnate	Rodrigo Valverde	Main cast
1988	Mi nombre es coraje	Jerónimo	Lead role
1987	Como la hiedra	Lorenzo Navarro	Lead role
1986-87	El camino secreto	David Genovés	Lead role
1985	Tú o nadie	Maximiliano Alveniz	Main cast
1984	Coralito		Lead role
1983	Bianca Vidal	José Miguel Medina Rivas	Lead role
1981-82	El derecho de nacer	Alfredo Martínez	Main cast
1981	Soledad	Andrés Sánchez Fuentes	Lead role
1980	Colorina	Enrique	Supporting role
1979	J.J. Juez	Martín Gondra	Lead role
1978	Rosalia	Leonel	Lead role
1977	Rina	El Nene	Supporting role

== Sources ==
- Official "El Juramento" Website
