= Eileen Navarro =

Puerto Rican actress (born 1958)

- Born: September 28, 1958 (age 67); Hato Rey, Puerto Rico
- Occupations: Television, theater and film actress

Eileen Navarro (born 28 September 1958) is a Puerto Rican actress who has been in several well known telenovelas in her country, as well as the 1984 film production "Coneccion Caribe", where a young Navarro shared credits with Puerto Rican boy band "Los Chicos de Puerto Rico" (which, at the time included the now international singing star "Chayanne") and with Juan Manuel Lebron and Otilio "Bizcocho" Warrington, among others.

== Early life ==
Navarro was born in Hato Rey, Puerto Rico, a suburb of San Juan, the daughter of well known cook and cooking book author Myriam Felipez and her husband, announcer Paquito Navarro.

While in high school, Navarro decided to join the Theatron of Puerto Rico acting troupe. She then enrolled at the University of Puerto Rico's drama department after graduating high school.

== Professional career ==
In 1980, when Navarro was in her early 20s, she met producer Angel Del Cerro, who was a major figure at the time at the Puerto Rican television station, Telemundo Puerto Rico, and with Del Cerro's assistant, actor José Fuentes. Del Cerro and Fuentes helped Navarro get her first television job, when she acted in the Puerto Rican actress Gladys Rodriguez-starred telenovela, "Ariana".

Navarro followed that by acting in "Rojo Verano" ("Red Summer"), where she worked alongside Rodriguez, Mexican actor Rogelio Guerra and Cuban actor and show host Rolando Barral. She then played "Margie", a major character in the telenovela "Julieta", where she acted alongside Puerto Rican Giselle Blondet and Paraguayan actor Arnaldo Andre.

Next, Navarro starred in a telenovela for the first time, and in a film. Hector Travieso, the Cuban-Puerto Rican actor and show host, offered her the role of "Norma" in "Amar o Morir" ("To Love or Die") which was an indie production that was picked up by Telemundo and gave Navarro exposure in the United States since it was also shown on Univision, then known as the "Spanish International Network" or SIN, to Hispanic audiences in that country. In addition, Navarro made her film debut, acting as Ricardo Bauleo's character's love interest in "Coneccion Caribe" ("Caribbean Connection"), a Puerto Rican teen musical comedy film starred by boy band Los Chicos de Puerto Rico.

During the next few years, Navarro kept active on the Puerto Rican television screens, working on such telenovelas as "Preciosa" ("Precious"), "Ave de Paso" ("Bird of Passage"), "La Otra" ("The Other One") "Yara Prohibida" ("Yara, Prohibited"), "Karina Montaner", "Aventurera" ("Woman Adventurer") and 1992's "Natalia".

Eileen Navarro was also a prolific theater actress; she performed, during this era, in many plays on the Puerto Rican theater scenes, including "El Efecto de los Rayos Gama Sobre la Flor Maravilla" (Paul Zindel's "The Effect of Gamma Rays on Man-in-the-Moon Marigolds"; Navarro participated in the Puerto Rican version during 1985)

Navarro kept on acting even as Puerto Rican telenovela productions dried up, beginning in the 1990s. In 2003, she was in a mini-series named "Psicosis".

In 2009, Navarro acted in the Puerto Rican theatrical play, "Te Presto mi Vientre" ("I'll Let you Borrow my Stomach").

== Personal life ==
From 2005 to 2009, Navarro lived in Miami, Florida.

Navarro has a son.

=== Health problems ===
Navarro was wrongly diagnosed with Lipedema, and she had a total of 12 different surgeries related to the disease. She does suffer from fibromialgia and depression.

She went public about her struggles with depression, abandonment by her family and a negative economical situation during 2019. "To my family, I was like Cinderella...my family practically left me abandoned", she told Puerto Rican senator Evelyn Vázquez on a WIPR-TV television show named "Mujer, No Estas Sola! Rompe el Silencio!" ("Woman, You Are Not Alone! Break Your Silence!"), where she added that she "(knew) what it is like to be hungry and having only one water bottle in the refrigerator...luckily, God has always put little angels in my walk of life". Navarro has tried to commit suicide four times.

In 2018, Navarro had a double mastectomy done in Los Angeles, California.
