= Coralito =

Puerto Rican television series

Coralito (Little coral), is a Puerto Rican telenovela produced by Telemundo. The main characters were played by Sully Díaz and Salvador Pineda. Díaz played the character of Coralito. The telenovela played in 1984. Ednita Nazario performed the theme song of the telenovela titled Mi Pequeño Amor (My Small Love), written by her then husband, Argentine-Venezuelan composer, Laureano Brizuela, who also performed the song with her.

Ofelia D'Acosta and Braulio Castillo, Jr. also acted in Coralito.
