= Juan Bobo =

Folkloric character on the island of Puerto Rico

Publication information
- Publisher: HarperCollins; Dutton Children's Books; Scholastic Books
- First appearance: 56 Picaresque Tales (in the U.S., 1921); Juan Bobo Heats up his Grandmother; Juan Bobo Delivers a Letter to the Devil; Juan Bobo Throws his Brother Down a Well; Juan Bobo Refuses to Marry the Princess
- Created by: School children of Puerto Rico

In-story information
- Species: Picaresque
- Place of origin: Puerto Rico
- Abilities: Avatar of indigenous morality; Repository of cultural information; Resistance to colonial oppression; Syncretic of Santería and Capoeira

Juan Bobo is a folkloric character on the island of Puerto Rico. For nearly two centuries a collection of books, songs, riddles and folktales have developed around him. Hundreds of children's books have been written about Juan Bobo in English and Spanish. Juan Bobo stories are used as instructional models in public school districts and libraries throughout the United States and on PBS Television.

Each story illustrates an aspect of Puerto Rican life and traditions – as Juan goes to church, to work, the store, the town market, and deals with characters and events that typify the Puerto Rican spirit. For this reason, the Juan Bobo stories have been viewed as a "folkloric information system." Often a trickster and sometimes a fool, Juan Bobo is comparable to "Foolish John" who cannot get anything right, and Amelia Bedelia who follows instructions to a fault. Sent off by his mother to find work, Juan Bobo causes one disaster after another and always loses his payment. In a typical Juan Bobo story, his mother asks him to clean up a pig so that she will fetch a higher price in the town market. Instead, Juan Bobo dresses her for church in his mother's Sunday clothes, complete with lipstick and high heels.

Although the name "Bobo" implies stupidity or oaf-like behavior, the ostensible naiveté of Juan Bobo points to a hidden virtue or helpful way to approach life. As in Aesop's Fables, the stories often have obvious morals that suggest how people should live and how cultures should interact.

As the trickster character in Puerto Rican folklore and oral tradition, Juan Bobo is part of a larger tradition that spans several world cultures. Many of the tales have nearly identical plot points in stories from India, China, Turkey, and traditions in Africa and North America.

== Historic and literary roots ==
The Juan Bobo tales originally migrated from Spain in an oral tradition influenced by the Spanish picaresque novels (Lazarillo de Tormes; Don Quijote) and Wise Fool tales. Published anonymously in 1554, El Lazarillo de Tormes is often viewed as the first modern novel, and "picaresque" became the first genre – a genre of realistic fiction in which the pícaro (the rogue) is the central character.

The pícaros are unlikely and delinquent heroes – living by their wits among corrupt priests and prostitutes, beggars and idle gentlemen, thieves, tricksters and murderers.

The Juan Bobo stories incorporate all of these elements – as Juan the pícaro roams the Puerto Rican countryside, moving from job to job, and disaster to disaster. Though Juan and his pícaro tricks constitute the main story interest, the satirical comments on various trades and professions give a wealth of information on the social, political and religious fabric of Puerto Rico.

As Paul Bunyan is identified with the US, Robin Hood with England, and El Zorro with Mexico – Juan Bobo, the beloved noodlehead, is the perennial folk hero of Puerto Rico.

== Distribution ==
=== Children's books and educational uses ===
Juan Bobo children's books have been published in the U.S. and throughout the world. Juan Bobo stories have been published by numerous publishers, including HarperCollins, Dutton Children's Books, and Scholastic Books. The stories are used as elementary school teaching books, for bilingual language programs, and in Spanish-language studies throughout the United States among others. In 1962, New York City librarian Pura Belpré authored a novel based on the Juan Bobo character, titled Juan Bobo and the Queen's Necklace: A Puerto Rican Folk Tale.

=== General book sales ===
Stories portraying Juan Bobo are known in many countries, from the United States to Central and South America, the Caribbean, Spain and the Philippines. Juan Bobo books are sold in Great Britain. The National Library Board of Singapore maintains a listing of Juan Bobo books. In the Philippines, Juan Bobo stories go by the name "Lazy Juan".

=== In U.S. media ===
Newspapers around the U.S. regularly run Juan Bobo stories. The Juan Bobo character has made frequent appearances on U.S. television, radio, and the internet. In 2005, he appeared on Nickelodeon in the Dora the Explorer series. The episode was titled A Crown for King Juan el Bobo, and Juan Bobo was voiced by Cheech Marin. On U.S. public television, the Juan Bobo stories are used by PBS stations in Alabama, Arkansas, California, Chicago, Iowa, and the nationwide PBS Learning Media system. Currently, Juan Bobo stories and radio dramas are regularly broadcast over radio stations in Puerto Rico. Juan Bobo CDs are also sold on the island and in the United States, as well as Juan Bobo MP3 downloads.

== Reception and impact ==
The Juan Bobo character has been called an avatar of indigenous morality, a repository of cultural/historical information, and a symbol of resistance to colonial oppression. As such, in United States and Puerto Rican universities, the Juan Bobo stories have been preserved and studied for their sociological and political significance. Juan Bobo has also been compared to the syncretic religious system of Santería and the Brazilian martial art of capoeira, for its melding of spiritual strength and resistance into an ostensibly benign art form.

=== In U.S. popular culture ===
Given the centuries-long history of the Juan Bobo tales, and because Puerto Rico has been a U.S. territory, Juan Bobo has been designated as an American folk character. The American Legends children's books included Juan Bobo in a series of four folkloric books. The other three were Paul Bunyan, John Henry, and Pecos Bill.

In the theatrical arts, in New York City, Theatre Works USA developed and presented a Juan Bobo play, together with a children's study guide in 2008. The Teatro Círculo Theater Company mounted an Off-Broadway production of The Mischievous Juan Bobo in 2006. Also in 2006, the Open Eye Theater in Minneapolis performed The Adventures of Juan Bobo. This was followed in 2009, by the University Theater of Northeastern Illinois University presented a Juan Bobo play titled Señora Tortuga.

Children's theater companies enact the Juan Bobo stories, often in the form of puppet plays.

In New York City, a group of grade school children made a Juan Bobo animated film, and children's Juan Bobo play scripts are available. A float with Juan Bobo characterizations was also part of the 156th Carnaval de Ponce on 2 March 2014 in Ponce, Puerto Rico.

=== Internationally ===
The Chilean actor/singer Antonio Prieto sang a popular Juan Bobo ballad in recognition of the folkloric character. On May 4, 2012, the School Librarians Association of Puerto Rico created an all-day special event in Villalba in homage and recognition of Juan Bobo and his legacy.

== See also ==
- Folk literature
- Latin American literature
- Puerto Rican literature
- Folklore of Puerto Rico
- Luis Oliva - actor who has played "Juan Bobo" theatrically
- Pedro Urdemales
