= Luis Aguad Jorge =

Cuban actor

Luis Aguad Jorge (August 25, 1925 – November 6, 2007) was a Cuban actor and salesman who, due to his small size, was better known as "El Enanito de Holsum", a bread company where he worked for many years of his life.

== Early life ==
Aguad Jorge was born in a Havana suburb. As a young man, he met and befriended Joaquin Monserrat, an actor who later moved to Puerto Rico and became famous there as children's character "Pacheco".

Aguad Jorge himself became involved in acting during his youth in Havana, performing at several theatrical plays there.

== Life in Puerto Rico ==
In 1961, Aguad Jorge moved from Cuba to Puerto Rico, where he reunited with old times friend Monserrat. He was introduced to Luis Vigoreaux, sr. and to Tomas Muniz, jr. This in turn led him to get a role in the 1965 Puerto Rican television show La Criada Malcriada, starring Velda Gonzalez Jacobo Morales, Emma Rosa Vicenti and Aguad Jorge himself. The show was a major hit and Aguad Jorge became a celebrity across his new country.

This show was immensely popular among Puerto Ricans (even influencing a local tomato sauce brand to rename itself as "Criada" sauce) and, in 1968, Puerto Rican marketing firm "Badillo-Compton" came with the idea for Holsum Bread to hire Aguad Jorge as national brand spokesperson in Puerto Rico. His friend and fellow Puerto Rico celebrity "Pacheco" himself introduced Aguad Jorge to his new job at Holsum. Aguad Jorge enjoyed his new job so much that he actually not only performed as the brand's spokesperson, but worked himself at Holsum's plant daily for the next 23 years until he retired in 1991. He also had Holsum make a custom sized truck that he drove himself to personal public appearances.

Aguad Jorge continued participating on Puerto Rican television until his later years, on a show named "Contra el Reloj", alongside Monserrat, on Canal 4 in Puerto Rico. In this show, he shared activities with Jeanie Carrión, sister of Josué Carrión, later to become famous as a show host and businessman in Puerto Rico.

== Death ==
Luis Aguad Jorge died on November 6, 2007, at a retirement home in San Juan, Nuestra Senora de la Providencia, where he had been living since 2005.

His funeral was attended by, among others, Puerto Rican businessman, actor, show host and politician Roberto Vigoreaux-son of Luis Vigoreaux, sr.-and Holsum Puerto Rico president Ramon Calderon. As his body was driven from the funeral home to his burial site at Porta Coeli Cemetery in Bayamon, Holsum company trucks lined up at Las Americas Expressway, all with dark linens on, in honor of Aguad Jorge.

Due to his love for Puerto Rico and its people, Aguad Jorge had requested that, shall relations between Cuba and the United States normalize before his passing, he be allowed to die in his adopted nation. Also per his request, he was buried with his Holsum Breads uniform on, as he came to love that company and consider his co-workers there as his second family.

== See also ==
- List of Cubans
- List of Puerto Ricans
- Nobel Vega
