= Sully Díaz =

Puerto Rican-American actress

Sully Diaz
- Occupations: Actress, singer, comedian
- Years active: 1979–2018
- Known for: title role in Coralito

Sully Díaz is a Puerto Rican actress and singer. Sully's career started in Puerto Rican television with her first starring role as Coralito in the telenovela Coralito. Sully was invited to star in various soap operas in Puerto Rico, Venezuela and Argentina.

In February 2012, Diaz was featured in the Spanish-language production of The Vagina Monologues, a play written by Eve Ensler, an American feminist who fights against gender violence worldwide. It has been translated into 49 languages and performed in over 120 countries. The 2012 cast also included Ivy Queen, Eileen Navarro, Lourdes De Jesús, Roxana Laborde, Yasmin Pietri, and sexologist, Carmita Laboy. This version was presented in Orlando, Florida.

== Filmography ==
Film
Year	Film	Role	Notes
1985	La Gran Fiesta	Mari Tere	
1989	True Believer	Maraquilla Esparza	
1997	Clockwatchers	Waitress	
2001	Sunstorm	Ruthie	
2006	Yellow	Carmen Campos	
2008	La mala	Teresa	
2009	Princess Protection Program	Queen Sophia Fioré	TV movie
Television
Year	Title	Role	Episode
1980	El ídolo	Evelyn Romany	
1983	Coralito	Coralito	Title role
1986	Claudia Morán	Claudia Morán	Title role
1990	Aventurera	Peggy	TV movie
1990	Gryphon	Lupe	TV movie
1990	The Old Man and the Sea	Maria	TV movie
1991	Law & Order	Alicia Rivers	Episode: "The Secret Sharers"
1991	El árbol azul	unknown	
1994	Shattered Image	Gloria	TV movie
1995	Zooman	Monita	TV movie
1995	Ellen	Maria	Episode: "The Promotion"
1996	Bloodhounds	Teresa	TV movie
2004	Amores	Me llamo Eva	
2004	Cuando despierta el amor	unknown	
2004	Siempre te amare	Antagonist	TV movie
2005	El cuerpo del delito	unknown	TV movie
2005	Cuando el universo conspira	Eva	TV movie
2008–2009	Al borde del deseo	Cecilia	
Video games
Year	Title	Role	Notes
1996	Don't Quit Your Day Job	Sari Ghandi	
