= Iris Chacón =

Puerto Rican dancer, actress and singer

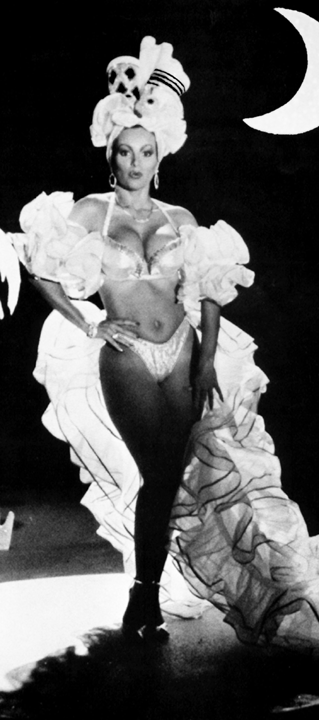
- Chacón in 1982
- Born: Iris Belia Chacón Tapia; March 7, 1950 (age 76); San Juan, Puerto Rico
- Other names: La Bomba de Puerto Rico; La Vedette de América
- Occupations: Dancer; singer; actor
- Spouses: Elín Ortiz (m. 1968; div. 1973) Carlos Rosario (m. 1976; div. 1976) Junno Faria (m. 1977)
- Children: 1

Iris Belia Chacón Tapia (born March 7, 1950) also known as "La Bomba de Puerto Rico" and "La Vedette de América," is a Puerto Rican dancer, singer, actress, and entertainer. Chacón became a prominent figure in Latin America, the United States, Europe, and Japan during the 1970s and early 1980s. She starred in films and telenovelas, and appeared in one of Puerto Rico's most famous television commercials.

== Career ==
Chacón has been known by various nicknames, such as "La Bomba de Puerto Rico" (The Puerto Rican Bombshell), and "La Vedette de América" (America's Showgirl). During her heyday in the 1970s and early 1980s, she toured most of Latin America, the United States, Europe and Japan. She also starred in two movies and many telenovelas, such as Yo Sé Que Mentía.

=== Amalie Oíl commercial ===
In 1982, AMCAR, Inc. hired her for a television commercial about Amalie Oil Company automobile coolant products, which became one of the most famous television commercials in Puerto Rico's history. The publicity surrounding the commercial landed her in a front-page article in The Wall Street Journal in June 1983 entitled "A Onetime Choirgirl Rules as Sex Goddess On Puerto Rican TV". The ad employed a play on words between the English word coolant and Spanish culón, which means large derrière (buttocks).

=== Mid-1980s to present ===
From 1984 through the early 1990s, Iris Chacón appeared on such American TV shows as America Onstage, The Joan Rivers Show, The Merv Griffin Show, Geraldo Rivera Show, and David Letterman. Letterman described her as the Dolly Parton and Loni Anderson of Puerto Rico and joked about proposing to her. Griffin said of her that "she was the answer to 'Where's the beef?'", a reference to the Wendy's commercial of that time period. However, by 1984, Chacón reached her peak, and not being able to reach an "Anglo" market, ended her show in Puerto Rico by mid-1985 at the age of 35. Her show aired in syndication until the end of the 1980s. She was along several figures, including Los Gamma, that participated in the inauguration of Súper Siete following the sale of the channel.

Outside of the U.S., Chacón appeared on various Spanish-language programs, including Anabel, Siempre en Domingo, Mala Noche No, and Al Ritmo de la Noche which were all Televisa productions.

== Personal life ==
Chacón married Puerto Rican musician Junno Faria in 1977; the couple had one daughter, Katiria. They were married for over 40 years. Chacón divides her time between Orlando and Puerto Rico.

== Interaction with Muhammad Ali ==
In February 1976, Iris Chacón was featured in a comedic exhibition match in Puerto Rico involving world heavyweight champion Muhammad Ali and Puerto Rican comedian Don Cholito (José Miguel Agrelot). According to Remezcla, during the match, Ali was momentarily distracted by Chacón's performance, which became one of the most talked-about moments of his visit to the island.

== In popular culture ==
In June 2023, Puerto Rican drag queen Jessica Wild impersonated Iris during the "Snatch Game of Love" challenge on the fifth episode of the eight season of the reality competition series RuPaul's Drag Race All Stars.

Iris is the subject of two songs: "Iris Chacon" on Buster Pointdexter's (the alter ego of actor/singer David Johansen) 1997 album "Buster's Spanish Rocketship" and "Iris Chacon", a Latin trap single released by Puerto Rican rapper Jon Z in 2020.

== See also ==
- List of Puerto Ricans
- Denissa Lopp
