= Marilyn Pupo =

Puerto Rican actress

- Born: November 23, 1950 (age 75); Santa Clara, Cuba
- Occupations: Actress; singer; show host
- Years active: 1970s–present
- Spouses: Chiqui Soldevilla (divorced) Eduardo Penedo (died 2021)

Marilyn Pupo (born November 23, 1950) is a Cuban-born Puerto Rican actress, singer and television show host. She is known for her stint as a television show host at Telemundo Puerto Rico's Noche de Gala alongside Eddie Miro, and for starring in the telenovela "El Idolo", also on that channel, alongside Jose Luis Rodriguez, during 1980 and 1981, as well as in other soap operas, such as "Maria Eugenia" and "Ambicion de Poder", where she starred alongside Martin Lantigua.

In 1974, Pupo had a short, special participation in the Mexican telenovela, Mundo de juguete. In 1978, Pupo participated in the Spanish-Panamanian film, "May I Borrow Your Girl Tonight?". In 1983, Pupo starred in the Dominican Republic comedy film, "Guaguasi", which was selected by that country as a prospective representative for the Oscars in the "best foreign language film" category but did not compete.

A noted theatrical actress, Pupo has also participated in more than ten theatrical productions in Puerto Rico, including "El Diario de Anna Frank" (about the life of young Dutch-German Jewish diarist Anne Frank), "Entre Amigas" and "El Club del Cementerio", the later two for which she received awards by the Puerto Rican Theater Critics' Circle. She also acted, during 2017, in "Titantos" alongside Puerto Rican television reporter Keylla Hernández, among four other actresses.

She was also the show host of a television show named "Estas Invitado" during the mid 1980s. Pupo has also hosted, alongside Rafael Jose, in the Puerto Rican version of the Muscular Dystrophy Association's telemarathon.

On 20 August, 2022, Pupo returned to theater, in a play named "La Peor Cantante del Mundo" ("The Worst Female Singer in the World"), where she played the role of Florence Foster Jenkins. In that play, she shared credits with Magali Carrasquillo and Braulio Castillo, hijo, among others.

== Personal life ==
Pupo was married for six years to Chiqui Soldevila, who died after divorcing her, during 2013 in a car crash in San Francisco, California. She and Soldevila were the parents of son Pedro Soldevila. Pupo also has a daughter named Ana Laura Penedo, who was adopted during her marriage to Eduardo Penedo, a Telemundo Puerto Rico and Teleonce executive who died on March 20, 2021.

== See also ==
- List of Cubans
- List of Puerto Ricans
