= Vivir Para Ti =

1982-83 Argentine-Puerto Rican soap opera

Vivir Para Ti is an Argentine-Puerto Rican telenovela from 1982 and 1983. It starred Argentine actor Pablo Alarcón and Puerto Rican actress Camille Carrion, with a soundtrack song, also titled "Vivir Para Ti", sung by Carrion's then-common law husband Glenn Monroig.

The show, which followed Yo Se Que Mentia's successful 1982 run, was shown on weekdays at Puerto Rican television's canal 4. Some fans and critics consider Vivir Para Ti to be the greatest telenovela ever produced in Puerto Rico.

Ulises Brenes and Lydia Echevarria were among the main antagonists, while a young Adamari Lopez made a special, two-chapter appearance. Puerto Rican actors Miguel Angel Suarez and Angela Meyer also participated.

== Plot ==
"General Murillo" (played by Puerto Rican-American actor Ulises Brenes) is a dictator of the fictitious Caribbean island of San Marcos, with great riches, a lavish mansion and a large military force at his disposal. He is used to have what he wants and to things going his way; he is also a despot and enjoys killing everyone who dares challenge him (including, on one instance, throwing Echevarria's character into quicksand and leaving her to die there).

The one thing Murillo cannot obtain, however, is the character of Carrion's love, a woman whom he deeply loves. Murillo will pull all the strings trying to conquer that woman's love, but soon, a savior (played by Alarcón) will come and try to take her away from Murillo's grasp and conquer her himself, setting up a rivalry between the two men.

== Cast ==
- Pablo Alarcón
- Camille Carrion
- Ulises Brenes - "General Francisco Murillo"
- Miguel Angel Suarez - "Mariano Rivera"
- Millie Aviles - "Marta"
- Amneris Morales
- Lucy Boscana - "Paca"
- Ricardo Bauleo
- Ivonne Goderich - "Sylvia"
- Leonardo Oliva - "Coronel Malariaga" (Murillo's second in-command)
- Luz María Rondón
- Delia Esther Quiñones
- Adamari Lopez
- Angela Meyer
- Myrna de Casenave
- José Félix Gómez
- Lydia Echevarria
- Ernesto Concepción
- Magali Carrasquillo
- Mercedes Sicardo
