= Jesús Álvarez (actor) =

Puerto Rican actor (born 1959)

Junior Alvarez
- Born: Jesus Emanuel Alvarez; December 20, 1959 (age 66); San Juan, Puerto Rico
- Years active: 1978-2024
- Spouse: Magdaly Cruz

Jesus Emanuel "Junior" Alvarez (born 20 December 1959 in San Juan, Puerto Rico) is a Puerto Rican former actor and comedian. A former teen idol in the island, Alvarez is known for his participation in such telenovelas as 1983's "Poquita Cosa", 1984's "Diana Carolina", Venezuela's "El Angel del Barrio" and Argentina's "Cuando es Culpable el Amor".

A prolific actor, comedian and director, Alvarez has, since the late 1970s, been best known by the Puerto Rican public as "Junior" Alvarez. In June 2024, he announced his retirement after 45 years as an actor.

== Early life ==
Alvarez was born in San Juan, By his late teens, he became interested in acting, and made his debut as an actor, in 1978, joining the theatrical company of Argentine playwright Carlos Ferrari.

== Professional career ==
Alvarez debuted as an actor in a play named "Puerto Rico Fua", where he acted along with Pedro Juan Texidor, Magali Carrasquillo, Luis Oliva, Edgardo Huertas and others. He then acted in other plays, namely "Mofongo con Ketchup" ("Mashed Fried Plantains With Ketchup"), "Amor en el Caserio" ("Love at the Residencial") and "La Puerca de Juan Bobo" ("Juan Bobo's Pig").

During the early 1980s, Alvarez was recruited by Martin Clutet to work on Clutet's directed telenovelas at canal 2, which allowed him to gain celebrity and become a teen idol in Puerto Rico. In 1980, Alvarez debuted on Puerto Rican television, acting as "Danny" in "Ariana", a telenovela in which Gladys Rodriguez and Arnaldo Andre of Paraguay starred.

Soon after, Alvarez acted in "El Idolo" alongside Venezuela's legendary singer Jose Luis Rodriguez and Cuban-Puerto Rican actress Marilyn Pupo. He also acted in "Viernes Social" ("Social Fridays") as "Ricky" and in "Maria Eugenia". His theater career also progressed, as he was involved in a number of plays, including "El Llamado de la Sangre" ("Blood Calling") and "La Cuarterona" ("The Quadroon"). Recognizing that his status as a teen idol was not going to last forever, Alvarez wanted to keep furthering his career, so he dedicated himself to acting both on stage and on television as a way to keep learning his craft.

In 1983, Alvarez moved to canal 2's main Puerto Rican television rival, canal 4. There, he acted in "Poquita Cosa" ("Little Thing"), which was starred by Mexican actor Oscar Morelli and by Puerto Rican actress Angela Meyer. Early in 1984, Alvarez acted in "Diana Carolina", where he shared credits with stars, Guillermo Davila of Venezuela and Puerto Rican actress Ivonne Goderich. In 1984, he also acted in "Tiempo de Vivir", which was another telenovela.

Alvarez flew to Venezuela, where he acted in a telenovela named "El Angel del Barrio"("Angel of the Slums"), and then in "Los Donatti", a controversial Venevision telenovela which caused the rage of a part of the Italian diaspora in Venezuela due to the way they were being depicted, and which Venevision then abruptly cancelled. Alvarez then traveled to Argentina to act in a telenovela named "Cuando es Culpable el Amor" ("When Love is Guilty"). He soon flew back to Puerto Rico, reestablishing himself in his country with participations in the classic "La Isla ("The Island"), "Ave de Paso" ("Just Flying By"), "Yara Prohibida" ("Yara the Prohibited Woman") and "La Otra" ("The other Woman").

There was a crisis on Puerto Rican television concerning telenovela productions in the late 80s; channels preferred to buy telenovelas produced elsewhere which were popular with television watchers and also cheaper than producing a telenovela locally; many actors, both Puerto Ricans and international ones who worked in Puerto Rico, where affected by the crisis; Alvarez was one of them. Alvarez moved to the United States, specifically to Florida, where he became a radio producer and had a radio show named "Hablando de Jazz" ("Speaking about Jazz"). He soon returned to Puerto Rico.

Alvarez immersed himself in theater acting when he returned to Puerto Rico, including 2001'a "Amor, Valor y Comprension y una Gozadita" ("Love, Valor and Understanding and a Small Joy") and "En Pelotas" ("Naked"), 2003's "Historias Desesperadas del Camerino" ("Desperate Stories off the Dressing Room"), 2005's "El Crimen del Padre Amaro" ("Father Amaro's Crime") and "Dito, Tan Bueno Que Era!" ("Dang, He Was Such a Good Person!" which was a comedy play), 2008's "Hairspray", in which he played "Edna Tumblad" and which gained him critical praise, and 2010's "S.S. Titanic".

Combining his theatrical career with one in film, Alvarez then acted in the theater version of August, Osage County, which was titled, for the Puerto Rican theater-going public, "Agosto, Condado de Osage", then in a movie named "El Beso que me Diste" ("That Kiss You Gave Me"), and the plays "Con el Agua Hasta el Cuello" ("With Water up to the Neck"), "M. Butterfly", "La Tia de Carlitos" ("Carlitos' Aunt"), "Mi Suegra Esta del Cara!" ("My Mother In Law Is Really Something Else!") and "Vamos a Contar Mentiras" ("Let's Tell Some Lies"). In 2010, Alvarez wrote a script for a film which was released as "Aventura Verde" ("Green Adventure"). Alvarez also gained some experience on Puerto Rican radio, when he joined Linnette Torres on her radio show, 11Q's "11Q en la Manana" ("11Q in the Morning"), a morning radio show, as co-host.

Alvarez joined the WAPA-TV (canal 4) midday television show "Mediodia Puerto Rico" ("Puerto Rico Midday"), where he worked alongside Jesse Calderon, as a comedian, playing the role of "Anibal", an overly sexual character, until 2009. He also played "Anibal" as a stand-up comedian at the Centro de Bellas Artes de Caguas in the central Puerto Rican city of Caguas and at Teatro La Perla in the southern Puerto Rican city of Ponce.

In 2022, Alvarezparticipated in the comedy "Los Foodtruckeros" ("The Food Truck Workers"), a film in which he shared credits with Francis Rosas, Rafael Jose, Carmen Lidya Velazquez and Jorge Antares, among others.

== Personal life and health problems ==
During 2022, Alvarez suffered a health setback when he had two episodes of heart failure. He was hospitalized and ended up with a weakened heart.

He is married to actress Magdaly Cruz.

== See also ==
- List of Puerto Ricans
