= Ivonne Goderich =

Puerto Rican actress and playwright

Ivonne del Rosario Goderich Gonzalez, better known as Ivonne Goderich (born 7 October, 1952) is a Puerto Rican actress, show host and playwright. Goderich is considered, along with Sully Diaz, Von Marie Mendez, Millie Aviles and Giselle Blondet, as one of the five queens of the telenovela genre in Puerto Rico during the 1980s. Of the five, Goderich was the only one who worked for Canal 4 at the time, as the other four worked for Canal 2 instead.

== Early life ==
Goderich was born in Santurce, an area of Puerto Rico's capital, San Juan. She was born to Ivan Goderich, a Cuban soap opera musical director, and Esther Sandoval (née Gonzalez), a Puerto Rican actress. As a young girl, Ivonne studied dance and, as a teenager, she formed part of a ballet company as a dancer.

But her interests did not include a future in the world of entertainment as of yet. Goderich attended the University of Puerto Rico, where she gained two degrees: one in art's history and another one in teaching. Goderich became a model and acted in several television commercials in order to pay for her university studies. Goderich's mother, Esther Sandoval, noticed her daughter's talent for acting but, as a demanding mother, she demanded that Goderich do her best acting when she acted in these commercials.

== Professional actress ==
Goderich was given a chance to act in a theatrical play named "La Malquerida" ("The Unloved One"). She was discovered by WAPA-TV producers while acting in theater, and soon, she signed up with that television station. Her television debut came in a telenovela named "La Mentira" ("The Lie"). Goderich later participated in the 1982 classic, "Vivir Para Ti" ("Living for You"), in which she acted alongside Angela Meyer, Lydia Echevarria, Pablo Alarcon, Camille Carrion and others. This was followed by her participation in "Poquita Cosa" ("Little Thing").

In 1984, Goderich was contracted by Venevision, a Venezuela-based major, international television channel, to star in a telenovela named "Diana Carolina", where she played the titular role, alongside Guillermo Davila, who played her romantic interest. That telenovela was a major international hit. "Diana Carolina" was a United States (Univision)-Venezuela co-production; scenes were recorded in both Venezuela and Puerto Rico.

The success of "Diana Carolina", both in Puerto Rico and in Venezuela, led Goderich to accept another offer with Venevision, so she moved to Venezuela in order to record a telenovela named ""El Angel del Barrio" ("Angel of the Slums"), a telenovela that was not as successful as "Diana Carolina".

Goderich returned to her native island-country and soon, she participated in another Puerto Rican telenovela, this one named "Tiempo de Vivir" ("Time to Live"), which was written by the famed actor, director and writer Jacobo Morales. According to sources, Goderich experienced a bad treatment from fellow participants in that telenovela, which convinced her to return to Venezuela one more time, to act in a telenovela named "Los Donatti" ("The Donattis"), shortly before returning permanently to Puerto Rico, where she decided to stay.

== Show host ==
Goderich was for a time during the 80s, part of the show hosting team of "A Millon", a game-show that was the first program of its kind in Puerto Rico and which was a major ratings hit on the island, and in which she shared hosting responsibilities with Hector Marcano and Rafael Jose. After returning to Puerto Rico following her participation in "Los Donatti", she hosted a youth-oriented television show named "A toda Maquina" ("Going At it With Everything"), which was shown on Canal 6, Puerto Rico's government's station.

== Theater ==
As a theater actress, she has also acted in many theatrical plays. During 2022, her play, "Vivir..en Los Tiempos Del Jaiba" ("Living...During the Crab Times"), began at the Centro de Bellas Artes in San Juan. The play is about Puerto Ricans who live in condominiums and their situations in daily life. Goderich also acts in this play.

== See also ==
- List of Puerto Ricans
- History of women in Puerto Rico
