= Sharon Riley =

Puerto Rican actress and singer (born 1946)

- Born: 7 November 1946 (age 79); Santurce, San Juan, Puerto Rico
- Occupations: Television, theater and film actress, singer, director
- Notable credit: "Perfume de Gardenias"
- Children: 1 (Sylvia Peréz)

Sharon Riley Rexach (Note: In this Spanish name, the first or paternal surname is Riley and the second or maternal family name is Rexach.) (born November 7, 1946) is a Puerto Rican actress and singer, who has been featured in several telenovelas on Puerto Rican television.

== Early life ==
Riley was born on Santurce in 1946, the daughter of American United States Army officer William Riley and of the legendary Puerto Rican singer, poet and composer Sylvia Rexach.

Riley did not have a happy home life: she remembers how, as a child, many times she had to call the police, allegedly due to her father's violence towards her famous mother. Due in part to the lax domestic violence laws of the time, he wasn't arrested. She was traumatized by her dad's alleged actions towards her mom.

She gained initial fame as a child star, when as a seven-year-old in 1954, she was hired to play an orphan in one of the first major Puerto Rican television sitcom hits, "La Taverna India", where Riley acted alongside Ramón Rivero, "Diplo". She played "Diplo"s unofficially adopted daughter, whom he had to hide from an orphanage official every time the official came to the tavern to look for the little girl.

Early in Riley's teenagerhood, her mom died of cancer; this caused Riley's aunts to send her to a Franciscan nuns' internship in Buffalo, New York, from which she returned to Puerto Rico late in the 1960s, to study drama at the University of Puerto Rico under teacher, the also legendary playwright Dean Zayas.

== Later acting career ==
Riley followed her return to Puerto Rico by beginning what would turn out to be a prolific theater acting career: she debuted on a play named "Panorama Desde el Puente" ("View From the Bridge") and followed her participation in that with appearances in "Un Tranvía Llamado Deseo" ("A Streetcar Named Desire"), "Sabor a Miel" ("Tastes Like Honey") and "El Efecto de los Rayos Gamma Sobre la Flor Maravilla" ("The Effect of Gamma Rays on Man-in-the-Moon Marigolds").

Soon, Riley was hired by Tommy Muniz to act in his telenovela production, "Las Almas no Tienen Color" ("Souls Have no Color") and "Los Hijos no Condenan" ("Kids Don't Condemn")

Riley's acting career took her beyond Puerto Rico early in the 1970s; she was signed by Panamericana Television in Peru to act in a telenovela named "Natacha".

After returning to Puerto Rico following that stint in South America, Riley re-established herself in her home-country as a theater actress, participating in a recital at the "Ocho Puertas" nightclub, in which she sang songs written by her mom, Sylvia Rexach.

Due largely to personal problems (explained below), Riley stayed largely retired from television for about ten years, but she kept busy as a theatrical actress when the decade of the 1980s arrived. She also formed part of a singing group named "Las Bohemias" ("The Bohemians", later known as "Las Bohemias en Hi-Fi"), before joining, in 1986, such well known actresses like Camille Carrion, Angela Meyer, Margot Deben and Magali Carrasquillo in a Canal 11 television talk show named "Ellas al Mediodia" ("Women at Midday").

Another time she played her mother Silvya Rexach was when she was given the opportunity to characterize her in a television mini-series named "Hasta el Fondo del Dolor" ("To The Bottom of the Suffering").

Riley returned to theater as the 1990s rolled around, acting in such plays as "A Medio Peso el Cuba Libre" ("Cuba Libres for Half a Dollar"), 1994s "Mujeres de Ojos Grandes" ("Big-Eyed Women") and 1995s "La Boila" ("The Noble Woman"). Due in part to her daughter's health problems (see below), Riley and her daughter Silvya moved, in the mid-1990s, to the United States' state of Florida, where Riley worked as an acting teacher.

In 1999, Riley formed the "El Escenario" ("The Stage") theatrical company in Florida.

During 2001, Riley debuted as a director, with a children's play named "El Plumaje del Mǘcaro" (""The Puerto Rican Owl's Feathers"), which was played at the Osceola Center for the Arts in Kissimmee, Florida.

Ever since, she has been semi-retired, but she has returned to acting sporadically, such as in 2001s "Dos Criaturas de la Ternura" ("Two Creatures of Tenderness") and 2004s "Una Noche Con Silvya" ("A Night with Silvya"), which is also about her mom.

In 2021, Riley made her feature film debut, in a movie titled "Perfume de Gardenias" ("Gardenias Perfume"), alongside one of her childhood heroes, Luz María Rondón.

== Personal life ==
Sharon Riley has a daughter named Sylvia Peréz, who is named after Riley's mom, Sylvia Rexach. Her daughter suffered from birth complications, in her case, a form of Anoxia, which lead to a large settlement awarded to Riley and her daughter in 1983. The settlement amount issue took long to resolve, and it wasn't until the 1990s that the parties involved reached an agreement as far as to how much Riley and her daughter were going to receive from what took place during Sylvia's birth.

Riley had to have a periodical retirement from television work in order to better care for her daughter, who in time grew to become an independent adult.

As of 2013, her daughter Sylvia had reunited to live with her mom again, and the pair made Orlando, Florida, their hometown.

She lists fellow Puerto Rican actress Luz María Rondón as one of her early acting influences.

== See also ==
- List of Puerto Ricans
- Irish immigration to Puerto Rico
