= Óscar Morelli =

Mexican actor

Oscar Morelli, born Oscar Bonfiglio Mouet (February 4, 1936, in Guaymas, Sonora – June 6, 2005, in Mexico City), was a Mexican actor.

Morelli debuted as an actor in the 1960s working in radio, theater, television and film. He was also a director and sports writer. In 1983, Morelli starred in the Puerto Rican canal 4's production, Poquita Cosa, a telenovela in which he shared credits with co-protagonist Angela Meyer, with Junior Alvarez, Yolandita Monge, Myrna de Casenave, Amneris Morales and Pedro Orlando Torres, among other Puerto Rican show-business legends. Participation in this soap opera gave Morelli fame in Puerto Rico.

== Personal life ==
The son of Óscar Bonfiglio (military and goalkeeper of the national football team of Mexico) and Mercedes Mouet, Óscar Morelli studied in the Military School of Mexico and acting with Andrés Soler and Seki Sano. He married actress María Eugenia Rios on June 2, 1958, with whom he had four children: Óscar (actor), Andrés (actor, singer), Gustavo and María Eugenia.

Morelli died on June 6, 2005, due to pulmonary problems in the Santelena Hospital in Mexico City, at the age of 69. He wasn't able to complete his last role as an actor in the telenovela Contra viento y marea. His remains rest in the Nuevo Jardín cemetery in Mexico City. He is remembered as one of the greatest actors in Mexican Cinema.

== Selected filmography ==
- The Partisan of Villa (1967)
