= Magali Carrasquillo =

Puerto Rican actress

Magali Carrasquillo (born on a January 17) is a Puerto Rican film and television actress. She is also a teacher, television producer and cultural manager. During the 1980s, she was known for her participation in many telenovelas in her island-country of Puerto Rico.

== Early life ==
Carrasquillo born in Caguas, Puerto Rico is the daughter of Alfredo Carrasquillo, who was a dentist.

As a young woman, Carrasquillo enrolled at the Universidad de Puerto Rico, where she studied theater, humanity arts and Hispanic studies. She later studied where she obtained a postgraduate degree from the Universidad Autonoma del Estado de Morelos in Cuernavaca, Morelos.

Carrasquillo was working in Argentine theater producer Carlos Ferrari's well-known play, "Puerto Rico fua!" during 1979, when she met her future husband, singer, show host, dentist and comedian Rafael Jose Diaz.

== Acting career ==
Island-wide celebrity came for her about that time, as she soon began acting in some canal 4 telenovelas that were seen by large audiences in the 1980s. Among the best known telenovelas that Carrasquillo participated in are "Yara Prohibida" and "Vivir Para Ti" ("Living For You"), the latter in which she shared credits with other well-known actors such as Pablo Alarcon, Camille Carrion, Lydia Echevarria, Ulises Brenes, Adamari Lopez and Amneris Morales, among others.

Later in the 1980s, Carrasquillo became a talk-show host, participating in "Cultura Viva" ("Live Culture") and in the major Puerto Rican television hit, "Ellas al Mediodia", ("Women at Midday") a canal 11 women-hosted talk show in which she shared hosting responsibilities with, among others, Angela Meyer, Gladys Rodriguez, Marilyn Pupo and Margot Deben.

She followed her initial, television success with a film acting career that included a number of Puerto Rican film productions, such as "Luisa Capetillo, Pasion de Justicia" ("Luisa Capetillo, Passion for Justice"), "El Sueño del Regreso" ("Dream of Returning"), "Kabo y Platon" ("Corporal and Platoon") and "Quien Eres Tu?" ("Who Are You?").

Carrasquillo has won several acting awards; in 1988 and 1994, she was recognized as best antagonist actress by the Puerto Rico Theater Critics' Circle.

In 2023, Carrasquillo starred in the Puerto Rican film "La Pecera" ("The Fish Tank") alongside fellow veteran Puerto Rican actress, Georgina Borri.

== Teaching career ==
A teacher also, Carrasquillo has been busy on the Puerto Rican education system, and she has worked as a teacher in Spanish and Teather and Communications classes, among others.

== Personal life ==
Carrasquillo met Rafael Jose Diaz in 1979; the couple married in 1981 and divorced in 1989 but they remain lifelong friends.

Carrasquillo had a son with Jose, the actor and singer Juan Pablo Diaz.

== See also ==
- List of Puerto Ricans
