= Mercedes Sicardo =

Spaniard-Puerto Rican actress (1927-2018)

- Born: September 24, 1927; Madrid, Spain
- Died: April 28, 2018 (age 90); San Juan, Puerto Rico
- Occupation: Television actress
- Spouse: Jose Luis Marrero

Mercedes Sicardo Carderera (September 24, 1927 -April 28, 2018) was a Spaniard-Puerto Rican actress of film, theater and television. She was best known for her participation in many telenovelas in Puerto Rico.

== Early life ==
Sicardo was born in Madrid, the daughter of a Puerto Rican soldier named José Sicardo, who was a colonel at the Spanish Army, and of a Spaniard mother named Mariana Carderera, but in 1940, when she was almost a teenager, her family decided to immigrate to Puerto Rico, after the rise of Francisco Franco to power in the southern European country.

The trip to Puerto Rico was a long and arduous one for the Sicardo-Carderera family. They first had to stop in Alicante, where they lived for some time until they boarded a ship to the Caribbean Sea, arriving first in the French territory island of Guadeloupe, before getting to their final destination of Puerto Rico on May 25, 1940. In her new country, young Sicardo met Rene Marques, and soon her new friend invited her to form part of the "Ateneo Puertorriqueno", where she began her acting career.

== Career ==
Sicardo quickly established herself as a leading actress in the Caribbean country. By 1950, she began a theatrical career that was prolific, and saw her participate in plays like "Tres Hermanas" ("Three Sisters"), "Rio Abajo" ("Down River") and "Las Espigas Miran al Cielo" ("The Spikes Look to the Heavens"), among others.

Soon, television debuted in Puerto Rico, and Sicardo became well acquainted with the Puerto Rican public from outside San Juan by way of the new medium. Sicardo's celebrity took off as she acted in telenovelas such as "Lucecita", "Esa Mujer" ("That Woman") and "Juan de Dios" ("John of God").

Later on, as an older woman, Sicardo kept a prolific acting schedule, being showcased on many canal 2 telenovelas, such as "Cristina Bazan", "Tanairi" and others. She also worked at many canal 4 telenovela productions, namely "Yo Se Que Mentia" ("I Know he was Lying") alongside Daniel Guerrero and Iris Chacon, and "Vivir Para Ti" ("Living for You"), alongside Pablo Alarcon and Camille Carrion, among others. She also participated in the Mexico-Puerto Rico co-production named "Modelos S.A." ("Model Company"). As she aged, Sicardo started taking grandmotherly-type roles on these telenovelas.

== Personal life ==
Sicardo was married for many years to actor Josė Luis Marrero, who died in 2009.

== Death ==
She was buried at Santa María Magdalena de Pazzis Cemetery.

Puerto Rican governor Ricardo Rossello declared a day of mourning to commemorate her death.

== See also ==
- List of Puerto Ricans
- List of Spaniards
