= Mario Pabón =

Dominican-Puerto Rican actor, director and television show host

Mario Pabón, in full Mario Enrique Pabón Cantin (13 August 1930 – 27 November 1996) was a Dominican-Puerto Rican actor, director and show host. He was known for his work on Puerto Rican television and cinema.

== Early life ==
Pabón was born in Quisqueya, San Pedro de Macorís Province, Dominican Republic, the son of Melba Cantin Rovira (born in San Pedro de Macorís, Dominican Republic, to Oscar Cantin, a Swiss American from Louisiana, and Angelina Rovira Carbó, a Puerto Rican from Arroyo) and Mario Pabón Urrutia (from Llanos Costa, Cabo Rojo, Puerto Rico). At the age of thirteen, he and his family moved to San Juan, Puerto Rico, where he enrolled at the Baldorioty de Castro High School in San Juan.

His family were wealthy landowners from the Dominican Republic who left the country during the dictatorship of Rafael Trujillo.

Pabón later on moved to New York City, where he began studying engineering. However, his girlfriend, Puerto Rican woman Nelly Catala, suffered a fall on snow and she returned to Puerto Rico. Feeling lonely, Pabón returned to Puerto Rico to be with Catala after having won a singing contest which provided an airplane ticket to San Juan as a prize.

== Show business career ==
Pabón immediately went about establishing a showbusiness career upon his return to Puerto Rico, combining it with a side career as engineer's helper. He was hired to form part of a radio show hosted by Rafael Quinones Vidal after winning a contest on Quiñones Vidal's radio show. Soon, the well established actor, Edmundo Rivera Alvarez, inspired him to pursue a career in the professional acting field.

Pabón initially collaborated in the acting field with such luminaries as Mercedes Sicardo's husband, Jose Luis Marrero, and Maria Judith Franco. Soon after, he was hired to participate on the Puerto Rican radio adaptation of "The Cisco Kid" and then, a television break came in the form of a show named "Esta Es Mi Suegra" ("This is my Mother in Law") which was a comedy show.

Pabón decided to return to New York to study direction at the School of Radio Technique and Television there, and joined La Voz de America radio station in the city, working alongside Vicente Tovar at the station.

Another chance came for Pabón when La Voz de America decided to move to Washington, D.C. but Pabón chose to stay behind in New York, taking a job as a teacher's assistant at the School of Radio Technique and Television. Angel Ramos, the Puerto Rican industrialist and director of El Mundo and of Telemundo Puerto Rico, also began working at the S.R.T.T. Ramos offered Pabón the opportunity to return to Puerto Rico as a television director.

Pabón returned to Puerto Rico, and soon became the director of a children's show named "El Payaso Pinito" ("Pinito the Clown") and other, adult-audiences oriented shows named "El Show Libby's" and "La Taberna India" ("The India Tavern"; both of the latter shows named for advertising reasons). Pabón was then given an opportunity to appear in front of the cameras for the second time, when he acted in a series of mini-telenovelas that were sponsored by the Colgate-Palmolive and Fab detergent brands. Telemundo was pleased with the young man's talents and so, Pabón was then signed to one of the first exclusivity contracts in Puerto Rico, increasing his acting opportunities and therefore, his celebrity status in the Caribbean island-nation, Pabón appearing in over 30 telenovelas over the next decades, including classics such as "El Derecho de Nacer" ("The Right to be Born") and acting alongside legends like Marta Romero, Gladys Aguayo, Argentine Helena Montalban and Gladys Rodriguez. Pabon and Rodriguez formed one of the Puerto Rican television viewers' favorite staged romantic couples of their era.

Around this time, Pabón made his film debut, acting in the Puerto Rican production, "Maruja" alongside Marta Romero and the German-Puerto Rican actor Axel Anderson. The trio became friends and they joined forces to form a theater company named "Teatro la Mascara" ("The Mask Theater Company"). Meanwhile, Pabón's television career continued, with him acting in several telenovelas as well as directing shows such as "Teleteatro Fab" ("Fab Tele-theater"), "Luis Vigoreaux Presenta" ("Luis Vigoreaux Presents", where Pabón directed the legendary show host Luis Vigoreaux) and "Show Ford" (named, for advertising purposes, after the American car brand). Pabón was also active directing several television commercials during this era.

Pabón then became friends with another popular Puerto Rican entertainer and television personality, show host Camilo Delgado. The couple formed another company, named Marcam Productions, and they began producing shows for Rikavision, Canal 7, including a show, "Sabado Gigantes" (not to be confused with Don Francisco's Sabado Gigante show) in which Cuban-Puerto Rican actress Marilyn Pupo participated.

In 1986, barely recuperating from a heart operation, Pabón played the main character in a miniseries named "Las Divorciadas" ("The Divorced Women"), where he was reunited with his old, on-screen couple Helena Montalbán of Argentina.

Pabón also produced "La Fuga" ("The Escape") a major mini-series starred by Walter Rodriguez and Jaime Bello.

Pabón wound up his show business career as show host of a Canal 6 show named "Buenas Tardes" ("Good Afternoon") along with the experienced Puerto Rican television personality Myrna Escabi, and of "Desde el Centro de Bellas Artes" ("From Centro de Bellas Artes"), which was a music concerts show. He also acted in the classic Puerto Rican race-themed miniseries "Color de Piel".

== Personal life and death ==
Pabón was married to Nelly Catala of Puerto Rico. The couple had a daughter, the well-known actress Marian Pabón.

Mario Pabón died on 27 November, 1996, at the age of 66.

== See also ==
- List of people from the Dominican Republic
- List of Puerto Ricans
