= Lucy Boscana =

Puerto Rican actress

- Lucy Boscana portrait
- Born: Lucila Boscana Bravo; September 24, 1915; Mayagüez, Puerto Rico
- Died: May 24, 2001 (aged 85); San Juan, Puerto Rico
- Occupation: Actress
- Years active: 1950–2001

Lucila Boscana Bravo (September 24, 1915 – May 24, 2001), known professionally as Lucy Boscana, was a Puerto Rican actress and a pioneer in Puerto Rico's television industry.

== Early years ==
Boscana was born in the city of Mayagüez which is located on the west coast of Puerto Rico. Her family moved to the United States when she was a child because of the economic crisis in the island. She learned how to play the piano at an early age. Boscana graduated from Academia de la Inmaculada Concepción high school and decided to continue her education by enrolling in Oberlin College located in Ohio, where her cousin, Madeline Willemsen, was studying a French language degree. There she earned her bachelor's degree in languages and theater.

== Acting career ==
In 1940, Boscana returned to Puerto Rico. After a stint as an English language teacher in her hometown she enrolled in the University of Puerto Rico to study music and dramatic arts. After graduation, Boscana founded the Puerto Rican Tablado Company, a traveling theater. Among the plays which she produced with the company was "The Oxcart" by fellow Puerto Rican playwright René Marqués. She presented the play in Puerto Rico and on Off-Broadway in New York City. Boscana participated in over 30 plays and also in various locally produced films. In 1950, she was part of the musical vocal group from Ponce: Las Damiselas, (The Ladies), with Sylvia Rexach, and Marta Romero.

On August 22, 1955, Boscana became a pioneer in the television of Puerto Rico when she participated in Puerto Rico's first telenovela (soap opera) titled Ante la Ley, alongside Esther Sandoval and Mario Pabón, which was broadcast by Telemundo, Puerto Rico. Since then she became a regular in the telenovela circuit.

With the Puerto Rican Tablado Company, she produced and presented the works of Francisco Arrivi, Rene Marquez, Tennessee Williams, Alejandro Casona, Federico García Lorca and many others in Puerto Rico.

== Honors ==
In 1996, the Puerto Rican Institute of Culture dedicated its 33 International Theater Festival to Boscana. In July 1997, the Puerto Rican Senate paid tribute and awarded Boscana and her Puerto Rican Tablado Company with a special proclamation recognizing their silver anniversary.

In 2000, the Government of Puerto Rico honored Boscana by renaming the Teatro del Patio of the Puerto Rican Institute of Culture El Teatro Lucy Boscana, (The Lucy Boscana Theater). In 2008, the main stage of the Teatro Yagüez in Mayagüez was also dedicated to her. Lucy Boscana died on May 24, 2001, in San Juan, Puerto Rico and her remains rest at Cementerio Santa Magdalena de Pazzis in that city.

== See also ==
- List of Puerto Ricans
- Marta Romero
- Sylvia Rexach
- History of women in Puerto Rico
