= Elia Enid Cadilla =

Puerto Rican television and film actress

- Born: July 11, 1944 (age 81); San Juan, Puerto Rico
- Occupations: Television and film actress, television journalist, producer, show host

Elia Enid Cadilla Sulsona (born July 11, 1944, in San Juan, Puerto Rico) is a Puerto Rican actress, producer, television news reporter and television show host.

== Early life ==
Cadilla's parents were both involved in show business: her mother was the poet Elia Sulsona, and her father was the Orquesta Sinfonica de Puerto Rico musician José Armindo Cadilla.

As a little girl, Cadilla visited the radio station, WKBM, often to accompany her mom, who worked there. During one of those visits, Cadilla, aged four, had a chance to substitute an actress who had not shown up to work that day. After being read, by her mom, what the other actress had to say on the air, Cadilla memorized the lines and repeated them live, effectively beginning, without knowing it yet, her professional acting career.

Cadilla began taking ballet lessons; this allowed the buddying young entertainer to work in theater and in commercials, at an age in which she saw her new career as a side-hobby.

Cadilla grew into a very intelligent young woman; she was accepted into the Universidad de Puerto Rico's honor mathematics program. She was also accepted by that university's natural sciences' department and took humanities as well as general sciences and business administration courses. at UPR, Cadilla figured out that her true passion lay in the profession of acting.

After graduating from college, Cadilla went on to studying dramatic arts with the famed Puerto Rican television actor Edmundo Rivera Alvarez and with Maricusa Ornés. She also took dancing classes, looking to further her knowledge of the art of ballet under professor María Teresa Miranda. Around that era, Cadilla also got work as a professional model, which helped her first get noticed by Puerto Rican television producers.

== Entertainment career ==
Cadilla was soon signed by the Puerto Rican television channel, canal 7. She was featured on a comedy show named "Rikalocuras". Noticed by the legendary actor and producer Paquito Cordero, she then moved to canal 2. Parallel to her television career, Cadilla began a theater acting career during that era, participating in plays by Walter Rodriguez and Victoria Espinoza, among others.

Cadilla moved to the United States during the 1970s, setting in New York. She worked in theater there, winning an Ace Award and a medal from the Puerto Rican Theater Circle as "best actress" there.

Cadilla returned to Puerto Rico in the mid-1980s, and she was hired by canal 4, where she became a show host of a morning television news show named "Hoy" ("Today"), where she worked alongside Angel Oliveras and Luis Francisco Ojeda. She was also hired to work as an entertainment news reporter at that network's afternoons news show, "Noticentro 4".

Cadilla later joined a major Puerto Rican television hit talk show, named "Ellas al Mediodia" ("Women at Midday"), which was shown on canal 11. At that show, she joined forces with Angela Meyer, Margot Debén and other Puerto Rican female television legends. The show also had a theatrical edition named "Múltiple Ellas" in which Cadilla participated. During the late 1980s, Cadilla acted in and produced a telenovela named "La Isla" ("The Island"). For her acting at "La Isla", she was awarded two prestigious awards, the Agǔeybaná and El Cemí awards.

Alongside her television and theater acting, television reporting and show-hosting careers, she launched a film acting career, participating in several Puerto Rican films, such as 1975's "Machos", 1976's "Adiós, Nueva York, Adiós" ("Goodbye, New York, Goodbye") and 1986's "A Flor de Piel" ("Skin Deep"). She would later participate in 1998's film, "Angelito Mío" ("My Little Angel").

An imitator also, Cadilla, who is of Caucasian descent, has imitated, among others, the well-known African American singing legend, Tina Turner on theater plays.

In 2004, she participated in a film named "Fascination".

=== Social causes taken ===
Cadilla has involved herself with some social causes from time to time. These include being part of a group named "Ama a tu Gente, Conserva a tu Ambiente" ("Love Your People, Protect Your Habitat"), with which she participated in conferences and in public town cleaning up and urban reforestation activities; and another project which involves taking theatrical plays to female jails in Puerto Rico. In the latter, she has been involved for about two decades.

== See also ==
- List of Puerto Ricans
