= Mi Encuentro =

Studio album by Yolandita Monge
- Released: April 8, 1997
- Recorded: New York
- Genre: Latin
- Label: WEA-Latina / ARDC Music Division
- Producer: Sergio George

Yolandita Monge chronology
Yolandita (1995)	Mi Encuentro (1997)	Siento (1999)

Mi Encuentro (My Encounter) is the twenty-second studio album by Puerto Rican singer Yolandita Monge, released in 1997 and her last production for WEA-Latina. The album marked another radical change of sound for the singer, which included bomba and plena arrangements. For this release, Monge worked with producer Sergio George, the mastermind behind La India and Marc Anthony 1990's tropical albums. The album contains two songs from Puerto Rican singer-songwriter Glenn Monroig, "Yo Solamente", and "Vete Ya".

Monge recorded the previous hits "Cierra Los Ojos Y Juntos Recordemos" (from Floreciendo!) and "Ahora, Ahora" (from Laberinto de Amor) with these new arrangements. In the liner notes Monge express that it was her longtime desire to record songs with the sounds of her native land. The album earned Gold record status in Puerto Rico.

== Track listing ==
Track	Title	Composer(s)	Length
01	"Susususubir"	Guadalupe García, Sergio George	04:22
02	"Yo Solamente"	Glenn Monroig	04:33
03	"Cierra Los Ojos Y Juntos Recordemos"	Eduardo Franco	04:41
04	"Sólo Recuerdos"	Ramón Rodríguez	05:03
05	"Tal Para Cual"	Donato Poveda	04:56
06	"Bomba Medley" Featuring DLG ("Maquinolandera"/"Yo Soy Del Campo"/"Alegría Bomba Eh!"/"Bomba Carai Bomba")"	Michael Okrum, P. Salazar, Miguel Flores, Manuel Gross, David Madden	05:08
07	"Devuélveme El Amor"	Guadalupe García, Sergio George	04:49
08	"Ahora, Ahora"	Cristiano Malgioglio, Gian Pietro Felisatti, María R. Ovelar, Yolandita Monge	04:46
09	"Contraste"	Angel Serrano	04:40
10	"Vete Ya"	Glenn Monroig	05:21

=== 2017 iTunes version ===
Track	Title	Composer(s)	Length
1	"Susususubir"	Guadalupe García, Sergio George	4:21
2	"Cierra Los Ojos Y Juntos Recordemos"	Eduardo Franco	4:40
3	"Devuélveme El Amor"	Guadalupe García, Sergio George	4:48
4	"Vete Ya"	Glenn Monroig	5:20
5	"Yo Solamente"	Glenn Monroig	4:32
6	"Sólo Recuerdos"	Ramón Rodríguez	5:02
7	"Tal Para Cual"	Donato Poveda	4:55
8	"Ahora, Ahora"	Cristiano Malgioglio, Gian Pietro Felisatti, María R. Ovelar, Yolandita Monge	4:45
9	"Contraste"	Angel Serrano	4:39
10	"Bomba Medley" featuring DLG ("Maquinolandera"/"Yo Soy Del Campo"/"Alegría Bomba Eh!"/"Bomba Carai Bomba")"	Michael Okrum, P. Salazar, Miguel Flores, Manuel Gross, David Madden	5:07

== Credits and personnel ==
- Vocals: Yolandita Monge
- Producer: Sergio George
- Associate Producer: William Cepeda
- Arrangements: Sergio George
- Recorded: Sir Sound, Inc., New York
- Engineer: Charlie Dos Santos
- Assistants: Jeff Crews, Mario De Jesús
- Mixing: Charlie Dos Santos, Sergio George
- Piano & Drum Programming: Sergio George
- Timbals & Bongó: Marc Quiñones
- Congas & Percussion: Juan 'Papo' Pepín
- Timbals: Rafael 'Tito' De Gracia
- Percussion: Jesús Cepeda, Luis Daniel Cepeda, Roberto Cepeda
- Tambourine: Héctor 'Tito' Matos
- Bass: Rubén Rodríguez
- Guitars: Bernd Schoenhart
- Trumpets: Davis 'Piro' Rodríguez, Chris Rogers, Barry Danelien
- Trombone: William Cepeda, Luis Bonilla, Ozzie Melémdez, Chris Washburn
- Sax: Bobby Franceschini
- Flute: Karen Joseph
- Chorus: Luis Cabarcas, Huey Dunbar, Gabriela Anders, Milton Cardona, Ramón Rodríguez, Cita Rodríguez, Sergio George
- Photography: Fernando Báez, Omar Cruz
- Cover Design: Arte Gráfico Y...

== Notes ==
- Track listing and credits from album booklet.
- Released in cassette format in 1997 (18410-4).
- Released digitally by ARDC Music Division on October 27, 2017, with the track listing in a different order.

== Charts ==
=== Album ===
Chart (1997)	Peak position
US Top Latin Albums (Billboard)	38
US Tropical Albums (Billboard)	6
US Latin Pop Albums (Billboard)	11

=== Singles ===
Year	Song	Chart	Peak
1997	"Susususubir"	US Hot Latin Songs (Billboard)	25
1997	"Susususubir"	US Latin Pop Airplay (Billboard)	9
1997	"Susususubir"	US Tropical Airplay (Billboard)	5
1997	"Yo Solamente"	US Tropical Airplay (Billboard)	18
