= Helena Montalban =

Argentine-Puerto Rican actress (1926-1991)

- Born: Helena Monkobodsky; 15 May 1926; Bahia Blanca, Argentina
- Died: 2 March 1991 (age 64); Hato Rey, Puerto Rico
- Occupations: Actress, producer, show host
- Years active: 1934–1989
- Spouse(s): Axel Anderson (divorced), Fernando Castroman (her death)

Helena Montalban (also Elena Montalban; 15 May 1926 in Bahia Blanca, Argentina — 2 March 1991 in Hato Rey, Puerto Rico) was an Argentine-Puerto Rican theater, film and telenovela actress, producer and talk show host. Montalban, who also worked as an actress in Colombia and the Dominican Republic, is best known for her telenovela work in the Caribbean country of Puerto Rico.

== Early life ==
Montalban was born Helena Monkobodsky in Bahia Blanca, to Moises Monkobodsky, a tailor, and his wife Yustine. The Monkobodsky's were Polish-Jewish immigrants to Argentina.

When Montalban was eight, her family moved to Buenos Aires. In that port city, Montalban took an interest in dramatic arts and began studying acting from a young age. She would act in several school plays.

== Career ==
Montalban joined a theater company named "La Mascara" (not to be confused with the later company which was headed by her future husband, actor Axel Anderson, and by Mario Pabón, which she also joined).

In 1953, Montalban, by then linked romantically to Anderson, ventured to Colombia, where she became one of that country's first television stars. From Colombia, the pair traveled to the Dominican Republic in 1954, when they became among the first stars of the Canal 4 television channel, Radio Television Dominicana, remaining there until 1955, when they made their way to Puerto Rico. Montalban and Anderson had also participated in theater plays at both Colombia and the Dominican Republic.

Arriving in Puerto Rico, Montalban and Anderson were offered a contract by Angel Ramos of Telemundo Canal 2, to star in a sitcom named "Que Pareja!" ("What a Couple!"). Soon, Montalban starred on one of the first Puerto Rican telenovela hits, "Soraya", where she played the titular "Soroya", alongside Puerto Rican actor Braulio Castillo.

In 1957, Montalban and boyfriend Axel Anderson decided to establish a theatrical company in Puerto Rico; along with Mario Pabón, Braulio Castillo and Raul Davila; they formed this company, which they named after the first company Montalban had formed part of, "La Mascara" ("The Mask"). The troupe began touring all over Puerto Rico, including stops at Yaguez Theater in the western city of Mayaguez, Teatro La Perla in the southern city of Ponce and Teatro Arcelay in the central city of Caguas. with a play named "Sobre el Pecado, el Amor" ("Love Over Sin"), which starred her as well as several other local actors, including Pabon, Orlando Rodriguez and Gilda Galan.

Around this era, Montalban was also beginning to act in films, as she and Victor Arrillaga formed a film company named "Probo Films", which recorded "Maruja", which was a major hit in Latin America. In "Maruja", Montalban starred alongside Mario Pabon.

Montalban became entrenched in the Puerto Rican cinema scene, starring in various films recorded in her adopted country; one of those films was 1963's "Palmer ha Muerto" ("Palmer has Died").

Her telenovela acting career also stayed afloat, as she participated in many Canal 2 productions, such as "El Derecho de Nacer" alongside Mario Pabon, "La Gata" ("The Cat") which lasted from 1961 to 1962 and in which she acted with Braulio Castillo as her on-screen couple, 1963's "La Red" ("The Network") and 1964's "Historia de tres hermanas" ("A Story of Three Sisters").

By 1968, Montalban and Anderson, already a married couple, established a location for "Teatro La Mascara" at Parada 20 in Santurce, at the offices of the Teatro de la Autoridad de Comunicaciones. From 1960 to 1981, the couple produced plays at Teatro Tapia and, later, at the Rene Marquez hall at Centro de Bellas Artes, also in Santurce.

Montalban did many plays during this era of her life, participating in more than ten plays. Among the most remembered ones are two Disney-character ones, "Blanca Nieves" ("Snow White") and ""Cinderella". By 1971, she had also embarked in a side career as a show host and producer, on Canal 4's "Buenos Dias y Algo Mas" ("Good Morning and Something Else").

She kept a busy acting career, nevertheless, and, in 1983, at Centro de Bellas Artes, she presented a monologue show named "Dos Personajes y Una Actriz" ("Two Characters, one Actress"), in which she showed "La Voz Humana" ("The Human Voice") as well as Chekhov's "La Lectura" ("The Lecture"). For this, she was awarded the Circle of Theater Critics' award as actress of the year.

Montalban next played a breast cancer victim, "Estela Moreno", in a Vicky Hernandez WAPA-TV (canal 4) mini-series production named "Las Divorciadas" ("The Divorced Women"). Notably, during this era, Montalban had actually been diagnosed with that disease in real life.

Deeply affected by breast cancer, Montalban acted for the last time in another Vicky Hernandez production, Canal 7's "La Carcel de Todos" ("Everyone's Jail"), a mini-series which was shown during April 1989, and in which she shared acting credits with, among others, Sully Diaz, Idalia Perez Garay and Junior Alvarez.

== Personal life and death ==
Montalban married German-Puerto Rican actor Axel Anderson in 1960; the pair had met decades before in Argentina and had also lived in Colombia and the Dominican Republic. In 1970, the couple divorced, but they remained lifelong friends and professional collaborators.

On Saturday, December 13, 1980, she married banker Fernando Castroman, who was a Banco Popular de Puerto Rico vice-president. They remained married for the rest of her life. Castroman was murdered during a 1994 robbery as he was visiting Montalban's burial place at a cemetery in Caguas.

Helena Montalban was diagnosed with breast cancer in 1971; she battled the disease, having both breasts removed by surgery, until finally dying of it, at 1:20 AM, on Saturday, 2 March, 1991 at Auxilio Mutuo Hospital in Hato Rey, San Juan, Puerto Rico.

== See also ==
- List of Argentines
- List of Puerto Ricans
