= Corporación Estatal de Radio y Televisión =

Dominican radio and television network

- Type: State-Owned
- Industry: Media
- Founded: 1952
- Headquarters: Santo Domingo, Dominican Republic
- Products: Radio and Television; Multimedia
- Website: certv.gob.do (in Spanish)

RTVD 4
- Country: Dominican Republic
- Broadcast area: Dominican Republic

Programming
- Picture format: 1080i HDTV (downscaled to 16:9 480i for the SDTV feed)

Ownership
- Owner: Corporación Estatal de Radio y Television (CERTV)

History
- Launched: August 1, 1952
- Founder: José Arismendy Trujillo

Availability

Terrestrial
- Analog VHF: Channel 4
- Digital VHF: Channel 4.1

Streaming media
- Canal4rd.com: Watch Live

Corporación Estatal de Radio y Televisión (CERTV, State Radio and Television Corporation) is a radio and television network operating from Santo Domingo in the Dominican Republic. It is a public television channel operated and owned by the Dominican government. Following the frequency unification of 1996, CERTV has been aired throughout the country on channel 4 (canal 4). Previously, channel 4 was broadcast in Santo Domingo and the Southern zone, channel 5 in the Northern region and channel 12 in the Southwest.

== History ==
The channel was first aired on August 1, 1952 with the name La Voz Dominicana. This was the first television transmitter of its kind in the country and the fifth in Latin America, after Mexico, Brazil, Cuba, and Argentina. The original owner was José Arismendy Trujillo (Petán), brother of the notorious dictator Rafael Trujillo (d. 1961). It was a combination of radio and television that transmitted live programming for six hours. Romance Campesino was one of the first television and radio series that aired from the station. Besides providing entertainment and information, this media outlet was also used by the government to communicate favorable propaganda for the Trujillo regime.

The station carried the HIT callsign in Santo Domingo on channel 4. On August 1, 1958, the station opened two further relay stations, channel 9 in La Cumbre and channel 2 in Santo Cerro.

Argentine-Puerto Rican Helena Montalban and her future husband, German-Puerto Rican Axel Anderson, were among the channel's first stars.

During the 1970s, the channel was officially renamed Radio Televisión Dominicana (RTVD), a title which persisted for several decades. On July 29, 2003 its name was changed once again to Corporación Estatal de Radio y Televisión (CERTV) by means of a national decree which transformed it into a public company sustained and operated by the Dominican Government.

== CERTV: Definition and Functions ==
According to Article 4 of the law which created it (134-03), CERTV has a general objective of managing and running public telecommunication for the transport and diffusion of television signals in VHF (Very high frequency) and UHF (Ultra high frequency) and television systems for coaxial cable, equivalent to public broadcasting networks for medium and short wave and frequency modulated for the transmission and broadcasting of radio and TV programming, as well as the transmission and broadcasting of these programs by other media types that exists or could exist in the future.

== List of Programs seen in this channel ==
- Centro Noticias
- Centro Deportes
- Caribe Show
- El Tapón de las 12
- TV Revista
- El Kan del 4
- Domingos en Grande
- El Reto Semana - Primera Etapa
- El Club de Isha - Primera Etapa
- El Show del Mediodía - Primera Etapa
- El Gordo de la Semana - Primera Etapa
- Buen Provecho
- Santo Domingo Invita
- En Acción con Manuel y Hermes
- El humor nunca pasa
