= Paloma Suau =

Puerto Rican actress

Paloma Suau (born c. 1972) is a Puerto Rican film and video director, writer, editor and actress. Suau's father, Gabriel Suau, is a Spaniard who immigrated to Puerto Rico, where he became a well known television figure. Her mother is Camille Carrion, a well known Puerto Rican actress. Suau's second cousin is Richard Carrión, president of Banco Popular de Puerto Rico.

== Biography ==
Born in San Juan, Puerto Rico, Paloma Suau acquired her bachelor's degree for Film at New York University Tisch School of the Arts in 1994. In 1996, Paloma started her own production company, Ninguna Ciencia (No Rocket Science). Since then, she has been producing, writing, directing and editing documentaries, short films, music videos, television specials, commercials and live concerts.

Between 2000 and 2006, Paloma directed a yearly music documentary focusing on Latin American music and traditions. El Especial del Banco Popular, fulfilled one of Paloma’s ambitions: to deliver films that strengthen identity and celebrate diversity. In 2004, Paloma co-directed and edited “DreamMakers”, a documentary about people who overcome constricting realities through clear vision and values. In 2008 she co-wrote and directed television comedy series: Elena Santos. In 2009 Paloma wrote, directed and produced her short film “Palomitas”. In 2010-2011, Paloma co-directed (with Jonathan Stack) and did the principal photography of “The Five Awakenings”, a documentary on David Simon M.D., co-founder of the Chopra Center, re known neurologist and Ayurvedic authority. She accompanied David as he confronted his own mortality when diagnosed with a glioblastoma multiform. During this process she became a Chopra Center certified meditation, yoga and ayurveda instructor.

Paloma spent almost 9 years (2003-2012) filming an intimate documentary on super star Miguel Bosé. The film presents the Spanish legend as he reinvents himself creating life from chaos. "Family Life" is yet to be presented in public.

Apart from developing her first narrative feature film, a musical :“Maestra Vida”, based on Ruben Blades’s salsa opera by the same name, Paloma is currently editing her new project: "El Accidente Feliz'" Antonio Martorell y sus amigos, un baile que no termina. This non fiction narrative explores Martorell's life and creative process from Paloma's personal perspective. With the intention of re connecting with her own creative flow, she follows Toño in search of light. Through the process of making the film she reinvents herself. "El Accidente Feliz" will the released in 2016.

Paloma Suau's parents divorced when she was still a young girl. Her mother later met Glenn Monroig, a famous Puerto Rican singer who would become like a father to Paloma Suau.

Suau grew up in the entertainment business, befriending people like Tony Croatto and other industry veterans before she had become a teenager. Although Glenn Monroig and Camille Carrion's long romantic relationship led Monroig and Suau to have a father and daughter-like relationship, she was never afar from her father Gabriel, who kept an interest on his daughter's life as she was becoming an adult.

Paloma Suau expressed interest in becoming an actress and director since she was a small girl; her dreams of being a director, however, were more evident than her dreams of being an actress, as she always mentioned wanting to direct when interviewed in Puerto Rican show business magazines and television shows.

Her debut as a director came on a Christmas video produced by Banco Popular, 2000's "Guitarra Mia" ("My Guitar"), where she also debuted as a screenwriter and editor. The decision to make her director of this video proved controversial: Banco Popular had been producing a series of Christmas music videos for the Puerto Rico music market since 1998, and "Guitarra Mia" was Suau's first behind the camera directing opportunity. Since her second cousin is president of Banco Popular, many among the Puerto Rican public suspected she was chosen over other directors due to favoritism. Alas, her creative talents have given the Banco Popular programs a depth and quality that has made them possibly more documentaries than the "variety shows" they used to be.

Suau followed that production with 2001's "Raíces" ("Roots"). In 2002, she was in charge of the filming of "Encuentro" ("Meeting"). In 2003, Suau filmed "Ocho Puertas" ("Eight Doors"), which was followed by 2004's "En mi Pais" ("In my Country").

"En mi Pais" became one of Suau's largest works, as she traveled to Puerto Rico's southern area for about two months in order to produce a video where the influence of Plena music in Puerto Rico was shown. In addition, she hired Mexican singer Alejandro Fernández to participate in the video. Suau had a spectacular debut as an actress in "En mi Pais", playing a dancer.

Suau decided to pay homage to the Three Wise Men, traditional Christmas figures among Latin Americans, on the 2005 version of Banco Popular's Christmas special. Not very long after she had participated in the funeral of long-time friend Tony Croatto, Suau set on filming "Queridos Reyes Magos" ("Dear Wise Men"), which was released on Puerto Rican television on December of that year, before going on sale as a video, CD and DVD, like the eight previous versions of the musical special.

Suau traveled across Puerto Rico to record "Queridos Reyes Magos", filming in places as far as Guaynabo, to the island's north, and Guayama, to the island's south. Colombian singing superstar Juanes was among the stars Suau hired for the 2005 version of Banco Popular's Christmas musical.

Apart from Alejandro Fernández and Juanes, Paloma Suau has directed many Puerto Rican singers, such as José Feliciano, Manny Manuel and Andy Montañez. Tony Croatto, who lived many years in Puerto Rico but was actually Italian, also sang on a number of Suau's productions before his passing.

Paloma Suau has revealed plans to film a movie about a Dominican Republic immigrant to Puerto Rico during 2006.

During 2020, Suau released a documentary named "El Accidente Feliz" ("The Happy Accident") about Puerto Rican artist Antonio Martorell.

== See also ==
- List of Puerto Ricans
- List of Spaniards
