= Camilo Delgado =

Puerto Rican television show host (1927–2005)

- Born: May 29, 1927; Carolina, Puerto Rico
- Died: February 8, 2005 (aged 78); Hato Rey, Puerto Rico
- Occupations: Actor, Radio Announcer, TV host and TV Producer

Camilo Delgado (May 29, 1927 – February 8, 2005) was a Puerto Rican television show host and producer.

== Career ==
Delgado's interest in the dramatic arts sprouted at a young age and he acted in high school productions of Spanish plays such as Puebla de Mujeres and Prohibido Suicidarse en Primavera. While attending college in Puerto Rico, he founded the drama club at the "Instituto Politecnico" (Interamerican University) which eventually led to the creation of the university's drama department.

He pioneered television in Puerto Rico and appeared regularly as an actor, announcer, MC, talk show host, and producer. The son of a school principal and an elementary school teacher, he graduated from the American Academy of Dramatic Arts in New York City with honors in 1957. After acting in numerous off-Broadway productions such as The Heiress, Shakhuntala, and The Summer House, he returned to Puerto Rico and became a leading man in soap operas such as Concierto de Amor and Bajo el Vuelo de los Alcatraces. In 1970, he became an independent producer and created hits such as Sabado Gigantes, (produced along with Mario Pabon and not to be confused with Sabado Gigante), Field Day por Television, Gane con Subaru, Volando con Pan Am and pioneered morning television in his country with Despierta Puerto Rico.

Delgado produced TV shows with a high quality standard, avoiding vulgarity or sensationalism. Nonetheless, he publicly opposed any kind of censorship on the content of television programs.

== Personal life ==
Camilo Delgado was born on May 29, 1927, in Carolina. He was married to Diana Santiago for 55 years. On February 8, 2005, he died peacefully in his sleep at the age of 78 of natural causes. He was buried at Cementerio Borinquen Memorial Park in Caguas, Puerto Rico.

== Filmography ==
- 1962: Strangers in the City as Jose Alvarez
- 1966: Fantasía... 3
- 1969: El escuadrón del pánico
