= La Voz Dominicana =

La Voz Dominicana was the official radio and television station of the Dominican Republic during the regime of Rafael Leónidas Trujillo. The station was a radio broadcast only called La Voz del Yuna (1943) in Bonao until Jose Arismendy Trujillo Molina (Petan), brother of President Trujillo, acquired the station and moved it to the capital city. As the station become the official radio station, its name was changed to La Voz de los Dominicana (The Dominican Voice) on August 1, 1952. Petan Trujillo loved the station so much that some said that he slept in the station building. He later convinced his brother to get the equipment to turn the station into a radio/TV station. President Trujillo was moved by the idea as he found out that in Latin America only three countries (Brazil, Cuba and Mexico) had TV stations, and in the early 1950s, what is called Radio Television Dominicana (RTVD) was founded. Dominican Republic became the 5th country in Latin America to launch a TV station.

Its current name is Corporación Estatal de Radio y Televisión (CERTV) and operates only on channel 4.

== Chronology ==
- 1943: La Voz del Yuna is founded in Bonao.
- 1946: The station moved to Santo Domingo.
- 1952: TV station (third in Latin America) is added to La Voz del Yuna and its name is changed to La Voz Dominicana.
- 1961: After Trujillo's death, its name was changed to Radio Santo Domingo Television.
- 1965: It changed its name to Radio Television Dominicana and started to broadcast on channels 4, 5, and 12.
- 2003: Changed its name to Corporación Estatal de Radio y Televisión (CERTV), and operates only on channel 4 and 17.
