= Margot Debén =

Nicaraguan-Puerto Rican actress, singer, musician, show host and magician (1922-2010

- Born: December 12, 1912; Managua, Nicaragua
- Died: October 10, 2010 (age 87); Bayamon, Puerto Rico
- Occupations: Television actress, singer, magician, puppeteer
- Children: Angela Meyer

Margot Debén (December 12, 1922 – October 10, 2010) was a Nicaraguan-Puerto Rican actress, singer and pianist. She was also a show host and a magician. She is perhaps better known for playing "Agripina" in the major Puerto Rican television sitcom hit, "La Criada Malcriada" and for her participation, alongside daughter Angela Meyer, in the 1980s talk show, "Ellas al Mediodia".

== Early life ==
Debén was born in Managua, Nicaragua, the daughter of the well-known Ricardo Richardine, Sr., a Spaniard magician of that era. Debén only stayed in Nicaragua for eleven days; on December 23, 1922, her family left that country as they returned to Puerto Rico.

In her early years, Debén lead a nomadic life, as she began traveling extensively when she went to Peru at age nine, taking piano lessons there and debuting as a professional singer. She then spent time touring South America, singing and dancing as part of a show that she starred on. Later on, as part of a show in which her father was the star, Debén toured Europe under the nickname of "La Princesa de Nanglín, La Diosá María de la Magia Negra" ("The Nanglin Princess, Goddess Maria of Black Magic")

== Acting career ==
Debén finally settled permanently in Puerto Rico when she was able to find stable work as an actress at San Juan's Teatro Tapia, where she found steady work as a theater actress, which in turn also led to her touring the island to act at plays in different Puerto Rican cities. It was then that the well-known actor Luis Antonio Rivera, also known as "Yoyo Boing", recommended her for the character of "Agripina" in the show named "La Criada Malcriada".

In 1970, Debén joined Rivera and Rosita Velazquez, among others, in another Puerto Rican television sitcom, this time named "Mi Hippie Me Encanta" ("I Love My Hippie"), which was another major hit in the island-country. Debén then moved to Canal 7, where for a time, she became a puppeteer on Rosaura Andreu's television show, "Titi Chagua". Debén was in charge of the puppet known as "Doňa Fantasia" ("Missis Fantasy") in that show.

== Later years ==
In the mid-1980s, Debén joined her daughter, Ángela Meyer and several other actresses such as Magali Carrasquillo, Camille Carrion, Elia Enid Cadilla, Carmen Belen Richardson and others, in a Canal 11 talk show named "Ellas al Mediodia" ("Women at Midday") which was a major television hit in Puerto Rico. The show was eventually cancelled by Canal 11, but it was picked up by Canal 2 and renamed "Ellas...Para Ti" ("Women For You"), where, along with Meyer and Richardson also, Debén was rejoined with Rosaura Andreu. When at Canal 2, the show continued being an audiences favorite in Puerto Rico.

Debén then decided to retire from the public eye.

== Death ==
Debén died of a heart attack on October 10, 2010, at the Juan de Dios home for the elderly in Bayamon, Puerto Rico.

== Personal life ==
Debén had one known daughter, Puerto Rican actress and show host Ángela Meyer.

== See also ==
- List of Nicaraguans
- List of Puerto Ricans
