= Auxilio Mutuo Hospital =

Hospital in San Juan, Puerto Rico

Coordinates: 18.40868°N 66.05139°W

Auxilio Mutuo Hospital, legally the Hospital Español Auxilio Mutuo de Puerto Rico Inc., which is owned by Sociedad Española de Auxilio Mutuo y Beneficencia (Auxilio Mutuo Spanish Hospital of Puerto Rico, Inc., and Spanish Society of Mutual Help) is a tertiary level hospital in San Juan, Puerto Rico.

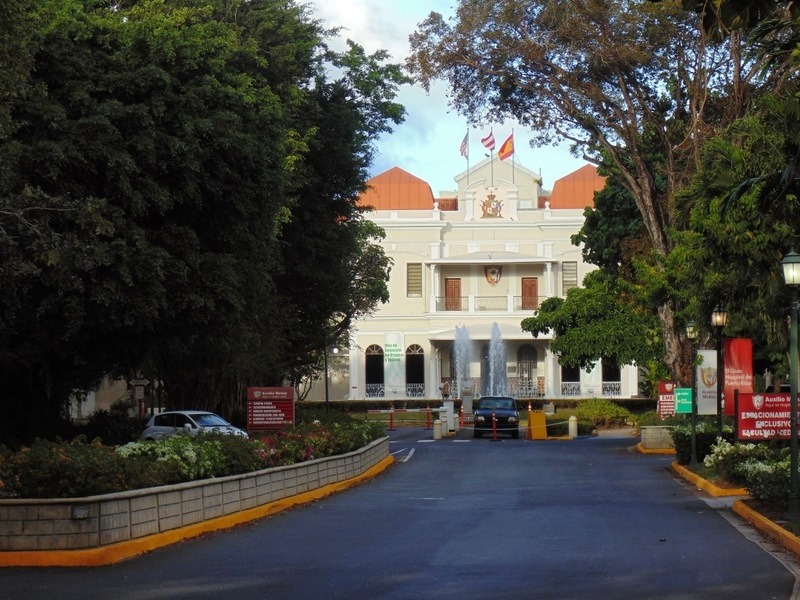
Auxilio Mutuo hospital entrance

The hospital is located in the San Juan area of Rio Piedras.

== History ==
The hospital was established in 1882. Back then, Puerto Rico was still a province of Spain, and San Juan was, and still is, the largest urban center of the Island.

At the time, there was no such thing as health insurance as is known today. Seeing this, the hospital's founders, Candido Carrero, Gorgonio Bolivar, Ricardo Alonso, Higinio Troncoso, Pedro Comas, Antonio Acha and A. David Gonzalez, came up with the idea of establishing the Island's first mutual assistance organization, the Sociedad Española de Auxilio Mutuo y Beneficencia, with an initial composition of 187 members who financed the construction of the hospital.

The hospital was inaugurated in September 1883 at Fortaleza street in San Juan. It is now located in a large medical campus adjacent to the Rio Piedras Campus of the University of Puerto Rico.

In July 2024, the hospital announced it had discovered a breach to their internet network which took place during 2023. There is no evidence that personal patient information, including medical and diagnosis records, was removed.

== Deaths ==
- Cardinal Luis Aponte Martinez, (1922–2012)
- Walter Mercado, (1932–2019)
- Helena Montalban (1926–1991)
- Dr. Johnny Rullán, former Puerto Rico Secretary of Health (1955–2019)
