= Jesse Calderón =

Puerto Rican television personality

Jesse Calderón (born in 1970 in Río Piedras, Puerto Rico) is a well known show host from Puerto Rico. He was once the host of El Show del Mediodia, a daily midday show televised by Televicentro Puerto Rico.

== Biography ==
Much about Calderon's earlier life is not known. He was a radio show host for a number of years before being signed by Televicentro Puerto Rico, but he was not a celebrity until he arrived on Puerto Rican television. He also hosted small shows in different venues, such as schools, shopping malls and fiestas patronales.

He graduated with a bachelor's degree in telecommunications at Universidad del Sagrado Corazón while working in WIAC-FM and Sistema 102-FM.

As show host of El Show del Mediodia, Calderon has shared with Luis Francisco Ojeda, Milly Cangiano, comedian and former telenovela supporting actor: Junior Alvarez, a Christian actress, Maribel Quiñones known as Sor Tata, and chef Cielito Rosado, among others.

Apart from working at El Show del Mediodia, he, Rosado and Eddie Miró once shared hosting responsibilities at a nightly show in one of San Juan's popular hotels.

== See also ==
- List of Puerto Ricans
