= Fascination (2004 film) =

- Directed by: Klaus Menzel
- Screenplay by: Daryl Haney, John L. Jacobs, Klaus Menzel
- Release date: 2004

Fascination is a 2004 film directed by Klaus Menzel. The screenplay was written by Daryl Haney, John L. Jacobs, and Klaus Menzel.

== Plot ==
The wealthy Doherty family of three live on a remote Florida island, still untouched by developers. Soon after his father's presumed accidental drowning, Scott Doherty is surprised and resentful when his mother plans to wed Oliver Vance. Scott soon meets Kelly, Oliver's daughter, and a heated romance begins. Growing more suspicious about his father's death, Scott and Kelly investigate and discover shocking evidence pointing to murder. Lies and cover-ups begin to surface, unraveling Scott and Kelly's relationship. The final blow comes when a duel fatality explosion occurs at Scott's island house he had been renovating. All the evidence points to him as the murderer. Has he been framed, having no hope of exoneration, or will the truth be revealed?

== Cast ==
- James Naughton as Patrick Doherty
- Jacqueline Bisset as Maureen Doherty
- Adam Garcia as Scott Doherty
- Stuart Wilson as Oliver Vance
- Alice Evans as Kelly Vance
- Craig Cady as Phillip Shields
- Vincent Castellanos as District Attorney
- Jaime Bello as Martin Earnhardt
- Sterling Fitzgerald as Sammi Russell
- Ted Richard as First Detective
- Gary Davies as Second Detective
- Cucho Viera as Pharmacist
- Bill Sloan as E.R. Doctor
- Elia Enid Cadilla as Justice of the Peace
- Idee B. Charriez Millet as Nurse
- J.C. Love as Dr. Reis
