= Los Donatti =

- Genre: Telenovela
- Written by: José Simón Escalona
- Starring: Alba Roversi; Tony Rodríguez; Ivonne Goderich; Eva Blanco
- Opening theme: "Amarte por ultima vez" by Jose Alberto Mugrabi
- Country of origin: Venezuela
- Original language: Spanish
- No. of episodes: 95

Original release
- Network: Venevisión
- Release: 1986

Los Donatti is a 1986 Venezuelan telenovela produced by Venevisión and distributed internationally by Venevisión International. The telenovela was written by José Simón Escalona and starred Alba Roversi and Tony Rodríguez.

== Plot ==
Los Donatti revolves around an Italian mob family and the heirs of the family, two sons who stand to inherit a construction company. Remigio Donatti is an Italian immigrant to Venezuela where he settles, marries a Venezuelan and has 2 children with her while establishing a lucrative construction company. But before marriage, Doña Bendita had a daughter she was forced to give up. Years later, the sons of Don Remigio will fight to gain control of the company. Before his death, Remigio will tell Bendita he knew of her long lost daughter called Marisol who wants nothing to do with her real birth mother. Marisol will fall in love with Arturo Paolo, and their love will be embroiled in jealousy and ambition.

== Cast ==
- Alba Roversi
- Tony Rodríguez
- Ivonne Goderich
- Julio Alcázar
- Gustavo Rodríguez
- Eva Blanco
- Yanis Chimaras
- Raúl Xiques
- Junior Alvarez
