= Madeline Willemsen =

Puerto Rican actress

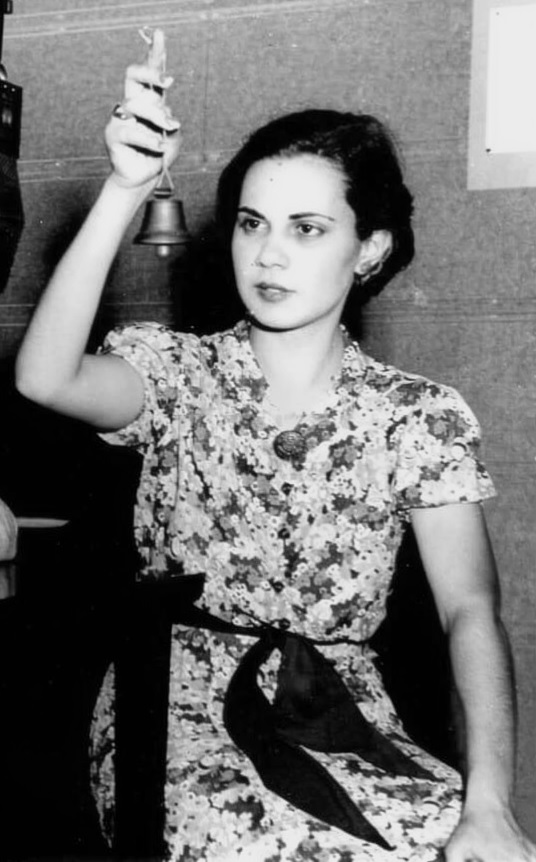
- Born: September 28, 1915; Mayagüez, Puerto Rico
- Died: May 9, 1982 (age 66); San Juan, Puerto Rico
- Occupations: actress and comedian

Madeline Willemsen (September 28, 1915 - May 9, 1982) was an actress and comedian, born in Mayagüez, Puerto Rico to a Dutch father and a Puerto Rican mother. She was the first cousin of Lucy Boscana, considered by some Puerto Rican theater critics to be the finest Puerto Rican actress of all time.

Her full name was Madeline Willemsen Bravo, and her maternal family was of Jewish origin. She lived in Mexico and studied acting in the United States, and worked for some time as a teacher in her hometown, when she returned to Puerto Rico. She used to cause scandals with her neighbours, smoking publicly, when it was not well seen for women. She started working in radio soap operas during the 1950s, especially in the Puerto Rican public radio station. When commercial television started operating on the island, her well-bred looks assured her a position as a leading lady. She was also a competent scriptwriter.

She was in "Rappaccini's Daughter" on PBS's American Short Stories in 1980.

Madeline Willemsen is buried at Santa María Magdalena de Pazzis Cemetery in Old San Juan.

== See also ==
- List of Puerto Ricans
