= Rafael Carrión Sr. =

Puerto Rican businessman (1891–1964)

- Founder of Banco Popular de Puerto Rico
- Born: January 3, 1891; San Juan, Puerto Rico
- Died: March 26, 1964 (aged 73); San Juan, Puerto Rico
- Occupations: President and CEO, Popular, Inc. (1927–1956)
- Spouse: Ernestina Ruiz
- Children: 8
- Relatives: Richard Carrión (grandson)

Notes
- Banco Popular de Puerto Rico is the largest Hispanic bank in the United States

Rafael Carrión Sr. (January 3, 1891 – March 26, 1964), the patriarch of one of Puerto Rico's financial dynasties, was one of the founding fathers of Banco Popular de Puerto Rico, the largest bank in Puerto Rico and the largest Hispanic bank in the United States.

== Early years ==
Carrión (birth name: Rafael Carrión Pacheco) came from a humble family, His father was José Dolores Carrión from the city of Manati and his mother was Francisca Pacheco from the town of Naguabo. His family lived in Santurce where Carrión, who was one of five siblings, was born. The family sustained themselves economically by selling water in containers. In 1896, Carrión's mother died of typhoid fever and the family moved to the City of Caguas.

In 1899, his father died and Carrión went to live with his older half-brother José B. Carrión Santiago in the City of Arecibo. His brother was a businessman who kept the accounting records of many of the local businesses. Carrión was then able to attend the Americanized public school system which taught in English and where he would learn the language. In 1902, Carrión moved to San Juan and lived with his sister. He quit school in the eighth grade and worked for various firms until he finally found a job at Lomba & Cia, an importer of goods from the United States and Europe. When the owners of the firm became aware of Carrión's English-language proficiency, they put him charge of transactions made in that language.

Carrión quit his job and went to New York City where he found a job with E.G. Perez & Cia. In 1909, his former employer from Lomba & Cia wrote to him and recommended that he study finances because they were planning in opening a branch in that city. After a short stay in New York, Carrión returned to Puerto Rico and went to work for his brother once more, this time as a salesperson. His brother's business, located in San Juan, represented the Baldwin Locomotive Company and was successful. Unfortunately his brother fell ill, died within one year, and Carrión took charge of the business. The Baldwin Company helped Carrión by enrolling him in commercial courses, and by making him their representative in the Dominican Republic and Venezuela.

In 1911, he married Ernestina Ruiz with whom he fathered eight children.

Over the years Carrión invested in sugar, real estate and other industries. As a result, he had dealings with the American Colonial Bank in Puerto Rico, who invited Carrión to purchase some of its stock. Carrión became interested in banking and soon thought about purchasing a local bank.

== Beginning of the Carrión dynasty ==
Banco Popular de Puerto Rico can trace its roots to 1893, when Puerto Rico was still a Spanish colony. That year, fifty-two stockholders provided the initial capital to establish the Sociedad Anónima de Economías y Préstamos ( The Anonymous Savings & Loan Society), a savings bank for the poor. However the United States invaded Puerto Rico during the Spanish–American War in 1898, and the island was annexed by the U.S. under the terms of the Treaty of Paris of 1898 which was ratified on December 10, 1898. Almost immediately, the United States began the "Americanization" process of Puerto Rico. The U.S. occupation brought about a total change in Puerto Rico's economic and political life. Amongst the many industries appropriated and controlled by the U.S. Government, were Puerto Rico's financial and banking institutions.

In 1913, the United States Congress passed the Federal Reserve Act which created The Federal Reserve System. All national banks were required to join the system and Congress created Federal Reserve notes to provide the nation with an elastic supply of currency. The notes were to be issued to Federal Reserve Banks for subsequent transmittal to banking institutions in accordance with the needs of the public.

As a consequence of the new rules and regulations, the Sociedad Anonima de Economias y Prestamos ceased operations. In 1923 Carrión and his older brother, together with some of the former members of the Sociedad Anonima, organized and founded the Banco Popular de Puerto Rico, a commercial bank (rather than a savings bank, in which Carrión served as Executive Vice President.

Four years later in 1927, Carrión became the majority stockholder of the bank, its president, and CEO.

== Banco Popular de Puerto Rico ==
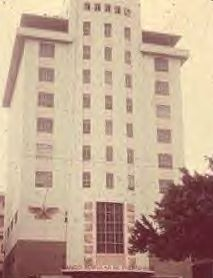
Art Deco "BPPR" Headquarters Building

Carrión presided and led the bank until 1956. Under his leadership the bank established its first physical branch in 1934. In its first year, the bank provided personal loans without requiring collateral. This made the bank enormously popular (in accordance with its name) and, by 1954, the bank had 20 branches in different parts of the island. This represented a growth rate of one new Banco Popular branch for every year of its existence, between 1934 and 1954. Given the challenges of the Great Depression, World War II, and the Korean War, this success and growth rate was astounding.

During the Great Depression, the bank survived while others failed. In 1930, Banco Popular purchased the oldest and most respected banking institution on the island, the Banco Comercial de Puerto Rico. With a total of $8.82 million in deposits in 1937, Banco Popular became the largest bank in Puerto Rico. In 1938, it became the first bank in Puerto Rico to offer FHA mortgage loans. In 1939, Carrión completed the construction of an Art Deco headquarters for the bank, on Tetuán Street in Old San Juan.

Carrión was a stock holder in the Continental Bank of New York and when that institution merged with Chemical Bank & Trust Co. in 1948, he became a member of Chemical's Board of Directors. He retired in 1956 and the leadership positions were occupied by his sons Rafael Jr. and Joe Carrión. In 1990, his grandson (son of Rafael Jr.) Richard Carrión was named Chairman of the Board and Chief Executive Officer of the Company, the Bank, Popular North America, Inc. and Subsidiaries.

== Legacy ==
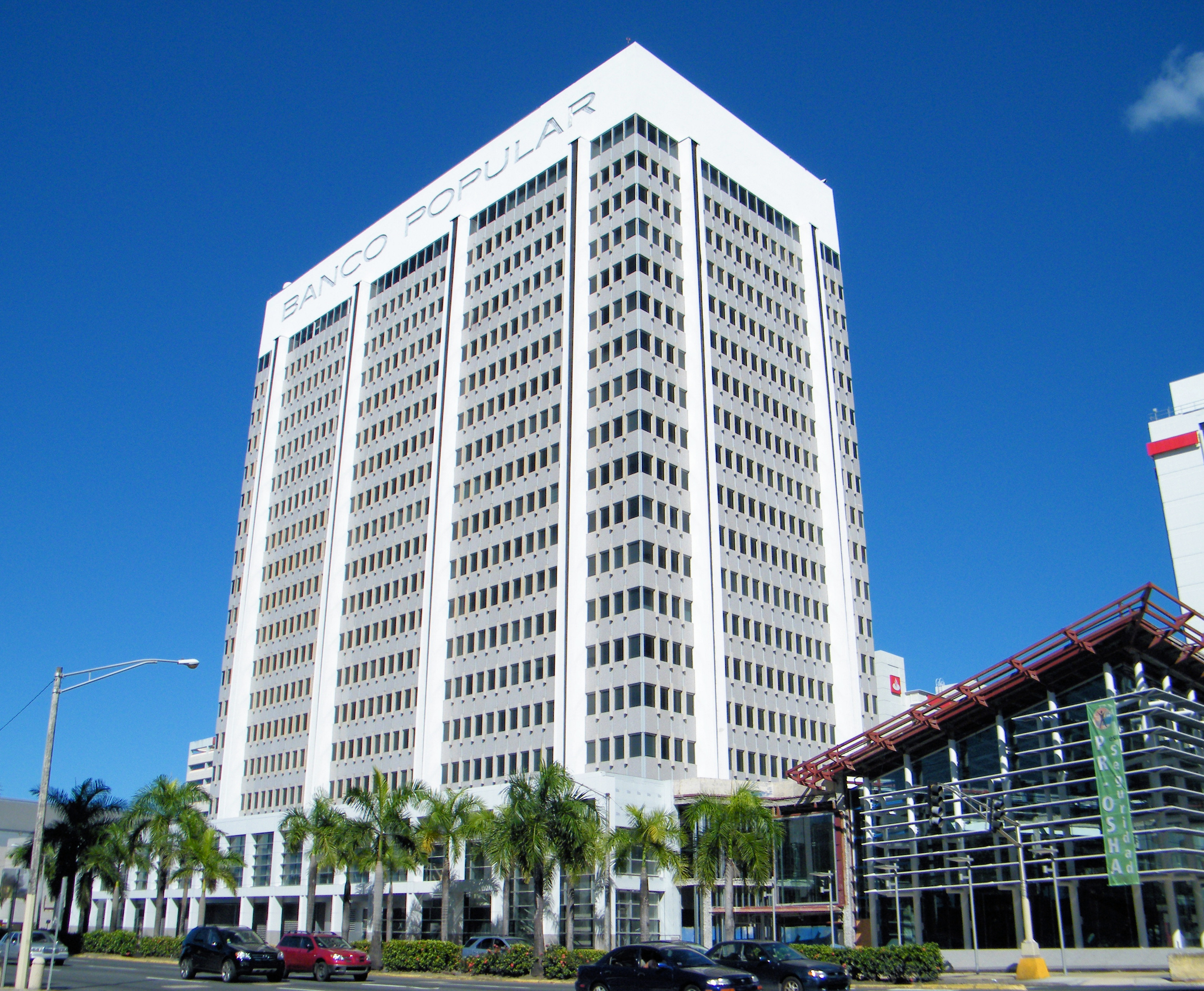
Popular, Inc. headquarters

During his lifetime, Carrión was able to witness the growth of the bank which he co-founded from a small local bank with one branch in 1934, to the largest bank in Puerto Rico with two additional branches in New York City - one in the Bronx and another in Manhattan.

Rafael Carrión Pacheco, died on March 26, 1964, in San Juan, Puerto Rico. He was buried at the Puerto Rico Memorial in Carolina, Puerto Rico Since his death, Banco Popular de Puerto Rico has grown into a multinational banking and financial institution with 302 bank branches and 382 non-bank offices. It is the 35th largest bank holding company in the United States, and the largest Hispanic-owned bank in the United States. Of the company's 302 banking branches, 199 are in Puerto Rico, 95 in the continental United States, and 8 in the Virgin Islands. Of the 382 non-banking offices, Equity One has 136; Popular Cash Express, 132; Popular Finance, 61; Popular Mortgage, 21; Popular Leasing & Rental, 12; and Popular Leasing, U.S.A., 11.

In honor of Carrión, the plaza surrounding the restored 1936 Banco Popular building in Old San Juan was named the Plazoleta Rafael Carrión Pacheco. On the third floor of the building, the "Rafael Carrión Pacheco Exhibition Hall" is maintained, with myriad exhibits.

== See also ==
- List of Puerto Ricans
- Banco Popular de Puerto Rico
