= Glenn Monroig =

Puerto Rican musician (born 1957)

- Born: April 22, 1957 (age 69); San Juan, Puerto Rico
- Genres: Salsa and Boleros
- Occupation: Musician
- Instrument: Vocals Guitar
- Years active: 1980–present

Glenn Monroig (born April 22, 1957) is a Puerto Rican composer, guitarist, and singer of various types of music styles, such as salsa, boleros and rumba. He is credited with having recorded the first rap song in Spanish.

== Biography ==
=== Early years ===
Monroig was born in San Juan, Puerto Rico where he received his primary and secondary education. Monroig, his brother Gilberto Jr. and sister Linda were in constant contact with the world of music and were influenced at an early age by their famous father, the renowned singer of boleros, Gilberto Monroig. His professional debut as a singer was at age 14 when he sang at his father's night club La Guitarra de Gilberto and later went on to perform at places like Ocho Puertas La Tea and other cafe theaters in old San Juan.

=== First recording ===
In 1980, Monroig recorded and had his first "hit" with "Jamas te voy abandonar asi otra vez" (I'm never gonna leave you this way again). He represented Puerto Rico in the OTI Festival 1981 with the song "Mirame a los Ojos". That year he also started his own record label "Mamoku" and later also founded his own recording company called "Sitting Duck".

=== The first Spanish language rap song ===
External audio
- You may listen to Glenn Monroig's "Por Siempre" on YouTube.

In 1983, Monroig recorded "No Finjas", the first Spanish language rap song. In 1984, he recorded and sang the song "Me Dijeron" (I was told), which treated the sensitive subject of homosexuality in a respectful way. In 1986, Monroig had one of his greatest "hits' with "Por Siempre" (Forever). He started composing by converting English songs into Spanish, such as "Forever" which was originally written by Kenny Loggins.

Among the singers who have worked with Glenn are:

- Emmanuel,
- Luis Enrique,
- Cheo Feliciano,
- Lucecita Benítez,
- Nydia Caro,
- Yolandita Monge,
- Lunna,
- Kenny Loggins (when he visited Puerto Rico),
- Jon Anderson (on Deseo album by Jon Anderson)
- His father Gilberto.

With Lunna, Monroig recorded "A Todo Dar" (Everything Goes), the "first" digitally produced album in Puerto Rico. Monroig also wrote the anti-drug theme song for the Government of Puerto Rico's campaign against drugs. The theme has been recorded by Ednita Nazario, Danny Rivera, Sophy Hernandez and the group Menudo. Some of the other different styles of music that he has recorded are boleros such as "Intimo", rumbas such as "Rumbo a rumba" and blues with "Nevando en Puerto Rico".

In the 1990s, Monroig established the "Mezza Lunna Recording Studios" in San Juan, where he continued to work with national and internationally known artists. He also produced and directed musical videos for various artists.

=== 2003-present ===
In September 2003, Monroig presented his "Esos son otros 20 pesos" (That will be another 20 dollars/That's another story) concert at the Antonio Paoli Hall of the Luis A. Ferre Center for the Performing Arts (Centro de Bellas Artes) in San Juan. Monroig is currently involved in all of the aspects of music.

After several years of inactivity Monroig released A papi in 2007. The production was intended as an homage, and is composed of twenty-seven songs originally sung by Gilberto Monroig, released in a two disk set. The album includes Monroig's commentary on several matters including his relationship with his father and parts of his life. The music was composed by Franky Suárez and was performed by more than fifty musicians. The production was well received by the Puerto Rican media, with mainstream newspaper Primera Hora calling Monroig's performance a "prodigious interpretation, which defies the atmosphere and displays his strength and vocal versatility", while at the same time illustrating a "man of marvelous sapience and an exquisite taste for romantic and candent melody." The musical soundtrack received a similar reception, being regarded as "excellent interpretations". After twelve years without publishing an entirely original proposal, Monroig announced the release of a new production in October 2008. Among the themes included there is a song name "Claro" which criticizes the political situation of Puerto Rico.

== Personal life ==
He had a long romance with Camille Carrion and became a second father to Carrion's daughter, Paloma Suau. Monroig was also married to graphic designer Sonia Rivera with whom he has a daughter - Salome Monroig - born in 2004, who herself is a singer and actor. Glenn Monroig has been an outspoken supporter of many causes, such as the anti Castro movements.

== See also ==
- List of Puerto Ricans
- French immigration to Puerto Rico
- Puerto Rican songwriters
