= Richard Carrión =

Puerto Rican businessman

- Born: November 26, 1952 (age 73); San Juan, Puerto Rico
- Education: University of Pennsylvania (BS); Massachusetts Institute of Technology (MS)
- Occupations: Executive Chairman, Popular, Inc.
- Spouse: Isabella Heseltine
- Children: 5
- Relatives: Rafael Carrión Sr. (grandfather)

Richard L. Carrión Rexach (born in November 26, 1952) is the executive chairman of Popular, Inc., the parent company of Banco Popular de Puerto Rico and Popular Bank. Prior to assuming his current position in July 2017, he served as chairman and chief executive officer of Popular, Inc. for over 20 years. He is on the board of directors at Verizon Communications and Centro Financiero BHD, and the supervisory board of NIBC Holding N.V. Carrión is currently a partner at J.C. Flowers & Co. He served as a director of the Federal Reserve Bank of New York from 2008 to 2015.

== Early life ==
Carrión was born and raised in San Juan, Puerto Rico. His grandfather, Rafael Carrión Sr., was one of the founders of Popular, Inc. (BPPR). He received a bachelor's degree from the Wharton School of Finance and Commerce in 1974 and an MS in Management Information Systems from the MIT Sloan School of Management in 1976. After the master's degree, Carrión joined Banco Popular in 1976. After his father's death, Carrión became the leader of the banking corporation.

== Popular, Inc. ==
While at the helm of Popular, Inc., Carrión implemented technological processes to banking in Puerto Rico, U.S. Virgin Islands and several countries in Latin America. Carrión's brought the first network of ATMs to Puerto Rico and other Latin American countries. He also led the successful migration from paper to electronic transactions and the establishment of the largest data processing center in the Caribbean, a regional leader in information technology.

== Philanthropy ==
For almost three decades, Carrión has divided his time between Popular and philanthropy, particularly emphasizing on education and sports. He is the founder and trustee of the Banco Popular Foundation; which, among other charities, has donated scholarships to over 1,000 students through the Rafael Carrión, Jr. Scholarship Fund. He currently serves on the board of directors of Verizon. Since 1992, Carrión has also been involved in the production of music videos that highlight Puerto Rico's musical culture and history. In 2007, he was appointed a member of the International Basketball Federation (FIBA) Finance Commission.

Carrión has also contributed to improving Puerto Rico's public education system. He participated in Sapientis Week, an initiative sponsored by the non-profit Sapientis which brings public figures into classrooms in order to raise the public's awareness of the education crisis in Puerto Rico.

== International Olympic Committee ==
He has been a member of the International Olympic Committee (IOC) since 1990 and currently chairs the Finance Commission and is a member of the IOC's Marketing, TV and Internet Rights Commissions. Carrión led the negotiation team for the U.S. broadcast of the 2010 and 2012 Olympic Games – generating $2 billion in revenue – and was elected to the IOC executive board in 2004. He was one of the torch carriers for the 2006 Winter Olympics in Turin, Italy.

From 1987, he and the Puerto Rico Olympic Committee attempted to bring the 2004 Summer Olympic Games to San Juan. That bid failed, however, when Athens was voted in 1997 as the city to host those games.

In 2012, Carrión awarded Javier Culson with the bronze medal for the 400 m hurdles and Jaime Espinal with the silver medal for wrestling freestyle 84 kg at the 2012 Olympics. Culson and Espinal were the first Puerto Ricans to win Olympic medals outside of boxing.

=== 2013 Candidacy for IOC President ===
On May 22, 2013, Carrión confirmed that he would run for president of the IOC. At the 125th IOC Session in Buenos Aires, Carrión secured 29 votes in the final round of voting, but lost the election to Thomas Bach.

== FIBA ==
Carrión is a current member of the FIBA Central Board, the highest executive body of FIBA.

== Personal life ==
Carrión is currently married to Isabella Heseltine. He was previously married to Conxita Viñamata Martorell, with whom he had a son, Rafael Luis. Carrión has 4 children from his first marriage to Ana Matienzo Carrion: Io Ana, Richard Jr., Ceciliana and Ana Sofía. Carrión is the cousin of Puerto Rican actress and radio talk show host Camille Carrión.

== See also ==
- Rafael Carrión Sr.
- List of Puerto Ricans
