= Diana Carolina =

- Genre: Telenovela
- Written by: Enrique Jarnes
- Directed by: Grazio d'Angelo
- Starring: Ivonne Groderich; Guillermo Dávila; Junior Álvarez; Millie Aviles
- Opening theme: Toda la luz by Guillermo Dávila
- Composer: Guillermo Dávila
- Country of origin: Venezuela
- Original language: Spanish

Production
- Executive producer: Marisara Martín
- Cinematography: Isidro Riera
- Editor: Guillermo Vega

Original release
- Network: Venevisión
- Release: August 13, 1984 – May 11, 1985

Related
- Las Amazonas

Diana Carolina is a 1984 Venezuelan telenovela produced by Venevisión in association with Wapa Televisión from Puerto Rico. Ivonne Goderich and Guillermo Dávila starred as the main characters. The theme song was Toda la luz by Guillermo Dávila.

== Cast ==
- Ivonne Goderich
- Guillermo Dávila
- Junior Álvarez
- Millie Aviles
- Rafael José
- Corina Azopardo
- Henry Salvat
- Lucia Sanoja
- Herman O'Neill
- Flor d'Lotto
- Rene Farrait
