= Sylvia Rexach =

Puerto Rican composer (1922–1961)

- Rexach was the founder of the "Las Damiselas", the first Combo in Puerto Rico consisting entirely of women.

Background information
- Born: Sylvia Regina Rexach González; January 22, 1922; Santurce, Puerto Rico
- Died: October 20, 1961 (aged 39) San Juan, Puerto Rico
- Genres: Bolero
- Occupations: Comedy scriptwriter; poet; singer; composer

Sylvia Regina Rexach González (January 22, 1922 – October 20, 1961) was a Puerto Rican comedy scriptwriter, poet, singer and composer of boleros. Rexach was born and raised in Santurce, Puerto Rico. Her parents were Julio E. Rexach of Fajardo, and María Teresa González, of San Juan, Puerto Rico. There she attended public school and received her primary education. She then went to a private school where she finished her secondary education before attending the Central High School of Santurce. During her high school years, when she was 14 years old, she wrote several poems which were to become part of her musical compositions. She amazed her teachers when she composed "Di, Corazón" (Tell me, Heart) and "Matiz de Amor" (Calm Love). Rexach also learned how to play musical instruments, such as the guitar, the piano and the saxophone at a young age.

The tones of Rexach's compositions varied from the soft and romantic to the harsh and tormented. Among her compositions that became hits in Puerto Rico and abroad were: "Alma Adentro" (Inner Soul, actually a homage to a brother who died in an accident), "Idilio", "Olas y Arenas" (Waves and Sands), "Mi Versión" (My Version), "Nave sin Rumbo" (Wandering Ship), "Di, Corazón" and "Matiz de Amor". She even wrote a humorous novelty song, "Cuchú cuchía", which features Rafael Hernández Marín as a co-composer. Described as "exquisitely fine" and relying on nostalgia and beauty to grasp the listener, Rexach's work was also popular in Venezuela, Mexico, Argentina and Peru, among other Spanish-speaking countries. Her compositions have been recorded by many other artists, such as Marco Antonio Muñiz, Danny Rivera, Gilberto Monroig, Chucho Avellanet, Lucecita Benítez, Juan Luis Barry, Linda Ronstadt, Ednita Nazario, Lourdes Pérez, Lunna, and Maritzaida. Two television specials were made about Sylvia's life, "Sylvia, en tu Memoria" (Sylvia, in your Memory) and Ángela Meyer's "El fondo del Dolor" (In the Deepest Pain) starring Sharon Riley, Sylvia's daughter.

She worked as a radio station as a comical script writer, first for producer Tommy Muñiz, and later for comedian Ramón Rivero "Diplo". She was the founder of the first Combo in Puerto Rico consisting entirely of women. They were named Las Damiselas (The Damsels), and besides Rexach included: Idalia Rosario, Marta Romero, Millita Quiñones, Elena Rita Ortiz, and Ketty Cabán. In 1951, Rexach had a newspaper column called "A Sotto Voce", where she was a music critic. She was also a co-founder of The Puerto Rican Society of Authors, Composers and Music Editors (Sociedad Puertorriqueña de Autores, Compositores y Editores de Música). She was its Secretary Director, a position she held until the day of her death. Musicologist Cristóbal Díaz Ayala described Rexach as "virtually unclassifiable" within the Latin American music of her time, noting how her boleros projected frank sexuality and a calm defiance unusual for the genre. Emilio E. Hyuke described Rexach as not only an artist, but a "skillfull and shrewd writer of great humorist blood, who also possessed an unlimited imagination and creativity". Her writing has been described as "dreamy" and "ahead of her time".

== Artistic career ==
=== Early life ===
While graduating first grade at Escuela Padre Rufo, Rexach was tasked with reciting the poem Analfabeta. In 1932, she joined her sister Dinorah in playing the "heralds of spring" in an event organized by Carmelia Herrera of Central High School. The following year, both girls were cast as jockeys in Reinado Infantil: La Corte del Circo as part of the San Juan Carnival. In 1935, she participated in another school event at La Fortaleza. In 1937, Rexach sisters participated in the Baile Internacional, an event regarded as "traditional" in those days, as part of the delegation that represented Scotland. In March 1937, she was honored at the Puerto Rico Bar Association's building. At the Baile de Coronación del Rey del Palacete, Rexach served as the third year ambassador. Later that year, Rexach appeared as one of the Three Spirit Genies in an adaptation of Mozart's The Magic Flute. She returned to the Baile Internacional in 1938, serving as the flag bearer of the United Kingdom in an edition held at the Ballajá Barracks.

In August 1938, Rexach debuted as part of the play Cuando las flores de pascua son flores de azahar, a comedy of local traditions that was presented at Teatro Paramount. During the winter, she made a presentation at the Casino de Puerto Rico, singing "Mama, Oh, Mama" and was already promoted as a child artist. The following year, Rexach played the court's in an adaptation Giuseppe Verdi's Rigoletto organized by the Central High School's Music Department. Later that year, she was part of a té danzante dance held in honor of Frieda de Galindo. (Note: The té danzante is a type of ballroom dance that was popular in Puerto Rico during the early 20th Century.) Rexach began her artistic career at the age of 13, having learned how to play the guitar, saxophone and piano.

By 1940, Rexach began gaining recognition for the "beauty" of her compositions, when her bolero Matiz de Amor was sung by Josefina Guillermety de Buscaglia in a dance to help Emma Cardona's candidacy to Reina de Mayo of the University of Puerto Rico (UPR). When actor Errol Flynn visited Puerto Rico two months later, he commented on the bolero after Rafael Muñoz and his orchestra played a rendition in his honor. She kept a public profile from that moment onwards making appearances in small events, like a swimming contest in the Escambrón Beach Club and a té danzante organized by the Gamma Gamma sorority. At the age of 15, Rexach's compositions were already well received in Latin America and parts of the United States.

By the age of 21, Rexach had composed 22 boleros, among which were also "Matiz de Amor", "Amargo Amanecer" and "Flor de Amor". In 1943, "Amargo Amanecer" won recognition in a contest held at New York. In Puerto Rico, Rafael Muñoz and his orchestra debuted "Flores de Amor" at the Normandie Hotel. Local cultural magazine La Voz Antillana described her music as "something that raises our spirits and makes us reborn in the hope of something that we never dreamed of". She was joined by half a dozen women from Puerto Rico in these corps. In February 1943, it was announced that Rexach would be traveling abroad to continue superior studies. By August, she had concluded her WAACs basic training at Fort Devens in Massachusetts. While there, she was often asked to sing in clubs, parties and hospitals near the base. In one such visit, a group of Puerto Rican soldiers asked her to sing "La Borinqueña" to them, she took notice of their emotional response. With other artists in the WAACs, Rexach went on tour to Southern California, making stops to perform at various military facilities and Hollywood.

In January 1949, Rexach joined the Cofradía de Artistas Nómadas in an event held at La Fortaleza. In August 1949, Trío Los Murcianos recorded the Rexach and Rafael Hernández collaboration "El amor es una cruz", which was distributed by Casa Mardi. By the end of this year, the local media was already referring to her as a "first order composer". She was one of a group of young Puerto Rican women that were becoming prolific writers, along Aurea Mercedes Balseiro and Ivonne Lastra. Rexach joined Ramito, Diplo and Bobby Capó in a tour to New York, where they made appearances at the Teatro Puerto Rico. During the holidays, Rexach would join Tuti Umpierre, Edmusdo Disdier and other friends to organize parrandas, traditional door to door concerts. Fellow composer Amaury Veray was among his friends. In February 1950, she attended a concert by pianist Glauco D'Atilli at Santurce along her brother Antonio. Two months later, Rexach performed at the Luquillo Country Club as a part of a trio along Millita Quiñones and Elena Rita Ortiz that became known as Las Damiselas, which was accompanied by pianist Andrés Tallada. During the summer, she wrote the script of an episode of WAPA's Como nacieron mis canciones about Puerto Rico's more prolific composer, Rafael Hernández. Rexach and Las Damiselas were brought to perform in a Monday prime time slot at WTIL, which recorded at Teatro San José Mayaguez.

=== Radio, music and theatre ===
In 1950, Rexach wrote Como nacieron mis canciones for WAPA-TV, featuring dramatizations of Hernández's music. She also anticipated that, due to the world becoming easier to travel, dances like the Colombian porro and Venezuelan joropo would become known internationally. The show ran throughout the summer. During this time, Rexach also sang with Ketty Cabán as the first voice in a duo.

In the role as a radio writer, she was responsible for convincing Tommy Muñiz to cast her friend Alma Rosabal de Balines for ¡Que sirvienta!. Besides this show, Rexach also wrote Familia Pérez, Gloria y Miguel, Lluvia de Estrellas, Caravana Camel and Canciones sobre el arcoiris along the producer, José Miguel González and A. Guadalupe. In April 1951, she and Las Damiselas made an appearance at the Coamo Hot Springs along José Miguel Agrelot, Muñiz and other artists. Later in the month, the group joined both of them and Ramón Rivero, Juan Boria, Jose Luis Torregrosa, Pérez Navarro, Violeta Flores, the Pérez Rodríguez duo and the cast of El Colegio de la Alegría in a star studded show held at Teatro Metropolitan in San Juan. This collective of artists was responsible for raising funds for the San Juan Olympic Track Club. Rexach and Las Damiselas were booked to perform at New York. In June 1951, journalist Ernesto Juan Fonfrías donated a locale so that the Sociedad de Autores, Compositores y Editores de Música (SACEM) could organize, when the organization's board for the following year was constituted Rexach was elected to serve in it. That same week, she and Las Damiselas joined the transmission of several WKAQ shows from Camp Buchanan. In April 1951, Rexach participated in a fundraiser for the San Juan Olympic Club held at Teatro Metropolitan in Santurce.

The group joined Muñiz, Boria, Ramón Moreno and the cast of El Colegio de la Alegría at the Colonia Hispanoamericana at Bayamón. Rexach continued balancing the different aspects of her career and making occasional appearances with Las Damiselas, such as in a concert held to celebrate the "Day of the Accountant" in May 1952, joining Torregrosa, Trío Los Sultanes and Carmencita Figueroa. In June 1952, Rexach participated in a homage to composer Manuel G. Tavárez held at Teatro La Perla in Ponce. She also had a participation at the Sociedad de Ingenieros de Puerto Rico's annual assembly held at the Cangrejos Yacht Club and her comedy was interpreted in various events sponsored by Chevrolet and Chrysler at Caribe Motors. On January 29, 1953, the show Fiesta Caribe Motors began transmitting through WKAQ, WPAB and WKJB with Rexach writing the comedy segments. Las Damiselas continued active making appearances appearance in various venues, such as Esther Comas' La Bodega and Don's Night Club.

In May 1953, they joined an event sponsored by Palmolive that gathered several artists and acts from radio and theater at Teatro Tapia. When actor José Ferrer and the Instituto Psicopedagógico joined to promote the debut of the 1952 film Moulin Rouge, the trio was brought in to perform at the gala. During the summer, Sylvia Rexach y su Combo made theatre presentations which were well received by the public. In February 1954, Rexach presented and directed the Show de Futuras Estrellas de Televisión at Teatro Caparra with bringing in several young performers expected to make the crossover to the then-nascent media of television. The following month, she was tasked with organizing the Baile de Artistas at Club Tres Plamas along Mario Cox, opting for an existential masks theme. In October 1954, Rexach wrote the primetime Fiesta a las nueve for WKAQ-TV, featuring Rafael Hernández, produced by Publicidad Badillo and directed by Consuelo Rivera de Otero. Besides Las Damiselas, Rexaah also created Las Golondrinas, appearing in radio, theatre and television both in Puerto Rico and abroad.

In November 1955, Rexach and Las Damiselas were featured in a tele-marathon to raise funds for the Sociedad Pro Bienestar de Niños con Parálisis Cerebral, a non profit that aided children with cerebral palsy. Meanwhile, he songs continued gathering attention, when Bobby Capó adapted the bolero ¿Y entonces?. In October 1956, Rexach participated in a tele-marathon organized by the Puerto Rican Independence Party (PIP) aired through WAPA-TV. In January 1957, Gilberto Thillet recorded her song "En mis sueños". During the summer, the Instituto de Puerto Rico of New York organized a concert at Broadway 2542 where singer Rafael Dick and pianist Jorge González sang her songs as an homage.

During the summer of 1958, Ralph Dick offered a concert of Rexach's work at San Juan. During this time, her music was called "classic within the popular genre". During this time, Pedro Vargas visited Puerto Rico and singled Rexach as the one person that impressed him, calling her a "great composer and artist" and noting that he intended to record an LP with her songs upon returning to Mexico. In July, Rexach announced that she was leaving to that country by the end of summer. However, in August she fell ill and had to undergo surgery at the Ashford Memorial Presbyterian Hospital. In October, WAPA-TV moved another show written by her, Rina y Tito, to the evening slot.

In March 1959, she joined Jacobo Morales and others afiliated to the Asociación Puertorriqueña de Artistas in a caravan to help raise funds for the Hogar del Niño. During this time, Rexach also supported and attended the Festival de Teatro Puertorriqueño organized by the Institute of Puerto Rican Culture (ICP). Her songs Yo era una flor was chosen by soprano Rina de Toledo, accompanied by pianist Elsa Rivera, Salgado when she performed at Teatro La Perla in Ponce during the 100th anniversary of Luis Muñoz Rivera. The soprano repeated this performance at Plaza Antonio R. Barceló, this time in a presentation sponsored by the ICP and the municipality of San Juan, and in July 1960 at the headquarters of the ICP. Tito Lara also adapted "Mi versión" for his album Un ídolo nuevo para América.

In 1960, Spanish directors Juan Fortuny and Arturo Buendía selected four of Rexach's songs to be sung by Manolín Martínez in Probo Films' El Otro Camino. In May 1960 a collaboration between Rexach and Tuti Umpierre title "¿Que has hecho?" won the first place at the Festival de la Canción del Caribe representing Puerto Rico. In August 1960, Rexach returned to Teatro Tapia to support Eugene O'Neill's "Todos los hijos de Dios tienen alas " at the Festival Puertorriqueño de Teatro Universal. As part of SPACEM, she attended a horse racing event sponsored by the record label. In December 1960, Rexach collaborated with the UPR's faculty to raise Christmas bonus funds by providing the entertainment in a dinner. She also participated in the SPACEM general assembly. For writing the song "Mi versión", she was voted the female author of the year. Rexach received her trophy for this win in Show Ford. On January 12, 1961, she was elected part of the SPACEM board, taking the role of general secretary. During this time, Rexach joined the Asociación Puertorriqueña de Artistas y Técnicos de Espectáculos (APATE) in protests against Barry Yellen, who refused to include Puerto Rican talent in the San Juan Drama Festival. In February 1961, Myrta Silva debuted one of her songs. In April 1961, Rexach performed at a cocktail held at the Caribe Hilton, playing the piano and signing several of her own songs. Among the repertoire were some unreleased song, among which "Dios de Oro" gathered attention. Rexach described it as her "most profound song", a metaphor that takes human feelings and presents them as jewels. Her song "Rombie" was written as a homage to a fallen friend. That month she also received a homage by the Río Piedras Chamber of Commerce that was transmitted through local radio station WRIO. In life, her songs sung by some of the most notable artists from Puerto Rico and Latin America. However, heer music was considered "very good but not commercial ", for which only about half of her work received widespread distribution in Puerto Rico.

Her health began deteriorating during the second half of the year, leading to several months of decline. In October 1961, Rexach was hospitalized in an intensive care unit at the Woman's Hospital in Santurce. The illness kept her inner circle concerned and constantly visiting her during the following days. After two weeks of treatment, Rexach died on October 20, 1961. Her wake took place at Funeraria Buxeda in her native Santurce, before being buried at Cementerio Buxeda in Isla Verde. A guitar was laid to rest along her body, it is unknown who brought the instrument to the burial. Rexach and her family were Catholic and the Holy Rosary for the Faithful Departed held for her was open to the public. At the time, it was reported that Rexach had died of cancer. She was an alcoholic during her final days. Her death certificate states the cause as an intestinal obstruction, complicated by a duodenal atresia.

The funeral procession was attended by Puerto Ricans of various classes and municipalities. Her casket was carried by several artists, including musicians and composers. Rafael Hernández brought funeral wreath with the words "A mi hija blanca" and members of SPACEM carried a flag bearing the group's logo with them. She was buried at Cementerio Buxeda in Carolina, Puerto Rico. Her death continued being an island wide topic for days. Her music was acquired by Peer International Corporation of Puerto Rico. The following month, Rina de Toledo homaged her during a presentation at Teatro Popular at Santa Isabel by singing "Yo era una flor". A year after her death, radio stations dedicated special shows to her memory. Meanwhile, the Sociedad de Actores y Compositores held a ceremony at her resting place.

== Personal life ==
Rexach was born in Santurce to Julio Rexach Porrata and María Teresa González, one of seven siblings along Dinorah, María Teresa, Ena, Hilda and Lydia. Her father was a pharmacist and well known in the municipality. At the age of 14 she composed "Di, corazón". The song was recorded by Rafael Muñoz and his orchestra. It remained popular for decades, being recorded by José Luis Moneró and others. The arrangements of her first performance were charged at $4. Her aunt, Pepita González, was responsible for creating an ensemble that Rexach wore while performing "Di, corazón" in her artistic debut. Lucho Gatica recorded "Y entonces", which became one of her most successful international songs. Her repertoire was not written with commercialization in mind, being described as reflecting "a troubled soul, some autobiographical, and many distilling regret and pain". It included "Olas y Arenas", "Y Entonces Yo Era Una Flor", "Mi versión", "Mi subconciente amor". She often collaborated with guitarist Tuti Umpierre, one of her closest friends along fellow composer Katty Cabán. Rexach had three children, Sharon, Sylvia Jr. and William. After leaving piano classes as a child, Rexach learned to play by ear as a teenager and used this knowledge to organize a student orchestra at Central High. In life she was already regarded as one of the most renowned and beloved musical figures in Puerto Rico. Rexach began pre-legal courses at the University of Puerto Rico at Río Piedras (UPR), but left before graduation to join the WACS (Women Army Corps Service). She married army officer William J. Riley, with whom she had three children, including actress/singer Sharon Riley. The marriage eventually ended in a divorce and she returned to Puerto Rico. Sharon Riley sang her songs, explaining that she knew how she liked them to be sung. Sylvita herself composed music.

She lived most of her life at Parada 21 in Santurce and would host her friends there on Fridays. Her mother recognized her musical potential since a young age, contracting teacher Rosa Sicardó to instruct her, but she would often escape these classes to compose her own music. Of all the songs in her repertoire, "Olas y Arenas" was Rexach's favorite song and she would note this when it was played. After Rexach played "Di, corazón" in a Central High event at Escambrón in Puerta de Tierra, music professor Miguel Miranda approached her and recommended registering the piece. It only took a week for the song to be recorded afterwards. For radio she wrote Gloria y Miguel, La familia Pérez and Violeta Flores. Rexach was fond of the stories in Abelardo Díaz Alfaro's Terrazo, and the author shared this admiration back at her work. Following her death, Moneró recorded another of her songs, this time "Matiz de amor".

Rexach first became involved with journalism by writing for El Diario de Puerto Rico. During the summer of 1955, her daughter Sharon Riley debuted in Pepe Caparra, where she interpreted the role of "Titina" niece of José Miguel Agrelot's titular character before joining Diplo in radio. In life, Rexach was described as a "notable and sincere composer". Rexach believed in independence for Puerto Rico and was an activist towards this goal. She was also regarded as a supporter of several progressive policies. During her youth she was regarded as a "tomboy" by some, due to being an athlete and enjoying physical activities like skating. She wrote an unpublished comedy book titled El último del Banco, o el último de la fila.

== Legacy ==
In her deathbed, Rexach lamented not being able to write her final song. Myrta Silva, who was among the people that visited her during this day, composed "Mi trágico final" shortly afterwards. Guillermo Venegas Llovera gave the mourning farewell. In 1967, William, died under unclear circumstances at the age of 22 and was found at a rooftop in Mahattan, New York. In April 1962, Vicentico Valdés published the LP Una vez más, which featured the bolero "¿Que has hecho?".

Rina de Toledo continued performing "Yo era una flor" in her future appearances. In Marta Romero Canta, the titular singer adapted four songs from her repertoire. In November 1962, Ruth Fernández and Orquesta Panamericana released the single "Homenaje a Sylvia Rexach". In their Tuya en Septiembre album, Paquitín Soto and Los Murcianos revisited "Olas y Arenas". In January 1963, Sharon sang "Y entonces" at an appearance at the Club de Caborrojeños Ausentes in the Bronx, New York. The Club de Oro dedicated the 1963 Festival de la Canción Popular Puertorriqueña to Rexach. To open the act, which was attended by her mother and daughters Sylvia and Sharon, Amaury Veray read the piece "Invocación a Sylvia Rexach”.

On January 20, 1965, the Institute of Puerto Rican Culture (ICP) observed her birthday. In his album I'll always love you Tito Rodríguez adapted the song "Mi version". Prior to her death, Rexach had granted Roberto Rodríguez Suárez the rights to write her biography and in May 1965 the author returned to Puerto Rico with the intention to interview her family, friends and acquaintances to complete this task. One of her unfulfilled goals, creating an organization of women interested in composing, became a reality when the Club de Damas Compositoras de Puerto Rico was founded at San Juan. By this time she was regarded as "legendary" and referred to as "the best female composer we have to date" in the media, with some concern that the ICP was falling short in promoting her work. Fellow composer Alberto Ferrer stated that he admired Rexach. In the LP Di Corazón, produced by Harry Rexach, Carmen Delia Dipiní and Rafael Díaz recorded renditions of a dozen songs from her repertoire. In September 1966, a cocktail was held in his memory at Top of the First club, where the LP La música de Sylvia Rexach — Di Corazón was presented. Rexach was among the composers whose work was featured at the ICP's Fiesta de Música Puertorriqueña held at Teatro Tapia in October 1966.

On the 5th anniversary of her death, Sharon, Tuti Umpierre and Dean Zayas held a homage concert at Café-Teatro La Tierruca at Old San Juan. In October 1966, the ICP held a homage concert for several Puerto Rican composers at Teatro Tapia, with the work of Rexach being featured among more than a dozer other authors. In 1967, Umpierre and Riley returned to La Tierruca to play part of her repertoire.

In the LP Que bonito es Puerto Rico, Juan Luis recorded a version of "Olas y Arena". The second edition of Fiesta de la Música Puertorriqueña opened with a homage concert to Rexach, which featured a return of the groups Las Damiselas and El Combo, which her daughters Sylvia and Sharon taking her place singing. Recordings that she made in magnetophonic films on July 3, 1958 were converted into an LP titled Sylvia Rexach canta a Sylvia Rexach which was first distributed in that event. Published by the ICP, the production sold out and became hard to find.

The 1967 edition of the Fiesta de Música Puertorriqueña was held in her honor at Teatro Tapia, Las Damiselas (Elena Rita Ortiz and Millita Quiñones) and El Combo (Carmencita Figueroa, Blanca Romero, Lucy Boscana, Ketty Cabán and Fernando Miranda) joined her daughters Sylvia and Sharon, with Cabán and Roger Maldonado debuting homage songs. The event was well received and sold out the venue. A year later, Sharon Riley revisited her repertoire at El Laberinto. In 1969, the ICP sponsored a concert with an adaptation of her song "Alma Adentro" by Carmencita Figueroa's Ritmos Melódicos group at Ponce and Sabana Grande. In 1970, composer Miguel Nieves Ortiz revealed that her biggest artistic influence was Rexach. When Sexteto Lírico was contracted to perform at the Sheraton Hotel, Rina Toledo was brought in and brought with her "Yo era una flor". Insarte Taller Folklórico Puertorriqueño adapted her music as part of their experimental art. During the summer of 1971, Sharon Riley joined Juan Carlos to perform some of her repertoire at Club Ocho Puertas at Old San Juan. During this time, Duo Irizarry de Córdova released the LP La Música de Sylvia Rexach. In October 1971, the ICP and Centro Cultural de Yabucoa sponsored the play El Amor en la Canción de Sylvia Rexach organized by Teatro del Sesenta (of which Sharon Riley was part). This organization joined Producciones Yunque and made Teatro Cervantes at Puerto de Tierra in San Juan their base, rechristening it Teatro Sylvia Rexach in early 1972. When explaining the renaming, Producciones Yunque and Teatro del 60 noted that she had "left her art to the Puerto Rican people". The venue was reinaugurated on February 19, featuring the play as debuting production. That same year, Marco Antonio Muñiz made her work a central part of his season at the Caribe Hilton.

In 1973, composer Rafael Elvira published an LP that included adaptations of her work. When Carmen Delia Dipiní was contracted bybthe Caribe Hilton to perform a recurrent show, she included the repertoire of Rexach.

During the 1970s, Juan Luis and Reneé Barrios were recurrent interpreters of her repertoire. In 1975, Sharon Reilly sang some of her mother's songs on International Woman's Day. Afterwards, she joined Dean Zayas to do homage her and Ketty Cabán at Club Ocho Puertas in Old San Juan. There an unedited Rexach song was unveiled. The presentation grew up to become the Había una vez… Dos corazones concert-play sponsored by the APATE as part of the Acuario project that began at Santa Isabel and toured other venues including Teatro Candilejas and Bariloche at San Juan. Their performances of her repertoire were adapted for the first episode of Televisión por Fuera filmed at Parque Muñoz Rivera.

In 1976, the Interamerican University presented Dos Mujeres De Mi Tierra homaging Rexach and Julia de Burgos. At Ponce, her repertoire was frequently homaged by singer Marta Ivette Santiago. When Música en Dos Tiempos debuted a new season at WIPR-TV, Juan Luis sang "Nave sin rumbo". In October 21, 1977, WAPA-TV aired the special Sylvia en tu memoria, named after Roger Maldonado's eponymous song of and which featured Juan Luis and Sharon Riley adapting several of her songs. The show was aired again in May 1978. That month, guitarist Federico Cordero offered a concert that featured her music at the ICP. Pianist Papio Paz credited Rexach's style while composing Sortilegio. In June 1978, Riley and Umpierre joined Prodducciones La Escoba Bruja for La Noche de Sylvia Rexach at Guayama. Her songs were also converted to foreign rhythms, as was the case of Olas y Arenas being reinvented as a guaguancó. In January 1979, student René Ruiz unveiled a mural of Rexach at Río Piedras Heights, following a proposal by fellow student Blanca Ortiz. The following month, Riley returned to Ocho Puertas to revisit her mother's repertoire. In March 1979, her daughter rejoined Umpierre for the concert Recordando a Sylvia Rexach held at Aibonito. During the summer, Orvil Miller adapted her work for a series of shows at Café-Restaurant Tetuán.

A street was named after her in the Levittown sector of the municipality of Toa Baja. In 1980, the Chase Manhattan Bank's Christmas special featured part of her work adapted by the Orquesta Filarmónica Arturo Samohano. During this time, Teatro del Sesenta also launched a campaign to purchase Teatro Sylvia Rexach and José Alicea created two pieces depicting her, a silk screen print and an etched engraving. The following year, the Interamerican University hosted a concert where Orvil Miller sang unreleased songs of Rexach and Rafael Hernández. Composer Sandra Roldán sang some of her songs during a concert at Club Ocho Puertas.

In 1981, Awilda Carbia created Desconcierto '81 where she homaged the screenwriter aspect of Rexach, who had authored several of the scripts of the radio comedies Macario Bandera, La sirvienta and Gloria y Miguel where she had acted. When the Sociedad de Autores swore in a new board, Paula Burgos performed songs based on the work of Rexach and Julia de Burgos. In the UPR book Mujeres de Puerto Rico: Lecturas suplementarias para Esdudiantes de Escuela Elemental, she is discussed along María Tirado Cordovés and De Burgos as cultural icons. In September 1981, the ICP sponsored a concert where Américo Boschetti sang the work of several authors, including her.

Throughout the 1980s, Sharon Riley made occasional performances of her mother's repertoire in different venues. Yeyita Cervoni was noted as holding on to some of Rexach's unreleased songs during this time. Gilbert Mamery produced an episode of Los Compositores y sus Canciones in her homage for Telemundo. In May 1983, baritone Carlos Serrano adapted Rexach's repertoire in a series organized at Old San Juan.

At New York, Hilda Bracero included the work of Rexach her performances at the Trocadero, the Flamenco, Hurrah Discotheque, the Waldorf Astoria, Sheraton Center, New York Hilton, Astoria Manor, Canrnegie Hall, Lincoln Center and other venues. She was among several artists featured in the 1982 Antología de la Música Popular Puertorriqueña held at Teatro Tapia. Antonio Barasorda held a homage to Rexach and Rafael Hernández. In 1983, poet Angelamaría Dávila listed Rexach, Clara Lair and Julia de Burgos as inspirations. Alberto Carrión adapted her repertoire for the ballet Dos musas del agua, which also homaged Julia de Burgos and was enacted by Ballets de San Juan. When Teatro del 60 celebrated its 20th anniversary, they published a calendar that included a page dedicated to Rexach. Her music was once again featured in the 1983 Fiesta de la Música Puertorriqueña, this time sang by Rafi Escudero. In 1984, Raoul González adapted her song Es tarde ya to English. That year, Riley and Umpierre reunited for another homage at San Germán and continued performing as a duo during the following months.

Her song "El Americano" was featured in the concert Concierto de vellonera con las bohemias organized at Centro de Bellas Artes. On March 24, 1984, Roberto Rodríguez Suárez debuted the biographical play Nave sin rumbo at New York. Her music was also adapted by foreign artists, such as Dominican singer Angela Carrasco. The ballet "Sylvia" was composed as a homage by Alberto Carrión and included in the show Dos Musas del Agua: Julia de Burgos y Sylvia Rexach which featured Lucecita Benítez and the Ballets de San Juan.

In October 1984, Roberto Pumarejo adapted some of her work in tango. That same month, one of the trolley that offered transport at Old San Juan was baptized after her. As the 20th anniversary of her death neared, Riley retook the homages, both in Puerto Rico and abroad. As usual, Umpierre joined her on the guitar. The 1985 Festival de Teatro Puertorriqueño featured Dos Musas del Agua: Sylvia y Julia, with the play also being presented in other venues.

Her repertoire became a recurrent theme at Club 1919 at the Condado Beach Hotel, being interpreted by different artists. During the summer, a sand sculpting contest named Olas y Arena '85 was organized as a homage. Among the pieces played by the Puerto Rico Symphony Orchestra to open the Festival Interamericano de las Artes at Centro de Bellas Artes was Olas y arenas. In October 1985, Riley and Umpierre debuted A 20 años de la muerte de Sylvia Rexach at Club 1919. Soprano Migdalia Batiz included her repertoire as part of the program Romance Puertorriqueño. On the 20th anniversary of her death, public vigils were held before the Capitolio and at Teatro Sylvia Rexach. Other homages during this time included an act where the duo of Miguel Alcaide and Roberto Pumarejo adapted her songs, which was offered in live concerts and in the El Show de las 12.

In 1986, Josy Latorre adapted Rexach's repertoire to jazz in Sentimiento para una sola voz. The following month, Cheo Feliciano adapted her songs. To celebrate Woman's Week, the orchestra of the UPR at Cayey organized the event Los poesmas de Julia de Burgos y las canciones de Sylvia Rexach. In May 1986, Telemundo transmitted the special Mi mamá Sylvia Rexach starring Riley. During the summer, Danny Rivera adapted Alma Adentro. During this time, Frieda Stubbe adapted "Olas y Arenas" to Portuguese. This year, the Festival Interamericano de las Artes featured "Las Bohemias y Sylvia" featuring Riley, Georgina Borri, Claribel Medna, Giselle Solís, María del Carmen Rodríguez, Virgen Orta and Esther Santiago in a homage which was later presented at other venues.

During the fall, Riley, Benítez, the Ballets of San Juan, Alberto Carrión and the PRSO presented Triología de Artistas in homage to Rexach, Julia de Burgos and Luis Pales Matos. Among the artists that recorded her songs was Marco Antonio Muñiz. In 1987, José Miguel Agrelot stated that one of his favorite songs was "Di, corazón".

In the 28th Festival de Teatro Puertorriqueño Ballets of San Juan once again enacted the ballet Sylvia. Her work was also featured at the Conservatory of Music of Puerto Rico, where it was a centerpiece of a concert by Federico Cordero Jr. and Inocencio Rivera. In June 1988, the Café-Teatro Sylvia Rexach was inaugurated within Centro de Bellas Artes, which featured a painting of her done by Antonio Martorell. Jossy Latorre's concert Sylvia Rexach en jazz was among its first shows, featuring adaptations of her repertoire by pianist Amuni. This was spun off into its own act and toured other venues.

When Lunna was beginning her career, she incorporated a mixture of Rexach's repertoire into her concerts. Some time afterwards, a proposal to name Calle Del Parque in Santurce after her was circulated. Her birth was observed by several multinational corporations, including Coca-Cola in 1989 and Chase Bank in 1990.

In January 1990 the exhibition Y entonces featuring pictures, newspaper clippings, posters and paintings by Martorell, Candido Ortiz, José Alicea, Edil Manuel Dávila, Riley and Umpierre, among others, debuted at Museo Historico de Caguas. Guitarist Federico Cordero also adapted her work during the week of her birthday. The Trío de Voces de Puerto Rico recorded "Canción amarga con matiz de amor" honoring both Rexach and Julia de Burgos. Her work was included in the opening exhibits of the Casa Museo de la Música Puertorriqueña at Ponce. In 2001, Rexach was posthumously inducted into the International Latin Music Hall of Fame. There is a theater "El Teatro Sylvia Rexach" named after Rexach in San Juan and in the Luis A. Ferre Center of Fine Arts, there is a Sylvia Rexach Cafe Theater. On May 29, 2014, the Legislative Assembly of Puerto Rico honored 12 illustrious women who by virtue of their merits and legacies stand out in the history of Puerto Rico with plaques in the "Plaza en Honor a la Mujer Puertorriqueña" (Plaza Honoring Puerto Rican Women) in San Juan. Rexach was among those honored.

Puerto Rican vocalist Maritzaida and American guitarist and arranger AJ Weibe have undertaken a multi-album project focused on preserving the music of Rexach and Tutti Umpierre. Across five releases between 2024 and 2026, they recorded 45 compositions by Rexach and Umpierre, a collection described by the Fundación Nacional para la Cultura Popular as the largest body of their music recorded by a single artist. The project was developed in collaboration with Rexach's family, particularly her daughter Sharon Riley Rexach, who served as principal musical adviser and worked with Maritzaida and Weibe on the interpretation and arrangements of the compositions.

== See also ==
- List of Puerto Ricans
- Puerto Rican songwriters
- List of female composers
- List of composers by nationality
- History of women in Puerto Rico
