= Amneris Morales =

Puerto Rican actress

- Born: July 7, 1958 (age 66); San Juan, Puerto Rico
- Occupation: Actress
- Years active: 1980s–present
- Spouse(s): Miguel Angel Suarez (died, 2009)
- Children: 1 (Belange Rodriguez)

Amneris Morales (born July 7, 1958) is a Puerto Rican television, theater and film actress.

== Biography ==
Morales is a native of Puerto Rico's capital of San Juan.

She expressed a desire to become an actress since age 5, and she was immediately signed onto acting classes under actress and teacher Victoria Espinoza.

Later on, Morales joined the University of Puerto Rico, studying psychology and acting there, the latter under well-known Puerto Rican playwright, Dean Zayas. She decided to study psychology in order to apply those studies when performing as an actress by giving her characterizations a psychological edge.

== Acting career ==
Soon, Morales began a television acting career which saw her act in some of the most famous telenovelas in Puerto Rican television history, such as canal 4's "Yo Se Que Mentia", 'Vivir Para Ti" and "Poquita Cosa". Morales was a prolific television actress in Puerto Rico during that era.

After a stint acting in Argentina (where she appeared in a series of telenovelas), Morales moved in 2016, to New York, New York, where she has been busy in theater with an organization named "Repertorio Español" ("Spanish Repertoire") with which she has acted in a Federico Garcia Lorca play named "La Casa de Bernarda Alba" ("Bernarda Alba's House") and "Un Matrimonio a La Caribeña" ("Caribbean Style Matrimony"). She has also organized a film festival, named the "Frenzy Short Film Fest".

== Personal life ==
Morales was married for nine days to the legendary Puerto Rican actor, Miguel Angel Suarez during 2009, before he died of cancer that same year. The couple had lived together for 14 years.

By 2012, she announced on the Puerto Rican newspaper, El Nuevo Dia, that she was dating a lawyer.

Morales was sued by Suarez's daughter, Alondra Suárez Huddo, for the amount that Morales was going to receive from residuals due to the late actor from his various participations in Hollywood films (most notably, 1980's Stir Crazy), which was sent by the Screen Actors Guild and which was now going to Morales' hands.

Morales is the mother of actress Belange Rodriguez, and the two once competed against each other for an Ace award, for their mutual participation in a play named "Julia de Burgos, Criatura del Agua" ("Julia de Burgos, Water Creature") about the life of Puerto Rican poet Julia de Burgos, which was shown in New York City.

== See also ==
- List of Puerto Ricans
