= Millie Aviles =

Puerto Rican actress and singer

Milagros "Millie" Aviles (alternatively known as Milly Aviles) is a Puerto Rican actress and singer. She was born on November 20, 1964 in Santurce, Puerto Rico. She is also known as a telenovela actress from the golden era of telenovelas in Puerto Rico. Aviles was the main female lead star, acting alongside male lead star Braulio Castillo, hijo, in three telenovelas: Alejandra in 1987, Andrea in 1988 and Pacto de Amor in 1989. She also acted in 1984's Diana Carolina.

== Singing career ==
Aviles had a single, "Yo no se Porque" ("I Don't Know Why"), which was the theme song of her soap opera, Alejandra.

== Personal ==
Aviles' sister is actress Maricarmen Aviles. Millie Aviles was once romantically linked to musical producer Edgardo Diaz, director of boy band Menudo. Aviles lives in the United States.

== In popular culture ==
Aviles is played by Amanda Rivera Torres in the Amazon Prime Video miniseries based on the success of Menudo, Subete a mi moto.

== See also ==
- List of Puerto Ricans
