= Axel Anderson =

German actor (1929–2012)

- Born: Axel Levy; December 11, 1929; Berlin, Weimar Republic
- Died: December 16, 2012 (aged 83); San Juan, Puerto Rico
- Occupation: Actor
- Spouse: Helena Montalban (m. 1960—1970)

Axel Anderson (December 11, 1929 – December 16, 2012) was a German actor who was very popular in his adopted homeland of Puerto Rico.

== Biography ==
=== Early life ===
Anderson was born Axel Levy to a Jewish family in Berlin, Germany. In 1936 Anderson's family escaped the Holocaust by emigrating to Paraguay. Due to political instability in Paraguay, Anderson's family soon moved to Argentina. Anderson started acting as a teenager, working at the Teatro Alemán Independiente, a small theater troupe mainly composed of German expatriates who performed in German.

During the 1950s, Anderson moved his young family, including wife Helena, to Bogotá, Colombia where he worked in theater. The family later moved to the Dominican Republic. During his time in the Dominican Republic, Anderson reportedly clashed with the politics of the Rafael Trujillo regime, being forced to emigrate one more time. He and his family settled in Puerto Rico where they have remained ever since.

=== Career ===
Anderson made his debut in Puerto Rican television with a sitcom named Qué Pareja, a local version of I Love Lucy. He also performed in theater and other short television productions. The actor quickly established himself as a leading man, landing several leading roles in local novelas or soap operas. Early in his career, he starred in a novela titled Cuando los hijos condenan in which Anderson and co-star Marta Romero shared the first on-screen kiss in the history of Puerto Rican television.

Anderson also starred in one of the first major motion pictures produced in Puerto Rico, Maruja. His film career continued with roles in Spanish and U.S. films, including Battle of the Bulge (1965) and Bananas (1971). He also participated in the Spanish dubs of several Hollywood films of the 1940s and 1950s as well as of many American TV shows.

In his last 20 years, Anderson remained one of the leading actors in Puerto Rico and continually acted in major local and international productions, including a small role as the bank director in the Sylvester Stallone thriller Assassins.

Anderson (lyrics) and Tony Croatto (music) co-wrote Agüeybaná, a song dedicated to the memory of the most important Taino "Cacique" of the pre-colonial Puerto Rico, recorded by Nelly y Tony and later by Haciendo Punto En Otro Son, which became a major hit in the 70s.

Anderson died on December 16, 2012, in San Juan, Puerto Rico from cancer.

== Filmography ==
| Year | Title | Role | Notes |
|---|---|---|---|
| 1944 | The Master Race | Nazi Officer | Uncredited |
| 1944 | An American Romance | Immigrant | Uncredited |
| 1959 | Maruja | Jean Pierre | |
| 1959 | El Otro Camino | | |
| 1963 | Thunder Island | | Uncredited |
| 1964 | Aquella joven de blanco | | |
| 1965 | Finger On the Trigger | McNamara | |
| 1965 | Battle of the Bulge | German Army messenger | |
| 1970 | The Delta Factor | | |
| 1971 | Bananas | Man Tortured | |
| 1977 | Mi aventura en Puerto Rico | | |
| 1993 | La guagua aérea | Padre Gautier | |
| 1994 | Desvío al paraíso | Clark | |
| 1995 | Manhattan Merengue! | Super | |
| 1995 | Assassins | Bank President | |
| 1996 | The Disappearance of Garcia Lorca | Ortega | |
| 1998 | The Face at the Window | Uncle Pablo | |
| 1998 | Undercurrent | Carlos Rivera Sr | |
| 1999 | Paging Emma | Charlie | |
| 1999 | Paradise Lost | General Díaz | |
| 2001 | Entre los dioses del desprecio | | |
| 2003 | Celestino y el vampiro | Siegfried Von Krank | |
| 2004 | Desamores | Casimiro Leyva | |
| 2005 | Judíos en el espacio o ¿Por qué es differente esta noche a las demás noches? | Mauricio | |
| 2005 | Taínos | Mr. Cordero (Sara's Grandfather) | |
| 2006 | Entremedio | Cesar / Dr. Gutierrez | |
| 2007 | The Reaping | the Blind Man | |
| 2011 | El Detective Cojines | Viejo Rico | |
| 2012 | Los condenados | Michael Puttnam | |
| 2016 | Riding 79 | Cayin | (final film role) |

== Recordings ==
=== OPUS 1 ===
- Martes 2 de la Tarde
  - Letra de Axel Anderson
- Por Eso Que Llaman Amor
- Emigrante
- Ahora Sé
- Inventario
- El Pasado Ya Pasó
- Para Elisa
- Mis Cinco Sentidos
- A Que No Sabes A Quien Ví
- El Coro

== See also ==
- List of Puerto Ricans
