= Camille Carrión =

Puerto Rican actress

- Born: Carmen Cecilia Ernestina del Socorro Carrión Enjuto; March 30, 1946 (age 79); Santurce, Puerto Rico
- Occupations: Actress; businesswoman
- Years active: 65
- Children: Paloma Suau
- Relatives: Rafael Carrión Sr. (grandfather), Richard Carrión (cousin)

Camille Carrión, formally Carmen Cecilia Ernestina del Socorro Carrión Enjuto (born 30 March 1946) is a Puerto Rican actress and businesswoman, best known for her contributions to television, theatre and radio.

== Early life ==
Camille Carrión was born on March 30, 1946, in Santurce, San Juan, Puerto Rico. She is the daughter of William "Billy" Carrión and Carmen Enjuto, and she was brought up in San Juan, Puerto Rico. Her paternal grandfather was Rafael Carrión Pacheco, one of the founding fathers of the Banco Popular de Puerto Rico. She formally began her artistic career as a teenager in the theatrical group Teatro Musical, directed by Robert Cox, with Raúl Juliá, Johanna Rosaly, Roy Brown and others. Early in her career, she played in productions at the Tapia Theater in Old San Juan of well-known Broadway Musicals including Bye, Bye, Birdie, by Adams & Strouse (1962); Little Mary Sunshine, by Rick Besoyan (1965) and Time Remembered, by Jean Anouilh (1967).

After graduating from Saint John's School in Puerto Rico, she went to the Boston Conservatory of Music, Drama & Dance, to study musical theatre. She stayed for only two years, after being offered the role of Maria in The Sound of Music at the Tapia Theater in September 1966, at the end of her sophomore year. The musical was such a success that she didn't return to Boston.

== International fame ==
After starring in various successful telenovelas in Puerto Rico, (Cuando la rival es una hija, with Ofelia D'Acosta and Axel Anderson and Melodía Otoñal with Esteban de Pablos on Telemundo / Chanel 2), Carrión was recruited to star with Alfredo Mayo, María Jesús Aguirre, Elder Barber, and Josefina de la Torre, in the Spanish premiere of Sound of Music (Sonrisas y lágrimas in Spain) at the Teatro de la Zarzuela, in Madrid. This opened on September 25, 1968, and ran for 6 months. During her stay in Spain, she married Catalan photographer and director, Gabriel Suau.

== Television career in Puerto Rico ==
Back in Puerto Rico, Carrión returned to television, starring in telenovelas on all of the local stations including Gabriela y Belinda on WAPA TV / Channel 4, Una vida para amarte (1970) on WRIK TV / Channel 7, and Una sombra entre los dos with Rolando Barral and Pilar Arenas on Telemundo / Channel 2. She was also re-hired by WAPA TV to star with Daniel Lugo in María del Mar, produced by Tommy Muñiz.

In 1972, after the birth of her daughter Paloma Suau, she completed her BA in Humanities at the University of Puerto Rico. In 1974, Carrión was hired by KLRN TV, in San Antonio, Texas to play the role of Miss Hernández in the children's series Carrascolendas, which aired on PBS. In 1978, she completed her master's degree in Hispanic Literature, at New York University's campus in Madrid, Spain.

Back in Puerto Rico, she went back to television for La jibarita, with Alba Nydia Díaz and Jean Carlo Simancas on Channel 11. This was followed by El amor nuestro de cada día with Johanna Rosaly and Jean Carlo Simancas, on WAPA TV (1980); and Viernes social (1981); María Eugenia (1981-1982) y Modelos, S.A. (1982) Telemundo, Channel 2. She took the leading role in Vivir Para Ti, with Argentinean leading man Pablo Alarcón and Ulises Brenes in the role of el general Murillo. (WAPA TV 1982-1983). This was the most successful role of her television career.

In 1985, Carrión created a theatrical production company, Producciones MECA, with Ángela Meyer. Their theatrical productions included Casa de mujeres, Death on the Nile by Agatha Christie and The Women by Clare Booth Luce. Later, they formed Empresas MECA, to produce television shows. On Channel 11, WLII TV they produced one of the most famous 'noon shows' on the island: Ellas al mediodía, with Gladys Rodríguez, Marilyn Pupo, Elia Enid Cadilla, Sharon Riley, Claribel Medína and Carrión, along with various short soap operas that were inserted in the programs.

In 1988, Carrión established Latino Television International, to produce Latino Video Billboard, then returned to Channel 11 to produce and host some new shows including: Ahora and En familia on Channel 6, and Somos únicos for children (1991-1992).

== Radio career ==
Carrión became one of the best known radio personalities in Puerto Rico as host of the weekday morning show Hello, on WIAC/Sistema 102 FM with Héctor Marcano and Jesse Calderón. Later, she went on to host the popular weekday afternoon show Happy Hour on WFID 95.7 FM/Radio Fidelity.

== Meditation teacher ==
In 2004 Carrión began to study meditation, after taking a course with Deepak Chopra, and in 2007 she became a certified Chopra Center instructor. Carrión now resides between Puerto Rico and Cordes-sur-Ciel in France.

== See also ==
- Richard Carrión
- Paloma Suau
- List of Puerto Ricans
