= Pablo Alarcón (actor) =

Argentine actor (born 1945)

Rodolfo Francisco Marabotto
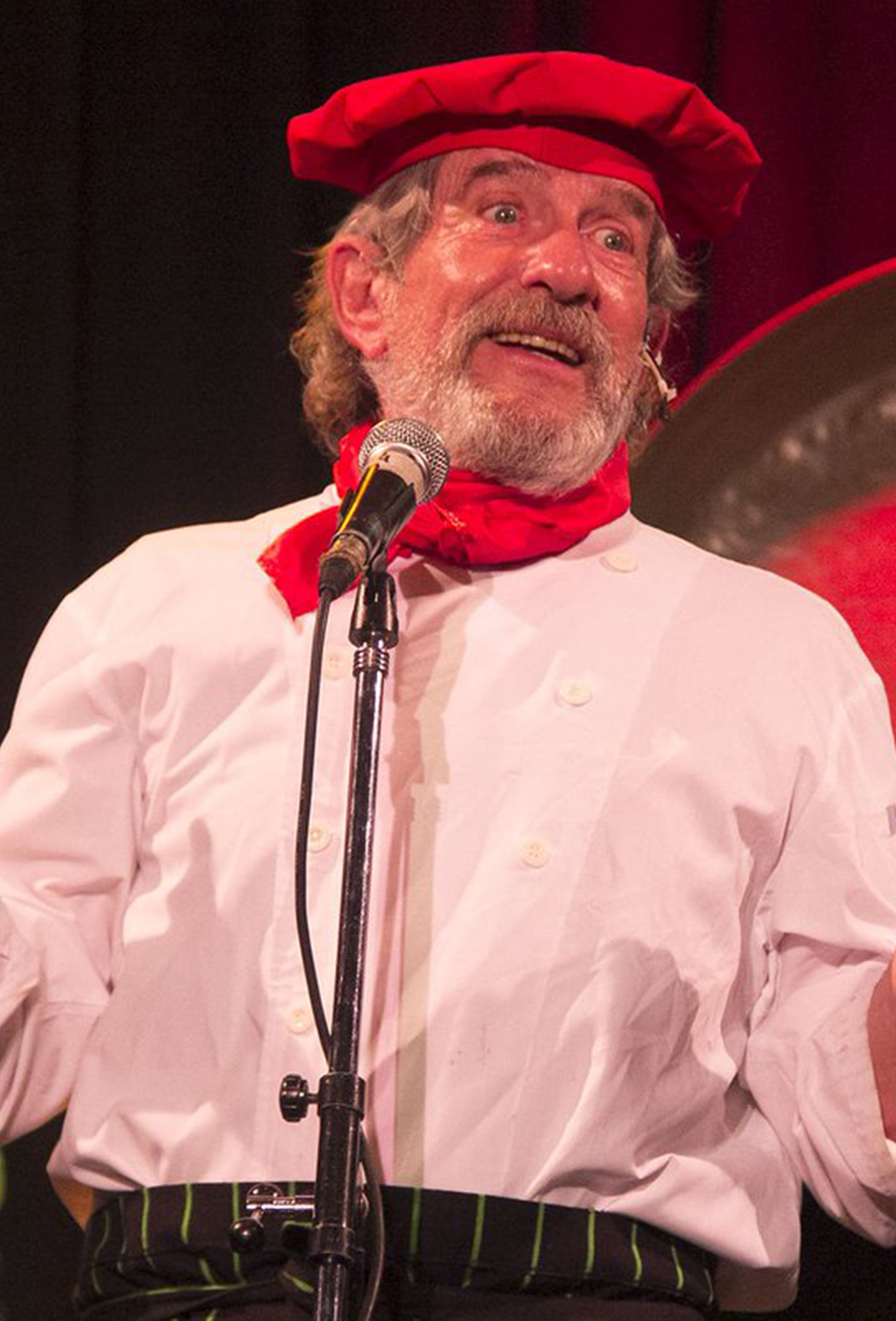
- Alarcón in 2019
- Born: September 9, 1945 (age 80); Pellegrini, Buenos Aires province
- Other names: Pablo Alarcón
- Occupation: actor

Rodolfo Francisco Marabotto (born September 9, 1945), better known as Pablo Alarcón, is an Argentine actor. In 1990 he performed in the Off-Off-Broadway production Amazonia.

== Biography ==
Alarcón was born in Pellegrini, Buenos Aires province. He lived a normal childhood, showing signs of wanting to become an actor since then.

During the 1970s and 1980s, Alarcón participated in a number of Argentine telenovelas and films. His participation in these gave Alarcón much popularity across his home country, as he became a favorite of the female audience there. During that decade, he married fellow actress Monica Jouvet. Jouvet died in a car accident in 1981.

He reached international celebrity when WAPA-TV of Puerto Rico signed him in 1983 to make telenovelas for them. Alarcón starred alongside Camille Carrion in the international hit Vivir Para Ti, which is generally considered by Puerto Rican television critics to be one of the best soap operas ever made in the country. WAPA-TV sold the soap opera to stations in Venezuela, Mexico, Colombia, Chile and other important Latin American markets where Alarcón was not well known before. In addition, since WAPA-TV's transmissions reached the United States Virgin Islands as well, viewers in those islands were able to know Alarcón as well.

While in Puerto Rico, Alarcón met actress Claribel Medina, and the two soon fell in love with each other, beginning a relationship that was both seen with respect and disdain by Puerto Rican television viewers, some of which had problems accepting the fact that Alarcón was 36 at the time while Medina had come out of her teenage period just a few years before. The couple began making the covers of Estrellita, Teve Guía, Vea, Artistas and other Puerto Rican entertainment publications. The couple got married in 1985.

Alarcón and Medina continued working on various Puerto Rican television projects, which required for Alarcón to become a full-time resident of Puerto Rico. Meanwhile, Alarcón became known around his wife's country for his constant praising of his new home country on the local media. But the Puerto Rican telenovela industry disappeared after 1989, and the Alarcón-Medina couple, apparently forced by work shortage, decided to move to Argentina.

Back in Argentina, Alarcón semi-retired, acting in a small number of soap operas during the first half of the 1990s. Medina became a celebrity there as well, and the couple had two daughters. They were viewed by many in the Argentine and Puerto Rican media as one of show business' strongest couples, but, eventually, they divorced, ending their relationship on friendly terms.

Alarcón continues acting, doing theatre plays in Buenos Aires.

== See also ==
- List of Argentines
