= Ángela Meyer =

Puerto Rican actress, comedian and producer (born 1947)

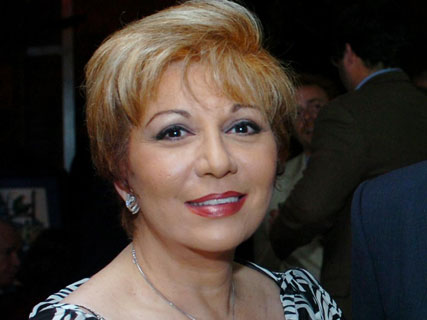
- Born: Ángela del Carmen Maurano Debén; 2 August 1947 (age 79); Santurce, San Juan, Puerto Rico
- Occupations: Actress, comedian, television producer, politician, former magician
- Family: Mario Maurano (father), Margot Debén (mother)

Ángela del Carmen Maurano Debén (born August 2, 1947), better known as Ángela Meyer, is a Puerto Rican actress, comedian, producer of television and theatrical works, and politician. Meyer is the founder and/or co-founder of various entertainment production companies. Among the production companies which have been associated with Meyer are Meca Productions which produced theater and television productions and Meyer de Jesus Productions which produced soap operas. Currently, she serves as a member of the Municipal Legislature of San Juan, the capital of Puerto Rico.

== Early years ==
Meyer was born as Ángela del Carmen Maurano Debén in Santurce, San Juan, Puerto Rico. Her mother, Margot Debén, was a Puerto Rican actress, comedian and magician (known as "La Princesa Nanglín") of Spanish descent, and her father, Mario Maurano, was a Brazilian-Argentine musician of Italian descent. Meyer was 18 months old when her parents divorced, and moved to Colombia with her mother to live with her uncle Ricardo Debén Jr., a magician known as "Richardine II". She was raised by her uncle and considered him her father. She made her debut on the stage before she was two years old in one of her uncle's presentations. Her mother remarried and returned to Puerto Rico leaving her daughter behind in her uncle's care. She continued to perform with her uncle in South America until 1968 when she returned to the island to live with her mother and stepfather. In Puerto Rico, she received her secondary education.

== Television debut ==
In 1973, Meyer traveled throughout Europe and the Middle East performing with her uncle. In 1968 she returned to the island, where her comic talent was recognized by Puerto Rican comedian José Miguel Agrelot. He invited her to participate in his show Ja, ja, ji, ji, jo, jo con Agrelot and when Tommy Muñiz started his production of 'telenovelas' she became one of its young leading ladies. She adopted her first husband's surname, "Mayer", and changed to "Meyer" (he died in an airplane crash) which she was to use as her stagename. She also auditioned and was cast in minor roles in the soap operas Marcelo y Marcelino and Mujeres sin hombre (Women without men). Meyer's talent as an actress was soon recognized and she was cast in the lead roles of Tomiko, El Ultimo Adios (The Last Good-bye), Rebelde (Rebel) and Un Amante al rojo vivo (A red-hot lover).

== Soap operas ==
In the soap opera El hijo de Angela Maria (The son of Angela Maria), Meyer was cast (in blackface) in the role of "Chianita", a poor black country girl who, despite the fact that she never attended school, was a very wise person with a sense of humor. The character of Chianita was to change the life of Meyer forever. The character was so loved by the Puerto Rican public that Meyer continued to make public presentations in various television shows such as Luis Vigoreaux's El Show del Mediodia. As Chianita, Meyer recorded three albums, including "Chianita Gobernadora" in 1973, which sold over 100,000 copies. Some people even wanted Chianita to run for governor, becoming a part of Puerto Rican folklore. However, the black makeup she used provoked an allergy on Meyer's face and in 1984 Chianita made her last public appearance.

Meyer participated as actress and assistant producer in the soap operas Primera Fila (First Row) and El Regreso (The Return). Puerto Rican artists were beginning to face the dilemma of local television stations importing soap operas from Mexico and Venezuela which were more cost efficient. Meyer and her friend and fellow actress, Camille Carrión, founded Meca Productions with the idea of producing theater and television productions. Their first theater production was Casa de Mujeres (House of Women), which went on for 105 presentations. They also produced for Tele-Once the show Ellas al Mediodia and the soap operas La Isla (The Island), Ave de paso and Yara Prohibida.

== Meyer de Jesus Productions ==
In 1988, Meyer founded "Meyer de Jesus Productions" (de Jesus is her second husband's surname), after Meca Productions was dissolved. She joined Telemundo and produced three series based on historical events: Mission Cumplida (Mission Accomplished) based on the events which took place at the Cerro Maravilla, Gaviota de Esperanza based on the life of Sandra Zaiter and Hasta el fondo del dolor based on the life of Sylvia Rexach, portrayed by Sylvia's own daughter, Puerto Rican actress & singer, Sharon Riley and Adamari López, as Sharon. During this decade she became very active in theatrical presentations. One of her most acclaimed works was the monologue: Tengamos Sexo en Paz (Let's make love in peace). She served in the Department of Puerto Rican Culture for the city of San Juan (1995–96) and as advisor for cultural and educational events in 2000, for the city of Bayamón.

In 2004, Meyer produced Tres Noches tropicales y una vida de infierno (Three tropical nights and a life in hell), which was presented in Puerto Rico, Orlando, Florida and Washington, D.C. In November 2005, Meyer participated with Johnatan Dwayne in Calderón de la Barca's La dama duende, presented at the Warehouse Theater in Washington, D.C.

== Municipal Legislature of San Juan ==
In October 2020, the month before the 2020 Puerto Rican general election, Meyer announced her intent to run for the Municipal Legislature of San Juan as a member of the New Progressive Party. Her bid was successful and she currently serves on the municipality's legislature.

== See also ==
- List of Puerto Ricans
- History of women in Puerto Rico
