= Pucho Fernández =

Cuban-Puerto Rican comedian

- Born: Leopoldo Fernández II; September 2, 1927; La Habana, Cuba
- Died: July 29, 2008 (aged 80); Carolina, Puerto Rico
- Other name: Pucho
- Notable work: Pepón/Superpan on El Barrio Cuatro Calles

Comedy career
- Medium: Stand-up, television

Leopoldo "Pucho" Fernández II (September 2, 1927 – July 29, 2008) was a Cuban-Puerto Rican comedian. He was the son of veteran Cuban comedian Leopoldo Fernández, known as Tres Patines.

== Biography ==
Fernández was born on September 2, 1927, in La Habana, Cuba. He started working in the theater in Cuba when he was only 13 years old doing several minor jobs behind the curtains. However, he quickly started performing with his father in his show La Tremenda Corte.

In 1954, he came to Puerto Rico and was quickly hired as floor coordinator for Telemundo due to his knowledge of both English and Spanish. He was also the technical coordinator of El caso de la mujer asesinadita, one of the first Puerto Rican telenovelas. He also worked with producers Henry Lafont, Gaspar Pumarejo, Luis Vigoreaux, Marta Silva, and Fernando Hidalgo. Later on, he started performing comedy sketches in El Show del Mediodía at WAPA-TV.

One of Fernández' more famous roles was in El Barrio Cuatro Calles, where he played the role of Pepón, one of the owners of two bakeries located one in front of the other and both competing for customers and sales. Later on, the comedy took another route where Fernández' character became "Superpan", a superhero spoof like Chespirito's El Chapulín Colorado (Mexico), which airs on opponent television channel in Puerto Rico, WKAQ-TV.

In the late 1980s, Fernández worked in El Cuartel de la Risa, another sitcom that took place in a police station, starring Carmen Dominicci, Rafael José, and Antonio Sánchez "El Gangster" at WSTE-DT. Other characters he was known for were Machito Pichón, Poncito, Cabo Blanco, and 20/20 (a Latin version of Mr. Magoo). Later, he collaborated in shows like Con Lo Que Cuenta Este País and intervened in some of Héctor Marcano's shows. Leopoldo Fernández last movie appearance was in 2003 in the film Latin Comedy: Una Comedia de Derecha para un Publico de Izquierda, where he co-starred with comedian, producer, writer, actress and director Janet Alvarez Gonzalez.

Fernández was also a stand-up comedian, screenwriter, and director. In his late years, he retired and dedicated himself to writing. He lived at a retirement home for a few years.

Fernández died on July 29, 2008, at the University of Puerto Rico Hospital in Carolina, Puerto Rico. He died of pulmonar emphysema because of his cigarette addiction. He had five children from two different marriages.
