= Vicky Hernández (producer) =

Puerto Rican actress and producer (1937-2020)

Vicky Hernandez (27 November 1937- 28 July 2020) was a Puerto Rican radio and television actress, producer and screenwriter.

== Early life ==
Hernandez grew up in Mayaguez, Puerto Rico.

== Career ==
She was signed by Columbia Pictures, a company for which she produced many Spanish language films. She was casting director for the Hollywood productions Che!, Woody Allen's Bananas, The Delta Factor and Stop!.

She wrote telenovelas, films, mini-series and sitcoms, including the film Life of Sin, and the telenovelas Los dedos de la mano, Al son del amor, La Jibarita and El amor nuestro de cada dia .

Hernandez was also a mini-series producer beginning with Las Divorciadas 1 (The Divorced Women, Part 1), televised on WAPA-TV, channel 4 in Puerto Rico.

Her production Color de Piel (Skin Color) was shown on Puerto Rican television station Super Siete and dealt with racism in Puerto Rican society, with Rafael Jose and Nydia Caro starring as a mixed-race couple.

In the 1990s Hernandez produced the sitcom El Cuartel de la Risa, a parody of the American crime show, Miami Vice.

== Retirement and death ==
Hernandez retired to a home in Hato Rey, Puerto Rico (in San Juan).

She died on 28 July, 2020, at the age of 82, following an accidental fall at home. Her body was found inside a bathroom in her house by 911 emergency personnel who had gone to do a welfare check on her after neighbors called the emergency telephone system.

Among those who expressed sadness at her death were Edgardo Huertas, Amneris Morales, Carlos Esteban Fonseca, Rene Monclova, and Marisol Calero.

== Religious beliefs ==
Hernandez was a Christian.

== See also ==
- List of Puerto Ricans
