= El meneo de la mañana =

Puerto Rico morning radio show

El meneo de la mañana, commonly known as El Meneo, (transl. The morning shake-up), is a morning radio show that began on Puerto Rico's west coast at a station then known as Cosmos 94. Many of the island's top radio performers began their careers there.

Among the most popular radio talents to have participated in this morning show were Antonio Sánchez (El Gangster), José Vallenilla (Funky Joe), Luis Antonio Shanom (Shanom), the DJs known as Marcos Del Valle (Dr Love), Red Shadow and Frankie Jay. Also appearing were Raulito Carbonell, Víctor Pagán and Gilbert Merle, and Erick Williams in the early stages.

El Meneo later was taken to WCMN-FM (Delta 107.3 FM, known as [Toca De To' 102.3 FM by Shanom where he hooked up with Santos Rodriguez (Dusty) and later with his former radio partner Gilbert Merle. This team of Shanom and Gilbert Merle established a few records that still hold to this day and gained recognition internationally. At WCMN El Meneo became the first truly interactive electronic radio show.

The show became the first ever to be broadcast outside of the island and to the U.S. mainland. El Meneo ran until 2004. It was Puerto Rico's longest running modern morning show and has been credited with having established the formula for Latin morning radio. Many if not all the DJs that formed part of this show are still some of the most recognized radio talents on the island.
