= Daniela Droz =

Puerto Rican actress and singer (born 1977)

- Birth name: Yesenia Droz Serrano
- Born: August 16, 1977 (age 48)
- Origin: Carolina, Puerto Rico
- Genres: Merengue
- Occupations: Singer; actress; television host
- Years active: 1987–present
- Labels: EMI Latin

Daniela Droz (born August 16, 1977) is a Puerto Rican actress, singer, and television host.

== Early years ==
Daniela [Yesenia Droz Serrano] started her acting career during childhood. Her stage debut took place in 1987, at age 10, in the San Juan production of the musical play Annie at Santurce Performing Arts Center. The Spanish-language production was produced by Benito Mateo, and also featured Nilka Desiree as "Annie", Kate Garrity as "Miss Hannigan", Luis Antonio Cosme as "Oliver Warbucks", and Claribel Medina as "Grace", among other noted performers. In 1988, she won the first prize award in 'Miss Maja Infantil' of Puerto Rico. Shortly after, she performed for several seasons, in a television comedy serial called: Maripili, opposite Puerto Rican leading lady Alfonsina Molinari, broadcast by WLUZ-TV, as well as various supporting roles in several sitcoms, such as Cuqui, and Carmelo y Punto, (Carmelo and Period), broadcast by WAPA-TV.

Daniela Droz lived in Laguna Gardens in her early years, while studying at Carvin High School in Carolina, Puerto Rico.

== Singing career ==
As the years came about, Daniela Droz became a young woman and her interests inclined to the music business, even though she had an alternate career as a fashion model. She became part of a merengue vocal group, studied communications at college, and after several attempts to fulfill her dreams of becoming a singer, in 1999, at age 22, she was signed by the EMI Latin recording label, and recorded her first album called: Cosas de Mujeres (Women talk), in the merengue genre. By then, Daniela was also known by the cognomen: La Dama de Hierro, (The Iron Lady). This surname is also the title of her first video clip, & her first hit single, composed by Marco Antonio Solís. The second hit single was Debo contar hasta diez,(I must count to ten), and her opposite leading man in the video clip was Cuban–Mexican actor Francisco Gattorno. Droz toured in Dominican Republic, and was the guest star of the television variety show Sábados de Corporán, in which she sang a duet with Dominican merengue singer, Kinito Mendez. After touring for a while throughout the Caribbean, she returns to Puerto Rico, and performed as the guest star of Mexican singer Alejandro Fernández's concerts at the Santurce Performing Arts Center.

In 2000, Daniela was acknowledged as 'The best young artist of the year' at the Paoli Awards, in San Juan, Puerto Rico. In the same year she participated along with Robert Avellanet in the play "The Sleeping beauty". Later on she participated in the especial show for "Vamos a encascarnos" with the Puerto Rican comedian Johnny Ray.

In 2008, Droz was recorded a song duet the Puerto Rican singer Osvaldo "Junny" Ramos, named "En una Cuerda Floja", in bachata, that song is planned to be in the next album of Daniela like a featuring.

== Acting career ==
As the year 2000 came about, she performed the leading role, on the stage production: La Bella Durmiente (Sleeping Beauty), alongside Gladys Rodríguez, and Lou Briel, among others, and opposite leading man, Robert Avellanet, again at Santurce Performing Arts Center. In 2001, she played "Sandy" in Grease, the musical, performed in English at the Arena Pier 10 show spot, opposite leading man Charlie Masso.

In 2004, she portrayed 'Elena', the leading lady of the Puerto Rican musical play: El Bombón de Elena, (Helen's Sweet), at Santurce Performing Arts Center, alongside Choco Orta and Andy Montañez, among others.

In 2006, she played opposite leading lady Karla Monroig in the Telemundo soap opera: Dueña y Señora. Her performance was acknowledged by the critics, as the villain of the telenovela. At the end of this year, she played "Sheila" in the well-received Puerto Rican production of the musical play A Chorus Line, staged at Caguas Performing Arts Center, alongside Marian Pabón & Braulio Castillo, hijo.

== Career as host ==
Daniela Droz has been the host of various television specials, and daily shows as Anda Pa'l Cará, and Objetivo Fama for several seasons. In 2007, she joined Antonio Sánchez "El Gangster" and "Funky Joe" as co-host of the daily radio show El Bayú de la Mañana on SalSoul. In January 2008, she joined them again on their new radio show, El Circo de La Mega. She also started co-hosting Sánchez television program No te Duermas.

== See also ==
- List of Puerto Ricans
- Dueña y Señora
