= Edgardo Huertas =

Puerto Rican singer and show host (1959–2024)

- Born: Edgardo Luis Huertas Feliciano; 24 September 1959; San Juan, Puerto Rico
- Died: 6 July 2024 (aged 64)
- Other name: Luis Feliciano
- Citizenship: Puerto Rico
- Occupations: singer, show host and actor
- Spouse: Maria Elena Concepcion

Edgardo Luis Huertas Feliciano (September 24, 1959 – July 6, 2024) was a Puerto Rican singer, show host and actor. He was known for his participation in various television shows, both in his native country Puerto Rico and in South America.

== Early life ==
Huertas was born in Santurce in San Juan, Puerto Rico. His first work as an entertainer came at age 11, on a show, "Los Payasos de la Tele", hosted by famous Spanish clowns "Gaby, Fofó and Miliki".

A multifaceted artist, Huertas appeared in "La Tribuna del Arte", a television show akin to the United States "America's Got Talent", and he earned a certificate as a singer, at the age of 15 in 1974. By this era also, young Huertas had demonstrated interest in song writing, and took photography and guitar playing as a hobby, in addition to taking radio show hosting classes.

His first big break came when he was invited by Ruth Fernandez to participate in her weekly television show "Del Brazo con Ruth" ("By Ruth's Arm"), which gave him celebrity in Puerto Rico. Soon, Huertas was co-hosting other shows with the likes of Carmita Jimenez and of Myrta Silva, among others.

In 1978, Huertas acted in a theatrical play named "Desconcierto" alongside legendary Puerto Rican comedienne Awilda Carbia. A year later, Huertas joined "Nuestro Teatro", acting in such plays as "Puerto Rico Fua!", which was a Carlos Ferrari production, and in which he acted alongside Luis Oliva and Junior Alvarez, among others.

== International success ==
In 1980, Paquito Cordero took Huertas to the United States, where he acted in his own show on the American northeast. Returning to Puerto Rico, Cordero and Huertas took their show to every city in the island. Huertas soon flew to Venezuela to participate in the 414th anniversary of the establishment of the city of Caracas, on a show named "Canto a Caracas" ("Singing to Caracas"). After flying back to Puerto Rico for a brief return, he participated in the "Festival de la Voz y la Cancion de Puerto Rico". Huertas placed fourth with his song, "Cancion Para Nosotros Dos" ("Song For Us Two").

Huertas and Iris Chacon then participated at the "Feria de Guayaquil" in Guayaquil, marking Huertas' debut as an entertainer in Ecuador. Huertas proceeded with a tour that included stops in the Dominican Republic, New York City and Panama.

Huertas represented Puerto Rico in the OTI Festival 1983 with the song "Navegaré" written by Lou Briel. Soon after, Huertas released his first musical album, titled "Dicelo a El" ("Tell Him That"). The album was followed by an offer from Venezuela to participate there as a television show host. He signed with Radio Caracas Television, where he hosted Fantastico and Estudio 30. In 1984, Huertas participated at that year's Miss Peru contest.

== Return to Puerto Rico ==
Having participated as a show host in Venezuela, Huertas returned to Puerto Rico and was hired by Tele Luz to host "La Feria del 7" alongside Maria Falcon and Georgina Borri. Huertas then returned to acting, participating in a play named "Jardin de Otono" ("Garden of the Fall"), alongside Cuban-Puerto Rican actress Ofelia D'Acosta.

Concurrent with that play, Huertas started hosting a television show, on Tele Luz, named "Edgardo Huertas.....Entre Amigos" ("Edgardo Huertas....Among Friends"), a talk show in which he interviewed multiple celebrities, including Mexican female pop girl group Flans, Veronica Castro, Argentine singer Maria Marta Serra Lima, Venezuelan actress Maria Conchita Alonso, Yolandita Monge, Chucho Avellanet, Argentine singer Laureano Brizuela, Mexican actors Salvador Pineda and Fernando Allende and others.

Huertas became Tele-Luz's director of promotions and public relations assistant, but an offer by Tele-Once to rejoin with Awilda Carbia, this time as co-host of her talk-show, "Soy Awilda" ("I an Awilda") lured him away. Huertas lasted there until another offer came, this time from WIPR-TV, where he worked mostly as a producer and also as a television historian.

== Later life and death ==
Huertas became a Puerto Rican television historian. He had a YouTube channel (EHuertas2007) where he showed older Puerto Rican television telecasts.

Huertas was married to Maria Elena Concepcion. The couple had a daughter, Amber Charlotte Huertas. He died on 6 July 2024, at the age of 64.

== See also ==
- List of Puerto Ricans
