= Melwin Cedeño =

Puerto Rican actor, dancer and comedian

- Born: Ponce, Puerto Rico
- Occupations: Actor; comedian; host; dancer
- Spouse: Phaedra Michalzik
- Children: 3

Melwin Cedeño (born in Ponce) is a Puerto Rican actor, comedian, host, and dancer. Cedeño is better known for his comedic performance as Chevy.

== Early years and studies ==
Melwin Cedeño was raised in Santa Isabel, Puerto Rico. His parents are Noel Cedeño and Lilina Irizarry. During childhood, he enjoyed making people laugh and admitted he was frequently "kicked out of school for making jokes in the classroom". Cedeño began to pursue pre-med studies at the Pontifical Catholic University of Puerto Rico in Ponce. However, he dropped out, and moved to study Drama at the University of Puerto Rico in Rio Piedras.

== Career ==
While studying, Cedeño joined a local merengue orchestra called Los Nenes de Puerto Rico. His partners in the orchestra later became members of the popular group Límite 21. He also joined the university theatre group working in several plays like La Celestina and Bodas de Sangre. Cedeño also debuted in television shows in dramatic roles in soap operas such as Alejandra, Karina Montaner, and Apartamento de Solteras . He achieved recognition for his dramatic role as a young drug addict in the telenovela Andrea.

At the end of the 1980s, Cedeño started working as a comedian in popular shows like Show del Mediodía and El Kiosko Budweiser. It was during this time that his character of Chevy was born. According to him, he had played a Nuyorican character in the play Tres hombres y un bébe, which prompted actress Yasmín Mejías to invite him to participate in one segment of a Luisito Vigoreaux show called Cafetería la 15. "They were looking for a 'son' for the character of Georgina Borri ... Luis didn't want me to play 'Chevy', but one day he wasn't at work, I put on the glasses and the handkerchief... the place was about to fall down."

The popularity of the character spawned a daily show titled Con Lo Que Cuenta Este País, which debuted in 1991. It was broadcast by Telemundo Puerto Rico and produced by Hector Marcano. The show remained among the top shows in audience ratings for several years until its cancelation in 1993.

After that, Cedeño hosted the comedy game show Alto Voltaje, also produced by Marcano in Telemundo, but the show was canceled after just three months. After the end of the series, Cedeño decided to retire briefly from public life. He moved to the United States exploring offers from Telemundo and Univision. Eventually, he returned to Puerto Rico and continued working in theater and with brief comedic appearances in shows like Eso Vale.

In the late 1990s, Cedeño made a film titled Chevy... Episodio I, along with producer Gabriel Suau, marked the come-back of his popular character. As a result of the response to the film, Cedeño received an offer to host a new show for kids titled Pégate con Chevy. The show debuted in 2000, and received the acknowledgment of Puerto Rican children's audiences. However, in 2002, the show was canceled despite its favorable reviews.

Cedeño still works regularly in television and theatre, and his character of Chevy remains popular among Puerto Ricans. He is currently a co-host in the show Pégate al Mediodía, along with Angelique Burgos, Jaime Mayol, and Natalia Rivera. Cedeño was initially brought in as a guest host but was made permanent when Mayol left to work on another show.

== Personal life ==
Melwin is currently married to former model and actress Phaedra Michalzik. They have two children together: Xander and Ackerly. Melwin has an adult son, Melwin Ahmed, from a previous relationship.

== See also ==
- List of Puerto Ricans
