= César Abreu =

Puerto Rican singer and dancer (born 1978)

César Armando Abreu Mercado (born April 10, 1977) is a Puerto Rican dancer, singer and actor. Abreu first rose to fame as a television actor in Puerto Rico and, later, internationally, as a member of boy band Menudo. As a dancer, he has performed at the MET in New York City.

He debuted as an actor in the 1986 Canal 4 children's comedy series, "Que Angelitos", alongside Shalim Ortiz, among others.

Abreu, who first identified as gay in his early teens, replaced Angelo Garcia in Menudo; he was himself later replaced in the band by the first non-Puerto Rican Menudo member, Adrian Olivares. Abreu was in Menudo for a short time before the band almost disbanded due to a drug scandal involving two of their members at Miami International Airport. Abreu had left the band before the scandal took place. He claimed during an interview with CBS News that he did not feel safe in the band because, according to him, while he kept his sexuality a secret, he was bullied while in Menudo. Abreu's family helped get him out of the band.

In 2022, Abreu spoke about his experiences as a member of Menudo in a Warner Bros mini-series titled "Menudo: Forever Young".

== Dancer ==
Abreu left Puerto Rico and settled in the United States, first in Florida, later in Pennsylvania and then in New York, obtaining an undergraduate degree in the University of the Arts in Philadelphia and then an MFA in dance at the New York University. Abreu has commented that he kept in contact with two former Menudo members who were his contemporaries at the band, namely Sergio Gonzalez (Blass) and Ruben Gomez.

Abreu joined the American Ballet Theatre at the Metropolitan Opera House (Lincoln Center) in New York City as a dancer in 2006 and has performed there since. He performs as a ballet dancer.

== Personal life ==
Abreu resides in Washington Heights, New York. In addition to being a professional dancer, he has recently worked as a producer and film maker.

== See also ==
- List of Puerto Ricans
- List of American Ballet Theater dancers
