= Videoteces =

Videoteces was the Spanish version of the famous North American TV Show "America's Funniest Videos". It was produced for Telemundo of Puerto Rico by Executive Producer Hector Marcano, Producer-Writer Jackie Torres, and Producer-Writer José Vallenilla. The show aired on 1993 and was among the top ten shows in ratings for its entire run. It had guest hosts in almost every show, the most frequent being Luisa de los Rios.

As for the meaning of the title, it's a cross between "Video" and "Idioteces" which is a rough latin Spanish version of the word "Idiocies" referring to someone doing something considered stupid or idiotic.

Jackie TorresHector Marcano WKAQ-TV
