= Georgina Borri =

Puerto Rican actress and playwright (born 1954)

Rosa Maria Georgina de Lourdes Borri Diaz, better known as Georgina Borri (born 30 August 1954 in Salinas, Puerto Rico) is a Puerto Rican television, theater and film actress and playwright. She is best known for her participation in such television shows as "El Show de Chucho Avellanet" ("Chucho Avellanet's show") and "Los Ramos Gamma".

== Biography ==
Born to mother Georgina Diaz (whom her father decided to name her after) in the southern Puerto Rico city of Salinas, which is near Ponce, Borri and her family moved north to the north-central city of Caguas when she was a young child.. In Caguas, Borri wanted to become a beauty queen but she changed her goals when she first saw Iris Chacon perform; Chacon inspired Borri to dream of becoming a vedette dancer instead. Borri took piano lessons and dance classes and was part of the drama club at the high school. Sne graduated from the University of Puerto Rico, in Río Piedras, where she studied Humanities with a concentration in Drama.

Borri began taking piano musical lessons and became a member of an acting club at high school. Borri then graduated from the University of Puerto Rico, Rio Piedras campus, with a degree in humanities and drama. Myrna Casas and Dean Zayas were among her teachers at the university. At the UPR, she studied Garcia Lorca, Chekhov, Lope de Vega and Brecht, among others.

=== Career ===
In 1975, at age 20 or 21, Borri debuted on Puerto Rican television, when canal 6, the Puerto Rican government's public channel, hired her to act on a telenovela adaptation of the famous novel, "Marianela". Further celebrity arrived when WKAQ-TV, canal 2, hired her to participate on the comedy sketches of well-known Puerto Rican singer Chucho Avellanet's show, "El Show de Chucho", where she worked from 1980 to 1990. The fact she worked at canal 2 notwithstanding, she also worked at canal 2's main rival, canal 4 and canal 7 (first at canal 7 and then at canal 4), on the television show "Los Rayos Gamma", acting alongside Jacobo Morales, Sunshine Logrono, Silverio Perez and Horacio Olivo. She also hosted a television show named "Al Día" on canal 7, from 1988 to 1990.

At the same time, Borri was active on the theatrical community, on plays such as "Un Tranvia Llamado Deseo" (Tennessee Williams's "A Streetcar named Desire"), Pablo Cabrera's "La Historia de Pedro Navaja" ("Pedro Navaja's Story"), Albee's "Quien le Teme a Virginia Woolf?" ("Who's Afraid of Virginia Woolf?"), "Se Casa mi Amante" ("My Lover Gets Married") and others.

Continuing her television acting career, Borri was involved in canal 4's "Cafetería la 15" ("15th Corner Cafeteria") from 1990 to 1991. During 1993, she joined canal 2's major comedy hit, "Con Lo Que Cuenta Este País" ("What This Country Counts On"), where she played Margot.

Borri also acted in the 2007 Puerto Rican film, "Maldeamores", alongside Luis Guzman and Miguel Ángel Álvarez.

In 2012, the movie "Broche de Oro" ("Gold Brooch") was released. The film, loosely translated as "Grand Closing", made history becoming the longest running Puerto Rican film of all times; it ran for two months in Puerto Rican cinemas.

In 2017, Borri acted alongside Dominican-Puerto Rican Charytin and Noelia Cresspo in a prequel film titled, "Broche de Oro:Comienzos". ("Gold Brooch:The Beginning").

In 2021, Borri participated in an online theatrical presentation named "Piano Bar". She also acted in "El Cuartito" during that year. "El Cuartito" ("The Room") is a movie about what takes place at an immigtration room at Luis Munoz Marin International Airport in San Juan, and in it, she shares credits with Puerto Rican-Argentine actress Claribel Medina.

In 2024, Borri was one of several guests at a Telemundo Puerto Rico special, which was hosted by Raymond Arrieta, to commemorate the 70 years of television in Puerto Rico.

==== Producing ====
She also launched a career as an events and musical producer, with the promotion of "Nardós y Azucenas: Juegos Infantiles Tradicionales" ("Tuberoses and Lillies: Children's Traditional Games") and the album "Canciones Para Juguar" ("Songs to Play Along To"), both geared towards children.

She also produced a major hit show for canal 11, the midday show "Ellas al Mediodia" ("Women at Midday"), which was co-hosted by, among others, Camille Carrion, Angela Meyer, Margot Deben and Carmen Belen Richardson.

Borri has also worked as a playwright.

== Legal problems ==
During 2017, Borri was involved in a hit and run allegations case, her accuser was her neighbor, a lady who said Borri hit her with her car. Borri lost $20,000 dollars defending herself.

== Oscar Lopez Rivera protest ==
During 2013, Borri was among several celebrities who went into a mock jail cell for half an hour to protest the jailing of Puerto Rican independence advocate Oscar Lopez Rivera. Others who joined in the protest included former Puerto Rican governor Anibal Acevedo Vila, Norma Burgos of the pro-statehood party and activist Tito Kayak. Borri protested at an activity in her adopted hometown of Caguas.

== Honors ==
The 2023 Puerto Rican Film Festival, in which the latesrt film in which Borri participated, "La Pecera" ("The Fish Tank", she played "Cuca" while acting alongside Magali Carrasquillo), was initially released, was dedicated to her.

== See also ==
- List of Puerto Ricans
