= Johnny Ray (comedian) =

American actor, comedian and dancer

Johnny Ray Rodríguez
- Born: Johnny Ray Rodríguez; Bronx, New York, United States
- Other names: Johnny Ray
- Occupation(s): Actor, comedian, dancer
- Years active: 1995 – present

Johnny Ray Rodríguez —better known simply as Johnny Ray— is an actor, comedian and dancer of Puerto Rican descent. Ray is known for his character of Petraca in the comedy Minga y Petraca and for his imitation of Iris Chacón.

== Career ==
From sitcoms to soap operas, plays, musicals, CD recordings, standup comedy, dance and film, this native New Yorker from the Bronx is a major force in the entertainment industry of Puerto Rico. As a performer in San Juan, Telemundo acted as his first big arena to showcase his many talents. Starring in TV shows such as: "No Te Duermas", (Don't Fall Asleep) "Esto No Es Un Show", (This Is Not A Show) and "Minga Y Petraca", has placed Johnny Ray high up the ranks with fans and critics alike.

With his award-winning TV show, "Esto No Es Un Show", his skills as a producer, director, writer and choreographer, were always put to the test as he turned out a new episode week after week. He wrote, directed and starred in the made-for-TV movie, "Vamo' a Escascararnos" which aired on Telemundo and can now be seen on YouTube.

As a comedian and entertainer, Johnny Ray recently had critics and audiences raving about his 7 sold-out performances for his amazing stage show, 'Esto Si Es Un Show', (This IS a Show) at the prestigious 'Center for the Performing Arts Luis A. Ferré' in San Juan, Puerto Rico. August of this year, 2016, marks his return to this important venue with 'Esto Sí Es Un Show II'.

In LA his acting credits include, 'Crazy Ex-Girlfriend', 'Weeds', 'Disney's Princess Protection Program', 'Journey of a Female Comic', 'The Hot Tamales' and 'Locos y Contentos'. He's also appeared in commercials for both Spanish and English markets.

Johnny Ray produced and starred in the film, "The Three Bilinguals" and is about to direct a 'horror thriller' he wrote for the big screen called, 'The Thing Inside'.

In his spare time, Johnny works for Universal Studios and is also a certified personal fitness trainer.

Rodriguez also worked as a special make-up artist on the movie, "Vampiros".

== Filmography ==
Actor
Year	Title	Role	Notes
1992–2005	Minga y Petraca	Petraca	Main role
1995	No te duermas	Various roles	
2004	Vampiros	Padre (Priest)	
2005	"Guilty or Innocent?"	Det. Ray Suarez	1 episode
2005	My Backyard Was A Mountain	Pablo	Credited as Johnny Ray
2005	El Sueño del regreso	Brian Kelly	Also known as La Guagua Aérea 2 in Puerto Rico
2008	The Art of Being Straight	Paul	
2009	Border Line	Spanish Reporter	
2009	Barbara Wood - Karibisches Geheimnis	Michael Fallon	
2009	Princess Protection Program	General Magnus Kane	Disney Channel Original Movie
