= Con Lo Que Cuenta Este País =

Puerto Rican comedy sitcom

- Starring: Melwin Cedeño; Raúl Carbonell; Wilfred Morales; Miguel Morales; Felicidad Morales; Yamaris Latorre; Ildia Santiago; Pucho Fernández; Raquel Montero; William Gracia; Georgina Borri; Victor Santiago; Cuco Sandoval; Vanessa Rosario; Alba Raquel Barros; Ángel Javier; René López; Joaquín Jarque; Various Guest Stars
- Country of origin: Puerto Rico

Production
- Running time: 30 mins

Original release
- Network: Telemundo Puerto Rico
- Release: February 2, 1991 – 1993

Con Lo Que Cuenta Este País (in English, What The Country's Counting On) was a popular Puerto Rican comedy sitcom that became a hit based on the popularity of its main character named Chevy (played by Melwin Cedeño).

The show began airing on February 2, 1991 on Telemundo of Puerto Rico, and lasted until 1993. It remained on the top spots during its run. Some of the characters gained so much popularity that they would reprise their roles on other shows.

== Show history ==
Comedian Melwin Cedeño started playing his character Chevy in the late 80s. The character was so popular among teens that producers Hector Marcano, Jackie Torres, Jose Vallenilla and Rafael Quijano, presented a new sitcom to Telemundo of Puerto Rico. The show was added to Telemundo's programming in February 1991.

The show was quickly received and cherished by Puerto Rican audiences and occupied the top places in ratings. It remained very popular until its cancellation in 1993. Cedeño has continued to perform as Chevy on other programs and activities, and some of the actors involved have reprised their roles in other shows (see El Gran Bejuco).

== Show synopsis ==
Chevy was a Nuyorican teenager that upon returning to Puerto Rico started working at restaurants. He was hired by "Don Vale" (Pucho Fernández, son of the international star Tres Patines) at the restaurant "El Gandongo Express" as a waiter. "Don Vale" had a beautiful daughter named "Beba" (Felicidad Morales) who instantly fell in love with "Chevy" (Melwin Cedeño).

The restaurant was located in an alley corner, and Chevy would always arrive in his flamboyant Volkswagen Beetle listening to loud music. After getting down, he would perform some dance stunt, and then go to work.

The restaurant and the street in front became a meeting place for Chevy and his friends. Anything could happen on that street: carnivals, fights, and even a pool party.

The restaurant would also draw some bullies that would try to pick fights with Chevy. The leader of this gang was "Cholón" (slang for a big head), performed by Wilfred Morales, and "Bejuco" (slang for skinny), performed by Miguel Morales. Most of the time, Chevy would beat them up and kick them out of the restaurant.

All of these characters would also create sub-stories with their relatives, friends, or love interests. After some time, Pucho Fernández left the show, opening the door to characters like Paca (Raquel Montero) and Polo (William Gracia) to join the cast as helping Beba (Felicidad Morales) to manage the business until it was later on leased to Margot (Georgina Borri). She was the last manager of the restaurant on the last season of the show.

Since the first episode, the show had four open credits sequences, six wrestling/boxing episodes and a mini-serial named "Chevy, ¿culpable o inocente?" that lasted 10 episodes.

Aside of its obvious slapstick humor, the show sometimes tried to address common social situations present in Puerto Rico.

== Cast ==
=== Lead characters ===
- Melwin Cedeño as Chevy, a Nuyorican that works as a waiter at "El Gandongo Express" restaurant. He drives a brightly colored Volkswagen Beetle and enjoys rap music. He is in love with a girl named Beba. He is smart but tends to have a short temper and is always getting in fights with bullies and even clients.
- Pucho Fernández as Don Vale, the first manager of "El Gandongo Express", and the father of Chevy's on-and-off girlfriend "Beba".
- Raúl Carbonell as Israel, the owner of the newsstand next to "El Gandongo Express" and one of Chevy's friends.
- Felicidad Morales as Beba, the daughter of "Don Vale" and Chevy's on-and-off girlfriend. She usually corresponds him, but their relationship is usually portrayed in a childish way. She is nice but has a tough attitude to people that doesn't treat her right.
- Yamaris Latorre as Sissi, one of Beba's best friends. She enjoys rock music and usually dresses in jeans and loose, wild hair. On the first years of the show, she was portrayed as being an airhead or dimwitted, but on later years, her character took more importance. She happened to fall in love with Chevy, but was never able to tell him.
- Ildia Santiago as Deborah, Beba's other best friend. She enjoys exercising and usually wears sportswear.
- Wilfred Morales as Cholón, the leader of the bully gang. He is a fat, bald man with a scarred face. He is very strong, but not very clever, and Chevy always takes advantage of this.
- Miguel Morales as Bejuco, one of Cholon's friend. As opposed to him, he is thin and weak. He is always wearing a shirt with the Puerto Rican flag and a baseball cap put on backwards. He tends to be one of the most obnoxious members of the gang. He would go inside the restaurant and ask Chevy to tell him everything in the menu only to end up asking for a glass of water. Chevy would then beat him up, and kick him out. Bejuco went on to have his own show (see El Gran Bejuco)

=== Supporting characters ===
- Raquel Montero as Paca, Don Vale's sister and briefly the manager of "El Gandongo Express" (when Pucho Fernandez left the show). Then, her character stayed as the next door neighbor and romantic interest of a security guard named "Polo".
- William Gracia as Polo, Beba's uncle (her mother's brother). He came to help her with the management of "El Gandongo Express" just before Paca's arrival. He was like a handyman taking care of several jobs (shoemaker, cooker) finally becoming a security guard. He was the object of Paca's affection, but his heart belonged to Margot (Chevy's mother).
- Georgina Borri as Margot, Chevy's mother. She became the owner of "El Gandongo Express" during the last season.
- Víctor Santiago as Mostro, another member of Cholon's gang. He sports a flat top haircut with colored stripes and would always go on asking everybody for two dollars. His famous line was: "El hombre brega". Like Cholón, he is not very clever.
- Cuco Sandoval as Cuco, the last member of Cholon's gang. He was added when the production team needed a greater gang for a wrestling match episode and his character stayed. He is the dumbest of the gang, almost never talked, and is usually spaced out and sleeping.

=== Recurring characters ===
Several characters made cameo or special appearances on the show.

- "Volcan" (Angel Javier) He was the son of the original Gandongo Express owner who rent it to "Don Vale". At first he was like a "troublemaker" but then the character changed to be like a Daddy's Boy (always saying: "Papi dice" {"Daddy says"}) and great friend of Chevy and the gang.
- "René" (René López) an orphan kid who play along the streets. He was very smart and always get the way to earn money the easy way.
- "Don Goyo" (Joaquin Jarque) an old man with bad temper. He only appeared on several episodes.
- "Mimi" (Alba Raquel Barros) a mature woman with a silly laugh. She was Don Vale's love interest.
- "Tito" (Wilfred Morales) he was a kid who lived with his mom across the street. He made silly statements and always was accusing everyone with his mom. His famous line was: "¡Se lo voy a decir a mami!" ("I'm going tell mom").
- "Gregory" (Edwin Francisco), Volcan's cousin. He was cocky and a total bully. He was attracted to Beba.
- "Pupe" (Raúl Carbonell), a bum, he always carried a rum bottle. He once was a famous trumpeter and used his talent on several episodes.
- "Sessi" (Yamaris Latorre) Sissi's twin sister. She only appeared in several episodes trying to win Chevy's love just to annoy Beba.
- "Chola" (Vanessa Rosario) Cholon's younger sister, quite overweight, and in love with Chevy.
