= El Cuartel de la Risa =

Puerto Rican comedy show

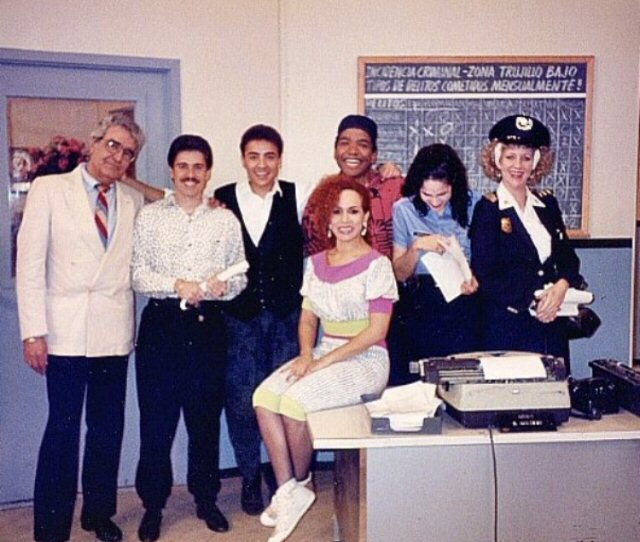
- Starring: Antonio Sánchez "El Gangster"; Rafael José; Pucho Fernández; Carmen Dominicci; Kate Garrity; Lourdes Chacón
- Country of origin: Puerto Rico

Production
- Running time: 30 minutes

Original release
- Network: WSTE

El Cuartel de la Risa was a Puerto Rican comedy show broadcast on WSTE. It was one of the most successful comedy shows during its run. Th show was produced by Puerto Rican actress, writer and producer Vicky Hernandez.

The show revolved around what happened in a generic police station in the fictional town of Trujillo Bajo, Puerto Rico. El Gangster and Rafael José personified two detectives (a la Miami Vice), Carmen Dominicci and Kate Garrity were two female officers, while Pucho Fernández was an old and dumb officer. The Puerto Rican Vedette Lourdes Chacón had a recurring role as the reporter "Clarita" and appeared in several episodes. The show lasted 7 years on the air (3 with the show and five on reruns). This was Supersiete's last original sitcom to air on the channel before being bought to Teleonce. This comedy was created and produced by Vicky Hernandez.

El Cuartel de la Risa was written by Kate Garrity, and at a later date, Pucho Fernandez also contributed. Garrity was part of the directing team which also included Walter Rodriguez and Gurin Belgoderes. There were several guest appearances, including Machuchal, Tita Guerrero and many others. Two actors played District Attorneys, one being Jaime Ruiz Escobar, whose character was also a love interest to Garrity's character. Garrity cast herself as "La Capitana" in charge of the Cuartel which she later noted was a big help given the level of laughter, fun and jokes that were part of taping the program.
