= El Bayú de la Mañana =

Puerto Rican morning radio show

- Genre: Morning radio show
- Running time: 4 hours
- Country of origin: Puerto Rico
- Home station: SalSoul
- Starring: El Gangster; Funky Joe
- Original release: May 6, 1994 – December, 2007
- Website: http://www.elbayu.com

El Bayú de la Mañana (or simply El Bayú) was a popular Puerto Rican morning radio show that aired on Cadena SalSoul . "Bayú" loosely means "party" or "mingling". The show started airing on May 6, 1994, and remained popular throughout its run. It started at 6:00 am and ended at 10:00 am.

The show was hosted by Antonio Sanchez (El Gangster) and José Vallenilla (Funky Joe). Daniela Droz later joined them in the hosting duties.

The shows featured several characters, most performed by Sanchez, plus interviews with celebrities or the audience. It also featured a gossip section and discussions about social and political issues.

On July 31, 2007, the show longtime hosts were replaced due to some differences. Sánchez alleged in an interview that one of the main reasons was the lack of modern technical equipment in the radio station which they had been asking for years. They were replaced by veteran producer and host Luisito Vigoreaux, merengue singer Giselle, and Jorge Pabón (known as "El Molusco"). However, Pabón quit shortly after to join another radio station. Vigoreaux and Giselle continued to host with various guests until the show was substituted in January 2008 by a new show, El Trabuco, hosted by Agustín Rosario, Yan Ruíz, and Sonya Cortés.

Sánchez and Vallenilla have gone on to host a new show called El Circo de La Mega in another station.
