= Jackie Torres =

Puerto Rican actress, writer, director and producer

Jackie Torres is a Puerto Rican actress, writer, director and producer who gained notoriety while producing the top shows Marcano...El Show and Con lo que cuenta este pais in her native Puerto Rico and La Hora Lunatica in Los Angeles California, all for the Telemundo Television Network. Her move to Los Angeles introduced her to the cinema world. She directed the urban films The Price of the American Dream & East LA King for Laguna Productions and Crossing Frontiers for her own company Jakmar Entertainment. As an actress she has acted in over 20 films and TV series including Domino: Battle of the Bones, After Words, Black Monday, Bosch, ER, The District, Miss Cast Away and the Island Girls, Blood Relatives, and El Güero Estrada. She obtained a Bachelor’s Degree in Communications at the University of Maryland, College Park. After that, she got a Master’s Degree from the University of Puerto Rico.

== Career ==
=== Puerto Rico ===
In the summer of 1982, Barker's, once a giant of the department stores in USA, wanted to avoid closing its doors in Puerto Rico and launched a media campaign that covered TV, radio and press entitled: "La Nueva Era de Barkers" (Barkers New Era). This campaign put then teenager actress, "Jackie Torres", alongside TV personality "Pedro Zervigón". "Barkers" eventually closed its doors in Puerto Rico but this massive advertising campaign made "Torres" a very recognizable face everywhere and reaffirmed her decision to get a bachelor's degree in Radio, Television & Film from the "University of Maryland at College Park" in the United States. She then returned to Puerto Rico to get a master's degree in Public Communications from the "University of Puerto Rico at Rio Piedras". While still getting her master's degree, she worked for "Cedme Televisión", the University of Puerto Rico's provider of programming for "WIPR Channel 6", the channel of the government of Puerto Rico. She produced TV special "Estampas Navideñas" for WIPR. A year later, on 1989, "Torres" moved to another local channel in Puerto Rico, channel 13. There, she became one of Puerto Rico's first VJs (Video Jockey – term popularized by MTV) when she hosted "TVS" (Talent, Video & Sound) where she interviewed the top rock bands of Puerto Rico. 6 months later, in 1990, Telemundo, the number one TV station of Puerto Rico at the time, hired her. In Telemundo, "Torres" produced, wrote & acted in top rated variety show Marcano... el show which soon became the first show from Puerto Rico to be aired in the United States through the Telemundo Network. Several Latin stars, including Ricky Martin and "Olga Tañon", made their first solo appearance in "Marcano...El Show". Radio personalities "Héctor Marcano" & "Funky Joe", along a live band and actors "Wilfred Morales" & "Jackie Torres" welcomed top international stars "Vanilla Ice", "José Feliciano", "Ricardo Montaner", "Juan Luis Guerra y su 4–40", "Yuri", "Pandora", "Daniela Romo", "Carlos Vives", "José José", "Ednita Nazario", "Menudo" and many others. In 1991, while still producing "Marcano…El Show," "Jackie Torres" became the producer & played a recurring role in another TV show: Con Lo Que Cuenta Este País. The daily half-hour sitcom, also aired in Telemundo, won the top spot among young audiences and the second spot in national ratings, only preceded by the other TV show produced by "Jackie Torres", "Marcano…El Show". In 1991, while still producing "Marcano…El Show" & "Con lo que cuenta este país", Torres produced another show for Telemundo: "Videoteces" (Puerto Rico’s version of America’s funniest videos). "Videoteces", immediately took a spot among the top ten rated shows in Puerto Rico but the show was short-lived because of the high costs of producing it. It was up to "Torres" to produce a cost-efficient concept and in the summer of 1993 the top rated TV documentaries "Pequeños… Grandes Lecciones" (Little ones…Big lessons) a series of documentaries about kids who have done exceptional deeds, was written, directed & produced by "Jackie Torres". Many other TV specials & live events, including "De plaza en plaza con Coca-Cola" (from town to town with Coca-Cola) were also produced by Torres. By 1994, Torres was set on reaching a wider audience and headed to New York to complete the acting program of "Herbert Berghoff Studios". A year later, in 1995, she moved to Los Angeles, California to produce another TV show for the Telemundo Network.

=== Hispanic TV / USA ===
In 1995, Telemundo wanted to repeat the success of Torres' previous variety show and hired her to produce & write "La Hora Lunática" (The Crazy Hour) in "Hollywood". The daily, one hour, live TV show aired from "Raleigh Studios", was the first show of the "Telemundo Network" to win in its time slot over its strongest competitor, "Univisión". The show featured the talents of "Humberto Luna", "Mario Ramírez" ("El Comodín"), "Hugo Armando" & "Jackie Torres" who welcomed "Tito Puente", "Celia Cruz", "Marc Anthony", "Julio Iglesias", "Antonio Aguilar", "Vicky Carr" & many more international stars. In 1997, Torres took a break from producing and acting on Hispanic TV and transitioned to the world of cinema.

=== Mexico ===
Jackie Torres spent the remainder of the 1990s playing leading roles in Mexican films: "El Güero Estrada," "Clave Secreta," "La Paloma y el Gavilán,""Acábame de Matar," & "Cuatro Meses de Libertad," which included Mexican actors"Julio Alemán", "Eric del Castillo", "Valentín Trujillo", "Sebastián Ligarde", "Manuel Ojeda", "Mario Ramírez" & directors "Christian González", "Gilberto de Anda" & "Jesus Fragoso".

=== Hollywood ===
Torres started the new millennium acting, producing & directing her first independent film in English: The Price of the American Dream which not only became the most profitable film of its production company, "Laguna Productions" but it was also used by several universities in the USA to study the Mexican-American reality. Jackie also played several supporting roles in bigger studio productions, including ER with Noah Wyle, The District with Craig T. Nelson, and Miss Castaway with Michael Jackson. In 2004, Torres directed and co-wrote her second film, East LA King. In the mid 2000s Jackie produced and acted in other films but she devoted more time to theater plays produced by her own company, Jakmar Entertainment; the most prominent were Los Latinos son de puro Vacilón, La Pasión de Jesucristo, Las Aventuras de Cri-Cri and Don Juan Tenorio Cómico. On 2007, Torres directed her third film, Crossing Frontiers, which became an official selection of the Chicano Film Festival in México. On 2010, while still participating in many theater productions, Torres returned to hosting, with live show "Domingos Espectaculares" on Sundays at LA’s historic landmark "Placita Olvera"."Jackie" has continued performing and hosting live events such as "5 de Mayo" and multiple fund raising events. "Jackie Torres"’ acting credits include feature films Domino: Battle of the Bones with David Arquette & Snoop Dogg After Words with "Marcia Gay Harden" TV Series Black Monday for Showtime, Bosch for Amazon Prime, Torchwood: Miracle Day for Starz & recurring appearances on Mega TV Series "Dante Night Show" and Discovery's Blood Relatives as well as top video game Grand Theft Auto V as a voice actress.

== See also ==
- Torchwood: Miracle Day
- Marcano... el show
- Con Lo Que Cuenta Este País
- Videoteces
- Pequeños... Grandes Lecciones
