= Qué Angelitos =

Puerto Rican children's television show

Qué Angelitos, alternatively known as Los Angelitos, was a Puerto Rican children's television show of the 1980s. The program first aired on 3 February 1986. It was shown on canal 4, and produced by Elín Ortiz. The program was notable for topping "El Chavo del Ocho", a Mexican children's comedy show that had established itself as a favorite in Puerto Rico and the rest of Latin America and which was transmitted in Puerto Rico by Canal 2, off the top of the charts for the hour slot in which both shows competed at. Qué Angelitos aired Monday through Friday starting at 4:30pm via WAPA-TV's Channel 4 for five years. In a survey that included over one-hundred shows, programs and newscasts in Puerto Rico in the 1980s, Qué Angelitos secured the tenth spot based on popularity rankings in 1986.

== Cast ==
The show starred many actors, including the established Cuban wrestler and actor "Tigre Perez", Shalim Ortiz beginning at age 6, and a very young, future Menudo member and Metropolitan Opera dancer, César Abreu. Producer Elin Ortiz's wife, Shalim Ortiz's mother Charytin Goyco, also appeared sometimes. Another young actor, Alexis Rosado, played "El Cheche".

== Music ==
Qué Angelitos recorded and released two soundtrack albums, the first of which was named "Qué Angelitos" and included the singles "Computadora" and "Un Milagro de Amor" ("A Miracle of Love"), and the second, which was named "Una Nueva Era de Los Angelitos" ("A New Era of Little Angels").

== See also ==
- Chiquititas
