= Gilbert Merle =

Puerto Rican radio announcer

Gilbert Merle is a Puerto Rican radio announcer who reached the height of his popularity in the "El meneo de la mañana" morning show. Gilbert graduated from the Interamerican University of Puerto Rico In San Germán, Puerto Rico (US). As Shanom's long standing radio partner, Gilbert Merle became a radio icon in the media. (Shanom and Gilbert are household names to the westerners of the island.) Gilbert Merle was part of the first team to have aired a morning show from Puerto Rico to the US mainland.
