= Angelique Burgos =

Puerto Rican model

Angelique Burgos "La Burbu"
- Born: Angelique Burgos; December 17, 1978 (age 47); Fajardo, Puerto Rico
- Other name: La Burbu
- Occupations: Model, Entrepreneur and Broadcaster

Angelique Burgos (also known as La Burbu, born December 17, 1978) is a broadcaster and actress. She was a model for the show No te Duermas ("Don't Fall Asleep") a few years back, and was the winner of the reality show "Las Estrellas Bailan" in Pa' Que Te Lo Goces on a Puerto Rico television show. She is currently the host of a TV show called 'Pégate al Mediodía on Wapa TV and 'El Despelote' on the radio with Roque Gallart in La Nueva 94 (SBS) both shows are aired Monday to Friday.

She released a book, Un grito de silencio in 2009, which describes her experience of being raped as a young child, in an effort to help other victims of abuse.

She is married to basketball player Elías Larry Ayuso. They have two kids together, Saílh Elías also known as Red Red was born on August 22, 2011, and Kokoh Mar who was born on September 28, 2017.

Angelique Burgos ventured into entrepreneurship in 2008 with the launch of her clothing line, "Angelique by Burbu," which targets women of all ages and sizes and is distributed exclusively through Walmart stores in Puerto Rico.

In 2016, Angelique Burgos was named Businesswoman of the Year by Walmart Puerto Rico, recognizing her entrepreneurial achievements in launching and managing her fashion and merchandise lines.

== See also ==
- Taína
