= My Backyard Was a Mountain =

2005 short film

My Backyard Was a Mountain is a 2005 multiple award winning AFI short film by Puerto Rican American writer and director Adam Schlachter and producer Austin Wakefield.

Schlachter first filmed a black-and-white version of the movie in 2004 called Palmarejo to secure financing for his project. He was the recipient of multiple grants, including The Caucus Foundation's Gold Circle Award and Hispanic Scholarship Fund's HSF / McNamara Family Creative Arts Project Grant. It has won many awards, including Best Short or Student Film at the 2006 Imagen Awards. Much of the cast of the earlier version was invited to reprise their roles for My Backyard Was a Mountain. The movie premiered on October 23, 2005 at the Arclight Hollywood Film Festival and is currently available for download on iTunes.

== Plot ==
The movie is set in the early 1960s and deals with Adan's family needing to relocate from rural Puerto Rico to New York City. Since he cannot take it with him, he has to find a new home for his pet goat in a hurry. The movie also deals with Adan's saying good-bye to his first love, Denise.

== Cast ==
Cast
Andrew Aguilar	Adan
Leily Sanchez	Denise
Johnny Ray Rodriguez	Pablo
Ada Luz Pla	Lilliam
Sheila Korsi	Tiaca
Enrique Renaldo	Francisco
Ivan Hernandez	Joselito
Sarah Nanko	Neggy
Luis Lassen	The Gentleman
Doralicia	The Lady
Eli Vargas	Boy
Wendeline Beltran	Girl
Tayna Rivera	Chica
