= Marcano... el show =

Puerto Rican television series

Marcano... El Show is a television show that aired from 1990 to 1995 in Puerto Rico. It featured interviews, comedy sketches and music. The show aired in the United States in 1992 in the midnight slot on Telemundo. It was produced by Jackie Torres. The executive producer was Héctor Marcano. Hector Marcano co-hosted the show with Jose Vallenilla (Funky Joe).

Marcano...El Show was Puerto Rico's number one show for three consecutive years. Notable guests included Marc Anthony, Vanilla Ice, Juan Luis Guerra, Ricardo Montaner, José José, Hector Camacho and Ricky Martin, who debuted as a solo artist there.

== Controversy ==
"Marcano... El Show" was controversial. It frequently copied elements from similar shows on American networks. The set was an almost exact replica of The Arsenio Hall Show, including elements such as the dog pound and a female keyboard player. The host was introduced the same way as Hall ("Damas y Caballeros... Hector Marcano"). Its comedy sketches were taken from popular 90's shows that included: In Living Color, David Letterman, Saturday Night Live, Totally Hidden Video/Candid Camera, and Hall's show.
