= Alex Soto =

Puerto Rican comedian, actor, and drag queen

Alex Soto Hernández (July 29, 1965 – April 9, 2015) was a Puerto Rican actor, comedian and drag queen, who was well known for his transvestite characterizations. Soto was a native of San Juan, where he worked on several theatrical productions.

== Biography ==
Soto was born in San Juan, Puerto Rico, the son of Julio Soto Cosme and Carmen Hernández Coriano. He had two sisters, Magali and Ivette, and a brother, Denis. Since a very young age, he found work as an actor in Puerto Rican theatre, and during the 2000s, he gained popular exposure on the famed television show, Minga y Petraca, playing "Tomasa", a neighborhood lady.

In 2002, Soto portrayed a drag queen in a theater play named Vidas de Herejes, which was a hit play. He reprised the role when the play returned to the theaters during 2004 and 2010.

== Health problems ==
Soto suffered from diabetes and obesity. In 2012, he had his right leg amputated. He flew from Puerto Rico to Boston, Massachusetts in late 2014, both to be near his sister and to be hospitalized there for diabetes and for an infection on his amputated leg.

Soto suffered a fatal heart attack at the Baystate Medical Center in Springfield, Massachusetts on the evening of April 9, 2015.

== See also ==
- Antonio Pantojas
- Dreuxilla Divine
- Lady Catiria
- List of Puerto Ricans
