= Raulito Carbonell =

Puerto Rican actor (born 1951)

- Born: 24 October 1951 (age 74); Santurce, San Juan, Puerto Rico
- Occupations: actor, comedian, singer, lawyer

Raul Carbonell Huo (better known as Raulito Carbonell and also known as Raulito Carbonell, Jr., born October 24, 1951) is a Puerto Rican actor, comedian, salsa singer, published author and lawyer. He has played several famous characters on Puerto Rican television, most notably "Israel", "El Veterano" and "Papo Swing", and released one salsa album in 1995.

== Biography ==
Carbonell is the son of Raul Carbonell, Sr., who himself was a poet and voice actor. Raul Sr. used to work on Puerto Rican radionovelas and was well known by the Puerto Rican public.

Carbonell, Jr. began his entertainment career at the young age of eight, at first acting on telenovelas and drama films. Around 1975, Carbonell, Jr. began participating on Puerto Rican television comedies.

During the early 80's, Carbonell, Jr. acted alongside Jacobo Morales, playing "El Veterano, Erminio Dominguez", a Vietnam War veteran, on a WAPA-TV variety show's ("El Show del Mediodia") daily comedy sketch, "La Tiendita".

During the late 1980s, Carbonell. Jr., returned to WAPA-TV's canal 4's mid-day television variety show, "El Show Del Mediodia", this time playing what would become his most popular character, "Papo Swing", a streetwise, salsa loving, loudmouth comedic character that required Carbonell, Jr to wear a monster-like mask and perform difficult dancing moves on camera.

Carbonell, Jr. moved to WAPA's rival channel, Telemundo Puerto Rico, in 1991 to participate in a show named Con Lo Que Cuenta Este País, in which he played "Israel", an effeminate character who was the show's main character's (Chevy, el Ponzoñú, played by Melwin Cedeño) friend.

During 2019, Carbonell starred on a theatrical play named "Raulito Carbonell y Los Mas Buscados", where he played some of his better known characters. He toured parts of the United States, including Orlando, Florida, Rochester, New York and Houston, Texas,

=== Singing career ===
Carbonell, Jr. debuted as a salsa singer on Rubby Haddock's 1981 LP record, "De Regreso" as a background vocals singer. He released an album in 1995, titled "El Cantante".

=== Filmography ===
Carbonell, Jr. has been featured in several films, including:

- La Gran Fiesta (1986, as "M.C.")
- Nueba Yol (1995, as "Fellito")
- Nueba Yol 3:Bajo la Nueva Ley (1997, as "Fellito")
- El Cuento Inolvidable de la Abuela (2002, TV movie, he was credited as "Raulito Carbonelle")
- Kamaleon (2003)
- Revolucion en el Infierno (2004, TV movie, as "Andres Velez")
- La Caja de Problemas (2004, TV movie, as "Sr. Mac Gregor")
- Desamores (2004, as "Valdo Frias")
- Cayo (2005, as "Willie")
- Lavoe: The Untold Story (2011, as Hector Lavoe)
- Lio de Faldas (2012)
- A Trouble in Dollars (2014, as "Jose M.")
- Cows Wearing Glasses (2014)
- Mal Dia (2015, short film)
- Los Domirriquenos (2015, as "Tommy")
- Vasos de Papel (2016, as "Hector")
- Dos Policias en Apuros (2016, as "Smith")
- La Llamarada (2016, TV movie)
- Los Domirriquenos 2 (2019, as "Tommy")

=== Law career ===
Carbonell, Jr. is the leader of the Carbonell Immigration Law Group, which has its offices in Miami, Florida. He represents immigrants to the United States in the court of law and specializes in United States immigration laws.

=== Published work ===
Carbonell published "Latitud 18 Norte, Rescate en el Caribe", a book about a rescue in the Caribbean Sea, during 2022.

== See also ==
- List of Puerto Ricans
