= Minga y Petraca =

Puerto Rican TV Show by Antonio "El Gangster" Sanchez

- Also known as: Minga y Tomasa
- Created by: Antonio Sanchez "El Gangster"
- Starring: Antonio Sanchez "El Gangster"; Johnny Ray Rodríguez; Alex Soto
- Country of origin: Puerto Rico

Production
- Running time: 30 minutes (including commercials)

Original release
- Network: WKAQ-TV
- Release: 1992 – 2005

Minga y Petraca (later known as Minga y Tomasa) is a television show, produced in Puerto Rico by Antonio "El Gangster" Sanchez from 1992 to early 2005 on Telemundo Puerto Rico, channel 2.

Sanchez and actor Johnny Ray Rodríguez played Minga and Petraca (respectively), two middle aged, mustached "ladies" who dedicate themselves to reading such magazines as Vea, Teve Guia and other popular Puerto Rican gossip magazines. They commented on the stories published, making fun of the articles. After reading magazine articles, they would get into comedic situations with their friends, husbands and families. Their husbands have never actually been shown on the show, only their voices are heard. Minga and Petraca are from the Santurce area of San Juan.

Minga y Petraca reached such popularity in Puerto Rico that there was even a CD released with the two characters as main stars. The song Estoy Escriquillá!! (loosely translated into I'm tired) was a big hit during Christmas of 1993 on Puerto Rico's radio.

Ray moved to the United States and with that, he took his character of Petraca. Sanchez decided that "the show must go on", and changed the show's name to Minga y Tomasa. He hired a new actor, Alex Soto, to play Minga's new friend, Tomasa. Ray flies to Puerto Rico on and off to tape shows, and his character Petraca is now a visitor from the United States to Minga.

In March 2005, the show was cancelled because Telemundo wanted to open a new telenovela spot at 9:00 p.m., so axed all sitcoms and programs in that time slot, only leaving Sanchez's No Te Duermas, as a daily show.

In January 2008, the Minga character got new life as part of a weekly No Te Duermas segment on Minga's Tokchou (Minga's Talk Show in Spanglish). In her segment, male guests dress as females while female guests dress as males.

On February 27, 2011, a Minga y Petraca reunion show aired on Telemundo Puerto Rico.

== See also ==
- Antonio Sanchez (Puerto Rican host)
