= Shalim Ortiz =

Puerto Rican actor

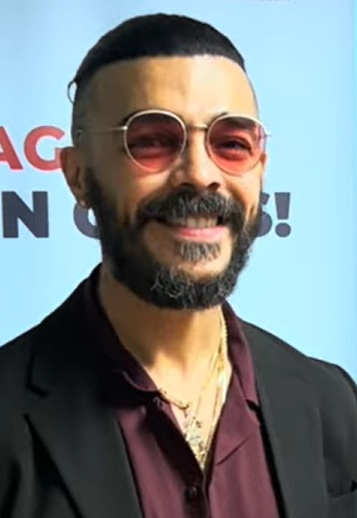
- Ortiz in 2024
- Born: February 26, 1979 (age 47); San Juan, Puerto Rico
- Occupations: Actor; singer
- Years active: 1994–present
- Spouse: Leslie Ann Machado (m. 2008; div. 2017)
- Parents: Elin Ortiz (father); Charytín Goyco (mother)
- Musical career
- Instruments: Vocals; guitar

Shalim Ortiz (born February 26, 1979) is a Puerto Rican actor and singer.

== Personal life ==
Ortiz is the son of Dominican singer, actress, and host Charytín Goyco and Puerto Rican actor and comedian Elín Ortiz. Ortiz married Leslie Ann Machado in 2008. The couple welcomed a son in 2009 and later welcomed twins sons in 2016 before divorcing in 2017. Ortiz and Machado divorced in 2017 and Ortiz began dating actress Thanya López in 2018.

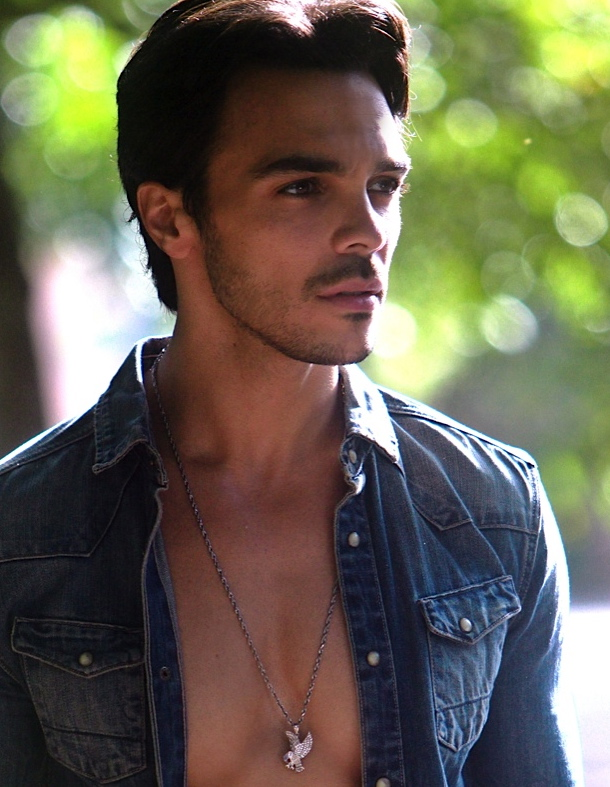
Shalim Ortiz in 2012

== Television ==
In 2007, Ortiz starred as Miguel in the romantic, web-only series "Engaged" and also portrayed Alejandro Herrera on Heroes. His character was killed in the penultimate episode of the second season. He guest starred in an episode of Cory in the House as Bahavian singer Nanoosh. He also is featured in the Hallmark Channel movie Expecting a Miracle, which premiered January 10, 2009.

He was also part of Maneater (2009 miniseries) for Lifetime (TV network) as Pablo.

In 2012, Shalim joined the cast of Una Maid en Manhattan for NBC-Telemundo as engineer Frank Varela who fought for the love of Marisa.

== Film ==
Recently he has been involved in a film project that also stars Robert Miano, Leo Fong and Raymond Forchion.

== Filmography ==
=== Film ===
Year	Title	Role	Notes
2007	Spin	Carlos	
2007	Yuniol	Yuniol	
2008	The Art of Travel	Carlos Bullet	
2008	The Winged Man	Winged Man	Short film
2008	Partigiano	Partisan 1	
2009	Gurdian	Wally	
2009	Touched	Jimmy	
2011	Jackie Goldberg: Private Dick	Jesus	
2012	Silver Case	Tuco	
2012	Tipo duro	Frank Vega	
2013	Reencarnación: Una historia de amor	Alejandro	
2013	5 Bravo	Rafael	
2014	Dame tus ojos	David	
2015	Silver Case: Director's Cut	Tuco	
2016	Loki 7	Alex Rivera	
2016	American Curious	Raúl	
2021	Women Is Losers	Carlos	
2026	Casa Grande	Leon Reyes	

=== Television roles ===
Year	Title	Role	Notes
1986	Que Angelitos	Shalim	Recurring role
2001	S Club 7 in Hollywood	Miguel Delgado	2 episodes
2002	Lizzie McGuire	Carlos	Episode: "El oro de Montezuma"
2002	Al salir de clase	Himself	Episode: "Errores del pasado"
2004	Ángel rebelde	Shalim	
2007	Cory in the House	Nanoosh	Episode: "No, No, Nanoosh"
2007	Heroes	Alejandro Herrera	7 episodes
2008	Wanna Be Me!	Desiderio Lopez	Television film
2008	30 Days 'Til I'm Famous	Guido	
2008	CSI: Miami	Mario Vega	Episode: "Cheating Death"
2009	Expecting a Miracle	Juan Salazar	Television film
2009	Cold Case	Gonzalo Luque	Episode: "Stealing Home"
2009	Maneater	Pablo Hernandez	2 episodes
2011	El octavo mandamiento	Iñaki Arriaga	
2011	Morir en Martes	Dr. Adrian Ortiz	2 episodes
2012	XY	José García Roble Jr.	7 episodes
2011–2012	Una Maid en Manhattan	Frank Varela	167 episodes
2013	Dama y obrero	José Manuel Correal	
2013	Magic City	Antonio Rivas	5 episodes
2016–2017	Señora Acero	Arturo Sánchez	Recurring role (seasons 3–4); 84 episodes
2016	Ballers	Manny	2 episodes
2017	La Piloto	Dean Simpson	Recurring role (season 1); 26 episodes
2017	Las Reinas	Lorenzo De La Reina	Episode: "Absolutely Miami"
2017	La Hermandad	Mubarak	Recurring role (season 2); 5 episodes
2018	Tres Milagros	Brayan	Recurring role (season 1); 8 episodes
2018	Rubirosa	Ramfis Trujillo	
2019	Grand Hotel	Mateo	Main role
2020	Power Book II: Ghost		Recurring role
2020–2021	All Rise	Joaquin Luna	Recurring role (season 2); 10 episodes
2025	NCIS	Fernando	Guest role (season 23, episode 1)
2026	Romeo Santos & Prince Royce: Lokita por mí		Musical clip

== Discography ==
- Shalim
- Cuarto sin Puerta

== See also ==
- List of people from the Dominican Republic
- List of Puerto Ricans
