= Antonio Sánchez (Puerto Rican host) =

Puerto Rican radio and television personality

- Born: Antonio Sánchez; January 1, 1961 (age 65); New York City, NY
- Other name: El Gangster
- Occupations: Host, producer and comedian

Antonio Sánchez (born January 1, 1961) is a Puerto Rican radio and television personality, show host and producer. Known for his humor, he is also known for his nickname, El Gangster. As of 2008, his television show, No te Duermas, had been on the air for 19 years.

== Biography ==
=== Early life ===
Antonio Sánchez was born in New York City to Antonio Sánchez Sr. and Zoraida Casiano. He was the oldest of four children. When he was 9 years old, his family returned to Puerto Rico, and settled in the town of Hormigueros, Puerto Rico.

=== Radio Host ===
Sánchez started studying at the Interamerican University of Puerto Rico in San Germán, and he began working as a disc jockey at college parties with his now partner Angél Santiago. He was also in the midst of the late 1970s CB Radio craze where he used the handle "Tony Toyota".

In 1979, while studying, he started working at a local station called Radio Disco. He was then called to work at Cosmos 94 in Mayagüez with two shows called La Hora del Rusheo (1981) and El Meneo (1982). He also worked for Salsa 63. It is during this time that he donned the name of "El Gangster". According to him, he is extremely shy, and his radio persona was a way to let go a more extroverted attitude.

In 1983, he was asked to work in San Juan, so Sánchez left his studies and moved to the capital. He started working at QBS AM Radio with El Pon de la Mañana with "Funky Joe", and later started working in El Gufeo Matutino at Z-93 with "Moonshadow".

In 1994, he returned to work with his friend, hosting El Bayú de la Mañana at SalSoul radio station. They remained together in the show from 1994 to 2007 when they were replaced due to differences with management. In January 2008, they started hosting a new show called El Circo de La Mega at 106.9 FM. www.elcirco.net

=== Television works ===
In 1985, Sánchez started working on several television shows like A Gozar (WAPA-TV), El pueblito Nius and El Show del mediodía. The next year, he hosted the game show Lo tomas o lo dejas.

In 1987, Sánchez and friend Hector Marcano were cast as co-hosts of television game show La Hora de Oro on Puerto Rico's Super Siete channel. The show enjoyed a successful run for two years in Puerto Rico, period in which Sanchez's face also became familiar to the Puerto Rican public. During this time, he also performed in comedies like El Cuartel de la Risa (1989) and Adultos Solteros (1990), both with Rafael José.

In 1989, Sánchez was approached by producer Gabriel Suau to intervene in a show called No te Duermas. Although originally the idea was to have another host while Sánchez performed comedic sketches, Sánchez presented Suau an idea he had about a television program, and he gave him the opportunity. In February 1990, No te Duermas debuted on Channel 7 (Super Siete). After a year of success, the show moved to Channel 2 (Telemundo) in October 1991. For two years, the show peaked at #1 on local TV popularity lists, and for the following years it remained among the Top 10.

In 1992, Sánchez also began production of Minga y Petraca, where he plays one of the main characters. The show was a spin-off of a sketch from No te Duermas, where two ladies (played by Sánchez and Johnny Ray) would constantly gossip on their balcony about local celebrities. In March 2005, the show was cancelled because Telemundo Puerto Rico wanted to open a new telenovela spot at 9:00pm, making all the sitcoms and programs at this spot to be axed, leaving only Sanchez's No Te Duermas as a daily show.

In 2008, after 18 years, Sánchez announced he would retire the show to take a break and dedicate himself to other ventures. The last show aired on December 30, 2008.

Late during the 2010s, Sanchez started playing a character named Fausto Punetier during the radio and television show El Circo. Punetier represents an effeminate fashion designer who nevertheless does have a girlfriend.

=== Other works ===
Sánchez also became a manager of other entertainers. Among the people he has managed is merengue singer, Giselle.

=== Personal life ===
Sanchez married Nelva Rodríguez on June 4, 1983, after meeting her in college. They have three children: Francheska, Gabriel, and Anaís. Sánchez has been known for rarely commenting about his personal life.

Sánchez enjoys fishing and is the owner of a Harley-Davidson motorcycle.

== See also ==
- No te Duermas
- List of talk show hosts
- WKAQ-TV
- El meneo de la mañana
- List of Puerto Ricans
