= No te duermas =

Puerto Rican television series

- Created by: Antonio Sánchez
- Presented by: Antonio Sánchez
- Starring: Antonio Sánchez; Lourdes Collazo (1990); Sandra Vanessa Mercado (1990); Jailene Cintrón (1991–1996); Yizette Cifredo (2003–2004); Laura Hernández (2005–2007); Daniela Droz (2008)
- Country of origin: Puerto Rico

Production
- Running time: 60 minutes (including commercials)

Original release
- Network: SuperSiete
- Release: February 1990 – October 1991
- Network: WKAQ-TV
- Release: October 1991 – December 30, 2008

No te duermas (Don't Fall Asleep) was a Spanish-language television program, a late-night talk and variety show from Puerto Rico. It started airing in February 1990 as a late night show with comedian Antonio Sánchez "El Gangster" in WSTE-TV SuperSiete. Later on, the show moved to Telemundo Puerto Rico, enjoying great success.

== History ==
The idea of the show came from two sources. Originally, producer Gabriel Suau approached Antonio Sánchez with the idea of a talk show called No te Duermas. Suau wanted to have Axel Anderson as host while Sánchez would intervene with comedy sketches, characters and interrupting the interviews. Sánchez, instead, presented Suau an idea he had for a show. Suau then decided to drop his original idea and gave Sánchez the opportunity to lead it.

In February 1990, the show debuted in Channel 7 (Super Siete) instantly peaking at #1 in local popularity charts. After a year, Telemundo made Suau an offer and the show moved in October 1991. The show continued to be #1 for two years, and stayed on the Top 10 for the following years.

In 2005, while negotiating their contract, Telemundo offered Sánchez the chance to do the program from Monday to Friday, and compete directly with Univision's Anda Pa'l Cara. Sánchez accepted, changing also the overall format of the show. In February 2008, the show changed to a Monday through Thursday format, with Esto Esta Kñon, a political discussion and satire show, aired on Friday. This show is produced by Antonio Sánchez himself.

Near the end of 2008, Sánchez announced he would retire the show after almost 19 years. During December 2008, the show featured interviews with people that contributed to the show's success during its history, and shows of old comedy sketches. The last show was aired on December 30, 2008.

Antonio Sánchez "El Gangster" returned with a live show called "No Te Duermas: Una noche más" August 31, 2019 at the Coliseo de Puerto Rico and included a live feed to a location in Orlando, Florida (to accommodate the many Puerto Ricans who have migrated there). The show hosted the same scenery, characters and humor that distinguished the television program, and then was aired on September 17, 2019, on WAPA TV.

== Hosts and models ==
Sánchez has been the host of the show for its duration. However, he has been accompanied during most of the show's history by a female co-host. Some of them have been:

- Lourdes Collazo (1990)
- Sandra Vanessa Mercado (1990)
- Jailene Cintrón (1991–1996)
- Yizette Cifredo (2003–2004)
- Laura Hernández (2005–2007)
- Daniela Droz (2008)

The show has also put models in the spotlight by being on a prime time show. Some of the most famous have been Taína, Glerysbeth, Maripily, La Burbu, Mara Cruz, and others.

== Show format ==
The show features interviews to artists, music performances, curious facts, and comedy sketches featuring mostly characters by Sánchez himself. The show was criticized in its beginnings for its raunchy style and general portrait of women. This, however, has helped the show to maintain a strong male following.

=== Guests ===
Some of the show's featured guests have included:

- Dayivet Aleman
- Noris Jofre
- Bad Bunny

== Comedy Characters ==
Here is a list of some of the comedy characters portrayed by Antonio Sánchez in his show:

- El poeta que todo lo compone (The poet who composes everything): a poet who always find his verses almost ending in obscene words but replaces them with another one.
- Lindín: an obese man (Sánchez in a suit) who finds himself immensely attractive.
- Kiko Jones: a spoof of Indiana Jones. His "adventures" are always intercut with scenes of real movies in a campy way to make it funnier.
- Super Moncho: a Puerto Rican version of Super Dave. A stunt man performing increasingly absurd stunts, before which he will always yell "Pelo power!!!" (he would then rip open his shirt and exposing chest hair made of magic marker and some times very little real hair) and ends up always failing. At the end he will always yells "Estoy vivooo!!!" (I'm alive!!!).
- Pedro Lambellagas (Pedro Scablicker): a news reporter with a lame voice and a unibrow. Most of his news reports are criticisms of the local government or funny takes on local news.
- Pepe Pirindingo: a taxi driver who's always faced with crazy situations.
- Pepín Galarza: a naive and innocent geek. Somehow women are attracted to him putting him in extremely sensual situations. At that point he would always ask to the screen "Gangster, ¿que hago?" (Gangster, what should I do?. After receiving a good advice from Sánchez, he would go and do some stupid thing.
- Dr. Selástraga: a promiscuous doctor who's always asking his female patients to get undressed.
- Minga: a gossiping woman who comments on celebrities and other everyday subjects. She would go on to have her own show (Minga y Petraca).
- Don Remigio: a horny old man who always pursues beautiful women and ends up getting hit. His sketches are usually featured in a silent movie style with fast-tracked editing and old music in the background.
- Tetron: a giant-breasted figure with flippers who came out of the shore of Puerto Rico's beaches and bathed young girls in milk.
- Cuco Pasurín: a reporter with a jewfro and a fish tie who uses clips from other interviews to answer his questions. Usually ending his interview with a woman answering that she loves "la morcilla" (the blood sausage).
