= Rafael José =

Puerto Rican singer and actor

- Born: Rafael José Díaz; April 22, 1955 (age 71); Manatí, Puerto Rico
- Occupations: Actor, singer, host

Rafael José Diaz (born April 22, 1955) is a Puerto Rican actor, singer and television host.

== Biography ==
=== Early life ===
Rafael was born in Manatí, Puerto Rico, where his father, a physician born in the Dominican Republic, was the medical director of the local hospital. His family eventually moved to Mayagüez in Western Puerto Rico where he grew up. While living in Mayagüez he sang and acted in various amateur radio and television broadcasts, as well as in high school talent shows. His reputation as a powerful singer followed him to San Juan, Puerto Rico, while attending medical school. His family supported his singing career on the condition that he finished the dentistry program at the University of Puerto Rico School of Dental Medicine. He interrupted his studies for close to eight years when his singing career took off, but eventually finished his degree and became a dentist (although he rarely practices his profession nowadays).

=== OTI Festival ===
In 1978, he was selected by Telemundo to represent Puerto Rico in the seventh edition of the OTI Festival, which was held in Santiago, Chile. His song entitled "Háblame" (Talk to me), which was warmly received by the audience and by the international jurors gave him the fourth place.

In 1980, he won the ninth edition of the Festival OTI, in Buenos Aires, Argentina, with his interpretation of the song Contigo Mujer, which scored 36 points in the event and became an instant hit all over the Puerto Rican radio. The song was composed by singer Ednita Nazario (Who had represented Puerto Rico in the same festival the previous year) and Laureano Brizuela. Another radio hit was "Yo Quiero Hacerte Olvidar", the theme song for the telenovela "Martha Llorens".

=== New projects ===
He soon began acting on television in various telenovelas and in 1983 became co-host of the Saturday night program A Millón, along with Héctor Marcano and Sonia Noemí on WAPA-TV. He proved to be a talented TV host and lasted there for various seasons. During this time, he and his then wife, actress Magali Carrasquillo, had a son, Juan Pablo.

In 1986, he joined Roberto Vigoreaux in hosting another WAPA-TV game show, Sabado En Grande, when A Millón was moved to Sunday nights. During this time, he also performed with Antonio Sánchez in the hit sitcoms El Cuartel de la Risa and Adultos Solteros. In the late 90s, he was hired as a television host by Univision in Miami, Florida.

José then became a recognizable face with Latino audiences in the United States with the movie showcase program Tu Pelicula. Later on he joined the morning show ¡Despierta América!, along with Fernando Arau, Ana María Canseco, Neyda Sandoval and fellow Puerto Rican Giselle Blondet. In 1998, Jose covered the 1998 Fifa World Cup as a commentator for Univision.

In 2005, he started hosting Univision-Puerto Rico's successful night show Anda Pa'l Cara. At present, he is a co-host of the night program "Que Noche" on WIPR-TV in San Juan.

In 2013 he starred in the Puerto Rican premiere of Jerry Herman's La Cage Aux Folles as Albin/Zaza, opening in August 2013 at the Luis A Ferré Performing Arts Center in San Juan.

In 2018, José joined WAPA as one of the show hosts and television reporters of variety show Lo sé todo where he remained until 2019 when he shifted to the station's daytime variety show !Viva La Tarde! alongside Tita Guerrero and Jaime Mayol where he currently (as of 2023) remains as host.

== See also ==
- List of people from the Dominican Republic
- List of Puerto Ricans

Preceded by Aguamarina with "Piel dormida"	Puerto Rico in the OTI Festival; 1978	Succeeded by Ednita Nazario with "Cadenas de fuego"
Preceded by Ednita Nazario with "Cadenas de fuego"	Puerto Rico in the OTI Festival; 1980	Succeeded by Glenn Monroig with "Mírame a los ojos"
Preceded by (Argentina) Daniel Riolobos with "Cuenta conmigo"	Winner of the OTI Festival 1980; 1980	Succeeded by (Spain) Francisco with "Latino"
