= Taína (model) =

Puerto Rican model

- Born: Noris Díaz Pérez; October 2, 1975 (age 51); Río Piedras, Puerto Rico
- Other name: La Taína
- Modeling information
- Height: 5 ft 2 in (157 cm)
- Hair color: Black
- Eye color: Brown

Noris Díaz Pérez (born October 2, 1975), also known as La Taína, is a Puerto Rican model and host. She appeared on the now defunct late-night show No te Duermas from 1996 to 2007. In addition to her work on television, she has appeared in numerous commercials and ads for beers and other products.

Taína was born in Río Piedras, Puerto Rico. She has produced eight calendars featuring photographs of her in various poses. She had brief roles, as a prostitute in the film Bad Boys II (along with fellow Puerto Rican Denise Quiñones), and in the Puerto Rican film Más allá del límite, both released in 2002.

In January 2006, Taína was hospitalized with severe headaches for what was believed to be a brain tumor. The diagnosis was later altered to encephalitis and she gradually recovered from the illness and returned to television.

On August 1, 2011, she announced via a press release that she is HIV positive.
