= Miss Perú 1984 =

- Date: May 19, 1984
- Presenters: Humberto Martínez Morosini, Cynthia Piedra & Silvia Maccera
- Venue: Coliseo Amauta
- Broadcaster: Panamericana Televisión
- Entrants: 24
- Winner: Fiorella Ferrari; Lima Region

The Miss Perú 1984 pageant was held on May 19, 1984. That year, 24 candidates were competing for the national crowns. The chosen winners represented Peru at the Miss Universe 1984 and Miss World 1984. The rest of the finalists would enter in different pageants.

== Placements ==
Final Results	Contestant
Miss Peru Universe 1984	Region Lima - Fiorella Ferrari Iglesias
Miss World Perú 1984
1st Runner-UpLa Libertad - Florencia Flores	San Borja - Karina Torres Saric
2nd Runner-Up	Miraflores - Janny Navarro
Top 8	Surco - Patricia Kuipers; Mala - Ana Sofía Novella; Distrito Capital – Alicia Tillit

== Special awards ==
- Best Regional Costume - Ucayali - Marlit Bartra
- Miss Congeniality - Lima - Patricia Cecchi

== Delegates ==
- Amazonas - Silvia Lazo de la Vega
- Áncash - Zita Pesagno
- Arequipa - Yolanda Cáceres
- Cuzco - Giovanna Venero
- Distrito Capital - Alicia Tillit
- Huancavelica - Jessica Abugattás
- Ica - Ada María Ubillus
- Junín - Maria Elena Pinillos
- La Libertad - Florencia Flores
- Lambayeque - Martha Wiese
- Mala - Ana Sofía Novella
- Miraflores - Janny Navarro
- Moquegua - Cecilia Chanove Collao
- Piura - Ana María Puigrefagut
- Region Lima - Fiorella Ferrari
- Rímac - Ana María Aedo Joya
- San Borja - Karina Torres Saric
- Lima - Patricia Cecchi
- Surco - Patricia Kuipers
- Tacna - Sussy Gálvez
- Trujillo - Cristina Loayza Guerra
- Tumbes - Norma Infantes
- Ucayali - Marlit Bartra

== Judges ==
- Carlos Gino Vásquez - Peruvian Basketball Player
- Rafael Puga - Peruvian Bullfighter
- Silvia Higueras - Miss Maja International 1983
- Victor Hugo Vieira - Soap Opera Actor
- Pedro García Miró - Peruvian shooter & Captain of the national Olympic Team
- Cesar Calvo De Araujo - Peruvian Writer, Poet & journalist
- Inés de Ronalds - Manager of Las Dunas Hotel
- Eduardo Bonilla - Manager of Creaciones Sheila
- Baruch Ivcher - Manager of Paraiso
- Fernando Gomberoff - Manager of Beauty Form
- Francesca Zaza - Miss Peru 1982
- Mario Cavagnaro - Creative Director of Panamericana Televisión

.
