= Adalberto Rodríguez =

Puerto Rican actor

- Born: January 22, 1934; Sabana Grande, Puerto Rico
- Died: April 16, 1995 (aged 61); Hato Rey, Puerto Rico
- Other name: Machuchal
- Education: University of Puerto Rico (BBA)
- Occupations: Actor; comedian
- Military career
- Allegiance: United States
- Branch: United States Army
- Service years: 1953–1955
- Rank: Private first class
- Conflicts: Korean War

Adalberto Rodríguez Torres (January 22, 1934 – April 16, 1995), better known as Machuchal, was a Puerto Rican actor and comedian.

Rodríguez was born in the town of Sabana Grande, in southwest Puerto Rico, to Luis Rodríguez Pérez and María Luisa Torres Vega. In his boyhood years he imitated animal sounds for his elementary school peers. His "Machuchal" stage name is that of the Sabana Grande barrio where he grew up. He enjoyed calling himself "El alcalde de Machuchal", (the Mayor of Machuchal). The joke not only prevailed, it also helped launch him into stardom.

At age 17 and following high school, (1951), Adalberto Rodríguez moved to Río Piedras to enter the University of Puerto Rico with a view to obtaining a bachelor's degree in business administration, and then, to pursue the career of attorney. Shortly after and at the same time, he worked as an announcer on radio station WIAC.

Machuchal was drafted to the military service in 1953 and served in the United States Army with the 82nd Airborne Division in Fort Bragg, North Carolina. He also fought in the Korean War. After his discharge in 1955 Rodríguez went back to Puerto Rico and resumed his studies earning a bachelor degree in business administration at UPR in 1957.

Rodríguez played the role of Puerto Rico's mountain man, known as Jíbaro. He would wear the typical Jíbaro straw hat and the farmer's typical shirt for many years on his daily appearances on Telemundo Puerto Rico's midday show, El Show de las 12.

Rodríguez also participated in La Taberna India, (The "India" Tavern), a show that was sponsored for many years by the Puerto Rican beer of the same name. When La Taberna India moved to WAPA-TV in 1985-having by then become "La Taberna Budweiser", Machuchal also moved to Telemundo Puerto Rico's fiercest rival.

Rodríguez once prompted Mexican comedian Cantinflas to compliment him, saying that nobody in the world made him laugh like Machuchal did. Machuchal also participated in some movies, including Machuchal En Nueva York and El Agente 0.

Rodríguez also worked alongside other Puerto Rican show business figures, such as Tommy Muñiz, José Miguel Agrelot, Elin Ortiz, Sonia Noemí, and Eddie Miró.

In November 17 2024, Adalberto Rodríguez was posthumously inducted to the Puerto Rico Veterans Hall of Fame.

== Filmography ==
Rodriguez participated in many movies, most of them Puerto Rican productions but also in Mexican-Puerto Rican co-productions. He often played "Machuchal" or versions of the "Machuchal" character in them.

- Lamento Borincano
- El Alcalde de Machuchal (1964, as Triburcio Perez)
- Los Expatriados (1964)
- Millonario a Go Go (1965, as "Machuchal")
- C.65 (1965, short film)
- Rosa, La Tequilera (1967, he played two roles, those of "Machuchal" and of Graziano)
- El Curandero del Pueblo (1968, as Machuchal)
- Machuchal, Agente O en New York (1970, as "Machuchal", this time a policeman)
- Poor But Honest (1973)
- Mulato (1974)
- Eva, ¿qué hace ese hombre en tu cama? (1975)

== Death ==
Adalberto Rodríguez died on April 16, 1995, in Hato Rey, Puerto Rico. He was buried at the Sabana Grande Masonic Cemetery in his hometown Sabana Grande, Puerto Rico. It's unknown the cause of Machuchal's passing.

== See also ==
- List of Puerto Ricans
- Sonia Noemí
