= Charytín Goyco =

Dominican singer, TV hostess and actress (born 1931)

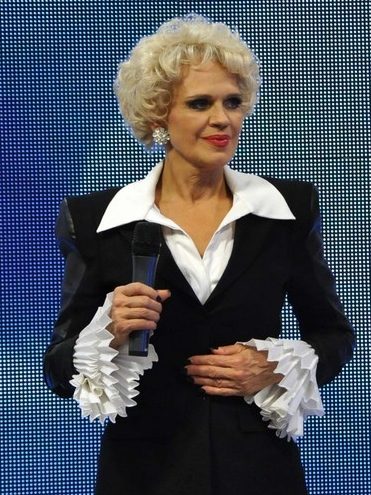
- Charytín in 2010
- Born: María del Rosario Goico Rodríguez; May 23, 1949 (age 77 years); Santa Lucía, El Seibo, Dominican Republic
- Occupations: Singer; comedian; television presenter; actress
- Years active: 1970's–present
- Spouse: Elín Ortiz (m. 1974; died 2016)
- Children: 3, including Shalim Ortiz
- Relatives: Freddy Beras-Goico (paternal cousin); José Enrique Arrarás (third cousin); María Celeste Arrarás (third cousin once removed)
- Website: Twitter: @CharytinOficial

María del Rosario Goico Rodríguez (Note: In this name that follows Hispanic American naming customs, the first or paternal surname is Goico and the second or maternal family name is Rodríguez.), better known in show business as Charytín Goyco or simply Charytín, is a Dominican singer, comedian, television hostess and actress.

== Early life ==
Born in Santa Lucía, El Seibo, to Salvador Goico Morel, a Dominican attorney of Russian, Serbian, Montenegrin, French, and Spanish ancestry, and María del Rosario Rodríguez Martínez, Spaniard attorney from Asturias who found herself exiled during the regime of Francisco Franco.

Her father was a grandchild of Genaro Alfredo Goico Cebollero and a great-grandchild of Justo Del Pilar Goico Cebollero, who were native to Añasco, Puerto Rico. They were the immediate direct descendants of Gerónimo Goicovich, a son of a Russian and a Serbian-Montenegrin who settled in Mayagüez, Puerto Rico from his native Montenegro in the late 1770s. Like Puerto Rican politician José Enrique Arrarás (father of journalist María Celeste Arrarás), she is a great-great-grandchild of Justo Del Pilar Goico Cebollero.

At an early age, her mother took her and her sister to Spain after breaking up with her father. She returned to the Dominican Republic after nearly ten years of living abroad, when her parents reconciled.

== Career ==
Charytín moved to Puerto Rico in the 1970s. She met her husband, television actor and producer Elín Ortiz, while he was visiting the Dominican Republic and he became her manager. He was recently divorced from Puerto Rican vedette Iris Chacón. Later, Charytín and Ortiz started a relationship and married in 1974. During the 1970s, she began a weekly TV show on WAPA-TV, which aired every Sunday night until 1985.

Charytín became an international superstar with her song "Mosquita Muerta," named after a character she played on a comedy section of her show, becoming a chart topper in places such as Mexico, Venezuela, and Argentina.

In 1974, she represented the Dominican Republic in the third edition of the OTI Festival, held in Acapulco, México, in which she came in fifth place, with seven points. In 1979, she and Ortiz had their first son, Shalim, who is now a singer and actor who has appeared on Lizzie McGuire and Heroes.

In 1983, Charytín made a movie in Spanish named Prohibido Amar en Nueva York (Forbidden To Love in New York) with Mexican actor Julio Alemán. Two of the songs on the movie's soundtrack, Tu Vida Es Un Suspenso Hasta El Final & Para Llegar, became more chart toppers. In 1986, she and Iris Chacón acted together, alongside Dominican-Mexican actor Andrés García and Puerto Rican best-selling singer Yolandita Monge, on the soap opera Escandalo. The telenovela did not enjoy much success and was cut by half by the producers. In 1988, she moved to Miami with Ortiz and Shalim, and in late 1989, she became pregnant again, giving birth in 1990 to twins, a boy (Alexander) and a girl (Sharinna), born at Pavia Hospital in San Juan, Puerto Rico.

During the early 1990s, she dedicated herself to raising her twins, taking them along on the few tours she did and her several trips to Puerto Rico. Late in the 1990s, she returned to television, hosting a show for a television shopping network. Additionally, she worked on commercials promoting Palmolive dish washing products for several years, most of which featured her twins.

In 2002, she began hosting the two-hour celebrity gossip show Escándalo TV (formerly Escándalo en el Medio Dia but later changed due to a similarly named program airing in Mexico by Televisa S.A.), along with Marisa del Portillo, Felipe Viel and Lilia Luciano for Univisión sister station TeleFutura. In 2007, the Art Critics Association of the Dominican Republic recognized her work with a lifetime achievement award.

On April 19, 2003, Charytín won the Asociación de Cronistas de Espectáculos de Nueva York's Premio Extraordinario ACE por Distinción y Mérito (ACE Extraordinary Award for Distinction and Merit) at the 35th Annual ACE Awards presentation.

Later on, she had a new TV show, Charytín, on Mega TV that aired weekdays.

In 2026, Charytin is an active host of a high ranking audience based TV show, Desiguales airing on Univision.

== Discography ==
=== Albums ===
- Charytín (1974)
- Bailemos El Bimbo (1975)
- Alexandra (1975)
- La Compositora (1976)
- La Dulce Charytín (1977)
- Mosquita Muerta (1978)
- Calor (1979)
- Charytín (1980)
- La Sencillez (1981)
- Canciones de la pelicula Prohibido Amar en Nueva York (1982)
- Se Acabo... (1983)
- Guitarras y Violines (1984)
- Verdades Desnudas (1985)
- De Regreso Al Pasado (1987)
- Por Ese Hombre... (1988)
- Sutil (1992)
- Recuerdos (1995)
- 7 Vidas (2014)

== See also ==
- List of television presenters
- List of people from the Dominican Republic
