= Sonia Noemí =

Puerto Rican actress and singer

- Born: Sonia Noemí González; July 18, 1941 (age 84)
- Origin: Bayamón, Puerto Rico
- Genres: Latin Pop
- Label: RCA

Sonia Noemi (born July 18, 1941 as Sonia Noemí González) is a Puerto Rican actress and singer. She is one of the pioneers of the ballad pop song in Puerto Rico.

== Biography ==
Noemí was raised in Old San Juan and when she was thirteen moved to Rio Piedras. She went to California in 1962 in order to train at the Pasadena Playhouse Studio, returning to Puerto Rico after a year. In 2003, she moved to Miami, where she has worked in telenovelas. She has a son with Venezuelan singer, Hector Cabrera.

== Discography ==
Alfred D. Herger was the producer of her first album: "Si yo fuera una reina" (If I were a Queen), *Sona-Rico, SR-1*. Sonia's hit single was "El rebelde", a Spanish version of the hit song "He's a Rebel", from The Crystals. Her second album was with the RCA-Victor record label in Mexico: "Baladas y boleros" (Ballads and Boleros), *MKL - 1626*. The hit single was "El Día" (The Day), written by the Mexican composer: "Luis Demetrio". Her third album, and second for RCA-Victor in Mexico, was "Baladas y boleros con Sonia Noemí", *MKL - 1627*. Sonia Noemí later recorded a fourth album, "Mi regreso" (My Comeback), produced by her and Canal 4 Recording Studios with the collaboration of Lou Briel, *LAG, LP-1010*.

== Film ==
Noemí, performed the leading roles of three films: "Dios te Salve Siquiatra", (May God Save you, Psychiatrist), the first Cuban motion picture filmed in the United States (Miami, Florida), produced and directed by Cuban comedian: Guillermo Alvarez Guedes, "El Curandero del Pueblo", (The Healing-man of the Town), starring with, Adalberto Rodriguez, "Machuchal", and Creature from the Haunted Sea, a Roger Corman film.

== See also ==
- List of Puerto Ricans
