= Shanom =

Puerto Rican personality

Shanom (born Luis Antonio Vázquez) is a Puerto Rican media personality. Shanom is best known for his musical parodies, comedy, stunts and political satire.

Shanom was part of the second longest-running morning show in the US Commonwealth. His version of the show was broadcast in Puerto Rico, Miami, Connecticut and Philadelphia. Luis has participated in various TV productions in both Telemundo and Univision of Puerto Rico and had his own TV show early on. Shanom is credited for having launched the career of many radio professionals in the island, mainly young aspiring students who later became active professionals and has received countless distinctions for his media work as well as his charitable work for the handicapped.

Luis's mainstream career was influenced by José Vallenilla who hired him as an assistant producer for a popular morning show (Cosmos 94) where, because of the nature of the presentation he was motivated to create countless parodies and bits that had to compete with the best in the business. Later he became the director of the show. Shanom had the added benefit of producing very convincing reproductions of the songs he parodied, and this became his signature. This was somewhat standard for this type of presentation, but he definitely stood out. All these gimmicks and presentations, interviews with international stars and many internet "firsts" kept his show at the top of pop culture at the time gaining various features and even headlines in the island news.

As a producer, the show held quite a distinction: longest-running morning show at the number one spot in its market (WOYE FM Cosmos 94 and WCMN, Delta 107). Luis worked as a producer with international star "Braulio Castillo" and local diva Mirayda Chavez in another famous radio station called Magic and co-produced a radio network dedicated to children.

He produced some of the first-ever "reggaeton" songs, a Puerto Rican insular genre that became known worldwide as an Urban Genre. He focused mainly on radio parodies for which he became well known. Some of his outstanding parodies include a song that was created for the then-upcoming movie "Batman" (La Baticueva) an original song that gained international attention and was also released as part of the album Mi Abuela by Wilfred Morales which became the first international mainstream parodies album out of PR. Shanom's parodies continued to impress the audience and that lead to other albums featuring Luis's work.

Because he is a musician, he would feature new artist and modalities that seemed risky at the time, It was thru this modality that artists like "Dinamic two", "Vico-C", "Evy Queen" and Falo" found their very first outlets to bring their brand of music into the spotlight which led the Reggaeton genre into the mainland USA and later the world.

Luis was instrumental in the revolution of internet radio in PR launching both the first internet stream for a radio station in PR and later paired with one of his students and launched a successful internet radio station dedicated to [reggaeton]: Radio Actitud. The station was re-broadcast on FM radio in both Mexico and Perú and helped launch the careers of various reggaeton artists.

Shanom belongs to the elite group of DJs that is credited for having developed the new style of Spanish Radio in America including (but not limited to) air personalities such as: Antonio Sánchez (El Gangster) José Vallenilla (Funky Joe), Pepe García, Billy Furket, Red Shadow, Franky Jay, Gilbert Merle, etc.

Shanom is currently a production and image director on a group of radio stations in the mainland USA called Rocking M Media.
