= El Circo de La Mega =

Puerto Rican morning radio show

- Genre: Morning radio show
- Running time: 5 hours (5:00 am – 10:00 am)
- Country of origin: Puerto Rico
- Home station: WMEG
- Starring: Padre Orlando Lugo; José Vallenilla; Sonya Cortes
- Original release: February 27, 2008
- Website: http://www.elcirco.net

El Circo de La Mega (or simply El Circo) is a morning radio show in Puerto Rico that airs on Mega 106.9 FM. The show premiered on February 27, 2008, and airs weekdays from 5:00am to 10:00am.

The show is hosted by Padre Orlando Lugo, José Vallenilla "Funky Joe" and Sonya Cortés. The show also features a variety of segments about video games, traffic, and gossip, among others. It also features interviews with celebrities as well as comedic characters.

The show has gained notoriety for its use of multimedia. Besides being transmitted on 106.9 and 95.1 FM, the show is also broadcast through the Internet through their website and live on channel 169 on DirecTV Puerto Rico. The show also includes a gaming platform for the hosts and listeners and a live chat. The show will also be broadcast to some cities in the United States.

On August 1, 2008, after only 5 months on the air, El Circo peaked at #1 in all the audience surveys conducted by Arbitron.
