= WSTE-DT =

Television station in Ponce, Puerto Rico

- Ponce–San Juan–Aguada–; Arecibo–Mayagüez; Puerto Rico
- City: Ponce, Puerto Rico
- Channels: Digital: 7 (VHF); Virtual: 7
- Branding: Univision Puerto Rico

Programming
- Affiliations: 7.1: Univision/UniMás; 7.2: WIPR-TV

Ownership
- Owner: TelevisaUnivision; (WSTE, LLC)

History
- First air date: February 2, 1958
- Former call signs: WRIK-TV (1958–1979); WLUZ-TV (1979–1987); WSTE (1987–2009)
- Former affiliations: Repeater of WKAQ-TV (1958–1969); Independent (1969–2018; 2019–2025); Hipodromo Camarero (2013–2020); Simulcast of Sistema TV (2018–2019)
- Call sign meaning: Siete = Spanish for seven

Technical information
- Licensing authority: FCC
- Facility ID: 60341
- ERP: see § Transmitter facilities
- HAAT: see § Transmitter facilities
- Transmitter coordinates: see § Transmitter facilities
- Translator(s): see § Transmitter facilities

Links
- Public license information: Public file; LMS

WSTE-DT (channel 7), branded as Univision Puerto Rico, is a television station licensed to Ponce, Puerto Rico, serving as the U.S. territory's outlet for the Spanish-language networks Univision and UniMás. Owned and operated by TelevisaUnivision, the station maintains studios on Calle Carazo in Guaynabo. To provide island-wide coverage, WSTE maintains a network of five transmitter sites, located at Cerro Maravilla in Ponce, at Cerro La Marquesa in Aguas Buenas, at Cerro Canta Gallo in Aguada, on Highway 22 in Arecibo, and at the Monte del Estado in San Germán.

== History ==
=== WRIK-TV ===
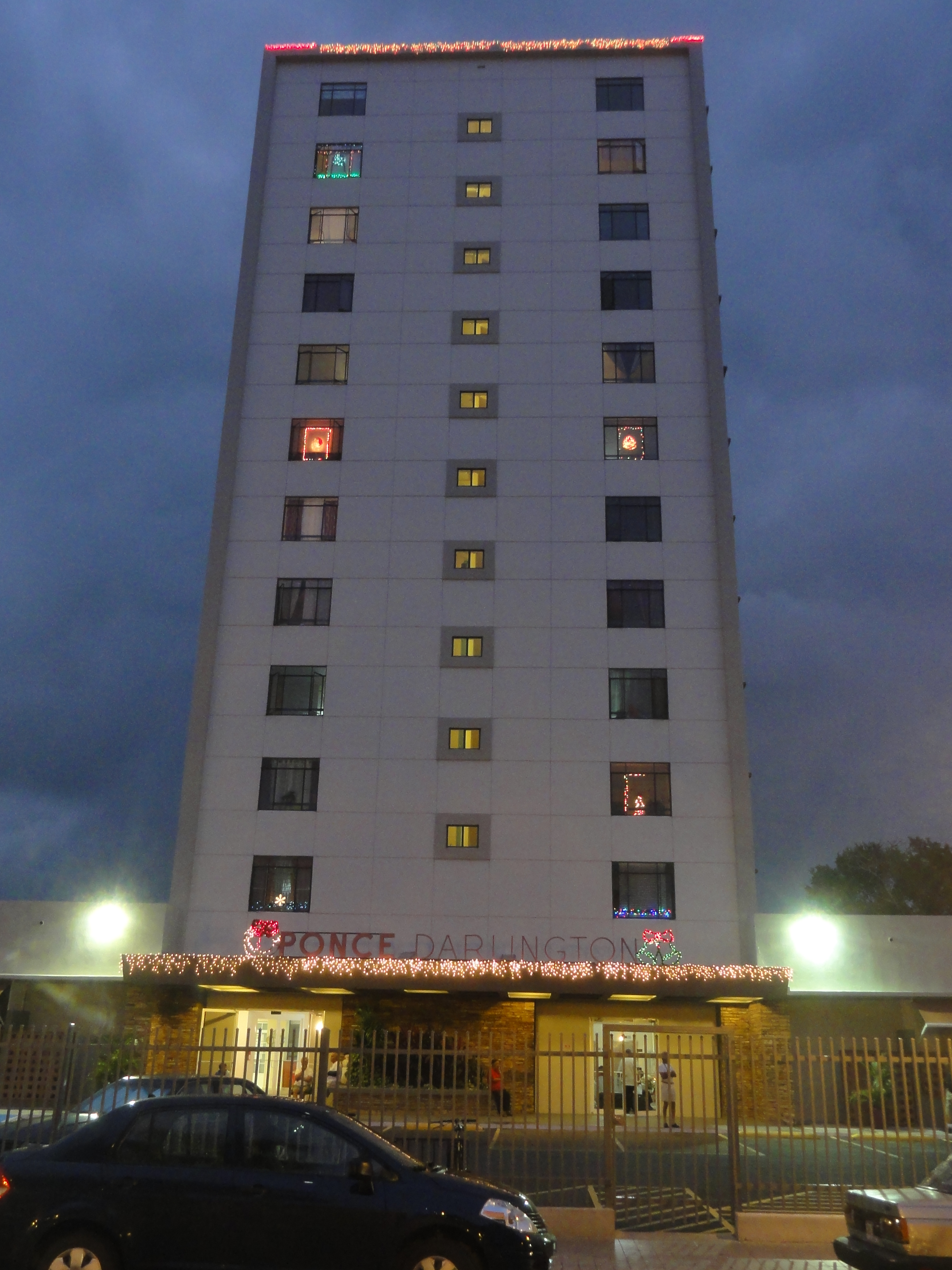
The 12-story Edificio Darlington, on Calle Marina in Ponce was the first home of WSTE-DT, then known as WRIK-TV (Note: For a 1965 photo of WRIK-TV at the Edificio Ponce Darlington, see Carmelo Rosario Natal, Ponce en su Historia Moderna: 1945-2002, Secretaría de Cultura y Turismo, Municipio Autónomo de Ponce, 2003, p. 205.)

The station first signed on as WRIK-TV on February 2, 1958, after receiving the FCC permit to go on the air on channel 7. It was the first television station in Ponce, and the fourth in Puerto Rico, after WKAQ-TV, WAPA-TV (both were established four years earlier), and WORA-TV (established three years earlier). It was owned by Alfredo Ramírez de Arellano. Its news director was Manuel Morales-Flores, with Felix Suria as production manager and Edmund Reid as its chief engineer. The station maintained a transmitter—originally located at El Vigía—and studios at the Edificio Darlington—the first high-rise building in Ponce, (Note: Although Carmelo Rosario Natal uses the term "multi-story" in his book to refer to Edificio Ponce Darlington, the correct term here would be "high-rise" (see definition of "multi-story building" at Emporis here) as defined by modern architectural engineers as well as real estate companies (See Emporis at High-rise building. Accessed August 10, 2019.). Ponce's first "multi-story building", on the other hand, was the three-story low-rise" at the northwest corner of the intersection of Calle Reina-Isabel and Calle Atocha, a building colloquially known as "El rascacielos de Ponce" (Ponce's skyscraper). For a 1915 photo, see Neysa Rodriguiez Deynes, Brevario Sobre la Historia de Ponce, Gobierno Municipal Autónomo de Ponce, Oficina de Cultura y Turismo, 2002, p. 51.) completed in 1952. Two years later, the transmitter was relocated to the Hotel Ponce Intercontinental.

WRIK-TV operated as a Spanish-language independent station; it carried some 18 daily programs, including news, movies, cartoons, and soap operas, among others. One notable show, airing in the late afternoons, was El Show de Tío Carlitos. In 1964, the station's staff had expanded to include president George A. Mayoral, general manager William Cortada, commercial manager and news director Luis A. "Wito" Morales, promotional manager Monsita M. Diaz, and chief engineer Americo Cintron. The transmitter was relocated atop Cerro Maravilla in 1967.

=== Rikavisión ===
In 1969, Ramírez de Arellano announced the sale of 80 percent of WRIK-TV to United Artists Corporation for a reported $7 million. Under United Artists, WRIK began operating from color-equipped studios in Ponce and San Juan and rebranded as "Rikavisión". The station's logo was a rooster. From San Juan, the station broadcast El Show de Tito Rodriguez for two seasons; the station also produced Ahi Va Eso (with Awilda Carbia, Jacobo Morales and Norma Candal), Contigo Anexo 3 (which included a young Lou Briel), Showtime (with Wilkins), Las Caribelles, El Show de Carol Myles, and children's show Rikalandia (hosted by Sandra Zaiter). One notable 1971 show was María, with Lucy Boscana. The station continued some programming from Ponce, including local newscasts. Its news anchor was Rafael L. Torres, in whose name the Southern Puerto Rico Chamber of Commerce later created an Excellence in Journalism award.

==== Cerro Maravilla incident ====
In 1978, two pro-independence activists attempted to blow up the WRIK-TV transmitter tower at Cerro Maravilla in an effort to call attention to their cause. Their plan was discovered by police and the two young men were ambushed by police at the peak during their operation. They were arrested and then murdered by the police while still in their custody at the peak.

=== Teleluz (1979–1987) ===
In 1979, WRIK-TV was acquired by Puerto Rican producer Tommy Muñiz, owner of AM radio station WLUZ (or Radio Luz); its callsign was subsequently changed to WLUZ-TV (branded as "Teleluz") on March 28, 1979.

Programs shown during this era included a continuation of Sandra Zaiter's children's show and live, low-budget professional boxing telecasts from around Puerto Rico on Saturday nights. Boxers who fought on Teleluz frequently included Julian and Rafi Solis, Felix Trinidad Sr. and Victor Callejas. A series of these fight programs, fourteen in total, were held at Estudios Teleluz from 1979 to 1980, usually on Monday or Wednesday nights.

=== SuperSiete (1987–2009) ===
Financial troubles forced Muñiz to sell the station to Malrite Communications Group for $1.3 million in 1985. In 1987, the station was rebranded as SuperSiete, and on February 18, 1987, the station changed its call letters to WSTE. The sale process included an agreement where Pedro Muñiz assured that the employees retained their work spaces and was completed at a final investment of $6 million. The station's transmitters were rearranged to cover the entire island, with the Cerro Maravilla facility being moved to Ponce and another being placed between Añasco and Rincón, with the new structure being inaugurated on February 22, 1987.

The station experienced limited success at the time using colorful motion graphics and a new logo as well as major advertising in newspapers, and televising popular American sitcoms of the time, such as The Fresh Prince of Bel-Air and The Simpsons, along with major Hollywood movies. It also was acknowledged for its children's show El Show de Burbujita y Bolillo, produced by Milly Cangiano, and its Saturday morning cartoons. Around this time, one of Puerto Rico's longest-running shows, No te Duermas with Antonio Sánchez El Gangster, began airing on channel 7 as well. WSTE also produced a successful game show, La Hora de Oro with Hector Marcano and Sánchez, and two family-oriented sitcoms, Maripili and El Cuartel de la Risa. SuperSiete also broadcast five daily news segments named Noticapsulas (literal translation: news capsules) anchored by Doris Torres.

In 1991, Malrite bought WLII-TV and WSUR-TV and sold WSTE to Siete Grande Television, Inc., owned by Florida entrepreneur Jerry Hartman. WSTE was then branded as "El Nuevo SuperSiete" ("The New SuperSeven"). During the 1990s, WSTE was rebranded as "Tele-Isla" during prime time hours. Due to the failure of the new programming, and the lack of full island coverage by WLII at the time, WSTE began rebroadcasting WLII's prime time programming mainly for the western and central areas of Puerto Rico.

In 1995, WLII entered into an affiliation agreement with WORA-TV. This created a conflict with the FCC, as WLII's programming was being rebroadcast by two different stations across the island; WLII and WSTE in the north, WSUR-TV and WSTE in the south, and WSTE, WNJX-TV and WORA-TV in the west. During this time, the channel proudly showed its coverage channels on its "ident", as 11-9-7-5-22. After admonishment by the FCC, WLII dropped WSTE and WNJX-TV coverage.

On March 23, 2007, Siete Grande Television, Inc. announced it would sell WSTE to Univision Communications. The sale was approved by the FCC on October 11, 2007. On June 23, 2009, the station's call letters were revised to WSTE-DT.

=== Teleisla (2009–2026) ===
Logo as Teleisla, used from 2012 to 2026.

The channel's SuperSiete "ident" animation, logo, and name survived for over 25 years, dating back to 1987. A new logo with the Teleisla branding was introduced a few months before the FCC-mandated digital transition date of June 12, 2009. On January 2, 2012, WSTE-DT introduced a new logo in the form of a four-color clover (orange representing morning, green representing afternoon, blue representing nighttime, and violet representing weekend programming). The station also expanded its broadcast day to 1 a.m. On November 1, 2012, Dish Network began carrying WSTE-DT on channel 12. In early 2016, WSTE-DT expanded its broadcast schedule to 24 hours a day, adding the health program Hablando de Salud from 1 to 7 a.m.

On December 16, 2025, it was announced that TelevisaUnivision would be ending their affiliation agreement with WLII-DT thus ending Univision's broadcast on that station after 23 years. TelevisaUnivision had been the owner and operator of WLII-DT from 2002 until 2021 when it was sold to Liberman Media Group; however, TelevisaUnivision remained the sole owner of the independent WSTE-DT (which simulcast WIPR-TV on its second subchannel) leading to speculation that Univision would be switching their programming to the station they owned in the island. The speculation proved true when it was announced on December 28 that all Univision and some UniMás programming would be moving exclusively to WSTE starting December 30. On that day at 7 a.m., the new schedule started with an airing of El Chapulín Colorado followed by Despierta América. Although the entire schedule is set to be TelevisaUnivision programming, the on-air branding of the station remained as Teleisla.

=== Univision Puerto Rico (2026–present) ===
On March 19, 2026, it was announced that Teleisla would be rebranded as Univision Puerto Rico (the same branding TelevisaUnivision used when it owned WLII-DT). The rebranding also included the addition of newscasts from Noticiero N+ Univision and Primer Impacto during the early fringe time slot.

On March 23, the rebranding became official when the Teleisla name and logo were retired from promotional spots and the on-screen watermark and replaced with the Unvision logo. As opposed to the previous version of Univision Puerto Rico, this iteration airs the entire afternoon block of programming live as it airs on the mainland with shows like Desiguales, Sientese Quien Pueda, El Gordo y la Flaca, Primer Impacto and Noticiero N+ Univision all airing live. The station does not have a news operation and instead will be airing Noticiero N+ Univision: Edicion Digital as a lead in for the national newscast.

== Technical information ==
=== Subchannels ===
The station's signal is multiplexed:

Subchannels of WSTE-DT
Subchannel	Res.	Short name	Programming
7.1	1080i	WSTE	Univisión/UniMás
7.2	1080i	WIPR TV	WIPR-TV

Simulcast of subchannels of another station

=== Analog-to-digital conversion ===
WSTE shut down its analog signal, over VHF channel 7, at noon on June 12, 2009, the official date on which full-power television stations in the United States transitioned from analog to digital broadcasts under federal mandate. The station's digital signal relocated from its pre-transition VHF channel 8 to channel 7 for its post-transition operations.

=== Transmitter facilities ===
To effectively cover all of Puerto Rico, WSTE used booster-type translator facilities across the island prior to the analog shutdown. In order for this booster system to work without any interference, WSTE's main transmitter had to be kept silent. The Ponce area was thus served from an auxiliary station transmitting at 100 kW. WSTE now uses a five-site, digital distributed transmission system to cover the island as the booster system had done before it.

WSTE-DT's facilities
City	Channel	ERP	HAAT	Facility ID	Transmitter coordinates
Ponce	7 (7)	25 kW	88 m (289 ft)	60341	18°2′45″N 66°39′15″W
San Juan	7 (7)	25 kW	354 m (1,161 ft)	60341	18°16′47″N 66°6′45″W
Mayagüez	7 (7)	10 kW	362 m (1,188 ft)	60341	18°19′18″N 67°10′26″W
Arecibo	7 (7)	2.1 kW	65 m (213 ft)	60341	18°27′14″N 66°45′15″W
San Germán	7 (7)	0.5 kW	631 m (2,070 ft)	60341	18°8′51.8″N 66°58′59.6″W

WSTE's old analog booster system
Station	Type	City	Channel	ERP	HAAT	Facility ID	Transmitter coordinates
WSTE	Main (kept silent)	Ponce	7	18.6 kW	826 m (2,710 ft)	60341	18°9′10.5″N 66°33′15.4″W
WSTE	Auxiliary	Ponce	7	100 kW	88 m (289 ft)	60341	18°2′45″N 66°39′15″W
WSTE1	Booster	San Juan	7	2.0 kW	341 m (1,119 ft)	91770	18°16′22″N 66°6′48″W
WSTE2	Booster	Mayagüez	7	24.1 kW	386 m (1,266 ft)	91773	18°19′18″N 67°10′26″W
WSTE3	Booster	Arecibo	7	5.1 kW	62 m (203 ft)	91771	18°27′14″N 66°45′15″W
