= Héctor Marcano =

Puerto Rican comedian and producer (born 1965)

- Born: Héctor Marcano; 3 November 1956 (age 69); Ponce, Puerto Rico
- Known for: producer, comedian, host, game show host

Héctor Marcano (born November 3, 1956) is a Puerto Rican producer, host, actor, and comedian. Marcano is also an owner of low-power television station WWXY-LD Channel 17.

Hector Marcano currently serves as Vice President of Hispanic Operations East, for iHeartMedia. Marcano works with iHeartMedia's Hispanic radio stations, with a special focus in the Miami, Chicago, Orlando, and Atlanta markets.

== Early years ==
Héctor Marcano was born in Ponce, Puerto Rico.

== Career ==
Marcano began his career as a disk jockey and eventually became the programming director of radio station KQ-105. Entering the 1980s, Marcano was contracted by Rafo Muñiz to appear in two shows at WRIK-TV, Los pupilos and Latino. The first was a comedy, in which he depicted one of several college students. The second, a formal show where he served as host and interviewer.

Following the murder of Luis Vigoreaux, Alfredo Hernández contracted Marcano to fill the role meant to the deceased host in game show A millón. He hosted along with Sonia Noemí and Rafael José. The show was rated the number one television game show for several years, breaking audience records for its type. Roberto Vigoreaux, son of Luis Vigoreaux, replaced him at WRIK-TV.

In 1987, alongside El Gangster Marcano performed as host of Super Siete's La Hora de Oro, following the conclusion of A millón. A move to WAPA-TV was proposed, but only Marcano left. In the same year, Marcano had a highly publicized wedding to Ivette Rivera-Lisojo. The wedding was shown live on Puerto Rican television. Vea, a local show biz magazine, produced a wedding album about the event.

In January 1990, Marcano moved to Telemundo to start a new show Marcano... el show. It was retransmitted internationally through Telemundo Internacional. Marcano... el show was one of several lowbrow comedies that gathered success during this timeframe, rivaling Sunshine's Café and No te Duermas.

In 1996, Marcano moved to WAPA-TV and produced a new game show called Vale Más, and in 1998, another show called El Super Show.

In 2000, he moved to Tele-Once but continued with El Super Show for a while. Later in 2000 Marcano created Que Suerte que es Domingo. This show underwent two title changes: Que Suerte Tienes Tú, and in 2002, Que Suerte, his longest running show, and top in the ratings consequently, broadcast by Univision. It was broadcast in Puerto Rico and in the Miami, New York and Philadelphia metropolitan areas via their respective Univision affiliates. In 2011, the show moved to Telemundo and was renamed Factor Suerte.

In 2016, Marcano was appointed to the Board of Directors of Viva Entertainment Group, Inc.

On May 25, 2020, Marcano returns to the Puerto Rican television airwaves, hosting the new talk show, titled MegaNoche which will broadcast from his home in Orlando and will be air live from Puerto Rico on Mega TV-owned station WTCV at 7:00 pm on weekdays.

== See also ==
- Avelino Muñoz Stevenson
- List of television presenters/Puerto Rico
- List of Puerto Ricans
