= NotiCentro =

Daily television news program for WAPA

- Updated logo (2025-present)
- Also known as: NotiCentro Al Amanecer (Morning Broadcast); NotiCentro a las 11am (11am Broadcast); NotiCentro: Edición Estelar (4pm broadcast); NotiCentro a las 11pm (Night time broadcast); NotiCentro Al Amanecer Fin de Semana (Weekend Morning Broadcast); NotiCentro Fin de Semana (Weekend Edition); NotiCentro América (Mainland U.S. broadcast); NotiCentro Orlando (Regional U.S. broadcast)
- Genre: News program
- Presented by: Normando Valentín; Katiria Soto; Jorge Gelpí Pagán; Mónika Candelaria; Aixa Vázquez; Guillermo José Torres, Jr.; Felipe Gómez; Jorge Viera; Sylvia Verónica Camacho; Kelvin Meléndez; Alanis Quiñones
- Opening theme: "Truth V2" by 615 Music
- Ending theme: Same as opening
- Country of origin: Puerto Rico
- Original language: Spanish

Production
- Executive producer: Niria Ruiz
- Production locations: Guillermo José Torres Studio at WAPA-TV, Guaynabo, Puerto Rico
- Camera setup: Multi-camera
- Running time: Al Amanecer: 300 minutes 11am: 30 minutes Edición Estelar: 90 minutes Nighttime: 30 minutes Weekend Mornings: 180 minutes Weekends: 60 minutes
- Production company: WAPA Media Group

Original release
- Network: WAPA; WAPA América; WAPA Orlando; WAPA+
- Release: 1976 – present

Related
- Telenoticias; Las Noticias

NotiCentro (NewsCenter) is the flagship news broadcast of Puerto Rican network WAPA which airs four times a day on weekdays and three times a day on weekends. Its main edition is anchored by Normando Valentín and Katiria Soto while Felipe Gómez anchors the nighttime edition. Weekend anchoring duties belong to Sylvia Verónica Camacho, Kelvin Meléndez and Alanis Quiñones, while weekday mornings are anchored by Jorge Gelpí Pagán and Mónika Candelaria, and Guillermo José Torres Jr. anchors the midday edition. Jorge Viera anchors NotiCentro Orlando, a local newscast for the Orlando and Central Florida audiences.

Established in 1976, NotiCentro is the second longest running newscast in Puerto Rico and airs in the mainland United States through WAPA's cable superstation WAPA América, WAPA's regional affiliate WOTF-TV (channel 26) in Orlando, in partnership with Entravision Communications and WAPA's FAST Channel WAPA+

== History ==
=== Noticentro 4 ===
Though WAPA-TV was established in 1954 it did not have a news operation until the late 70s when Evelio Otero (who at the time anchored the island's only newscast Telenoticias on WKAQ-TV) jumped to WAPA to anchor the newly newscast called Noticentro 4 (Newscenter 4). The station would occasionally drop the number 4 from their name (a reference to the channel's over the air number) and just by NotiCentro, this would first happen in 1995, then again in 1998 and again in 2007.

=== Guillermo Jose Torres' Tenure ===
In 1969, Evelio Otero exited WAPA and was replaced in the anchor chair at 10:00 PM by Guillermo José Torres, a Navy veteran who first served as a radio host in Ponce, Puerto Rico before joining NotiCentro.

Torres would go on to become the most important fixture in the history of the newscast with a career that spawned over 40 years as the anchor of the main 5:00 p.m. edition of NotiCentro. Torres had multiple co-anchors, such as José Enrique “Kike” Cruz (who later served as a news director for 36 years), Luz Nereida Vélez, Sylvia Gómez, Jennifer Wolff, and Ada Torres Toro. Torres also anchor the news at 11:00 AM with Keylla Hernandez. In 2001, Torres was joined by Celimar Adames Casalduc with the two becoming the lead anchor team of NotiCentro at 5:00 PM for 12 years until Torres' retirement.

In July 2013, Guillermo Jose Torres announced his retirement after 43 years anchoring NotiCentro. His retirement became official in August 2013 when a special edition of NotiCentro took place to celebrate his career. During the special, it was announced that Torres would be inducted into the Guinness World Records as the longest career as anchor of the same newscast. Torres was succeeded on the anchor chair by Rafael Lenin López.

Upon his retirement, the news studio at WAPA-TV headquarters was renamed "Guillermo Jose Torres Studio".

=== New Anchors and Revamp ===
After Torres' retirement, Rafael Lenin López and Celimar Adames continued as anchors of NotiCentro until 2017 Pedro Rosa Nales joined Celimar Adames as anchors until 2019. After Lopez's promotion WAPA announced a revamp of their entire daytime schedule that would extend the run time of the prime edition of NotiCentro from 60 minutes to 90 minutes, this would also move NotiCentro's start time from 5:00 p.m. to 4:00 p.m.. Lopez also announced that with its new start time NotiCentro would go through a revamp featuring a new studio and new anchor. In May 2019, it was announced that Normando Valentín would be taking over as the sole anchor of NotiCentro ending Celimar Adames' 17-year tenure as anchor of the newscast. The revamped version of NotiCentro officially launched on May 20, 2019.

On January 30, 2020, it was reported that Katiria Soto (who had served as co-anchor of WXTV-DT's morning newscast) would be joining Normando Valentin as the new co-anchor of the evening NotiCentro newscast. This marked Soto's return to the station where she had previously hosted a news magazine called Wapa a las 4 (Wapa at 4). Soto's first episode as anchor aired on February 3, 2020.

On October 31, 2024, after nearly 44 years working at WAPA-TV, Pedro Rosa Nales retired from the station as an anchor and reporter.

== NotiCentro América ==
In 2004, WAPA-TV (Then known as Televicentro) launched WAPA América, a Superstation feed that would be available on cable services in the mainland United States and would allow viewers to watch local WAPA programming while living outside of Puerto Rico. In October 2014 WAPA announced that they were launching a version of their newscast that would air in the WAPA América feed called NotiCentro América (Newscenter America) and would feature a mixture of national American stories that affect viewers living in the mainland and local Puerto Rican stories that would keep the diaspora residents up to date with the happenings on the island. This version of the newscast is anchored by Felipe Gómez and airs at 8:00 p.m. ET. NotiCentro América premiered on October 13, 2014.

== NotiCentro Al Amanecer ==
NotiCentro Al Amanecer Logo (2025-present)

On June 5, 2000, WAPA (then known as Televicentro) launched their own Breakfast television show, a version of their newscast that would run from 5:30 a.m. to 9 a.m. and would be called NotiCentro al Amanecer (Noticentro at Sunrise), the original anchors of NotiCentro al Amanecer were Pedro Rosa Nales and Luz Nereida Vélez who were joined by Jorge Gelpí Pagán on weather.

In 2007, the program was overhauled, Normando Valentín and Keylla Hernández joined the show as the new anchors. Pagán remained as the weather reporter and Aixa Vazquez joined in as the traffic reporter. This version of the show gained popularity among viewers due to the chemistry between Valentín and Hernandez and the laid back/good nature demeanor that the cast would have while presenting the program.

In 2015, Keylla Hernández was diagnosed with lung cancer. Hernández made the surprising announcement during one of her segments on the show and reassured viewers she would be going through intense treatment to battle it. Throughout her treatment, Hernández continued anchoring the show and participating in major activities like anniversaries and holiday celebrations. On December 31, 2018, Keylla Hernández died after a three-year battle with cancer. Her death led to major changes on the program, with her co-anchor Normando Valentín leaving the show to host the evening newscast.

In 2019, Mónika Candelaria and Jorge Gelpí Pagán were officially named the new anchors of NotiCentro Al Amanecer, they would be joined by Aixa Vazquez in traffic and Ada Monzón in the weather report.

On January 21, 2021, a major change was announced to Noticentro al Amanecer with the arrival of Yizette Cifredo and José Santana. Cifredo and Santana jumped from TeleOnce to join NotiCentro al Amanecer in its new format. Starting January 28, 2021, the show would now be split into two with the program running a straight newscast from 5:00 a.m. to 8:00 a.m. and then at 8:00 a.m. Cifredo and Santana join the show for the magazine portion of the show which would focus on guest interviews, entertainment news, cooking segment, among other variety segments.

In 2021, weather reporter, Ada Monzón was promoted to the evening newscast thus leaving NotiCentro al Amanecer. Carlos Omar Rivera was introduced as her successor on June 3, 2022.

=== Al Amanecer Fin De Semana ===
On December 4, 2024, during WAPA's upfront presentation it was announced that NotiCentro's breakfast show will begin airing a weekend edition starting in Fall 2025, this would place NotiCentro as the first (and only) newscast to air a morning newscast on weekends in Puerto Rico.

On September 23, 2025, WAPA announced that the show would begin airing live every Saturday and Sunday Morning starting in October and that the space would feature a team of 20 people, 10 of which were new hires. It was also announced that the station planned a revamp of their news set/studio to usher in a new era.

During the September 29, 2025 edition of NotiCentro Al Amanecer the new set was unveiled, along with an updated logo and new graphics package. During the broadcast the team that will be anchoring the new weekend edition was also introduced. Sylvia Verónica Camacho will be in charge of anchoring the news portion, meanwhile Jose Santana will be anchoring the entertainment portion of the program. Additionally, Emilio Perez will be anchoring the sports desk and former TeleOnce reporters Yarimar Marrero and Isaac Rosado Santos will make the jump to NotiCentro as field reporter for the new show. New meteorologist, Cherilyn Toro will anchor the weather report. Among the many collaborators that were announced for the show the station announced the return of Douglas Candelario who had taken his DIY Gardening segment to rival morning show Hoy Día at Telemundo Puerto Rico in 2023 after being a collaborator for NotiCentro for over a decade.

== On-air Staff ==
=== Current on-air staff ===
==== Anchors ====
- Normando Valentín - Edición Estelar
- Katiria Soto - Edición Estelar
- Jorge Gelpí Pagán - NotiCentro al Amanecer
- Mónika Candelaria - NotiCentro al Amanecer / Primera Edición
- Guillermo José Torres Jr. - NotiCentro 11am
- Felipe Gómez - Edición Nocturna / NotiCentro América / En Una Semana
- Jorge Viera - NotiCentro Orlando
- Sylvia Verónica Camacho - NotiCentro al Amanecer Fin de Semana
- Kelvin Meléndez - Fin de Semana
- Alanis Quiñones - Fin de Semana

==== Weather ====
- Ada Monzón - Chief Meteorologist / Edición Estelar
- Carlos Omar Rivera - NotiCentro al Amanecer / NotiCentro 11am / Fin de Semana
- Suheily López Belén - Edición Nocturna
- Cherilyn Toro - NotiCentro al Amanecer / NotiCentro al Amanecer Fin de Semana / NotiCentro 11am

==== Collaborators ====
- Yizette Cifredo - Host, NotiCentro Al Amanecer
- José Santana - Host, NotiCentro Al Amanecer
- Aixa Vazquez - Host, NotiCentro Al Amanecer / Traffic Reporter
- Luz Nereida Vélez - Health Correspondent / Field Reporter
- Nicole Chacón - Entertainment reporter
- José Vega Santana "Remi"
- Jay Fonseca - political analyst
- Juan Dalmau - political analyst

==== Sports ====
(Sports personnel also works for the station's sports network WAPA Deportes)

- Kefren Velázquez
- Natalia Meléndez
- Emilio Pérez

==== Reporters ====
- Isaac Rosado Santos - Field reporter
- Sylvi Escoto - Field reporter
- Tatiana Pérez Ramos - Field reporter
- Luisa Benítez - Field reporter
- Elsa Velázquez Santiago - Field reporter
- Adriana Rozas Rivera - Field reporter
- Yarimar Marrero - Field reporter
- Ariana Rivera Franco - Field reporter
- Laura Isabel Pérez - NotiCentro Orlando field reporter
- Luis Marcano - NotiCentro Orlando field reporter
- Laura Bermudez - NotiCentro Orlando field reporter

=== Former on-air staff ===
- Guillermo José Torres (retired)
- Kike Cruz (retired, later at TeleOnce)
- Pedro Rosa Nales (retired)
- Rafael Bracero (retired)
- Keylla Hernandez (deceased)
- Celimar Adames Casalduc (now at TeleOnce)
- Deborah Martorell (now at TeleOnce)
- Rafael Lenin López (now at Telemundo and Magic Radio Network)
- Julio Rivera Saniel (now at Telemundo)
- Luis Guardiola (now at Telemundo)
- José Esteves (later at Telemundo, now retired)
- Walter Soto León (now at Telemundo)
- Efren Arroyo (deceased)
- Albert Cruz (retired)
- Alberto Rullán (now at WWSI)
- Ariel Rivera Vázquez (now at KVDA)
- Arnaldo Rojas (later at TeleOnce)
- Orlando Rivera Martinez (now at Telemundo)
- Maritza Cañizares (retired)
- Mardelis Jusino (now at ABC Puerto Rico)
- Luis Rigual (deceased)
- Yesenia Torres Figueroa (now at Univision and TeleOnce)
- Juan Manuel García Passalacqua (deceased)
- Miguel Ramos (now at WIPR-TV)
- Ada Torres Toro (previously at WSJN-TV)
- Cyd Marie Fleming (now at TeleOnce)
- Sylvia Gómez (later at Telemundo, now semiretired)
- Carmen Jovet (now at ABC Puerto Rico)
- Carmen Dominicci
- Barbara Bermudo (later at Univision)
- Elizabeth Robaina (now at Telemundo)
- Néstor Flecha (now at KXTX-TV)
- Syrmarie Villalobos (now at KXTX-TV)
- Jennifer Wolff (later at TeleOnce and Telemundo, deceased)
- Maricarmen Ortiz (now at TeleOnce)
- Reina Mateo (now at El Vocero)
- Tatiana Ortiz (previously at TeleOnce and Telemundo)
- Jamiebeth González
- Alberto Sanchez Laó (now at Telemundo)
- Zoe Laboy (now at TeleOnce)
- Lourdes del Río (now at Univision)
- Leslie Cruz (retired)
- Luis Francisco Ojeda (later at WKAQ-AM)
- Carlos Díaz Olivo (now at Telemundo)
- Alexandra Lúgaro (now at TeleOnce and MoluscoTV)

== Anchor Controversies ==
=== Celimar Adames Discrimination Lawsuit ===
On February 20, 2020, Celimar Adames Casalduc filed a lawsuit against the parent company of WAPA-TV (Televicentro de Puerto Rico) citing Discrimination in employment; Law of Equal Pay; Reprisal. The lawsuit stemmed from the decision the station made a year before of removing her from her post as co-anchor (a position she held for 27 years). The station expressed they wanted to present the newscast with only one anchor in the studio which would be Normando Valentin, however, eight months later the station hired Katiria Soto as Valentin's new co-anchor for the evening newscast.

In the lawsuit, Adames stated that she had been bringing up to WAPA management issues with pay disparity during every contract negotiation she's had with them dating back to 2006 but the issue was never resolved. The issue became more apparent after Guillermo Jose Torres retired and Rafael Lenin Lopez was promoted to anchor, Adames states that Lenin was awarded a pay increase that had him earning more money than her even though they were doing the same amount of work and Adames had more experience in the position.

Additionally, the lawsuit states that during contract negotiations in 2018, WAPA tried to include a clause that would prohibit her from discussing her contract or her salary with any of her coworkers. Through her lawyer Adames informed management that they had to remove this clause from the contract and once again brought up the pay disparity between her and her male colleagues, in response WAPA removed her as anchor and changed the format of the newscast.

As terms of the lawsuit, Adames requested back pay for the time where she had been away from her position as anchor and she also requested to be reinstated as anchor of the evening newscast.

In June 2021, Adames left WAPA after 30 years at the station. She was joined by meteorologist Deborah Martorell (who had worked at the station for 27 years) as they both accepted offers to join rival station TeleOnce and their relaunched newscast Las Noticias. In October 2021, Celimar Adames and WAPA-TV reached a settlement on the lawsuit the terms of which are confidential.

=== Pedro Rosa Nales ===
On December 11, 2020, yet another lawsuit was filed by the anchor of the night time broadcast and the U.S. mainland broadcast, Pedro Rosa Nales. In his lawsuit, Rosa Nales made claims similar to those of Celimar Adames where he claims there was a pay disparity between him and other anchors that were doing a lesser amount of work. The lawsuit states that at some point Rosa Nales was the anchor of up to three different editions of the newscast but was still being paid less than reporters that were only anchoring one edition. Rosa Nales states in the lawsuit he believes the difference in salary stemmed from discrimination because of his age and race and he claimed $2.5 million in damages. Rosa Nales settled the lawsuit with WAPA in May 2023 with the terms of the settlement remaining confidential. Rosa Nales continued to work for NotiCentro anchoring the weekday 11:00 p.m. broadcast and the U.S. Mainland edition of the newscast until his retirement on October 31, 2024.
