= Luz Nereida Vélez =

Puerto Rican television journalist

- Born: Mayagüez, Puerto Rico
- Occupation: Television journalist
- Awards: Gold Circle Emmy Award (NATAS, Suncoast Chapter, 2022)

Luz Nereida Vélez (born October 6, 1955) is a Puerto Rican television news reporter and anchorwoman on the WAPA-TV news show NotiCentro 4, having worked since 1978.

== Early life and career ==
Vélez grew up in the western Puerto Rico town of Mayagüez. There, she used to play with a tape recorder and microphone at her family's house. She would practice talking about news and play music with this recorder.

Vélez excelled in school, becoming a member of a group for very intelligent students. She was accepted, at the young age of 15, to the University of Puerto Rico at Mayagüez, from where she hoped to graduate with a medical degree as a surgeon. It was while there that she got her first job as an anchorwoman, when she was hired by a local radio station, WOLE, which covered the areas of Mayagüez and Aguadilla.

== Television career ==
Luz Nereida Vélez, from NotiCentro 4, interviews Puerto Rican cartoonist John Rivas in 2012.

Vélez lived in Pittsburgh, Pennsylvania for a period. She wanted to enroll at Syracuse University, but decided, during a vacation trip to Puerto Rico, to telephone WAPA-TV from San Juan's airport and ask if there were any internships available. During the drive from Isla Verde International Airport in San Juan, to her hometown of Mayagüez, Vélez told her father to detour and make a stop at the WAPA-TV building. There, she was interviewed by their news director, Bill Perez. She was offered a screen test and soon she was contracted by the station, becoming the first woman to present news for WAPA.

In 1978, at the age of 23, Vélez joined NotiCentro 4 as a television news reporter. She soon became a celebrity in Puerto Rico. Originally, she worked the show's afternoon and nightly editions, then, once a morning edition (NotiCentro al Amanecer) was launched, she also began working on that. As of 2022, Velez had spent 48 years as a television newscaster.

On May 16, 2023, she was honored at Noticentro 4 for her 45 years on that show.

=== Award ===
On June 13, 2022, Vélez, along with Sylvia Gómez, Cyd Marie Fleming and Eddie Miró (who received a Gold Circle Award for his fifty years on Puerto Rican television) was recognized with a Silver Circle Emmy award for her 48 years as a television reporter.

== Personal life ==
Vélez grew up in a house where both Spanish and English were spoken and encouraged as languages by her parents. She is bilingual, having learned English by practicing it one hour every day as a young girl.

Vélez met Ovi Ramos, 23 years her junior, during 2016. Ramos is a singer for a rock band named La Novena. A couple of years later, the couple had separated.

Vélez has a daughter: a singer and internet influencer named Alhanna, who released her first album, "De Rumba", in 2019.

== See also ==
- List of Puerto Ricans
- Guillermo Jose Torres
- Rafael Bracero
- Pedro Rosa Nales
- Efren Arroyo
- Jennifer Wolff
- Luis Antonio Cosme
- Maria Falcon
- Anibal Gonzalez Irizarry
- Junior Abrams
- Luis Francisco Ojeda
- Avelino Muñoz Stevenson
- Keylla Hernández
- Enrique Cruz
- Bruni Vélez
