= Jorge Rivera Nieves =

Puerto Rican television journalist and anchorman

- Born: January 22, 1951 (age 75); Río Piedras, Puerto Rico
- Occupation: Television journalist
- Relatives: 2 daughters (Grenda, Monica)

Jorge Rivera Nieves (born January 22, 1951) is a Puerto Rican television news anchorman. He is an anchorman at Telemundo Puerto Rico's daily television news show, "Telenoticias".

== Early life ==
Rivera Nieves was born in the San Juan suburb of Río Piedras, the son of Jorge Rivera, from the southern Puerto Rican city of San Germán and of Esperanza Nieves, from Yabucoa, a city in eastern Puerto Rico.

As a youth, Rivera Nieves enjoyed reading. He was elected class president during his ninth-grade year, and one of his teachers, named Eligio Armstrong, noticed Rivera Nieves had the ability to speak well in public, encouraging Rivera Nieves to try a career as a radio announcer. Rivera Nieves did his high school studies at Central High School in Santurce, another suburb of San Juan.

From 1968, when Rivera Nieves was in his late teens, until 1976, he worked as an announcer at WAPA-Radio, and he was soon also working at television's canal 4 as a show host, television journalist and announcer in a number of that television channel's shows.

In 1977, Junior Abrams, a sportscaster, informed Rivera Nieves that WKAQ-TV ("canal 2") was planning a news show. Both of them took auditions, and they were both hired.

== Career at Telemundo ==
At Telemundo's television news show, "Telenoticias" (which was then known as "Telenoticias en Accion"), Rivera Nieves joined Abrams and Anibal Gonzalez Irizarry, Sylvia Gómez, Raúl Quiñones (who had also been his newscast mate at canal 4 before) and others. In 1986, Rivera Nieves was upgraded to become one of the show's anchormen, a position he has since retained.

== Honors ==
In June 2022, Rivera Nieves was honored with two honorary degrees, by the Ana G. Méndez University and the Caribbean University.

== Personal life ==
Rivera Nieves had two daughters with Lucy Davila Adorno. One of his daughters is Grenda Rivera Davila, who is herself a television journalist too. The other one is Monica Rivera Davila, a lawyer.

For years, Rivera Nieves has enjoyed a personal friendship with Pedro Rosa Nales of "Telenoticias"' rival show, WAPA-TV's "Noticentro 4", where Rivera Nieves used to work during the 1970s. For years also, he had a strong friendship with another television reporter, Efren Arroyo, to whom Rivera Nieves made a dedication after it was announced that Arroyo had died of COVID-19 in 2021.

The latter two joined Rivera Nieves in playing the Three Wise Men during a boat parade celebrating the 2013 holidays in San Juan.

== See also ==
- List of Puerto Ricans
- Guillermo Jose Torres
- Rafael Bracero
- Pedro Rosa Nales
- Efren Arroyo
- Jennifer Wolff
- Luis Antonio Cosme
- Maria Falcon
- Aníbal González Irizarry
- Junior Abrams
- Luis Francisco Ojeda
- Avelino Muñoz Stevenson
- Keylla Hernández
- Zugey Lamela
- Sylvia Gómez
