= Enrique Cruz (journalist) =

Puerto Rican television newscaster

- Born: José Enrique Cruz Díaz; December 28, 1952 (age 73); Orocovis, Puerto Rico
- Known for: Television news journalist
- Spouse: Ligia Serrallés
- Children: 3 (Maria Margaríta, José Enrique, Jr., Jorge Juan)
- Parent(s): Carmelo Cruz and Berta Díaz

José Enrique "Kike" Cruz Díaz (born 28 December 1952), better known as Enrique "Kike" Cruz, is a Puerto Rican television journalist. A former news director of Canal 4, Cruz is in the Guinness Book of World Records as having the longest career as a television news director, being the news director of Canal 4's news show, Noticentro 4, for 42 years.

== Early life ==
Cruz was born in Orocovis, Puerto Rico, the son of businessman Carmelo Cruz and homemaker Berta Díaz.

In high school, Cruz used to do the school announcements on the school's public speaker. He was selected as class, student council and Catholic students body president.

At the age of 19, Cruz debuted as a radio news journalist at WIAC, a radio station in San Juan. Cruz during the era also took curses at the University of Puerto Rico, where he wanted to study medicine at first, but from where he graduated with a bachelor's degree in general studies instead. He then worked for WKAQ radio and for 11Q, which were two other San Juan radio stations.

Soon, however, his life would change when he met Alfred D. Herger, who, alongside Evelio Otero, invited Cruz to join television's Canal 4 as a news reporter on their television news show, "Noticentro 4".

== Television news journalist ==
"Kike" Cruz started at WAPA-TV during 1976. He was a news anchorman at Noticentro 4, along with others such as Guillermo Jose Torres, Pedro Rosa Nales and Luz Nereida Velez. On 10 November 1980, he was named vice-president and director of the channel's news department.

Cruz reported on many international news as a Noticentro 4 journalist. Among the news that really left a personal impact on him were the Jonestown Massacre in Guyana and the Maria Hurricane in Puerto Rico. In the Jim Jones suicide-murder case at the so-called "Jonestown", Cruz flew to Guyana to cover the news and he reported in Guyana from a helicopter live to Puerto Rican audiences, and viewing the bodies of the dead from the helicopter affected him. Another important news event Cruz covered live was the arrival of Pope John Paul II to Puerto Rico in 1984, in a transmission in which he was also the general producer. That moment was the first, and, as of 2023, only time a Pope has visited Puerto Rico.

Cruz retired as a television journalist at canal 4 in the early 2010s.

During 2019, Cruz made a brief comeback to his career as a television journalist, rejoining Noticentro 4 for a bit while, while the channel found someone else to do that job. He then proceeded to, in 2021, join Canal 11's news department.

== Personal life ==
Cruz married Ligia Serrallés. The couple had three children: daughter Maria Margaríta (born in 1979) and sons José Enrique, Jr. (born 1990) and Jorge Juan (born 2000).

== See also ==
- List of Puerto Ricans
- Guillermo Jose Torres
- Rafael Bracero
- Pedro Rosa Nales
- Efren Arroyo
- Jennifer Wolff
- Luis Antonio Cosme
- Maria Falcon
- Aníbal González Irizarry
- Junior Abrams
- Luis Francisco Ojeda
- Avelino Muñoz Stevenson
- Keylla Hernández
- Jorge Rivera Nieves
- Sylvia Gómez
