= List of television reporters =

The following is a list of television reporters.

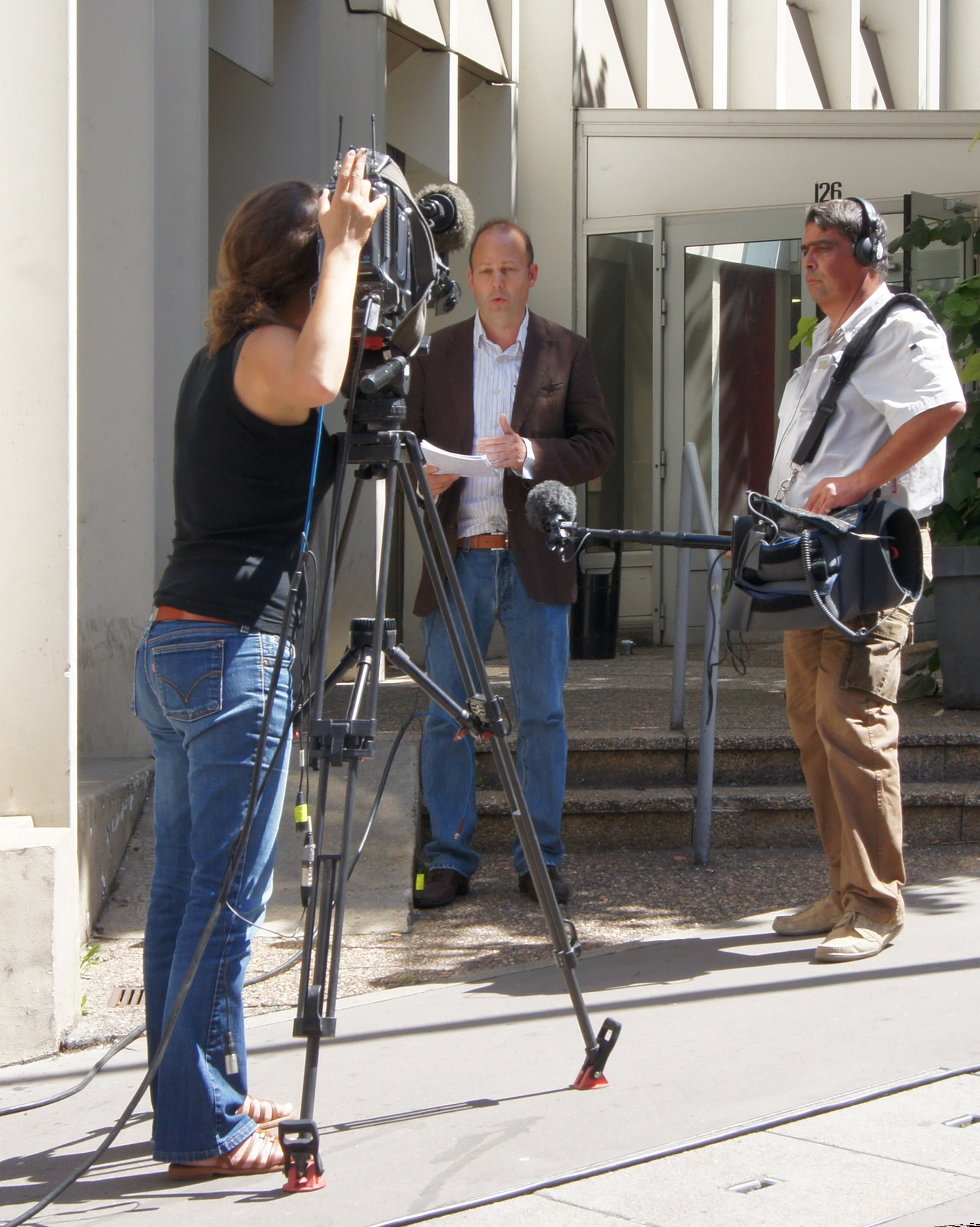
Television reporter and technicians at work in Paris, France

== Argentina ==
- Enrique Gratas
- Cristina Pérez

== Australia ==
- Liam Bartlett
- Tara Brown
- Richard Carleton
- Allison Langdon
- Ian Leslie
- Ray Martin
- George Negus
- Naomi Robson
- Jana Wendt
- Charles Wooley

== Brazil ==
- Glória Maria
- Ana Paula Padrão

== Canada ==
- Ian Hanomansing
- Lisa LaFlamme
- Peter Mansbridge
- Craig Oliver
- Sandie Rinaldo
- Lloyd Robertson

== India ==
- Arnab Goswami

== Japan ==
- Elina Arai

== Mexico ==
- Jorge Ramos
- Paola Rojas

== Pakistan ==
- Fawra Waheed - Aik News
- Waseem Badami - ARY News
- Mehar Bukhari - Dunya News
- Hamid Mir - Geo News
- Fatima Sherazi -Gtv

== Palestine ==
- Tareq Ayyoub
- Muhammad al-Qiq

== Philippines ==
- Atom Araullo - GMA Network
- Pia Arcangel - GMA Network
- Julius Babao - TV5 (Philippines)
- Aljo Bendijo - People's Television Network
- Doris Bigornia - ABS-CBN
- Dyan Castillejo - ABS-CBN
- Arnold Clavio - GMA Network
- Cheryl Cosim - TV5 (Philippines)
- Lia Cruz - TV5 (Philippines)
- Luchi Cruz-Valdes - TV5 (Philippines)
- Kara David - GMA Network
- Karen Davila - ABS-CBN
- Noli de Castro - ABS-CBN
- Lourd de Veyra - TV5 (Philippines)
- Alvin Elchico - ABS-CBN
- Mike Enriquez - GMA Network
- Susan Enriquez - GMA Network
- Ted Failon - Radyo5
- Rico Hizon - CNN Philippines
- Pia Hontiveros - CNN Philippines
- Jiggy Manicad - TV5 (Philippines)
- Rikki Mathay - Net 25
- Ivan Mayrina - GMA Network
- Solita Monsod - GMA Network
- Vicky Morales - GMA Network
- Henry Omaga-Diaz - ABS-CBN
- Renz Ongkiko - TV5 (Philippines)
- Ces Oreña-Drilon - CNN Philippines
- Maki Pulido - GMA Network
- Mark Salazar - GMA Network
- Korina Sanchez - ABS-CBN
- Alex Santos - Net 25
- Rhea Santos - GMA Network
- Bernadette Sembrano - ABS-CBN
- Howie Severino - GMA Network
- Connie Sison - GMA Network
- Jessica Soho - GMA Network
- Emil Sumangil - GMA Network
- Anthony Taberna - DZRH
- Mel Tiangco - GMA Network
- Emma Tiglao - Net 25
- Raffy Tima - GMA Network
- Erwin Tulfo - People's Television Network
- Raffy Tulfo - TV5 (Philippines)
- Mariz Umali - GMA Network
- Pinky Webb - CNN Philippines

== Poland ==
- Anna Czerwińska - Fakty TVN
- Renata Kijowska - Fakty TVN
- Andrzej Zaucha - Fakty TVN

== Puerto Rico ==
- Junior Abrams
- María Celeste Arrarás
- Efren Arroyo
- Bárbara Bermudo
- Giselle Blondet
- Rafael Bracero
- Elwood Cruz
- Enrique Cruz
- Dreuxilla Divine
- Carmen Dominicci
- Cyd Marie Fleming
- Jackie Guerrido
- Aníbal González Irizarry
- Carmen Jovet
- Evelio Otero
- John Ramos
- Pedro Rosa Nales
- Johanna Rosaly
- Rubén Sánchez
- Jorge Seijo
- Guillermo José Torres
- Ramón Enrique Torres
- Jennifer Wolff

== Russia ==
- Svetlana Pesotskaya

== Spain ==
- Letizia Ortiz, formerly on TVE

== Turkey ==
- Fatih Altaylı
- Mehmet Ali Birand
- Uğur Dündar
- Reha Muhtar

== United Kingdom ==
- Kate Adie
- Sameena Ali-Khan
- Mark Austin
- Lisa Aziz
- Zeinab Badawi
- Faye Barker
- Felicity Barr
- Seán Batty
- Martin Bell
- Andrea Benfield
- Sangeeta Bhabra
- Jennie Bond
- Frank Bough
- Jeremy Bowen
- Colin Brazier
- Fern Britton
- Fiona Bruce
- Lynda Bryans
- Michael Buerk
- Michael Crick
- Robin Day
- Jamie Delargy
- David Dimbleby
- Jonathan Dimbleby
- Richard Dimbleby
- Steve Dixon
- Sara Edwards
- Gavin Esler
- Anna Ford
- Juliette Foster
- David Frost
- Steve Gaisford
- Frank Gardner
- Kate Garraway
- Krishnan Guru-Murthy
- Vincent Hanna
- Brian Hanrahan
- Gordon Honeycombe
- John Humphrys
- Catherine Jacob
- Natasha Kaplinsky
- Kenneth Kendall
- Lucy Kite
- Sue Lawley
- Terry Lloyd
- Trevor McDonald
- Anne MacKenzie
- Paul Mason
- Daisy McAndrew
- Cliff Michelmore
- Guy Michelmore
- Dermot Murnaghan
- Shereen Nanjiani
- Joyce Ohajah
- Rageh Omaar
- Jeremy Paxman
- Julian Pettifer
- Barnaby Phillips
- Gaby Rado
- Sophie Raworth
- Seyi Rhodes
- Angela Rippon
- Fyfe Robertson
- Tim Sebastian
- John Sergeant
- Ben Shephard
- John Simpson
- Peter Sissons
- Jon Snow
- Peter Snow
- Julia Somerville
- Alastair Stewart
- Edward Stourton
- Moira Stuart
- John Suchet
- Mark Urban
- Jeremy Vine
- Kirsty Wark
- Justin Webb
- Charles Wheeler
- Alan Whicker
- Keith Wilkinson
- Nicholas Witchell
- Alastair Yates
- Kirsty Young

== United States ==
=== National newscasts ===
- Anderson Cooper
- Katie Couric
- Walter Cronkite
- John Donvan
- Hugh Downs
- Lisa Fletcher
- Major Garrett
- Jeff Glor
- Brit Hume
- Peter Jennings
- Chris Jury
- Greg Kelly
- Ted Koppel
- Steve Kroft
- Don Lemon
- Rick Leventhal
- Javed Malik
- Dave Malkoff
- Dave Marash
- Michel Martin
- Julie Chen Moonves
- Dan Patrick
- Scott Pelley
- Mari Ramos
- Dan Rather
- Birmania Rios
- Geraldo Rivera
- Diane Sawyer
- Bob Schieffer
- Carole Simpson
- Shepard Smith
- Lesley Stahl
- Charley Steiner
- George Stephanopoulos
- Hannah Storm
- John Stossel
- Ray Suarez
- Mike Wallace
- Barbara Walters
- Brian Williams
- John Yang

=== Local newscasts ===
- Cyndy Brucato
- Joel Connable
- Nancy Cox
- Jim Gardner
- Emily Gimmel
- Julius Hunter
- Jackie Hyland
- Nancy Loo
- Jackie Nespral
- Vicky Nguyen
- Kent Ninomiya
- Naibe Reynoso
- Kate Sullivan
- Dave Ward
- Marvin Zindler

== Uruguay ==
- Pedro Sevcec

== Venezuela ==
- Oscar Yanes

== See also ==
- Newscaster
