= Sylvia Gómez =

Puerto Rican television journalist and show host

- Born: San Juan, Puerto Rico
- Education: University of Michigan
- Occupation: Television journalist
- Spouse: Roberto
- Awards: Gold Circle Emmy Award (NATAS, Suncoast Chapter, 2022)

Sylvia Gómez is a Puerto Rican television journalist and show host. For 50 years, Gómez has been active on Puerto Rican television. She is best known as an anchorwoman for canal 2's television news show, Telenoticias en Accion, and for her investigative reporting on environmental issues. Gómez has also received recognition for her coverage of the environment from the Puerto Rico House of Representatives. In 2005, she was nominated for an Emmy award for the news series, Roosevelt Roads: La última frontera.

== Early life and education ==
Gómez earned her bachelor's degree in drama and English literature from the University of Puerto Rico and a master's degree in English literature from the University of Michigan in Ann Arbor.

== Career ==
Gómez began her career in 1972, as a young show host and producer at Puerto Rico's government channel, Canal 6. Gómez worked at a children's television show called Club 6. In 1975, Gómez became a newscaster at WKBM-TV canal 11, at the time a major television station in Puerto Rico.

During 1979, Gómez moved to canal 4, where she joined the cast of that station's news show, Noticentro 4. One year later, in 1980, Gómez moved to canal 4's main rival on Puerto Rican television, canal 2, also known as Telemundo.

Gomez has worked at Telemundo since, and, as of 2023, she had been employed by that network as an anchorwoman and television reporter for 43 years.

In 1996, Gómez filed an age discrimination lawsuit against Telemundo management. In 2022, Gómez sued Telemundo for alleged discrepancies in the salaries earned by women there and those earned by men. The journalist and the station reached an agreement early that year.

== Awards and recognition ==
In 2005, Gómez received an Emmy nomination in the news reporting series category for Roosevelt Roads: La última frontera (Telemundo). In 2006, she was recognized by the Association of Cardiologists of Puerto Rico as part of its "Mujer a Todo Corazón" awards.

In 2016, Gómez was awarded a grant by the Center for Investigative Journalism (CPI) to research and report on the factors hindering proper solid waste management and recycling in Puerto Rico. In 2017, the art exhibit "Aviario" by Jean Michel Fiedler at the SPACE Gallery in Guaynabo was dedicated to Gómez in recognition for her environmental reporting.

On June 12, 2022, Gómez was awarded a silver circle Emmy by the Suncoast Chapter of the National Academy of Television Arts and Sciences for her 50-year career on Puerto Rican television along with Cyd Marie Fleming, Luz Nereida Vélez and Eddie Miro. Over the course of her career, she has received recognition for her investigative reporting from the Overseas Press Club and the Association of Journalists of Puerto Rico on more than 15 occasions.

== Personal life ==
Gómez is married to a man named Roberto, and believes in God. She had back surgery in 2019 and was hospitalized in 2020 for injuries sustained during a fall in the hospital.

== See also ==
- List of Puerto Ricans
- Aníbal González Irizarry
- Pedro Rosa Nales
- Keylla Hernández
- Luis Francisco Ojeda
- Rafael Bracero
- Junior Abrams
- Luis Antonio Cosme
- Jennifer Wolff
- Guillermo José Torres
