= Telenoticias Puerto Rico =

Flagship daily television news program for WKAQ-TV

- Title card for the 4pm broadcast featuring the Telenoticias logo 2021-present
- Also known as: Hoy Dia Puerto Rico (Morning Broadcast); Telenoticias 11 A.M. (11 a.m. broadcast); Telenoticias 4 P.M. (4 p.m. broadcast); Telenoticias 5 P.M. (5 p.m. broadcast); Telenoticias 10 P.M. (Nighttime broadcast); Telenoticias Fin De Semana (Weekend broadcast)
- Genre: News program
- Created by: Angel Ramos
- Presented by: Hoy Día Puerto Rico: Grenda Rivera; 11 A.M. Edition: Grenda Rivera and Walter Soto León; 4 P.M. Edition: Ivonne Solla Cabrera and Julio Rivera Saniel; 5 P.M. Edition: Ivonne Solla Cabrera and Jorge Rivera Nieves; Nighttime Edition: Jorge Rivera Nieves and Zugey Lamela; Weekends: Soraida Asad Sánchez and Alberto Sánchez Laó
- Opening theme: "Noticiero Telemundo" by Paul Buckley Music
- Ending theme: Same as opening
- Country of origin: Puerto Rico
- Original language: Spanish

Production
- Executive producer: Dialma Santiago
- Production locations: Anibal Gonzalez Irizarry Studio at Telemundo de Puerto Rico, San Juan, Puerto Rico
- Camera setup: Multi-camera
- Running time: Hoy Día Puerto Rico: 120 minutes 11 A.M. Edition: 30 minutes 4 P.M. Edition: 90 minutes Nighttime Edition: 30 minutes Weekend Edition: 60 minutes
- Production company: Telemundo Puerto Rico

Original release
- Network: Telemundo Puerto Rico
- Release: March 28, 1954 – present

Related
- Hoy Dia Puerto Rico; NotiCentro; Las Noticias

Telenoticias Puerto Rico, more commonly known as just Telenoticias, is the flagship newscast for Telemundo owned-and-operated station WKAQ-TV in San Juan, Puerto Rico. It currently airs four editions on weekdays, a morning one anchored by Grenda Rivera, an 11 a.m. one anchored by Grenda Rivera and Walter Soto León, a 4 p.m. edition anchored by Ivonne Solla Cabrera and Julio Rivera Saniel, a 5 p.m. edition anchored by Jorge Rivera Nieves and Ivonne Solla Cabrera and a Nighttime newscast anchored by Jorge Rivera Nieves and Zugey Lamela which airs either at 10 p.m. or 11 p.m. depending on the day of the week. Additionally, Telenoticias airs two editions on weekends with the 5 p.m. newscast anchored by Soraida Asad Sanchez and Alberto Sánchez Laó. Sanchez Laó also anchors the weekend nighttime broadcast.

Telenoticias is the longest running program on Puerto Rican television and the first program ever broadcast over television airwaves on the island.

== History ==
=== Telenoticias del Mundo ===
In 1954, Angel Ramos contacted journalist Evelio Otero and informed him that he was able to receive news footage with no audio from an American distributor called TeleNews (when translated to Spanish: Telenoticias). The idea would be for Otero to present the footage Ramos obtained and narrate the news in Spanish and thus Telenoticias was born. Telenoticias was the first show broadcast on the WKAQ-TV airwaves on March 28, 1954. Through his work on Telenoticias, Otero became one of the most respected and well known figures in journalism in Puerto Rico. He remained the anchor of the newscast until 1962.

=== Telenoticias en Acción ===
During the 1970s, the format of the newscast was changed in part due to competition from other networks. In 1972, Telenoticias was rebranded to Telenoticias en Acción (Telenews in Action) and Aníbal González Irizarry joined as anchor of the newscast. The newscast kept the "En Acción" surname until the mid 80s when it reverted back to just Telenoticias. Through his work as anchor of Telenoticias, Irizarry also became a well known and respected journalist in Puerto Rico, he retired from the position in 1994 and was succeeded in the position by Jorge Rivera Nieves. As part of his legacy as anchor of the newscast, studio 6 at WKAQ-TV Studios (where Telenoticias broadcasts from) was given Irizarry's name.

=== Acquisitions and Change in Ownership ===
In 1983, Angel Ramos sold WKAQ-TV to John Blair & Co. which in turn was acquired by Reliance Group Holdings in 1987. The acquisition of WKAQ-TV and a number of other Spanish speaking stations in the mainland United States spearheaded the launch of the Telemundo national network and thus WKAQ-TV became a part of a station group. Although the Telemundo brand was adopted in the mainland United States as the name given to all the stations in the group, the name "Telenoticias" was not adopted by the newscasts airing on those stations.

On October 11, 2001, NBC (which itself would merge with Vivendi Universal a year-and-a-half later to become the present-day NBCUniversal) purchased Telemundo Communications Group from Sony and Liberty Media for $1.98 billion. The sale to NBC and the subsequent merger with Universal brought upon many cutbacks from the new parent company which affected Telenoticias. After the acquisition and merger, the weekend broadcasts of Telenoticias were canceled, followed by the 11 a.m. broadcast and finally the morning news block which included Telenoticias A.M. and Telemundo por la Mañana (Telemundo in the Morning) were canceled. At the end of the cutbacks, Telenoticias was airing two editions a day, one at 5 p.m. and one at 10 p.m. and over 70 employees lost their jobs in the news department.

=== Comcast acquisition and Telenoticias resurgence ===
In 2010, Comcast announced that it would acquire a 51 percent majority stake in NBC Universal for $6.5 billion; the deal was completed on January 28, 2011, with Comcast acquiring control of Telemundo as part of the deal.

As part of the Comcast acquisition the FCC required that NBC and Telemundo increased the hours of local programming and news programming on their owned and operated stations, thus the merger meant that Telenoticias would return to airing two editions on the weekends and weekdays at 11 a.m. The 11 a.m. newscast made its return on January 16, 2012, after a 6 year hiatus while the weekend newscast made its return on May 31, 2014, after an 8 year absence.

In February 2015, WKAQ-TV launched "Telemundo Responde" (Telemundo Answers), a consumer watchdog initiative that had been implemented in other Telemundo owned-and-operated stations in the mainland United States. Zugey Lamela would be in charge of investigating and reporting on cases that affected consumers in Puerto Rico.

=== Move to 4 p.m. ===
In order to better compete with rival WAPA-TV's newscast NotiCentro (which had moved its newscast to 4 p.m. and expanded it to an hour and half in 2019) WKAQ-TV announced that starting in January 2020, Telenoticias would start an hour early at 4 p.m. and would now have a duration of two hours. The first hour would be anchored by Zugey Lamela while the 5 p.m. would continue to be anchored by Ivonne Solla and Jorge Rivera Nieves (as it had for the past 24 years). Telenoticias 4 p.m. premiered on January 7, 2020.

On August 30, 2021, Walter Soto León joined Zugey Lamela as the new co-anchor of the 4 p.m. newscast. Soto León has been with WKAQ-TV since 2002 and is also married to Zugey Lamela thus making them the first married couple to anchor a newscast in Puerto Rico. Soto León remained on the position until 2024 when he moved to the 11 a.m. newscast while Zugey Lamela took a leave of absence for maternity time.

As part of its revamped 4 p.m. broadcast, Telenoticias added a variety of new segments. initially, Jay Fonseca provided political commentary and analysis before moving to WAPA-TV. Currently, Ángel Rosa provides political analysis and commentary through his segments "Las Cosas Como Son" (The things as they are) and "Así Piensa Angel Rosa" (This is what Angel Rosa Thinks). Additionally, Telenoticias presents a technology segment featuring Otto Oppenheimer (who moved from WAPA-TV in 2023)

On December 12, 2024, WKAQ-TV announces that Julio Rivera Saniel (formerly of WAPA-TV) will join the news team as the new co-anchor of the 4 p.m. newscast in early 2025. Rivera Saniel joined Lamela on the 4 p.m. broadcast on January 2, 2025 as part of Governor Jennifer Gonzalez's inauguration day coverage.

=== Hoy Día Puerto Rico ===
In December 2020, WKAQ announced that it would be relaunching its morning news operation for the first time since the cancellation of Telemundo Por La Mañana in 2006, with the launching of a new morning program set to debut in February 2021. The morning show, named Hoy Día Puerto Rico, would have a magazine-style format and air from 8 to 10 a.m. on weekdays. Ivonne Orsini and Ramón "Gatto" Gómez, who previously worked with rival station WAPA, were announced as the hosts on January 5, 2021, while former Senator Zoe Laboy joined the show for a political analysis segment. Grenda Rivera and Elizabeth Robaina were also announced to host a news segment and a weather/traffic segment, respectively.

The first broadcast of Hoy Día Puerto Rico was on February 15, 2021, live from the Sandra Zaiter Studio at WKAQ-TV. It featured a special interview with Puerto Rican Governor Pedro Pierluisi and the introduction of special contributors Desiree Lowry and Suzette Baco. On February 3, 2023, Ramón "Gatto" Gómez announced he would be leaving the show to cover the 2023 Baloncesto Superior Nacional basketball tournament as an analyst. Radio personality Jacky Fontánez was then announced as the show's new co-host. A few days later, another radio personality, Pamela Noa, joined the morning show as a third co-host.

On January 8, 2024, two new talents joined the show as hosts. Carlos McConnie and Jasond Calderón (who is also a cast member on the station's comedy show Raymond y sus Amigos) would now join Orsini, Fontánez and Noa as hosts of the show moving forward. The show also announced it would expand its run time later in the year adding a new hour of the show from 10 a.m. to 11 a.m.. The extra hour will be called Hoy Día Puerto Rico: 10 a.m. and it will have a different set of hosts from the original 8-10 a.m. version of the show.

=== Primera Pregunta con Rafael Lenin López ===
On January 31, 2023, WKAQ-TV announced that the station would be shortening the 5 p.m. edition of Telenoticias from one hour to a half hour to accommodate their new show Primera Pregunta con Rafael Lenín Lopez (First Question with Rafael Lenín Lopez). Hosted by Rafael Lenín Lopez, the show features political analysis, special interviews, and discussions of topics relevant to Puerto Ricans' daily lives. Special contributors to the show include PNP Senator Thomas Rivera Schatz, former Puerto Rican governor Alejandro García Padilla, Carlos Díaz Olivo, Luis Pabón Roca, and Anabelle Torres Colberg. Although produced by WKAQ's news department, the new show is considered a separate program from Telenoticias and airs from 5:30 to 6 p.m.

== Production ==
Telenoticias airs all of its editions live from Studio 6 at WKAQ-TV Studios in San Juan, Puerto Rico. Ever since the station was first sold in the 80s and became an affiliate of the national Telemundo brand, Telenoticias has used the logos and theme songs used on every other Telemundo owned and operated stations. In 2021, NBC Universal unveiled a uniform on screen identity for all of its owned and operated NBC and Telemundo stations called "Look S". Currently, Telenoticias uses the Look S production graphics and theme songs featuring slight updates to showcase the local stations identity. The opening for Telenoticias features a series of aerial shots of Old San Juan before showing the logo for the newscast. Meanwhile the on screen bug at the bottom of the screen features an animation of the national Telemundo logo and the local WKAQ-TV logo.

== On-air staff ==
=== Anchors ===
- Jorge Rivera Nieves, 5 p.m. and Nighttime edition (weekdays)
- Ivonne Solla Cabrera, 4 p.m. and 5 p.m.
- Zugey Lamela, Nighttime edition
- Walter Soto León, 11 a.m.
- Julio Rivera Saniel, 4 p.m.
- Grenda Rivera, Hoy Día Puerto Rico (mornings) and 11 a.m.
- Soraida Asad Sánchez, Weekends
- Alberto Sánchez Laó, Weekends

=== Weather ===
Weather anchors are referred to as La Autoridad en el Tiempo (The Weather Authority)

- Roberto Cortés
- Elizabeth Robaina
- Zamira Mendoza

=== Field Reporters ===
- Luis Guardiola
- Jeremy Ortiz Portalatín
- Orlando Rivera Martínez
- Ivette Sosa
- Luisa Sotero
- Glorinel Soto
- Marjorie Ramírez
- Dianerys Calderón
- Maribel Meléndez Fontán
- Kaly Esther Toro
- Wilenie Sepúlveda
- Naomi González Candelaria

=== Sports ===
- Ricardo Torres
- Ana Sofia Sánchez

=== Entertainment (Acceso Total) ===
- Lourdes Collazo
- Maria Del Carmen González

=== Primera Pregunta ===
- Rafael Lenín López

=== Collaborators ===
- Luis Pabón Roca, Reacción Inmediata
- Carlos Díaz Olivo, Reacción Inmediata
- Ángel Rosa, Las Cosas como Son
- Alejandro García Padilla, Primera Pregunta
- María de Lourdes Guzmán, Primera Pregunta
- Luis Dávila Pernas, Primera Pregunta
- Otto Oppenheimer, Ottotecnología
- Nino Correa, En Alerta

== Former on-air staff ==
- Evelio Otero (deceased)
- Anibal Gonzalez Irizarry (deceased)
- Ramón Enrique Torres (previously at WLII-DT and later at WMTJ and WTCV, deceased)
- Efren Arroyo (later at WAPA-TV, deceased)
- Raúl Quiñones (retired)
- José Esteves (retired)
- Sylvia Gómez (semiretired)
- Charito Fraticelli (retired)
- Johanna Rosaly (later at WIPR-TV)
- Junior Abrams (now at WAPA-TV)
- Hector Vazquez Muñiz (now as secretary of the Puerto Rico Department of Sports and Recreation)
- Bobby Angleró (now at WMTJ)
- Bruni Vélez (deceased)
- Jennifer Wolff (previously at WAPA-TV and later at WLII-DT, deceased)
- Myraida Chaves (later at WIPR-TV, deceased)
- Margarita Aponte (now at TeleOnce)
- Doris Torres Torregrosa (later at Centennial Puerto Rico)
- Jay Fonseca (now at WAPA-TV)
- Elliott Castro (deceased)
- Joe Bruno (now at Hipódromo Camarero)
- José Ángel Cordero (now at TeleOro)
- Miguel Ramos (now at WIPR-TV)
- Omar Matos (now at Periodico El Sol de Puerto Rico)
- Ricardo Currás (now at Punto Digital)
- Nuria Sebazco (now at TeleOnce)
- Tatiana Ortiz (later at WAPA-TV)
- Zoe Laboy (now at TeleOnce)
- Silverio Pérez (now at WAPA-TV)
