= Cyd Marie Fleming =

Puerto Rican television news journalist (born 1958)

- Born: 1958 (age 67–68)
- Occupation: Television journalist
- Spouse: Atilano Cordero Badillo
- Awards: Gold Circle Emmy Award (NATAS, Suncoast Chapter, 2022)

Cyd Marie Fleming (born 1958) is a Puerto Rican television news journalist. She was once an anchorwoman for a show alled Las Noticias on Tele-Once (channel 11), a major Puerto Rican television network.

== Career ==
Cyd Marie Fleming studied at the University of Franche-Comté in Besançon, France, and St. Leo College in Tampa, Florida, United States.

Fleming has been active in Puerto Rican television for many decades. In 1986, she was hired by TeleOnce to work as a newswoman there, during their evening and nightly news shows. From 1991 to 1997, Fleming was co-host of a show named Tu Mañana, also at TeleOnce, a channel that would later change its name to Univision Puerto Rico.

During 2013, Fleming was fired from Univision Puerto Rico.

For a short period during the 2010s, Fleming worked at canal 6, the Puerto Rican government's educational television channel.

Fleming returned to Univision Puerto Rico during 2021, as co-host of a show named Jugando Pelota Dura.

On June 12, 2022, Fleming, along with Sylvia Gómez, Luz Nereida Vélez and Eddie Miró (who received a gold circle Emmy Award for his more than 50 years in Puerto Rican television), was awarded a silver circle Emmy for her long trajectory on Puerto Rican television.

== Personal ==
Fleming is married to Puerto Rican businessman Atilano Cordero Badillo.

== See also ==
- List of Puerto Ricans
- Irish immigration to Puerto Rico
- Aníbal González Irizarry
- Pedro Rosa Nales
- Keylla Hernández
- Luis Francisco Ojeda
- Rafael Bracero
- Junior Abrams
- Luis Antonio Cosme
- Jennifer Wolff
- Guillermo José Torres
