= Efren Arroyo =

Puerto Rican journalist (1953–2021)

Angel Efren Arroyo (June 18, 1953 – September 2, 2021), better known as Efren Arroyo, was a Puerto Rican radio and television newscaster.

He was known as an investigative reporter for Televicentro de Puerto Rico's news show Noticentro 4, where he worked at for an aggregated 32 years. Arroyo also worked at Telemundo Puerto Rico's Telenoticias en Accion and was a reporter for El Reportero, a Puerto Rican newspaper. Arroyo worked as a television journalist for a total of 40 years.

== Biography ==
Arroyo was born in Santurce, San Juan, Puerto Rico. He was a resident of Río Piedras. Arroyo briefly studied acting, taking drama classes at the University of Puerto Rico, Rio Piedras Campus, under the tutelage of the noted actor, director, writer and acting teacher Dean Zayas. He was a member of an acting troupe that participated at various international acting competitions. In 1978, at the age of 25, he was hired by WKAQ-AM to work at their radio news department, before moving on to Televicentro Puerto Rico's (then known as WAPA-TV) television news show, Noticentro 4.

== Death ==
Arroyo, who was not vaccinated against COVID-19, was feeling unwell for two weeks before his death on September 2, 2021. An autopsy revealed he had died of the virus.

=== Reactions to his death ===
- Former governor of Puerto Rico Alejandro Garcia Padilla said, among other things, that "Efren Arroyo told stories the way they deserved to be told. Present and future generations have, in his reports, an important reference to complement written history and to have access to visuals that in other ways would be next to impossible for people to obtain".
- For his part, the current governor, Pedro Pierluisi, ordered flags to be flown at half mast for one day after learning of Arroyo's death. He declared that "Yesterday, we all found out about the death of a gentleman of journalism: Efren Arroyo. With his verbatim and way of presenting news, he is a man who has represented our historical memory and earned the respect and love of everyone who has, for more than 40 years, seen him through the small screen (of television)".
- Also, fellow newscaster and good friend Jorge Rivera Nieves made a dedication to Arroyo upon learning of his passing.

== See also ==
- List of Puerto Ricans
- Aníbal González Irizarry
- Avelino Muñoz Stevenson
- Keylla Hernández
- Luis Antonio Cosme
- Luis Francisco Ojeda
- Guillermo Jose Torres
- Rafael Bracero
- Jennifer Wolff
