= Jennifer Wolff =

Puerto Rican television journalist, show host and author (1960–2024)

Jennifer Wolff Conde (1960 – February 6, 2024) was a Puerto Rican television reporter, show host, company executive and writer. From 1981 to 1996, Wolff appeared on multiple Puerto Rican television news shows, becoming a celebrity in the island. She also wrote several published papers, including "¿Hacía Dónde Va el Sistema Eléctrico? Una Mirada de Contexto" ("Where is the Electric System Headed To? A Contextual Look"), "Europa: Qué Está en Juego con la Invasión Rusa" ("Europe: What's at Stake With the Russian Invasion"-of Ukraine) and "Desde Madrid: En el Radar Para el 2022" ("From Madrid: on the Radar for 2022"). Wolff also wrote a doctoral thesis, which she named "Isla Atlántica: Puerto Rico 1580–1636. Comercio de Contrabando y la Conformación del Espacio Atlántico en el Caribe Periférico" ("Island in the Atlantic Ocean: Puerto Rico 1580–1636. Contraband trade and the conformation of the Atlantic space in the peripheral Caribbean").

As a reporter Wolff covered news about different countries worldwide, such as Somalia, Kuwait, Cuba and Bolivia.

== Early life ==
Wolff graduated from the University of Puerto Rico with a PhD in history and from Duke University magna cum laude with a double B.A. in history and Latin American studies.

== Television news reporter career ==
Wolff was a television reporter in Puerto Rico for 14 years, beginning in late 1981 and finishing in 1996. Between 1981 and 1990, after leaving WLII, she appeared on WAPA-TV's daily news show, Noticentro 4. By 1993, Wolff had moved to WAPA's main rival, WKAQ-TV, where she hosted, alongside Myraida Chaves, a show named "Estudio 2".

Wolff was Director at The Center for a New Economy (CNE) Policy Bureau in Madrid, Spain. She was part of the CNE team in various roles, previously serving as Senior Program Director and as Director of Programs and Communications in CNE's office in San Juan.

== Personal life and death ==
Wolff resided in Madrid, Spain. She died after being diagnosed with metastatic cancer on February 6, 2024, at the age of 64.

== See also ==
- List of Puerto Ricans
- Pedro Rosa Nales
- Guillermo José Torres
- Luis Francisco Ojeda
- Luis Antonio Cosme
- Aníbal González Irizarry
- Efren Arroyo
- Rafael Bracero
- Junior Abrams
- Carmen Jovet
- Keylla Hernández
- Avelino Muñoz Stevenson
- "Kike" Cruz
- History of women in Puerto Rico
