= List of programs broadcast by TeleOnce =

TeleOnce is a Puerto Rican commercial broadcasting television network that launched in 1960. It is owned by the Liberman Media Group. After the station was acquired by Liberman Media Group in 2021, the new owners aimed to revive original programming on the station. Currently, TeleOnce airs 14 hours of original programming on weekdays and 3 hours of original programming on the weekends. Below is a list of programs currently broadcast on the network.

== Original programming ==
=== News programming ===
Title	Premiere	Runtime
Las Noticias	Original Run: May 27, 1986; Revival: June 12, 2021	60-120 min
En La Mañana	October 30, 2023	240 min

=== Talk shows ===
Title	Premiere	Runtime
El Poder Del Pueblo	October 31, 2022	90 min
Última Palabra con Lúgaro	March 10, 2025	30 min
Jugando Pelota Dura	2017	90 min
Nación Z	August 18, 2025	60 min
De la puerta pa' dentro	April 12, 2026	60 min

=== Variety shows ===
Title	Premiere	Runtime
P.R. En Vivo	October 10, 2022	120 min
En Familia con TeleOnce	September 29, 2025	60 min

=== Unscripted shows ===
Title	Premiere	Runtime
El Road Trip del Chef Sin Papeles	May 17, 2025	60 min

=== Reality ===
Title	Premiere	Runtime
Soy Boss	May 18, 2025	60 min
Boricuas Con Talento	April 21, 2026	60 min

=== Children's programming ===
Title	Premiere	Runtime
RockoLandia	April 26, 2025	30 min

== Current Programming ==
=== Las Noticias (1986–2014, 2021–present) ===
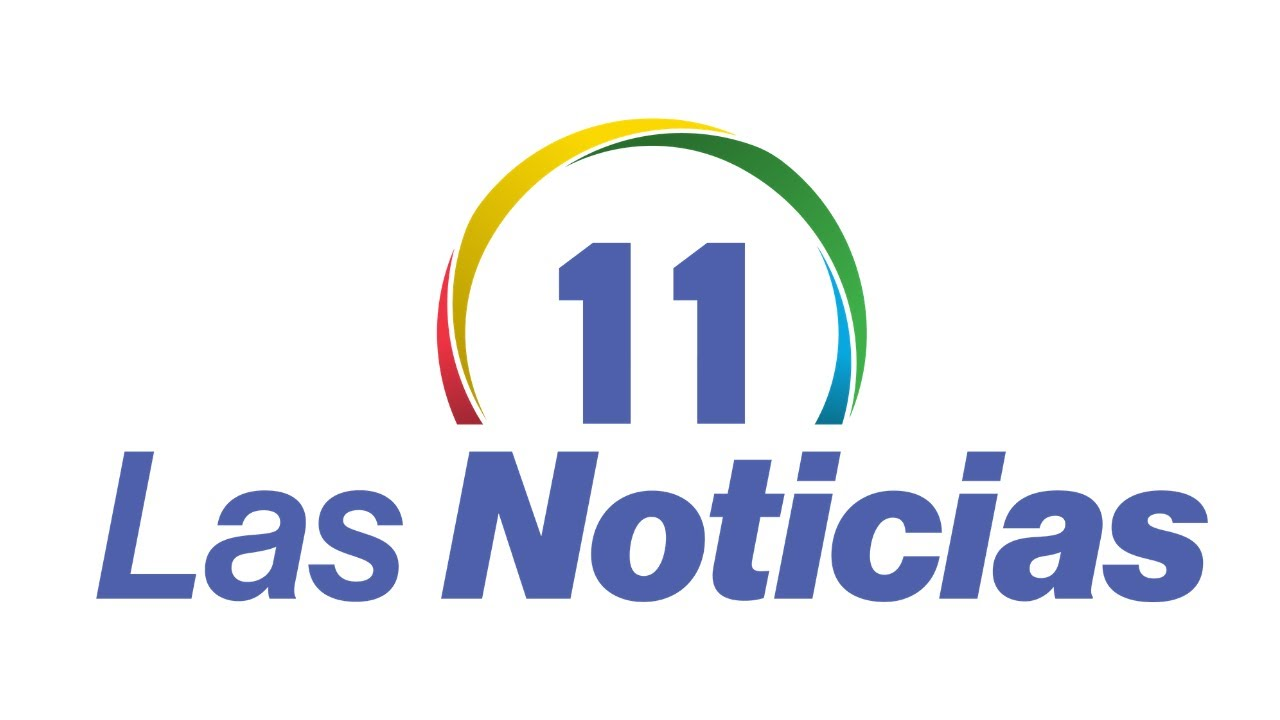
Current logo of Las Noticias

Las Noticias TeleOnce is the flagship news program for WLII and its repeater stations, it is currently anchored by Celimar Adames Casalduc during its afternoon editions, Maricarmen Ortiz, Manuel Crespo Feliciano and Nuria Sebazco during the day editions and Shirlyan Odette during its night edition.

The news program originated in 1986 and ran four editions weekdays and two on weekends until its abrupt cancellation in 2014 by Univision who decided to close the station's news department. In 2020, Univision sold TeleOnce to Liberman Media Group and the new ownership quickly reopened the station's news department and revived Las Noticias.

=== Tu Mañana/En La Mañana (1991–2014, 2023–present) ===
On March 11, 1991, a weekday morning news program, Tu Mañana, made its debut; the program was anchored by Carlos Ochoteco and Cyd Marie Fleming and featured segments such as panels of experts on different topics. Over the course of its history the program was hosted by Bruni Torres and Felipe Gomez, Nuria Sebazco and Elwood Cruz, and finally, Gricel Mamery and Gredmarie Colón. After the closure of the station's news department, Tu Mañana was canceled. The show's revival finally arrived in 2023 after Liberman Media Group's purchase of WLII from Univision. The new version of the show is called En La Mañana and it premiered on October 30, 2023.

=== Jugando Pelota Dura (2017–present) ===
In November 2017, it was announced that the political analysis show Jugando Pelota Dura would move to Univision Puerto Rico after initially premiering on NCN Television and Sistema TV. The show, hosted by radio personality and former PPD legislator Ferdinand Perez with a panel of journalists and political analysts discussing current events, began airing soon thereafter during the 6 p.m. spot, before bouncing around several timeslots on the station. Currently the program airs at 7 p.m. and features Alex Delgado from NotiUno, Cyd Marie Fleming and Margarita Aponte as contributors, both of whom were original reporters for Las Noticias prior to it shutting down in 2014.

On August 28, 2022, the show premiered its new special Sunday edition called Jugando Pelota Dura: Puerto Rico Habla ("Puerto Rico Speaks"). The show works as a town hall meeting where a live audience is welcomed and encouraged to ask questions on social problems and a panel of experts and local politicians is present to respond to these issues and offer solutions. The specials air once a month on Sundays in the show's usual time slot of 7 p.m. and take place from the channel's studios at The Mall of San Juan.

=== PR En Vivo (2022–present) ===
Following the cancellation of Acuestate con Francis in July 2022, it was clarified that although the show was ending, comedian Francis Rosas was still under contract with Liberman Media Group and that he was already working on his next project for the station. On September 16, 2022, it was announced on La Comay that the station planned to premiere a new midday show featuring Rosas alongside radio personality Deddie Romero as co-host. On September 27, the station confirmed that the show would be called PR En Vivo ("PR Live") and would air weekdays at 12:30 p.m. and have a half-hour duration. It premiered on October 10, 2022. The show features Rosas and Romero discussing a variety of lifestyle issues, news, and conducting interviews with guests. A biweekly (Mondays and Wednesdays) segment featuring PNP Representative Jorge "Georgie" Navarro will also give viewers the opportunity to call in and report local issues to be resolved by the politician.

On January 30, 2024, it was announced that PR En Vivo would now be an hour-long show starting February 12. With the extra half hour added, the show is now set to start at 11 a.m. and serve as a lead in for Las Noticias: Al Mediodía.

In January 2025, it was announced that PR En Vivo would once again change time slots and extend its run time. This time, the show would move to 1 p.m. and have a duration of two hours. The show was merged with the game show that aired at 12:30 p.m. (Pa Ganar y Reir con Teleonce) thus adding Wanda Sais and Luis "Finito" Fontanez to the show. The new version of the show premiered on January 13, 2025

=== El Poder del Pueblo (2022–present) ===
In January 2022, Gary Rodriguez signed an agreement with WLII to join the station's newscast Las Noticias and eventually develop his own show. On October 21, 2022, WLII-DT announced a new project titled El Poder Del Pueblo ("The People's Power"), which would focus on community issues affecting Puerto Ricans. Rodriguez would host the show and be joined by Jessica Serrano and Shalimar Rivera (who previously worked for the station on the canceled Ahora Es que Es). Additionally, the show would feature Ricardo Eladio Martínez (who previously worked on La Comay as a reporter), Carlisa Colón (making the jump from WKAQ-TV where she guest-hosted Alexandra a las 12), Rocky "The Kid", and professor Jorge Suárez Cáceres. The program premiered on October 31, 2022, at the 2:55 p.m. timeslot and served as a lead-in for Las Noticias. The addition of El Poder Del Pueblo increased WLII-DT's local programming production to 35 hours per week.

The program is filmed at the channel's studios in Guaynabo. It follows a panel show format wherein Rodriguez sets up a topic for Rivera, Gallart, and Colón to discuss while the audience can voice their own positions through on-screen polls. Jessica Serrano and Ricardo Eladio serve as on-field reporters covering news stories outside the studio. Additionally, the program features segments with collaborators such as Janet Parra, who served as a prosecutor for the Puerto Rico Justice Department and will be in charge of breaking down local crime stories and their subsequent court proceedings. Local politicians Jorge Suarez, Jorge Colberg, and Joanne Rodriguez Veve also feature as collaborators with occasional segments.

On January 17, 2023, Rocky "The Kid" announced he was leaving the show just three months after the premiere. Gallart cited burn out and wanting to spend more time with his family while announcing his decision on La Comay. Though other personalities have been filling Gallart's role, a permanent replacement has not been announced yet.

On November 1, 2023, just a day after the show's first anniversary, the show went through a major change of its presenters. Carlisa Colón announced she was leaving the show to go back to WKAQ-TV and Shalimar Rivera was relieved of her duties by the production. Former senator and political commentator Zoe Laboy would make the jump from WKAQ-TV to join El Poder del Pueblo as a result of these changes, her first episode aired on November 6, 2023.

=== Última Palabra con Lúgaro (2025-present) ===
On February 2, 2025, news outlets reported TeleOnce was developing a new political analysis talk show that would occupy the 5:55 p.m. time slot left empty by La Comay. The show would be called Última Palabra (Last Word) and would be hosted by former gubernatorial candidate Alexandra Lúgaro. The show was made official during a press conference held on February 26, 2025, where Lúgaro was presented as the host of the show and it was announced that Ferdinand Pérez (of Jugando Pelota Dura) would be producing the show. Última Palabra premiered March 10, 2025.

=== El Road Trip Del Chef Sin Papeles (2025-present) ===
In May 2025, the station announced it would be adding more local programming during the weekends with the introduction on El Road Trip del Chef Sin Papeles. This unscripted show follows Gary Rodriguez (El Poder Del Pueblo) as he visits different restaurants through Puerto Rico, samples their food and talks to the chef and staff about the menu. The show premiered on Saturday, May 17, 2025 at 2:00 p.m.

=== Soy Boss (2025-present) ===
As part of an initiative to introduce more local programming on weekends, TeleOnce announced the debut of a new show called Soy Boss (I'm Boss). The show is a reality competition in which children from Puerto Rican schools present their entrepenuirship projects to a panel of judges that will pick the best proposal to move on to the next round. The winner will receive a cash prize and equipment to start their business. Soy Boss premiered on May 18, 2025 at 2:00 p.m.

=== RockoLandia (2025-2025) ===
In April 2025, TeleOnce announced they would be the first to broadcast the musical animated series in Spanish titled RockoLandia. The 10 episode animated series presents the story of a family of sheep and features voices by Joaquin Jarque, René Monclova and Camila Monclova. The show premiered on Saturday, April 26, 2025 at 8:30 a.m. and aired on weekends for three months.

=== En Familia con TeleOnce (2025 - present) ===
On September 23, 2025, TeleOnce announced their new production for the daytime block. The new show would be called En Familia con TeleOnce (Among Family with TeleOnce). The show will be hosted by Yan Ruiz, Brenda Rivera and Laihany Pontón and will air live weekdays att 11:30 a.m.

The program will present a mix of entertainment, information and community outreach and will feature interventions from Las Noticias covering the days' most important stories. Additionally, Sonia Valentin will present her El Calentón segment (which previously was featured in En La Mañana) live from the radio booth at Radio Isla 1320 where she interviews political figures and discusses hot topics.

En Familia con TeleOnce is set to premiere on September 29, 2025.

=== Boricuas con Talento (2026-present) ===
On March 11, 2026, Liberman Media Group announced it would be developing their first reality show Boricuas Con Talento (Boricuas with Talent). The show, which premiered on April 21, 2026, follows the format of America's Got Talent and features performers from all kinds of talents presenting their skills to the a judging panel composed of music producer, José "Pompi" Vallejo, singer Yaire and comedian Keropi Sánchez who decide if they move on to the next round. The first season of the show saw over 900 contestants audition and generated over 1.7 million votes from the audience to determine the winner. The winner of the first season was won by singer and performer "Machito Swing", a second season has already been confirmed.
