= Enrique Cruz =

Enrique Cruz may refer to:

- Enrique Cruz (journalist) (born 1952), Puerto Rican television journalist
- Enrique Cruz (baseball) (born 1981), Dominican baseball player
- Enrique Cruz Jr. (born 2003), American football player
