= Dreuxilla Divine =

Puerto Rican actress

- Born: Nelson Roldán; January 12, 1974 (age 52); Río Piedras, Puerto Rico
- Education: Universidad del Sagrado Corazón
- Occupations: Television actor, Drag queen

Dreuxilla Divine Carter (born Nelson Roldán; January 12, 1974) is a Puerto Rican drag queen character on television. Divine has gained major popularity as a drag performer both in Puerto Rico and eastern United States cities such as New York and Miami. She is also a comedian, a pageant host and a fashion critic.

Divine has been featured in various television related articles and covers of several show-biz magazines, such as: Vea, Teve Guía, Colony Magazine, and in a centerfold of daily newspaper Primera Hora.

Dreuxilla was the host of a daily television variety show, opposite Puerto Rican journalist Milly Cangiano, titled: Sacando Chispas (Extracting Sparks), created by Puerto Rican television producer Luisito Vigoreaux and broadcast by Televicentro in Puerto Rico and cable network WAPA America located in Springfield, Massachusetts throughout the United States. It was broadcast live in the afternoon, and repeated on tape, late night. It has been acknowledged by television audiences nationwide and internationally. As of December 31, 2008, Dreuxilla was unemployed. However, Divine is known to often make appearances in TV shows and interviews, as well as being the occasional host of parties, awards, and the like.

From July 12–15, 2007, Dreuxilla was one of the star MC's of the yearly event Las Fiestas de la Bahía, (The Bay Parties) in Old San Juan, Puerto Rico.

As of 2013, she was co-hosting the popular television show Pegate al Medio Dia.

In June 2022, Dreuxilla was honored by Orgullo Boquerón for "her extensive career in the media".

In 2023, Dreuxilla started a new show called "Bohemia para las Madres".

== See also ==
- List of television presenters/P.R.
- List of television reporters/P.R.
- List of talk show hosts/Letter D
