= José Ésteves (reporter) =

Puerto Rican television journalist

- Born: José Ésteves Montesino
- Years active: 1980s–2025
- Known for: Television reporter (NotiCentro, Telenoticias en Accion)

José Ésteves is a Puerto Rican television reporter for Telemundo Puerto Rico, canal 2. He worked for many years on the canal 4 news television show, Noticentro 4, where he was news sub-director and chief-in-command of their information table, leading such other reporters as Efren Arroyo.

He worked also alongside Ramon Enrique Torres, among others.

== Professional career ==
Ésteves graduated from the University of Puerto Rico school with a master's degree in social sciences. In the early 1980s, he got hired by canal 11, to work on that station's show, "El Once en Las Noticias" ("News at Channel Eleven"). Canal 11 soon went bankrupt, and in 1982, Ésteves was hired by WAPA-TV.

In 1992, Ésteves joined Telemundo canal 2's news show, "Telenoticias en Accion" ("Telenews in Action").

== Humanitarian causes ==
During 2019, Ésteves formed part of a group of people that took humanitarian help to Venezuela. He said, during an interview published by the Puerto Rican version of international newspaper Metro that the group had a harrowing trip by sea that included stops in Tortola and Bonaire before arriving in South America. "The hardest (part) was the trip to get there. We left (Puerto Rico) on Wednesday midday and got to Tortola that night and from there, we changed boats. From there on (we were on) open seas. (It was) A very strong, very brave sea. We were on a small boat (which) moved from side to side. When (the water) hit one side of the boat, the splash of the waves went over the cargo boxes, and when they hit the front of the boat, they got to the captain. They were two hard days (at sea). Everyone was dizzy, (and) vomiting, (including) the mariners", he declared on that interview, conducted by Dagmar Rivera and Raymond Arrieta.

== Emmy award ==
During 2022, Ésteves was awarded a Silver Circle Emmy award, for his 40 years working non-stop as a television reporter on Puerto Rican television. He has been working as a television reporter without interruption since 1982.

== See also ==
- List of Puerto Ricans
