= Todo Queda en Familia =

Todo Queda en Familia or Todo queda en familia may refer to:

- "Todo Queda en Familia" (El Chapulín Colorado), an episode of the fifth season of El Chapulín Colorado, which is a crossover with the series El Chavo del Ocho
- Al final todo queda en familia, a 2018 Puerto Rican game show broadcast by TeleOnce
- Todo queda en familia, the Spanish title of the 2022 British drama television series Riches
- "Todo queda en familia", an episode of the 2018 American television series Descontrol
- "Todo queda en familia", an episode of the 2023 Mexican television series Dra. Lucía, un don extraordinario
