= Atilano Cordero Badillo =

Puerto Rican businessman

Atilano Cordero Badillo (born c. 1944 in Moca, Puerto Rico) is a Puerto Rican entrepreneur and supermarket owner.

== Career ==
In 1967 he founded Supermercados Grande where he remains as president and he is also President of Empresas Cordero Badillo. Cordero Badillo has developed Food Price stores in Puerto Rico which are based on the warehouse model of food sales. Cordero Badillo is President of the Chamber of the Food Marketing & Distribution Industry (MIDA) Through his career he has won numerous awards, and he belongs to the Top Business Leaders association of Puerto Rico's Hall of Fame. He was named president of that organization from 1986 to 1990.

== Personal ==
Cordero Badillo is married to Puerto Rican television news anchorwoman Cyd Marie Fleming.

== See also ==
- List of Puerto Ricans
