= WAPA-TV =

Television station in San Juan, Puerto Rico

WAPA-TV and WTIN-TV

WAPA-TV: San Juan; WTIN-TV: Ponce; Puerto Rico
- Channels for WAPA-TV: Digital: 27 (UHF); Virtual: 4
- Channels for WTIN-TV: Digital: 14 (UHF); Virtual: 2, 4
- Branding: WAPA; NotiCentro (newscasts)

Programming
- Affiliations: WTIN-TV: 2.11: Telemundo; 2.21: Punto 2; Both stations: 4.1: Independent; 4.2: WAPA Deportes; 4.3: WAPA 4.3

Ownership
- Owner: WAPA Media Group; (Televicentro of Puerto Rico, LLC)
- Sister stations: WKAQ, WKAQ-FM, WYEL, WNJX-TV

History
- First air date: WAPA-TV: May 1, 1954; WTIN-TV: 1970
- Former channel number: WAPA-TV: Analog: 4 (VHF, 1954–2009); WTIN-TV: Analog: 14 (UHF, 1985–2009); Digital: 15 (UHF, 2004–2018)
- Former affiliations: WAPA-TV: All secondary: ABC; CMQ; DuMont; NBC; (1954–early 1960s); Univision; (1988–2002); WTIN-TV: Telemundo (1970–1972); NBC (satellite of WSJU-TV, 1985–1987); ABC (satellite of WPRV-TV, 1987–1989); Fox (satellite of WPRV-TV, 1989–1992); Independent station (1992–1994)
- Call sign meaning: WAPA-TV: Station was founded by the Asociación de Productores de Azúcar (Puerto Rico Sugar Grower's Association)

Technical information
- Licensing authority: FCC
- Facility ID: WAPA-TV: 52073; WTIN-TV: 26681
- ERP: WAPA-TV: 1,000 kW; WTIN-TV: 750 kW
- HAAT: WAPA-TV: 765 m (2,510 ft); WTIN-TV: 853 m (2,799 ft)
- Transmitter coordinates: WAPA-TV: 18°6′47.5″N 66°3′9.3″W; WTIN-TV: 18°10′04.0″N 66°34′37.0″W
- Translator: WNJX-TV 31 Mayagüez

Links
- Public license information: WAPA-TV: Public file; LMS; WTIN-TV: Public file; LMS
- Website: wapa.tv (in Spanish)

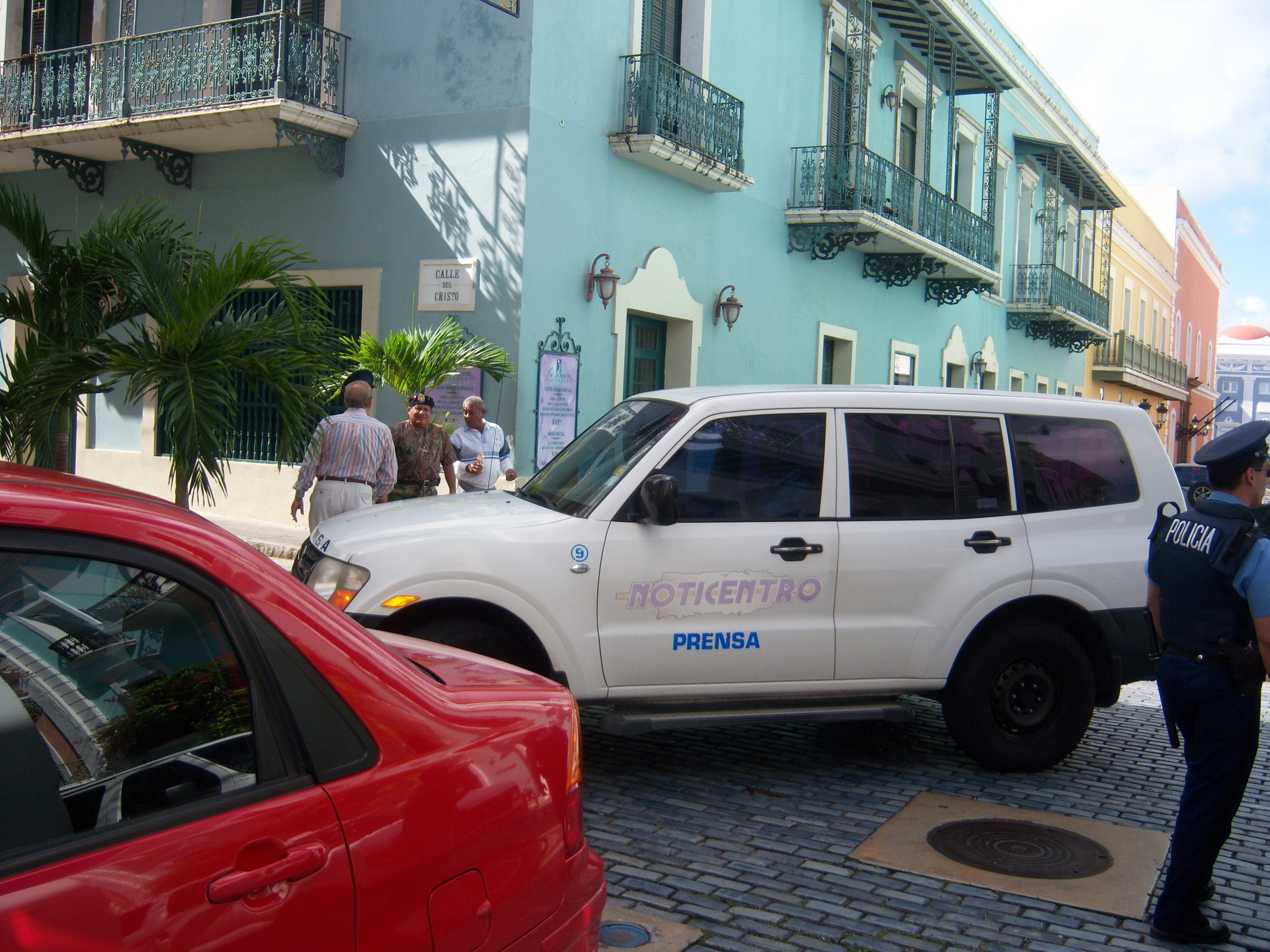
Noticentro in Old San Juan, Puerto Rico

WAPA-TV (channel 4) is a Spanish-language independent television station in San Juan, Puerto Rico. It is the flagship and namesake station of Guaynabo-based WAPA Media Group.

WAPA-TV maintains studio facilities on Avenida Luis Vigoreaux in Guaynabo; its transmitter is located on the WKAQ-TV (channel 2) transmission tower at Cerro La Santa in Cayey near the Carite State Forest. WAPA-TV is the most watched television station in Puerto Rico.

The station's signal is relayed across Puerto Rico through two full-power satellite stations: WTIN-TV (digital channel 14, virtual channel 4) in Ponce and WNJX-TV (digital channel 31, virtual channel 4) in Mayagüez. WTIN-TV also broadcasts two subchannels simulcast from WKAQ-TV, including its Telemundo programming, using virtual channels 2.11 and 2.21.

== History ==
WAPA-TV began broadcasting on May 1, 1954, as the second television station to be licensed to Puerto Rico. Its callsign is a partial abbreviation of the station's original owners, the now-defunct Asociación de Productores de Azúcar, or Puerto Rico Sugar Grower's Association. During its earliest years, the station was affiliated with NBC, ABC, DuMont, and the CMQ Television Network. During the late 1960s, WAPA-TV relocated to a larger facility at Garden Hills in Guaynabo. The architectural planning of the new building received a recognition in the "commercial design" category of the Institute of Puerto Rican Culture (ICP) awards.

WAPA-TV's "Open 4" logo in a 1980 newspaper advertisement for Decisión '80. The "Open 4" logo in this ad was used from 1968 to 1986, and again from 1996 to 1998.

The station was the first in the U.S. territory to transition to color unceremoniously in 1966, followed by WKAQ-TV in 1968. Popularly known in Puerto Rico by its assigned channel number, Canal Cuatro, the station was also known by its animated cartoon mascot during the 1970s and 1980s, a bongo-playing cat (known commonly as el gato de WAPA in Spanish) and therefore its slogan was Por el cuatro como el gato (colloquially "on four (legs) like the cat"), which rhymes in its original Spanish. Similarly, another station promo used the phrase, Hasta el gato, te-ve el cuatro and the cat itself was alternately known as el Gato de Cuatro.

Like other mascots, El Gato was seen in different situations in different on-air promos. Besides playing the bongos, he would also play the drums and was seen in one station ID as a matador. Another promo had him interacting with a cat seen in a Telemundo ad. El Gato would also sometimes be accompanied by his wife and children (one boy and one girl), where they appeared flying in a helicopter shaped like the channel's "4" logo and celebrated the holidays while playing musical instruments.

WAPA-TV's competitors include WKAQ-TV (Telemundo), WLII (Univision affiliate station Teleonce) and PBS member station WIPR-TV. WAPA-TV and WKAQ-TV have battled for the title of Puerto Rico's most-watched television station since the 1950s, with WLII entering the battle in the mid-1980s.

During the 1980s and early 1990s, the station became very successful by mixing American shows translated to Spanish with locally produced sitcoms such as Cuqui, Cara o Cruz, Entrando por la Cocina, Carmelo y Punto and Barrio Cuatro Calles. However, it still trailed behind WKAQ-TV as the second most-watched Puerto Rican station. In the early 1990s, WAPA rebranded itself with the slogans WAPA'lla! (a catchy slang variation of Vamos pa'lla, or "Let's go!") and WAPA, aqui con la gente ("WAPA, here with the people"). These slogans were accompanied by a catchy musical score and vivid, colorful graphics depicting the channel's logo. In 1994, WAPA was the first television station in Puerto Rico to use high-end graphic animations to animate a new logo, created and animated by Pixel Light Studios of New York City. This gave the station a very "American" on-air appearance. The logo, although graphically pleasing, was slowly dropped in favor of the classical number 4 logo. High end graphics were later dropped altogether for cheaper, in-house graphics.

In 1997, under the helm of former Univision executive Miguel Banojian, WAPA-TV achieved its biggest increases in viewership ever. During Banojian's tenure, the network produced more local programming than ever before, increasing its local news programming, and broadcasting several sporting events including Serie del Caribe (the Caribbean edition of the U.S. baseball World Series) and World Boxing Championship events produced in partnership (since the early 1980s) with Don King (WAPA would also sometimes broadcast fights promoted by King's rival Bob Arum and other promoters like Bob Andreoli).

In 1998, WAPA again rebranded itself with a new name and logo; Televicentro (a brand that was used previously during the 1970s and 1980s). It also regained its position as a major Puerto Rican television station, mainly due to its new focus on locally produced programming. Its new slogan, Como tú, boricua ("Like you, Boricua"—a nod to the longtime colloquial nickname for Puerto Ricans) highlighted its status as the only locally programmed commercial station remaining in Puerto Rico. Despite the new name, local residents still referred to the station as either el cuatro or simply "WAPA". That same year, former WKAQ-TV general manager Joe Ramos was named president of WAPA-TV.

In September 2004, WAPA-TV became the first Puerto Rican station, and the seventh television station in the U.S. (including territories) to become a satellite-distributed superstation. WAPA America can be seen in the U.S. mainland through DirecTV and Dish Network, and on various cable television providers including Xfinity, Spectrum, Verizon FiOS and Optimum, but this is not the first time WAPA-TV has had any presence in the United States. In 1968, WAPA-TV had WNJU-TV (Channel 47) not only as its sister station but also as its affiliate, predating WAPA America by decades. WNJU-TV was owned by Screen Gems before selling it in 1984 to a consortium that would launch the NetSpan network, later evolving into Telemundo.

On October 19, 2006. LIN TV announced that it had entered into an agreement to sell its Puerto Rico television operations to InterMedia Partners for $130 million in cash. The sale was completed on March 30, 2007.

On December 17, 2007, the station changed its branding from Televicentro to wapa, in all lowercase letters. Following the rebrand, the station began developing a new format, changing its jingle and redesigning their website. WAPA-TV signed an agreement with Miss Puerto Rico Universe to produce a reality show titled Por la corona, which debuted on August 15, 2008, where the public is able to select which five of the participants move directly to the pageant's semifinal via text messaging votes.

On January 23, 2013, InterMedia Partners announced that it would merge WAPA-TV and WAPA America, along with its stake in Cinelatino, with the shell corporation Azteca Acquisition Corporation (which is not associated with the Mexican-based Azteca group or the Azteca América network) to form Hemisphere Media Group. 73% of the new company is owned by InterMedia.

On December 1, 2017, WAPA-TV named Javier Maynulet Montilla as president and general manager, succeeding Ramos, who spent 20 years at the station until his retirement on April 27, 2018.

On November 9, 2020, WAPA-TV named Jorge Hidalgo as president and general manager of the station effective January 1, 2021, after Javier Maynulet left the station after two years. Hidalgo currently serves as a Senior Vice President of Operations for Hemisphere Media Group.

=== WAPA Orlando ===
On December 11, 2025, during WAPA Media's upfront presentation, it was announced that WAPA had reached an agreement with Entravision Communications to bring the WAPA brand as a local over-the-air channel in Central Florida named WAPA Orlando. WAPA Orlando officially launched on-air on February 6, 2026, broadcasting through WOTF-TV and featuring all the local programming produced in Puerto Rico while boasting the creation of a local NotiCentro newscast focused on Central Florida which will also be produced from WAPA Headquarters in Puerto Rico. Although the station is now affiliated to WAPA Media Group, Entravision will continue operating the station and will be in charge of its digital strategy (social media, online presence) independent of WAPA Media.

=== Outages ===
On December 3, 2015, WAPA-TV along with WIPR-TV went off-air, due to a transmitter outage at Cerro La Santa in Cayey. The station was still watchable on Liberty, Dish Network, DirecTV and Claro TV. The transmitter was repaired and placed back on air on December 10, 2015. Repairs were made by WAPA's engineering department.

On September 20, 2017, the main transmission tower of WAPA-TV was destroyed during Hurricane Maria. This caused the station to be off-air for two days until they began transmitting through Univision-owned stations WSTE-DT (until October 30) and WLII-DT (until November 17; which was owned by Univision at the time) from their transmitter in Aguas Buenas. Since November 18, the station then began transmitting its main programming (virtual channel 4.1) through station WKAQ-TV and WAPA Deportes (4.2) through WIPR-TV.

On October 28, 2018, one year after going dark, WAPA-TV returned to the air from its new transmitter installed at the WKAQ-TV tower location, broadcasting with High Quality Doble Data HD. Repairs caused by the old transmitter equipment were made by the engineering department.

=== DirecTV-WAPA carriage dispute ===
On May 4, 2018, Hemisphere Media Group became involved in a retransmission consent dispute with DirecTV, resulting in WAPA-TV's removal from DirecTV's Puerto Rico channel lineup. The station was restored on June 14, 2018, after the two sides came to a new agreement.

=== Dish-WAPA carriage dispute ===
On October 24, 2019, at 7 p.m., Hemisphere Media Group became involved in a retransmission consent dispute with Dish Network, resulting in WAPA-TV's removal from Dish's Puerto Rico channel lineup. The station was restored on December 17, 2019, after the two sides came to a new agreement.

== Programming ==
=== NotiCentro ===
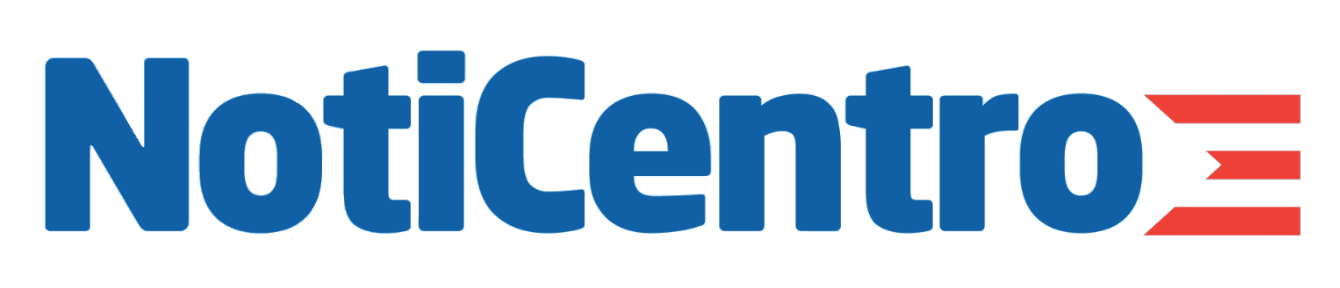
The current logo of NotiCentro

NotiCentro (a Spanish translation of NewsCenter) is the name of WAPA-TV's news division; the station presently broadcasts 44 hours of locally produced newscasts each week (with eight hours each weekday and two hours each on Saturdays and Sundays). The news operation began in 1967 with Cuban-born Evelio Otero as the sole anchorman for the 6 p.m. newscast. Soon after, Carlos Ruben Ortiz joined the news staff for the 6 p.m. broadcast. Otero remained alone on camera, until his departure from WAPA in 1980 to take the senior editor position at the Voice of America in Washington. Ortiz shared the anchor slot at 6 p.m. with then newcomer Guillermo José Torres, a former radio announcer born in Juana Diaz who has since become the longest standing news anchor on the island, with a career spanning 43 years (Torres retired on August 5, 2013). The format predated the NewsCenter format which became popular on NBC affiliates in the 1970s.

In its beginnings, NotiCentro 4 ran for only fifteen minutes in the afternoon, with a half-hour edition at 10 p.m.; there was also a weekend edition. Eventually, the program's running time was increased to a full hour. After Otero's departure, New York City–born William "Bill" Pérez became WAPA's news director (Torres held the post for a while, but eventually asked to serve only as a news anchor). In the late 1970s, Enrique Cruz, Luz Nereida Vélez, Sylvia Gómez, Luis Rigual, Cyd Marie Fleming, José Ésteves, Luis Francisco Ojeda and others joined the news department.

In 1980, NotiCentro 4 inaugurated a new studio. In 1981, Pedro Rosa Nales joined the team. In 1982, Enrique Cruz, also known as "Kike Cruz", replaced Torres as show director. In 1983, Rigual died, and was replaced as main sports anchor by Rafael Bracero. Bobby Angleró joined the team of reporters as Bracero's main helper in 1983, the same year that the Coquí Satellite was inaugurated by the station. Coquí Satellite helped the station deliver breaking news quicker, and helped deliver the news on occasions such as the Challenger explosion, when Torres interrupted Ángela Meyer on her "Chanita Gobernadora" comedy segment to break the news to the public only minutes after it had happened.

In the early 2000s, WAPA-TV began using a helicopter for newsgathering called SuperCóptero ("SuperChopper"). The SuperCóptero had mostly been used to report on traffic conditions in the metropolitan area on the 4 and 5 p.m. newscasts. WAPA-TV was the only local station to have a helicopter, but regular use of the SuperCóptero was soon discontinued due to budget cuts; WAPA now only uses the helicopter for special events such as elections and breaking news coverage.

NotiCentro ran a local cable channel, WAPA Tiempo, which featured weather forecasts for Puerto Rico 24 hours a day. Originally named El Canal del Tiempo (its name changed to avoid confusion with The Weather Channel cable network), it could be seen on all three cable companies then serving Puerto Rico at the time (OneLink Communications, Choice Cable TV, and Liberty Puerto Rico; all of them now merged as the latter); it was also broadcast on WAPA-TV digital subchannel 4.3. WAPA Tiempo was discontinued on September 1, 2012, due to WAPA Deportes (subchannel 4.2) upgrading to Full HD resolution to broadcast MLB postseason games; the channel was also dropped from Liberty cable.

WAPA-TV uses the same logo for NotiCentro (formerly NotiCentro 4), only changing the word WAPA to NotiCentro. The music package previously used for the newscast was "News Authority" by 615 Music and has been used since 2004. In the past, the station used "WNDU 1986 News Theme", "Turn to News", "Newswatch 24", "News One" and "Impact" among others. NotiCentro now uses the same music for all its segments and bumpers except for its news résumé En Una Semana ("In One Week"), which used the NotiCentro 4 graphics and music package from 1999 but now uses the current graphics and music package. Since 2012, WAPA-TV uses the "Truth" music package by 615 Music with "Truth V1" from 2012 to 2017, and "Truth V2" since 2017 for all newscasts.

On May 20, 2019, NotiCentro expanded to 1 1/2 hours beginning at 4 p.m., renaming itself as NotiCentro Edición Estelar, with Normando Valentín serving as an anchor for the early evening newscast. Valentín has been with the station since 2003, and was morning anchor from 2008 to 2019. On February 3, 2020, Katiria Soto returns to WAPA-TV after five years working at WXTV-DT in New York, this time as a co-anchor of the 4 p.m. newscast.

==== Notable current on-air news staff ====
- Juan Dalmau – political analyst
- Jay Fonseca – general assignment reporter/analyst
- Luz Nereida Vélez – health reporter

==== Local program hosts ====
- Angelique Burgos – Pégate al Mediodia
- Melwin Cedeño – Pégate al Mediodía
- Sunshine Logroño – Pégate al Mediodía (producer)
- Jaime Mayol – Viva la Tarde
- José Vega Santana Remi – Collaborator at Noticentro al Amanecer

==== Notable former on-air staff ====
- Raymond Arrieta – comedian & host
- Junior Abrams - sports anchor & host
- Efren Arroyo – investigative reporter and historian
- Rafael Bracero – sports anchor
- Josue Carrion
- Jailene Cintrón – host
- Gredmarie Colón
- Sonya Cortes
- Alba Nydia Díaz – actress
- Carlos Díaz Olivo – political analyst
- Cyd Marie Fleming – anchor/reporter
- Roque Gallart
- Juan Manuel García Passalacqua – investigative reporter
- Sylvia Gómez – anchor/reporter
- Keylla Hernández – anchor and reporter
- Rafael José – host and singer
- Carmen Jovet – reporter
- Zoe Laboy – political analyst
- Alexandra Lugaro – political analyst
- Topy Mamery
- Hector Marcano – producer and host at El Super Show
- Ada Monzón – first female Puerto Rican meteorologist
- Pedro Rosa Nales – anchor and reporter
- Luis Francisco Ojeda – investigative reporter
- Ivonne Orsini
- Marian Pabón – comedian
- Tommy Ramos
- Gary Rodríguez
- Johnny Ray Rodriguez – comedian
- Ángel Rosa – political analyst
- Rubén Sánchez
- Kobbo Santarrosa
- Guillermo José Torres – anchorman
- Hector Travieso
- Jennifer Wolff – anchor/reporter

== Technical information ==
=== Subchannels ===
The station's signal is multiplexed:

Subchannels of WAPA-TV
Subchannel	Res.	Short name	Programming
4.1	1080i	WAPA-HD	Main WAPA-TV programming
4.2	720p	WAPA2HD	WAPA Deportes
4.3	720p	WAPA3	WAPA 4.3

Subchannels of WTIN-TV
Subchannel	Res.	Short name	Programming
2.11	720p	WKAQ-DT	Telemundo West (WKAQ-TV)
2.21	480i	WKAQ.2	Punto 2 (WKAQ-DT2)
4.1	720p	WTIN-DT	Main WTIN-TV programming / WAPA-TV
4.2	720p	WTIN-D2	WAPA Deportes
4.3	480i	WTIN-D3	WAPA 4.3

Simulcast of subchannels of another station

=== Analog-to-digital conversion ===
WAPA-TV shut down its analog signal, over VHF channel 4, on June 12, 2009, the official date on which full-power television stations in the United States transitioned from analog to digital broadcasts under federal mandate. The station's digital signal remained on its pre-transition UHF channel 27, using virtual channel 4.

== External links and sources ==
- Official website
- The Museum of Broadcasting – Puerto Rico TV Profile
