= Ada Monzón =

Puerto Rican meteorologist and museum founder (born 1965)

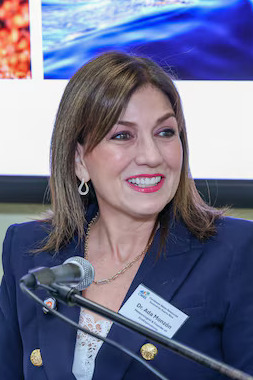
- Monzón on February 20, 2026
- Born: May 12, 1965 (age 61); San Juan, Puerto Rico, U.S.
- Education: University of Puerto Rico; Florida State University
- Occupations: Meteorologist; Museum founder
- Awards: Forbes 50 over 50 2025

Ada Monzón (born May 12, 1965) is a Puerto Rican meteorologist and museum founder. She is the first woman meteorologist in Puerto Rico. She is also the founder of the EcoExploratorio: Museo de Ciencias de Puerto Rico, a science museum in Puerto Rico.

== Early life and education ==
Monzon was born on May 12, 1965, in San Juan, Puerto Rico. She has recounted that her mother, aunt, and grandmother were all STEM teachers, and from the age of six, she knew she wanted to become a meteorologist. However, there were no universities in Puerto Rico which taught meteorology, and economic factors prohibited her from attending universities in the mainland U.S.

She therefore earned a bachelors' degree in mathematics, concentrating in physics, at the University of Puerto Rico. She then received a NASA fellowship to study meteorology at Florida State University, in Tallahassee, Florida, where she was the only civilian.

== Career ==
Monzón subsequently worked at the Federal Aviation Administration and the Kennedy Space Center, before moving back to Puerto Rico, where she became the island's first female meteorologist. She worked as a professor at the University of Puerto Rico.

She subsequently worked in private companies and local government before working at major news stations on Puerto Rico. Monzón became known for her broadcasts on WAPA-TV, Univision Radio, and Noticias Telemundo in 2017 during Hurricane Irma and Hurricane Maria, during which her broadcasts were viewed by more than 31,000,000 people. She also visited some of the most-affected locations, where she provided support. In 2019, she began working for NotiCentro.

=== Museum ===
Monzón is also the founder and president of the EcoExploratorio: Museo de Ciencias de Puerto Rico (transl. Museum of Science of Puerto Rico), which she established in 2010 as a nonprofit. She was inspired by the California Academy of Sciences.

The organization began by leasing a building in 2014. Land was leased for a new building in 2019 and construction began in 2021 through a grant from the United States Department of Commerce Economic Development Administration. Monzón re-opened the museum in 2025, featuring funds from Goya and FirstBank and rooms themed around bioluminescent bays and natural disasters.

=== Accolades and memberships ===
Monzón was named to the "Forbes 50 over 50" ljst in 2025 in the Innovation section. She has been named by Forbes, ArabiaWeather, The Washington Post, the Royal Meteorological Society, and The Weather Channel as one of the most-influential female meteorologists of all time.

She is a fellow of the American Meteorological Society.
