= Elwood Cruz =

Puerto Rican reporter and news anchor

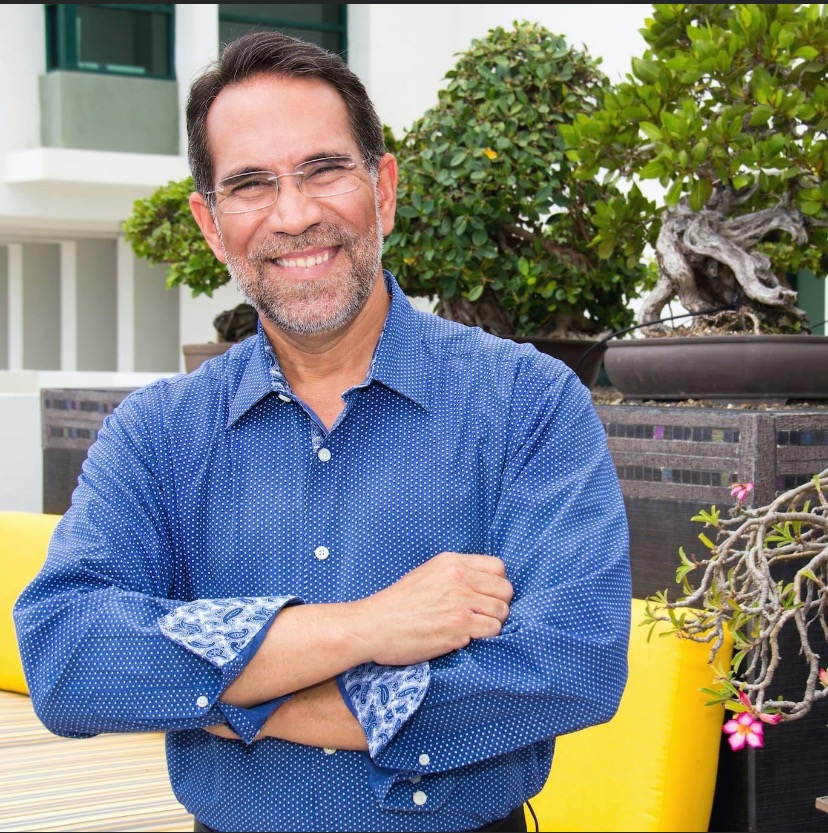
- Elwood Cruz in 2020
- Born: May 31, 1960 (age 65); Las Piedras, Puerto Rico
- Education: University of Puerto Rico
- Occupation(s): News anchor, sports reporter
- Years active: 1986–present
- Notable credit(s): Las Noticias; Tu Mañana and Tu Medíodia
- Children: 2

Elwood Cruz is a Puerto Rican reporter and news anchor. He served as the host for his talk show En Record from Abc 5 Puerto Rico.

Elwood was born in Las Piedras, Puerto Rico on May 31, 1960. He completed elementary, intermediate, and high school studies in the public education system. In 1978, he began accounting studies at the then Regional College of Humacao. Nevertheless, Elwood discovered a passion and devotedness for communications, therefore transferring to the Río Piedras Campus of the University of Puerto Rico in 1981. In 1984, he graduated magna cum laude in Communication Arts with a concentration in Radio, Television, and Cinema at the Communications School of the University of Puerto Rico in Río Piedras. That same year he began working at Wapa Television as a production assistant on the morning program "Hoy. In July 1986, he moved to Tele-Once to work as a video editor. Three months later, the news department director asked him to fill in for the sports anchor in "Las Noticias" for two weeks. He remained as a sports anchor for 16 years, covering both the noon and evening sections.

In June 2002, Elwood began to work as the anchor reporter for Univisión PR's morning show “Tu Mañana”. Through his career as a sports reporter, he covered the 1993 Central American and Caribbean Games in Ponce, and the 1996 Summer Olympics in Atlanta, Georgia. In addition, he has interviewed figures such as Michael Jordan, J Balvin, Magic Johnson, and Tito Trinidad, among others. In November 2014, he began working as the host and presenter of the program "En Record" on ABC-5 Puerto Rico. He was also a news presenter for the “Lente Viral” cyber platform. Cruz has received various awards for his work, the Intre, Quijote, Agüeybana, and Paoli Awards, as well as the Overseas Press Club. He mentions sports reporter Luis Rigual as his biggest influence. Elwood is in love with music, nature, sports, his country and its people, and his family. He currently works as a columnist for the daily newspaper “El Nuevo Día”.

== Personal life ==
Cruz is married and has two children: a daughter (born September 9, 1989) and a son (born April 23, 2001).
