= Rubén Sánchez (journalist) =

Puerto Rican journalist

- Born: March 3, 1963 (age 63); San Juan, Puerto Rico

Rubén Sánchez is the main talk news personality at WAPA Media Radio (WKAQ-AM) in San Juan, Puerto Rico as well as has served as anchorman for several TV daily news interview programs.

Born in San Juan, Puerto Rico on March 3, 1963, Sánchez is a graduate of the Universidad del Sagrado Corazón. For years, he was deputy director of the news department at the Notiuno radio network in Puerto Rico, rising to the post of news director. Subsequently hired by Univisión, he currently anchors the radio network's morning drive time newscast from 6 to 8 am, has conducted a two-hour highly rated daily news interview program and co-anchored a political analysis program with the late political analyst Juan Manuel García Passalacqua. At WAPA-TV, he anchored A Calzón Quitao, a daily mid-afternoon news interview program and a political news edition on prime time Friday evenings. Both programs were carried by WAPA's nationwide superstation, WAPA-América, seen by Puerto Ricans and other Hispanics in many U.S. media markets.

On September,6,2023, Hemisphere Media Group, the leading media company specializing in Spanish-language television programming and content distribution, announced today that it completed its acquisition of WKAQ AM and KQ105 FM from TelevisaUnivision (formerly known as Univision/ Univision Radio.

He anchored a similar program called Rubén & Co., alongside Daniela Droz and Gredmarie Colón in Univision Puerto Rico.

Sánchez has also served as a part-time journalism professor at Turabo University in Caguas, Puerto Rico.

He is married and has two daughters and two sons.

== Sources ==
- Univision biography (in Spanish)
- https://www.prnewswire.com/news-releases/hemisphere-media-group-acquires-two-radio-stations-and-announces-the-launch-of-wapa-media-revolutionizing-puerto-ricos-media-landscape-301918925.html
