= Juan Manuel García Passalacqua =

Puerto Rican lawyer and political analyst (1937–2010)

- Born: February 22, 1937; Hato Rey, Puerto Rico
- Died: July 2, 2010 (aged 73); Mount Vernon, Ohio, US
- Education: Tufts University; Tulane University; Harvard Law School
- Occupations: Lawyer, author, political analyst
- Years active: 1950s–2009
- Known for: Analyst on politics of Puerto Rico
- Television: Cara a Cara Ante el País; La Escuelita segment (Mediodía Puerto Rico: WAPA-TV)
- Political party: Popular Democratic Party (formerly)
- Movement: Reformism
- Spouse: Ivonne Acosta
- Children: 1

Juan Manuel García Passalacqua (February 22, 1937 – July 2, 2010) was a Puerto Rican lawyer, author and political analyst on Puerto Rican politics.

== Early years ==
Juan Manuel García Passalacqua was born on February 22, 1937 in the Hato Rey district of San Juan, Puerto Rico. He showed interest in studying law from a very young age, and he held degrees from Tufts University, Tulane University and Harvard Law School. His father was a professor of literature at the University of Puerto Rico and his uncle was a candidate for governor for the Puerto Rican Independence Party. After obtaining his law degree, he went on to work as aide to governors Luis Muñoz Marín and Roberto Sánchez Vilella, both of the Popular Democratic Party. He was a member of a reformist group, known in Puerto Rico as The 22. He was married to Ivonne Acosta, a college professor and author, until his death, and both had Ivonne Marie García Acosta, also a college professor.

== Writer and political analyst ==
García Passalacqua later showed discontent with the Popular Democratic Party, eventually disaffiliating himself with them. He became a television producer in Puerto Rico; one of his most important shows was Cara a Cara Ante el País. During the 1980s, García Passalacqua became one of the most sought after political analysts by other television producers, becoming a common figure in Puerto Rican television during election years.

He wrote more than twenty books, in both Spanish and English, mostly on Caribbean affairs and politics. In 1982, he was invited to become a member of the Council on Foreign Relations. He was also a member of the Ambassadors Circle of the Carter Center in Atlanta. As part of his duties with the Carter Center, he served as an impartial election observer in more than a dozen countries around the world.

García Passalacqua taught classes as a visiting professor at colleges ranging from Yale University to the Center for Advanced Studies on Puerto Rico and the Caribbean in San Juan. For many years he served as legal counsel for the Ana G. Méndez Foundation. In his role as a political analyst in Puerto Rico, he was known to give his opinion or criticism of Puerto Rican parties without particularly lining up with or against any of the three major parties. Over the years, he consistently proposed an associated republic political relationship between Puerto Rico and the United States, since he wrote his masters thesis on the topic in 1957 for Professor Carl Joachim Friedrich at Harvard. He wrote columns for newspapers such as El Nuevo Día, El Vocero and The San Juan Star. In 2006, he returned to WKAQ-AM, Puerto Rico's most important news radio station, as an on-air political commentator.

García Passalacqua had a political analysis segment, La Escuelita, on the midday television variety show Mediodía Puerto Rico, which aired on WAPA-TV. After an incident in which he apparently made a comment about Governor Aníbal Acevedo Vilá's daughter, who was underage at the time, he was fired from the show and did not set foot in the station again. He instead took phone interviews when other news programs, journalists, and the gossip news show, SuperXclusivo, recurred to him for political analysis for the station.

== Later years ==
In early 2009, García Passalacqua reduced his level of public activities for health reasons and began to be the object of published testimonials. Governor Luis Fortuño issued a proclamation declaring February 22, 2009 Juan Manuel García Passalacqua Day in recognition of his accomplishments in public service, academia, journalism and political analysis. Fortuño, a former neighbor of García Passalacqua, considered the latter one of his mentors in his formative years. García Passalacqua later re-joined WKAQ-AM as a political analyst, suggesting that his health had improved. However, on May 7, 2010, a letter penned by him was read on-air on WKAQ-AM's noon program, addressed to the station's news director, Javier Cosme, and the program's audience, stating that he was leaving both the radio program and Puerto Rico to be at peace in his remaining time, since he had been diagnosed with terminal liver cancer.

During his last months of life, he resided at the Ohio home of his daughter Ivonne Marie García Acosta, a college professor. García Passalacqua died in Mount Vernon, Ohio, on July 2, 2010, surrounded by his family and wife.

Governor Fortuño declared three days of mourning, July 3, 5 and 6, during which the flags of Puerto Rico and United States were flown at half-staff, with the exception of July 4, since flags are never flown at half-staff on Independence Day, even though Puerto Rico is an unincorporated territory.

== See also ==
- List of Puerto Ricans
- List of television presenters/Puerto Rico
- Luis Francisco Ojeda
