= María Falcón =

Puerto Rican television reporter

María Falcón is a Puerto Rican television reporter, show host and television producer. She worked for many years at channel 6 and at Channel 7 on Puerto Rico's television and as of 2016, on a television show named GeoAmbiente, which is transmitted on a television channel named Sistema TV.

During a very long time, Falcón, along with Miss Universe 1985 Deborah Carthy-Deu and legendary actor and comedian Yoyo Boing, hosted a television show named Desde Mi Pueblo on WIPR-TV.

During 2013, she was personally nominated by Puerto Rican governor Alejandro García Padilla to become channel 6's president.

During 2021, Falcón was given a special award by WIPR-TV for her continuing work on Puerto Rican television.

== Personal ==
Falcón is a native of Bayamón, Puerto Rico. She and her husband Steve Dalmau, a construction industry executive, live at Barrio Cubuy in Canóvanas, Puerto Rico.

== See also ==
- List of Puerto Ricans
