= Carmen Jovet =

Puerto Rican journalist

- Born: Carmen Jovet Esteves; June 9, 1944 (age 82); Mayagüez, Puerto Rico
- Education: University of Puerto Rico
- Occupations: Journalist, news anchor

Carmen Jovet Esteves (born June 9, 1944) is a journalist and the first female news anchor in Puerto Rico.

== Early years ==
Carmen Jovet Esteves, daughter of Manolín Jovet-Viruet and Doña Carmen "Cuca" Esteves, was born and raised in Mayagüez, Puerto Rico into a family where having a good education was important. She was considered a gifted child and quickly advanced in school. She started making speeches when she was 6 years old, first appeared on radio at the age of 7 with radio personality Pedro Ojeda on WPRA-AM in Mayagüez, and by time she was 12, she was a competent orator. She enjoyed participating in her school's extracurricular activities. She was a member of various academic groups including the school's drama club.

Jovet graduated from high school when she was 14 years old and enrolled in the University of Puerto Rico on a scholarship. When she was 17, she graduated with honors with a bachelor's degree in Political Sciences.

== Career ==
Jovet's first job was at "WIPR" Channel 6, where she hosted a program called "Club Seis" and later a program called "Fabrica del Arte". In 1968, Jovet caught the attention of Leopoldo Santiago Lavandero, who invited her to join his production "Panorama Mundial" as a reporter, at the same Channel. A few years later she was offered the position of anchor for "El Once en la Noticias" at Telecadena Pérez Perry (Channel 11) and thus became the first Puerto Rican woman news anchor on the island.

In 1975, Jovet founded her own independent production company and became the host of a show which investigated and interviewed public figures. Among those interviewed was the President of Venezuela Carlos Andrés Pérez. She also covered the arrest of Puerto Rican actress Lydia Echevarría.

Jovet hosted the TV show Sabado en Grande (Big Saturday) for a short time before joining Channel 2, where she hosted her own show, "Carmen Jovet, Controversial", a talk show in which the public was encouraged to participate.

Following the Cerro Maravilla murders, Jovet joined journalists Tomás Stella and Manny Suárez to investigate the matter and inquiry on the account if Julio Molina Ortiz, which eventually lead to the arrest of two police officers for the murders. A commentary show hosted by José Antonio "El Profe" Ortiz, was originally co-hosted by Mariano Artau and Carmen Jovet. Later, Jovet was moved to the news segment Cámara Siete. By 1981 she was the news director of WKBM, Channel 11. During the Falklands War, Jovet was the only female correspondent covering the event, doing so for Cámara Siete and WRIK-TV. She secured one of the few interviews given by Argentine Defense Minister Amadeo Frugoli during the conflict. She also hosted Los siete del Siete in the prime time slot.

During the investigations on the murders that the Senate of Puerto Rico held in June 1983, she served as the representative of Cámara Siete when the channel secured exclusivity rights. In 1989 she was noted by the New York Times as being one of Puerto Rico's most popular television personalities, a sentiment echoed by the New York Daily News in 1991.

In 1987, The Governor of Puerto Rico Rafael Hernández Colón, named Jovet as the official coordinator in charge of the official state visit of the King and Queen of Spain. In 1992, she was named the Director of Communications of the Commission in charge of the 5th Centennial Celebration of the encounter of the Two Worlds. She was the host of a program called Ahora Podemos Hablar, transmitted through Telemundo TV. For the 40th anniversary of Puerto Rican television, TeleOnce aired a special titled 40 Kilates de Televisión produced by Rafo Muñiz in which she made an appearance. On February 3, 1997, she participated in Los 75 años de don Tommy, a special dedicated to Muñiz's career.

== Recognitions ==
Among the many recognitions bestowed upon her are:

- The title of "Lady Television" by the Superior Council of Art;
- The Order of Duarte Horsemen, Sanchez and Mella by the President of the Dominican Republic Joaquín Balaguer;
- The José de Diego Award from the Institute of Puerto Rican Culture
- "Doctorate Honoris Causa" in Criminal Justice from the John Jay College of Criminal Justice in New York City.

She is popularly known in Puerto Rico as "La Mujer Noticia".

== Currently ==
Carmen Jovet is currently active as a radio commentator, hosting her own radio talk/news show on NotiUno radio network - 630AM from 10:00 AM until noon. Besides her career as a journalist, Jovet was an occasional actress and had a small role in the 1989 film Brenda Starr starring Brooke Shields.

In the aftermath of the January 12, 2010 earthquake that devastated Port-au-Prince, Haiti, Puerto Rico, then-Governor Luis Fortuño asked her to coordinate a telethon to benefit the Red Cross's Haitian relief efforts. The telethon raised over $3.3 million. In preparation for the telethon, Jovet, along with Puerto Rico Secretary of State and Lieutenant Governor Kenneth McClintock, travelled to Haiti and met and interviewed then-President René Préval, Prime Minister Jean-Max Bellerive and First Lady Elisabeth Delatour Préval.

She held a one-hour weekly interview program, Ahora Podemos Hablar, on WIPR-TV, Puerto Rico's public television station, on Sunday prime time. After the death of Carlos Mamery late in 2014, Jovet signed with WAPA-America to substitute him on their show, Lo Sé Todo, where she is now a political analyst.

In May 2025, the Senate of Puerto Rico designated its Press and Communications Room with the number "Sala Carmen Jovet Esteves", as the first major Puerto Rican female journalist.

== See also ==
- List of Puerto Ricans
- French immigration to Puerto Rico
- List of television presenters/Puerto Rico
- History of women in Puerto Rico
- Jennifer Wolff
