= Avelino Muñoz Stevenson =

Puerto Rican television sportscaster (1956–2019)

Avelino Muñoz Stevenson (November 23, 1956 at San Juan, Puerto Rico – June 21, 2019 at Hato Rey, Puerto Rico) was a Puerto Rican television sportscaster, newspaper reporter, actor, comedian, show host, emcee, television producer and musical promoter of Panamanian descent. He was, for many years, the main sportscaster and sports news director of Puerto Rico's channel 6's television news shows. Muňoz Stevenson was also the leader of the "Cabecitas Rapadas" foundation, which aims at helping cancer patients and their families with among other things, pharmacy, transportation and treatment costs.

== Biography ==
Muňoz Stevenson was the son of the famed Panamanian musician Avelino Muñoz. He began his professional life at the age of 16, when he started out as a news reporter for one of the then three newspapers with a national reach in Puerto Rico, El Dia' Soon after, he moved on to working on Puerto Rican television and became friends with, among others, the former Baloncesto Superior Nacional and Puerto Rico men's national basketball team member Fufi Santori, himself a buddying sportscaster and newspaper writer at the same time.

Muňoz Stevenson graduated from Juan Jose Osuna high school in Hato Rey and moved to Spain where he studied at the Universidad Complutense de Madrid, obtaining a degree in physical education.

Muňoz Stevenson later worked for El Reportero and El Mundo; he became sports news director at the latter two newspapers.

During the 1980s, Muňoz Stevenson was the main sportscaster for WIPR-TV, channel 6 on Puerto Rican television. He was in charge of the station's daily newscasts' sports news and of occasional live sports events shown on Puerto Rico's governments' television station. In 1988, upon the creation of Channel 24, a Puerto Rican 24-hour news television station, Muňoz Stevenson moved there. Later on, Muňoz Stevenson worked at TeleOnce, Telemundo Puerto Rico and at TeleOnce's successor, Univision, as a sportscaster and sometime actor, comedian and television producer.

=== Sports stars interviewed ===
Muńoz Stevenson met and interviewed many Puerto Rican and international sports celebrities during his career. Among them, Muhammad Ali, Pelé, Diego Maradona, Martina Navratilova, Larry Bird and Michael Jordan.

=== Musical promoter ===
Muňoz Stevenson became a musical promoter later on, promoting concerts by, among others, Dizzy Gillespie, Tito Puente, Ruben Blades and Willie Colon.

=== Other television jobs ===
Muňoz Stevenson expanded his television career and was involved in television shows with noted Puerto Ricans, fellow celebrities Luisito Vigoreaux and Hector Marcano. He was also the show host of the Puerto Rican telecasts of American bloopers show, America's Funniest Videos.

== Personal life ==
Muňoz Stevenson had two sons: singer Jowell and Eduardo Muńoz. Jowell is a member of Jowell & Randy, a Puerto Rican musical duo.

== Illness and death ==
He was diagnosed with pulmonary emphysema in 2016. He battled the disease by using various methods, including natural medicine, until early in June 2019, he was admitted to Hospital del Maestro in Hato Rey, Puerto Rico, needing a blood transfusion. He remained in a coma about three weeks, until he died on June 21, 2019, the victim of bacteria. He was 62 years old.

== See also ==
- List of Puerto Ricans
- Junior Abrams
- Rafael Bracero
- Manolo Rivera Morales
