= Evelio Otero =

Puerto Rican journalist

- Born: March 13, 1920; Santiago de Cuba
- Died: February 12, 1988 (aged 67); Colesville, Maryland
- Occupations: journalist, television anchorman

Evelio Otero (March 13, 1920 – February 12, 1988) was the first television anchorman in Puerto Rico and one of the first in Latin America.

== Early life ==
Otero was born on March 13, 1920, in Santiago de Cuba, Cuba, to a Galician father and Canarian mother. The next to youngest of six brothers and sisters, he was raised by a family of teachers and writers, when his birth father couldn't handle raising the children after the death of their mother during childbirth of the youngest.

== Career ==
Otero began working in radio at the age of 18, as a color commentator for basketball games in Santiago de Cuba. In 1945, he arrived in Havana, where his voice was heard on the Cadena Azul network. In 1948, Don Angel Ramos in San Juan, Puerto Rico had decided that his brand new television station, Channel 2, needed an experienced and unique voice talent. Don Ramos had heard of Otero and brought him to Puerto Rico. Evelio became the first voice to be heard on the television sets newly arrived in Puerto Rico.

When the word was given to go ahead and launch Channel 2, Evelio suggested to introduce the station as Telenoticias del mundo and Ramos agreed. Evelio went on to be the anchor for the first television news show in Puerto Rico becoming the first broadcast journalist in the island. Today the station is called Telemundo (meaning, roughly, "world television"). Telemundo was the first thing to show on televisions in Puerto Rico, with transmissions starting in January 1954.

During the advent of television news, newscasters read the news without looking up at the audience. This bothered Otero so much that he fought to have this changed and so teleprompters were designed so that the newscaster could look at the audience while reading the news.

Soon after the coup d'état by Fulgencio Batista in Cuba, Otero returned to Puerto Rico where he continued the television program, and because of his reputation he became the dean of news anchors in Puerto Rico.

In 1961, after the birth of his son Evelio Jr., Otero moved to the brand new Channel 4 television station and became the first anchor at WAPA-TV. He had a sense of history, which drove him more than awards or economic success. On 31 December 1972, hall of fame baseball player, Roberto Clemente, visited Otero after appearing at a local game show on New Year's Eve requesting help for the suffering caused by the devastating earthquake in Managua, Nicaragua.

In 1980, Otero moved to Maryland, where he was hired as a senior editor for the (Voz de las Américas), Voice of America in Spanish. Shortly thereafter, he assumed the same duties for the new "Radio Marti" program of the Voice of America, which was geared towards Cuba and was broadcast from Washington, D.C.

== Personal life ==
Otero married a high school teacher, Consuelo Rivera and moved to Cuba in 1951 with his pregnant new bride. They had a daughter they named Altagracia and a son Evelio Jr., who years later, obtained a degree in Public Science and Journalism. Otero and his wife lived near the U.S. capital in a suburb of Maryland until his death in 1988.

== Death ==
Otero died in a fire in his home, an apartment in Colesville, Maryland, on 12 February 1988. A winter storm had left residents without electrical power and after lighting candles, a fire began in the apartment building. He was found near the door trying to exit his apartment. His son Evelio Jr. (a captain in the U.S. Air Force at the time of his father's death), Evelio Sr. was buried at the Cementerio Buxeda in Isla Verde, Puerto Rico.
