= Luis Francisco Ojeda =

Puerto Rican journalist

- Born: June 16, 1941 (age 84); Jayuya, Puerto Rico
- Other name: Ojeda
- Occupation: reporter
- Political party: Independent

Luis Francisco Ojeda (born June 16, 1941) is a well-known Puerto Rican television, radio reporter and host, noted for his aggressive, uncompromising questioning. He spent 50 years on radio until his retirement in 2020.

== Early years ==
Ojeda was born in Jayuya. He moved to Ponce when he was still a youngster. While studying in high school, he got his first opportunity to talk live in a daily show, becoming a newscaster for Ponce's WPAB radio station.

== Career as a newscaster ==
Ojeda signed a contract with WAPA in 1960, and moved to San Juan. He worked at WAPA as newscaster (and occasional disc jockey) until 1968, moving on that year to work for rival WKAQ-Radio Reloj. While there, he had to cover the historic riots at the University of Puerto Rico at Rio Piedras in 1971. In one of the incidents covered by Ojeda a shooting ensued, and Ojeda, in the middle of the shootout, rescued a police lieutenant who had been shot. Despite his efforts, the police officer died from his gunshot wounds in the back of the remote unit truck while Ojeda was broadcasting his and his driver's frantic rush to the nearest emergency room live.

Ojeda was later offered a job as the news director and anchorman of Telemundo Puerto Rico's television news show. He decided, however, not to take the job, opting instead to join then governor Rafael Hernández Colón's staff, as a member of Puerto Rico's Communications Office. Ojeda needed to work as a journalist, however, and, by 1973, he decided to step in front of the television cameras for the first time, working at channel 11's news show. Not long after Ojeda joined channel 11, the channel's owner had died and the station went bankrupt, so Ojeda signed on with WAPA-TV to work as a field reporter at Noticentro 4.

Ojeda spent most of his time at Noticentro 4 traveling across Puerto Rico, working as an on-the-field reporter, but he also sporadically got chances to host the show, usually filling in for a sick anchorman or woman. He worked on various tragedies, government scandals and other types of news while at Noticentro 4, essentially pioneering investigative reporting in Puerto Rican television.

== Ojeda, Sin Limite ==
In 1987, he was given his own television talk show, Ojeda, Sin Limite (Ojeda, Without Limit). He became known for his strong questioning of participants of the show, and the show produced a number of classic moments of Puerto Rican television; such as the time that two of the three candidates for Puerto Rican commissioner in Washington, D.C., the PNP's Carlos Romero Barceló (former governor of Puerto Rico) and the PPD's Miguel Hernandez Agosto got into a shouting match, calling each other "liar" multiple times and almost physically assaulting each other.

After his show was cancelled, Ojeda continued Ojeda, Sin Limite as a radio show, on WKAQ-Radio.

== Currently ==
In 2000, he returned to television, with a show named Ojeda, once again at WAPA-TV, which, by then, had the new name of Televicentro. Later on, he was offered a fifteen-minute space on Televicentro's midday variety show, Mediodía Puerto Rico (Midday Puerto Rico), where he would accept calls from the public in a segment called "La Descarga" (Discharge). In this segment, Don Eleuterio, comedian Sunshine Logroño's alter ego who was a backer of Puerto Rican statehood movements (Logrono himself is a backer of Puerto Rican independence), calls and changes his name trying to pass as another person from the public. Ojeda of course recognizes his voice. Don Eleuterio then usually praises the American people and picks on Ojeda for being an "independista" (an advocate of P.R.'s independence). Ojeda now collaborates on a new radio station show as well.

As of May 15, 2009, Ojeda broadcast his last "descarga" and on the air tendered his resignation in response to the cancellation of the remaining local programs (Club Sunshine and TV Ilegal) and the dismissal of Junior Alvarez over comments made of mistreatment in part of the vice-president of programming, Jimmy Arteaga, of Peruvian descent. In 2013, Ojeda returned to television again, in Dando Candela by Telemundo.

Ojeda retired in March 2020.

== See also ==
- List of television presenters/Puerto Rico
- List of Puerto Ricans
- Juan Manuel García Passalacqua
