= Luis Antonio Cosme =

Puerto Rican television cook, singer, actor, writer and television reporter

- Occupations: television cook, actor, singer, musician, writer, producer, reporter and show host
- Known for: Show host of two television cooking shows named "Friendo y Comiendo" (on WAPA-TV, channel 4) and "A Freir y a Comer" (Telemundo Puerto Rico, channel 2).

Luis Antonio Cosme is a Puerto Rican television cook, actor, singer, musician, writer, producer, reporter and show host. He is mostly known as one of two show hosts and cooks, usually alongside Otilio Warrington, "Bizcocho", of two television cooking shows named "Friendo y Comiendo" (on WAPA-TV, channel 4) and "A Freir y a Comer" (Telemundo Puerto Rico, channel 2).

== Musical career ==
Cosme began his career in entertainment during 1952, as a third guitarist and leading voice on a group named "Los Marqueses". He later joined the Universidad de Puerto Rico's choir and in 1959, he sang as a soloist at the Festival Casals, having met maestro Pablo Casals previously.

A few years later, Cosme joined a touring group of the Metropolitan Opera House also composed by Justino Diaz and Pablo Elvira; this group toured Puerto Rico and Cosme was able to sing operas.

In 1972, Cosme, along with singers Tito Lara, Vilma Colon, Carmen Caldas, Gloria Caldas, and Luis Beltran Rojas, formed a band named "Allegro 72". In this musical group, he was later joined by Lunna, Cosme's future show co-host Dagmar, Alice Gracia and Lunna's future husband, Cuco Pena. With this group, Cosme sang at New York City's Carnegie Hall.

During the late 1980s, Cosme re-took his music career, playing guitar on some of his stepdaughter, opera and Christian music singer Yolanda Vadiz's presentations.

== News reporter ==
Cosme periodically left his music career when he was offered a job as a news reporter on WIPR-TV, channel 6, Puerto Rico's government's television station. He covered the Dominican Civil War, the Bay of Pigs Invasion in Cuba and happenings at the Panama Canal, among others.

== Acting ==
Beginning in 1961, Cosme sang and acted in Broadway productions such as Oklahoma!, Carousel, and Guys and Dolls.

=== Filmography ===
Cosme has acted in films, including:

- Las Pasiones Infernales (1969)
- Tu, Mi Amor (1972)
- Nicolas y los Demas (1986, as a TV Announcer)
- El Derecho de Comer (1986)
- Bananas (with Woody Allen)

== Show host ==
Cosme's career as a show host began in 1982 when he hosted "Friendo y Comiendo" at WAPA-TV. In 1984, he moved to WAPA-TV's rival channel, Telemundo Puerto Rico, lured by an offer to host a game show named Super Sabados, which was broadcast across Puerto Rico and to the Dominican Republic and the United States.

In 1985, Telemundo Puerto Rico revived Cosme's old cooking show from WAPA-TV, renaming it "A Freir y a Comer". This version of the show lasted many years on the air.

== Writings ==
Cosme also wrote several books about cooking, including 1983's "Friendo y Comiendo" (loosely translated to "Frying and Eating" but in Puerto Rican Spanish the title translates better to "Cooking and Eating"), a 2000 re-edition of "Friendo y Comiendo", 2011's "Cocina Facil Para Ninos" ("Easy Cooking for Children") and 2015's "Riendo y Comiendo" ("Laughing and Eating") which is a book with recipes for diabetic diets.

== Health issues ==
Cosme suffers heart related problems and wears a pacemaker. Cosme is also a diabetic.

== See also ==
- List of Puerto Ricans
