= Aníbal González Irizarry =

Puerto Rican journalist

Anibal González Irizarry
- Born: February 25, 1927; Sabana Grande, Puerto Rico
- Died: November 14, 2018 (aged 91); Santurce, Puerto Rico
- Occupations: television journalist Pastor
- Years active: 1950—1994
- Spouse: Ruth Pérez Pérez

Aníbal González Irizarry (February 25, 1927 – November 14, 2018) was a Puerto Rican educator, journalist and news broadcaster.

== Early years ==
González Irizarry was born and raised in Sabana Grande, Puerto Rico, where he received his primary and secondary education. He completed 3 years of high school at Sabana Grande High School before his family moved to San Juan. There he attended the "Escuela Superior Central" (Central High School) of Santurce. In 1942, when he was 15 years old, he began to work at "WPRA" a radio station in Mayaguez and soon became the station's main broadcaster.

== Radio broadcaster ==
In 1950, González Irizarry moved to New York City to work in a factory. Whilst there he found a position at the radio station "WWRL" in a program called "La Voz Hispana del Aire" (The Hispanic Voice on the Air). In that program, he created a character which he called "Monje Loco" (Crazy Monk). In 1951, he joined the radio station "WENX" and was named Director of Spanish Programs.

In 1953, González Irizarry joined the United States Army and after returning from the Korean War was honorably discharged. He then returned to New York and continued to work in the radio as a broadcaster. He enrolled and graduated from "The School of Radio and Television Techniques".

== News anchor ==
In 1956, González Irizarry returned to Puerto Rico and joined WKAQ, a Telemundo affiliate as its radio program announcer. He continued his academic career and graduated with a Law Degree from the University of Puerto Rico School of Law. Telemundo first introduced Telenoticias (TV News) in 1954 and in 1977, Telenoticias en Accion in a new format with him as main anchor along with Ramon Enrique Torres, Bruni Vélez and Junior Abrams.

== Later years and death ==
González Irizarry married Ruth Perez Perez and they had two children: Anibal Jr. and Lissette. In 1994 he retired as anchor of Telenoticias en Accion in Telemundo. Besides news broadcasting, González Irizarry taught Communications at the Universidad del Sagrado Corazón in Santurce. He was the co-pastor of the Disciples of Christ Church in Ponce. and also served as spokesperson for Medicare advanced health plans in Puerto Rico. González Irizarry died on November 14, 2018, of natural causes at Pavia hospital in Santurce, Puerto Rico. He was cremated and his ashes were taken to his hometown of Sabana Grande, Puerto Rico. In 2025, Aníbal González Irizarry was posthumously inducted to the Puerto Rico Veterans Hall of Fame.

== See also ==
- List of Puerto Ricans
