= Keylla Hernández =

Puerto Rican television reporter

Keylla Ivonne Hernández Ramos (May 10, 1973 – December 31, 2018) better known as Keylla Hernández, was a Puerto Rican television reporter. She worked for WAPA-TV and was the co-anchor of the station's morning news show, Noticentro al Amanecer.

== Personal ==
Hernández was born on May 10, 1973 in Mayagüez, Puerto Rico. Hernández had a husband, Robin, and two sons.

She graduated in journalism from the Universidad del Sagrado Corazón in 1995.

During her cancer battle, Hernández befriended Puerto Rican Independence Party's politician and governor candidate Juan Dalmau and his family; one of Dalmau's sons also had cancer.

She was married to husband Robin and had two sons.

== Acting ==
Hernandez participated, during 2017, in a theatrical play named "Titantos", alongside Marilyn Pupo, among others.

== Disease ==
During 2015, Hernández went to a doctor's checkup following a chest injury; x-rays and further testing revealed she had lung cancer. Hernández made a public announcement concerning her diagnosis during a live broadcast.

At first she showed some improvements and she briefly returned to co-anchor Noticentro al Amanecer, but was re-diagnosed during the summer of 2018, this time with liver cancer. She flew to Tampa, Florida, for monthly treatments and further testing at the H. Lee Moffitt Cancer Center & Research Institute.

== Death ==
Hernández died of cancer at a Puerto Rican hospital on December 31, 2018, surrounded by her family. Hernández's funeral was partly held at the Palacio de Recreación y Deportes coliseum in her native Mayagüez, Puerto Rico. Her funeral was broadcast live to Puerto Rico and the United States. Her ashes were scattered in Puerto Rico.

In addition, many people came from across Puerto Rico to see her for the last time at her Mayagüez wake.

== Legacy ==
Governor Ricardo Rosselló expressed that "(he was) lamenting the sad news of the passing of Keylla Hernández. Her battle against cancer was an example of tenacity that inspired many in a similar situation. (Rosselló's wife) Beatriz and I send a solidarity hug to her family, her co-workers at @WapaTV, and her friends".

San Juan mayor, Carmen Yulín Cruz. meanwhile, declared that the city's flags would fly at half-mast.

== See also ==
- List of Puerto Ricans
