= Pedro Rosa Nales =

Puerto Rican journalist

- Born: December 3, 1956 (age 69); Fajardo, Puerto Rico
- Occupations: journalist; news anchor
- Military career
- Allegiance: United States
- Branch: United States Army
- Service years: 1973–1980
- Rank: Captain

Pedro Rosa Nales (born December 3, 1956, in Fajardo, Puerto Rico) is a Puerto Rican journalist, news anchor and a recognized martial artist. As a journalist he has received over 20 awards.

== Journalism ==
He started working at radio station WMDD in Fajardo. As a television journalist, he was recruited by the WAPA-TV channel 4 of San Juan, Puerto Rico, in 1981, becoming the first black Puerto Rican to work as a TV reporter. During his 32 years as a TV journalist, he had won more than 100 awards from several organizations in Puerto Rico and the United States, including awards for the coverage of hurricanes and investigative reports like Red Alert 1 and 2, in which he uncovered the military use of the Vieques island and the effects of army maneuvers on the population.

In the past years, he has worked as a host (Anchor) on various editions of Noticentro 4 on WAPA TV and in 2014 on "Noticentro America" for viewers in the United States. In 2017, he anchored the 5 p.m. news hour for Noticentro. In 2018, Noticentro Al Amanecer (Noticentro In the Morning) celebrated eighteen years on air.

Rosa Nales sued WAPA-TV during December 2020 for the amount of $2.5 million dollars, alleging he was ignored in favor of White colleagues when the network decided to install Rafael Lenin Lopez as main afternoon news reporter instead of him due to Rosa Nales' being Black and also an older person than Lenin Lopez.

== Martial arts ==
Following the circulation of internet memes showing him in martial arts poses, Rosa Nales stated that he has practiced martial arts for over 47 years.

== Personal life ==
He joined the United States Army in 1973 thru the Delayed Entry Program. Had his initial training at Fort Polk in Louisiana. Served as parachutist from the 82nd Airborne Division, in the 7th Special Forces Group (Airborne) and the 101st Airborne Division (Air Assault). He was later Press officer, Executive officer, Radio and Tv officer and Unit commander in the Puerto Rico National Guard with the rank of captain. Finished his military service in 1980.

In 2023 he was inducted to the Puerto Rico Veterans Hall of Fame.

Rosa Nales married young, and his wife had a daughter when he was just seventeen years old. They divorced while he was in the army. He has two children but in 2012, Rosa Nales 32-year-old daughter, who had fought addiction with the help of Hogares Crea, died of a possible overdose.

On June 29, 2021, Pedro Rosa Nales' sixteen year-old grandson was accused of murder, along with another teenager.
