= Junior Abrams =

Puerto Rican television and radio sportscaster

- Born: Juan Ramón Abrams Jr. April 25, 1955 (age 71); Vega Baja, Puerto Rico
- Occupations: Television presenter, radio broadcaster, sportscaster, actor
- Known for: Sports broadcasting in Puerto Rico

Juan Ramón Abrams Jr, better known as Junior Abrams (born April 25, 1955 in Vega Baja, Puerto Rico) is a Puerto Rican television and radio sportscaster, actor and show host.

== Biography ==
After years of radio broadcasting experience on WRAI AM with Harry Rexach's sports programs while still a student at Gabriela Mistral High School, Abrams first became well known to Puerto Rican television audiences during the late 1970s as the sports anchor of Canal 2's Telenoticias en Accion. He was the network's evening and nightly sports anchorman. As the network's only sportscaster, he competed in the same time-slot against WAPA TV's Luis Rigual, Rafael Bracero and Bobby Anglero. He covered several local and international sports events for decades at Telemundo Puerto Rico, including Olympic and Pan American Games, World Series, boxing fights and other events. He was also a radio baseball announcer.

During the 1990s, Junior Abrams sought to expand his career, becoming host of some Puerto Rican TV game shows, while continuing his sportscasting career. In 1992 he joined Silverio Pérez, Lourdes Collazo and Luis Raúl in WAPA-TV's "Qué Es Lo Que Pasa Aquí, ¿Ah?" a very successful mock news comedy show.

In 2007, Abrams' wife, Carmen D. Esteva González, was diagnosed with colon cancer. Five years later, in 2012, he was diagnosed with the same disease. Abrams joined Braulio Castillo, hijo and Raymond Dalmau, among others, as spokespersons for the American Cancer Society in Puerto Rico.

That same year (2012), Abrams joined Jailene Cintron as co-host of "Desde Mi Pueblo" ("From My Town"), a TV program dedicated to showcasing Puerto Rican cities on Puerto Rico's cable television.

Abrams is enshrined in the Sports Hall Of Fame of Vega Baja, along with Baseball Hall of Famer Iván Rodríguez and two-time American League MVP Juan González, among others.

== See also ==
- Ernestito Diaz Gonzalez
- Norman H. Davila
- List of Puerto Ricans
