= Guillermo José Torres =

Puerto Rican television reporter and news anchorman

Guillermo José Torres (born 1944 in Ponce, Puerto Rico) is a retired Puerto Rican television reporter and news anchorman. Served with the U.S. Army as a Captain in the Vietnam War and later in the Puerto Rico Air National Guard. He worked for WAPA-TV from 1969 until his retirement on August 5, 2013. Guinness World Records certified he broke the record as the anchorman with the longest career in the same station after 43 years. His son Guillermo Jose Torres, Jr. followed in his footsteps and started a career in WAPA TV as a news reporter. In November 2013, he returned to Wapa in "Ahí esta la verdad" for short voiceover work. In 2017 Guillermo José Torres was inducted to the Puerto Rico Veterans Hall of Fame.

== See also ==
- List of Puerto Ricans
