= Rafael Bracero =

Puerto Rican journalist and sportscaster

Rafael Bracero Torres (born 1950 in Santurce, Puerto Rico) is a Puerto Rican sportscaster. Bracero graduated from the University of Puerto Rico at Mayagüez then known as Colegio de Artes Mecánicas (College of Arts and Mechanical Arts - CAAM in Spanish) with a degree in civil engineering, and then he joined Puerto Rico's Perez Perry Channel 11 to cover sports as their main reporter.

The Perez Perry Network soon went bankrupt and then Bracero became the night sportscaster on WAPA-TV, a position in which he performed for two and a half years. At WAPA TV, their night news edition sportscasters were considered by WAPA executives as being second string to their afternoon news edition colleagues, so Bracero would, for those two and a half years, perform under the shadow of Luis Rigual, WAPAs afternoon sportscaster. Nevertheless, he joined Rigual to cover boxing fights and other live sporting events, and in sports documentaries. When Rigual died in 1983, Bracero became his substitute on the afternoon news cast.

Still as a WAPA sportscaster, Bracero worked with the transmissions of BSN basketball games (which he shared with Manolo Rivera Morales and Fufi Santori), boxing telecasts, MLB baseball games and football games. In 1988, he assisted with WAPA's transmission of the 1988 Seoul Olympic Games. One of Bracero's catchphrases during his basketball game telecasts was "Eeel Canasto!!!" (loosely translated to "Theee basket"!) which he pronounced in a way similar to Marv Albert's "from downtown!* and became a popular phrase in Puerto Rican jargon at the time.

Bracero performed for WAPA TV as a sportscaster until he retired during 2017. He has written various books and is also an engineer. He has interviewed many sports stars, and he has traveled often to do specials and documentaries for boxing fights, such as the one he did before the fight between Héctor Camacho and Edwin Rosario, and before Rosario's bout with Julio César Chávez.

On October 18, 2012, WAPA Television honored Bracero for being the station's main sportscaster during 30 years.

Also during 2012, Bracero, along with Juan González, Félix Trinidad, Felix Trinidad Sr. and others, became a member of the Puerto Rican Sports Hall of Fame.

== Personal ==
He is the son of Francisco Bracero Rodrıguez and Antonia Torres Clote.

== See also ==
- List of television reporters (Puerto Rico)
- List of Puerto Ricans
- Ernestito Díaz González
- Junior Abrams
- Manolo Rivera Morales
- Ramiro Martinez
- Fufi Santori
- Hector Vazquez Muñiz
