= List of Puerto Rican television series =

List of television shows made or popular in Puerto Rico

A list of television series broadcast and produced in Puerto Rico:

== Drama ==
- En un dia
- Color de Piel

== Children ==
- Atencion Atencion
- Burbujita y Bolillo
- Chicola y la ganga
- Chiqui chef
- El planeta de Remi
- La casa de Maria Chuzema
- Contra el reloj con Pacheco
- El tio Nobel
- Titi Chagua
- A toda maquina
- Sport Kids
- Veloz Mente
- Hi-5 Fiesta
- Cine Recreo con Pacheco
- La Tienda Mágica de Shabum

== Comedy ==
- Ahí Va Eso
- Al Aire Libre
- A Reirse con Fab
- A Reirse con Yoyo
- Atencion Atencion
- Cara o Cruz
- Carmelo y Punto
- Casos y Cosas de Casa
- Con Lo Que Cuenta Este País
- Cuqui
- Desafiando a los Genios
- Club sunshine
- El Barrio Cuatro Calles
- El Caso de la Mujer Asesinadita
- El Colegio de la Alegria
- El Condominio
- El Cuartel de la Risa
- El kiosco Budweiser
- El gran Bejuco
- El Profesor Colgate
- El Remix
- El Show de Chanita
- El Show de Raymond
- En Casa de Juanma y Wiwi
- En Familia
- Entrando por la Cocina
- Esto no es un Show
- Esto no Tiene Nombre
- Gaby, Fofó y Miliki
- Genovevo (Puerto Rico TV show)
- Ja ja, jiji, jo jo con Agrelot
- La Camara Comica
- La Criada
- La Criada Malcriada
- La Pareja Dispareja
- La Pension de Dona Tere
- La Taberna Budweiser
- La Taberna India
- Los Kakucómicos
- Los García
- Mapi y Papi
- Maripili
- No hay casa pa' tanta gente
- Mimicas del Monte
- Minga y Petraca
- Mi familia
- Mi Viejo y Yo
- Que Angelitos
- Que Vacilon
- Risas En Combo
- Sálvese quien Pueda
- Simpli la Secretaria
- Soltero y sin Compromiso
- Soy Awilda
- Sunshine's Cafe
- Sunshine Remix
- Teatrimundo
- Teatrilladas
- Elena Santos
- La casa del artista
- TV Ilegal
- TVO
- Wilson Wilson
- Raymond y sus Amigos

== Music and variety ==
- Almorzando con Ruth Fernández
- Aplausos: Hector Marcano
- Borinquen Canta: Guillermo José Torres
- Canta la Juventud: Alfred D. Herger, Lucecita Benítez & Chucho Avellanet
- Concierto: Cyd Marie Fleming & Hector Marcano
- Contigo Anexo 3 (Lou Briel, Dagmar)
- De Mujeres con Yolandita Monge
- Del Brazo de Ruth Fernández
- El Show de Carmita Jiménez
- El Show de Charytín
- El Show de Chucho Avellanet
- El Show de Ednita Nazario
- El Show de las 12:: Eddie Miró
- El Show de Iris Chacón
- El Show de Ivonne Coll
- El Show de Judy Gordon
- El show de Lissette
- El Show de Nydia Caro
- El Show de Olga y Tony
- El Show de Tito Rodríguez
- El Show Ford :: Tito Lara & Sonia Noemí
- El Show Libby's Luis Vigoreaux
- En Broma y en Serio :: Lou Briel & Dagmar
- Entre Amigos con Edgardo Huertas
- Estudio Alegre:: Juan Manuel Lebrón & Awilda Carbia
- Flash con Alejandro Primero
- Lo Mejor de la Semana:: Paquito Cordero
- Luis Vigoreaux Presenta:: Lydia Echevarría & Luis Vigoreaux
- Musicomedia:: Otilio Warrington, Dagmar, & Juan Manuel Lebrón
- Música en Dos Tiempos:: Gilbert Mamery
- Noche de Gala::: Eddie Miró & Marisol Malaret
- Noches de Café-Teatro:: Maria Falcon & Edgardo Huertas
- Pentagrama
- Nuestra Música tuvo varios animadores entre ellos, Jose Juan Tanon, Nydia Caro, Alejandro Primero, Lou Briel, Marisol Calero, Jose Miguel Class,(el gallito de Manati), Alwida la mimosa y Lunna.
- Rendezvous Nocturno:: Vilma Carbia
- Señoras y Señores:: Beba Franco & Chucho Avellanet
- Showtime:: Wilkins, Las Caribelles, Henry Lafont & El Casanova
- Super Show Goya:: Lillian Hurst & Enrique Maluenda;;
- Su Show Favorito:: Henry Lafont & El Casanova
- Voces en Función:: Lou Briel
- Yo soy el Gallo:: José Miguel Class & Awilda, La Mimosa
- Tenderete

== Cooking shows ==
- Cielito Rosado en Mediodia P.R.
- En la Cocina con Giovanna
- Entrando Por la Cocina
- Friendo y Comiendo (Luis Antonio Cosme & Bizcocho)
- Henry Corona & Carmen Despradel
- Pasteleria creativa
- Por la Cocina con Luisito y Bizcocho (hosted by Luisito Vigoreaux and Bizcocho)
- Operación Chef Piñeiro
- La cocina de Giovani
- Cocina Sano con Tony Newman

== Educational ==
- Abriendo Caminos
- Contra Viento y Marea (hosted by Sandra Zaiter)
- Cultura Viva hosted by Johanna Rosaly
- Desde mi pueblo (hosted by YoYo Boing, Deborah Carthy Deu and Maria Falcon)
- Nueva Economia

== Game shows ==
- Atrévete
- A Millón
- Agujero En La Pared (Acted by Jeff Sutphen, Teck Holmes and Gilberto Valenzuela)
- BrainSurge con Hoagie Numero 2
- Control Remoto (based on MTV's Remote Control and removed after MTV threatened to sue)
- Dale que Dale en Domingo
- Dame un Break
- El Tiempo es Oro con Mr. Cash
- Fantástico
- La Hora de Oro
- La Boveda De Teleonce
- Lo Tomas o lo Dejas
- Pa 'rriba Papi pa ' rriba
- Parejo, Doble y Triple
- Sabado en Grande
- Sube Nene, Sube!
- Super Sabados
- Ring ring gana!
- El Resuelve
- Y esto que es?
- Gana con Ganas
- Puerto Rico ¡Gana!

== News ==
- Hoy Día Puerto Rico
- Rayos X
- Las Noticias
- NotiCentro
- Noticentro al Amanecer
- Telenoticias
- NotiSeis
- En Vivo A Las Cinco
- Telemundo por la Mañana
- En la Mañana

== Events ==
- Premios Kids Choice
- Premios Hall Of Game

== Fit ==
- Moverlo movimiento

== Reality shows ==
- Janid: Atrediva
- Objetivo Fama
- La musa de Carlos Alberto
- La casa de cristal
- Idol Puerto Rico
- Juventud 83
- Kids Choice Sports (Acted by Yaire, Mariano Chiesa, Edgardo Huertas, Jacobo Morales and Kuki Sanban "Numero 3")
- Guerreros

== Virals ==
- Acciones Mejores y Videos (Acted by Jeremy Shada)
- Los Mejores Videos (Acted by Collin Dean)

== Sports ==
- Baloncesto Superior Nacional
- Boxeo de Campeones
- De Todo un Poco- Ramiro Martinez
- Las Carreras
- NWE Explosion
- WWC Superestrellas de la Lucha Libre
- IWA Impacto Total
- IWA Zona Caliente

== Talk shows ==
- Levantate!
- Aqui Estamos con Herman O' Neil y Shanira Blanco
- Al Grano con Zervigon
- Jovet, Controversial
- El Show de Tommy
- En Serio con Silverio
- Escenario para la Vida
- Ellas Al Mediodia
- Lío
- Mucho Gusto
- Ojeda Sin Limite
- A Calzón Quita'o
- Ahora Podemos Hablar
- Monica en confianza
- Dimelo
- Myrna, Chispi y la gente de hoy
- Ruben Sanchez directo
- Contigo
- La batalla de los sexos
- Jugando Pelota Dura
- Los datos son los datos con Jay Fonseca
- Cuarto Poder
- El Poder del Pueblo
- Primera Pregunta con Rafael Lenin Lopez

== Variety ==
- Alexandra a las 12
- Pegate al Mediodia
- Día a Día con Raymond y Dagmar
- DavidSo El Show! (Acted by DavidSo)
- Fenomenal con Hector Marcano
- Levantate
- El Super Show
- El Show De Jojo Siwa (Acted by Jojo Siwa)
- Entre nosotras
- La Comay
- Anda pa'l cara
- No te duermas
- Pegate al mediodia
- Buscados
- Que suerte que es domingo
- Lo sé todo
- PR En Vivo

== Teen drama ==
- El Show de Los Chicos
- Juventud 82 (and 83, 84 and so on)
- La Hora de Menudo
- Party Time
- Teenager's Matinee
- Canta la Juventud
- Dos A-go-go
- Discoteca Pepsi
- Kaleidoscopio
- La clase del 90
- La Factoría Eléctrica
- La Ola Nueva (con Millie Corretjer)
- Zona Y
- Punky Brewster 1980s

== Spanish soap operas ==
- Ahora O Nunca - Now or Never
- Al Son Del Amor (Vendida en 34 países de América Europa y Asia) - To the beat of Love
- Amor De Mad - Mother's Love
- Anacaona
- Ante la Ley - Before the Law- Figurative Wanderer
- Ariana
- Aventurera (Vendida en 17 países de América) - Adventurer
- Bodas de Odio - Weddings of Hate
- Cadenas de Amor - Chains of Love
- Consciencia Culpable - Guilty Conscience
- Coralito (Viewed in over 30 countries) - Little Coral
- Cristina Bazan (viewed in over 25 countries)
- Cuando los Hijos Condenan - When the Children Condemn
- Diana Carolina - Dianne Caroline
- Don amor
- Dueña y Señora - Owner (possibly "Mistress") and Lady (title infers a sharp contrast)
- El Amor Nuestro de Cada Día - Our Love of Every Day
- El Gran Amante - The Great Lover
- El Hijo de Angela Maria -The Son of Angela Mary
- El Idolo - The Idol
- El Retrato de Angela - Angela's Portrait
- En Aquella Playa (Transmitido en USA Vzla Col Ecu Perú Chile Arg Pan Mex PR y Esp) - At that Beach
- Escandalo (Viewed in over 15 countries) - Scandal
- Good American Family
- Julieta - Juliet
- Karina Montaner
- La Isla - The Island
- La Jibarita - The peasant or country girl
- La Sombra de Belinda - The Shadow of Belinda
- La Verdadera Eva - The Real Eve
- Laura Guzman, culpable - Laura Guzmán, Guilty
- Los Dedos de la Mano - The Fingers on the Hand
- Los Robles - The Robusts
- Milly
- Modelos SA (Vendida en 15 países de América) - Models, South America
- Mujeres sin Hombre - Women without a man
- Poquita Cosa - Little Thing
- Posada Corazón - Love Hearth
- Pueblo Chico - Small Town
- Renzo, el gitano - Renzo, the Gypsy
- Secretos De Mujer - Woman's Secrets
- Señora Tentacion (Vendida en 40 países de Latinoamérica U.S.A. Europa Asia y Países Arabes) - Lady Temptation
- Tanairi (Viewed in over 35 countries, number one in Santa Esperanza - Holy Hope
- Tomiko - Japanese name
- Tormento - Rage
- Tres Destinos (Vendida en 55 países de Latinoamérica U.S.A. Europa Asia y Países Arabes) - Three Destinies
- Una Pasión En El Espejo - Passion in the mirror
- Vida - Life
- Viernes Social (Vendida en 17 países de América) - Social Friday
- Vivir para Amar - Live to love
- Vivir Para Ti - Living for You
- Yo Sé Que Mentía - I know he was lying
