= List of programs previously broadcast by TeleOnce =

This is a list of television programs once broadcast by TeleOnce that have ended their runs on the network.

== News/public affairs programming ==
=== Edición Puerto Rico (2018, 2021) ===
In March 2018, the network announced plans to restore a news program with the creation of Edición Puerto Rico. The program is a 30-minute no-anchor, voiceover, videotaped newscast which, in addition to being broadcast in Puerto Rico, is shown on many Univision-affiliate stations owned by Entravision (such as Boston, Orlando, and Tampa) and Unimás owned-and-operated stations in New York, Chicago, Philadelphia, Raleigh, and Atlanta. It airs on weekday mornings, except in Puerto Rico, where it airs weeknights at 11 p.m. (the first local-themed newscast at that timeslot since the news department shutdown in 2014). On March 8, 2021, the newscast returned as Edición Puerto Rico, and aired weekdays at 5:30 p.m. (25 minutes) and 10 p.m. (60 minutes). The final newscast produced at the studios of WOLE-DT in Aguadilla aired on July 9, 2021.

=== Edición Digital Puerto Rico (2019–2021) ===
After more than five years without newscasts, WLII-DT aired a 60-minute local news program called Edición Digital Puerto Rico, similar to WKAQ-TV and WAPA-TV's news offerings. This newscast was produced at the studios of sister station WOLE-DT in Aguadilla, and started on April 22, 2019, and ended on March 5, 2021. The newscast focused on events happening in and around Puerto Rico and the United States, and interacted with viewers through social media platforms. The program also aired on WOLE, Facebook Live, and Univision Puerto Rico's mobile app and website.

=== En Alerta (2024–2025) ===
After the abrupt ending of the La Comay show in December 2023, TeleOnce needed a new show for the 5:55 p.m. time slot. On January 5, 2024, the station announced the new show would be called En Alerta ("On Alert") and would feature extraordinary stories and unexpected situations, the format of the program is compared to that of Primer Impacto and Al Rojo Vivo. On January 10, 2024, TeleOnce announced that the show would be hosted by Jessica Serrano (who also works as a reporter on El Poder Del Pueblo) and Yan Ruiz (who was La Comay's sidekick before the show's abrupt ending). The show premiered on January 15, 2024, at 5:55 p.m. and has a duration of 35 minutes due to TeleOnce's decision to add an extra half-hour to Jugando Pelota Dura and have that show start at 6:30 p.m.

On July 30, 2024, En Alerta moved to the 8:30 p.m. time slot due to the return of La Comay to the show's original time slot of 6 p.m. En Alerta remained at that time slot until January 13, 2025, when La Boveda de Teleonce returned to the network for a new season. The final episode of En Alerta aired on January 10, 2025.

=== Other ===
- Despierta Puerto Rico (April 3, 2017 – 2018)
- Los Seis de la Tarde (April 27, 2015 – October 2017)
- Notanserio Univision (February 26, 2017 – April 9, 2017)

== Talk/reality shows ==
=== Acuéstate con Francis (2021–2022) ===
On June 11, 2021, WLII announced the surprise signing of Puerto Rican comedian Francis Rosas, who had worked as part of comedy projects on WAPA-TV for over 20 years. The deal with Rosas allowed the comedian to launch his own comedy show with him serving as executive producer and his production company (Rosas and Pitbull, Co.) working alongside WLII's owner, Liberman Media Group, in the production of other future projects.

At the time of Rosas' signing with WLII, the comedian was still under contract with WAPA-TV's Sanco Productions, owned by actor and comedian Sunshine Logroño. On July 2, 2021, Logroño and his wife Gilda Santini sued Francis Rosas and his production company for breach of contract (Rosas had signed a two-year extension to his contract with WAPA-TV in January 2021); additionally, the lawsuit asked Rosas to pay $100,000 in damages and included a request for the court to prohibit Rosas from appearing on any television network until the end of his deal in October 2022. On July 15, 2021, The First Instance Court of San Juan denied the injunction by Logroño to prohibit Rosas from appearing on any other television network until 2022, stating: "The court recognized an artists' liberty of working where they pleased."

On September 27, 2021, it was announced that the title of Rosas' upcoming show would be Acuéstate con Francis ("Go to Bed with Francis"). The show's premiere date was scheduled for October 11, 2021, at 10 p.m. Rosas described the show as a family show that would follow a late-night talk show format, featuring sketches, interviews, and games with a variety of guests and a live studio audience. The show officially premiered on October 11, 2021, featuring guests Félix Trinidad, Celimar Adames Casalduc, and musical guest Nio Garcia who performed his single "Tus Poses". The premiere also featured special appearances by Danilo Beauchamp and Alejandro Gil, who worked alongside Rosas on WAPA-TV; the duo teased joining Rosas on WLII in the future.

On July 13, 2022, WLII-DT operator Liberman Media Group canceled the show. The final episode aired on July 15, 2022, and featured Rosas' comedy partners Danilo Beuchamp and Alejandro Gil, urban artist Alejo, and influencer Andrea Ojeda Cruz "La Peki" as guests; it closed with the show's house band playing the chorus to Chumbawamba's "Tubthumping". Rosas is expected to continue to work with the station and will develop a new show through his production company.

=== La Comay (2021–2024) ===
Upon the relaunch of the network as TeleOnce in 2021, Liberman Media Group announced they had acquired the La Comay show from Mega TV. La Comay began airing on TeleOnce on March 1, 2021 on its usual time slot of 5:55 p.m. immediately after Las Noticias

During the December 2, 2023 show, Kobbo Santarosa through La Comay announced that the show would be ending at the end of the month. Santarrosa affirmed that he was not being pushed out but rather choosing to retire, something the network backed on their statement in which they said they too were surprised by the announcement. La Comay's last episode aired on December 22, 2023.

On April 22, 2024 TeleOnce began advertising the return of La Comay, the network said the show was coming back for "one final season, due to popular demand". La Comay returned on August 5, 2024 with new cohost Rocky The Kid, this "final season" of the show ran until January 31, 2025 when the character announced that the show was ending once again and that day's episode would be the last.

=== Other ===
- ¡Ahora Es! (May 7, 2018 – January 14, 2021)
- ¡Ahora es que es! (March 8, 2021 – July 30, 2021)
- Buen Viaje
- Dale Replay (February 17, 2017 – March 24, 2017)
- Desafío Super Regiones (January 18, 2021 – March 5, 2021)
- Estos Dos Sin Frenos (April 4, 2016 – October 7, 2018)
- Familias frente al fuego (July 21, 2019 – August 25, 2019)
- Inseparables: Amor al límite (May 27, 2019 – August 15, 2019)
- La gran sorpresa (January 14, 2018 – February 18, 2018)
- La Noche Encima (March 7, 2016 – June 23, 2017)
- Noche de Luz (August 13, 2017 – September 5, 2020)
- Reina de la Canción (September 22, 2019 – November 24, 2019)
- Resistiré (October 19, 2019 – November 7, 2020)
- Reto 4 Elementos: Naturaleza Extrema (April 7, 2018 – May 8, 2019)
- Sal y pimienta (September 17, 2010 – February 12, 2017)
- Tarde en la noche con Luis González (May 5, 2018 – October 17, 2020)
- Una Buena Tarde (February 8, 2016 – October 2017)
- La Banda (September 13, 2015 – December 11, 2016)
- Va por ti (September 7, 2014 – September 4, 2016)
- Yo soy un gamer (May 5, 2018 – January 16, 2021)

== Game shows ==
=== Pa' Ganar y Reir con Teleonce (2024–2025) ===
On January 30, 2024, TeleOnce announced a change in their daytime schedule with the addition of a new game show. The show would be titled Pa' Ganar y Reir con TeleOnce ("To win and laugh with TeleOnce") and would be hosted by Luis "Finito" Fontánez (who also serves as co-host of La Bóveda de Teleonce) and Wanda Sais (who joins from, WAPA). The show will be based on presenting games that viewers can play from their home by calling into the show. Pa' Ganar y Reir will take over PR En Vivo's old time slot of weekdays at 12:30 p.m., right after Las Noticias and will only have a half hour duration. Veteran actor Adrián García is also expected to join the show to act alongside Sais in comedy sketches.

On January 13, 2025, 'Pa Ganar y Reir was "merged" with PR En Vivo thus ending the run of the show. The final episode aired on January 10, 2025.

=== La Boveda de Teleonce (2021–2025) ===
Premiering on March 1, 2022, from TeleOnce's new studio facility at The Mall of San Juan, as La Boveda de Mr. Cash (Mr. Cash's Vault) the game show was initially hosted by Josue Carrión and featured a series of games where participants would try and win cash prizes and an opportunity to enter The Vault where they would have 30 seconds to retrieve prizes such as electronics, home appliances and more. Initially scheduled to premiere on January 31, the date was pushed back,

On August 5, 2022, WLII announced that La Boveda would move to prime time—starting August 22, 2022, the show would air at 8 p.m., following Jugando Pelota Dura. It was also announced that Josué Carrión would not continue as host and the show would be renamed La Boveda ("The Vault"); co-hosts Andrea Rivera, Luis Fontánez "Finito", and Awilda Herrera continued hosting the show after Carrión's exit and were joined by musician Andres Waldemar as co-host.

The new version of the show, which premiered on August 22, 2022, featured the introduction of "TeleBingo", a live bingo game where the audience watching at home got to play using bingo cards distributed through the local newspaper El Vocero and local supermarkets and restaurants. The prize is $1,000 for the winner of the live bingo game but if there's no winner by the end of the week that prize money will continue to double until there is a winner.

On June 27, 2023, host Andres Waldemar announced through his social media pages that he would no longer be hosting La Bóveda after almost one year on the show. The network announced that comedian Danilo Beauchamp would take over as host of the show.

On August 20, 2025 it was announced that show would be airing its final episode later that week. Although at first it was billed as a season finale, it was later confirmed that the show had been effectively canceled as part of a cost cutting measure at TeleOnce. La Bóveda aired its final episode on August 22, 2025.

=== Other ===
- Recuerda y Gana (October 2, 2016 – 2017)
- Al final todo queda en familia (May 6, 2018 – July 8, 2018)

== News Programming ==
- Noticiero Univision
- Primer Impacto

== Telenovelas ==
- Abismo de pasión (May 7, 2012 – January 3, 2013)
- Amar a muerte (January 14, 2019 – April 18, 2019)
- A.mar, donde el amor teje sus redes
- Amor de barrio (May 16, 2016 – September 26, 2016)
- Apocalipsis (March 2, 2020 – July 3, 2020)
- A que no me dejas (July 31, 2017 – May 7, 2018)
- Bloque de búsqueda (April 2, 2017 – February 10, 2018)
- Caer en tentación (January 15, 2018 – May 31, 2018)
- Cita a ciegas (September 14, 2020 – December 21, 2020)
- Despertar contigo (September 19, 2016 – February 13, 2017)
- Diseñando tu amor (May 31, 2021 – July 6, 2021)
- Dulce ambición (November 16, 2020 – May 7, 2021)
- El color de la pasión (March 29, 2017 – June 23, 2017)
- El Dragón (October 21, 2019 – February 21, 2020)
- El hotel de los secretos (January 31, 2016 – May 24, 2016)
- El regreso de Lucas (April 15, 2017 – February 10, 2018)
- El Rico y Lázaro (May 1, 2018 – November 19, 2018)
- Enamorándome de Ramón (February 5, 2018 – May 4, 2018)
- Esta historia me suena
- Guardian: The Lonely and Great God
- ¿Qué culpa tiene Fatmagül? (July 6, 2020 – January 15, 2021)
- Huérfanos de su tierra (August 2, 2021 – December 3, 2021)
- Imperio de mentiras (January 18, 2021 – May 28, 2021)
- Juegos de amor y poder
- La bella y las bestias (June 18, 2018 – October 1, 2018)
- La candidata (August 8, 2017 – January 12, 2018)
- La doble vida de Estela Carrillo (January 2, 2018 – April 12, 2018)
- La esquina del diablo (June 15, 2015 – September 21, 2015)
- La que no podía amar (February 20, 2012 – October 9, 2012)
- La Madrastra (June 27, 2005 – December 15, 2005; July 19, 2021 – January 4, 2022, rerun)
- La Piloto (April 17, 2017 – August 7, 2017, season 1; October 8, 2018 – January 10, 2019, season 2)
- La reina de Indias y el conquistador (June 14, 2021 – August 6, 2021)
- La reina soy yo (June 17, 2019 – October 14, 2019)
- La rosa de Guadalupe
- La Tierra Prometida (August 7, 2017 – April 30, 2018)
- La verdad oculta (September 11, 2006 – March 3, 2007)
- Lady, la vendedora de rosas (September 22, 2015 – January 15, 2016; April 1, 2017 – March 31, 2018, rerun)
- Las amazonas (April 16, 2018 – July 12, 2018)
- Like (December 9, 2018 – December 8, 2019)
- Lo imperdonable (September 15, 2015 – March 10, 2016)
- Los elegidos (November 14, 2020 – July 24, 2021)
- Love Divina (November 6, 2017 – February 2, 2018)
- Los Díez Mandamientos (May 2, 2016 – September 8, 2016, season 1; February 14, 2017 – May 18, 2017, season 2)
- Me declaro culpable (February 24, 2020 – May 22, 2020)
- Médicos (August 4, 2020 – November 15, 2020)
- Mi adorable maldición (May 1, 2017 – February 2, 2018)
- Mi marido tiene familia (January 21, 2019 – June 7, 2019, season 1; July 23, 2019 – February 28, 2020, season 2)
- Muchacha italiana viene a casarse (February 8, 2016 – May 24, 2016)
- Mujeres de negro (October 29, 2016 – June 4, 2017)
- Papá a toda madre (January 15, 2018 – June 14, 2018)
- Papás por conveniencia
- Pasión y poder (June 27, 2016 – January 6, 2017)
- Por amar sin ley (June 4, 2018 – October 5, 2018, season 1; April 22, 2019 – August 27, 2019, season 2)
- Por ella soy Eva (April 9, 2012 – December 6, 2012; September 29, 2016 – March 28, 2017, rerun)
- Ringo (March 30, 2020 – May 29, 2020)
- Simplemente María (July 16, 2018 – January 17, 2019)
- Si nos dejan (July 12, 2021 – November 5, 2021)
- Sin tu mirada (June 10, 2019 – November 19, 2019)
- Sueño de amor (June 6, 2016 – September 6, 2016)
- Te acuerdas de mí (March 29, 2021 – July 9, 2021)
- Te doy la vida (May 25, 2020 – August 3, 2020)
- Tormenta en el paraíso (November 2, 2009 – July 28, 2010)
- Totalmente Diva (June 26, 2017 – April 11, 2018)
- Tres Milagros (March 30, 2019 – October 12, 2019)
- Tres veces Ana (September 6, 2016 – February 1, 2017)
- Un camino hacia el destino (September 6, 2016 – January 4, 2017)
- Vencer el desamor (November 10, 2020 – March 26, 2021)
- Vino el amor (June 26, 2017 – January 1, 2018)
- Volver a caer
- Yago (July 11, 2016 – September 26, 2016)
- Y mañana será otro día (May 25, 2020 – September 9, 2020)
- Yo no creo en los hombres (March 7, 2016 – July 8, 2016)
- Zeynep (April 22, 2019 – June 14, 2019, season 1; October 15, 2019 – February 21, 2020, season 2)

== Television series ==
- 9-1-1 (March 10, 2019 – August 2, 2020)
- Agents of S.H.I.E.L.D. (May 15, 2018 – February 1, 2020)
- Covert Affairs (January 3, 2016 – March 25, 2017)
- Cuna de lobos (January 12, 2020 – May 9, 2020)
- Demente criminal (April 1, 2015 – June 11, 2015)
- Descontrol (January 7, 2018 – February 4, 2018)
- Dogma (May 17, 2018 – August 9, 2018)
- El Chapo (April 23, 2017 – July 25, 2018)
- El Princípe (September 27, 2016 – December 7, 2016; February 17, 2018 – August 11, 2018)
- Esta historia me suena (July 27, 2019 – October 12, 2019)
- Falsos falsificados (August 18, 2018 – January 26, 2019)
- Heroes Reborn (February 6, 2016 – February 25, 2017)
- Jesús (November 26, 2018 – July 22, 2019)
- José de Egipto (June 26, 2017 – August 7, 2017)
- La Embajada (February 4, 2017 – April 1, 2017)
- La Madame (January 20, 2015 – March 31, 2015)
- La usurpadora (September 16, 2019 – October 18, 2019)
- La viuda negra 2 (July 10, 2016 – March 26, 2017)
- Los milagros de Jesús (May 22, 2017 – June 25, 2017)
- Los Mosqueteros (June 4, 2017 – 2018)
- Los Simpsons (October 13, 2015 – October 18, 2020)
- Metástasis (October 20, 2014 – January 19, 2015)
- Niño Santo (August 2, 2015 – August 23, 2015, first-run; January 18, 2016 – January 29, 2016, rerun)
- No me compares (August 30, 2018 – November 22, 2018)
- Por siempre Joan Sebastian (September 24, 2016 – November 19, 2016)
- Quantico (May 16, 2018 – February 1, 2020)
- Rubí (February 24, 2020 – March 26, 2020)
- Ruta 35 (January 21, 2016 – March 11, 2016)
- Sansón y Dalila (July 28, 2019 – September 15, 2019)
- Sin miedo a la verdad (October 19, 2019 – May 9, 2020)
- Soy Luna (June 4, 2017 – May 20, 2018)
- Su Nombre Era Dolores (January 22, 2017 – April 16, 2017)
- The Resident (May 19, 2019 – August 30, 2020)
- This Is Us (March 10, 2019 – October 18, 2020)
- Velvet (October 3, 2016 – March 18, 2019)

== Comedy programming ==
- 40 y 20 (July 30, 2017 – 2018)
- Los González (May 6, 2017 – 2018)
- Mi lista de exes (March 16, 2019 – April 27, 2019)
- Mita y mita (August 3, 2019 – October 26, 2019)
- Renta congelada (December 8, 2018 – April 27, 2019)
- Simón dice (May 4, 2019 – July 27, 2019)
- Vecinos
- La familia P. Luche
- La Hora de la Risa
- El Chavo del Ocho
- El Chapulín Colorado
- Nosotros los guapos

== Children’s programming ==
- Ángeles (November 5, 2017 – March 1, 2020)
- Atención Atención (November 8, 2009 – January 10, 2021)
- Dragones: Carrera al borde (January 19, 2020 – September 20, 2020)
- Fairy Tales (June 4, 2017 - February 28, 2021)
- Las Aventuras de Pocketville (November 5, 2017 – March 1, 2020)
- Nikki
- The Avatars (March 8, 2018 – April 19, 2020)
- Woki Tokis (September 9, 2018 – June 2, 2019)
- Zona Y

== Game shows ==
- Lo tomas o lo dejas
- Juego de voces

== Sports Programming ==
- WWC Las Super Estrellas de la Lucha Libre (1973 - 1980 ,1986 - 1990)
- NBA Jam
- FIFA Club World Cup
- CONCACAF Gold Cup

== Awards ==
- Premios Lo Nuestro
- Premios Juventud
- Latin Grammy Awards
- Latin American Music Awards
