= Rayos X =

Puerto Rican investigative journalism program

- Logo
- Created by: Tony Mojena; Jay Fonseca
- Presented by: Yolanda Velez Arcelay; Valeria Collazo; Adriana de Jesus Salaman; Jose Carlos Sanchez; Ángel Rosa
- Country of origin: Puerto Rico
- Original language: Spanish

Production
- Executive producer: Tony Mojena
- Production company: Tony Mojena Entertainment

Original release
- Network: Telemundo Puerto Rico
- Release: October 13, 2015 – present

Related
- Dia a Dia

Rayos X (X-Rays), formerly known as "Jay y sus Rayos X", is an investigative journalism program that airs on Telemundo Puerto Rico every Tuesday at 10:00 p.m.

The program was created by producer Tony Mojena and television personality and political analyst Jay Fonseca as a way to deep dive into local Puerto Rican politics and sociopolitical issues on the island. In 2021, Fonseca left the show to start another similar program on WAPA (Cuarto Poder). The show is currently hosted by journalists Yolanda Velez Arcelay and Valeria Collazo Cañizares.

== History ==
=== Jay y sus Rayos X (2015-2021) ===
Jay Fonseca had hosted a political analysis and interview segment on the daytime talk show Dia a Dia called "De Frente con Jay Fonseca" (Upfront with Jay Fonseca) for years on Telemundo Puerto Rico before the station agreed to produce a spinoff of the segment as an investigative journalism program. The show was originally announced in December 2013 during the stations upfront presentation and it was meant to premiere in 2014 but the production was delayed and the show did not premiere until fall 2015. In September 2015, Telemundo announced the premiere of the show would finally take place on October 13, 2015. The show's premiere took place on a Tuesday immediately after Raymond y sus Amigos but the station announced that the show was scheduled to air Thursdays at 9:00 p.m. thereafter.

Fonseca would host alongside a crop of new journalists such as Tatiana Ortiz (now a reporter for NotiCentro on WAPA), Valeria Collazo and Alexandra Acosta. In 2016, just a year after the show's premiere Telemundo would announce that the show would move permanently to Tuesdays at 10:00 p.m. to create a block of 4 hours of live original local programming which would feature Raymond y sus Amigos (which would serve as the show's lead-in), Jay y sus Rayos X and Telenoticias (the station's newscast). The show officially moved to its new time on July 12, 2016.

On October 29, 2020, the show hosted the final debate ahead of the 2020 Puerto Rican general election. The special called Jay y sus Rayos X: La última opportunidad (Jay and his X Rays: Last Chance) featured Pedro Pierluisi, Carlos Delgado Altieri, Alexandra Lúgaro, Eliezer Molina and Cesar Vazquez and was focused on asking the candidates questions related to corruption and proposals for growth of the island.

On July 15, 2021, Jay Fonseca officially declined to renew his contract and would leave both Rayos X and Dia a Dia effective immediately. Fonseca's came after an offer from rival station WAPA where he now hosts a daily show called Los datos son los datos (Facts are Facts) and a weekly investigative journalism show called Cuarto Poder (Fourth Power).

With Fonseca's exit questions arose about Rayos X's future. Executive producer Tony Mojena and Telemundo Puerto Rico president Jose Cancela quickly announced that the show would continue and that they were actively searching for a new host and new team of journalists. It was announced that the show would be moving forward as just Rayos X (dropping Fonseca's name) and that for the foreseeable future the show would be hosted by the remaining journalists on the show Valeria Collazo, Shaína Cabán and John Paul Vallenilla. The first episode of the show without Fonseca aired on Telemundo on July 19, 2021, and the remaining hosts thanked Fonseca on-air wishing him the best in his future projects.

=== Rayos X (2021-present) ===
On August 16, 2021, Telemundo announced the new team of the revamped the show. During the announcement it was revealed that veteran journalist Yolanda Velez Arcelay would be taking over as host of the show. Arcelay was making the jump from TeleOnce where she served as a long time field reporter for the initial version of Las Noticias and later as a regular panel member on Jugando Pelota Dura. Valeria Collazo Cañizares, Shaina Caban, John Paul Vallenilla and Alexandra Acosta, all whom had been with the show with since its inception, would also remain as part of the show. Also joining the show would be lawyers Ernie Cabán and Osvaldo Carlo who would be in charge of providing legal analysis of high-profile cases that are discussed on the show. The first episode of this new version of the show aired on August 17, 2021.

On May 25, 2022, it was announced that journalist Adriana de Jesus Salman would be joining the program as part of the investigative team.

On December 20, 2022, it was announced on the program that journalist, José Carlos Sánchez would also be joining the program's investigative unit. As part of the investigative unit both José and Adriana would produce their own dedicated pieces and present the segments of these pieces on the show.

On January 26, 2023, it was announced that, legal analyst and lawyer, Leo Aldridge would be joining the program. Aldridge had worked previously as a panelist on Jugando Pelota Dura and as an analyst for WAPA's newscast NotiCentro. Aldridge would host his own segment called Asi lo Leo (That's how I read it) where he would do a quick dive into a local political subject of his choice.

On June 28, 2023, Shaina Cabán announced through her Instagram page that she had was officially leaving the show. Cabán also served as one of the producers of the show. Cabán joined John Paul Vallenilla and Alexandra Acosta who also quietly left the show during 2023.

In August 2023, Rayos X got nominated for an Emmy Award. The nomination came off the special report titled "Decoding AI: Opportunities, Dangers, and Ethical Imperatives" and presented by José Carlos Sanchez. The piece won the award during the ceremony held in December 2023.

== On-air staff ==
=== Current on-air staff ===
- Yolanda Velez Arcelay, host
- Valeria Collazo Cañizares, reporter and co-host
- Adriana de Jesus Salaman, reporter and co-host
- José Carlos Sanchez, reporter and co-host
- Ángel Rosa, political analyst

=== Former on-air staff ===
- Jay Fonseca, host (now at WAPA)
- Tatiana Ortiz, reporter (now at WAPA)
- Shaina Caban, reporter
- John Paul Vallenilla, reporter (now at Cadena Salsoul)
- Christian Claudio, reporter
- Ana Valeria Iturbe, reporter
- Alexandra Acosta, panelist
- Ernie Cabán, panelist (now at WKAQ 580)
- Osvaldo Carlo, panelist (now at WAPA and WKAQ 580)
- Leo Aldridge, political analyst
