= Puerto Rico ¡Gana! =

Puerto Rican game show

- Logo
- Genre: Game show
- Created by: Adolfo Ontivero
- Presented by: Alex DJ; Jeananthony "Chino" Medina
- Country of origin: Puerto Rico
- Original language: Spanish

Production
- Executive producer: Adolfo Ontivero
- Production locations: Eddie Miro Studio at WKAQ-TV, San Juan, Puerto Rico
- Running time: 60 minutes (2019-2021); 120 minutes (2021-present)
- Production company: TeleMania

Original release
- Network: Telemundo Puerto Rico
- Release: May 13, 2019 – present

Puerto Rico ¡Gana! (Puerto Rico Wins!) is a Puerto Rican game show that airs on Mondays, Wednesdays, Thursdays, Fridays and, Sundays at 6:00 p.m. on Telemundo Puerto Rico. The show is hosted by Alexis Colón who is known as Alex DJ and by Jeananthony Medina.

Each show features a variety of games where contestants from the show's audience or watching at home can win cash prizes.

== History ==
WKAQ-TV has a wide history of showcasing a variety of game shows on the prime time schedule such as Dame un Break, Atrevete, and, Que Suerte. In the early 2000s WKAQ-TV stopped producing local programming thus canceling their game show line up. On April 24, 2019, nearly 15 years after the cancellation of Dame un Break and Atrevete, Telemundo Puerto Rico announced they were premiering a new game show as part of their prime time line and the show would be called Puerto Rico ¡Gana!. The premiere of Puerto Rico ¡Gana! was set for May 13, 2019, and the show would air 4 days a week (Mondays, Wednesdays, Thursdays and Fridays) live at 8:00 p.m.. The show does not air on Tuesdays because that day the station airs Raymond y sus Amigos live at 8:00 p.m.

On August 16, 2019, Puerto Rico ¡Gana! ended its "first season" and Telemundo Puerto Rico announced the show was renewed to stay permanently on the prime time schedule moving forward. For the remainder of the year Puerto Rico ¡Gana! would move to the 7:00 p.m. time slot and serve as a lead in for the popular competition reality program Exatlón.

Starting on October 25, 2020, Puerto Rico ¡Gana! began airing on Sundays, this move would mean the show would air 5 days a week (with the show being off the air on Tuesdays and Saturdays).

On May 10, 2021, on the verge of the show's second anniversary, Telemundo Puerto Rico announced that it would expanding Puerto Rico ¡Gana! to a two-hour show and that it would now air live 5 days a week from 6:00 p.m. to 8:00 p.m. immediately following the station's newscasts Telenoticias.

The original cast and crew of Puerto Rico ¡Gana! included Alex DJ as host and Pepe Calderón and Luis "Finito" Fontanez as co-hosts with both Calderón and "Finito" hosting their own segments and their own games on occasion on the program. Both men eventually would get offers to host their own shows based on their work on Puerto Rico ¡Gana!, "Finito" left the show in March 2022 as he would go on to become one of the hosts of La Boveda de Teleonce and Calderón would leave the show in August 2023 to host TeleOnce's new morning show En La Mañana.

On May 12, 2023, the show celebrated its fourth anniversary. As part of the celebration Telemundo Puerto Rico revealed that it had remodeled and expanded the studio space of the show at the Studio Eddie Miro in the network's facilities in San Juan. With the new expansion the show could now welcome an audience of 150 people into the studio, something the show had not been able to do since the start of the COVID-19 pandemic in March 2020.

On October 10, 2023, Jeananthony "Chino" Medina joined Puerto Rico ¡Gana! as a co-host of the show. Medina was a contestant and occasional guest host on the show Guerreros (Warriors) a physical competition reality show that aired on WAPA directly opposite of Puerto Rico ¡Gana!. Upon the cancellation of Warriors on August 31, 2023, "Chino" announced his move to Telemundo and was introduced as co-host of Puerto Rico ¡Gana! in October by Alex DJ and producer Alfonso Ontivero.

== Games ==
Puerto Rico ¡Gana! presents a variety of games where members of the in-studio audience or watching at home can win cash prizes. Most of the games on the show carry a major sponsor who's credited with the prize money given during the game. Some of these games are:

- El Memory de McDonald's (McDonald's Memory) - A live version of the Concentration (card game) where contestants choose cards from the big screen on stage. Contestants earn $20 for each correct guess. Sponsored by McDonalds Puerto Rico.
- ¿Quien Dijo? (Who said that?) - Host, Alex DJ, reads quotes or song lyrics and the contestant has to guess who said the quote or performs the song he's quoting. The contestant with the most correct guesses wins $200. Sponsored by MMM Medicare.
- El Sabelotodo (The Know-it-alls) - Trivia game where contestants answer a set of multiple choice questions. Contestants must buzz in to answer the questions. This game is played in a tournament style and whomever wins has to return on the next episode to compete against other winners of previous episodes. During the school year this game is open to high school seniors classes and it is presented as "Los Graduandos" (The Graduating). The winner of the tournament earns a prize of $10,000. Sponsored by NUC University.
- La Muralla (The Wall) - A giant version of the game Jenga where contestants must push blocks off a giant wall without the wall crumbling. The winner earns $200.
- La Planta (The Generator) - Contestants line up and pick a key to open a lock that's protecting a power generator. The contestant that picks the right key and opens the lock wins the power generator. Sponsored by TuPlantaPR.Com
- Abre la puerta (Open the door) - Contestants line up and pick a key to open a locked door. The contestant that picks the right key and opens the door wins a cash prize. Sponsored by Rooms To Go.
- ¿Cuantos Hay? (How many are there?) - Contestants watching at home can call in and guess how many items are inside a shopping basket. Winner earns $200. Sponsored by All Ways 99.
- Empuja El Carrito (Push the cart) - Contestants line up to push a cart full of groceries to a designated spot on the set. The contestants that lands the cart on the spot perfectly wins all the groceries in the cart. Sponsored by Supermercados Selectos.

=== Open Talent Show ===
During the second hour of the show the Open Talent Show takes place. During this portion of the program three contestants will take the stage and perform a song, based on their performance the audience at home will vote on who had the better performance through a poll on Telemundo Puerto Rico's website. Whomever wins the poll moves on to the next round where the winner will face off against other winners until through the process of elimination through voting there's a winner. The winner of the singing competition earns $10,000. The latest winner of the competition was Liz Carrasquillo from the town of Naguabo who was crowned the winner on January 3, 2024. The contestants who came in on second and third place received a $1,000 cash prize. This portion of the program is sponsored by Caesars Sportsbook who were also responsible for providing the prize money.

== Controversies ==
In August 2023, a contestant went on the show and expressed to host, Alex DJ, that he was struggling. The contestant said he was living out of his car and was in desperate need of a job. DJ out of kindness offered to put the contestant's telephone number on the screen and encouraged anyone watching the show to call if they had a serious job offer they could present to the contestant as a way to help him get back on his feet. The production of the show also gave the contestant $500 to help him get back on his feet. Days later, the contestant was arrested by the Puerto Rican police for allegedly being in possession of a stolen car. The police report indicates that the contestant had stolen the car from a woman in Guayama, Puerto Rico, he's also accused of stealing $600 during the altercation. Following the incident DJ said on the show he did not regret helping the man and that he forgave the man for the incident. DJ expressed that he felt inclined to help even more people in spite of the incident.

On August 29, 2023, an active shooter situation left two brothers dead at the Caguas Courthouse. The shooting came about from a dispute between neighbors over land that was supposed to be resolved in the courthouse. Coincidentally the wife of the alleged shooter participated on Puerto Rico ¡Gana! just days prior and had also taken time during the show to express to Alex DJ that she was having troubles with her neighbors and that she was running out of options on how to deal with the problem. After the two incidents the production of the program said in a statement that they will try and control and vet the contestants they pick to participate on the show before putting them live on the air. No further comments were provided on the incidents.

== On-air staff ==
=== Current on-air staff ===
- Alex DJ, host
- Jeananthony Medina, host
- Stephanie Font, model
- Johanna Mojica, model
- Ariette Banchs, model
- Mago MC, magician
- "Moncho" Nuñez, collaborator (also works with Hipodromo Camarero)
- Payaso Tatín, clown

=== Former on-air staff ===
- Luis "Finito" Fontanez, host (now at TeleOnce)
- Pepe Calderón, host (now at TeleOnce)
- Ivana Carolina, model
