= René Mouchotte =

French fighter pilot, killed in action while serving in the Royal Air Force

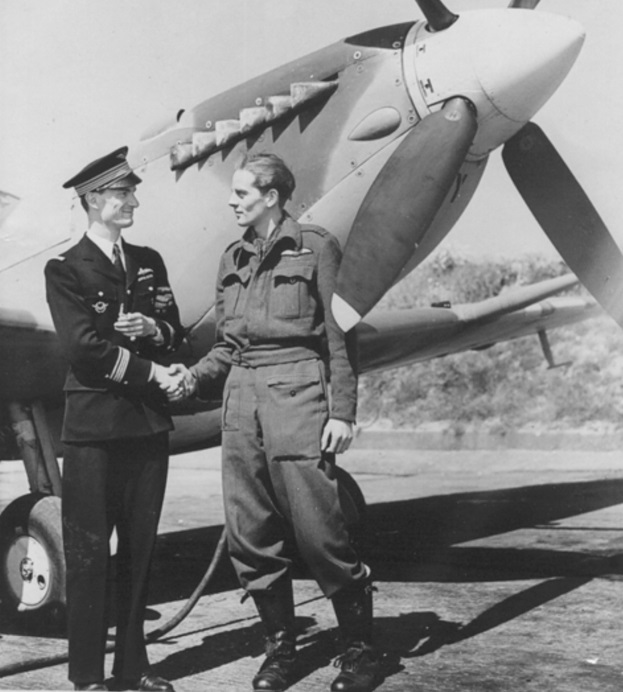
- René Mouchotte and Sqn Ldr "Jack" Charles at RAF Biggin Hill in May 1943
- Born: 21 August 1914; Paris, France
- Died: 27 August 1943 (aged 29); Pas de Calais, France
- Burial place: Père Lachaise Cemetery, Paris
- Military career
- Allegiance: France
- Branch: Royal Air Force; Free French Forces
- Service years: 1935–1939; 1939–1943
- Rank: Commandant and Squadron Leader
- Units: Escadrille « Versailles » No. 615 Squadron RAF; No. 341 Squadron RAF; No. 340 Squadron RAF
- Conflicts: World War II: Battle of Britain; Channel Front
- Awards: Chevalier de la Légion d'honneur Compagnon de la Libération; Croix de guerre 1939-1945 (6 palmes); Distinguished Flying Cross

Commandant René Mouchotte DFC (21 August 1914 – 27 August 1943) was a World War II pilot of the French Air Force, who escaped from Vichy French–controlled Oran to join the Free French forces. Serving with RAF Fighter Command, he rose to command a fighter wing before being shot down and killed on 27 August 1943. His diaries were published in 1949 and later translated into English.

== French Air Force ==
Born into a wealthy family on 21 August 1914 in Paris, Mouchotte began his military service in October 1935 with the French Air Force at Istres, where he was promoted to corporal (April 1936), master corporal (March 1937), and sergeant (April 1937); he qualified as a pilot in February 1937. In January 1939, he transferred to the reserve and resumed civilian life. Recalled in September 1939, he was posted to training establishments at Salon-de-Provence and Avord as a flying instructor. Despite several requests to join a fighter squadron, he was transferred to Oran in May 1940 for a conversion course to twin-engined aircraft. After the Armistice, the pilots on the base were ordered not to escape to join the Free French and the aircraft were placed under armed guard. Despite this, Mouchotte and five comrades (including Henry Lafont) escaped in a twin-engined Caudron Goéland aircraft, only to find that the controls for the variable-pitch propellers had been disabled, making the take-off hazardous. However they did manage to land in Gibraltar and later transferred to the Free French armed trawler, Président Houduce and sailed to England.

== In Britain ==
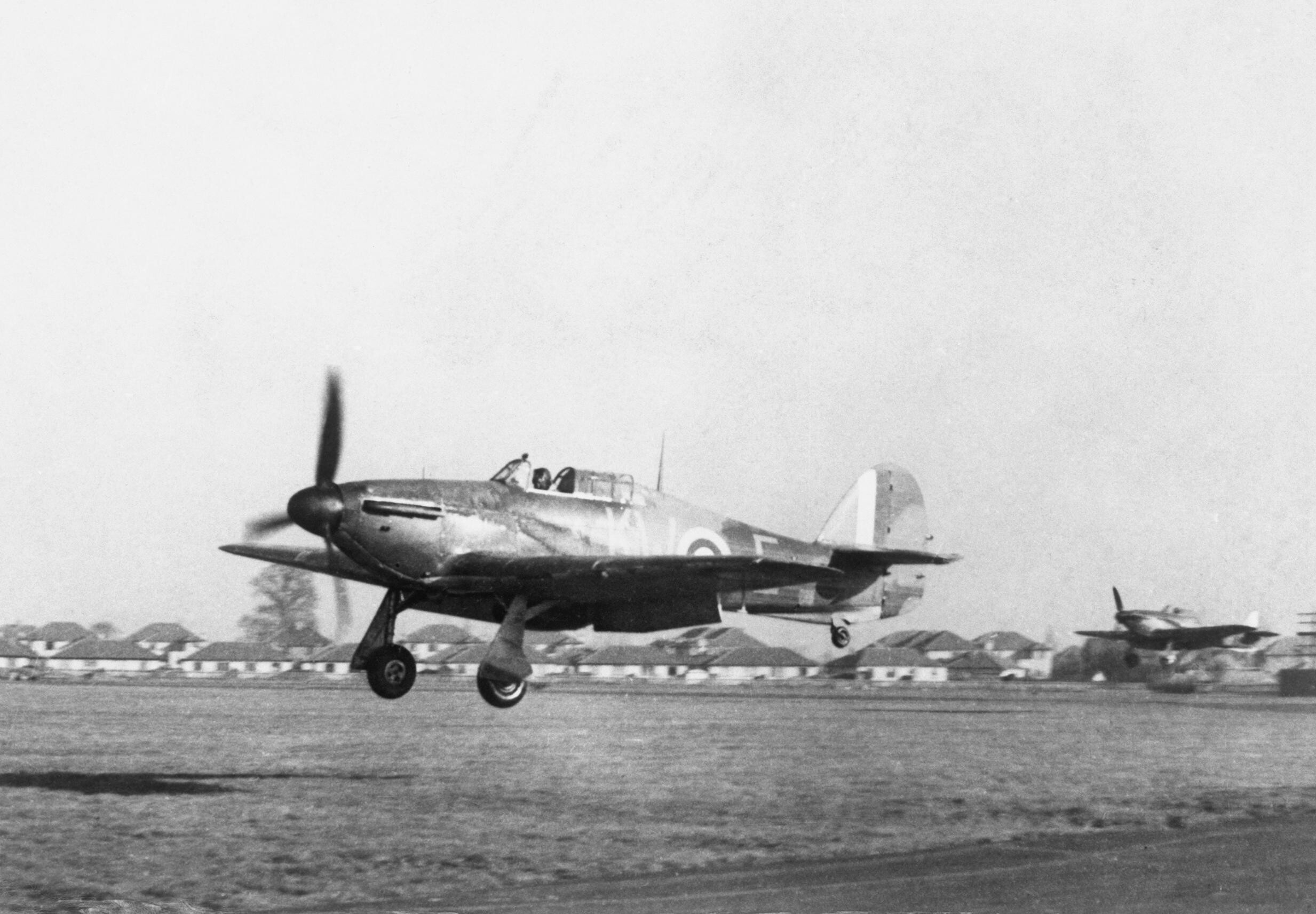
Hurricanes of 615 Squadron land at RAF Northolt in November 1940

After arriving in Britain Mouchotte trained at RAF Old Sarum and RAF Sutton Bridge on Hawker Hurricanes, before being posted to No. 615 Squadron RAF at RAF Northolt in northwest London. He carried out his first operational sortie on 11 October 1940. The squadron moved to RAF Kenley in December 1940 and in August 1941 Mouchotte participated in the shooting-down of a Junkers Ju 88. In November 1941 he transferred to RAF Turnhouse, where the Free French No. 340 Squadron RAF was training on Spitfires; he became a flight commander in February 1942. On 31 August, he was appointed squadron leader of No. 65 Squadron RAF, the first RAF squadron to be commanded by a non-Commonwealth officer. He was awarded the Distinguished Flying Cross on 1 September 1942.

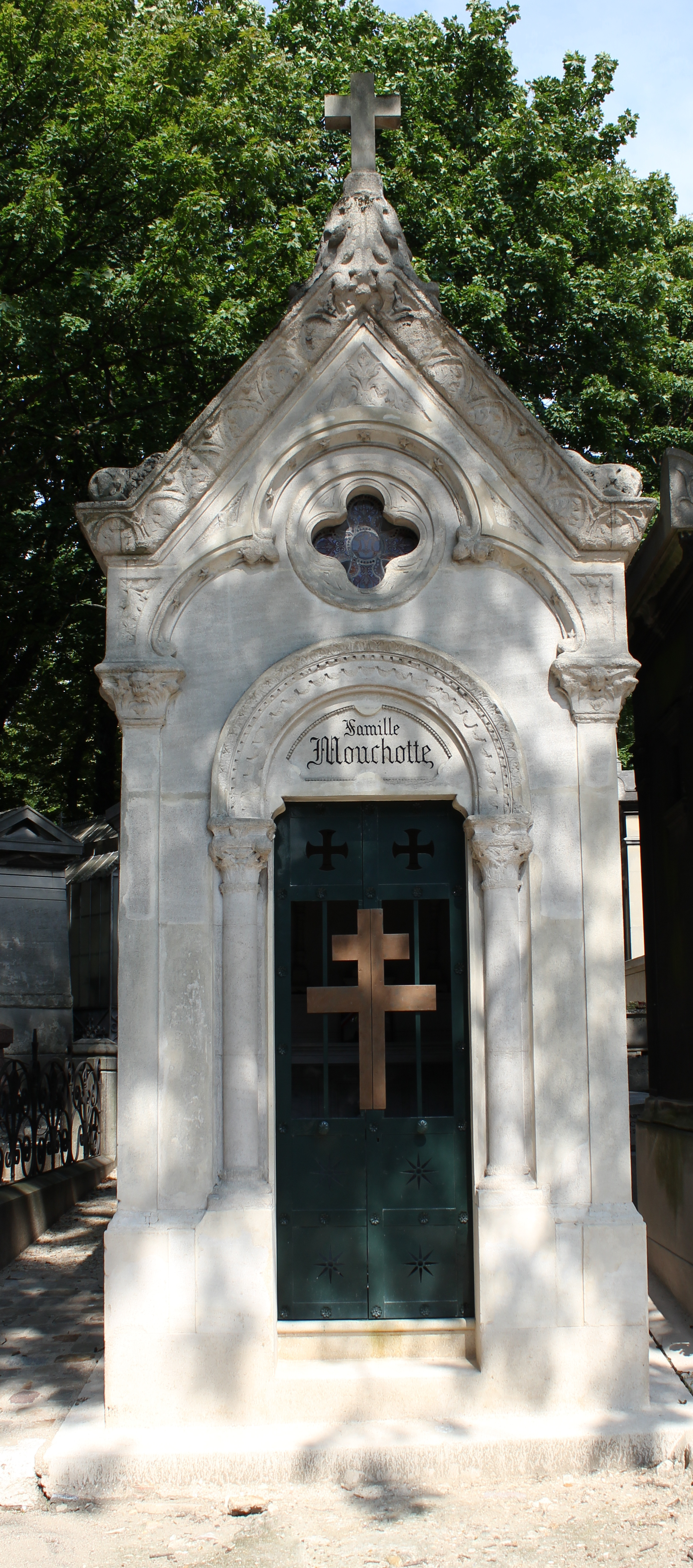
Mouchotte's tomb at Père Lachaise Cemetery in Paris

Finally, he took command of No. 341 Squadron RAF (Groupe de Chasse n° 3/2 "Alsace") with the Biggin Hill Wing. On 15 May 1943, S/L 'Jack' Charles (611 squadron) and Mouchotte both destroyed an Fw 190 of I./JG 2, as the Biggin Hill Wing's 999th and 1,000th kill claim.

He was shot down and killed in combat with Fw 190s of JG 26 during Ramrod S.8, escorting Flying Fortresses on the first daylight raid to Blockhaus d'Éperlecques in the Pas de Calais on 27 August 1943. After take off at 18.02 hours No. 341 squadron flew with bombers to a point 5 miles N.W. of Saint-Pol-sur-Mer where the whole formation turned to port on a direct course for the target. Halfway between Saint-Pol and Saint-Omer the Fortresses were attacked by several formations of Fw 190s diving out of the sun. Breaking to meet these attacks which were coming mostly from behind, the squadron became split up and a general melee followed which lasted for about 15–17 minutes. Cmdt. Mouchotte (Red 1) became separated from the squadron and was last heard to say on the R/T: "I am alone with the bombers". Nothing more was seen or heard after. His body was later washed ashore on 3 September and was buried in Middelkerke, Belgium. After the War in 1949, his body was exhumed, repatriated and buried in the family tomb at Père Lachaise Cemetery in Paris on 3 November after a memorial service with full military honours conducted at Les Invalides in Paris. In the same combat, 341 Squadron lost also Blue 4 F/Sgt Pierre Magrot who was last seen going down with Fw 190 on his tail. Both were killed by Uffz. Schöhl of 8./JG 26, Spitfire 5 km. N.W. Dunkirk at 6.000-6.500 m. 19.50 (Film C. 2031/II Anerk: Nr.12) and Hptm. Kurt Ebersberger of 4./JG 26, Spitfire St. Pol at 2.000–50 m. 19.50 (Film C. 2031/II Anerk: Nr.130). According to historian Don Caldwell, his victor may have been Leutnant Waldemar Radener, commander of 6./JG 26.

He had accumulated some 1,748 flying hours, including 408 operational hours flying 382 war sorties. He had claimed two aircraft destroyed (with a further one "shared"), one "probable" and one damaged.

== Legacy ==
After the war, his diaries and flying logs were compiled into a book by Andre Dezarrois which was published in France in 1949 as "Les carnets de René Mouchotte, 1940-1943" and later as "Mes carnets : juin 1940-août 1943". In 1956 it was translated into English by Philip John Stead and published in the United Kingdom under the title The Mouchotte Diaries; by the following year, eight editions had been printed. The book was reissued in France in 2000 and in the UK in 2003.

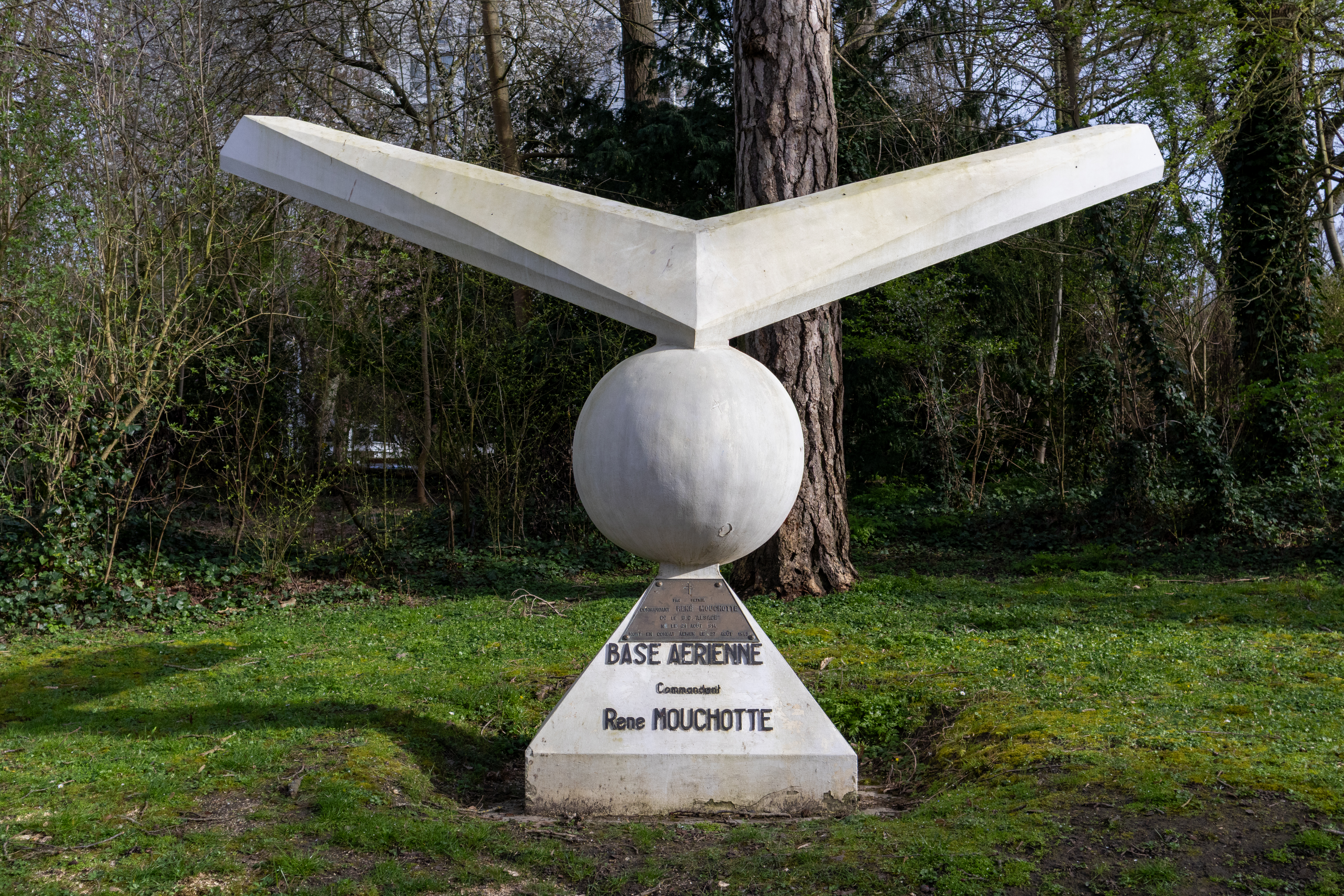
Stele of Commander René-Mouchotte in Cambrai

In Paris, a street Rue du Commandant Rene Mouchotte in the 14th Arrondissement of Paris and a nearby footbridge over the River Seine are named after him. There are two plaques in his memory at Eperlecques. A French Air Force base at Cambrai-Épinoy was named Base Aérienne 103 "Commandant René Mouchotte" in his honour. Cambrai Epinoy is no longer an active establishment, so the French Air Force Training Base at Cazaux was named after Commandant Mouchotte in September 2012. At the Lycée Français Charles de Gaulle in London on 18 June 2013 a vitrine by Ian Reed (Allied Forces Heritage Group) was unveiled in honour of Commandant René Mouchotte and the Forces Aériennes Françaises Libres. The RAF headquarters in Gibraltar was renamed the Mouchotte Building on the weekend of the Battle of Britain Commemorations on 14–15 September 2013.

Mouchotte was the subject of a BBC One television programme shown in the United Kingdom on Inside Out on 28 January 2013 and another version filmed at Elvington with Ian Reed and Jan Leeming in February 2013. Mouchotte's British campaign medals, including the Battle of Britain Clasp, were not presented to his family after the war and were obtained by Ian Reed (AFHG) and Vladimir Touplin (Musée de Ordre de Liberation) who presented them to his sister along with recently discovered footage of her brother taken in 1943, before she died in June 2012. Later they were officially presented to family members along with the medals of Mouchotte's friend Henry Lafont, in the British Ambassador's Residence in Paris on 13 July 2012.
