= Philip John Stead =

British criminologist (1915–2005)

Philip John Stead OBE, FRSL (5 February 1915 – 22 June 2005), was an English criminologist, author, literary critic, translator and poet. After retirement in the United Kingdom, he emigrated to New York and then Massachusetts.

Stead was born in Swinton, then in the West Yorkshire in 1915 and was educated at Oxford University. Moving to London, he became a member of The Critics' Circle. During World War II, he served in the British Army in North Africa, Italy, France, Belgium and Germany. In 1946, he was demobilised with the rank of captain. In 1947, he married Judith Irene Freeder and lived in Kensington. He was elected a fellow of the Royal Society of Literature in 1950 and was appointed to the National Police College at Bramshill House in 1953. In 1966 he was appointed an Officer of the Order of the British Empire. In 1971 he took sabbatical leave to teach at the John Jay College of Criminal Justice at the City University of New York.

When he retired from Bramshill in 1974, Stead returned to John Jay College as professor of police studies and was appointed dean of graduate studies. He emigrated to Manhattan with his wife and worked with the police section of the UN Convention on the Prevention of Crime. He finally retired in 1982 and moved to Hyannis, Massachusetts and then South Yarmouth where he wrote poetry and took up amateur dramatics. He died there on 22 June 2005, aged 89 years.

== Bibliography ==
- In the Street of the Angel (1947)
- Songs of the Restoration Theatre (1947)
- The Charlatan (1948)
- Fausta (1950)
- Mr Punch (1950)
- Vidocq: a Biography (1953)
- The Police of Paris (1957)
- Second Bureau. On the activities of the French Intelligence Service during the Second World War (1959)
- Police (1974)
- Pioneers in Policing (1978)
- The Structure of Education and Police Careers in Europe and America (1978)
- The Police of Britain (1985)
- Sounding Recall (2004)

=== Translations ===
- The Memoirs of Lacenaire by Pierre François Gaillard (1952)
- Les Belles Heures de ma Vie. (Cécile Sorel: An autobiography). (1953)
- The Mouchotte Diaries by René Mouchotte and André Dézarrois (1956)
- Oliver Kept a Diary by Jean Loup Dariel (1956)
- Destination Berlin by Paul Marie Ernest Vialar (1957)
