= En La Mañana =

- Genre: Morning news and talk show
- Presented by: Maricarmen Ortiz; Manuel Crespo Feliciano; Johnny Lozada; Pepe Calderón; Andrea Rivera; Carlisa Colón
- Country of origin: Puerto Rico
- Original language: Spanish

Production
- Production locations: Puerta de Tierra, San Juan; Guaynabo, Puerto Rico; Old San Juan
- Running time: 300 minutes
- Production companies: Raycom Media (1991–2002); Univision Puerto Rico (2002-2014); Liberman Media Group (2023 - Present); 313 Productions (2023 -Present)

Original release
- Network: Univision (2002–2014); TeleOnce (1991-2002; 2023-Present)
- Release: March 11, 1991 – October 17, 2014
- Release: October 30, 2023 – present

En La Mañana (In The Morning) is a Puerto Rican breakfast television show that airs on TeleOnce. The show is a revival of the original breakfast show called Tu Mañana (Your Morning) that aired on TeleOnce from 1991 to 2002 and in Univision Puerto Rico television network from 2002 to 2014. The original version of the show debuted on March 11, 1991, and was aired on weekday mornings. On October 14, 2014, the show was cancelled as part of a restructuring of Univision Puerto Rico's operations that included the closure of its news department. With the sale of WLII-DT from Univision to Liberman Media Group the new owners have announced they intend to revive Tu Mañana in 2023. The show's revival was officially announced on October 17, 2023, with a premiere date set for October 30, 2023. For the revival, the show's name was slightly tweaked from Your Morning to In The Morning

== History ==
=== Tu Mañana (1991–2014) ===
Debuting on the air on March 11, 1991 Tu Mañana was WLII's (then known as Teleonce) venture into breakfast television. The show originally aired from 6:00 a.m. to 8:00 a.m. on weekday mornings from WLII's original studios in Puerta de Tierra, Puerto Rico, and was hosted by Bruni Torres and Carlos Ochoteco. In 1999, Tu Mañana added an extra thirty minutes to their runtime with the show now airing from 5:30 a.m. to 8:00 a.m.

In 2002, Univision entered into a local marketing agreement with Raycom Media to operate WLII and WSUR-TV. After the Univision integration, Las Noticias became Las Noticias Univision and acquired the branding of all other Univision O&O stations news broadcasts, subsequently Tu Mañana was rebranded as Tu Mañana Univision and during this period Elwood Cruz and Nuria Sebazco were assigned as co-anchors, a position they held until 2011.

In 2005, Univision moved the channel's operations from Puerta de Tierra to Guaynabo, Puerto Rico. WLII began broadcasting its local newscasts in high definition on September 26, 2010. In February 2012, it expanded its time slot to four hours (from 5:00 am to 9:00 am) and added new talents Gricel Mamery and Gredmarie Colon as their hosts. This new version of Tu Mañana focused less on news and more on entertainment with veteran anchor Ramon Enrique Torres in charge of short news segments at the top of each half hour of the show. Tu Mañana served as the lead in for ¡Despierta América! which has occupied WLII's 8 a.m. time slot since 2002.

On October 17, 2014, right as Tu Mañana was going off the air, employees at WLII-DT received word from Univision that their entire news department was closing on orders from the station's new Senior-Vice President and General Manager, Jaime Bauza. Employees were informed that that day's remaining newscast would not go on the air and were instructed to gather their belongings and leave the station as their positions had been terminated effective immediately. The news was broken to the public by reporter Daisy Sanchez who informed her twitter followers of the station's decision as it was announced to them. The closure of the news department effectively cancelled Tu Mañana ending a 23-year run and leaving rival station's WAPA-TV Noticentro Al Amanecer as the sole breakfast morning show airing in Puerto Rico as WKAQ-TV also had cancelled their morning newscast a few years prior. Over 100 employees lost their job on this day and Univision Puerto Rico abstained from producing any news content until 2018 when the station started producing Edición Digital out of their WOLE-DT studios in Aguadilla, Puerto Rico. WLII's news department officially re-opened on July 12, 2022, after Univision sold the station (and its repeaters) to Liberman Media Group, who promptly decided to relaunch the station's newscasts.

=== "En La Mañana" Revival (2023–present) ===
On December 8, 2021, during the first TeleOnce upfront presentation it was announced that Tu Mañana would return in 2022, this however did not come to be and at their next upfront presentation on December 13, 2022, TeleOnce announced that Tu Mañana's return is now scheduled for "Late 2023".

On August 30, 2023, TV Boricua USA shared details of what the revival of Tu Mañana will look like. The show is rumored to begin airing in October 2023 and it is scheduled to run from 5:00 a.m. to 10:00 a.m. (This would remove Despierta América from WLII's schedule for the first time since the Univision takeover in 2002). The new version of Tu Mañana will focus on hard news from 5:00 a.m. to 7:00 a.m. and then switch to a magazine/entertainment focused program from 7:00 a.m. forward. TV Boricua also reports that TeleOnce has acquired a new studio space in Viejo San Juan from which Tu Mañana will broadcast (this would mean the show will not take place from WLII's main building in Guaynabo nor its secondary studios at The Mall of San Juan). In regards to the on-air staff, TV Boricua reports that Sonia Valentin (who previously worked in WAPA-TV) will be producing the revival of Tu Mañana. Several talents from other networks are believed to be joining the show including Maricamen Ortiz (former anchor at WAPA-TV), Nelson Del Valle and Pepe Calderón (both from WKAQ-TV).

On September 18, 2023, WLII-DT started officially promoting Tu Mañana's return with teaser trailers that promised "Soon we'll improve your mornings". The promos started airing during that day's episode of La Comay. TVBoricuaUSA has confirmed that Tu Mañana's new studio will be located on the first floor of the Paseo Caribe building in the entrance of Old San Juan and will have views of the Condado beach. While the teaser for the show did use the phrase Tu Mañana it is also rumored that the show may adopt the name Las Noticias en la Mañana (The News in the Morning) to keep the branding used in all other of the station's newscast.

On October 17, 2023, the show's revival was officially announced by Liberman Media Group on a press conference. During the event it was confirmed that Maricarmen Ortiz and Manuel Crespo Feliciano would act as the show's formal news anchors. Joining them would be Sonia Valentin, Pepe Calderón, Catherine Castro and Johnny Lozada who returns to Puerto Rico after spending time as host of Univision's ¡Despierta América! from 2012 to 2016. The show will broadcast live from WLII's newest studio located in the first floor of the Paseo Caribe building at the entrance of Old San Juan and will have window views of the Condado beach. This version of the show is a co-production between TeleOnce's news department and Sonia Valentin's 313 Productions and it premiered on October 30, 2023.

On May 15, 2024, Catherine Castro announced on her Instagram page that she had been dismissed of her duties as co-host of the show. On the post, Castro mentioned that she was not informed of the reason behind her firing. Andrea Rivera (co-host of La Bóveda de Teleonce) filled in as co-host of En La Mañana during the May 15, 2024 edition.

On May 28, 2024, it was announced on the show that Andrea Rivera would be joining the show permanently. In the announcement Rivera stated she would be leaving her role as host of La Bóveda de Teleonce to join En La Mañana and introduced Gredmarie Colón (who had served as host of the previous version of En La Mañana) as the new co-host of La Bóveda. Aside from co-hosting En La Mañana, Rivera will also continue her role as the culture and entertainment reporter for the 4pm edition of Las Noticias.

On September 20, 2024, TeleOnce announced the show's run-time would be reduced from 300 minutes to 240 minutes, moving the show's start time from 5:00 a.m. to 6:00 a.m. The reduction of time did not affect the main part of the show that starts at 7:00 a.m. but rather cut down the newscast portion that preceded it.

On the February 28th, 2025 episode, Sonia Valentin revealed that that day's broadcast would be her last. Valentin was credited with spearheading the revival of the program and served as executive producer with her production company, 313 productions, while also appearing on the show as host and political analyst. On her farewell, Valentin reiterated she would be moving on to new projects and that she was "confident the show could now stand on its own without her guidance" though it was not clarified if she would be retaining her title as a producer.

=== En La Mañana Premiere ===
En La Mañana premiered on October 30, 2023, at 4:57 a.m. with Maricarmen Ortiz and Manuel Crespo Feliciano as anchors. The first half of the show from 5:00 a.m. to 7:00 a.m. is branded on screen as Las Noticias: En La Mañana (The News: In The Morning) and utilizes the same on screen graphics as Las Noticias, news segments from 7:00 a.m. forward would also use the Las Noticias branding for its brief interventions before reverting to the En La Mañana on screen branding for the rest of the show. At 7:00 a.m. the second half of the show began with the introduction of hosts, Johnny Lozada and Sonia Valentin who arrived via Helicopter to the plaza, later Pepe Calderón arrived on Kayak through The San Juan Bay and Catherine Castro who arrived on a Can-Am vehicle to the plaza. The show had prominent political figures as guests like Puerto Rican Governor Pedro Pierluisi, mayor of San Juan Miguel Romero and interim mayor of Mayagüez Jorge Ramos. Several talent from other TeleOnce shows also paid visit during the premiere including Ferdinand Perez (Jugando Pelota Dura), Celimar Adames Casalduc (anchor of Las Noticias) and Gary Rodriguez (El Poder Del Pueblo).

The hosts also conducted interviews with Puerto Rican icons such as Félix Trinidad, Iris Chacón and various former members of boy band Menudo.

The premiere of En La Mañana was not without issues. The show suffered from severe audio problems due to non working microphones on the new studio, the issues persisted over the course of the 5-hour broadcast and was heavily pointed out by the viewers watching the television broadcast and a simulcast through the show's Facebook page.

== On-air staff ==
- Maricarmen Ortiz, anchor
- Manuel Crespo Feliciano, anchor
- Carlos Tolentino Rosario, Weather
- Orlando Cruz, reporter
- Johnny Lozada, host
- Pepe Calderón, host
- Andrea Rivera, host
- Carlisa Colón, host
- Elwood Cruz, host ¿Que Hay de Nuevo Elwood? and former anchor
- Chef Lefer, chef
- Laihany Pontón, field reporter and co-host En Familia con TeleOnce

== Former on-air staff ==
- Carlos Ochoteco, anchor (1991–1997)
- Cyd Marie Fleming, anchor (1991–1997)
- Felipe Gómez, anchor
- Bruni Torres, anchor
- Yolly Vélez, anchor
- Nuria Sebazco, anchor (2002–2011)
- Roberto Arias, sports anchor
- Zugey Lamela, anchor (2012-2014)
- Susan Soltero, Weather
- Liam Rodriguez Muñoz, reporter
- Reina Mateo, reporter
- Catherine Castro, host
- Sonia Valentin, host
- Yamaris Latorre, field reporter

== See also ==
- Breakfast television
