= Susan Soltero =

Puerto Rican weather forecaster, journalist, and TV personality

Susan Soltero (born July 7, 1961) is a weather forecaster, journalist, and TV personality from Puerto Rico, appearing weekly on Univision Puerto Rico, and daily on WALO-AM and WIAC-FM. She was born in Hato Rey, Puerto Rico. Soltero has a bachelor of arts in communications and television broadcasting from the University of Michigan, and a certificate in global warming from the University of Puerto Rico. She is also certified as a meteorologist by the National Weather Service, as well as being an official animal cruelty investigator for the Department of Health of Puerto Rico. Soltero's incessant efforts to protect the environment and animal rights in Puerto Rico—as well as her numerous environmental news reports, her cheerful and adventurous style, and her ability to communicate effectively in layman's terms—have led her to become a renowned figure for these causes on the island.

== Accolades ==
- "Best Environmental Reporter” by the Puerto Rico Environmental Quality Board (1992, 2000, 2010)
- "Best Specialty Report" by the Puerto Rico Overseas Press Club (1998)
- "Best Environmental Reporter" by the Puerto Rico Overseas Press Club (2001)
- "Woman of the Year" by the House of Representatives of Puerto Rico (2002)
- "Most Outstanding Graduate" by the University of Puerto Rico Alumni Association (2003)
- Recognized by her "reporting and commitment to the environment" by the Puerto Rico Environmental Quality Board (2005)
- Recognized by her "reporting and commitment to the environment" by the Senate of Puerto Rico (2005)
- Recognized by her "reporting and commitment to the environment" by the United States Forest Service (2005)
- Regional Emmy Award by the Suncoast Chapter/NATAS (2005)
- "Reporter of the Year" by the Puerto Rico Lions Club (2005)
- "Excellence in Environmental Reporting” by the United States Environmental Protection Agency (2006)

== Organizations ==
- Member of the Caucus on Climate Change, Senate of Puerto Rico (2007–present)
- Member of the National Association of Hispanic Journalists
- Member of the Society of Environmental Journalists
