= La Bóveda de Teleonce =

Puerto Rican game show

- Title card for the show
- Also known as: La Bóveda de Los Famosos; La Bóveda de Fin de Año
- Genre: Game show
- Created by: Josue Carrión
- Presented by: Danilo Beauchamp; Luis "Finito" Fontanez; Bebe Maldonado
- Country of origin: Puerto Rico
- Original language: Spanish
- No. of seasons: 5

Production
- Production location: Alejandro Jr. Cruz Fine Arts Center at Guaynabo, Puerto Rico
- Production company: Liberman Media Group

Original release
- Network: TeleOnce
- Release: March 1, 2022 – August 22, 2025

La Bóveda de Teleonce (Teleonce's Vault) was a Puerto Rican game show hosted by Danilo Beauchamp and co-hosted by Luis "Finito" Fontanez, Alexandra Pomales and Ashley Beth Pérez. The show aired live weekdays at 8:00 p.m. on TeleOnce.

Each episode featured contestants participating in a variety of games for the opportunity to earn a pass to the vault. The show presents an elimination round featuring the winners of all previous games and whomever wins that round earns a pass to the vault where they will have the chance to retrieve as many items as they possibly can before the door of the vault closes.

The show was originally known as La Bóveda de Mr. Cash (Mr. Cash's Vault) named after the previous host of the show Josue Carrión a.k.a. Mr. Cash. After Carrion was replaced as host of the show, the show took on the name of the network and became La Bóveda de Teleonce.

== History ==
=== La Bóveda de Mr. Cash ===
After Liberman Media Group acquired TeleOnce in 2021, one of the first original projects announced was a game show hosted by Mr. Cash. Cash (real name, Josue Carrion) had hosted game shows for WAPA and Mega TV previously and was bringing the formula to TeleOnce. During the network's first ever upfront presentation in December 202, it was announced that the show would be premiering on January 31, 2022, and would broadcast from the network's new studios at The Mall of San Juan. The premiere of the show was actually pushed back 3-months due to the studios not being ready. La Boveda de Mr. Cash finally premiered on March 31, 2022, at 3:00 p.m. and served as a lead-in for Las Noticias. The premise of the show would see contestants participate in games that could earn them a pass to "The Vault", once in The Vault, the contestants would have 30 seconds to retrieve as many of the big ticket items inside of it before the time ran out and the door closed. Prizes in The Vault included electronics such as 4K televisions, sound systems, computers and gaming consoles and even briefcases with cash prizes that ranged from $100 to $400.

On April 4, 2022, Andrea Rivera joined the show as a co-host. Rivera had previously worked on WAPA as a host of Viva La Tarde and she served as a model for El Tiempo es Oro which was the game show Mr. Cash had on WAPA. Aside from co-hosting La Bóveda, Rivera also became an entertainment correspondent for Las Noticias.

On April 18, 2022, Luis Tomas "Finito" Fontanez joined the show. "Finito" had previously worked for the game show Puerto Rico Gana that airs on Telemundo Puerto Rico. His arrival came with the arrival of a new executive producer for the show. Josema Hernandez was named executive producer of the show to "push TeleOnce's new vision for the program",and his arrival would signify major changes for the show in the future.

On August 5, 2022, TeleOnce announced that La Boveda would now be airing live on primetime moving from the 3:00 p.m. time slot to 8:00 p.m. immediately following Jugando Pelota Dura. The announcement also made it known that Josue "Mr. Cash" Carrion, whose name was on the show's title, would no longer be a part of the show and henceforth the show would be known as La Bóveda de TeleOnce (TeleOnce's Vault). Carrion's last show as host aired on August 12, 2022. Carrion notified his followers on the social media Instagram that "TeleOnce had fired him from the show" and that he was "blindsided by the decision".

=== La Bóveda de TeleOnce ===
On August 22, 2022, the show officially moved to 8:00 p.m. and became La Bóveda de TeleOnce. Andres Waldemar was introduced as a co-host alongside Andrea Rivera. Awilda Herrera, who was fresh off appearing on the dating show Enamorándonos (which airs at on TeleOnce right after La Boveda at 9:00 p.m.) also joined the show as a co-host during this period.

The format of the show changed significantly with the time slot change. On this new version of the show contestants that would win games across the first half of the show would now be part of an elimination round in the second half of the show where they all faced off with only one of them getting the opportunity to go inside the vault. The new version of the show also saw the introduction of TeleBingo a bingo game the audience could play from their house.

On June 27, 2023, Andres Waldemar announced on his Instagram page that he would be exiting the show. Waldemar's exit followed Awilda Herrera's exit whom had quit the show back in October of the previous year. The announcement of Waldemar's exit came after TeleOnce announced that Danilo Beauchamp, who previously had worked at WAPA as a sketch comedian and game show host, would be joining the program. After Waldemar announced his exit, TeleOnce officially announced Beauchamp as the new host of La Boveda alongside Rivera and "Finito".

On March 26, 2024, it was announced that the show would be leaving its studio at The Mall of San Juan for a new studio to be built at the Guaynabo Performing Arts Center. The new studio is in close proximity to TeleOnce's main studio building in Guaynabo and will allow for a bigger audience to attend the show. As production executes the move and builds the new set, TeleOnce has opted to air reruns of the show. The new season of La Bóveda premiered on April 8, 2024.

On May 28, 2024, the show announced that host Andrea Rivera would be leaving the program to join the network's morning show En La Mañana permanently, Rivera was the last remaining cast member from the original version of the show. Following her exit it was announced that Gredmarie Colón would be joining the show as its new co-host beginning on that very same May 28 episode.

On August 20, 2025 it was announced that show would be airing its final episode later that week. Although at first it was billed as a season finale, it was later confirmed that the show had been effectively canceled as part of a cost cutting measure at TeleOnce. La Bóveda aired its final episode on August 22, 2025.

== Games ==
The show features a variety of games played with that are played with the studio audience such as,

- Kareo-Kiando - Contestants try and finish the lyrics of a song by singing. If they do not know the song a spike above them will rise up slightly, if the spike rises enough times it pops a balloon full of water unto the contestant and they lose the game.
- Memory de la Boveda - A live version of the Concentration (card game) where contestants choose cards from the big screen on stage. The one with the most correct matches wins.
- El Gallinero - A game where a contestant will dress up in a giant chicken suit and be pitted against another person in a chicken suit. The goal is to push your opponent outside of the designated "fighting" space, akin to Sumo Wrestling.
- La Frase que gana - A game of audience participation where one of the hosts will give out three phrases across the course of the show and then the audience has to call to repeat the phrases in the correct order. First call to do so wins.
- ¿Que dijo el Boricua? - A Family Feud style game where the questions are answered by viewers using real-time fan votes. The contestant in the studio has to guess what the audience voted for and for each correct answer the contestant earns $25.
- Pastel-igencia - Contestants have to answer trivia questions, if the contestant answers the question wrongly they will have a pie thrown at their face. The contestant with the most right answer wins.
- Que no se trepe el mono - A talent show type of game where contestants will perform a song and a cast member in a monkey suit decides if they did a good job or not. If the "monkey" decides you did a bad job you are eliminated. Winner is determined by audience applause vote.

=== Desletrados ===
Desletrados is the final game on each show and it gathers four winners of previous games in the evening for one final competition. On the big screen the contestant are shown scrambled phrases or words and they must buzz in with the unscrambled answer. The contestant with the most correct answers gets to go into The Vault.

== TeleBingo ==
After the move to primetime the show debuted their new TeleBingo game which is intended for the audience at home to participate. The game uses bingo cards distributed through the local newspaper El Vocero and at local KFC restaurants, Econo Supermarkets and EcoMaxx gas stations. Viewers can play bingo during the live show, with the first person to call in with a winning card awarded up to $1,000 cash. The game runs Monday through Thursdays and if no one gets bingo by the end of the week the prize money doubles the following week.

== La Bóveda de Fin de Año ==
Since 2022, La Boveda has hosted TeleOnce's New Year's Eve Festivities. The hosts of La Boveda are in charge of hosting duties for the special and the audience is made up of on-air talent and teamsters of TeleOnce. During the New Year's Eve specials talent from other shows participate on the games and introduce musical performances. The 2023 edition featured performances by Michael Stuart, Domingo Quiñones, Victoria Sanabria, Carlos Nevarez and a tribute to Roberto Roena and Apollo Sound. The specials run for two hours, and the cast of La Bóveda leads the countdown to ring in the new year.
