= Juego de voces =

- Juego de Voces
- Genre: Musical reality show
- Created by: Marcelo Stripini
- Starring: Angélica Vale
- Country of origin: Mexico
- Original language: Spanish
- No. of seasons: 2

Original release
- Network: Univision; Las Estrellas
- Release: April 2024 – present

Juego de Voces is a Mexican television musical reality show created by Marcelo Strupini and Angélica Vale. The show broadcasts on Univision and Las Estrellas. The first season premiered in April 2024, and the second premiered on March 16, 2025. The show airs on both networks every Sunday night on 7 p.m. PST and 6 p.m. CST regularly on all channels.

== Format ==
Established artists in two teams, Las Estrellas (the Stars) and Las Leyendas (the Legends), face off against each other in different challenges. Each episode features challenges like "Two vs. Two," "The Same Song," and "Song to Heaven." The studio audience votes for their favorite team, and the selected contestant chooses a vinyl record containing points that are added to their team's score. The team with the most points at the end of the season is the winner.

All episodes from both seasons of Juego de Voces are available for streaming on Prime Video and ViX.
