= Tomiko =

- Gender: Female

Origin
- Origin: Japanese
- Meaning: Different meanings depending on the kanji used

Tomiko (written: 富子, 都美子, とみ子, とみこ, トミ子 or トミコ) is a feminine Japanese given name. Notable people with the name include:

- Tomiko Claire (トミコ クレア; born 2000), American actress and model
- Hino Tomiko (日野 富子; 1440–1496), wife of Ashikaga Yoshimasa and mother of Ashikaga Yoshihisa
- Tomiko Ishii (石井 トミコ; born 1935), Japanese actress
- Tomiko Itooka (糸岡 富子; 1908–2024), Japanese supercentenarian and for four months world's oldest living person
- Tomiko Lee, South Korean actress and film producer
- Tomiko Okazaki (岡崎 トミ子; 1944–2017), Japanese politician
- Tomiko Satō (佐藤 富子; 1894–1995), Japanese centenarian
- Tomiko Suzuki (鈴木 富子; 1956–2003), Japanese voice actress
- Tomiko Van (伴 都美子; born 1979), Japanese singer and actress
- Tomiko Yoshikawa (吉川とみ子; born 1954), Japanese racing driver

== Fictional characters ==
- Tomiko, a doll in the Groovy Girls line of fashion dolls
- Tomiko Riser, a marine staff Sergeant in the Sentenced to War series of books.
