= Henry Lafont =

French Air Force officer

- Henry Lafont
- Born: 10 August 1920; Cahors, France
- Died: 2 December 2011 (aged 91)
- Military career
- Allegiance: French
- Branch: Air Force
- Service years: 1938–1966
- Rank: Colonel
- Unit: Forces Aériennes Françaises Libres
- Conflicts: Battle of Britain
- Awards: Croix de Guerre with three palms, Cross for Military Valour, Companion of the Ordre de la Libération
- Other work: Director of the Paris Air Show

Henry Lafont (10 August 1920 in Cahors – 2 December 2011) was a French aviator. He was the last surviving French veteran of the Battle of Britain.

== Early life ==
Lafont was born in Cahors, France on 10 August 1920. Attracted by flying, he obtained his pilot's license and, in November 1938, entered the Armée de l'Air flying school at Istres. When the Armistice was signed on 22 June 1940, Lafont was just finishing a course at the Fighter School at La Sénia airfield near Oran, Algeria.

== Air Force career ==
Lafont refused to accept the Armistice with Germany. With five other servicemen, including René Mouchotte and Charles Guérin, he escaped from Oran to join the Forces Aériennes Françaises Libres. They escaped by flying a twin-engine Caudron Goéland transport aircraft, surviving a takeoff with sabotaged propellers locked in coarse pitch, to Gibraltar, navigating with the aid of a school atlas. The group joined the Forces Aériennes Françaises Libres in June 1940. They arrived in Britain in mid-July.

Lafont was one of eleven French pilots posted to RAF St. Athan in late July. He moved to No. 1 School of Army Co-operation at Old Sarum on 29 July and then went to Odiham on 10 August where he flew 15 hours on Tiger Moths and Hectors. He was posted to 6 OTU, Sutton Bridge on the 19 August, converting to Hurricanes and joined No. 245 Squadron at Aldergrove on 11 September.

On 18 September, Lafont was attached to No. 615 Squadron RAF at Prestwick and moved south with 615 to Northolt on 9 October, participating in the latter stages of the Battle of Britain flying Hurricanes. He claimed Bf.109s "probably destroyed" on 26 February 1941 and on 15 March. He was himself most probably shot down on 29 October flying Hurricane Mk.I V7383. Taking off at 12.00 hours, he crashed in attempting a forced landing between trees near Teston at 12.40 with a damaged engine and a glycol leak. An eyewitness of his shooting down was René Mouchotte: "Attacked by Messerschmitts, higher up than we were; we did not see them, the sun is so dazzling. They dropped out of the sky like three stones and climbed back without giving us time to say ʽOuf!ʼ In the scrap that followed I saw two of ours shot down. One of them was my only French comrade in the squadron. Luckily he was not hit and landed in a field. The enemy has a terrible advantage in superiority of altitude."

In May 1941, he was posted to 59 OTU as an instructor for French pilots coming from 10 FTS at Ternhill. There Lafont trained more than 60 French pilots. He later joined the Groupe de Chasse n°1 "Alsace" (later incorporated into No. 341 Squadron RAF), which was formed in the Middle East and took part convoy patrols during the campaign in Libya.

Wounded on 27 June 1942, he returned to action in January 1943, flying fighter operations over the Western Front. He finished the war flying a Spitfire Mk. IX, and had completed 230 operational missions. He left the air force in 1966 with the rank of colonel.

== Later career ==
From 1967 to 1984, Lafont was director of the Paris Air Show at Le Bourget.

== Awards ==
Lafont was awarded the Croix de Guerre with three palms and the Cross for Military Valour. He also was made a Companion of the Ordre de la Libération.

== Bibliography ==
- Henry Lafont, Aviateurs de la liberté, mémorial des Forces Aériennes Françaises Libres, Service historique de l'Armée de l'Air, 2002
