= Jay Fonseca =

Puerto Rican journalist

- Born: March 1, 1982 (age 44); Chicago, Illinois
- Education: University of Puerto Rico (B.S.B.A in Finance & Accounting, 2006); University of Puerto Rico School of Law (J.D., 2011)
- Occupations: Journalist; Political analyst Radio host
- Website: jayfonseca.com

Josué Fonseca Aponte (better known as Jay Fonseca) is a Puerto Rican journalist, radio host, lawyer, and political analyst. Fonseca appeared in Día a Día and Telenoticias on Telemundo Puerto Rico for eleven years until he announced his departure from the channel on 16 July 2021. Fonseca holds a bachelor's degree in Finance and Accounting from the University of Puerto Rico at Mayagüez (2006) and a juris doctor (cum laude) from the University of Puerto Rico School of Law (2011). From 2018 till his departure from Telemundo in 2021, he was the host of his own investigative reporting program, "Jay y sus rayos x," which will continue to be broadcast under "los Datos son los Datos".

== Family ==
Fonseca is the son of Víctor Fonseca and Teresa Aponte.
