= Atención Atención =

Puerto Rican children's television series

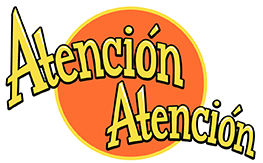

Background information
- Origin: San Juan, Puerto Rico
- Genre: Children's
- Years active: 1999–present
- Members: See Members below
- Website: http://www.atencionatencion.com

Atención Atención (English: Listen Up Listen Up) is a Puerto Rican live-action/puppet children's television show and band formed in San Juan, Puerto Rico, in 1999 starring three costumed characters and their friends, the Atención Atención band. Atención Atención explores a specific theme in each episode, e.g. "Colors", "Friends" and "Means of transportation" through songs and short storylines in the half-hour program. Additionally, the show teaches children life and social skills, such as sharing and travels around the world with Vera, the traveling flea. It also encourages viewers to move along with and dance with the characters in the program. It all started in 1999 giving music workshops to kindergarten teachers in Puerto Rico and Dominican Republic and with Víctor Rivera's vision of a live action TV show that was a cross between Sesame Street and MTV, the band filmed their first DVD in 2007.

== Members ==
Atención Atención band

- Víctor M. Rivera – Voice and musical director (1999–present)
- Stephanie Mercado "Clara" – Voice and transverse flute (2009–present)
- Nelson Camacho – Bass (2005–present)
- Denes Pagan – Guitar (2021–present)
- Luis Seguinot – Drums (2013–present)
- Janice Maisonet – Sax (2014–present)
- Meliana González – Piano (2019–present)

Characters

- Sr. Sapo
- Johnny el Lagartijo
- Tito Angelito
- Vera la pulga viajera
- Cillo el duende
- La Brujita Tapita
- Makako Mono

== Recognitions ==
Atención Atención had 56 nominations to the Emmy Award Suncoast Chapter and is winner of twenty-seven statuettes in different categories:

- Best Audio in 2011
- Best Educational Program in 2012
- Best Children Program, Best Post Production Director and Best Audio in 2013
- Best Animation, Best Music and On-Camera Talent in 2014
- Best Audio and Best Live Director in 2015
- Best Educational Program, Best Animation, Best Post Production Director, Best Script, Best Graphics, Best Art director and Best Technical Achievement in 2016
- Best Animation, Best Post Production Director, Best Graphics and Best Technical Achievement in 2017
- Best Children Program, Best Animation, Best Editor and Best writer in 2018
- Best Commercial (Single Spot) and Best Graphics Arts in 2022

On November 21, 2013, the band was nominated for a Latin Grammy award for Best Children's Album with Vamos a bailar.

On January 25, 2012, the show was recognized as a "Program for Lifelong Learning" by the United Nations in their Music as a Global Resource Compendium – Third Edition in 2012, and in 2015 and 2020 in their Fourth and in Fifth Edition.

== Discography ==
=== CDs ===
- 1999: Atención Atención este juego va a empezar
- 2001: Atención Atención este juego va a seguir
- 2004: Atención Atención llega la navidad
- 2006: Atención Atención en vivo
- 2008: Atención Atención el especial
- 2009: Atención Atención vamos a dormir
- 2010: De viaje con el Sr. Sapo y Vera - Live
- 2011: ¿Que pasa con la música?
- 2012: Vamos a bailar
- 2014: Atención Atención Live (Anniversary tour)
- 2015: Atención Atención Symphonic
- 2016: ¿Donde está el Sr. Sapo? CD/DVD
- 2023: A la 1, a las 2 y a las 3
- 2024: Atención Atención 25 Años
- 2025: Dance Party

==== Singles ====
- 2018: Bam Bim Bum
- 2019: La Le Li Lo Lu
- 2020: El Ukulele
- 2021: Vuelvo a la escuela
- 2021: La mascarilla
- 2021: Feliz, Feliz Navidad
- 2022: Yupi Yei

=== DVDs ===
- 2006: Atención Atención en vivo
- 2007: Atención Atención el especial
- 2009: Atención Atención el especial 2
- 2010: Atención Atención de viaje con el Sr. Sapo y Vera – Live
- 2011: ¿Que pasa con la música? The concert
- 2012: Atención Atención "First Season"
- 2013: Atención Atención "Second season"
- 2014: Atención Atención 15 años "The anniversary concert"
- 2015: Atención Atención ¡Vamos a cantar! Sing Along Vol.1
- 2015: Atención Atención "Third season"
- 2016: ¿Donde está el Sr. Sapo? CD/DVD
- 2017: Atención Atención "Fourth season"
- 2018: ¿Donde está el Sr. Sapo? 360˚ Live - Online exclusive
- 2019: Atención Atención es navidad – Online exclusive

== Seasons overview ==
Season	Episodes	Originally aired (PR)	
Season	Episodes	First aired	Network
1	13	December 10, 2009	UNIVISION
2	13	February 20, 2011	UNIVISION
3	13	March 13, 2013	UNIVISION
4	13	March 19, 2015	UNIVISION
5	13	April 21, 2018	UNIVISION
6	69	October 2, 2022	TELEMUNDO
7	13	January 4, 2026	TELEMUNDO
Season	Episodes	Originally aired (US)	
Season	Episodes	First aired	Network
6	26	October 6, 2018	UNIVISION NETWORK
7	13	October 26, 2024	UNIVISION NETWORK

=== Countries aired ===
- United States in Univision and Telemundo
- Dominican Republic in Antena Latina 7
- Panama in Telemetro
