= Las Noticias =

Flagship daily evening television news program for TeleOnce

- Logo for Las Noticias
- Also known as: Las Noticias En La Mañana (Morning Broadcast); Las Noticias Al Mediodía (11am Broadcast); Las Noticias: Ahora (4pm broadcast); Las Noticias: Prime (5pm broadcast); Las Noticias: Última Edición (Night time broadcast)
- Genre: News program
- Created by: Enrique Cruz; Jenny Suarez
- Presented by: En La Mañana: Maricarmen Ortiz and Manuel Crespo Feliciano; Midday: Maricarmen Ortiz; Ahora: Celimar Adames; Prime: Celimar Adames; Última Edición: Celimar Adames
- Opening theme: "A New Wish" by Warner Chappell Production Music
- Ending theme: Same as opening
- Country of origin: Puerto Rico
- Original language: Spanish

Production
- Executive producer: Stephanie Castro Nazario
- Production locations: Paseo Caribe San Juan, Puerto Rico; Tommy Muñiz Studio at TeleOnce, Guaynabo, Puerto Rico
- Camera setup: Multi-camera
- Running time: En La Mañana: 300 minutes Midday: 30 minutes Ahora: 60 minutes Prime: 60 minutes Última Edición: 60 minutes
- Production company: Liberman Media Group

Original release
- Network: TeleOnce
- Release: May 27, 1986 – October 17, 2014
- Release: July 12, 2021 – present

Related
- En La Mañana; Telenoticias; NotiCentro

Las Noticias TeleOnce is the flagship news program for Puerto Rican television network TeleOnce. It is currently anchored by Celimar Adames Casalduc during its evening and night editions, Maricarmen Ortiz and Manuel Crespo Feliciano during the day editions.

The news program originated in 1986 and ran four editions weekdays and two on weekends until its abrupt cancellation in 2014 by Univision who decided to close the station's news department. In 2020, Univision sold TeleOnce to Liberman Media Group and the new ownership quickly reopened the station's news department and revived Las Noticias.

== History ==
=== Las Noticias TeleOnce (1986–2002) ===
News programming on WLII began in May 1986, with Ramón Enrique Torres and Jennifer Wolff as anchors of the 5:00 p.m. newscast. In 1990, a noon newscast premiered with Torres and Margarita Aponte as its anchors, followed by the 10:30 p.m. newscast with Torres. On March 11, 1991, a weekday morning news program, Tu Mañana, made its debut; the program was anchored by Carlos Ochoteco and Cyd Marie Fleming and featured segments such as panels of experts on different topics.

Over the years, many people worked on Tu Mañana and Las Noticias. Reporters such as Carmen Dominicci, Elwood Cruz, Susan Soltero, Bruni Torres, Nuria Sebazco, Rommy Segarra, Felipe Gómez (now at WAPA-TV), Ada Monzón (now at WAPA-TV), and Liza Lugo have been featured.

In 1996, a monthly investigative/tabloid newsmagazine called Las Noticias Xtra began airing, which offered reports considered to be shocking by audiences. Taboo themes in Puerto Rican society such as homosexuality were featured. Las Noticias Xtra eventually was reduced to a weekly segment seen during the 6:00 and 11:00 p.m. newscasts. During WLII's TeleOnce years, the station's slogan was "TeleOnce: 24 horas el canal de Las Noticias" (lit. 'TeleOnce, the 24-hour news channel'), paralleling the 24-hour news source trend in the United States at the time.

=== Las Noticias Univision (2002–2014) ===
After the Univision integration in 2002, Las Noticias became Las Noticias Univision and acquired the branding of all other Univision O&O stations news broadcasts. WLII began broadcasting its local newscasts in high definition on September 26, 2010. Due to budget cuts that were imposed by Univision in Miami, WLII reduced its news department by between 20 and 50 employees, and Las Noticias a las 6 was reduced from 60 to 30 minutes. The station discontinued its weekend newscasts on January 5, 2014; following this, it reduced its news operation from 35 1/2 to 32 1/2 hours each week, which led to the firing of 19 employees.

On October 17, 2014, Univision announced that Jaime Bauzá had been promoted to senior vice-president and general manager of all of the network's operations in Puerto Rico. The first change he made was the firing of 109 employees. This caused the closing of the entire news department, including reporters, anchors, and cameramen. On that day, the morning show Tu Mañana was shown as normal, but the midday show Tu Mediodia was not, during which time reporter Daisy Sánchez published on her Twitter account the announcement of the news department's closing.

The roundtable talk show Rubén & Co. replaced the 5:00 p.m. spot left by Las Noticias. The show was extended from 30 to 60 minutes, and filled the 5:00 p.m. timeslot until its cancellation on January 20, 2016.

=== Las Noticias TeleOnce revival (since 2021) ===
On February 18, 2021, TeleOnce hired José Enrique "Kike" Cruz, who was news director at WAPA-TV for 32 years (from 1976 until his retirement in 2018), as an adviser for the revamped news department after more than six years without newscasts. On April 14, 2021, TeleOnce hired Jenny Suarez, a former news producer at WAPA-TV, as its vice-president of the revamped news department.

On June 7, 2021, WLII-DT confirmed their intentions to relaunch their newscasts with the new telecast set to premiere in late July/early August 2021 in the 5 p.m. timeslot. Celimar Adames Casalduc (who anchored WAPA-TV's NotiCentro for 18 years) would join TeleOnce as the lead anchor for the newscast, and Deborah Martorell (who served as WAPA-TV's Chief Meteorologist for 27 years) would also be joining as TeleOnce's Chief Meteorologist. It was also announced that Tatiana Ortiz and Nuria Sebazco (who previously hosted TeleOnce's morning newscast Tu Mañana) would return to the network, both migrating from WKAQ-TV. On June 8, 2021, WLII-DT announced that Ricardo Currás (formerly of WKAQ-TV and who anchored morning newscasts from Univision O&O WXTV-DT) would join Adames as co-anchor.

On June 23, 2021, WLII-DT announced that their relaunched newscast would be called Las Noticias TeleOnce, thus reviving the original brand which ran for almost 30 years. Las Noticias TeleOnce premiered on July 12, 2021, with three editions: Las Noticias: Ahora ('The News: Now') at 3:55 p.m., Las Noticias: Prime ('The News: Prime') at 4:55 p.m., and Las Noticias: Última Edición ('The News: Final Edition') at 10:00 p.m. All three editions were anchored by Adames and Currás, and featured Martorell on weather and Luis Joel Aymat (who anchored the former Edicion Puerto Rico newscast) in sports.

Title card for the 4pm newscast "Las Noticias Ahora"

On October 4, 2021, Las Noticias added a political analysis team composed of former Puerto Rican Governor Anibal Acevedo Vila, former gubernatorial candidate Alexandra Lúgaro, journalist and Jugando Pelota Dura contributor Leo Aldridge, and lawyer Ramón Rosario Cortés. The segment entitled "El Comentario de la Tarde" features one of the aforementioned commentators breaking down a news item alongside anchors Currás and Adames.

On October 11, 2021, the nightly newscast Las Noticias: Última Edición moved from 10 p.m. to 11 p.m. due to premiere of WLII's new late-night talk show, Acuéstate con Francis.

On November 18, 2021, WLII-DT announced that Las Noticias would add another daily newscast, this one during the midday time slot. The newscast, titled Las Noticias Al Mediodía ('The News at Noon'), debuted December 6, 2021, at 12 p.m. and features Celimar Adames, Nuria Sebazco and Deborah Martorell, which, according to WLII, is the first all-female local news team in Puerto Rico. This edition follows a different format from the other newscasts, and features segments on lifestyle, travel, and finances.

On December 3, 2021, Celimar Adames announced that she will no longer anchor the 11 p.m. broadcast of Última Edición, and would instead focus on anchoring the midday and afternoon broadcasts; field reporter Shirlyan Odette would replace her for the 11 p.m. broadcast.

On December 9, 2021, during the station's upfront presentation, VP of News Jenny Suarez and consultant José Enrique "Kike" Cruz announced the revival of the morning news show Tu Mañana. The show was slated to return in early 2022—over 8 years after its abrupt cancellation in October 2014. However, the following year, it was delayed until late 2023.

On December 14, 2021, WLII-DT launched a new investigative unit for the news department headed by journalist and lawyer Mardelis Jusino, who worked at the investigative division of Jugando Pelota Dura, as well as for WAPA-TV and WMTJ. The investigative unit team consists of Melissa Correa, who worked for 18 years at El Vocero; Tatiana Ortiz and Arnaldo Rojas, who worked as an anchor and reporter for WAPA-TV from 2002 to 2008.

On January 11, 2022, WLII-DT announced that former representative Gary Rodriguez, who worked for WAPA-TV's Lo Sé Todo would be joining Las Noticias as a political commentator. His on-air debut was on January 15, 2022. The new section titled El Fuetazo de Gary officially began on January 24, 2021, and airs during the midday and evening newscasts.

On January 23, 2022, WLII-DT announced that Liam Rodríguez Muñoz, who worked for ABC News Extra, would join the news department as a video journalist and reporter. Rodríguez Muñoz previously worked for the station, as a panelist for Los Seis de la Tarde and as a reporter and content producer for Jugando Pelota Dura.

On March 22, 2022, Andrea Rivera, who worked for WAPA-TV as a host for Viva la Tarde, joined WLII-DT's news department as an entertainment reporter, and premiered its segment called Primera Fila on April 4, 2022. She also co-hosts La Boveda de Teleonce, which serves as a lead-in for Las Noticias.

On July 3, 2023, the station announced Cristina Pagán as its new sports reporter. Pagán comes from WKAQ-TV where she worked as segment producer, she replaces Luis Joel Aymat who was dismissed from the position earlier in the year.

On October 12, 2023, WLII announced the hiring of Carlos Tolentino Rosario to Las Noticias. Rosario previously worked as a reporter for newspaper "El Nuevo Día" and will be taking over the weather report segment on the night broadcast after Manuel Crespo Feliciano was promoted to anchor of the station's upcoming morning show "En La Mañana".

On November 1, 2024, Ricardo Currás has exited WLII after three years as an anchor and reporter.

On August 29, 2025, As part of the restructuring of operations, WLII announce the firing of 10 employees and the reduction of workforce from 8 to 6 hours, this includes reporters Reina Mateo (who spent seven months at the station after being fired from WAPA) and Arnaldo Rojas (who has been with TeleOnce since December 2021), as well as cameramen, editors, producers and a manager. One month later, on September 29, Rojas returned to the station after he was fired.

On December 31, 2025, WLII-DT lost their licensing agreement with TelevisaUnivision forcing the station to fill up their schedule with original programming due to the loss of content from Univision on peak prime time and day time hours. Liberman Media Group dealt with this situation by extending or adding more editions of Las Noticias. In January 2026, the network expanded the runtime of En La Mañana by adding an extra hour, added a new broadcast of Las Noticias at 2:00 p.m., moved up the nighttime newscast to 9:00 p.m. and added an extra hour to said newscast. However, on March 30, the 9:00 p.m. newscast was reduced back to 1-hour in favor of airing movies in the 10:00 p.m. slot.

== En La Mañana ==
WLII debuted on the morning show format with "Tu Mañana" in 1991. The show quickly became a leader in morning news with anchors Bruni Torres and Felipe Gomez Martinez and ran until 2014 when the decision to close of the station's news department effectively cancelled the program. In October 2023, the show will finally be revived almost a decade after its cancellation. The new version of the show will be named "En La Mañana" (In the Morning) rather than "Tu Mañana" (Your Morning) and will be anchored by Manuel Crespo Feliciano and Maricarmen Ortiz. The premiere is set for October 30, 2023.

== On-air staff ==
- Celimar Adames Casalduc, anchor
- Deborah Martorell, Chief Meteorologist
- Manuel Crespo Feliciano, anchor En La Mañana
- Maricarmen Ortiz, anchor En La Mañana and Al Mediodía
- Cristina Pagán, sports
- Elwood Cruz, host ¿Que Hay de Nuevo Elwood? and former anchor
- Aníbal Acevedo Vilá, political analyst
- Carlos Tolentino Rosado, Meteorologist
- Nuria Sebazco, anchor and field reporter
- Melissa Correa, investigative reporter
- Orlando Cruz, field reporter
- Héctor Roldán, field reporter
- Wilmarie Mena Santiago, western bureau reporter

== Former on-air staff ==
- Cyd Marie Fleming, anchor (later at Jugando Pelota Dura)
- Margarita Aponte, anchor and field reporter (now at Jugando Pelota Dura)
- Ramon Enrique Torres, anchor (deceased)
- Jennifer Wolff, anchor (deceased)
- Ivonne Solla Cabrera, sports reporter (now at WKAQ-TV)
- Yolanda Vélez Arcelay, field reporter (now at WKAQ-TV)
- Daisy Sánchez, field reporter
- Roberto Cortes, weather anchor (now at WKAQ-TV)
- Carlos Weber, anchor (now at WOYE-FM)
- Arnaldo Ginés, anchor and field reporter
- Felipe Gomez Martinez, anchor (now at WAPA-TV)
- Eliezer Ramos Navarro, reporter (now at Lo sé todo)
- Susan Soltero, meteorologist (now at WXYX)
- Miriam Ramírez, field reporter
- Bruni Torres, anchor and field reporter (now at Radio Universidad)
- Avelino Muñoz Stevenson, sports reporter (deceased)
- Carmen Dominicci, reporter
- Mariliana Torres, anchor and field reporter (later at WSKN)
- Carlos Ochoteco, anchor and field reporter
- Myraida Chaves, anchor and field reporter (deceased)
- Zugey Lamela, anchor and field reporter (now at WKAQ-TV)
- Ada Monzón, meteorologist (now at WAPA-TV)
- Hector Vazquez Muñiz, sports anchor (now as secretary of the Puerto Rico Department of Sports and Recreation)
- Liza Lugo, entertainment reporter
- Ricardo Currás, anchor and field reporter (now at Punto Digital)
- Shirlyan Odette, anchor and field reporter (now at WTMO-CD)
- Arnaldo Rojas, investigative and field reporter
- Kelvin Meléndez, field reporter (now at WAPA-TV)
- Tatiana Ortiz, investigative and field reporter (later at WAPA-TV)
- Elsa Velazquez Santiago, field reporter (now at WAPA-TV)
- Luisa Benítez, field reporter (now at WAPA-TV)
- Jamiebeth González, field reporter (later at WAPA-TV)
- Yarimar Marrero, field reporter (now at WAPA-TV)
- Camille Cruz Chico, field reporter (now at KXTX-TV)
- Liam Rodriguez Muñoz, videojournalist (now at Gym For All in Caguas)
- Adriana Rozas Rivera, field reporter (now at WAPA-TV)
- Isaac Rosado Santos, field reporter and digital news producer (now at WAPA-TV)
- Reina Mateo, field reporter (now at El Vocero)
- Ariana Rivera Franco, field reporter (now at WAPA-TV)
- Luis Joel Aymat, sports reporter
- Alberto Sanchez Laó, videojournalist (now at WKAQ-TV)
- Melvin Feliciano Fernández, videojournalist
- Yesenia Torres Figueroa, field reporter (now at El Gordo y La Flaca)
- Gary Rodríguez, political analyst (now at El Poder del Pueblo)
- Alexandra Lúgaro, political analyst (now at Última Palabra)
- Andrea Rivera, entertainment reporter (now at En La Mañana)

== Awards and nominations ==
Since the show's revival in 2021, it has received multiple Emmy nominations and won the award for Best Evening Newscast Evening – Larger Markets and Daytime Newscast in 2022. The multiple Emmy trophies are displayed behind the anchor's desk at the studio during the broadcasts.

Year	Category	Nominee(s)	Result	Ref.
2022	Best Daytime Newscast	Las Noticias Ahora: Grito de Indignación	Won	
2022	Best Evening Newscast Evening – Larger Markets	Las Noticias: Prime	Won	
2022	Best Special Report on Diversity, Equity and Inclusion	Tra[N]s las rejas Manuel Crespo Feliciano	Won	
2022	Best Investigative Report	¿Barril de influencias?	Won	
2023	Investigative - Multiple Reports	La Naturaleza Habla Deborah Martorell, Yanicelis Torres, Emmanuel Morales, Frankie González	Won	
2023	Business/Consumer - News (no production time limit)	El Truco de los Marbetes Tatiana Ortiz	Nominated	
2023	Crime/Justice - News (single shift)	Sin Respuestas Asesinato de Jeimy Liz Luisa Benitez, Jonathan Santana Chaves	Won	
2023	Crime/Justice - News (single shift)	Le Echan el Guante a Narcotraficantes Wilmarie Mena Santiago	Won	
2023	Crime/Justice - News (no production time limit)	Cárceles En Puerto Rico: El Último Suspiro Yanicelis Torres, Reuel Torres Vargas, Manuel Crespo, Isabel Ortiz WLII-TV, San Juan, PR	Won	
2023	Diversity/Equity/Inclusion - News (no production time limit)	Trans las Rejas - El Rostro de Aurora Isabel Ortiz Jose R. Blanco Alvarez	Nominated	
2023	Environment/Science - News (no production time limit)	Isla de Tiburones Deborah Martorell, Jose R. Blanco Alvarez, Isabel Ortiz	Won	
2023	Military - News (no production time limit)	En Total Abandono la Antigua Base Naval Roosevelt Roads Orlando Cruz Crespo, Orville Collazo	Won	
2023	Politics/Government - News (no production time limit)	FEI: ¿Caudillos Contra La Corrupción? Nuria G. Sebazco Lugo, Jonathan Santana Chaves	Nominated	
2023	Politics/Government - News (no production time limit)	Cheque en Blanco Tatiana Ortiz	Nominated	
2023	Societal Concerns - News (no production time limit)	Pronóstico Reservado Arnaldo Rojas, Jonathan Santana, Isabel Ortiz	Nominated	
2023	Weather - News (single shift)	Real el Frío en Adjuntas Deborah Martorell	Nominated	
2024	Breaking News	Tiroteo en Tribunal de Caguas Kelvin Melendez, Joshua Soto	Nominated	
2024	Societal Concerns - News	Societal Concerns Melissa Correa Velazquez, Jonathan Santana Chaves, Mardelis Jusino Ortiz	Nominated	
2024	Diversity/Equity/Inclusion - News (no production time limit)	Más Alla del Silencio Shirlyan Odette	Won	
2024	Education - News	La Escuela del Astronauta Deborah Martorell, Yanicelis Torres	Nominated	
2024	Environment/Science	Volver a Casa: El Viaje de los Tinglares Erika Martinez, Carlos Tolentino Rosario, Alex Velez Cruz, Pedro Martinez, Dylan Colon, Diamaris Rivera	Nominated	
2024	Investigative - Multiple Reports	Resurge el Ladrido en la Playa del Condado Manuel Crespo Feliciano, Diamaris Rivera, Jonathan Santana Chaves	Won	
2024	Editing - News	Viacrucis en el Paraíso Jonathan Santana Chaves, Darleen Torres Marrero	Nominated	
