= Raymond y sus Amigos =

Puerto Rican live TV sketch comedy and variety show

- Title card for the show
- Also known as: RYSA
- Genre: Stand-up comedy; Satire; Political satire; Variety show; Sketch comedy
- Created by: Raymond Arrieta
- Starring: Raymond Arrieta; Jasond Calderón; Jorge Castro; Joealis Filippetti; Norwill Fragoso; Sara Jarque; JC Martínez; René Monclova; Miguel Morales; Mónica Pastrana; Lizmarie Quintana; Abraham Martí
- Country of origin: Puerto Rico
- Original language: Spanish

Production
- Executive producer: Tony Mojena
- Production locations: Telemundo Puerto Rico; San Juan, Puerto Rico
- Running time: 120 minutes (with commercials)
- Production company: Tony Mojena Entertainment

Original release
- Network: WKAQ-TV
- Release: June 24, 2014 – present

Raymond y sus Amigos (Spanish: Raymond and his Friends) is a Puerto Rican live television sketch comedy, political satire, and variety show created by Raymond Arrieta and developed by Tony Mojena that airs on Telemundo Puerto Rico. The show's recurring sketches often parody Puerto Rican culture and politics and are performed by the show's recurring cast, most of which have remained the same since the show's inception in 2014.

== History ==
Raymond Arrieta rose to prominence as a comedian in Puerto Rican television by presenting El Show de Raymond (Raymond's Show) on Televicentro (WAPA-TV) during the late 90s and early 2000s. In 2006, Televicentro was sold to InterMedia Partners which brought changes to the station, including the cancellation of El Show de Raymond. After his contract with WAPA-TV ended, Arrieta joined Telemundo (WKAQ-TV) in 2007 as the co-host of the daytime variety show Día a Día.

Arrieta was approached by Tony Mojena, who produces Día a Día, with the idea of reviving his sketch comedy show on WKAQ-TV which led to the development of Raymond y sus Amigos. On June 6, 2014, a press conference was held to announce the debut of the new show, on the event it was announced that the show would debut on Tuesday, June 24, 2014, and would air for two hours. The introduction of the show marked the first time WKAQ-TV featured original local programming in eight years.

The format of the show begins with a monologue by Arrieta, joined by a house band, followed by comedic sketches, and featured interview segments, more comedic sketches and a musical guest, although the episodes may not include the latter. The show's premiere episode had interviews with boxers Félix "Tito" Trinidad and Miguel Cotto, with Luis Fonsi served as the musical guest. The premiere episode was a success for the network and managed to trend on Twitter through a game of hashtags, encouraging viewers to participate.

The show takes place from Studio 2 at WKAQ-TV Studios in San Juan where El Show de las 12 originated, with a capacity of 300 guests. During the COVID-19 pandemic the show halted admitting audiences and was performed in front of essential personnel only. In late 2021, the show resumed welcoming audiences in separated clusters and wearing masks and returned admitting full audiences in 2023.

== Cast ==
The show is hosted and led by Raymond Arrieta and veteran comedians René Monclova, Jorge Castro and Miguel Morales. The show also held auditions to find newer talent and landed on Rosko Jaime, Joealis Filippetti, Norwill Fragoso, Mónica Pastrana, and Lirimar Castañeda. Joining them would be Abraham Martí, who had previously worked on sketch-comedy show TV Ilegal on WAPA-TV in the early 2000s, and Yeye Villanueva, who worked with Arrieta on El Show de Raymond on WAPA. On August 11, 2017, Lizmarie Quintana, who had previously worked with Martí on TV Ilegal, joined the cast. On August 22, 2023, it was announced during the show that comedian Jasond Calderón would be joining the cast of the show, who previously worked on TeleOnce's late-night talk show Acuéstate con Francis and had been off television following the show's cancellation in July 2022.

=== Current cast ===
- Raymond Arrieta
- Jasond Calderón
- Jorge Castro
- Joealis Filippetti
- Norwill Fragoso
- Sara Jarque
- JC Martínez
- René Monclova
- Miguel Morales
- Mónica Pastrana
- Lizmarie Quintana
- Abraham Martí

=== Former cast ===
- Rosko Jaime (now at TeleOnce)
- Lirimar Castañeda
- Nelson del Valle (now at WAPA TV)
- Carlos Ramírez
- Yeye Villanueva

=== Rosko Jaime's exit ===
During the tail-end of 2022, Rosko Jaime began missing episodes of the show. While he would eventually return to the program in early 2023, his exit from the cast became official in June 2023. Jaime portrayed the character of Luiso (nicknamed "Chupi"), a flamboyant gay man, who was often performed with exaggerated mannerisms and in a feminine manner on the show's Sex and the City parody called Men and the City. On June 6, 2023, Jaime expressed through his lawyer that he had been let go from the show because of his disagreement of the way the character was being written and considered the character and its storylines were verging on being offensive towards the LGBTQIA+ community. In Jaime's statement he said he expressed his concerns about the writing to executive producer Tony Mojena and WKAQ management but his complaints were not addressed by the production and instead he was notified he would no longer be appearing on the show. Jaime and Mojena came to an agreement behind closed doors for him to retain ownership of all the characters he portrayed on Raymond y sus Amigos and the two parted ways with Jaime shortly after joining rival network TeleOnce.

== Recurring sketches ==
The show features a variety of recurring sketches based on different characters, some presented in an episodic way with new stories presented weekly for the recurring characters.

=== Lead-ins ===
- Gato Encerrado con la Dra. Apolo: A parody of Caso Cerrado where Arrieta impersonates Ana María Polo as Dr. Apolo, litigating exuberant and odd cases between parties. Villanueva plays the court's sergeant-at-arms, who is easily jump-scared by Arrieta's gavel banging in the latter's impersonation of Polo, and speaks very broken, sometimes unintelligible English. Pastrana impersonates clinical psychologist Dr. Vivian González, who is always recommending both plaintiffs and defendants to be medicated, based on her knowledge of absurd areas of studies, some unrelated to the case. After the rising popularity of the sketch, the real Ana María Polo guest starred on the sketch as herself on January 13, 2015, confronting her counterpart.
- Men and the City: A parody of Sex and the City, following a group of friends, Carlos (a stay-at-home husband, played by Arrieta, with an overbearing wife), Mauricio (a financially-struggling divorcé, played by Monclova), Sammy (a womanizer, played by Castro) and Larry (a single man who enjoys dating older women, played by Morales), who meet weekly at a bar to talk about their relationships. Carlos' overbearing wife Linda (played by Filippetti) is constantly grilling him and talking him down, especially whenever she finds him at the bar with his friends, whom she vocally disapproves of sometimes. The bar is managed by Betty (played by Pastrana), who is often pushed around by the men and always excluded from their inner circle when it comes to discussing their relationships. Prior to his departure from the show, Jaime played Luiso (nicknamed "Chupi"), a flamboyant gay man and Betty's best friend and confidant, and the fifth member of the men's inner circle. Salsa singer Víctor Manuelle plays the bar's owner, whom occasionally guest stars on the sketch when he's the musical guest on the show.
- Don Raymisco: A parody of Sábado Gigante where Arrieta impersonates its host Don Francisco, in a singing and talent competition like the original, including a parody of the original show's character the Chacal de la Trompeta. A running gag in the sketch is Arrieta's impersonation always incorrectly referencing the competitors and judges as hailing from Mexico. The singing competition's judges include Morales impersonating Fernando Allende and Martí impersonating Horacio Villalobos, while the show's guest served as the third judge as themselves. Jaime was later added to the sketch impersonating Bad Bunny, prior to his departure from the show, while Quintana began replacing Martí on the sketch, impersonating La India.
- El Show De Los 4P: A parody/homage to the late Spanish clown trio of brothers Gaby, Miliki and Fofó (Los Payasos de la Tele) where the ringmaster Tato (played by Castro) leads the trio of clowns Tito (played by Monclova), Totito (played by Arrieta) and Totitito (played by Martí) to comment and sing about social issues in Puerto Rico, particularly those involving the Government of Puerto Rico. After Jarque joined the show, she joined the sketch as the fourth clown Totitita, and also serving as Martí's replacement when he's absent from the show.
- Guaraguao Security: An original sketch following a group of incompetent private security officers, in a style similar to that of Reno 911!.
- Lo Mio Es Mio

=== Irregulars ===
- ¡Es Mi Vida!: An original sketch following the life of a whining, spoiled and often narcissist teenage drama queen named Yelaika (played by Martí), her enabling father (played by Monclova) and their clueless but good-hearted neighbor Piru (played by Arrieta).
- La Oficina de LUMA: An original sketch mocking the customer service of Puerto Rico's energy provider, LUMA Energy.
- La Cuarteta: An original sketch following the adventures of a food truck owner.
- Última Pregunta: A parody of the political analysis program Primera Pregunta con Rafael Lenin López, featuring parodies of Puerto Rican political personalities.
- La Casa De Los Peposos: A parody of La Casa de los Famosos
- Los Collazos
- Edna y Dora
- Los Borrachitos
- ¡Arriba Puerto Rico!
- Los Pillos Finos
- Yvan el Ilusionista

== Former sketches ==
- Locavisión
- Noticias Telavi
- El Cantazo de Ojera
- Los Mozos
- U.P.P. (United Puertorican Postal)
- John "Tuti" Morales
- Los Bidos D'Tras
- Antes Muerta Que sencilla
