= Jugando Pelota Dura =

Puerto Rican talk-show program

- Title card for the show 2017-Present
- Also known as: Jugando Pelota Dura: Extra Inning (Extended Broadcast); JPD: Puerto Rico Habla (Monthly specials); Jugando Pelota Dura: Pre-Game (6:30p.m. broadcast)
- Genre: Political News; Opinion Program
- Created by: Ferdinand Perez
- Directed by: Jose "Cheo" Perez
- Presented by: Ferdinand Perez; Layza Torres; Margarita Aponte; Kimberly Santiago
- Country of origin: Puerto Rico
- Original language: Spanish

Production
- Executive producer: Ferdinand Perez
- Producers: Andrea Pagán; Kiana Perelló
- Camera setup: Multi-camera
- Running time: 60 Minutes (2017-2023); 90 Minutes (Extra Inning/Pre-Game) (2024-present); 120 Minutes (Puerto Rico Habla)
- Production companies: Liberman Media Group; Práctico Events

Original release
- Network: WUJA (2010-2012); WMTJ (2012-2017); Univision Puerto Rico (2017-2021); TeleOnce (2021-present)
- Release: 2010 – present

Related
- En La Mañana; Las Noticias

Jugando Pelota Dura is a Puerto Rican television talk show hosted by Ferdinand Pérez. The program initially premiered on NCN Television in 2010 before moving on to Sistema TV in 2012 and to Univision Puerto Rico (later, Teleonce) in 2017 after the passing of Hurricane Maria left WMTJ unable to broadcast the show. The show shares its name from Perez's radio show Pelota Dura (Hard Ball) that airs on WUNO. The program primarily features coverage of political issues and headlines, along with discussion from a panel of analysts and political figures.

== History ==
After serving 2 terms as a legislator for the PPD and a failed candidacy for the mayoral seat of San Juan, Puerto Rico, Ferdinand Perez launched Jugando Pelota Dura (Playing Hard Ball) on WMTJ (Sistema TV). The show focused on providing a platform to highlight issues that are affecting the people of Puerto Rico and allowed Perez to use his knowledge and connections to invite local politicians and discuss ways to address this issues. The original version of the show featured Perez alongside a panel of journalists and political analysts which included Yolanda Velez Arcelay, Alex Delgado, Millie Mendez and Zoe Laboy.

In 2017, after Hurricane Maria damaged the facilities of WMTJ, Jugando Pelota Dura was forced to find a new home and the show moved to WLII-DT which at the time was branded as Univision Puerto Rico. Jugando Pelota Dura premiered on Univision in December 2017 airing at the coveted 5:55pm time-slot, however, during the show's time in Univision the show was shuffled around the scheduled and moved time-slots several times which hurt it chances to hold an audience, 4 months after its premiere in April 2018 the show was moved to 9:00pm and two months later in June 2018 the show was moved to 7:00pm where it has remained since.

The show features Ferdinand Perez alongside a panel of journalist and a panel of guests who are related to the topics discussed on that day's episode. The original panel featured Zoe Laboy, Yolanda Velez Acerlay, Leo Aldridge and Denise Perez. In 2020, Alex Delgado (a journalist from WUNO) rejoined the cast and so did Margarita Aponte a journalist who previously had worked as anchor of Las Noticias before its initial closure in 2014. Laboy, Arcelay and Aldridge all left in 2022 to join WKAQ-TV in the show Rayos X after their exit JPD added to the panel Victor Hernandez and Cyd Marie Flemming, a long anchor of Las Noticias who returned to WLII-DT after an 8-year absence. Aponte and Flemming also perform hosting duties on occasions where Perez can not make it to the show.

Additionally, the show added Jailenne Rivera as a co-host. Rivera would be in charge of commercial break lead-ins and producing reports from the field. Rivera would eventually leave the show in 2023 with her role being filled by Kimberly Santiago moving forward.

On November 29, 2022, after speculation began that the show would move networks once again, Ferdinand Perez announced on his Instagram that he had renewed his contract with Liberman Media Group (owner of WLII-DT and its repeater). The contract would run for three more years which would renew Jugando Pelota Dura to stay on TeleOnce until, at least, 2025.

On May 27, 2026, veteran reporter Cyd Marie Flemming announced she would be leaving the show after being part of its panel for 5 years.

== Puerto Rico Habla ==
On August 28, 2022, the show premiered its new special Sunday edition called Jugando Pelota Dura: Puerto Rico Habla ('Puerto Rico Speaks'). The show works as a town hall meeting where a live audience is welcomed and encouraged to ask questions on social problems and a panel of experts and local politicians is present to respond to these issues and offer solutions. The specials air once a month on Sundays in the show's usual time slot of 7 p.m. Initially the show was set to take place from WLII's secondary studios at The Mall of San Juan, however, the production of the show has decided to take these specials live on the road with the last two airing live from Plaza Colón in Mayagüez and from Plaza Rafaél Hernandez in Aguadilla

== On-Air Staff ==
- Ferdinand Pérez - Host (2010–Present)
- Margarita Aponte - Host/Panelist (2018–Present)
- Victor Rivera Hernández - Panelist (2020–Present)
- Layza Torres - Host/Panelist (2025–Present)
- Kimberly Santiago - Social Media (2022–Present)
- Jorge Colberg Toro - Analyst (2024–Present)
- Humberto Mercader - Panelist (2026–Present)

=== Guests ===
- Jorge Schmidt Nieto - Guest Panelist
- Anabelle Torres Colberg - Directo al Punto

== Former On-Air Staff ==
- Alex Delgado (2010-2017, 2020–2025) - (deceased)
- Yolanda Vélez Arcelay (2014-2021) - (Now at WKAQ-TV)
- Leo Aldridge (2017-2019, 2021-2022) - (Now at WKAQ-TV)
- Millie Mendez (2010-2014) - (Now at WKAQ-TV)
- Zoe Laboy (2017-2020) - (Later at WKAQ-TV, Now at El Poder del Pueblo)
- Jailenne Rivera (2021-2023)
- Roberto Fuentes (2010-2012)
- Cyd Marie Fleming - Host/Panelist (2021-2026)
- Denisse Perez - Panelist (2017-2019, 2021–2026) Reporter (2012-2016) - (Now at WOYE and Prensa Abierta)
