= WLII-DT =

Television station in Caguas, Puerto Rico

- Caguas–San Juan; Puerto Rico
- City: Caguas, Puerto Rico
- Channels: Digital: 11 (VHF); Virtual: 11
- Branding: TeleOnce (general); Las Noticias (newscasts)

Programming
- Affiliations: 11.1: Spanish Independent; 11.2: Noticias 24/7

Ownership
- Owner: Liberman Media Group LLC

History
- Founded: 1960
- First air date: May 23, 1960 (Note: The Broadcasting and Cable Yearbook says May 27, while the Television and Cable Factbook says April 22.)
- Former call signs: WKBM-TV (1960–1985); WLII-TV (1985–2009)
- Former channel numbers: Analog: 11 (VHF, 1960–2009); Digital: 56 (UHF, 2004–2009)
- Former affiliations: Spanish Independent (1960–1981, 1986–2002); Dark (1981–1986); Univision (2002–2025)
- Call sign meaning: Lorimar-Telepictures, "11"

Technical information
- Licensing authority: FCC
- Facility ID: 19777
- ERP: 54.5 kW
- HAAT: 350 m (1,148 ft)
- Transmitter coordinates: 18°16′47″N 66°6′45″W
- Translator(s): WOLE-DT 12.1 Aguadilla; WSUR-DT 9.1 Ponce

Links
- Public license information: Public file; LMS
- Website: TeleOnce

WLII-DT (channel 11), branded TeleOnce, is a Spanish-language independent television station licensed to Caguas, Puerto Rico, serving the U.S. territory. Owned by Liberman Media Group, the station maintains studio facilities on Calle Carazo in Guaynabo. Its transmitter is located near the Bosque Estatal de Carite mountain reserve.

TeleOnce operates two satellite stations: WSUR-DT (channel 9) in Ponce and WOLE-DT (channel 12) in Aguadilla.

== History ==
=== Telecadena Perez-Perry (1960–1981) ===
In 1960, Rafael Perez Perry received authorization from the government to start WKBM-TV on May 23, broadcasting on channel 11 of San Juan, named shortly after "Telecadena Perez Perry" (Telechain Perez-Perry). On April 22, 1960, WKBM-TV broadcasts officially began on channel 11 of San Juan. The transmissions of Telecadena Pérez Perry originated on channel 11 of San Juan, and its signal was broadcast by channels 8 of Guayama (W08AB-TV) and 9 of Ponce (WSUR-TV). On October 12, 1974, channel 44 of Aguadilla (WVEO) was inaugurated to improve coverage in western Puerto Rico.

Some of the shows aired on WKBM-TV included:

- Una Hora Contigo and Tira y Tapate with Myrta Silva
- Yo Soy el Gallo with José Miguel Class
- El Show de Carmita with Carmita Jiménez
- El Show de Lissette, El Show de Iris Chacón, El Hit del Momento, and El Super Show Goya with Enrique Maluenda, Lillian Hurst, and Luz Odilia Font
- Una Chica llamada: Ivonne Coll and Cambia Cambia with Alfred D. Herger
- Almorzando and Del Brazo with Ruth Fernández
- Mediodia Circular with Vilma Carbia

In addition, Telecadena Pérez Perry broadcast telenovelas and productions from its partners in Peru, made by Panamericana Televisión (where it was called Panamericana Televisión Puerto Rico Inc.), and in Venezuela, made by Venevisión (where it was called Venevisión de Puerto Rico).

Under the leadership of Pérez Perry, Channel 11 became the first television channel in Puerto Rico with its newscast El 11 in Las Noticias, with a panel of journalists and a news presenter. Among the television news journalists who began their careers on Channel 11 were Silvia Gómez, Pedro Zervigón, and Carmen Jovet. It featured international reports, including news from the United States and Venezuela. There were also opinion programs like Puerto Rico.

Rafael Pérez Perry died on May 10, 1978, due to a heart attack while working on a Channel 11 transmitter on Cerro La Marquesa, located in the town of Aguas Buenas. His children continued to run the operations of Pérez Perry companies until September 4, 1981, when they declared bankruptcy and the operations of WKBM-TV ceased. the last program before the channel went silent was the news report Noche a Noche.

Its former competition benefited from WKBM's demise—not only from a reduction in competition itself, but also from the availability of many of the stations' former hosts and talent.

=== TeleOnce (1986–2002) ===
In 1985, production company Lorimar-Telepictures (with the Telepictures division now part of Warner Bros. Television) acquired the station from bankruptcy court. The callsign became WLII-TV on December 12, and was branded as 'TeleOnce' on April 27, 1986, with a new slogan: "TeleOnce... ¡Vívelo!" (lit. 'TeleOnce... Live it!').

Warner Communications (now part of Warner Bros. Discovery) gained indirect ownership of the stations after it bought Lorimar-Telepictures in 1988. The station became a success around this time by airing popular American programs translated in Spanish, especially The Simpsons. However, its lack of a repeater or rebroadcaster on the western portion of the island continued to put it behind the competition, WKAQ-TV (channel 2) and WAPA-TV (channel 4). This changed when WNJX-TV (channel 22) in Mayagüez signed an affiliation agreement with the station in the late 1980s. WLII was subsequently sold to Malrite Communications Group in 1991 after it sold WSTE-TV (channel 7); Malrite merged with Raycom Media in 1998.

On January 1, 1995, at midnight, TeleOnce entered into its first marketing agreement with a television station in western Puerto Rico, WORA-TV (channel 5), which at that time had ended an affiliation agreement with WKAQ-TV. In turn, WKAQ-TV switched its affiliation agreement to WOLE-TV (channel 12), which was WAPA-TV's repeater station at the time; this left WAPA-TV out of the western Puerto Rico television market for the first time in 30 years.

Some of the shows that aired on WLII during this time included:

- En Un Día, R con R
- El Show de Awilda
- Dime la Verdad
- Ellas al Mediodía
- La Noche es Nuestra
- Fiesta
- A Fuego
- Pulso Preciso
- Lio
- El Super Show
- Que Suerte que es Domingo
- Anda Pa'l Cará
- Entrando por la Cocina
- NBA Jam
- Atácate (a Spanish-language version of NBA Inside Stuff)
- El Kiosko Budweiser

In addition, the station aired live boxing fights during the weekends—some of which were hosted and promoted by Ivonne Class, the first Puerto Rican woman to become a boxing promoter.

In the late 1980s, actresses Ángela Meyer and Camille Carrión founded Empresas Meca, a production company, which produced some of the last telenovelas shot in Puerto Rico: La Isla, Ave de Paso (starring Yolandita Monge), Yara Prohibida, and La Otra.

=== Univision Puerto Rico (2002–2021) ===
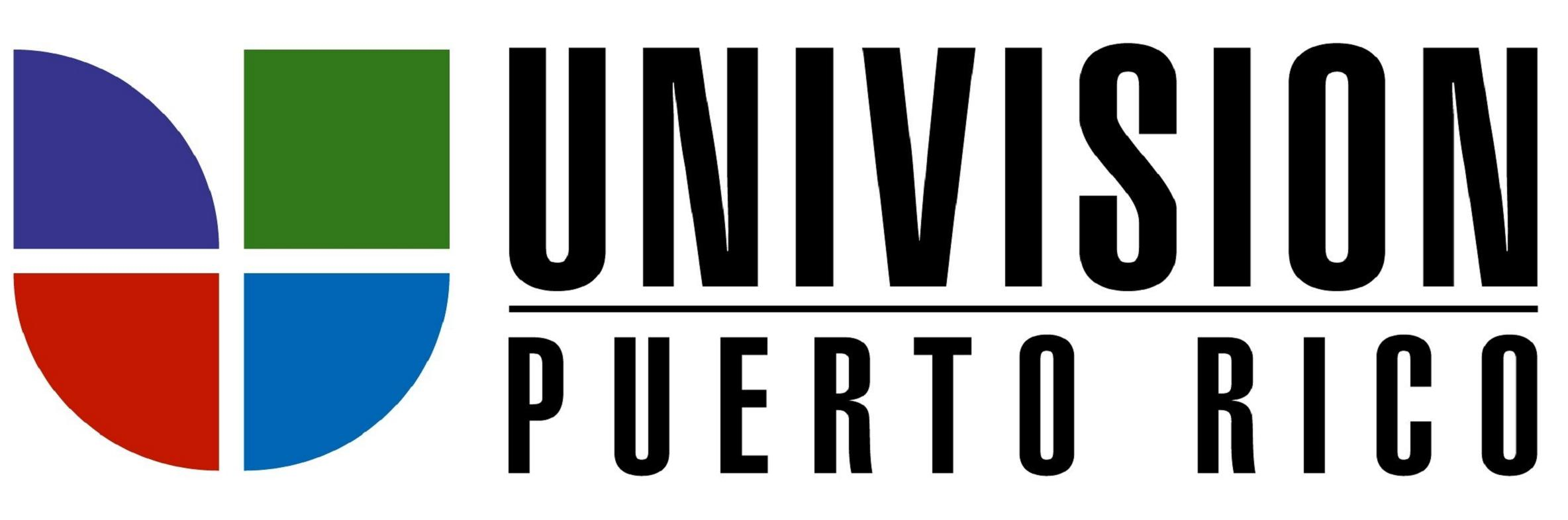
WLII's logo from 2002 to December 31, 2012

In 2002, Univision entered into a local marketing agreement with Raycom Media to operate WLII and WSUR-TV. At the time, WLII had a longtime local marketing agreement with another Puerto Rican station, WSTE (channel 7), which Univision honored. Both WLII and WSUR-TV were sold to Univision Communications in 2005; Univision bought WSTE at the end of 2007. Although Univision operated a second network, UniMás, in the mainland United States, WSTE remained an independent station. In 2005, WLII relocated from its studios in the Puerta de Tierra area of San Juan to a new facility in Guaynabo.

On October 17, 2014, WLII-DT laid off 109 staffers and canceled most of its local programming, becoming a repeater of Univision network programming with minimal local content. With the move, the station's daily talk show, Ruben & Co., became the only local program still produced by WLII. In addition, WLII shared a general manager with Univision's Puerto Rico radio stations.

On February 25, 2020, investment firms ForgeLight (launched by founder, CEO, and ex-Viacom CFO Wade Davis) and Searchlight Capital agreed to acquire the 64% controlling stake of Univision Communications which owned WLII-DT, while minority owner Televisa continued to hold its 36% stake with the company. However, both Searchlight and ForgeLight had a stake in Hemisphere Media Group, which owns WAPA-TV in San Juan. Univision was required to divest WLII and its satellite stations in order to comply with ownership limits.

=== Liberman purchase and the return of TeleOnce (2021–present) ===
On August 27, 2020, Univision announced that WLII and its satellite stations would be acquired by Liberman Media Group, a company owned by Estrella Media founder Lenard Liberman, for $1 million each. The sale was completed on December 10, 2020. Univision retained WSTE-DT, WKAQ-AM, and WKAQ-FM. It was also reported that WLII would bring back the TeleOnce branding, which the station used for 15 years from 1986 to 2002. On January 19, 2021, Liberman Media Group named Winter Horton as the new general manager for the station.

WLII-DT (and its repeaters) aired as Univision Puerto Rico until February 18, 2021, when the on-screen branding switched to TeleOnce at 8 p.m. The station held a press conference unveiling the new station logo and a new slate of programming, which included the return of local newscasts after more than six years since the dissolution of the original news department. Longtime WAPA-TV news director José Enrique Cruz was named as an adviser for the newly established news department. The debut of new shows, like Ahora Es que Es and a new season of La Comay, brought high ratings for the revamped network.

On March 2, 2021, WLII's second digital subchannel launched as a UniMás affiliate, branded as UniMás Puerto Rico.

On July 2, 2021, Liberman Media Group and TeleOnce entered a distribution agreement with SBS operated stations WACX-DT11 in Orlando, Florida, (Note: WACX is owned by Associated Christian Television System, Inc. (ACTS), with SBS leasing subchannel space from ACTS.) and WGCT-LD in Tampa, Florida, to show TeleOnce programming on their stations. Local programs La Comay, Jugando Pelota Dura, and Ahora Es que Es began airing on Mega TV stations either live or on the same day they originally aired in Puerto Rico. This agreement marked the first time that local Puerto Rican programming was exported to the mainland United States since the launch of WAPA America in 2004.

On December 8, 2021, WLII-DT unveiled their new studio facility at The Mall of San Juan. The facility, which occupies one of the empty anchor spaces at the shopping center, was unveiled during the station's upfront presentation which was held at the site. The station's new game show, La Boveda de Mr. Cash, was the first to broadcast live from the new studios when it premiered on March 1, 2022.

On December 16, 2025, it was announced that TelevisaUnivision would be ending their affiliation agreement with WLII after 23 years, this would leave WLII without any imported programming from Univision or UniMas, a move that forced them to stop broadcasting out of the 11.2 subchannel. Although the change was to take effect on January 1, 2026, it actually began on December 30, 2025, when all TelevisaUnivision programming moved to their owned-and-operated station WSTE-DT. WLII plans on covering the hours left without programming by expanding the run time of shows such as Las Noticias and En La Mañana.

=== TeleOnce América ===
On July 28, 2025, Liberman Media announced the launch of TeleOnce América, a FAST channel that will bring the network's programming to viewers in the mainland United States. The channel broadcasts 24 hours of content with simulcasts of every original show that airs on WLII from 7 a.m. to midnight.

TeleOnce América is set to launch on August 4, 2025, and will be available on Plex, Amazon Freevee, FlixLatino, BeondTV and WISPTV with more services expected to carry it in the near future.

=== WSUR-TV history (1958–present) ===
WSUR-TV was founded on February 20, 1958, by American Colonial Broadcasting. In 1963, the station was located on Avenida Tito Castro (Puerto Rico Highway 14) in the La Rambla sector of Barrio Machuelo Abajo; its transmitter tower was located within the municipality of Guayanilla, Puerto Rico, and it was an affiliate of WAPA-TV, but carried two local programs from Ponce. The station transmitted its analog signal over VHF channel 9.

Currently, WSUR originates no local programming of its own. Its tower is now located at Cerro Jayuya in the border between the municipality of Ponce with Jayuya.

== Programming ==
=== Current programming ===
Currently TeleOnce produces 14 hours of original programming on weekedays featuring an array of shows such as La Bóveda de Teleonce, Jugando Pelota Dura, P.R. En Vivo, among others.

Programming blocks are bookended by Las Noticias Teleonce (TeleOnce News) which airs its morning edition at 6 a.m. and Última Edición at 10 p.m.

All of TeleOnce's original programming is broadcast live from the station's studios in Guaynabo, Puerto Rico, with the exception of the morning program En La Mañana which has its own studio in the Paseo Caribe Complex in Old San Juan and La Bóveda de Teleonce which also has its own studio at the Alejandro Jr. Cruz Fine Arts Center in Guaynabo.

=== Las Noticias (1986–2014, 2021–present) ===
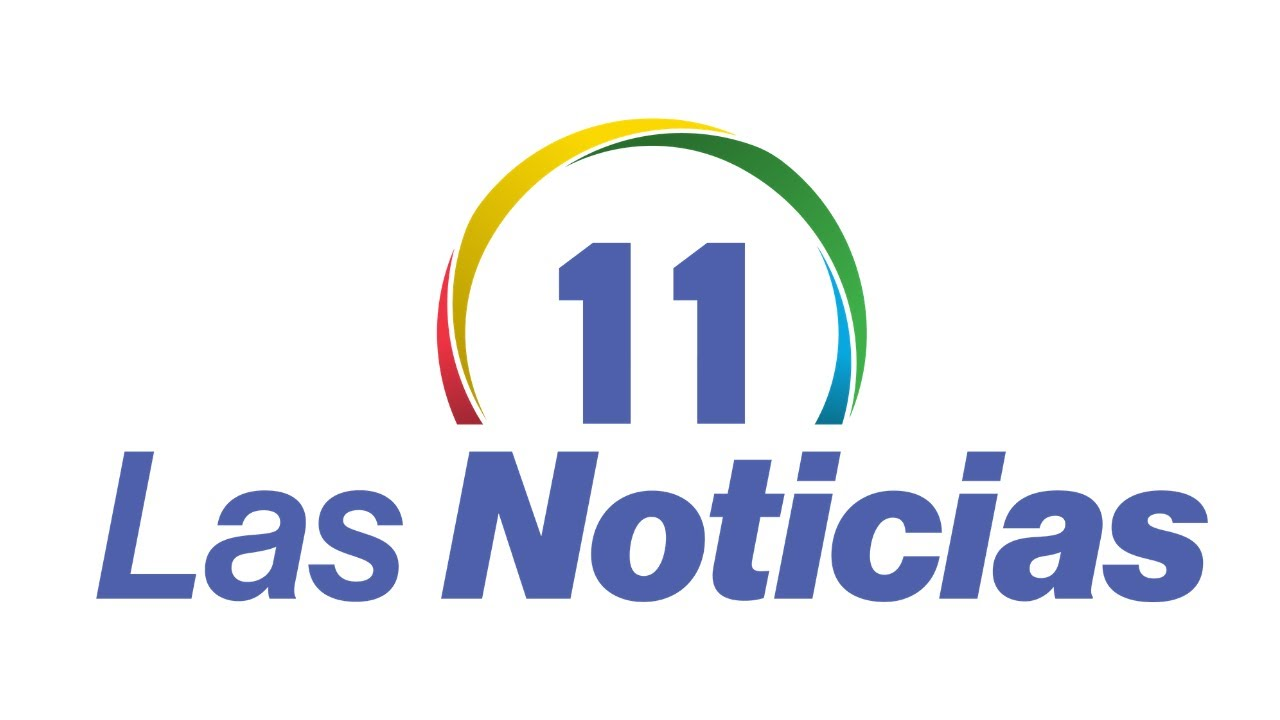
Current logo of Las Noticias

Las Noticias Teleonce is the flagship news program for WLII and its repeater stations, it is currently anchored by Celimar Adames Casalduc during its afternoon editions and Shirlyan Odette during its night edition.

The news program originated in 1986 and ran four editions weekdays and two on weekends until its abrupt cancellation in 2014 by Univision who decided to close the station's news department. In 2020, Univision sold TeleOnce to Liberman Media Group and the new ownership quickly reopened the station's news department and revived Las Noticias.

=== Tu Mañana/En La Mañana (1991–2014, 2023–present) ===
On March 11, 1991, a weekday morning news program, Tu Mañana, made its debut; the program was anchored by Carlos Ochoteco and Cyd Marie Fleming and featured segments such as panels of experts on different topics. Over the course of its history the program was hosted by Burni Torres and Felipe Gomez, Nuria Sebazco and Elwood Cruz, and finally, Grisell Mamery and Gredmarie Colón. After the closure of the station's news department, Tu Mañana was canceled. The show's revival finally arrived in 2023 after Liberman Media Group's purchase of WLII from Univision. The new version of the show is called En La Mañana and it premiered on October 30, 2023.

== Technical information ==
=== Subchannels ===
The stations' signals are multiplexed:

Subchannels of WLII-DT and WSUR-DT
Channel		Res.	Short name		Programming
WLII-DT	WSUR-DT	Res.	WLII-DT	WSUR-DT	Programming
11.1	9.1	1080i	WLII-DT	WSUR-DT	Main programming
11.2	9.2	720p	ELII-DT		Noticias 24/7

=== Analog-to-digital conversion ===
WLII shut down its analog signal on June 12, 2009, the official date on which full-power television stations in the United States transitioned from analog to digital broadcasts under federal mandate. The station's digital signal relocated from its pre-transition UHF channel 56 to VHF channel 11, which was among the high band UHF channels (52–69) that were removed from broadcasting use as a result of the transition. WSUR switched to digital-only broadcasts on January 23, 2009, broadcasting on VHF channel 9 (or virtual channel 9.1).

=== Satellite, repeater, and translator stations ===
WLII programming can be seen across Puerto Rico on the following stations:

Station	City of license	Channels	First air date	ERP	HAAT	Facility ID	Transmitter coordinates	Public license information
WOLE-DT	Aguadilla	12 (VHF); 12	May 10, 1960	47.5 kW	661 m (2,169 ft)	71725	18°9′0″N 66°59′0″W	Public file LMS
WSUR-DT	Ponce	9 (VHF); 9	February 20, 1958	21.6 kW	857 m (2,812 ft)	19776	18°10′9″N 66°34′36″W	Public file LMS
W21CX-D	Mayaguez	21 (UHF); 12	1996	18.1 kW	0.2 m (1 ft)	71730	18°18′51″N 67°11′30″W	LMS
