= List of programs broadcast by WAPA-TV =

This is the list of programs that are being broadcast by WAPA-TV television network in Puerto Rico. WAPA-TV for years has shown boxing, BSN basketball, telenovelas, movies, comedies, sitcoms (both American and domestic), baseball, NFL football, both World Wrestling Entertainment (WWE) and Puerto Rican World Wrestling Council (WWC) professional wrestling and human interest shows. Current day programming originating from the major American English broadcast networks is replaced with alternate programming on the national WAPA America feed.

== Former Programming ==
- Despierta Puerto Rico
- Hoy
- Chicola y La Ganga
- Ahí Viene Iris Chacón
- El Condominio (2000-2005)
- Club Sunshine (2000-2009)
- El Show de Raymond (1998-2005)
- SuperXclusivo (2000-2013)
- Entre Nosotras (2007-2016)
- TV Ilegal (2006-2009)
- El Tiempo es oro con Mr. Cash (2013-2015)
- Sunshine Remix (2009-2014)
- Risas en Combo (2010-2016)
- Juntos en la Mañana (2016-2017)
- Mónica en Confianza (2009-2011)
- Mete Mano
- Sunshine's Café
- Entrando por la Cocina
- El Show del Mediodia
- Mediodia Puerto Rico (1999-2009)
- Sacando Chispa
- Gana con Ganas (2015-2016)
- Hello WAPA
- Todo Va
- Estudio 360
- El Papá De Mi Papá
- Estudio Luis Vigoreaux
- ¿Que es lo que pasa aqui? ¡Ah!
- De Magazín
- ¿Quién Balia Mejor? (2007-2008)
- A Millón
- Aplausos
- Solteros Siempre
- Cine Recreo con Pacheco
- Contra El Reloj con Pacheco
- Pacheco A Las Tres
- Arriba WAPA con Pacheco
- El Circo de Pacheco
- La Hora de la Aventura/Aventuras Por El 4
- Sube, Nene, Sube
- El Kiosko Budweiser
- Primera Plana (2008)
- A Calzon Quita'o (2006-2008)
- Se Caen de la Matta (2006-2007)
- Zúmbate (2001-2007)
- Transformación Total (2009-2011)
- WAPA A Las Cuatro (2011-2019)
- Burbu Nite (2022)
- Café Teatro El Fogón (2005-2007)
- Por El Casco de San Juan
- Jangueo TV (2007-2016)
- Ojeda
- Ahora Podemos Hablar
- Controversial
- Otra Cosa (2000-2004)
- Tres al Día (1998-2000)
- Frente al Desastre
- Lo Que Hortensia Se Llevó
- Idol Puerto Rico (2011-2013)
- Idol Kids Puerto Rico (2012-2013)
- Guerreros (reality show)
- Club TV
- Casos Inesperados
- Carcajadas y Algo Mas
- El Colegio de la Alegría
- Ja, ja, jiji, jo, jo con Agrelot
- El Profesor Colgate
- El Hit Parade
- El Show Libby's
- En Casa de Luis Raul
- Taller San Miguel
- Estas Pega'o
- Quedaste Retrata'o
- Esto No Tiene Nombre
- Comedia Inc. (2017)
- El Chorrito Resort & Spa
- La Tripleta
- He Vuelto a Vivill
- Al Aire Libre (1990-1992)
- ¡Qué Vacilón! (1992-1995)
- La Epidemia de la Risa (1996-1998)
- La Reunión (2024)
- Buenos Días, Entérese
- Rancho WAPA
- Texaco Informa

== Current programming ==
=== Weekday ===
- NotiCentro Al Amanecer (news)
- Arelys: Canto Para No Llorar (telenovela)
- Fruto Prohibido (telenovela)
- NotiCentro 11am (news)
- Pégate al Mediodía (talk/variety show)
- ¡Viva la Tarde! (variety show)
- Lo sé todo (talk show)
- Los Datos son los Datos con Jay Fonseca (analysis show)
- NotiCentro Edición Estelar (news)
- Hermanos: La Fuerza del Amor (telenovela)
- Función Estelar (movies)
- ¡Claro Que Baila! (reality show)
- Super Chef Celebrities (reality show)
- Más Allá del Amor (telenovela)
- NCIS: Hawai'i (series)
- NCIS (series)
- El Remix (comedy)
- La Combi (comedy)
- Chicago P.D. (series)
- Law & Order: SVU (series)
- The Good Doctor (series)
- S.W.A.T. (series)
- Ahí Está la Verdad (investigative show)
- NotiCentro Edición Nocturna (news)

=== Weekend ===
- Glitch Techs (children; Weekends at 5am)
- Make It Pop (children; Weekends at 5:30am)
- Cleopatra in Space (children; Saturdays at 6am)
- Shimmer and Shine (children; Saturdays at 6:30am)
- Iglesia Bethel (religious)
- Autógrafo Kids (children)
- Autógrafo al Día (children)
- NotiCentro Al Amanecer Fin de Semana (news)
- Perreo TV (pet show)
- WWE SmackDown (Spanish version; wrestling)
- Las Súperestrellas De la Lucha Libre (wrestling)
- NotiCentro Fin de Semana (news)
- En Una Semana (news)
- La Guarida del Tiburón (entertainment show)

=== Online programs ===
- Somos Salud
- Backstage Zone
- D Película
- Dog Guru
- WAPA Podcasts
- Cocina 787
- El Talento Detras de la Camara
- Clic Empresarial
- Voces de Reinas

== See also ==
- WAPA-TV
- Telemundo
- WNJX-TV

== External links and sources ==
- Official website
- The Museum of Broadcasting - Puerto Rico TV Profile
