= Super Chef Celebrities =

Puerto Rican reality competition cooking show

- Genre: Reality competition; Cooking show
- Presented by: Luis Ponce
- Judges: Giovanna Huyke; Enrique Piñeiro; José Edgardo Lucca; Héctor Rosa
- Country of origin: Puerto Rico
- Original language: Spanish
- No. of seasons: 4

Production
- Running time: 90 minutes
- Production company: WAPA Media Group

Original release
- Network: WAPA
- Release: May 21, 2024 – present

Super Chef Celebrities (also branded as Super Chef Celebrities presented by: Econo) is a Puerto Rican reality competition television series which premiered on WAPA on May 21, 2024. The show features celebrities competing against each other in culinary challenges. The contestants are judged by a panel of professional chefs and other notables from the food and wine industry, with one or more contestants eliminated in each episode. The show is produced by WAPA Media Group and it is hosted by comedian Luis Ponce.

The third season of the show ended on May 12, 2025, the show has been renewed for a fourth season which premiered on September 9, 2025.

== Show Format ==
A group of celebrities have their cooking skills put to the test and are judged by a panel of professional chefs with one contestant eliminated each week. The winner receives the grand cash prize of $40,000.

During the start of the cycle, celebrities will receive a list of ingredients and a general idea of what the recipe they're preparing will be. However, contestants must listen to the judges' instructions on how to prepare the dish and write those instructions down as they are not provided step by step recipes. After listening to the instructions, contestants will have 4 minutes to go look for the ingredients listed, the utensils to cook and the dinnerware to serve the final product.

At the end of each episode the lowest scoring celebrity will advance to La Vara (The Rod Challenge) where they will prepare another recipe in the hopes of being saved from elimination. The celebrity with the lowest score during the Vara Round will then participate on El Fogón Challenge where the contestant with the lowest score will be eliminated from the show.

== Series overview ==
Season	Winner	Runner-up	Original air dates
1	Saudy Rivera	Luis "Bebesauro" Morales	May 21 - July 29, 2024
2	Gabriela Quiñones	Alfonsina Molinari	September 17 - November 25, 2024
3	Natasha Isel	Kerópi Sánchez	January 28 - May 12, 2025
4	Luis "Bebesauro" Morales and Franco Micheo	Kerópi Sánchez and Marena Sofía	September 9 - December 8, 2025

=== Season 1 ===
12 celebrities were selected to participate in season 1 of Super Chef Celebrities. Host of Lo sé todo Saudy Rivera was crowned as the winner.

- Braulio Castillo Jr., actor
- Gricel Mamery, television host
- Luis Morales "El Bebesauro", social media personality
- Iván Calderón, athlete
- **Saudy Rivera**, host of Lo sé todo
- Luisito Vigoreaux, television host and producer
- Melina León, singer/songwriter
- Jennifer Fungenzi, social media personality
- Giancarlo Cavallero, social media personality
- Franco Micheo, comedian
- Miss Gala, social media personality

bold denotes winner of the season

=== Season 2 ===
The second season of Super Chef Celebrities was announced on September 3, 2024. 12 celebrities were chosen to participate. Season 2 premiered on September 17, 2024. Social Media Personality, Gabriela Quiñones was crowned as the winner on November 25, 2024.

- Alfonsina Molinari, actress
- Iván Calderón, athlete (Note: Calderón withdrew from the competition during season 1 to attend his induction ceremony at the International Boxing Hall of Fame and was later invited to come back and compete on season 2)
- **Gabriela Quiñones, social media personality**
- Angie Rivers, comedian
- Ivana Carolina Irizarry, Model and Beauty Pageant Winner
- Kedward Avilés, singer/song writer
- Otilio Warrington "Bizcocho", actor/comedian
- Adriana Filomeno, social media personality
- Ali Warrington, radio host KQ-105
- Yasmín Mejías, actress, comedian and politician
- Normando Valentín, anchor of NotiCentro Edición Estelar
- Carla Cortijo, Former WNBA Player

bold denotes winner of the season

=== Season 3 ===
Season 3 of Super Chef Celebrities was announced on January 18, 2025 and it was promoted as the "longest season yet" due to an increase in contestants. 18 celebrities were selected to participate. Season 3 premiered on January 28, 2025 simulcasting on both WAPA and its FAST Channel WAPA+. Natasha Isel was crowned winner of the season on May 12, 2025

- Chicky Starr, professional wrestler
- **Natasha Isel, social media personality**
- David Huertas, BSN basketball player
- Keiry Narváez, social media personality
- Reynold Alexander, magician
- Noris Joffre, actress and comedian
- Keropi Sanchez, comedian
- Catherine Castro, host of Lo sé todo
- Manny Manuel, singer
- Jennifer Colón, Miss Universe Puerto Rico 2024
- Josué Carrión, television host
- Uka Green, writer and columnist
- Gianluca Perotti, comedian
- Juliana Rivera, actress
- Jorge Luis Ramos, filmmaker
- Victoria Sanabria, singer
- Freddo Vega, comedian
- Marena Sofía, social media personality

bold denotes winner of the season

=== Season 4 ===
The fourth season of the competition was announced on August 26, 2025 and it premiered on September 9, 2025. Dubbed Super Chef Celebrities: All Stars, the season features celebrities from previous seasons which are working in pairs in hope to beat the challenges. Franco Micheo and Luis "Bebesauro" Morales were crowned the winning pair on December 8, 2025.

- Josue Carrión "Mr. Cash", Game Show Host
- Jorge Luis Ramos, filmmaker
- David Huertas, BSN basketball player
- Keiry Narváez, social media personality
- Alex Díaz, KQ 105 Radio Host (withdrew from competition)
- Yaiza Figueroa, actress
- **Franco Micheo, comedian**
- **Luis Morales "Bebesauro", social media personality**
- Marena Sofia, social media personality
- Manny Manuel, singer
- Luisito Vigoreaux, television host and producer
- Jennifer Fungenzi, host of Pégate Al Mediodía (re-entered competition post-elimination after Alex Diaz withdrew)
- Fredo Vega, comedian and radio host
- Carla Cortijo, Former WNBA Player
- Keropi Sánchez, comedian
- Ali Warrington, KQ 105 Radio Host
- Otilio Warrington "Bizcocho", comedian
- Adriana Filomeno, host of Viva La Tarde
- Melina León, singer
- Juliana Rivera, actress
- Catherine Castro, host of Lo sé todo (entered competition after Luisito Vigoreaux withdrew)

bold denotes winners of the season

Several contestants left the competition before being eliminated. Radio Host, Alex Diaz left as a result of a dispute between him and his partner Yaiza Figueroa. Jennifer Fungenzi was brought back after being eliminated to replace Diaz in the competition. Meanwhile, Luisito Vigoreaux left due to disputes with the production and his partner Fredo Vega. Catherine Castro was brought in to take Vigoreaux's place in the competition.

== Production ==
=== Development ===
After the end of its previous Reality Show Guerreros (Warriors), WAPA Media Group was looking to develop a new reality show to occupy its prime time slot. On March 12, 2024, WAPA announced that their next project would be a celebrity cooking reality show called Super Chef Celebrities. Chef Enrique Piñeiro (who works on the stations Viva La Tarde Show), Chef Giovanna Huyke and "Pit Master" José Edgardo Lucca were announced as the judges on the competition during a special press conference.

The first cast of celebrities was announced on April 23, 2024 and it included actor Braulio Castillo Jr., television host Luisito Vigoreaux, singer Melina León, among other known influencers and personalities from WAPA-TV. The show premiered on May 21, 2024 at 7:00 p.m.

The show is taped at Luis Vigoreaux studio at WAPA-TV Headquarters in Guaynabo. For its production WAPA installed 6 cooking stations in the center area of the studio with the entire back area equipped to be a supermarket featuring a produce section, an area for dry goods, fridges for dairy and meat products and an area where all the cookware is stored. The supermarket section has been supplied by Econo Supermarkets who also serves as the main sponsor of the program.

=== Casting ===
Luis Ponce, who also works as a performer on the station's comedy program "La Combi" was tapped in to host the program. Ponce has acted as host on every regular season of the show however for its holiday special season, radio personality (and season 2 contestant) Ali Warrington acted as host.

At the end of season 2, Pit Master José Edgardo Lucca announced he would be exiting the program to focus on his restaurant. Chef Héctor Rosa replaced him as judge for season 3.

== Super Chef Celebrities: Fogón Edition ==
After season 2 of Super Chefs wrapped up WAPA announced that the show would continue during the holiday season with a special edition of the program. The spin-off season was dubbed Super Chef Celebrities: Fogón Edition. On this edition the participants would be exclusively talent that works on WAPA Media Group be it on Television or Radio and there would be an elimination on every episode (daily). The winner of this special edition would get a $10,000 prize awarded to the charity of their choice and automatic pass to participate on season 3 of Super Chef Celebrities. The competition would run for 2 weeks and be hosted by KQ-105 personality Ali Warrington.

Noticentro Al Amanecer host Jose Santana won the competition on December 16, 2024 and awarded the $10,000 prize to Hogar Mis Primeros Pasos (a non-profit that assists children who have been victim of abuse). Santana, however, chose not to participate on season 3 of the show and gifted his earned spot on the competition to Lo sé todo host Catherine Castro

=== Cast ===
==== Contestants ====
- Katiria Soto, anchor NotiCentro
- **José Santana, host NotiCentro Al Amanecer**
- José Emilio Pérez “Don Emilio”, analyst WAPA Deportes
- Sandro Giulimondi, collaboratior NotiCentro
- Robert Fantacuca as "Yoyo Ferran", radio personality KQ-105
- Nicole Chacón, Entertainment reporter for NotiCentro
- Diane Ferrer, host "Viva La Tarde"
- Catherine Paola Castro, host Lo sé todo
- Maurim Chiclana, comedian "El Remix"
- Natasha Ortiz, comedia "El Remix"

bold denotes winner of the competition

==== On-air staff ====
- Ali Warrington, host
- Giovanna Huyke, judge
- Chef Juan Baéz, judge
- Chef Hector Rosa, judge
