= WKAQ =

WKAQ may refer to:

- WKAQ (AM), a radio station (580 AM) licensed to San Juan, Puerto Rico, United States
- WKAQ-FM, a radio station (104.7 FM) licensed to San Juan, Puerto Rico, United States
- WKAQ-TV, a television station (PSIP channel 2/RF channel 28) licensed to San Juan, Puerto Rico, United States
