= WUKQ =

WUKQ may refer to:

- WUKQ (AM), a radio station (1420 AM) licensed to serve Ponce, Puerto Rico, which simulcasts WKAQ
- WUKQ-FM, a radio station (99.1 FM) licensed to serve Mayaguez, Puerto Rico, which simulcasts WKAQ-FM
- WEPN (AM), a radio station (1050 AM) licensed to serve New York, New York, United States, which used the call sign WUKQ from October 1988 to February 1989
