= ¡Claro Que Baila! =

Puerto Rican dance competition television series

- Title card for the show
- Genre: Reality competition
- Presented by: Karla Monroig; Angie Rivers; Dianne Ferrer
- Judges: Sophie Sanfiorenzo; Bryan Villarini; Lumarie Landrau Fernández
- Country of origin: Puerto Rico
- Original language: Spanish
- No. of seasons: 2
- No. of episodes: 83

Production
- Production location: Luis Vigoreaux Studio at WAPA-TV
- Running time: 120 minutes (with commercials)
- Production company: WAPA Media Group

Original release
- Network: WAPA
- Release: May 21, 2025 – present

Related
- Super Chef Celebrities

¡Claro Que Baila! (Spanish for, Of course they can dance!) is a Puerto Rican competition television series that premiered on WAPA on May 21, 2025. The show is based on American competition Dancing with the Stars and British competition Strictly Come Dancing. The show pairs local Puerto Rican celebrities and influencers with professional dancers. Each couple competes against the others for judges' points. The couple receiving the lowest combined total of judges' points runs the risk of elimination each cycle until only the champion dance pair remains. The last celebrity standing wins a prize of $40,000. The series is hosted by Dianne Ferrer and Angie Rivers.

== History ==
After the success of previous Reality Series Super Chef Celebrities, WAPA began the development of other realities that could occupy the prime time 7:00pm time slot while Super Chefs was on break. Originally announced with the name Baila (Spanish for Dance!), WAPA Media Group announced the new show on April 23, 2025 in a press conference where they also announced the judges of the competition would be Sophie Sanfiorenzo, Bryan Villarini and Lumarie Fernández.

On May 13, 2025, it was announced that telecommunications service provider Claro Puerto Rico would be joining the show as its main sponsor and the name of the brand would be added to the name of the show thus becoming ¡Claro Que Baila! on that same press conference the show introduced its 15 participants and actress Karla Monroig was also introduced as the show's main host.

The show premiered live on May 21, 2025 from Studio Luis Vigoreaux at WAPA-TV Headquarters in Guaynabo. WAPA Media touted the premiere as a success with the show obtaining an 11.3% share in overall homes and a 10.4% on the coveted 18-35 demographic.

Season 1 of Claro Que Baila ended on July 14, 2025 with Karla Gilfú winning the competition along with its $40,000 prize. According to data released by Nielsen and WAPA it was the most watched program on Puerto Rican television during its first season, a second season has been confirmed by WAPA Media.

Season 2 of the competition began on May 26, 2026. For the second season, it was announced that Monroig would not return as host and the show would instead be hosted by Diane Ferrer. 15 celebrities were announced for the season featuring a mix of social media personalities, actors, radio hosts and WAPA Media personalities.

Season 2 of the show ended on July 27, 2026, and saw retired MLB infielder Iván DeJesús Jr. win the competition by beating Samarys Barbot, Alyssa Hunter and Patricia Corcino to earn the $40,000 prize. The season two finale of the show was a ratings success holding a over 47% of the 18-54 demographic in Puerto Rican homes.

== Contestants ==
=== Season 1 ===
- Veronique Abreu Tañón, journalist WKAQ 580
- Eduardo “Gali” Galarza, influencer
- Mía Blakeman, actress
- Guillermo Villa, influencer
- Bri, la Pelúa, singer/songwriter
- Miguel Alí Berdiel, athlete
- Marisa Baigés, TV Host

- Modesto Lacén, actor
- Larissa Dones, influencer
- Juan Zayas, athlete
- Celimar Rivera, activist
- Edgar Rivera, influencer
- **Karla Guilfú Acevedo, Miss Puerto Rico Universe 2023**
- Charlie Massó, singer
- Lynette Chico, radio host

bold denotes winner of the season

=== Season 2 ===
- Jesse Calderón, TV Host at WIPM-TV and Radio Personality
- Sartiza Alvarado, TV Host at WIPM-TV
- Patricia Corcino, Social Media Personality
- Allen Yadiel, Boxer
- Adrianna Fontánez, Actress
- Bryan Reyes, Social Media Personality
- Chicle Clown, Social Media Personality

- Samarys Barbot, TV Host
- Ricardo Álvarez, Actor
- **Iván DeJesús Jr., Former MLB player**
- Alyssa Hunter, Drag Performer
- Gustavo Ortiz, Social Media Personality
- Jennifer Fungenzi, host of Pégate Al Mediodía
- Heyda Salamán, Actress and Comedian
- Neira Ortíz, Volleyball Player

bold denotes winner of the season

== On-air talent ==
=== Season 1 ===
- Karla Monroig, host
- Angie Rivers, backstage correspondent
- Zoe Muñiz, social media correspondent

==== Judges ====
- Sophie Sanfiorenzo
- Bryan Villarini
- Lumarie Landrau

=== Season 2 ===
- Dianne Ferrer, host
- Angie Rivers, backstage correspondent
- Zoe Muñiz, social media correspondent

==== Judges ====
- Sophie Sanfiorenzo
- Bryan Villarini
- Lumarie Landrau
