= Culture of New Orleans =

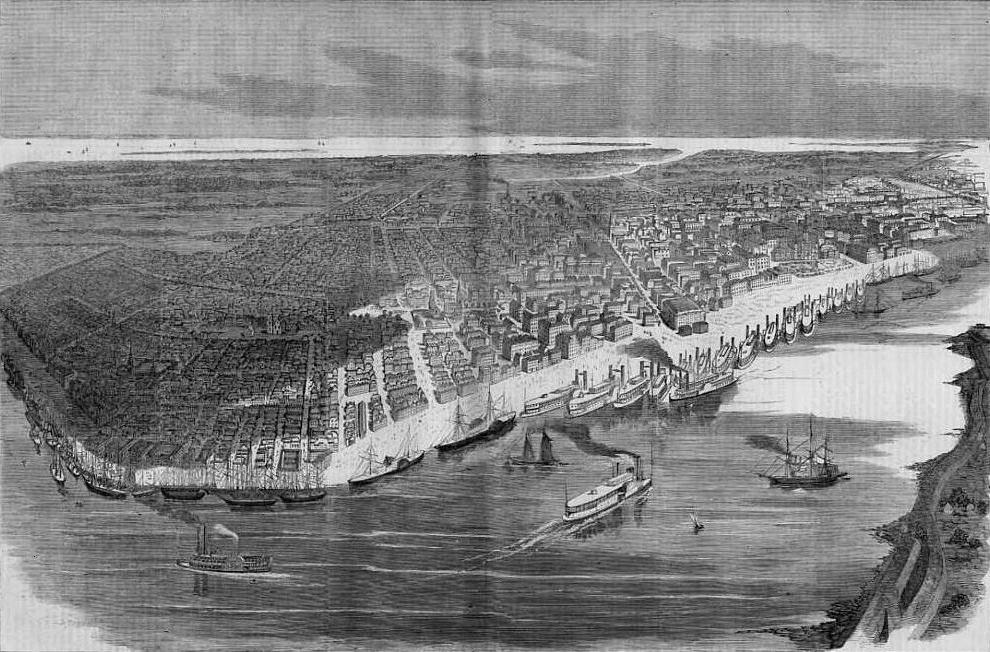
Bird's-eye view of New Orleans from 1862

The culture of New Orleans is unique among, and distinct from, that of other cities in the United States, including other Southern cities. New Orleans has been called the "northernmost Caribbean city" and "perhaps the most hedonistic city in the United States". Over the years, New Orleans has had a dominant influence on American and global culture.

In a locale once inhabited by Choctaw, Houma, and other native tribes, prominent cultural influences date to the French and Spanish colonial periods and the introduction of enslaved Africans in the 18th century.

== Language ==
American English, with significant variations, is the dominant language in New Orleans. French is used less in daily life than it was in the past. Francophones are, however, still present in the city and continue to keep the language alive, though they are less present than in other parts of southern Louisiana. However, its expressions and pronunciation have influenced various dialects in New Orleans, and it was still in significant use at the start of the 20th century. There are nine French immersion schools in the Greater New Orleans area and French is still spoken among elites in the city. The city has a long tradition of Hispanic immigrants dating back to the 18th century. Louisiana French, Spanish and Vietnamese are also heard in the city; Louisiana French speakers from southeast Louisiana entered the city during the 1970s–1980s oil boom, and a sizeable Vietnamese community established itself in the city in the last third of the 20th century.

The distinctive local accent is a Creole accent and not the stereotypical Southern accent so often misportrayed by film and television actors. It does, like earlier Southern Englishes, feature frequent deletion of post-vocalic "r". There are many theories of the origin of the accent, but it likely results from New Orleans' geographic isolation by water, and the fact that New Orleans was a major port of entry into the United States throughout the 19th century . Many of the immigrant groups who reside in Brooklyn also reside in New Orleans, with the largest groups being Irish, Germans, and Italians (with Sicilians predominating in the last group).

The prestige associated with being from New Orleans by many residents is likely a factor in the linguistic assimilation of the ethnically divergent population. This distinctive accent is dying out generation by generation in the city (but remains very strong in the surrounding parishes). As with many sociolinguistic artifacts, it is usually attested much more strongly by older members of the population. One subtype of the New Orleans accent is sometimes identified as Yat (from "Where y'at"). This word is not used as a generalized term for the New Orleans accent, and is generally reserved for the strongest varieties.

New Orleans is usually pronounced by locals as "noo-AW-lyenz", "noo-AW-linz", "noo-OR-linz", or "noo-OR-lyenz". The tendency among people around the world to say "noo-or-LEENZ" stems from the use of that pronunciation by singers and songwriters, who find it easy to rhyme. The pronunciation "NAW-linz" is likewise not generally used nor liked by locals but has been popularized by the tourist trade.

Local pronunciations: /nuːˈɔːljənz/, /nuːˈɔːliːnz/, /nuːˈɔːrliːnz/, /nuːˈɔːrliːənz/, /nuːˈɔːrlənz/

French: La Nouvelle-Orléans [la nuvɛl ɔʁle.ɑ̃]
Spanish: Nueva Orleans

Also notable are lexical items specific to the city, such as lagniappe /ˈlɒnjɒp/ meaning "a little something extra", makin' groceries for grocery shopping, or neutral ground for a street median.

== Music ==
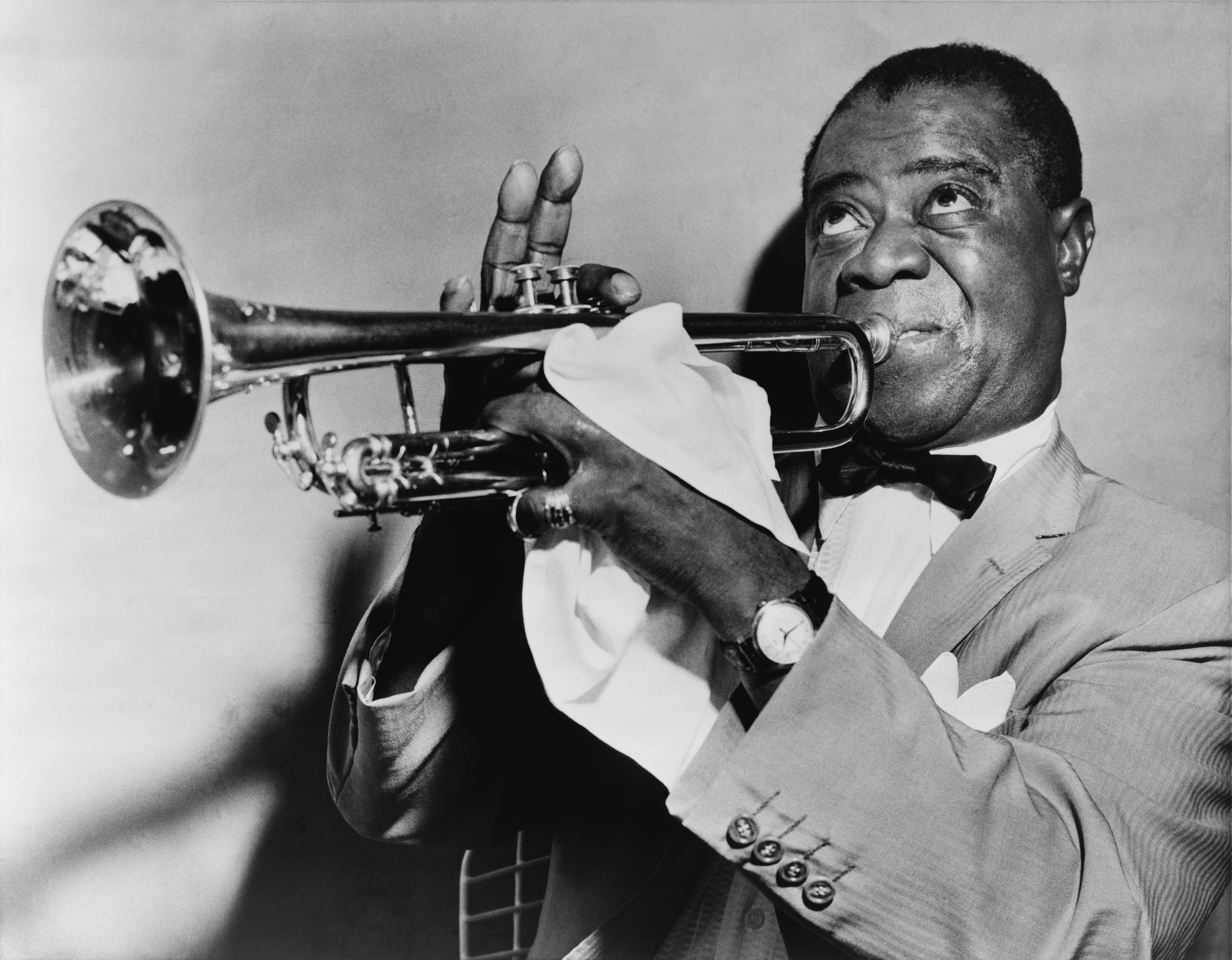
Louis Armstrong, famous jazz musician

New Orleans has always been a significant center for music with its intertwined European, Latin American, and African-American cultures. It was the site of the first opera house in the United States. The city engendered jazz with its brass bands. Decades later it was home to a distinctive brand of rhythm and blues that contributed greatly to the growth of rock and roll. In addition, the nearby countryside is the home of Creole music, Zydeco music, Jazz, and Delta blues.

== Crime ==
New Orleans has consistently experienced a high homicide rate during the previous two to three decades. Its average annual per-capita homicide rate (59 per 100,000) ranks highest of large cities in the country from 1990 to 2010 based on Bureau Of Justice Statistics from FBI Uniform Crime Reports. In 1994, 421 people were killed (85.8 per 100,000 people), a homicide rate which has not been matched by any major city to date. The homicide rate rose and fell year to year throughout the late 1990s, but the overall trend from 1994 to 1999 was a steady reduction in homicides.

Beginning in 2000, the homicide rate again increased. New Orleans had the highest homicide rate of any major American city in 2000 (42.1 per 100,000 people), 2001 (44.0 per 100,000), 2002 (53.1 per 100,000), 2003 (57.7 per 100,000) and 2004 (56.0 per 100,000). In 2005, there were 202 murders after 8 months a rate of 47 per 100,000, which was still a higher rate than any other major city's 12 month rate, but was not official because there was still 1 month left until the end of 3rd quarter crime data was to be released. In 2006, (70 per 100,000), 2007 (81 per 100,000), 2008 (64 per 100,000), 2009 (52 per 100,000), 2010 (51 per 100,000) and 2011 (58 per 100,000) it was more of the same as the previous years with New Orleans posting the highest per capta homicide rate of any major American city, or 12 years in a row annually until 2012, when the rate (53 per 100,000) was the 2nd highest among major U.S. cities. In 2004, 2006, 2007, 2008, 2009, and 2011 New Orleans' per capita homicide rate led cities with populations of 100,000 or more residents, which made it the nation's murder capital of the above-mentioned years with annual per capita homicide rates that were at least ten times the U.S. average in each of those years, according to Bureau of Justice Statistics from FBI Uniform Crime Reports, NOLA.com, and criminologist Dr. Peter Scharf.

After Hurricane Katrina (2005), news media attention focused on the reduced violent-crime rate following the exodus of many New Orleanians. That trend began to reverse itself as people returned to the city, although calculating the homicide rate remained difficult when no authoritative source could cite a total population figure.

In 2003, most victims in New Orleans were killed within three months of their last arrest. The homicide rate for the New Orleans metropolitan statistical area, which includes the suburbs, was 24.4 per 100,000 in 2002.

== News & entertainment media ==
The major newspaper is The Times-Picayune, publishing since 1837. It publishes six days a week and delivers to homes three days a week. The New Orleans Advocate, an edition of The Advocate of Baton Rouge, publishes and delivers to homes in the New Orleans area daily. Alternative weekly publications include The Louisiana Weekly and Gambit Weekly.

Greater New Orleans is well served by television and radio. The market is the 51st largest Designated Market Area (DMA) in the U.S., serving 633,140 homes and 0.559% of the U.S. Major television network affiliates serving the area include WWL 4 (CBS), WGNO 26 (ABC), WDSU 6 (NBC), WVUE 8 (FOX), WNOL 38 (WB), WUPL 54 (UPN), and WPXL 49 (ION). PBS stations include WYES 12 and WLAE 32. WHNO 20 also operates as an independent station in the area, providing mainly religious programming.

Radio stations serving Greater New Orleans include:

- Jazz: WWNO-FM (88.9), WWOZ-FM (90.7), WTUL-FM (91.5)
- Classical: WWNO-FM (89.9)
- Country: WNOE-FM (101.1)
- Contemporary: KLRZ-FM (100.3), WLMG-FM (101.9), WDVW-FM (92.3)
- Gospel/Christian: KHEV-FM (104.1), WYLD-AM (940), WBSN-FM (89.1), WLNO-AM (1060), WSHO-FM (800), WOPR-FM (94.9), WVOG-AM (600)
- Latino: KGLA-AM (1540), WFNO-FM (830)
- Oldies: WTIX-FM (94.3), WJSH-FM (104.7), WMTI-FM (106.1)
- Public: WRBH-FM (88.3), WWNO-FM (89.9)
- Rock: KKND-FM (106.7), WRNO-FM (99.5), WEZB-FM (97.1), WKBU-FM (95.7)
- Sports: WODT-AM (1280)
- Talk: WWL-AM (870), WWL-FM (105.3), WSMB-AM (1350), WIST-AM (690)
- Urban/Urban Contemporary: KKND-FM (102.9),KNOU-FM (104.5), WQUE-FM (93.3), WYLD-FM (98.5)

== Museums and other attractions ==
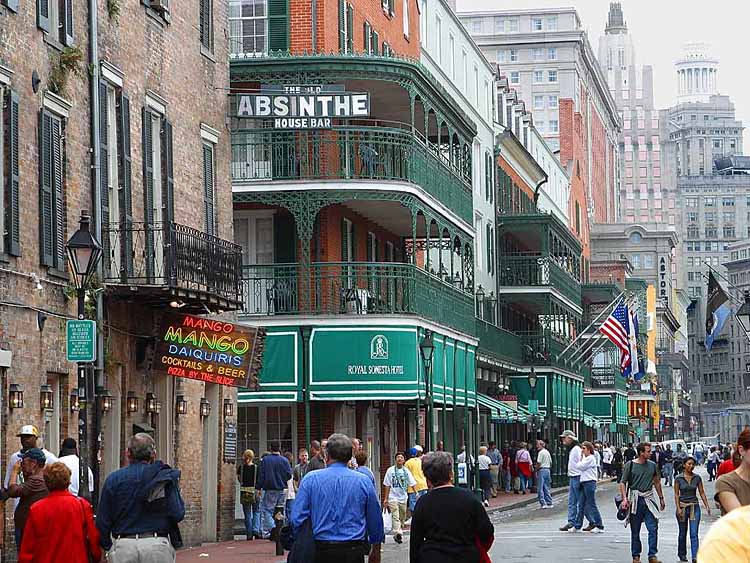
Bourbon Street, New Orleans, in 2003, looking towards Canal Street.

Greater New Orleans has many visitor attractions, including Uptown's St. Charles Avenue, home of Tulane University, Loyola University, many stately 19th-century mansions, and the St. Charles Streetcar Line.

The French Quarter (known locally as "the Quarters"), which dates from the French and Spanish eras, is probably the main tourist destination. The neighborhood contains many hotels, restaurants, and bars, most notably around Bourbon Street. Other attractions in the quarter include Jackson Square, St. Louis Cathedral, the French Market (including the Café du Monde, famous for café au lait and beignets), and Preservation Hall.

Also located near the French Quarter is the old New Orleans Mint, formerly a branch of the United States Mint (and the only mint of the Confederacy), which now operates as a museum. The National WWII Museum is relatively new, having opened in 2000 as the National D-Day Museum. The Natchez is an authentic steamboat with a calliope, which cruises the Mississippi River twice daily.

There are several locations of the Louisiana State Museum in the city, as well as the National Park Service's Jean Lafitte National Historical Park and Preserve, a multi-site development. The city has a number of additional historical museums and house museums, such as the Historic New Orleans Collection, the Hermann-Grima House, Gallier House, a pharmacy museum, and the nation's second-largest (after Richmond, Virginia) Confederate museum, Confederate Memorial Hall Museum.

Art museums in the city include the New Orleans Museum of Art (NOMA) in City Park and the Ogden Museum of Southern Art. Audubon Park and the Audubon Zoo are also located in the city of New Orleans, as is the Aquarium of the Americas. New Orleans is noted for its historic cemeteries. Two of the oldest and largest cemeteries are Saint Louis Cemetery and Metairie Cemetery.

Significant gardens include Longue Vue House and Gardens and the New Orleans Botanical Garden.

== Annual cultural events and fairs ==
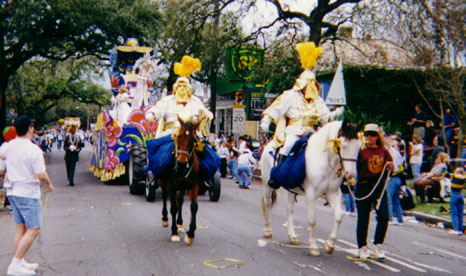
Mounted Krewe Officers in the Thoth Parade during Mardi Gras.

Greater New Orleans is home to numerous annual celebrations, including Mardi Gras, New Year's Eve celebrations, and the New Orleans Jazz & Heritage Festival. New Orleans' most famous celebration is its Carnival Season. The Carnival season is often known (especially by out-of-towners) by the name of the last and biggest day, Mardi Gras (literally, "Fat Tuesday"), held just before the beginning of the Catholic liturgical season of Lent. Mardi Gras celebrations include parades and floats; participants toss strings of cheap colorful beads and doubloons to the crowds. The Mardi Gras season is kicked off with the only parade allowed through the French Quarter (Vieux Carré, translated Old Square), a walking parade aptly named Krewe du Vieux.

The largest of the city's many musical festivals is the New Orleans Jazz & Heritage Festival. Commonly referred to simply as, "Jazz Fest", it is one of the largest music festivals in the nation, and features crowds coming from all over the world to experience music, food, arts, and crafts. Despite the name, it features not only jazz but a large variety of music, including both native Louisiana music and nationally-known popular music artists. The Essence Music Festival is another notable annual musical festival in the city.

Southern Decadence is a New Orleans-style celebration of the gay community. It is a six-day event that attracts over 160,000 locals and visitors. The annual event began in 1972 to empower the gay community of South Louisiana and has grown to be one of the largest gay events in the nation.

Hexfest is an annual gathering of spiritual workers from all over the world and is held in the first or second week of August each year in the French Quarter. This three-day event features authors, and various community elders sharing knowledge and workshops.

Voodoo Fest, not to be confused with the musical Voodoo Festival, is an annual event held every October 31 in the French Quarter by Voodoo Authentica. It features rituals, drumming and workshops to help educate people on voodoo.

Fèt Gede is an annual Festival of the Dead. It occurs on November 1 and is celebrated throughout the city. The Island of Salvation Botanica hosts an annual ritual honoring this Haitian Day of the Dead.

The Dia de Los Muertos procession is hosted by Krewe de Mayahuel every November 2. It honors the Mexican Day of the Dead. The procession begins in the Bywater, New Orleans neighborhood and ends at St. Roch Cemetery, New Orleans.

== Sports and recreation ==
Club	Sport	Founded	League	Venue
New Orleans Saints	Football	1967	NFL:NFC	Caesars Superdome
New Orleans Pelicans	Basketball	1988 (as Charlotte Hornets)	NBA: Western Conference	Smoothie King Center
New Orleans Gold	Rugby	2017	Major League Rugby	Archbishop Shaw Stadium

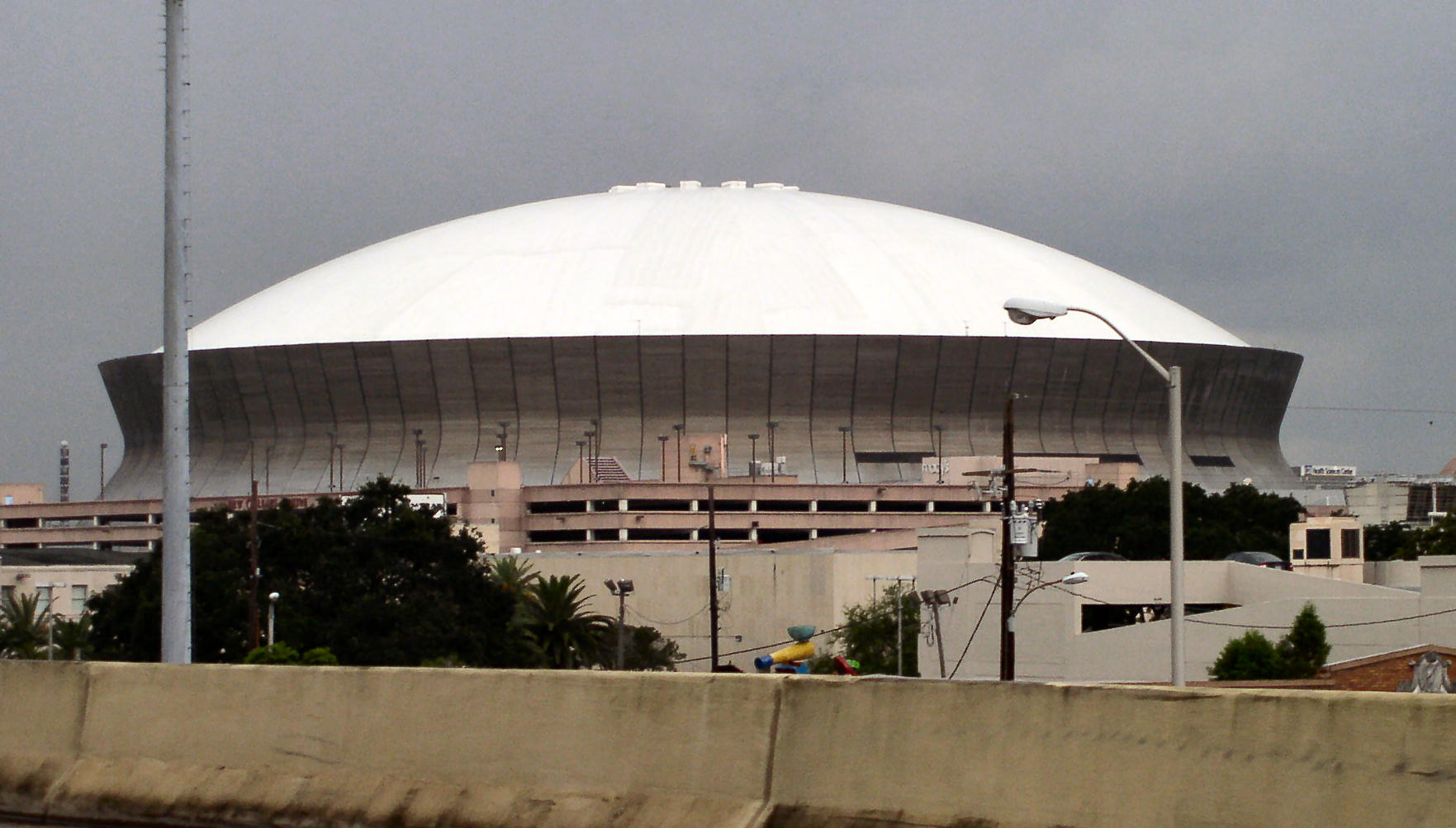
The Louisiana Superdome, home to the New Orleans Saints.

The city also hosts two college football bowl games annually: the New Orleans Bowl and the Sugar Bowl. The city also holds the Bayou Classic, which is an annual college football game between Grambling State University and Southern University. Nine Super Bowls have been contested in New Orleans.

Historically, many teams have been formerly located in the city, including the New Orleans Pelicans baseball team (1887–1959), the New Orleans Breakers of the United States Football League, the New Orleans Night of the Arena Football League (1991–1992), and the New Orleans Brass ice hockey team (1997–2003). Former basketball teams were the New Orleans Buccaneers (c. 1967–1970), and the New Orleans Jazz (1974–1980) which became the Utah Jazz.

New Orleans is also home to Southern Yacht Club, located at West End on the shore of Lake Pontchartrain. Established in 1849, it is the second oldest yacht club in the United States. The building was severely damaged, first by storm surge and then by fire, in the aftermath of Hurricane Katrina.

== Replicas of New Orleans ==
New Orleans Square, a replica of the French Quarter, was built in Disneyland in 1966, with buildings and landscaping meant to evoke 19th-century New Orleans. When it opened, Walt Disney had then-New Orleans mayor Victor H. Schiro made honorary mayor of New Orleans Square. Schiro, in turn, made Disney an honorary citizen of the real New Orleans.

== Food in New Orleans ==
New Orleans is world-famous for its food. The indigenous cuisine is distinctive and influential, developing from centuries of amalgamation of local Creole, Cajun, and French cuisines. Local ingredients are combined with French, Spanish, Italian, African, Native American, and a hint of Cuban food traditions.

Unique specialties include

- beignets, square-shaped fried pastries known as "French doughnuts" (served with coffee and chicory, known as café au lait);
- po' boy and Italian muffuletta sandwiches;
- Gulf oysters on the half-shell, boiled crawfish, and other seafood;
- étouffée, jambalaya, gumbo, and other Creole dishes;
- red beans and rice (Louis Armstrong often signed his letters, "Red beans and ricely yours").
