= WNJX-TV =

Television station in Mayagüez, Puerto Rico

Satellite of WKAQ-TV and WAPA-TV, San Juan, Puerto Rico
- Mayagüez; Puerto Rico
- Channels: Digital: 31 (UHF); Virtual: 2, 4
- Branding: WAPA (general); NotiCentro (newscasts); WAPA Deportes (4.2); Telenoticias (DT4 newscasts); Punto 2 (on DT5)

Programming
- Affiliations: 2.12: Telemundo; 2.22: Punto 2; 4.1: WAPA-TV; 4.2: WAPA Deportes; 4.3: Wapa 3

Ownership
- Owner: WAPA Media Group; (Televicentro of Puerto Rico, LLC)
- Operator: DT4: Telemundo Station Group (NBCUniversal) via TBA
- Sister stations: WAPA-TV, WTIN-TV, WKAQ, WKAQ-FM, WYEL

History
- First air date: April 27, 1970
- Former call signs: WUHM-TV (1970–1976); W22AB (1976–1983); WQRD (1983–1986)
- Former channel numbers: Analog: 22 (UHF, 1970–2009); Digital: 23 (UHF, 2003–2018)
- Former affiliations: Repeater for WKAQ-TV (1970–1986); Repeater for WLII-DT (1986–1994); Repeater for WSJU-TV (1991–1995); Repeater for WSTE-DT (1995–1999)

Technical information
- Licensing authority: FCC
- Facility ID: 73336
- ERP: 160 kW (STA); 476 kW; 960 kW (CP)
- HAAT: 668.5 m (2,193 ft) (STA); 703 m (2,306 ft) (CP)
- Transmitter coordinates: 18°8′51.6″N 66°58′57.1″W

Links
- Public license information: Public file; LMS
- Website: www.wapa.tv; www.telemundopr.com

WNJX-TV (channel 4) is a Spanish-language independent television station in Mayagüez, Puerto Rico. It is a full-time satellite of San Juan–based WAPA-TV (channel 4), owned by WAPA Media Group. WNJX-TV's transmitter is located at Monte del Estado in Maricao, while its parent station maintains studios on Avenida Luis Vigoreaux in Guaynabo.

WNJX-TV's fourth digital subchannel operates as a full-time satellite of Telemundo owned-and-operated station WKAQ-TV (channel 2) under a time brokerage agreement with NBCUniversal's Telemundo Station Group. Branded on-air as Telemundo West, this subchannel is mapped to virtual channel 2.12 rather than 4.4. WNJX-DT4's parent station maintains studios on Avenida Roosevelt in San Juan.

== Technical information ==
=== Subchannels ===
The station's digital signal is multiplexed:

Subchannels of WNJX-TV
Channel	Res.	Short name	Programming
4.1	720p	WNJX-DT	WAPA-TV
4.2	720p	WNJX-D2	WAPA Deportes
4.3	480i	WNJX-D3	WAPA 3
2.12	720p	WKAQ-DT	Telemundo
2.22	480i	WKAQ .2	Punto 2

Simulcast of subchannels of another station

=== Analog-to-digital conversion ===
WNJX-TV shut down its analog signal over UHF channel 22, on June 12, 2009, the official date on which full-power television stations in the United States transitioned from analog to digital broadcasts under federal mandate. The station's digital signal remained on its pre-transition UHF channel 23. Through the use of PSIP, digital television receivers display the station's virtual channel at VHF channel 4.
