= Giovanna Huyke =

Puerto Rican chef (born 1956)

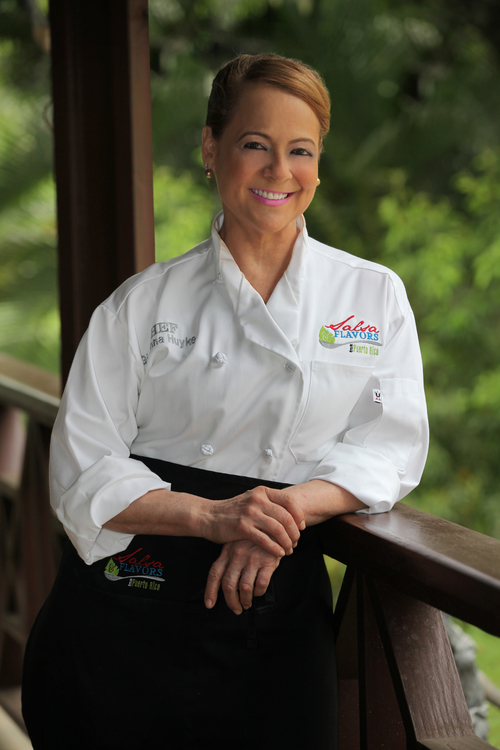
- Born: Giovanna Maria Huyke-Souffront; 21 December 1956 (age 69); San Juan, Puerto Rico
- Education: Tulane University (Dramatic Arts)
- Occupation: Chef
- Years active: 67
- Website: http://giovannahuyke.com/

Giovanna Huyke-Souffront (born 21 December 1956), known as Giovanna Huyke and "Chef Giovanna", is a Puerto Rican celebrity chef and an international culinary leader often referred to as the “Julia Child of Puerto Rico."

== Early life and education ==
Huyke was born in San Juan, Puerto Rico on 21 December 1956. Her parents are Alice Hyuke (née Souffront), a celebrated cooking teacher in Puerto Rico for over 30 years, and Hector Huyke-Colon, a civil engineer and architect in Puerto Rico. Huyke began her career in theater, obtaining a bachelor's degree in Dramatic Arts at Tulane University. While in New Orleans, she worked in Paul Prudehomme’s Louisiana Kitchen and as an assistant to Lee Barnes, and then moved on to New York City to work with renowned chef Felipe Rojas Lombardi. Huyke then returned to Puerto Rico and worked at the Caribe Hilton for one year, after which she founded Amadeus in San Juan, where she pioneered “nouvelle criollo”, which consists of native ingredients and recipes with classic techniques. She was also the chef at Ali-Oli, founded by one of her mentors, Alfredo Ayala. Huyke founded the restaurants Don Juan in the El San Juan Hotel and Giovanna's Café.

== Career ==
Over the later part of her 40+ year cooking history, Giovanna Huyke has been credited with leading a transformation of Puerto Rican cuisine by emphasizing local ingredients along with traditional cooking methods and by constructing lighter and healthier Puerto Rican dishes, without sacrificing traditional Puerto Rican flavor.

Huyke competed in Food Network's TV show "Beat Bobby Flay. She has also been featured on Good Morning America, Pierre Franney’s Cooking in America, AARP VIVA, Burt Wolf's Travels and Traditions, and Univision’s Despierta. Her work has been published in The New York Times, Bon Appetit, Food and Wine, Shape en Español, Vanidades and Cristina. She has additionally published six cookbooks and 20 recipe booklets showcasing her culinary creations.

Huyke is currently serving as a global culinary ambassador for Puerto Rican cooking by consulting for various restaurant projects, serving as menu-designer and composer, speaking at various cooking events, and serving as judge at various Puerto Rican culinary events, including Saborea 2016. She was most recently the Executive Chef at Mio Restaurant in Washington, DC, which has been called the “Embassy of Latin America in DC” by Washingtonian Magazine. Huyke was critiqued by Washington Post food critic Tom Sietsema, calling one of her specialties a “last meal request” and leading Mio to be listed in the Washington Post “Top Forty Fall Dining Guide” restaurant list and the Washingtonian Magazine's “Top 100 Restaurants”.

== Awards / Accomplishments ==
- Host of a daily cooking show called Giovanna's Kitchen (“La Cocina de Giovanna”), which was broadcast uninterrupted for over 23 years in Puerto Rico
- Host of a weekly cooking show called En Casa con Giovanna, which is referenced in the 2013 book Eating Puerto Rico: A History of Food, Culture and Identity
- Host of a dinner party cooking show called Giovanna Primetime
- Walmart/Amigo spokesperson, writing recipes and cooking techniques and tips for the in-store cooking magazine
- Procter & Gamble spokesperson in Puerto Rico for “Brand Saver” coupon, cooking and healthy living magazine and P&G's Brand Saver web portal called P&G Every Day
- Served as culinary ambassador from Puerto Rico to Japan, sponsored by the Puerto Rican tourism bureau
- Weekly writer for Miami Herald/el Nuevo Herald and El Nuevo Dia

== TV shows ==
Giovanna Huyke's TV shows have included:

- La Cocina de Giovanna, which was broadcast uninterrupted for over 23 years in Puerto Rico
- At home with Giovanna, showcasing recipes, arts, crafts and home decorating ideas
- Giovanna Primetime, a dinner party cooking show

== Restaurants ==
- La Fábrica Central Restaurant (Central Square Cambridge, Ma) 2018-Current
- K Paul's Louisiana Kitchen (New Orleans, LA) - Chef Paul Prudehomme's landmark restaurant
- (New Orleans, LA) - Chef Giovanna served as an assistant to one of the best-known culinarians in New Orleans
- Dean and Deluca Gourmet Food Store (New York City) - Chef Giovanna worked with Renowned Peruvian Chef Felipe Rojas as he was the founding chef of Dean and Deluca, and whose other experience included serving as James Beard's assistant at the James Beard Cooking School, serving as the Chef/Owner of The Ballroom restaurant in Chelsea and being named America's Bicentennial chef in 1976.
- ' (San Juan, Puerto Rico) - Chef Giovanna began to pioneer a new method of cooking consisting of native ingredients and recipes with classic techniques.
- Ali-Oli (San Juan, Puerto Rico) - founded by one of Chef Giovanna's mentors, Alfredo Ayala
- Don Juan Restaurant at the El San Juan Hotel and Casino (San Juan, Puerto Rico) - The first restaurant Chef Giovanna founded
- Giovanna's Cafe (San Juan, Puerto Rico) - Chef Giovanna's second restaurant

== Books ==
- A tu Salud
- Cocina con Giovanna Celebraciones
- Entremeses-Alice and Giovanna Huyke
- La Cocina De Giovanna #1
- La Cocina De Giovanna #2
- La Cocina De Giovanna #3
- La Cocina De Giovanna #4
- La Cocina De Giovanna #5
- La Cocina De Giovanna #6
- La Cocina De Giovanna #7
- La Cocina De Giovanna #8
- La Cocina De Giovanna #9
- La Cocina De Giovanna #10
- La Cocina De Giovanna #11
- La Cocina De Giovanna #12
- La Cocina De Giovanna #13
- La Cocina De Giovanna #14
- La Cocina De Giovanna #15
- La Cocina De Giovanna #16
- La Cocina De Giovanna Huyke
- La Cocina De Giovanna-Primera Temporada
- La Cocina Puertorriquena De Hoy Por Giovanna Huyke
- Postres Variados-Alice and Giovanna Huyke
- Puerto Rico Does it Better-The Recipe Book
