= James Gallier Jr. =

American architect

- Born: September 25, 1827; Huntingdon, England
- Died: May 16, 1868 (aged 40); New Orleans, Louisiana, US
- Occupation: Architect
- Buildings: Gallier House, French Opera House, The Third Christ Church

James Gallier Jr. (September 25, 1827 – May 16, 1868) was an architect in New Orleans, Louisiana during the mid-19th century. He was born to Elizabeth Tyler and James Gallier Sr. in Huntingdon, England. As a boy, he was educated at St. Thomas's Hall, a private academy in Flushing, Long Island, until beginning college at the University of North Carolina at Chapel Hill.

In 1853, he married Josephine Aglaé Villavaso of St. Bernard Parish, Louisiana. The couple had four daughters.

During the Civil War, James Gallier Jr. served as a private in Captain Greenleaf's Company (Orleans Light Horse Louisiana Cavalry), though it is unknown if he saw any combat. A few years after the war, he died in his home. The cause of death is not listed on his death certificate. He was buried in St. Louis Cemetery No. 3 in what was originally designed as a monument to his father.

== Career ==
In 1849, James Gallier Sr., a famed architect in his own right, turned his business over to Gallier Jr., setting up a partnership with two of his former associates: John Turpin and Richard Esterbrook. Their firm became known as Gallier, Turpin & Co. until Turpin left in 1858. The firm was then known as Gallier & Esterbrook.

== Buildings by Gallier, Turpin & Co. ==
- New Orleans and Carrolton railroad terminal (1852), South Carrolton and St. Charles Avenue. Demolished in 1891.
- Store and warehouse for Leeds Iron Foundry (1852, now Preservation Resource Center), Tchoupitoulas Street.
- Store for Sidney Story (1853), 610-612 Canal Street. Demolished.
- House for James Robb (1855), 1220 Washington Avenue. Demolished
- Double store for Robert Heath (1855), St. Charles Avenue and Gravier Street.
- Mechanics Institute (1857), Dryads Street. Demolished.
- Bank of New Orleans (1857), 321 St. Charles Avenue. Demolished.
- House for Lavina Dabney (1857), 2265 St. Charles Avenue.

== Buildings by Gallier & Esterbrook ==
- French Opera House (1859) on Bourbon and Toulouse Streets. Burned down in 1919.
- Boisblanc-Cantonnet House (1860), 334 North Rampart Street. Demolished.
- House for Henry W. Conner (1860), 130 South Rampart Street. Demolished.
- House for Florence A. Luling (1865), 1436 Leda Street. Converted to the Louisiana Jockey Club (1871-1905).
- Bank of America Building (1866), 111 Exchange Place.
- Gatehouse (and gates) for the Fairgrounds Race Track (1866), Gentilly Boulevard.

== Other significant works ==
- The Third Christ Church Cathedral (1846), Canal Street. No longer exists.
- Gallier House (1859), 1132 Royal Street.
