= Lee Barnes (cook) =

New Orleans chef and cooking teacher (1951-1992)

- Born: 1951; Natchez, Mississippi
- Died: November 3, 1992 (aged 40–41)
- Education: Newcomb College; Le Cordon Bleu
- Occupation: Cook

Lee Barnes (1951 – November 3, 1992) was an American chef, cookbook author, and cooking teacher in New Orleans, Louisiana during the 1970s and 1980s. She founded the Lee Barnes Cooking School and Gourmet Shop in 1974, and participated in many culinary events and demonstrations in and around New Orleans, as well as in Florida, New York, Washington D.C., France, and Thailand.

== Early life ==
Lee Barnes was born in Natchez, Mississippi. After graduating from Newcomb College in 1973, Barnes enrolled at Le Cordon Bleu in Paris, where she received a degree in culinary arts.

== Career ==
After returning to New Orleans in 1974, Barnes opened the Lee Barnes Cooking School in Uptown New Orleans. The school, which remained in operation until 1989, has been noted as the first true culinary school in New Orleans and one of the first in Louisiana. Barnes' cooking school attracted a wide audience because unlike many cooking schools at the time, it was open to both genders and people of all races, classes and ages. Her first students were children and through her career she continued teaching cooking to adults and children. During the fifteen years that her school was operational she sponsored local and international cooks in a kind of exchange, where they learned New Orleans cooking and the New Orleans community learned international cuisine.

While running the school, she published The Lee Barnes Cooking School Cookbook in 1977, and the New Orleans Jazz and Heritage Cookbook alongside Lorraine Landry in 1984. Barnes produced a radio show for chef Paul Prudhomme She also taught vocational cooking at Delgado Community College.

== Personal life ==
Barnes married Earl William Harter Jr. in 1976 and they had three children. The cooking school remained in operation until 1989, after which Barnes moved to Alexandria, Virginia. Barnes was a resident of Alexandria, Virginia when she died in 1992 of a brain tumor.

== See also ==
- Culture of New Orleans
