= Hermann–Grima House =

Historic house in Louisiana, United States

- U.S. National Register of Historic Places
- U.S. National Historic Landmark
- U.S. National Historic Landmark District – Contributing property
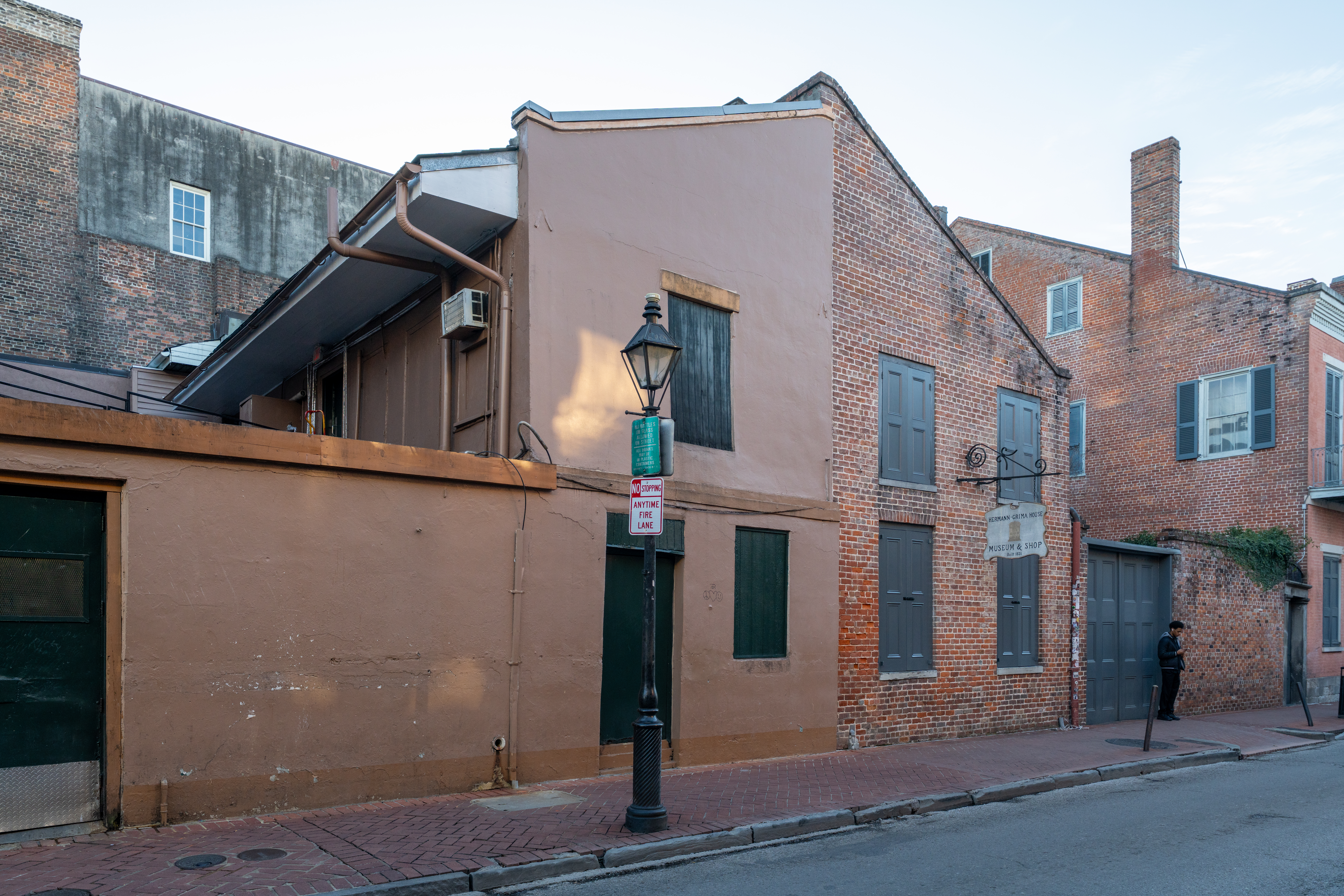

- Location within East New Orleans Location within Louisiana Location within the United States
- Location: 818–820 St. Louis St., New Orleans, Louisiana
- Coordinates: 29°57′25.65″N 90°4′3.83″W
- Built: 1831
- Part of: Vieux Carre Historic District (ID66000377)
- NRHP reference No.: 71000359

Significant dates
- Added to NRHP: August 19, 1971
- Designated NHL: May 30, 1974
- Designated NHLDCP: December 21, 1965

The Hermann–Grima House is a historic house museum in the French Quarter of New Orleans, Louisiana, United States. The meticulously restored home reflects 19th century New Orleans. It is a Federal-style mansion with courtyard garden, built in 1831. It has the only extant horse stable and 1830s open-hearth kitchen in the French Quarter.

The house has been restored to its original splendor through archaeological studies and careful review of the building contract and inventories. The house is recognized as one of the earliest examples of American architecture in the French Quarter. The restoration accurately depicts the gracious lifestyle of a prosperous Creole family. Approximately one-half of the collection can be sourced to original families.

The Christian Woman's Exchange (now The Woman's Exchange), a local non-profit organization, purchased the property in the 1920s and ran it as a boarding house for single women until 1975. It was restored and reopened as a museum in 1975, and The Woman's Exchange still owns and operates the building today. It was declared a National Historic Landmark in 1974.

== Architecture ==
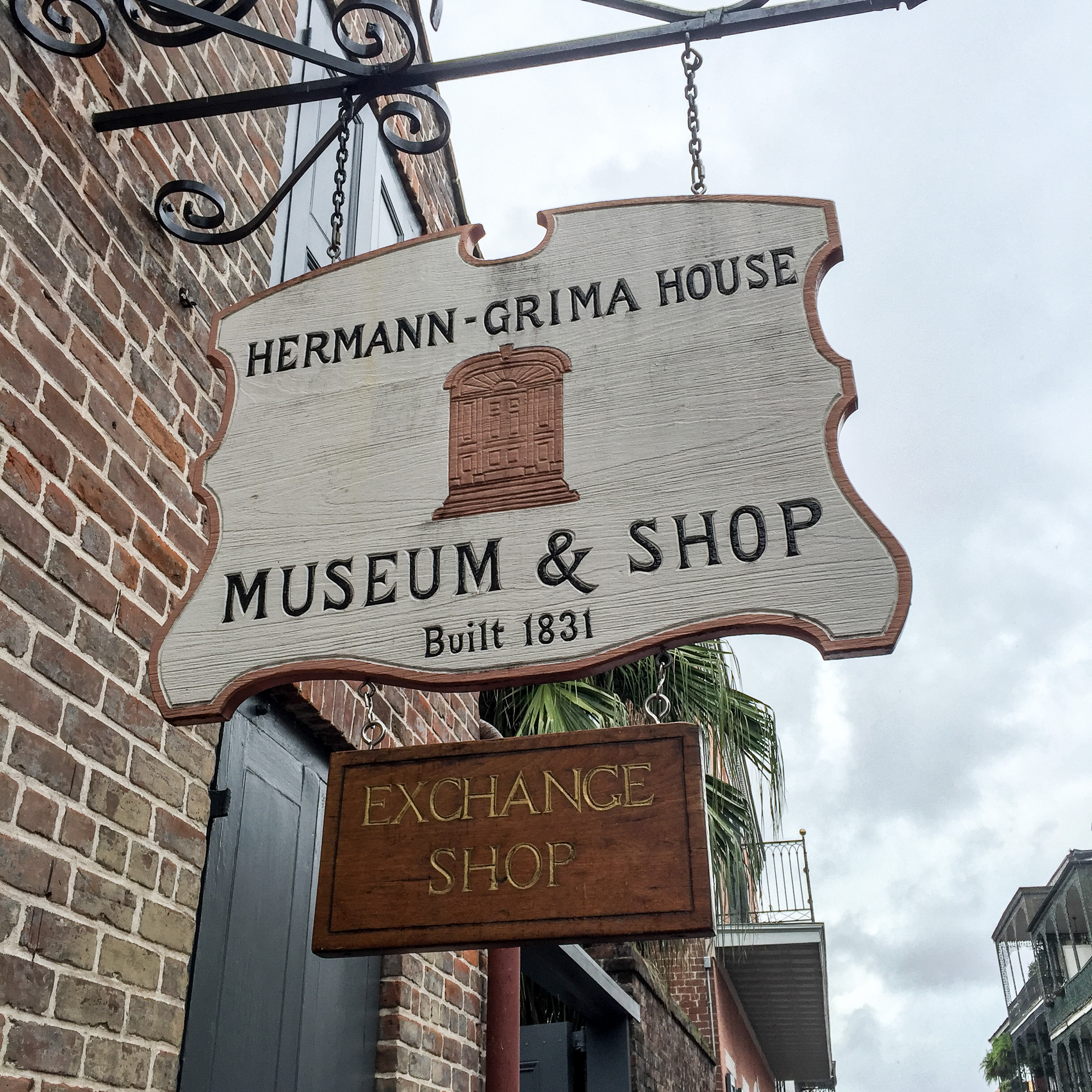
Entrance sign

William Brand designed and built the house in the Federal or Georgian style. This was not a commonly used style in early 19th-century New Orleans. It features a symmetrical facade, an ornate doorway, and a wide central hall, but it is not purely Federal.

Brand took the basic form of a Federal-style house and added several cabinets, balconies, and galleries. The balconies and galleries are more typical of French Louisiana style architecture and were an adaptation necessary because of the warm climate. The slave quarters were built in the characteristic New Orleans style. There are no interior hallways; the balconies connect the rooms.

== Furniture styles ==
There are four major styles of furniture in The Hermann–Grima House. Because the home was a private residence from approximately 1831 to 1924 there are several furniture styles that are appropriate to the museum's interpretation of the history of the house. The majority of the collection is generally classified as American Empire and early Victorian with many nice examples of more specific styles under both classifications.

=== American/Late Empire ===
American Empire style furniture was heavily influenced by the Neo-classical style of French Empire style furniture with comparatively straight lines and motifs evoking Greece and Rome. The difference in the American Empire Style can be found in the characteristic heavier feel than French Empire. The style was very fashionable between 1830 and 1850 and was still completely acceptable as solid and conservative well after that time. The Hermann–Grima House collection houses a substantial amount of furniture classified under this style.

=== Restoration ===
Restoration style is a sub-classification of the Empire Style. The reference is to the restoration of Louis XVIII to the throne of France after the defeat of Napoleon. It is also influenced by the French Empire style. It resembles Greek and Roman models, but the lines show more pronounced curve. This style was interpreted by United States cabinetmakers such as Francois Seignouret. Example of this style can be seen throughout the Hermann–Grima House, most notably in the dining room.

=== Interior ===
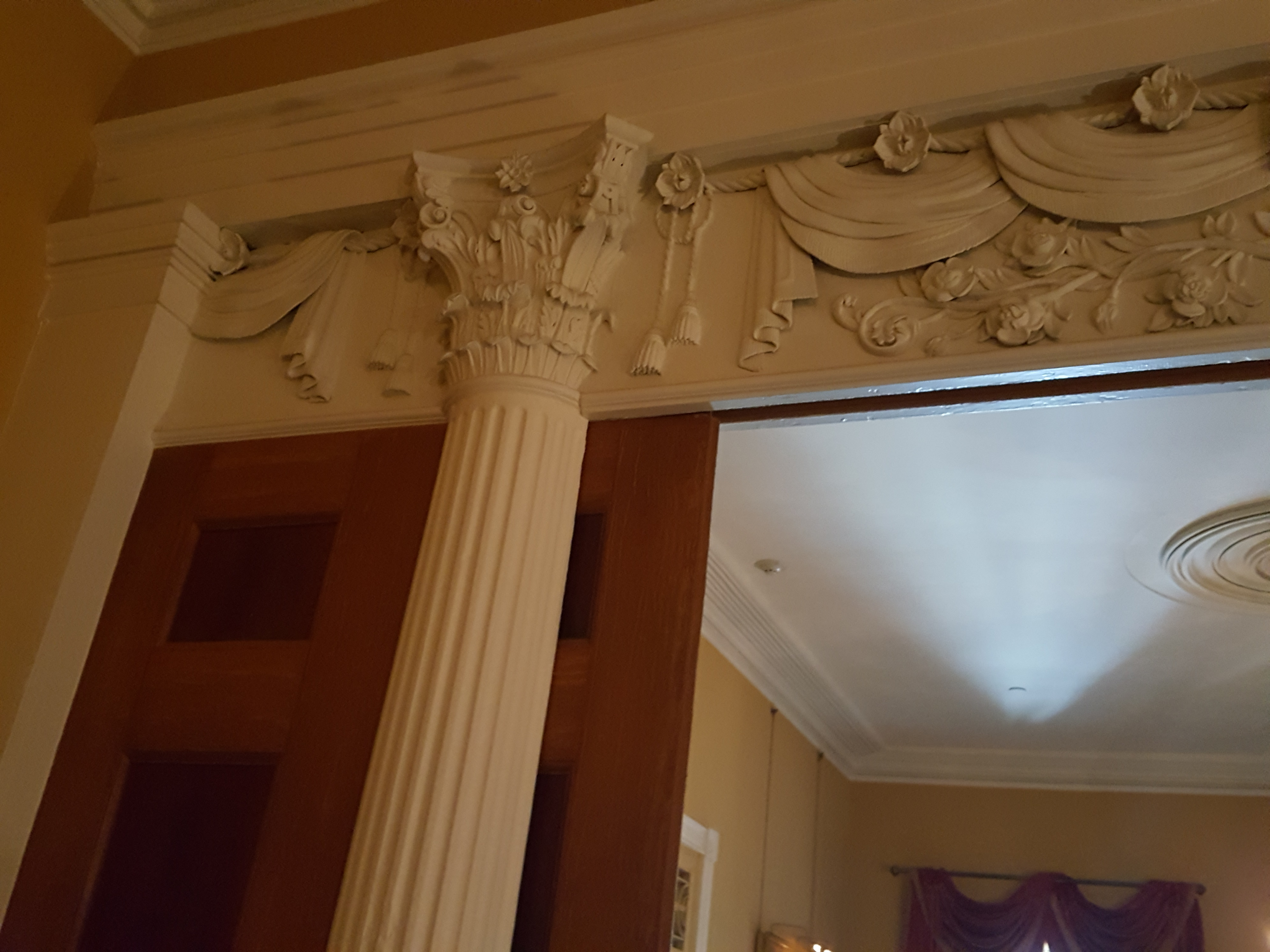
Detail of the pillar

=== Pillar and scroll ===
This early Victorian style heavily influenced American cabinetmakers such as Joseph Meeks. Meeks has a furniture outlet in New Orleans on Chartres Street, but his main office was in New York. The characteristics of this style are also based on Greek and Roman models but reflect simple construction and flat one-dimensional surfaces with pillars and scrolls supporting the pieces. They are machine-made or partially machine-made. There are several fine examples of this style of furniture in the Hermann–Grima House collection.

=== Rococo Revival ===
The Rococo Revival style became fashionable from roughly 1845 to 1860. Classicism gave way to Romanticism and a fascination with the past became the basis for an entire range of "Revival Styles". The most popular was the French Revival Style that recalled the days of Louis XV and Madame de Pompadour - the Rococo Revival style. The style was popularized in the United States by cabinetmakers such as Henry Belter and Prudent Mallard. The furniture emphasizes C-scrolls and S-scrolls with a light, feminine feel. Decorative carvings of fruit, flower and shell motifs were popular. The Hermann–Grima House has a beautiful Rococo Revival bedroom set and many other fine examples of this style of furniture.

== Families ==
=== Hermann family ===
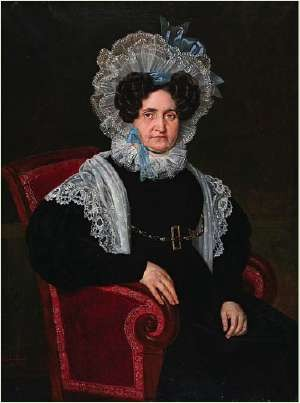
Mrs. Marie Emeranthe Becnel Brou Hermann

Samuel Hermann was born in 1777 in Rödelheim, Germany. He immigrated to Louisiana in 1804 and settled on the German Coast about twenty miles up river from New Orleans. His wife, Marie Emeranthe Becnel, was born in St. John the Baptist Parish in 1776. Samuel and Emeranthe were married in 1806 in St. John the Baptist Church. The Hermanns had four children. They were Samuel, Jr., Louis Florian, Lucien, and Marie Virginie. Samuel worked as an agent and broker for plantation owners and New Orleans merchants. They moved to New Orleans in 1813 and lived in various houses in the French Quarter. Samuel continued to act as a broker and expanded his business into mortgages, stocks and real estate.

The family purchased a lot on St. Louis Street in 1831 and Samuel hired architect, William Brand, to build a new residence. Mr. Brand built a Federal style house for the family. The house is now the Hermann–Grima Historic House Museum. In 1837, the English cotton market crashed, instituting a worldwide financial panic. Mr. Hermann's fortune was eventually lost due to the crash and he sold the home to Felix Grima.

The Hermann family continued to live in the French Quarter with their daughter and her family. Samuel Hermann died in 1851 and Emeranthe Hermann died in 1853. They are both buried in St. Louis Cemetery No.2.

=== Grima family ===
Felix Grima was the youngest child of Albert Xavier Grima, a native of Malta, and his wife, Marie Anne Filiosa, a native of New Orleans. Felix was born in New Orleans in 1798. He graduated from the college d'Orleans, a creole school that emphasized the classics, then studied law with his brother-in-law. His wife was Marie Sophie Adelaide Montegut who was born in 1811. He and his wife lived on the corner of Bourbon and Toulouse, the future site of the French Opera House. Five of their children were born in the house and four more were born after they moved into the house at 820 St. Louis Street.

They moved into the former Hermann home in 1844 with Felix's unmarried sister and widowed mother. They were a well-read, cultured family. The museum now owns over two thousand books that belonged to the family. They were involved in the city's social life as well as the city's religious life. Mrs. Grima sponsored a St. Louis Cathedral sewing group and their youngest daughter sang in the choirs at St. Louis Cathedral and St. Augustine Church. The Grima family lived in the house at 820 St. Louis until 1921 when the last Grima living in the house sold it and moved to uptown New Orleans.

== The Christian Woman's Exchange ==
The Christian Woman's Exchange was founded in New Orleans in 1881 by Margaret W. Bartlett. Its original purpose was to provide a place where needy women could sell homemade products or family heirlooms. Throughout its history, the Christian Woman's Exchange has been financially supported by prominent New Orleans women including, Mrs. Ira A. Richardson, Caroline S. Tilton, Mrs. Charles L. Howard, and M.L. Whitney. It was later renamed the Woman's Exchange, and is part of a larger movement.

In 1887, the Exchange acquired the Edwards House, on the corner of Camp and South Streets, which held a shop, a library, a lunchroom, and a rooming house for women. In 1924, the Exchange purchased the Hermann–Grima House at 820 St. Louis Street. As stated above, the building served as a rooming house for women until 1975, when it was converted to a house museum. In 1996, the Woman's Exchange became the steward of the Gallier House, a house museum, after acquiring it from Tulane University.

The organization's name change, omitting the word "Christian", was relatively recent–late 20th century or early 21st century.

== See also ==
- Gallier House, a house museum on Royal Street acquired by the Woman's Exchange in 1996
- List of National Historic Landmarks in Louisiana
- National Register of Historic Places listings in Orleans Parish, Louisiana
