= WYEL =

Radio station in Mayagüez, Puerto Rico

Mayagüez, Puerto Rico; Puerto Rico
- Frequency: 600 kHz
- Branding: WYEL AM 600

Programming
- Language: Spanish
- Format: Talk radio
- Affiliations: WKAQ

Ownership
- Owner: WAPA Media Group; (WLII/WSUR License Partnership, G.P.)
- Sister stations: WAPA-TV, WTIN-TV, WNJX-TV, WKAQ, WUKQ, WKAQ-FM

History
- First air date: July 16, 1948; 77 years ago
- Former call signs: WAEL (1948–2007)

Technical information
- Licensing authority: FCC
- Facility ID: 70686
- Class: B
- ERP: 5,000 watts
- Transmitter coordinates: 18°10′39.00″N 67°10′15.00″W

Links
- Public license information: Public file; LMS
- Website: www.wyelam600.com

WYEL (600 AM) is a radio station broadcasting a Spanish language talk radio format, repeating San Juan station WKAQ. It is licensed to Mayagüez, Puerto Rico, and is owned by WAPA Media Group.

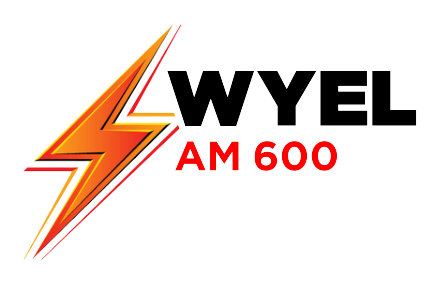
Previous logo
