= Reynold Alexander =

Puerto Rican magician

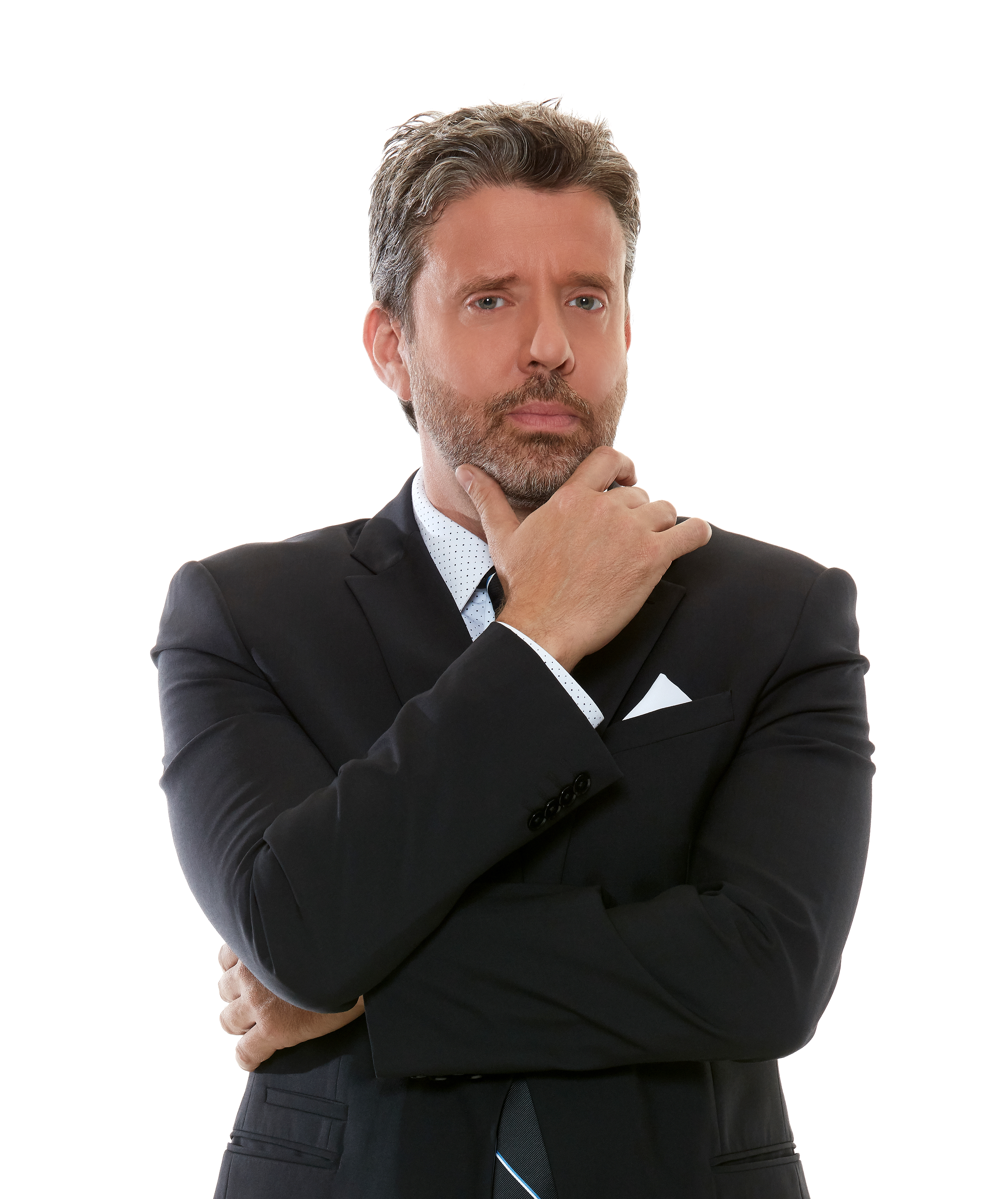
- Born: Reynold Sebelén Medina; June 16, 1977 (age 47); San Juan, Puerto Rico
- Occupation: Illusionist
- Years active: 1998-present
- Website: https://www.reynoldalexander.com

Reynold Sebelén Medina is a Puerto Rican magician and illusionist (born June 16, 1977) known professionally as Reynold Alexander.

== Early life ==
He is the son of businessman Roberto Sebelén and housewife Lucy Medina, Reynold is the youngest of four siblings. As a baby, his parents moved to the Dominican Republic and later at twelve years old, he moved back to Puerto Rico with his mother after his parents divorced.

At age 13, he became a member of the Society of Young Magicians (S.Y.M.). Reynold became president of the Puerto Rican chapter, and was two-time First Place winner for “Stage Magic”. He was later initiated into Society of American Magicians (S.A.M).

== Career ==
Reynold's professional career started in 1998 at age 20, when he adopted “Alexander” as a stage name. His first show was at Fiji's, a small long-gone local bar in Condado, Puerto Rico.

In 2005, Reynold Alexander made the Capitol Building of Puerto Rico, a century-old structure located at the entrance of Old San Juan, disappear in front of a live audience. This event was transmitted live on the national television show Qué Suerte with host Héctor Marcano.

Alexander, a Houdini fan, recreated his famously dangerous Chinese Water Torture Cell Escape in 2006. Reynold, handcuffed, was submerged upside down into a narrow tank containing 250 gallons of water and locked with six heavy duty padlocks.

In 2006, Alexander briefly held the fastest suspended straitjacket escape Guinness World Record. While hoisted upside down fifty feet above the ground by his ankles with a burning rope. He had two minutes to escape from the regulation straitjacket before the fire burned through. He escaped in 1 minute and 45 secs. A few months later that record was broken by an English escape artist.

Alexander caught a bullet shot by a Magnum .357 revolver with his teeth. The bullet and casing were marked by members of the audience before it was fired for later verification. Reynold has performed the bullet catch a handful of times. At least twelve magicians have died performing this stunt.

Alexander repeatedly performed at The Magic Castle in Hollywood.

In 2014, Alexander headlined his own show entitled “Magia” at the Debbie Reynolds Theater in Las Vegas, Nevada.

Alexander collaborated with David Copperfield for a special act for his show in Las Vegas at the MGM Grand Hotel and Casino.

=== Charity work ===
Alexander performed at Grandes Ilusiones charity event in Murcia, Spain to raise money for children with autism. He has been involved with San Jorge Hospital in San Juan, Puerto Rico where he has performed for the children and their parents.

=== TV and media ===
His early TV life started with the Show Qué Suerte! with host Héctor Marcano. There he did stunts including escaping from a packing crate while suspended from a helicopter, driving a car while blindfolded and making the Puerto Rico's Capital Building disappear. Since then Reynold has appeared in all major Puerto Rico TV shows and was featured in the Dominican Republic, Spain and the United States. Magia Extrema was the name of his own two-hour TV special aired in 2012 in WAPA and WAPA América. Magia Extrema was the highest rated show in that time slot.

Alexander has done TV commercials for Plaza las Américas, Casino Metro, Puerto Rico Tourism Company and Mall of San Juan. He made a DVD (currently unavailable) featuring his Sobrevive la Magia show tour from 2006.

=== Residency ===
From 2010 to 2017, Alexander was the resident magician with his own show at the Casablanca Theater at the Conquistador Resort in Fajardo, Puerto Rico. Unfortunately, the hotel was destroyed by Hurricane María in 2017. He performs at the Wyndham Rio Mar in Puerto Rico.

== See also ==
- List of Puerto Ricans
