= Lo sé todo =

Puerto Rican gossip/news show

- Title card
- Genre: Infotainment; Tabloid television
- Presented by: Yulianna Vargas; Fernan Vélez; Eliezer Ramos; Enrique "Kike" Cruz; Catherine Castro; Michelle López; Saudy Rivera; Cristina Ramos

Production
- Production location: Guaynabo, Puerto Rico
- Running time: 60 minutes (2013-2021) (incl. commercials); 90 minutes (2021-present) (incl. commercials)

Original release
- Network: WAPA
- Release: February 11, 2013 – present

Lo sé todo (I know it all) is a Puerto Rican infotainment and tabloid focused talk-show that airs weekdays on WAPA.

Lo sé todo was created after the cancellation of SuperXclusivo which stemmed from a boycott following comments made by Kobbo Santarrosa through his character La Comay attacking the LGBTQ+ community.

== History ==
On December 4, 2012, Kobbo Santarrosa, through his puppeteering of La Comay, commented on the allegations that the recent murder of a local public relations agent was related to a promiscuous homosexual lifestyle. The comments sparked a backlash, particularly on social media, and started a movement to boycott the show. The movement crowd-sourced requests for sponsors to drop support for the show, and within a week, sixteen sponsors had removed their commercials from the show's timeslot.

On January 8, 2013, after being asked to pre-record the show rather than present it live, Santarrosa abruptly left WAPA-TV. The next day, January 9, 2013, Santarrosa presented his resignation in person at WAPA-TV.

The resignation of Santarrosa essentially cancelled SuperXclusivo leaving WAPA without a show at the 6:00 p.m. time slot, a time slot where WAPA had led in the ratings through the entirety of SuperXclusivo's run.

On January 30, 2013, WAPA announced that they had found a replacement for SuperXclusivo in the form of a new show that would also focus on entertainment news and gossip and that the show would be called Lo sé todo. The original cast for Lo sé todo consisted of Jessica Serrano, Sylvia Hernandez and Frankie Jay (all whom worked at SuperXclusivo) and they would be joined by Topy Mamery and radio personality Rocky "The Kid". The premiere date of the show (February 11, 2013) was decided through a fan poll on WAPA's website.

On May 9, 2019, WAPA announced a complete overhaul of its daytime schedule which would shift every program to a new time slot. The change included expanding their newscast (NotiCentro) to an hour and a half and adding a new show (Guerreros) after the newscast. The new schedule would move Lo sé todo to the 3:00 p.m. time slot and would put the show as the lead-in for NotiCentro. The new time slot went into effect on May 20, 2019.

On July 21, 2021, WAPA announced the arrival of political commentator Jay Fonseca to the network. Fonseca would join WAPA as the host of two shows, Los Datos son los Datos (Facts are Facts) which would air weekdays at 3:30 p.m. and Cuarto Poder (Fourth Power) which would air on Tuesdays at 10:00 p.m.. The arrival of Fonseca and his daytime show would mean another time slot change for Lo sé todo. Following the premiere of Los Datos son los Datos, Lo sé todo moved to the 2:00 p.m. time slot, the show also was extended from 60 minutes to 90 minutes.

== On-air staff ==
=== Current on-air staff ===
- Yulianna Vargas, host
- Fernan Vélez, host
- Catherine Castro, host
- Michelle López, host
- Eliezer Ramos, field reporter
- Enrique "Kike" Cruz, political analyst
- Saudy Rivera, reporter
- Cristina Ramos, reporter

=== Former on-air staff ===
- Pedro Juan Figueroa (deceased)
- Topy Mamery (deceased)
- Frankie Jay (now at FJ Directo)
- Jessica Serrano (now at TeleOnce)
- Sylvia Hernández (now at Telemundo Puerto Rico)
- Roque Gallart (now at La Nueva 94 and La Megaestación Digital)
- Sonya Cortés
- Alejandro Gil (now at TeleOnce)
- Alex Díaz (now at KQ 105)
- Alí Warrington (now at KQ 105)
- Carmen Jovet (now at ABC Puerto Rico)
- Jose Vallenilla (Funky Joe) (now at La Mega)
- Rafael José (now at WIPR-TV)
- Luis Enrique Falú (now at Telemundo Puerto Rico)
- Gary Rodríguez (now at TeleOnce)
- Jacky Fontánez (now at Telemundo Puerto Rico)
- Patricia Corcino
- Gredmarie Colón
- Brenda Rivera (now at WIPR-TV and TeleOnce)

== Lo Sé Todo (Colombian version) ==
Lo Sé Todo Colombia is a Colombian adaptation of the Puerto Rican program of the same name that aired on January 22, 2018, on Canal 1 in Colombia.
