= French Opera House =

Non-extant building in the French Quarter of New Orleans

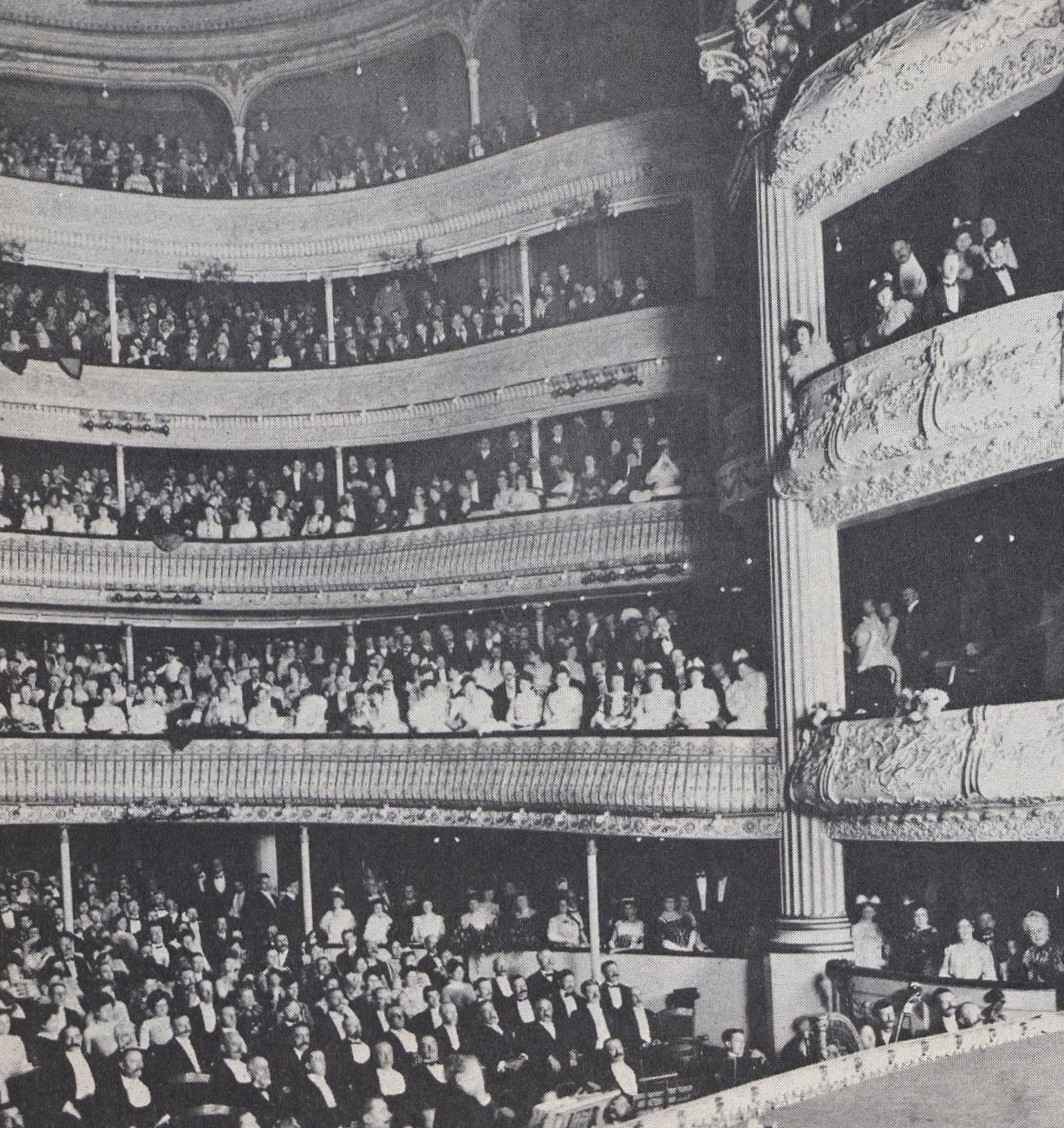
- French Opera Opening Night Interior, New Orleans, c.1901
- Interactive map of the French Opera House area

General information
- Location: New Orleans, Louisiana, 541 Bourbon Street
- Coordinates: 29°57′28″N 90°03′59″W
- Opened: 1859
- Demolished: 1919

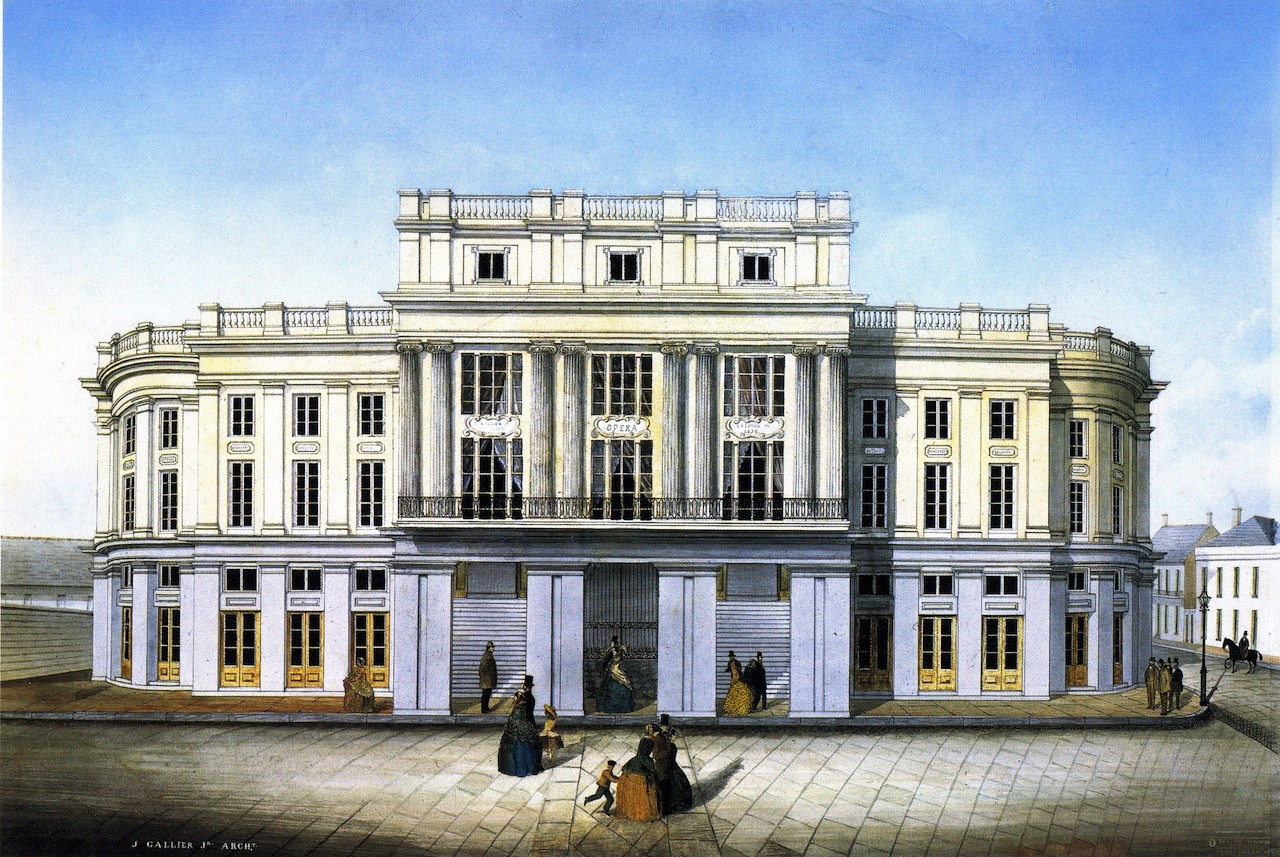
The Opera House shortly after it opened in 1859, as painted by Marie Adrien Persac.

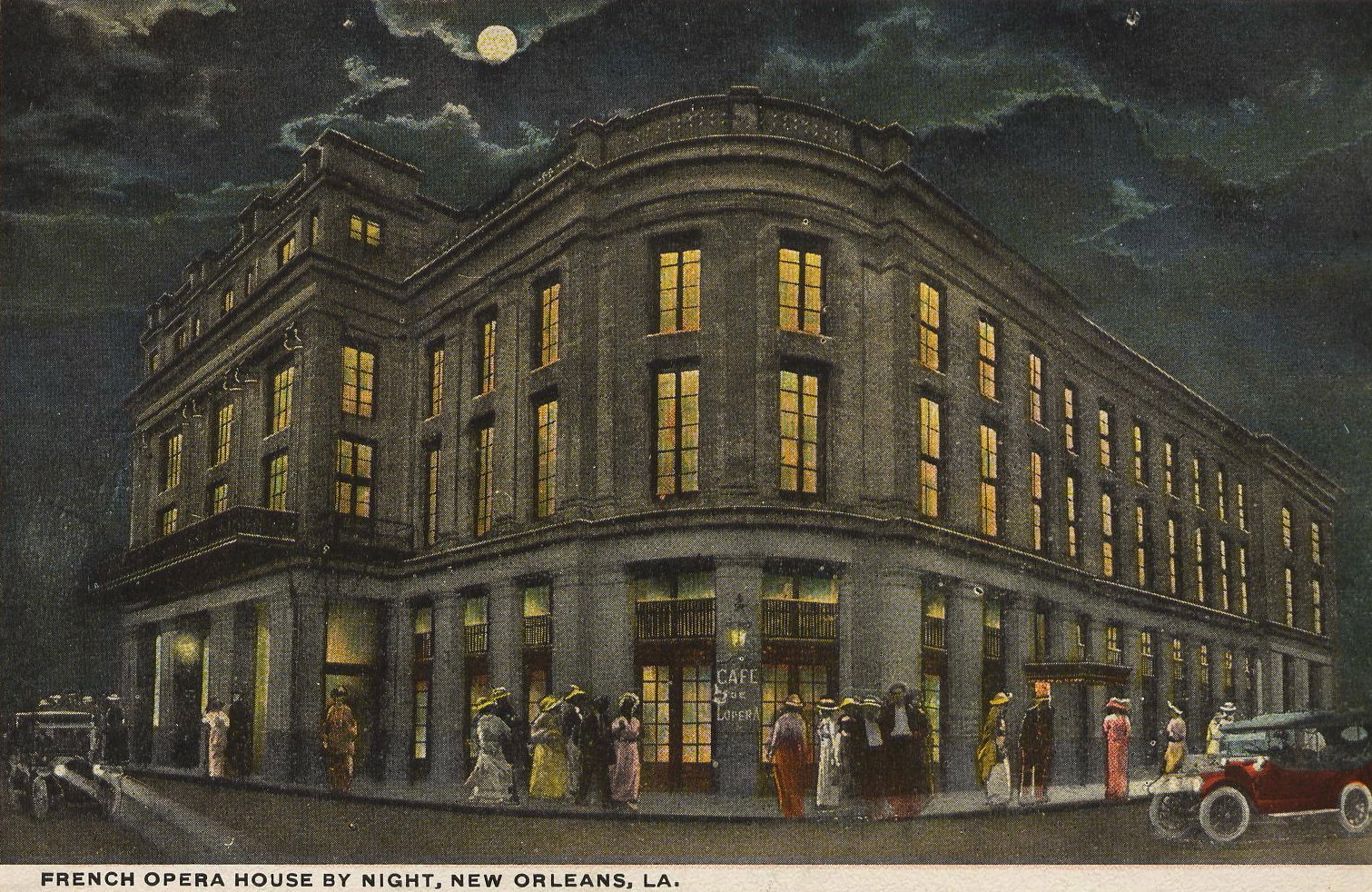
Postcard view from late in the building's history

The French Opera House, or Théâtre de l'Opéra, was an opera house in New Orleans. It was one of the city's landmarks from its opening in 1859 until it was destroyed by fire in 1919. It stood in the French Quarter at the corner of Bourbon and Toulouse Streets, with the main entrance on Bourbon. The site is currently occupied by the Four Points by Sheraton French Quarter.

== History ==
Designed by James Gallier Jr., the hall was commissioned by Charles Boudousquié, then the director of the opera company, which had previously made its home in the Théâtre d'Orléans. After a dispute with new owners of the Orléans, Boudousquié determined to build a grand new house for French opera. The building went up in less than a year at a cost of $118,500 and for the next sixty years, it was the center of social activity in New Orleans. Not only opera was held there, but also Carnival balls, debuts, benefits, receptions, and concerts. On May 23, 1859, the New Orleans Delta gave a description of the new theater:

The building of the opera house at the corner of Bourbon and Toulouse streets is going ahead briskly. The foundations have been laid, and the front walls have almost reached a height of one story. The great area of the theater attracts the attention of everybody; and as all our opera-going population feel more or less interest in it, we think some account of the shape, plan, and style of the building, will be acceptable.
It will be a handsome structure of the Italian order of architecture, with a front of one hundred and sixty-six feet on Bourbon street, one hundred and eighty-seven on Toulouse street, and a height of about eighty feet in its highest part. The edifice will rise like a colossus over everything in that vicinity.

By April 25, 1862, New Orleans had been captured by Union forces in the US Civil War and the French Opera ceased to present performances until the end of the war. However, in 1864, the wife of Union General Nathaniel P. Banks held a ball at the theater in honor of George Washington's birthday. At the end of the War, the French Opera House was reopened and continued to present many American operatic premieres.

By 1913, however, the house had fallen on hard times and was forced into receivership. An anonymous donor (later identified as William Ratcliffe Irby) purchased the building and donated it to Tulane University, along with the wherewithal to operate it under the new leadership of the French tenor Agustarello Affre. The building reopened, but went up in flames on the night of December 4, 1919. The last performance was Giacomo Meyerbeer's Les Huguenots, a long favorite amongst old family Creoles. [WPA Photograph Collection]

The French Opera House itself was the most fashionable establishment in New Orleans in the years between the Civil War and World War I. The first night of the opera season was the opening of the social season in New Orleans, and it is an important feature of New Orleans social life, attendance being a social event of importance in accordance with its rituals and traditions. The French Opera season became the center of social life for New Orleans' elite, with the oldest and most prominent families owning seats in the theater's boxes or "Loges Grilles".

== American premieres ==
- 1860: Martha (French Version) by Friedrich von Flotow
- 1861: Le pardon de Ploërmel by Giacomo Meyerbeer
- 1871: Mignon by Ambroise Thomas
- 1883: Le roi de Lahore by Jules Massenet
- 1885: Mireille by Charles Gounod
- 1888: Le tribut de Zamora by Gounod
- 1889: La reine de Saba by Gounod
- 1890: Le Roi d'Ys by Edouard Lalo
- 1890: Le Cid by Massenet
- 1891: Sigurd by Ernest Reyer
- 1892: Hérodiade by Massenet
- 1893: Esclarmonde by Massenet
- 1893: Samson et Dalila by Camille Saint-Saëns
- 1895: Le portrait de Manon by Massenet
- 1900: Salammbo by Reyer
- 1902: Cendrillon by Massenet
- 1906: Siberia by Umberto Giordano
- 1907: Adriana Lecouvreur by Francesco Cilea
- 1912: Don Quichotte by Massenet

== See also ==
- New Orleans Opera
- Théâtre d'Orléans
- Theatre de la Rue Saint Pierre
- List of opera houses

== Bibliography ==
- Curtis, N. C. (1929). "New Orleans: The French Opera House 1859–1917", The Western Architect, vol. 38, no. 1 (January 12, 1929), pp. 5–8.
- Leslie's Weekly, December 11, 1902
- Tallant, Robert (1950). Romantic New Orleanians. New York: E.P. Dutton, p. 119
