= Gallier House =

- U.S. National Register of Historic Places
- U.S. National Historic Landmark
- U.S. National Historic Landmark District – Contributing property
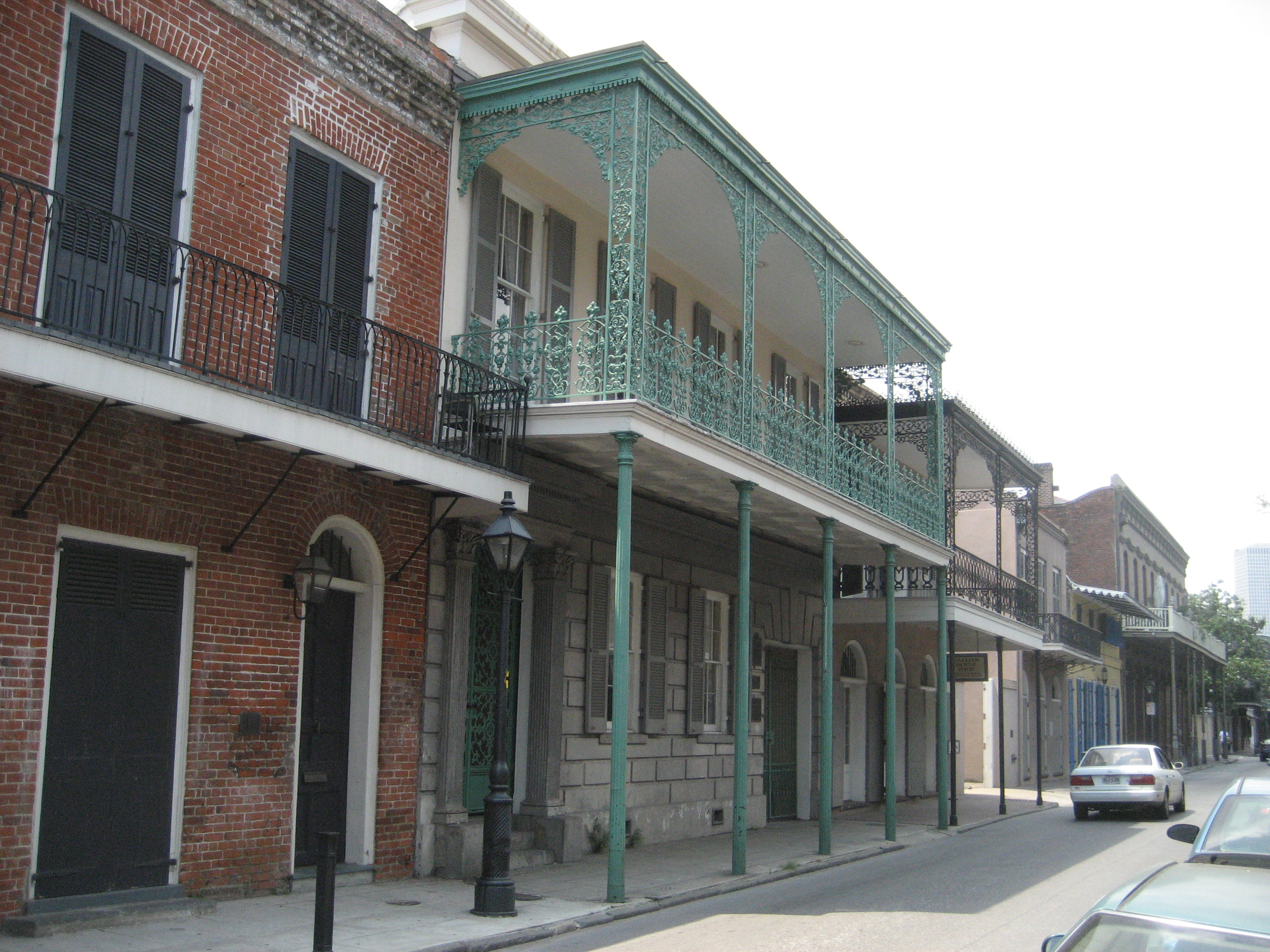
- Gallier House (with green gallery)

- Location within East New Orleans Location within Louisiana Location within the United States
- Location: 1132 Royal St., New Orleans, Louisiana
- Coordinates: 29°57′40.76″N 90°3′41.01″W
- Built: 1857
- Architect: James Gallier Jr.
- Architectural style: Greek Revival, Italianate
- Part of: Vieux Carre Historic District (ID66000377)
- NRHP reference No.: 74000932

Significant dates
- Added to NRHP: February 15, 1974
- Designated NHL: May 30, 1974
- Designated NHLDCP: December 21, 1965

Gallier House is a restored 19th-century historic house museum located on Royal Street in the French Quarter of New Orleans, Louisiana.

It was originally the home of prominent New Orleans architect, James Gallier Jr. Construction began in 1857 and he moved in with his wife and children in 1860.

The fully furnished house includes a courtyard garden, elegant carriageway, and slave quarters. The interior is restored and furnished in the style of the 1850s. The home boasts numerous technological and architectural advancements for its time, offering a glimpse into 19th-century cutting-edge design. It was declared a National Historic Landmark in 1974 for its association with Gallier, one of the city's most important architects of the mid-19th century.

In 1996, the Woman's Exchange acquired this house from Tulane University. The Gallier House has been restored as a New Orleans landmark.

== Architecture ==
The house is eclectic, combining Italianate features such as stucco treatment with classical elements like the formal front entrance. The stucco covering protected the soft, locally made brick from erosion by wind and water. The building was constructed of brick-on-brick foundations which increase the width below the surface.

The front entry is protected by the original cast iron gate. Much of the cast iron in the French Quarter was purchased from catalogs, so it was not as unique as the wrought iron. The front gate of Gallier House, however, was designed by James Gallier Jr. specifically for this house.

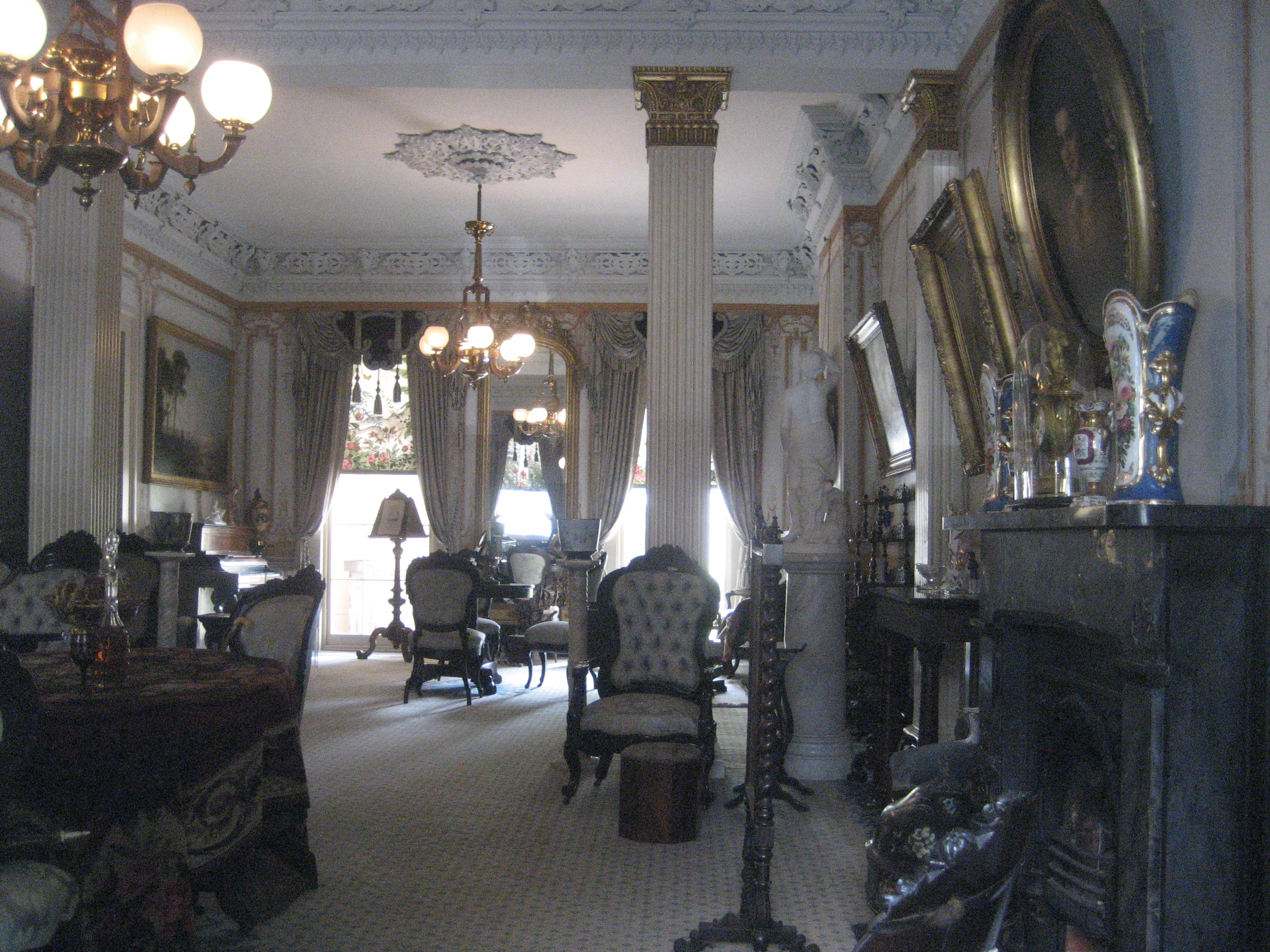
Gallier house parlor.

== In popular culture ==
Gallier House appears in season 1 of AMC's 2022 series Interview with the Vampire as the home of the New Orleans-dwelling vampires Lestat, Louis, and Claudia.

The exterior of Gallier House is used in episode 1 of American Horror Story: Coven as the exterior of Madame Lalaurie's mansion.

The house also served as a filming location for season 3 of Banshee (2015), Angel Heart (1987), The Joy that Kills (1984), Hobson's Choice (1983), and Cat People (1982).

== See also ==
- Hermann-Grima House, another French Quarter historic house museum operated by the Woman's Exchange
- List of National Historic Landmarks in Louisiana
- National Register of Historic Places listings in Orleans Parish, Louisiana
