= WAPA Media Group =

American media company

- Type: Private
- Industry: Radio and TV
- Founded: 2023; 3 years ago
- Headquarters: Guaynabo, Puerto Rico
- Area served: Puerto Rico; United States
- Owner: Hemisphere Media Group
- Divisions: WAPA-TV; WAPA América; WAPA Deportes; WAPA Digital; WKAQ-AM; WKAQ-FM
- Website: wapa.tv

WAPA Media Group is an American mass media and entertainment corporation with headquarters in Guaynabo, Puerto Rico. It is a subsidiary of the media conglomerate Hemisphere Media Group.

WAPA Media Group is mainly involved in television and radio production. The company is named after WAPA-TV, the call sign of the flagship television station primarily owned by Hemisphere Media Group before launching WAPA Media Group. The company encompasses WAPA-TV, its repeater stations across Puerto Rico, WAPA América (cable superstation), WAPA Digital (digital media division), WAPA Deportes (Sports Division), WKAQ-AM, and WKAQ-FM.

== History ==
=== Televicentro de Puerto Rico ===
First established in 1954, WAPA-TV was the second network to broadcast in Puerto Rico. Its call sign refers to the Association of Sugar Producers (Asociación de Productores de Azúcar) though its parent company was referred to as Televicentro de Puerto Rico. From 1998 until the channel's October 2006 acquisition by Hemisphere Media Group and InterMedia Partners for $130 million, the channel was referred to on air as Televicentro instead of WAPA Television. LIN TV completed the sale of its Puerto Rico television operations on March 30, 2007. On December 17, 2007, the station changed its branding from Televicentro to WAPA, developed a new format, changed its jingle, and redesigned its website.

=== WAPA Media Group ===
On May 9, 2022, Hemisphere Media Group purchased WKAQ, WKAQ-FM, WUKQ, WUKQ-FM, and WYEL from Univision Radio, seeking to merge the radio stations into the WAPA brand.

On September 1, 2023, Hemisphere Media Group purchased WKAQ-AM and WKAQ-FM and announced that it would spin off WAPA-TV, WAPA Sports, WAPA América, and these two radio stations into a subsidiary. Jorge Hidalgo was selected as CEO of WAPA Media, while retaining his position as President and General Manager of the WAPA-TV station. Meanwhile, Héctor Martínez Souss continues to serve as President and General Manager of WKAQ-AM and WKAQ-FM.

== Assets ==
=== WAPA Television ===
- WAPA-TV San Juan (Independent)
- WAPA Deportes - Sports Channel
- WNJX-TV Mayaguez (Independent, Telemundo on DT4)
- WTIN-TV Ponce (Independent, Telemundo on DT4)
- WOTF-TV Orlando, Florida (Independent)
- WAPA América - Cable superstation which broadcasts WAPA-TV programming in the United States
- WAPA Digital - Social Media Platform and Website

=== Radio ===
- WKAQ 580 AM - Spanish News/Talk
- WKAQ-FM 104.7 FM - Bilingual Top 40
- WUKQ 1420 AM - Spanish News/Talk
- WUKQ-FM 98.7 FM - Bilingual Top 40
- WYEL 600 AM - Spanish News/Talk

== External links and sources ==
- Official website
- The Museum of Broadcasting – Puerto Rico TV Profile
