= WKAQ (AM) =

Radio station in San Juan, Puerto Rico

WKAQ and WUKQ
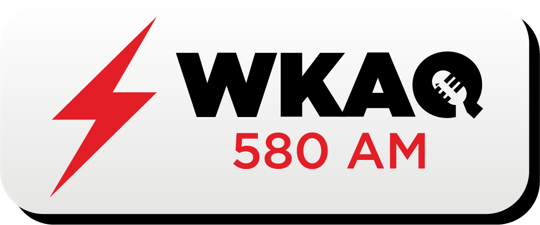

WKAQ: San Juan, Puerto Rico; WUKQ: Ponce, Puerto Rico; United States
- Broadcast area: Puerto Rico
- Frequencies: WKAQ: 580 kHz; WUKQ: 1420 kHz
- Branding: WKAQ 580

Programming
- Language(s): Spanish
- Format: Talk radio

Ownership
- Owner: WAPA Media Group; (WLII/WSUR License Partnership, G.P.)
- Sister stations: WAPA-TV; WKAQ-FM/WUKQ-FM; WYEL

History
- First air date: WKAQ: December 3, 1922; WUKQ: June 3, 1958
- Former call signs: WUKQ: WEUC (1958–2000)
- Former frequencies: WKAQ: 830 kHz (1922–1934); 1240 kHz (1934–1942); 620 kHz (1942–1951)

Technical information
- Licensing authority: FCC
- Facility ID: WKAQ: 19099; WUKQ: 9352
- Class: WKAQ: B; WUKQ: B
- Power: WKAQ: 10,000 watts; WUKQ: 1,000 watts unlimited
- Transmitter coordinates: WKAQ: 18°25′48.9″N 66°8′7.7″W; WUKQ: 17°59′16″N 66°37′19.7″W

Links
- Public license information: WKAQ: Public file; LMS; WUKQ: Public file; LMS
- Website: wkaq580.com

WKAQ (580 AM), branded on-air as WKAQ 580, is a commercial radio station in San Juan, Puerto Rico. Currently owned by WAPA Media Group, the station airs a Spanish language talk radio format. Its programming is repeated on WUKQ (1420 AM) in Ponce and WYEL (600 AM) in Mayagüez. The station was the first radio station in Puerto Rico. According to Ernesto Vigoreaux, in the early days of music in Puerto Rico, the musicians would record music at the WKAQ radio station. WKAQ is the Puerto Rico primary entry point station for the Emergency Alert System.

WKAQ was owned for many years by Angel Ramos, owner of the El Mundo newspaper, and eventual namesake for WKAQ-TV, branded as Telemundo. The El Mundo operated until 1986 when labor strikes and acts of terrorism ended its operation.

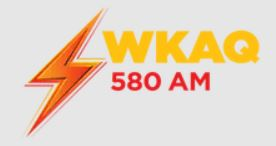
Previous logo

On May 9, 2022, Hemisphere Media Group, the owners of WAPA-TV, announced they would purchase WKAQ, WKAQ-FM, WUKQ, WUKQ-FM and WYEL from Univision Radio. The deal marks Hemisphere's entry into the radio business. During WAPA's 2023 upfront presentation, the network's management alluded that talent from the channel would also be joining the radio stations in the future and vice versa.

On September 1, 2023, Hemisphere Media Group announced that the deal to buy WKAQ-AM and WKAQ-FM had been finalized and that they would be spinning off their media properties into a subsidiary called WAPA Media. The conglomerate would include WAPA-TV, WAPA Deportes (WAPA-TV Sub-channel), WAPA América, and the two radio stations.

== Notable current on-air staff ==
- Jay Fonseca - Jay en el 580
- Rubén Sánchez - Temprano en la Mañana
- Carlos Díaz Olivo – political analyst WKAQ Analiza
- Luis Pabón Roca - political analyst WKAQ Analiza
- Veronique Abreu Tañon - WKAQ Intimus
- José Efraín Hernández - Cátedra 580
- Néstor Duprey - Cátedra 580
- Mayra López Mulero - Mayra en el 580
- Osvaldo Carlo Linares - Fiscalía 580
- Ernie Cabán - Fiscalía 580
- Enrique “Kike” Cruz - WKAQ en la Tarde
