= WKAQ-FM =

Radio station in San Juan, Puerto Rico

WKAQ-FM / WUKQ-FM
- WKAQ-FM: San Juan, Puerto Rico WUKQ-FM: Mayagüez, Puerto Rico; Puerto Rico
- Broadcast area: Puerto Rico
- Frequencies: 104.7 MHz; 98.7 MHz
- Branding: KQ105 FM

Programming
- Languages: Spanish and English
- Format: Top 40/CHR

Ownership
- Owner: WAPA Media Group; (WLII/WSUR License Partnership, G.P.)
- Sister stations: WAPA-TV; WKAQ; WYEL

History
- First air date: WKAQ-FM: October 8, 1958; 67 years ago WUKQ-FM: January 1963; 63 years ago
- Former call signs: WKAQ-FM: none WUKQ-FM: WKJB-FM (1963–1997); WUKQ (1997–2000)
- Former frequencies: WUKQ-FM: 99.1 MHz (1963–2012)

Technical information
- Licensing authority: FCC
- Facility ID: 19098; 54818
- Class: B
- ERP: WKAQ-FM: 50,000 watts WUKQ-FM: 31,000 watts
- HAAT: WKAQ-FM: 872.0 meters (2,860.9 ft); WUKQ-FM: 676.0 meters (2,217.8 ft)
- Transmitter coordinates: 18°16′51″N 66°56′38″W

Links
- Public license information: / WUKQ-FM Public file; 54818 LMS
- Webcast: https://www.kq105.com/
- Website: www.kq105.com

WKAQ-FM (104.7 MHz, "KQ105 FM") along with its satellite WUKQ-FM (98.7 MHz) are a pair of radio stations in Puerto Rico broadcasting a bilingual contemporary hit radio format. Licensed to San Juan, Puerto Rico, WKAQ-FM serves the eastern half of the island while WUKQ-FM, licensed to Mayagüez, Puerto Rico, serves the western half. The stations are currently owned by WAPA Media Group.

The stations are relayed through booster stations, WKAQ-FM1 in Juana Díaz and WKAQ-FM2 in Fajardo, both operating at 104.7 FM, also on WUKQ-FM1 in Mayagüez, at 98.7 FM.

KQ105 FM Radio is best known for its concerts "KQusticos", "KQ Live Concert", "KQ Sunsets", "Uforia Lounge @The Mall of San Juan", popular hit music playlists, and for its great variety of music including all genres of pop, ballads, few salsa and merengue, and even reggaeton. It's also characterized for having less commercials per hour than any other local station with a programming based only on music 24 hours, 7 days a week, except from 3PM to 7PM, which airs La Tendencia de Molusco, and on Saturdays (Sundays repeated) were there is a live Top 20 Countdown involving interviews to artists, presenting the top 20 best music of the week, and local/international news on artists such as gossips.

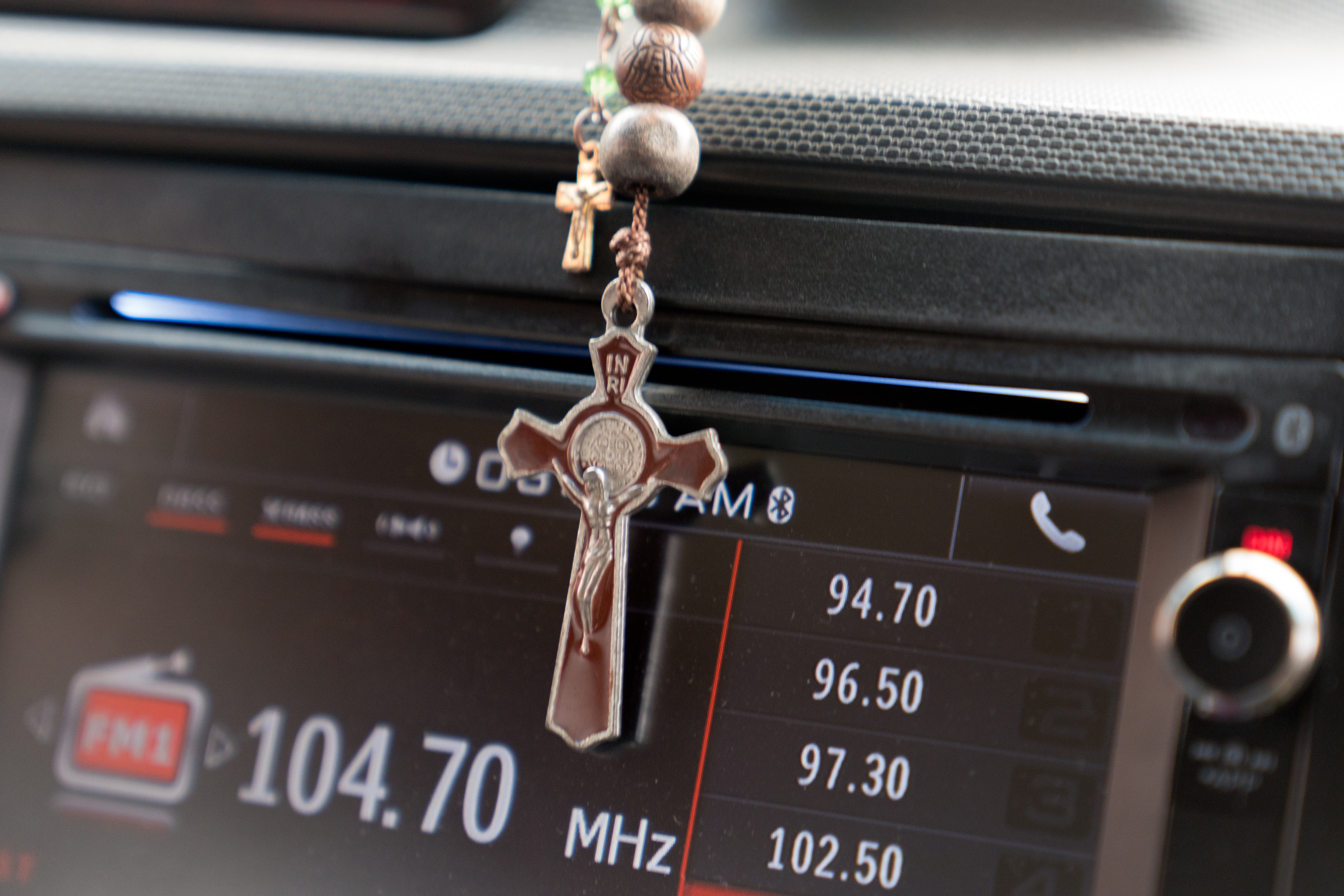
Crucifix closeup and 104.7 radio station in Puerto Rico

Also the branding "LA PRIMERA" means that WKAQ-FM was the first FM assigned frequency to San Juan and the second radio station established in the island on October 8, 1958, followed by Rio Piedras's WFID (Fidelity) on November of the same year. However, WKAQ-FM became more notorious in 1968 when they started its format of popular music with the logo "LA ESTACIÓN DE LAS ESTRELLAS" and "ESTRELLAS EN ESTÉREO" making noticeable their Stereophonic sound. Later in 1975, WKAQ-FM started broadcasting in quadraphonic sound, using a Sansui QS encoder and they started promoting it but this experiment didn't last long. In the early 1980s WKAQ AM turned into news talk radio and the FM changed to Top 40's renamed KQ 105 La Primera until today. WKAQ AM–FM–TV were owned and operated by Don Angel Ramos, who also owned the El Mundo newspaper.

Previous logo

On May 9, 2022, Hemisphere Media Group, the owners of WAPA-TV, announced they would purchase WKAQ, WKAQ-FM, WUKQ, WUKQ-FM and WYEL from Univision Radio. The deal marks Hemisphere's entry to the radio business. During WAPA's 2023 upfront presentation, the network's management alluded that talent from the channel would also be joining the radio stations in the future and vice versa.

On September 1, 2023, Hemisphere Media Group announced that the deal to buy WKAQ-AM and WKAQ-FM had been finalized and that they would be spinning off their media properties into a new conglomerate called WAPA Media. The conglomerate would include WAPA-TV, WAPA Deportes (WAPA-TV Sub-channel), WAPA América and the two radio stations.
