= Vigoreaux =

Vigoreaux is a surname. Notable people with the surname include:

- Luis Vigoreaux (1929–1983), Puerto Rican radio and television personality
- Luisito Vigoreaux (born 1951), Puerto Rican actor and producer
- Marie Vigoreaux (c. 1639 – 1679), French fortune teller and poisoner
- Roberto Vigoreaux (born 1956), Puerto Rican television host and politician
