= Luisito Vigoreaux =

Puerto Rican actor

- Born: Luis Vigoreaux Lorenzana; July 1, 1951 (age 75); San Juan, Puerto Rico
- Occupations: Actor, Producer and Host

Luis Vigoreaux Lorenzana Jr. (born July 1, 1951) is a Puerto Rican actor and producer. He is the son of Luis Vigoreaux, a media personality and Rosaura Lorenzana Vilches. He is the brother of Roberto Vigoreaux, former senator, television producer, actor, singer, marketing executive, telecommunications technician and entrepreneur. At the time of his murder, Vigoreaux Sr. had been working with his father on a new TV show named A Millón, for WAPA-TV. Aspiring to become a producer, Vigoreaux was to assist his father with production for the show; however, with his father's death, he became the show's main producer. Under Vigoreaux, A Millón, became the #1 game show for several years, hosted by Hector Marcano, Sonia Noemí, and Rafael Jose.

In 1984, Vigoreaux began an entertainment career by co-hosting a daily game show with his brother Roberto called Parejo, Doble y Triple (Square, Double and Triple), at WAPA-TV. Vigoreaux's appearance on this show dramatically increased his popularity within Puerto Rico. Vigoreaux went on to host other shows such as Sabado en Grande (Big Saturday, also with Roberto), El Show del Mediodía (The Midday Show) and De Magazin, one of several successful media partnerships with talent agent and former beauty queen Desiree Lowry. He has since hosted, co-hosted and/or produced several other shows, both on television and radio. His most controversial show has been Sunshine's Café, a comedy starring Sunshine Logroño that aired in the mid-to late 1980s.

== Early years ==
In June 1952 he was baptized Catholic at Iglesia Santa Teresita de Jesús, his godparents being José Ramón Vigoreaux and Gelly de Vigoreaux. He was one of three siblings from this matrimony of whom the youngest, Felipe, died at the age of nine. Due to his parentage, Vigoreaux received media attention from his early years, with his first grade graduation being the subject of a newspaper column. While in school, he participated in his first theatrical plays. In his youth, he participated in various society events at San Juan. In 1967, Vigoreaux participated in the coronation of the queen of New York's Puerto Rican Day Parade, Raquel Solano of Santurce, whom he accompanied. In 1969, Vigoreaux worked as a referee for the Voleyball Superior Femenino. In 1970, Vigoreaux was part of a Banco de Ponce team that won the Baloncesto Interbanco. He returned to the team the following season, which it once again advanced to the finals. In March 1973, Vigoreaux became the owner of the Banco de Ponce's basketball team in the Torneo Interbancario. He returned to the league in the same role the following year. Vigoreaux also served as part of the directors of the Banco de Ponce's annual golf tournament. In September 1978, Vigoreaux became the account executive of the Young & Rubicam public relations firm. In October 1979, Vigoreaux offered a merchandising conference titled Ejemplo de Propósitos y Apelaciones en Anuncios at Universidad Central de Bayamón (UCB).

In January 1983, his father was found murdered, burned to death inside the trunk of his car. In 1984, the late producer's wife, Lydia Echevarría was accused as the intellectual author of the murder. Vigoreaux was less involved with the public coverage of the case than his brother, instead participating in memorials including receiving a painting that honored his father from Antonio Rosario along his mother. He also received an in memoriam plaque from the Asociación de Agencias Publicitarias de Puerto Rico. While the trial was still being prepared, Tropical Development Corporation filed a lawsuit against the Vigoreaux brothers and Echevarría demanding mortgage execution. Another case was filed in the San Juan District Court over debt that Vigoreaux Enterprises had with the Girod Trust Company, with the finances of the deceased artists becoming a topic of contention between Echevarría's defense and the prosecution.

== Entertainment career ==
=== Vigoreaux brothers act ===
In August 1983, Vigoreaux worked with WBMJ in Buenos Días Puerto Rico and Plaza Tours in tourism events. In November 1983, he took over as presenter in the tenth edition of the Festival de la Canción y la Voz de Puerto Rico, a role that his father had performed for years. He also replaced his father in the morning radio show Buenos Días Puerto Rico along Luis Francisco Ojeda and Elsa Fernández Miralles. The arrest of Echevarría in September 1984 caused widespread shock throughout the Puerto Rican artistic community, a sentiment shared by the Vigoreaux children. During the preliminary hearing against Echevarría and the other accused, the prosecution tried to include him as a last-minute witness. In February 1985, the Vigoreaux brothers debuted the evening game show Parejo, doble o triple at WAPA-TV. Producer Elín Ortiz expected the brothers to refresh the programming of the channel, presenting the show in a press conference at the Condado Holiday Inn. The duo, which were described as "the most innovative" aspect of this overhaul, also appeared in other programming such as Charytín.

In May 1985, Vigoreaux served as the presenter of Son Borincano, an event dedicated to Puerto Rican music and featuring Chucho Avellanet and Tony Croatto among others. The following month, he joined Fufi Santori, Manuel Rivera Morales and Héctor Martínez in NotiUno's (WUNO) basketball talk show Baloncesto al Día. Parejo, doble y triple proved a success, receiving additional slots Tuesdays and Thursdays, with their style being compared to that of their father. The brothers were also selected as co-presenters of Sábado en Grande, which was placed opposite of WKAQ-TV's Súper Sábados. The brothers were part of the 1985 Fiestas de la Constitución organized by the government and the Institute of Puerto Rican Culture, being featured in a stage at Castillo San Felipe del Morro. In September 1985, the Vigoreaux were cast as a pair of twins in the comedy play Tú y yo somos tres staged at Teatro Tapia. During this time, the entertainment media described the duo as "the hottest property in town", but also speculated that despite their onscreen chemistry they could become overexposed. In the late summer, they were also contracted to make a show at the historic pre-Columbian site Cueva Pajita in Lares. They returned to the cavern for an encore in October 1985.

In November 1985, the brothers served as masters of ceremonies for a concert of the pop band Los Chikles at San Germán. Vigoreaux was also an invited guest in Adalberto Rodríguez's comedy show La Taberna Budweiser. By the years's end, the brothers were noted to have gained influence over the administration at WAPA-TV. The Vigoreaux also returned to radio by co-hosting the morning programming for Radio Rock. In March 1986, Vigoreaux joined celebrity softball team Equipo Nacional de Softbol de Artistas. In March 1967, the brothers began hosting Bacardi's Noches de San Juan on Fridays. Outside television, the brothers collaborated with Sunshine Logroño on the production of events. Vigoreaux rarely perform as a singer, but frequently took a role as a percussionist. In 1986, both Luisito and his brother Roberto appeared in a Burger King commercial for the Puerto Rican market, where they acted and sang. In the Show de Charytín her played a role in comedy skits. Vigoreaux also received a cooking section in the morning show Hoy. He was one of several celebrity chefs that accepted a public invitation issued by longstanding television presenter Pepe H. Rodríguez to appear in his WORO-TV show Cocinando con Pepe H. during the summer of 1986.

=== Role as a media producer ===
In August 1986, Vigoreaux was removed from the cast of Sábado en Grande. The reason later stated by his brother was that his personality was causing a backstage clash. The brothers returned to host the 1986 MDA tele-marathon. Vigoreaux was also contracted to host a series of events for the Puerto Rico Tourism Company. In October 1986, Vigoreaux debuted the morning cooking comedy show Entrando por la Cocina in WAPA-TV, with Silverio Pérez as writer. The following month, he served as guest cook at the Festival del Vino. The brothers reunited in Silverio Pérez's Peña en Down Beat. In January 1987, WAPA-TV cancelled Parejo, doble y triple. Later that month, Vigoreaux held a reunion with the General Manager of WLUZ-TV, George Rivera, about the possibility of joining that station. The brothers created Hermandad Luis Vigoreaux, which worked with the municipality of Ceiba to build a monument for their father. In February 1987, Vigoreaux was selected the Rey Momo of the Carnaval Juan Ponce de León 1987. In March 1987, Vigoreaux was the master of ceremonies of a Los Chicles concert. The following month, he was part of Bicicletada Familiar con Pacheco, a bicycling road race sponsored by WAPA-TV and the municipality of San Juan. He also joined a basketball celebrities team.

Vigoreaux was a candidate for the Mr. Personality Award at Festival de Arte El Cemí, while Entrando por la Cocina was nominated in the Comedy of the Year category. He produced and acted in the mini-novella and musical comedy La oficina al revés, written by Silverio Pérez and staged at various hotels. He played the character of "Don Jacinto". During the summer he worked with Cervecería India and Caribe Hilton for the Noche de San Juan. In July 1987, Vigoreaux debuted the game show El Gordo de Oro on WAPA-TV. He was also given the role of presenter in A millón, his father's last concept for the station. Vigoreaux worked with Shorty Castro and Sunshine Logroño in a comedy show at Festival de Agua Dulce in Ciales. He also collaborated with Producciones Taurinas on televising the 25th Anniversary show of El Gran Combo de Puerto Rico. The brothers reunited in La Hora de Oro for WAPA-TV. Vigoreaux also worked along Pedro Telemaco in El Show del Mediodía. He would made occasional appearances in other channels, such as a guest appearance in TeleOnce's Dime la verdad.

In April 1988, Entrando por la cocina was reconceptualized with a script by Walter Rodríguez, while cooking segments were focused on Luisito en la cocina de hoy. Vigoreaux also produced A millón, Sunshine’s Café, La Bambalina and Los Genios for the channel. Besides this, he was part of the cast of the play Divorcio por amor. In May 1988, Vigoreaux introduced Eso que estamos buscando to his WAPA-TV lineup, as well as special programing including concerts and a recap of the telenovela Tormento. By the summer of 1988, he was working on the creation of an entertainment and sports newspaper. Vigoreaux also represented the channel in official business, such as welcoming Don Francisco to Puerto Rico and contracted Raúl Carbonell Jr. for the program Contigo ahí. By this time, he noted his interest lied behind the cameras, noting his concern that ongoing competition would cost the channel more talent. In November 1988, the Asociación de Productos de Puerto Rico contracted Vigoreaux to host a government-sponsored fair at Caguas. When he lost Raúl Carbonell Jr., he contractacted Shorty Castro. In December 1988, Vigoreaux joined Rafo Muñiz in the play La pareja dispareja. His performance received positive criticism, despite his lack of theater experience being noted. He produced WAPA-TV's New Year's Eve special. Vigoreaux was part of the show when Rafael Hernández Colón was inaugurated as governor and the government's Three Kings Day party in January 1989.

That same month, he was tasked with overseeing programming reorganization at WAPA-TV. Among these he contemplated bringing in La pareja dispareja from theatre to television. The brothers were invited guests to the TeleOnce talk show Soy Awilda. In February 1989, Vigoreaux produced Cartas de Amor, a special dedicated to his father. In February 1989, La pareja dispareja returned to the stage at Centro de Bellas Artes. He also formed part of a WAPA-TV collaboration with Walt Disney World. The Vigoreaux brothers and their wives were selected to lead the 1989-1990 campaign of the Liga Puertorriqueña Contra el Cáncer. In March 1989, he hosted the Club Cívico de Damas de Puerto Rico's formal hat parade. The following month, Vigoreaux produced the comedy La Oficina al Revés: El Conflicto Final, the third part of a trilogy that first began being staged in 1987. He was also featured in Mirelsa Modestti's graphic novel Mi verdad es que te amo, starring along Lourdes Collazo. In May 1989, La pareja dispareja returned to stage at Teatro Yagüez in Mayagüez. During this time, Vigoreaux reinaugurated the remodeled theaters Radio City and Excelsior at Santurce, the latter of which designated as a cafe-theater. During the summer, the television adaptation of La pareja dispareja was airing on Sundays under the name ¡Que pareja. In his role as manager of Gilberto Santa Rosa and Conjunto Quisqueya, Vigoreaux made an appearance in WKAQ-TV's Noche de gala. He was also a guest in TeleOnce's Dime la Verdad. As Entrando por la cocina surged in ratings, it was adapted as a theater comedy titled Entrando por la cocina: El Musical.

After hurricane Hugo passed causing severe damages, Vigoreaux coordinated with the producers of all channels to hold a simultaneous tele-marathon titled Dále la mano a Puerto Rico. In December 1989, Vigoreaux produced the Christmas special Un solo rey mago and a homage to his father. To open the year, La pareja dispareja returned to CBA. Vigoreaux won the 1989 Agüeybaná Award for "Producer of the Year". He continued collaborating with the World Disney Resort and WAPA-TV's promotion. As Sunshine's Café was the first rated program in local television, Vigoreaux repurposed the Radio City theater into an actual cafe. In March 1990, he made a guest appearance in WKAQ-TV's Marcano: El Show. This visit led to a ban of talents from other stations being imposed there, as he wore an Entrando por la cocina shirt on air. Vigoreaux produced the comedies El Kiosko Budweiser and Altagracia, empleada doméstica for WAPA-TV. In the second anniversary of Sunshine's Café, he produced an special at Hiram Bithorn Stadium with the guest participation Víctor Alicea. He also participated in a homage to composer Puchi Balseiro. In August 1990, Vigoreaux joined the cast of Sálvemos los delfines. He also produced El Musical at CBA. WAPA-TV cancelled Altagracia, empleada doméstica, but green lighted another Vigoreaux show titled A mi manera that debuted in November 1990.

=== Later years ===
Vigoreaux co-hosted a TV show named Ruben & Co. along with Millie Cangiano. In 2015, he served a co-host of a cooking show named "Conecta'os por la Cocina" along with Bizcocho, another legendary Puerto Rican television personality.

== Personal life ==
His mother died when the siblings were young, due to cancer. Vigoreaux has two other siblings; sisters Vanessa Vigoreaux, an occasional theatrical actress, and Glendalys Vigoreaux. Vigoreaux married Nydia Fernández with whom he had two daughters, Patricia and Priscilla, before divorcing. In 1986, Vigoreaux was scheduled to marry Caridad Pierluisi in a ceremony that was going to be aired through El show de Charytín, but was cancelled when the bride failed to appear without offering an explanation. During the spring of 1988, Vigoreaux began dating Marisol Gallisá. The couple became engaged after a year. They married at Hotel Cerromar in August 1988. After his divorce from Gallisá, Vigoreaux married Dana Miró, also a show host and daughter of Telemundo Puerto Rico's show host Eddie Miró.

Within the industry, Vigoreaux is known for an energetic and difficult temperament. He continued associated with commerce outside television and was a frequent participant at the Expo Cámara fair. Vigoreaux enjoys a close friendship with José Carlos Agrelot, the elder son of Puerto Rican comedian José Miguel Agrelot. Their fathers were best friends and working together at a show the day Luisito and José Jr. were born. Vigoreaux and Jose Jr. were born in the same hospital on the same day. Both of their fathers were eventually buried at the same cemetery after their deaths, just metres from each other. The brothers opposed the commutation of her sentence in 1999. Governor Pedro Rosselló eventually commuted her 208-year sentence, after serving 13 years. In June 1989, Vigoreaux was arrested and charged with driving while under the influence of alcohol. The following month, San Juan Superior Judge found probable cause to proceed to trial. In September 1989, Vigoreaux was found guilty of the charges levied against him.

Vigoreaux is a lifelong gourmand, trying as many plates as possible when traveling. Due to this, he developed a habit of cooking which he later took to television, considering salsas and paellas his best dish and fish, veal and fruits his favorite ingredients. He traveled to New York, where he completed a Master's Degree in Advertising and Public Relations at Syracuse University. Which he used while working as a producer to secure a solid base of advertisers for his shows. During the 1980s, Vigoreaux published the cooking book Luisito en la cocina de hoy. In 1988, he was part of an attempt to make the world's largest rice with chicken plate at Aibonito. In February 1987, Vigoreaux joined Otilio Warrington as hosts of the Festival Gourmet de Puerto Rico, which raised funds for the nonprofit for disabled people Sociedad Nacional de Niños y Adultos Lisiados (SNAL). In February 1988, he returned to the Festival de Gourmets, this time in a food station along Warrington, Pepe H. Rodríguez and other media personalities.

Like his father before him, Vigoreaux is affiliated to the Popular Democratic Party (PPD) and has served as master of ceremonies for its events. When Deborah Carthy Deu was selected Miss Universe 1985, Vigoreaux served as master of ceremonies in an official welcoming held by the governor at La Fortaleza. The brothers replaced their father as co-presenters of the annual tele-marathon to raise funds for the Asociación Contra la Distrofia Muscular de Puerto Rico (MDA), a non-profit that helps in the treatment of patients suffering from muscular dystrophy. When the government's Commission for the Protection and Strengthening of the Family in Puerto Rico held the "Week of the Family" in December 1985, Vigoreaux and Cari Oliver selected to co-host a Day of Family Confraternization at Castillo San Felipe del Morro.

== See also ==
- List of Puerto Ricans
- French immigration to Puerto Rico
- List of television presenters/Puerto Rico
