= Luis Vigoreaux =

Puerto Rican radio and television show host

- Born: Luis Vigoreaux Rivera; April 12, 1928; Ceiba, Puerto Rico
- Died: January 17, 1983 (aged 54); San Juan, Puerto Rico
- Occupations: actor, host, producer
- Spouse(s): Rosaura Lorenzana (1950-1958); Lydia Echevarría (1960-1983)
- Children: Luisito Vigoreaux; Jorge Enrique Vigoreaux (deceased); Roberto Vigoreaux; Glendalys Vigoreaux (deceased); Vanessa Vigoreaux

Luis Vigoreaux Rivera (April 12, 1928 – January 17, 1983) was a Puerto Rican radio and television show host, announcer, comedian and producer. He was considered a pioneer in the television business in Puerto Rico, and enjoyed success with several radio and television shows throughout his career. As a teenager, Vigoreaux found work in a radio station named WIAC (AM), which was managed by Tomás Muñiz (father of Tommy Muñiz). There, Vigoreaux worked on a show called Alma Estudiantil. With the beginning of World War II, most of the professional hosts were enlisted for war, which led to Vigoreaux having the opportunity to work at the station. During that period, Vigoreaux worked in various areas of entertainment and show business. He served as host, presenter, commentator, among other jobs. He also became the spokesperson for Sello Rojo rice in Puerto Rico, which he did for 30 years. Vigoreaux joined Ramón Rivero "Diplo" and José Luis Torregrosa for the radio comedy El Tremendo Hotel. This radio slot enjoyed a large audience for years, and Vigoreaux continued to work as a comedian.

Between 1954 and 1955, he joined fellow comedian José Miguel Agrelot in a theater show that took them to many Latin American communities in the United States. The theater show eventually led to a radio program named Torito and Company, after Torito, the character that Agrelot played. Vigoreaux himself played the character of Don Toribio. With the arrival of television to Puerto Rico in 1954, Vigoreaux began his transition hosting a show called El Show Libby's, sponsored by the company of its namesake. He then hosted the show El tren de la alegría. Vigoreaux later moved to WAPA-TV, motivated by the possibility of working with actor Mario Pabón. They wrote the story for a soap opera, but the project fell through. However, Vigoreaux moved on when he and his second wife, Lydia Echevarria, began hosting the show named La Hora Cero. The show presented many local and international singers, including Celia Cruz, José Feliciano and Marco Antonio Muñiz. In 1970, Vigoreaux developed a game show named Sube Nene, Sube. Hosted by Vigoreaux it became one of the most seen shows in Puerto Rican television history. Due to this success, WAPA-TV asked Vigoreaux to produce and host a few more game shows. Vigoreaux responded by creating Pa'rriba, Papi, Pa'rriba, which was a variation of Sube Nene, Sube. With the creation of Dale que dale en domingo, he had media presence throughout the week. With the production and hosting of all those shows at the same time, the Vigoreaux family opened a studio, which they named Estudio CVC. They were also responsible for the transmission of the MDA television marathon in Puerto Rico.

He later worked for Channel 11, then named the Perez-Perry Network. He bought the Teatro Nuevo San Juan, from where he started transmitting his new show. But this show was not as successful, and soon Vigoreaux found himself off the air. In 1980, Vigoreaux went back to WAPA-TV and all his shows were rescheduled. He also became the show host of that station's lunch hour variety show, El Show Del Mediodia, and began playing the role of Pedro Navaja in a play La Verdadera Historia de Pedro Navaja. He would act in that play many times, as well as in a play named Angeles Caidos. In addition, he returned to the radio with a program named Buenos Dias, Puerto Rico, on radio station WBMJ-AM, Radio Rock, and worked, for a short period of time, as a television reporter for Noticentro 4. Vigoreaux was murdered on January 17, 1983. His wife, Lydia Echevarría, was convicted in 1986 as the intellectual author along collaborator David López Watts.

== Entertainment career ==
=== Early years ===
Vigoreaux was born on April 12, 1928, in the Chupacallos ward of Ceiba, Puerto Rico. He was one of the eight children of Eulalia Rivera and Enrique Vigoreaux, a sugarcane foreman for the Fajardo Sugar Company. He was one of ten siblings, with eight other brother and a sister, two of which died before him. His father died when he was young, forcing his mother to take charge of the family. Vigoreaux took charge of raising his brother Julio, who was one year and a half old. He began working as a gardener, developing a lifelong passion for the practice. Vigoreaux participated in his first theatre play while attending the Fajardo middle school, wearing a suit that was loaned by one of his teachers. There, Vigoreaux studied under Jorge A. Vázquez, whom he would homage in 1977. In the 1940s, the family moved from their house at Barrio Esperanza in Ceiba to Río Piedras in San Juan. Then 14 years old, he began attending the Vila Mayo High School. By this time, Vigoreaux worked in the warehouse of a shoe shop and as a mail sorter for the post office. He also began visiting the various radio stations found throughout the municipality. While attending the University of Puerto Rico (UPR), Vigoreaux met José Miguel Agrelot and Roberto Pérez Nazario, who was responsible for finding him the first opportunity to work as a presenter for radio.

=== Various roles in radio ===
In 1945, Vigoreaux began working in radio for WIAC, where he hosted Radio Amenidades con Luis Vigoreaux. He performed along the established Adela Villamil and Manuel Pérez Durán, appearing in radio telenovelas. He performed in a variety of roles, but mainly worked as an announcer He performed along the established Adela Villamil and Manuel Pérez Durán, appearing in radio telenovelas. In 1950, Vigoreaux served as the director for Radio Río. He worked along Adalberto Rodríguez (known by the stage name Machuchal) in La Taberna India, where his character of Meneíto gained popularity. Vigoreaux developed a recurrent role of the straight man in comedy, which he complimented with a well-groomed image and a mustache. On Saturdays, he joined Agrelot for Fiesta Infantil at WIAC and later WKAQ. Vigoreaux was invited as a guest to a wide range of events, including working as a fashion model once and throwing the first pitch in a baseball game. As an animator, he hosted events for a variety of political events, such as the 90th anniversary of Antonio R. Barceló.

Beginning in November 1948, Vigoreaux participated in Cartas y Canciones de Amor, which was transmitted in a 7:30 p.m. nighttime slot by WIAC. In November 1949, he served as master of ceremonies when Río Piedras-based WRIO 1140 debuted as a station under the name La Nueva Borinquen. In January 1950, Vigoreaux hosted a social activity for the Instituto Comercial de Puerto Rico, beginning a role that would accompany him throughout his career. The following month, he began working as the animator in WIAC's El Secreto Cortal transmitted from Teatro Matienzo. During this time, Vigoreaux also hosted showings of Rope of Sand (1949) at the venue. During this time, he also hosted artistic shows at Teatro Broadway. In May 1950, Vigoreaux hosted the premiere of the color films Mariachis, El Padre Desconocido and El Gran Calavera at the venue. He also participated in a homage to Alicia de Córdova where he joined several other artists. As part of El colegio de la Alegría Vigoreaux made appearances both in radio and other locales, such as the San Patricio Hospital. He also joined the group at Gran Fiesta India held at Parque Sixto Escobar. In El Chiste, El Verso y la Canción he joined Agrelot and Esther Palés that aired on a 2:45 afternoon slot at WIAC. Vigoreaux also joined the cast in El Tren de la Alegría.

Vigoreaux replaced Rey Arenas as the narrator of Los Villalobos. He then joined the crew of El colegio de la Alegría in a lirical evening event held by the Colonia Hispanoamericana de Bayamón. Vigoreaux received positive reviews for his work along Agrelot in Banco de la Alegría, which was aired by WKAQ in a Tuesday 8:00 p.m. nighttime slot. In January 1952, Vigoreaux participated in a dramatization of the life of baseball player Hiram Bithorn. He also joined Agrelot on hosting a salesmen reunion for Colgate held at Hotel Condado. During this time, he became known for being an "all around" radio celebrity with singing talent capable of competently imitating Daniel Santos. However, Vigoreaux was most involved with WKAQ's radio novelas such as En la cumbre de los Santos, Un amor frente al destino, Yo destrocé mi hogar and Leonardo Moncada. In the former, he replaced Ulises Brenes as Antonio when he traveled abroad. On July 4, 1952, he joined Agrelot and Felipe Rodríguez for an event held at Coamo Springs. Beginning this month, Vigoreaux also teamed with Agrelot for WKAQ's Jell-O Jackpot at Teatro Lorraine. By September 1952, it was noted as a popular show.

In Despertar Colgate, Vigoreaux and Agrelot debuted a sketch where they would perform a bomba. That month, Vigoreaux was also part of Cobian's Desfile de Estrellas! (Stars on Parade), which purported to be the biggest ensemble of artists up to that date. He was oart of the cast of WKAQ's prime time show Torito & Company, which debuted on September 15, 1952. He was given the character of "Don Toribio". This ran in parallel to Variedades and Jello-O Jackpot, where Vigoreaux and Agrelot continued active. He also provided the music for the station's western-themed noon show, Los Jinetes de la Muerte. In December 1952, the duo joined several other artists visiting municipalities that were celebrating their Fiestas Patronales and offering free shows. However, Vigoreaux and Agrelot had to interrupt their participation after contracting mumps. On February 2, 1953, the duo debuted in WKAQ's El Gran Show de la Mañana. In April 1953, Vigoreaux and Agrelot were part of the Gran Maratón Pro-Liga Puertorriqueña Contra el Cáncer, a radio marathon for cancer research and treatment. The duo joined WKAQ's new morning show, Rompiendo el Día con De Todo, which debuted on July 6, 1953. The Gran Show de la Mañana continued airing at 11:05. Vigoreaux was tasked with providing music and sound effects to WKAQ's first daybreak radio novel, Una Mujer ante la Vida, which began airing on August 7, 1953.

In August 1953, the duo participated in a campaign organized by the LPCC to create the Monchito Sepúlveda Fund. That month they also debuted in WKAQ's Desfile Juvenil. They continued involved with the municipalities, hosting their Fiestas Patronales. In November 1953, Vigoreaux served as the master of ceremonies of a homage held by the Club Fajardeño for Felisa Rincón de Gautier. Vigoreaux and Agrelot also collaborated with El Pueblo del Niño, a non-profit that benefited children. During the winter, the duo performed in various Christmas shows in places like the Colegio de Ingenieros and Teatro Puerto Rico. Vigoreaux and Agrelot were also a featured act at Club Social Las 3 Palmas. By February 1954, Vigoreaux served as the animator of WKAQ's late night weekend show La Música Preferida para su Baile. The duo also continued making regular theatre appearances, including the event held by Cobian's to honor Pepe Reyes.

=== First years of television ===
Vigoreaux made a crossover into television, initially in a recurrent role as a narrator for Telemundo among other appearances. He also worked as master of ceremonies for El Sensacional Programa Libby's when it entered simulcast in both radio and television. Along Agrelot, Vigoreaux hosted Atando Cabos in Telemundo. In November 1954, the duo traveled to New York and headlined shows at Teatro Boricua. Upon returning to Puerto Rico, Vigoreaux was given the role of animator for the Sunday program El Show Philco. The duo was also continued making theatrical appearances in the Cobian's chain. Following a hiatus caused by a surgery, Vigoreaux performed in his first non-comedic role in the El Gran Teatro play El Sol en la Sombra. He also hosted WKAQ's Radio Reloj news show. Vigoreaux continued working with El Gran Teatro, participating in an adaptation of The Three Musketeers written by Emilio Huyke. In April 1955, he joined Dramas Malta India, participating in Myrta Silva's acting debut in the sketch "Cero Dinero". In May 1955, Vigoreaux served as master of ceremonies when the Luis Muñoz Marín International Airport was inaugurated. During this time she received an acting Certificate of Honor from the Grupo de Autores de Dramas de Televisión de Puerto Rico. In July 1955, he began working as an announcer in the sports show El Hit Chesterfield. That month, Vigoreaux also performed the role of Juan B. Hyuke in El Hombre: Luis Muñoz Rivera. In August 1955, Vigoreaux served as both producer and host of a variety show.

In November 1955, Vigoreaux and Agrelot returned to New York for a season at the Teatro Puerto Rico. Upon returning to Puerto Rico, the duo appeared in Christmas-themed and charity events. Vigoreaux continued active in artistic shows, making appearances for the Cobian's chain and acting in Arthur Miller's La Muerte de un Vejigante. He also served as the presenter of the anniversary show of Teatro Carmen at Bayamón. Vigoreaux was included in the comedy Inocencio el Detective starting opposite Frank Arredondo. He also joined Agrelot in charity for the Sociedad Pro Bienestar De Niños Con Parálisis Cerebral, a non-profit that helped patients with cerebral palsy. Throughout the year, Vigoreaux served as presenter in a variety of assorted events including WKAQ's coverage of the 1956 general elections, the annual assembly of the Puerto Rico Police Cooperative Member's Association and the presentation of Los Chavales de España at Teatro Metropolitan. In December 1956, Vigoreaux participated in a radio-marathon to raise funds for Christmas presents.

Vigoreaux also collaborated with the Liga Contra el Cáncer, animating an event in the Caribe Hilton. In November 1957, he served as animator in a late morning show Cortijo y su Combo, featuring that musical group led by singer Ismael Rivera. Vigoreaux and Agrelot joined several artists in headlining WKAQ's 35th anniversary show. He participated in several events for the Puerto Rico Police and served as musical coordinator and animator for its band. In November 1958, Vigoreaux began serving as the master of ceremonies of WKAQ's Festival Sultana. He was part of Gran Show del Corazón, a special show to benefit the Asociación Puertorriqueña Para Combatir las Enfermedades del Corazón, a non-profit serving heart disease patients. Vigoreaux also hosted Telemundo's musical show featuring Nicanor Zabaleta. In March 1959, he joined WKAQ's radio novel Flor Salvaje as musical director. In July 1959, Vigoreaux was cast as "Roberto del Valle" in Francisco de Arriví's drama play Sirena, where he coincided with Lydia Echevarría. Beginning in September 1959, he joined Manuel Pérez Durán in WKAQ's news show Internacionales de Prensa Unida. The following month Vigoreaux joined another debuting program for Telemundo, Lluvia de Pesos, a variety game show.

=== Working with Echevarría ===
In 1960, Vigoreaux returned to help the APCEC by participating in the Domingo de Corazones event. In April 1960, Vigoreaux was scheduled to appear in Cielo Caído, but withdrew after Echevarría had creative disagreements with the director. Ultimately, the couple attended the debut of the play at Teatro Tapia. The following month he was part of the supporting cast in a Pedro Vargas Mother's Day show. In August 1960, Vigoreaux hosted the Telemundo prime time Saturday show La Hora Cero, where Agrelot rejoined him. At WKAQ, he animated the noon show Fiesta Musical del Mediodía. Vigoreaux and Lydia Echevarría were involved with the play El Avaro, which was part of the Festival Puertorriqueño de Teatro Universal. He participated in an event organized to help boxer Francisco Colón García raise funds to rebuild his restaurant business. Vigoreaux was the musical director of the WKAQ radio novel Una Luz en el Camino, which starred Echevarría. In November 1960, Vigoreaux was again tasked with covering the general elections. That month he also began working as musical director of the station's adaptation of the Nora Badia novel La Cautiva de la Torre Blanca. Vigoreaux also continued active outside media, animating private events.

In July 1961, Vigoreaux joined the cast of Delito en Isla de Cabras presented by the Compañía Arte Teatral de Puerto Rico at Teatro Tapia. In October 1961, the radio novel El Derecho a la Felicidad debuted in WKAQ starring Echevarría and with Vigoreaux as its musical producer. Vigoreaux was part of the cast of the film Romance en Puerto Rico. In March 1962, WKAQ debuted the novel Corona de Lágrimas, once agains starring Echevarría with Vigoreaux as musical director. By August 1962, Vigoreaux had also joined Producciones Paquito Cordero at WKBM-TV and was serving as presenter of the Show de las 9, while also continuing to work with Telemundo in Gran Show Libby's. He joined Ramón Olivencia as presenters of WKAQ's 40th anniversary show. Vigoreaux also starred in the film El Flamboyán Azul. In February 1963, WKAQ debuted the novel El Cobarde, once again starring Echevarría and with the musical direction of Vigoreaux. When actress Miriam Colóm returned to Hollywood in April 1963, Vigoreaux and Echevarría participated in a farewell party. In May 1963, Vigoreaux and Echevarría acted together in La Hora Cero.

On June 24, 1963, he served as a carnival contest judge at the Festival San Juan Bautista, which was sponsored by the governor. In August 1963, Vigoreaux musicalized the radio novel Frente al Odio, starring Echevarría. He was tasked with promoting the charity showings of Elizabeth Taylor's Cleopatra (1963). By October 1963, he was also hosting WAPA-TV's Luis Vigoreaux Presenta in addition to his Telemundo programs, in particular El Gran Show Libby's. He also made appearances in WUNO. When the Federación de Músicos de Puerto Rico celebrated its 25th anniversary, they homaged Vigoreaux, Tommy Muñiz and others that provided musicians the opportunity to appear in live shows. Vigoreaux was part of the cast of Lamento Borincano, a film released in November 1963. In December 1963, the couple resumed their recurrent roles in WKAQ's radio novel ¡Frente al pasado que acusa!.

In January 1964, Vigoreaux and Echevarría co-presented the Galas de París fashion show at San Juan, the former in Spanish and the latter in English. Vigoreaux joined dozens of artists in an event held at Sixto Escobar Stadium in benefit of the Asociación Pro Rehabilitación de Adictos, a non-profit that aided drug addicts. The couple also helped the Sociedad Pro Niños y Adultos Lisiados raise funds for the disabled. Vigoreaux was part of the cast of Juicio a un Ángel (1964). In August 8, 1964, Vigoreaux joined the cast of Emilio E. Huyke's comedy play Cuando él es Guadalupe. He was chosen as presenter of Cariberama '65, a music festival that aired concurrently on WAPA-TV, WOLE-TV and WSUR-TV. Vigoreaux closed the year with a homage to Rubén Gómez. Vigoreaux was also involved with La Taberna India and El Colmadito Paran Pan Pan, also creating the character Meneíto Me. In January 1965, Vigoreaux musicalized Mi Secreto, another WKAQ radio novel starring Echevarría. Both Vigoreaux and Echevarría were finalists for the Yunque de Oro, awards given to the most popular artists in Puerto Rican media. He was selected along Olga Choréns, Tony Álvarez and Vilma Carbia. The couple sponsored a ball dance and a caravan in benefit of the SANL. In October 1965, Vigoreaux was featured in the Feria Musical del '65 event at Parque Sixto Escobar. In January 1966, Vigoreaux organized a dance for governor Salvador Sánchez Vilella. The following month, he participated in a homage for Tommy Muñiz held by Club Caborrojeño. In June 1966, Vigoreaux performed along Ruth Fernández in a charity event for the SPNAL. During the summer, Vigoreaux joined Fernández and Vikki Valentine in a show for the benefit of the SANL. He joined Agrelot and Mariano Artau in narrating the opening ceremony of the 1966 Central American and Caribbean Games for Telemundo.

In September 1966, Vigoreaux joined the debuting Radio Luz station. When Cuando él es… Guadalupe made a return at Miramar, he reprised his previous role. Vigoreaux was selected as the presenter of the Nueva Ola show at Hiram Bithorn Stadium, where several artists of the genre performed before a young crowd. As he continued hosting Luis Vigoreaux Presenta, groups and artists debuted in the show. In May 1967, the couple participated in the Lion's Club District Convention. During this time, the municipality of Fajardo organized a homage to several artists native to the town, including Vigoreaux. The following month, Club Caborrojeño organized a homage for him and Agrelot. He was also involved with tourism events, including sponsoring travel packs to the 1967 World Series at St. Louis. In August 1967, Vigoreaux and Echevarría starred in WAPA-TV's comedy show Diario a un Hijo por Nacer. The couple sponsored the Club Mirabelle at Isla Verde, where they were noted to enjoy the art collection hosted at its gallery. In November 1967, Vigoreaux joined Roberto Clemente and Agrelot in a charity event that gifted turkeys at Puerta de Tierra. This trend continued when he was part of WKAQ's radio marathon to raise funds for the Liga Puertorriqueña Contra el Cáncer. In December 1967, Vigoreaux formed part of the Holiday special Criada a la Orden.

On Wednesdays, Vigoreaux hosted the musical program Carrousel for WAPA-TV. In February 1968, the Liga Contra el Cáncer announced Vigoreaux and Echevarrías their marketing campaign representatives for the year. He was a finalist for the Rafael Hernández Artistic Catalyst of the Year at the 1967-68 Festival de Popularidad. In May 1968, Vigoreaux joined Luis Antonio Rivera in hosting a marathon for the APNAL. During the summer of 1968, Luis Vigoreaux Presenta was moved to the Tuesday prime time slot. During this time, he also hosted events for the government in agencies such as Administración de Fomento Industrial and sports events. For WAPA-TV, Vigoreaux also headlined the Saturday show Sábado de Estrellas. For the station, he also narrated the coverage of the 1968 general elections. Vigoreaux also participated in events for the cooperative movement, including the 1968 Festival Cooperativista. In September 1968, Vigoreaux argued that while color television was "very pretty", it was prejudicial to producers by rising costs. Despite this, he also noted that international company Screen Gems had approached him to distribute Luis Vigoreaux Presenta abroad.

During the fall, Banco Popular de Puerto Rico contracted him for the first edition of his annual special. Vigoreaux was part of the jury in the Miss Cooperativismo 1968 beauty pageant. He was tasked with organizing the entertainment section of the event to benefit the LPCC. WUNO aired El Show de Luis Vigoreaux as part of its morning music block. In November 1968, Vigoreaux joined Agrelot in Saludos desde Puerto Rico, a show produced for WAPA-TV in New York. In January 1969, Vigoreaux received the Rafael Quiñones Borrás Award for Best Announcer of the Year. Luis Vigoreaux Presenta won the 1968 Best Variety Show Award at Festival Codazos. The events for which he was contracted to perform outside media were varied and ranged from corporate, to sports and civilian. In February 1969, Vigoreaux hosted Cervecería India's Sales Convention. He was also contracted to advertise the Alma Blanca rum brand.

Vigoreaux, Mariano Angelet and Bob Carpenter formed Corporación AVC, which was contracted by the Liga Atlética Interuniversitaria (LAI) to transmit its events. The couple once again placed among the most popular artists of Puerto Rico during the spring of 1969, being included among the voting of the Festival de Popularidad. Vigoreaux joined Mariano Angelet, William Carpenter, William de la Cruz, Manuel Rivera Morales and others in forming AVC TV Productions, which debuted with the transmission of the 1969 Las Justas. In April 1969, Vigoreaux began hosting the Celebrity Nights at the San Gerónimo Hilton. In June 1969, he received a recognition from Casa de España at San Juan. In September 1969, Vigoreaux served as master of ceremonies of the Reina de la Fragancia beauty pageant. In December 1969, Vigoreaux received the Presenter of the Year award at Festival Codazos. Vigoreaux was involved in the production of El Show Olímpico de Puerto Rico, a musical event held at tye Hiram Bithorn Stadium to raise funds for the Puerto Rico Olympic Committee (COPUR). With the inauguration of the El Comandante hippodrome, Vigoreuax was contracted to handle its advertisements.During the 1970s, Vigoreaux participated in the comedy El gran parador for WKAQ-TV.

=== Entertainment production ===
By the 1970s, Produciones Vigoreaux was responsible for five shows, which were produced by Vigoreaux along a staff that included Echevarría on both the on-camera content and the contractual aspect of the business. In April 1970, Vigoreaux and Echevarría served as co-presenters at the Caribe Hilton. Vigoreaux was among the artists that organized a fund raising tele-marathon for the victims of the 1970 Ancash earthquake. In August 1970, he joined a committee formed to help Marisol Maralet build a house following her Miss Universe win. By this time, Luis Vigoreaux Presenta was regarded as "the first program of television in Puerto Rico". In September, Vigoreaux hosted a gala to benefit the MDA. For WAPA-TV, Vigoreaux hosted the Friday show Sube, Nene, Sube. The couple was invited to Metro Goldwyn Meyer's (MGM) debut gala of David Lean's Ryan's Daughter (1970) for the Latin American market. For the 1970 Festival Codazos, Vigoreaux was nominated for the "Caballero de la Televisión" and Echevarría for the "Dama de la Televisión" categories, both representing the main awards in their respective branches. In December 1970, Luis Vigoreaux Presenta recorded a rating of 18.1, which placed it in the sixth place among local programming. Vigoreaux and Echevarría also co-won the 1970 Agüeybaná Award for "most elegant artist in television".

In January 1971, the couple participated in a homage for Tony Pérez by the Cangrejeros de Santurce, for which Vigoreaux was a member of the organizing committee. Vigoreaux acted as the animator of WAPA-TV's Tuesday prime time show La Cosa se Pone Buena. He also hosted the Concurso de Periodismo for the Overseas Press Club. In February 1971, the COPUR gave Vigoreaux a recognition for his collaboration with sports at the annual Olympic Dinner. At the 7th Festival de Popularidad, Vigoreaux won the Best Male Television Presenter award. In August 1971, Vigoreaux also collaborated with Hotel San Juan in a beauty show, providing an artist show. In November 1971, Vigoreaux was featured in WIPR-TV's Arte y Artistas. During the winter, Vigoreaux once again collaborated with the Cangrejeros in organizing a homage, this time to pitcher Juan Pizarro.

He continued active in an organizational role with the LPCC, sponsoring its events in late 1971. In January 1971, Vigoreaux hosted the event where Roberto Clemente received his Golden Glove award for the 1970 MLB season. The couple were guests in WIPR-TV's Sunday show Arte y Artistas. When the Gran Circo Panamericano visited Puerto Rico in 1972, Vigoreaux served as its master of ceremonies. In August 1972, Vigoreaux won an animation and production award at Miami's International Television Festival. During this time, he joined Agrelot, Cordero and other artists that formed a committee to coordinate a televised homage to entertainment magazine TeVe Guía. WAPA-TV once again selected him to host the 1972 general elections. As a producer, Vigoreaux expanded his scope to include the international entertainment scene and became the local representative of Kodak for 1973. In November 1972, Vigoreaux was joined by Frank Martinó and Guillermo José Torres as Puerto Rican representatives at the Congreso Internacional de Locutores. He became involved with Festival de la Canción y la Voz de Puerto Rico since its first edition was held during the fall of 1972. He was again nominated for the Caballero de la Televisión award at the Festival Codazos.

Following the 1972 Nicaragua earthquake, Roberto Clemente presided a committee that included Ruth Fernández and Vigoreaux and began a media campaign to gather supplies for the victims. The development proved pivotal for the baseball star player, when the airplane carrying the supplies and him crashed off San Juan, killing all aboard. Vigoreaux did not board the flight to attend a wedding. The committee was reorganized to include Héctor Modesti and Vera Cristina and continued gathering supplies. While continuing active in this role, Vigoreaux also attended a vigil in honor of Clemente. In February 1973, the Asociación de Ejecutivos de Ventas y Mercadeo de San Juan (AEVM) named him one of the "distinguished executives" of 1972. During this time, besides Luis Vigoreaux Presenta and Sube, Nene, Sube, he was also animating Pa' Arriba, Papi, Pa' Arriba. He continued active with the Asociación Puertorriqueña del Corazón by producing the artistic aspect of a fashion event to raise funds. As part of this campaign, Vigoreaux also hosted a tele-marathon that aired on Telemundo.

A group of announcers created the Asociación de Locutores de Puerto Rico (ALPRI) in May 1973, electing Vigoreaux as its first president. In April 1973, the College of America and the Universidad de los Pueblos de las Américas granted Vigoreaux an honoris causa doctorate in arts. During this month, the Hato Rey Lions Club also held a homage in his honor. He continued active in television, serving as presenter of Miss Puerto Rico Universe along Ana Santiesteban. For the 1973 Festival de Popularidad, Vigoreaux was nominated for the Yunque de Oro award. He became involved in helping raise funds for the Ciudad Deportiva Roberto Clemente project. In August 1973, Vigoreaux hosted the Puerto Rico transmission of the Jerry Lewis MDA Labor Day Telethon for WAPA-TV. Later that month, he served as a founding member of the Asociación de Productores Independientes de Televisión (APIT), of which he was selected vicepresident. When interviewed, Vigoreaux lobbied in favor of imposing stricter controls on the content aired on television and increase in the cultural level and promotion of Puerto Rican among the public figures featured. In October 1973, the municipality of Ceiba dedicated a basketball tournament in his honor. In December 1973, as starters of the 1973 Honda Christmas Rally. Vigoreaux and Echevarría were contracted to host the New Day's Eve special for WAPA-TV. In January 1974, the couple participated in the governor's personal Three Kings Day party. That month, Vigoreaux was also included in a commission organized by the Department of Instruction to vet the content of the government's radio and television stations.

After some time away from radio, Vigoreaux began pondering purchasing a station along two associates, despite admitting that his time was constrained. He expressed frustration on how the medium was being handled, considering that it lacked direction but retained the power to be "tremendously influential in Puerto Rico". Vigoreaux lamented in particular what he considered a decline in the writing for news programs. He collaborated with Cordero and Muñiz on the 1974 Telemaratón del Corazón for WKAQ-TV. In March 1974, Vigoreaux hosted a homage to composer Pedro Flores for the Senate of Puerto Rico. In April, Vigoreaux led the lobbying by the ALPR to create an examination board for the announcing profession. He helped the COPUR raise funds by narrating part of the collection Grandes Momentos del Deporte Puertorriqueño, which were used for the organization of the 1979 Pan American Games. Meanwhile, Luis Vigoreaux Presenta and Dale que Dale were among the most popular shows on Puerto Rican television, along Cordero's El Show de las 12.

In September 1974, Vigoreaux and Echevarría were among the presenters for the Jerry Lewis television-marathon that locally benefited the Asociación Contra la Distrofia Muscular. In October 1974, they participated at the premiere of That's Entertainment was held in benefit of the Liga Puertorriqueña Contra el Cáncer. In December 1974, Vigoreaux was invited to throw the ceremonial pitch of the Day of the Announcer to Fidel Cabrera in the professional winter league. He once again hosted the WAPA-TV New Year's Eve programming. Entering 1975, Vigoreaux's productions were among the most viewed in Puerto Rico. The New York-based Asociación de Cronistas granted Vigoreaux an award for "Best Variety Show". In April 1975, he returned to serve as master of ceremonies of Miss Puerto Rico along Santiesteban. Vigoreaux and Echevarría cohosted the 1975 Jerry Lewis-MDA tele-marathon for WAPA-TV. The following week, he hosted another for the non-profit Fondos Unidos de Puerto Rico, this one transmitted on WKAQ-TV. He was the Puerto Rican animator for the third Festival de la Canción y la Voz de Puerto Rico. When the 1976 Guatemala earthquake happened, Vigoreaux once again was part of a committee to gather aid, this one led by Luis Aponte Martínez. Vigoreaux and Santiesteban returned to host Miss Puerto Rico 1976. He repeated this role at Miss Maja International 1976. In June 1976, the government contracted him to host the Fiestas de Pueblo del Bicentenario. The couple was once again selected to co-host the 1976 Jerry Lewis-MDA television-marathon. Vigoreaux also hosted an Iris Chacón show held at the Condado Convention Center in Santurce. In October 1976, he was selected as part of the Asociación Pro Defensa de la Libre Empresa's board of directors. For this year's edition of the Festival de la Canción y la Voz, Vigoreaux joined Velda González as co-presenters. In November 1976, he rejoined Agrelot in a homage to Rafael Quiñones Vidal at the Roberto Clemente Coliseum. The couple returned to host the 1976 New Year's show for WAPA-TV.

In January 1977, Vigoreaux approached the Institute of Puerto Rican Culture (ICP) about the status of radio diffusion and the lack of properly trained figures in it, citing his concern over an absence of education for students that aspired to join the industry. In April 1977, Vigoreaux resumed his participation as presenter of Miss Puerto Rico. The couple returned to co-host the Jerry Lewis-MDA tele-marathon for a fourth straight year. In June 1977, Vigoreaux and Echevarría announced an annual grant to be awarded to artists. Vigoreaux served as one of the presenters of a tele-marathon held by the Puerto Rico chapter of the Red Cross. On October 28, 1977, Vigoreaux hosted a Star Wars-themed Halloween party for the Condado Beach and La Concha hotels. In November 1977, he was part of a homage held by the APCA to composer of En mi Viejo San Juan Noel Estrada, which gathered several artists at the Roberto Clemente Coliseum. In December 1977, he served as master of ceremonies for the Trofeo Gran Dama award ceremony for Felisa Rincón. Vigoreaux finished the year in another New Year's Eve show for WAPA-TV. In March 1978, he produced Onix Báez play María Magdalena… Pecadora y la Pasión de Jesús de Nazareth staged at the Roberto Clemente Coliseum. Later that month, Vigoreaux brought the Circo Panamericano to San Juan, in which the Wallenda family decided to perform despite the death of Karl Wallenda in a stunt that went wrong five hours earlier. He served as the sole master of ceremonies for Miss Puerto Rico 1978. In May 1978, Vigoreaux received a Diplo Award.

In the 1978 Jerry Lewis-MDA tele-marathon, Vigoreaux and Echevarría were joined by Joaquín Monserrat as presenters. In December 1978, Vigoreaux and Echevarría produced the television special Luis Vigoreaux Presenta Desde México. In January 1979, Vigoreaux revealed that he was working on a television series about Roberto Cofresí. In March 1976, Vigoreaux and Echevarría recorded a special program celebrating the 25th year of Agrelot's career. For Miss Puerto Rico 1979 he was joined by Erik Estrada. In April 1979, Vigoreaux produced the Manuel G. Piñera's Requiem para una madre starring Echevarría. In July 1979, the couple acted in an adaptation of Enrique Jardiel Porcella's comedy A las seis en la esquina del Boulevard. In August 1979, Vigoreaux began airing his programming on WKVM. Later that month, he inaugurated his theatre at Santurce, Teatro CVC. In October 1979, Vigoreaux presented Le Grand Café, an event to raise funds for the Puerto Rico Children's Hospital. CVC TV Productions collaborated with producers from Latin America, including Carlos Bas, to transmit its shows abroad.

=== Channel 11 and return to WAPA ===
Vigoreaux and his daughter Vanessa were part of the Artistas Cruz Azul, a softball team comprised by artists. Besides exporting Luis Vigoreaux Presenta, he also produced Cogiendo Impulso and Pa' Arriba, Nene, Pa' Arriba. Despite this, Vigoreaux continued as presenter of Miss Puerto Rico. In January 1980, Vigoreaux won the award for "Presenter of the Year" at Festival Codazos. In March 1980, he helped the ALPRI reactivate and select new directives by joining its advisory board. Vigoreaux, Echevarría and Pedro Zervigón were selected by the Sociedad de Niños y Adultos Lisiados de Puerto Rico as representatives for its 1980 public campaign, which included a special show titled Nuevos Horizontes. In June 1980, Vigoreaux hosted the television premier of Jacobo Morales' film Dios los Cría. He repeated as "Presenter of the Year" at the Diplo Awards. In October 1980, Vigoreaux hosted TeVe Guía's Festival de Telenovelas.

Vigoreaux returned to producing for WAPA-TV, while Echevarría signed as a telenovela actress with WKAQ-TV. This physical separation led to matrimonial issues and by February 1981, the matrimony was considering divorce. While Vigoreaux did not publicly comment on the matter, Echevarría denied responsibility and stated that she enjoyed acting more than presenting. The matter escalated when both held a reunion due to an unrelated matter that involved on of their daughters, during which both sides accused each other of physically assaulting the other. The incident continued when both moved to the building's parking and ultimately led to Echevarría pursuing charges for attempted murder against Vigoreaux, after she was expelled from his car and fell to the road. The case was taken to the San Juan Court, where he paid a bail of $5,000. While noting that the divorce was already underway, Vigoreaux stated that he had moved on and was seeing another woman. The producer later admitted that during the incident, he used the outdated practice of slapping Echevarría, claiming that she was "in a state of hysteria" and argued that she had hit him as well.

Vigoreaux did not appear in his programs in the timeframe immediately following this accusation and did not attend the scheduled preliminary hearing, citing health issues. He was defended by Joaquín Peña Peña, who also acted along Echevarría in WKAQ-TV's telenovela Viernes Social. The preliminary hearing was postponed three times and was ultimately postponed for January 1982. During the later stage of his career, his businesses were experiencing difficulties. Besides television, Vigoreaux continued active in radio by appearing in WBJM-AM's morning show Buenos días. In May 1981, Vigoreaux played the character of police chief Rafael McKenna in La Verdadera Historia de Pedro Navaja. In June 1981, WSTE-DT's El Show de Luis Vigoreaux recorded 11.8 rating points, being the 48th most watched show. In August 1981, he joined several artists in a posthumous homage to Ramón Rivero on the 25th anniversary of his death. The following month, Vigoreaux resumed his annual tole as animator of the Festival de la Voz y la Canción. In November 1981, he participated in an event where artists raised awareness against racism organized by the Concilio Puertorriqueño contra el Racismo.

In February 1982, Vigoreaux served as master of ceremonies for the Circo América. In May 1982, he hosted the Semana de la Danza Puertorriqueña event for the ICP. That same month, he received a recognition parchment by the Escuela Superior de Fajardo for his career. In November 1982, Vigoreaux joined the cast of Angeles Caídos, which was staged at Teatro Tapia until December. He also served as master of ceremonies in the induction ceremonies of the Fajardo Hall of Fame. Vigoreaux was diagnosed with cancer in the skeletal system, keeping the diagnosis private and undergoing treatment in Puerto Rico and abroad. He switched a $300,000 life insurance from Echevarría to Castillo. Vigoreaux joined the game announcing staff for the Cangrejeros for the 1982-83 season. During this time, he began making arrangements to marry his new girlfriend, Nydia Castillo, on February 14, 1983. During this time, Vigoreaux lived with his mother at Santurce and was frequently hosted by his son, Roberto, as well. He returned to Ceiba to participate in a party that celebrated the extended Christmas period known as Octavitas. In January 1985, Vigoreaux and Echevarría had agreed that he would use $40,000 to pay off the mortgage of the matrimonial house, which led to an agreement for mutual consent divorce. He expected to proceed with the marriage to Castillo and debut the program A millón, whose concept he expected to be a success that would overcome the economic difficulties of his enterprise.

== Murder and aftermath ==
On the morning of January 18, 1983, Vigoreaux didn't show up to work at the radio station or at WAPA-TV, causing his co-workers to worry. When his Mercedes-Benz was found with a burned body inside. It was taken to the medical examiner's office, where it was confirmed it was Vigoreaux. His death launched a wave of rumors and speculations and led to one of the most publicized trials in Puerto Rico's history. Echevarría, was accused formally of his murder, along David López-Watts. According to the prosecution, the actress had become jealous of the relationship Vigoreaux had started with actress Nydia Castillo, and had paid Newman and López-Watts to either beat him or murder him. Vigoreaux's body was found gagged, stabbed, and burned inside the car's trunk.

Echevarría maintained her innocence, but was convicted to a life sentence in Vega Alta, Puerto Rico. López Watts received a similar sentence. However, Echevarría and López-Watts only served roughly 12 years in jail. Newman received immunity from the Department of Justice of Puerto Rico to testify in court what happened the night of the murder and did not serve time in prison as an agreement. In January 2000, Governor Pedro Rosselló granted Echevarría a pardon, which was largely criticized by the people.

At the time of his death, Vigoreaux was about to begin another game show, A Millon, which eventually became one of the most popular shows in Puerto Rican television history, under the hosting of Hector Marcano and produced by Vigoreaux's son, Luisito Vigoreaux. His vigil was attended by hundreds, while the funeral procession where he was laid to rest at Cementerio Buxeda was attended by thousands including his family, artists, other public figures and the public at large. Castillo was not present, opting to remain away. On the second anniversary of his death, the government held a homage for Vigoreaux. A marathon was named after him. In April 1988, a bill was presented before the legislature to build a monument to Vigoreaux at Ceiba, with the support of the Institute of Puerto Rican Culture (ICP).

== Personal life ==
On June 2, 1950, Vigoreaux married Rosaura Lorenzana. In July 1951, the couple had its first son, who was named Luis Antonio, who quickly gained the nickname "Luisito". During this time, the family lived at Calle Barcelona in Santurce. In November 1952, Vigoreaux and Lorenzana moved to the adjacent Calle Villamil 103. Later, they also owned a house at Calle Los Iglesias at Parada 22. On December 23, 1952, the couple had its second child, Jorge Enrique. In January 1956, their third son, Roberto, was born. In 1962, Jorge Enrique died of leukemia at the age of nine. His mother Eladia Rivera believed that of his children, Roberto took after his father.

In December 1958, Rosaura Lorenzana filed for divorce from Vigoreaux at the San Juan Superior Court, also requesting an alimony of $355. During the process, their house (valued at $27,000) and other assets including vehicles were divided. The cause for divorce was stated to be abandonment, which judge Almodóvar Acevedo decided on March 13, 1960, granting her the custody of the children and imposing child support of $350 per month. In February 1961, Vigoreaux requested a reduction in the amount, citing an increase in responsibilities. The following month, the amount was adjusted to $300 by judge Rafael Idrach. In April 1961, Lorenzana requested an increase in child support, with Vigoreaux's monthly income becoming a topic of contention. In the December 1960 edition of La Hora Cero, Vigoreaux brought his brother after more than a decade of estrangement.

In 1958, Vigoreaux met actress Lydia Echevarría and they later worked together in the radio show La Hora Cero. They began their relationship after both divorced and had three children from their respective matrimonies. According to the latter, they felt in love on a personal level that had nothing to do with their artistic careers. They married on February 10, 1960. In May 1964, the couple welcomed their first daughter, Glendalys. Their second child, Vanessa, was born in July 1965 at Hospital El Maestro in San Juan. Vigoreaux and Echevarría initially lived at Calle O'Neill No. 153 in Hato Rey, San Juan. In October 1971, the family relocated to a mansion. There, they hosted a Christmas party in 1971 that included politicians, president of the Federación de Músicos Abraham Peña, the director of the Chamber of Commerce Francisco Buxó, among other influential figures of the time. Glendalys died by suicide on July 15, 2008.

According to Nydia Castillo, it was while both worked at the CVC TV Productions theatre in 1980 that they became romantically involved, with him pursuing something more serious. Initially, her parents opposed the union, but later accepted it. Following the separation in April 1981, Vigoreaux began living at an apartment in Dorado. Vigoreaux spent much of 1981 unemployed, time that he used to spend with Castillo.

=== Hobbies and social activities ===
Vigoreaux was conscious about male fashion, observing that it had undergone a revolution of sorts by the 1970s, adapting to the tropical climate of the Caribbean. As with other celebrities of the time, Vigoreaux frequently partook in tobacco, expressing a preference for cigarettes over cigars due to being "less offensive to women" and believing that "young people look ridiculous" while smoking cigars. He was involved with the Phi Delta Gamma fraternity. Vigoreaux was heping with helping several artists, including singer Gilberto Monroig when he was arrested on drug charges, by paying part of his bond. Wilson Ronda listed him among the people that helped launch his artistic career. He also translated Love is Blue to Spanish.

Vigoreaux and Echevarría became known for attending theatre plays and other social gatherings, such as the debut of Liza Minnelli at the Hotel San Juan. During the 1970s, the couple led the Asociación Pro Hospital del Niño, which benefited the Puerto Rico Children's Hospital. Vigoreaux was a member of the Variety Club of Puerto Rico, which also included Cordero and Telemundo General Manager Bilín Ruiz, among others. Among other events, he acted as its master of ceremonies at cocktail parties. By 1972, Vigoreaux had been selected the president of the Variety Club and continued coordinating with non-profit organizations. Under his incumbency, the group funded a pediatric emergency room for the Ashford Memorial Presbyterian Hospital at Santurce. The Club also donated an incubator to the Hospital Municipal de San Juan. In January 1974, the Ashford Memorial Hospital held a homage to Vigoreaux for his contributions to the pediatric department.

In 1971, Vigoreaux joined the Confrérie de la Chaîne des Rôtisseurs, later hosting events for its local chapter. In April 1972, Vigoreaux was invited and joined The International Wine & Food Society. In November 1972, he joined Jimmy Harrington in hosting the annual convention of the Chaine de Rottisseurs de Puerto Rico, entertaining the gourmands in a Rome-themed artistic event. In May 1973, Vigoreaux and Echevarría took part in the Chaine de Rotisseurs's gala banquet at the Fortín San Gerónimo.

=== Involvement with syndicalism ===
In January 1961, Vigoreaux and Echevarría picketed along the Asociación Puertorriqueña de Artistas y Técnicos del Espectáculo (APATE) when director Barry B. Yellen refused to cast local artists in the San Juan Drama Festival, for which both were arrested. Judge Roberto Veray Torregrosa found them, along a group of 43 other artists, not guilty of illegal assembly. He was a leader in protests and joined Agrelot and other union artists filed an injuction before the San Juan Superior Court requesting that WKAQ stopped airing pre-recorded shows while the union was on strike. In July 1963, Producciones Vigoreaux and the APATE clashed when he tried to contract a foreign actor instead of one of the union's clients. He organized Producciones Luis Vigoreaux, which received an award by the union for its media involvement. In May 1968, Vigoreaux was among a group of APATE-affiliated artists that opposed a boycott to the Festival de Teatro Puertorriqueño. In July 1970, Vigoreaux broke with the APATE and supported the newly-formed Unión Puertorriqueña de Artistas (UPA). He served as master of ceremonies for Espectáculo '70, an event held by the UPA at the Hiram Bithorn Stadium, which the syndicate expected "to foster the union among artists". In August 1974, Vigoreaux criticized some of the stances of the artistic class, for which the APATE noted that it would consider legal action.

=== Personal beliefs and ideology ===
Vigoreaux considered himself "an artists first" and, as such, primordially an animator. However, he considered that producing was a far bigger challenge that required more of him. He was wifely critical of people that he considered "lacking in professionalism" with the entertainment industry, in particular those that he felt were in it for the money and not the creative side. Despite participating in some local films, Vigoreaux felt that there was no established film industry during the 1970s and expected more government support to change that. Vigoreaux had a pacifist ideology that led to him opposing violence in television, being especially critical of programming directed toward children like Popeye and Tom and Jerry. He also lobbied in favor of strictly controlling pornography to only allow artistic nudity in television. His conservative stances extended into homosexuality, which he opposed "on moral grounds" and favored that gay relationships remained obscured from public view and illegal. Despite these stances, Vigoreaux favored the widespread legalization of drugs, which he considered would end trafficking. He also opposed legally prohibiting the announcement of alcoholic beverages in local programming when it was proposed.

Politically, Vigoreaux and Echevarría were affiliated to the Popular Democratic Party of Puerto Rico (PPD), actively helping it raise funds and performing in its events. Vigoreaux and Echevarría also hosted a recognition for then President of the Puerto Rico Senate Rafael Hernández Colón. After the legislator was elected governor, he was tasked with hosting the traditional Three Kings Day event at La Fortaleza. Later that year, Vigoreaux and Echevarría named Hernández Colón an honorary member of the ALPRI, during the acts that opened the "Week of the Announcer". As a staunch popular, he considered the Commonwealth "a permanent solution" to the status of Puerto Rico and considered the ongoing debate detrimental to society on par with the costs of living. However, his stance was pro-Puerto Rican and when the local chapters of the Exchange Clubs gave precedence to the flag of the United States during their convention, he demanded that priority should always be given to the flag of Puerto Rico. He honed reading, gardening and agriculture as hobbies. Hernández Colón also contracted Vigoreaux to host events that bolstered his public policy, such as the ceremony where Unit 6 of Costa Sur was inaugurated. In 1976, Vigoreaux stated that he "had been reproached" due to his political leaning and noted his belief that artists shouldn't be apolitical since "nobody lives inside a glass bubble".

=== Litigation ===
When Danny Rivera and other musicians filed a lawsuit against the Federación de Músicos de Puerto Rico for ownership of their tracks, several producers among whom was Vigoreaux, Cordero, Tommy Muñiz and Elím Ortiz were also sued. In March 1975, he registered a corporation named Parque las Américas Inc. and signed a contract to develop a park at San Juan with Emilio Casellas, director of the Administración de Parques y Recreo Público. It raised criticism from various public figures including members of the legislature, due to extending into 2010 and reassigning public terrains, with an investigative commission being organized. Following public hearings and a lawsuit, the contract was legally annulled and Vigoreaux considered the topic a "dead matter". In May 1975, Vigoreaux sued José Granados Navedo claiming that the legislator had circulated a photo of him that was taken out of context with accompanying remarks that constituted defamation, but the San Juan Superior Court dismissed the action. In April 1980, WAPA-TV sued CVCTV for $52,945 after Pa' Arriba, Papi, Pa' Arriba was taken to another network.

== See also ==
- French immigration to Puerto Rico
- List of Puerto Ricans
- List of television presenters P.R.
