= Murder of Luis Vigoreaux =

Murder of television producer in 1983

- Location: 18.3444° N, 66.0528° W Sector Los Guanos, Cupey Bajo, San Juan, Puerto Rico
- Date: January 17, 1983 ≈ 8:00 p.m. (Atlantic Standard Time)
- Target: Luis Vigoreaux
- Attack type: Murder by immolation
- Weapons: Ice cutter, tire iron, gasoline canister
- Deaths: 1
- Victim: Luis Vigoreaux
- Assailants: Lydia Echevarría; David López Watts; Francisco Newman
- Motive: Divorce, jealousy
- Accused: Lydia Echevarría; David López Watts
- Charges: First degree (premeditated) murder, Aggravated kidnapping Conspiracy to commit murder
- Verdict: Guilty on all accounts
- Convictions: 208 years (Echevarría); 114 years (López Watts)
- Convicted: Lydia Echevarría; David López Watts
- Litigation: Pueblo v. Echevarría Rodríguez, 128 D.P.R. 299 (1991)
- Judge: Laura Nieves de Van Rhyn

On January 17, 1983, the charred remains of entertainment personality and businessman Luis Vigoreaux were found stuffed inside the trunk of his own car at an isolated sector of San Juan, Puerto Rico. The body was identified shortly afterwards following an autopsy, which determined that he had been stabbed and hit with a blunt object before being set ablaze and dying of smoke aspiration. In contemporary media, the murder was described as "a cold crime, planned in every detail [and] cruel." From the onset, Vigoreaux's estranged wife and actress Lydia Echevarría was accused as the intellectual author of the crime, with jealousy emerging as the prime motivator. The subsequent proceedings became known as El juicio del siglo (lit. "The Trial of the Century") in Puerto Rico. The clarification of the case was interrupted by false testimony, which led to an initial trial against Echevarría and four other accused that were exonerated when the unreliability of the witness was established in court.

A re-investigation led to a second trial, in which Echevarría was once again charged as the intellectual author (on charges of first-degree murder, aggravated kidnapping and conspiracy to commit murder) this time along a different co-accused named David López Watts and with the cooperation of another perpetrator, Francisco Newman. Besides new testimonies being included as evidence, the second stage also included an independent autopsy commissioned to an independent institution that corroborated the circumstances of Vigoreaux's death. The amount of coverage given to the case and the hypotheses that emerged was considerable, leading to arguments about sensationalism, conspiracy theories and false narratives. Due to this, the trial remains one of only a handful in which the jury has been sequestered in Puerto Rico.

In 1985, Echevarría and López Watts were found guilty on all charges based on letters authored by her and the testimony of Newman, who was given full immunity by the state. She was sentenced to 208 years in prison, while the co-accused received a 114-year sentence. The case was taken before the Supreme Court of Puerto Rico (PRSC) and extended until 1991, when the sentences were sustained. Ultimately, Echevarría only spent 13 years and six months in prison, with her sentence being commuted in 1999 by then-Governor of Puerto Rico Pedro Rosselló. On his part, López Watts completed 14 years of his sentence before being released. Of the group, only Echevarría remained active as a public figure for some time, resuming her career as an actress.

== Background ==
Luis Vigoreaux and Lydia Echevarría met while working in radio during the late 1950s and married on February 10, 1960. Afterwards, she would join him as a television co-host for WAPA-TV and collaborated in numerous projects in various media forms, including the management of a production house named Estudio CVC. Throughout 23 years of matrimony the couple worked together. After going independent, they moved to Telecadena Pérez Perry (WKBM-TV), but the move was a failure and placed the business and the family under economic strain, eventually bankrupting Estudio CVC. In 1981, Vigoreaux returned to producing for WAPA-TV, while Echevarría signed as a telenovela actress with WKAQ-TV. This physical separation led to matrimonial issues and by February 1981, the matrimony was considering divorce. While Vigoreaux did not publicly comment on the matter, Echevarría denied responsibility and stated that she enjoyed acting more than presenting. The matter escalated when both held a reunion due to an unrelated matter that involved on of their daughters, during which both sides accused each other of physically assaulting the other. The incident continued when both moved to the building's parking and ultimately led to Echevarría pursuing charges for attempted murder against Vigoreaux, after she was expelled from his car and fell to the road.

The case was taken to the San Juan Court, where he paid a bail of $5,000. While noting that the divorce was already underway, Vigoreaux stated that he had moved on and was seeing another woman. He later admitted that during the incident, he used the outdated practice of slapping Echevarría, claiming that she was "in a state of hysteria", but also argued that she had hit him as well. Vigoreaux did not appear in his programs in the timeframe immediately following this accusation and did not attend the scheduled preliminary hearing, citing health issues. He was defended by Joaquín Peña Peña, who also acted along Echevarría in WKAQ-TV's telenovela Viernes Social. The preliminary hearing was postponed three times and was ultimately postponed for January 1982.

In January 1983, Vigoreaux was living at Santurce in his mother's house, where his brother also resided. On the day of his murder, Vigoreaux performed live on the afternoon show at WAPA-TV, leaving the station at about 1:00 pm. He was last seen alive leaving a lawyer's office located at Condominio El Centro in Hato Rey. That day, Vigoreaux and Echevarría had been working on their divorce. She claimed that he had escorted her to the car and that she had left towards the Luis A. Ferré Performing Arts Center to participate in rehearsals for the play Los Soles Truncos. The proceedings were supposed to continue two days later, to complete the details of their mutual divorce agreement.

== Circumstances of the crime ==
=== Kidnapping and torture ===
The version of the events that was ultimately led to conviction stated that Echevarría first approached her friend and self-identified lover, model Francisco José Newman, to join her in a plot to murder Nydia Castillo out of jealousy. In turn, he brought López Watts to participate in the plot. In a reunion at her house, Echevarría agreed to pay Newman the sum of $25,000 and gave him a copy of the key to Vigoreaux's car. Following an incident in which Vanessa Vigoreaux confronted her father for intending to marry Castillo, a new reunion was held. It was here that the presenter was also added as a target of the conspiracy for the same amount. Newman testified that he had received Vigoreaux's own gun and an initial sum of $500, which he spent on drugs, from Echevarría herself. The duo stalked Castillo and Vigoreaux while they were shopping on January 17, 1983, but were unable to intercept them there because they didn't leave their car. Newman and López Watts continued following the presenter at a distance, as he travelled to Condominio El Centro and throughout various streets, Calle Mayagüez, Barbosa Avenue, 65th Infantry Regiment Avenue and the Trujillo Alto highway. It was there that the duo managed to intercept Vigoreaux, near Barrio Saint Just, while he waited on a red light. Newman used the copy of the key to enter the vehicle, pointed the gun at the presenter and forced him to continue onwards.

According to the witness, the presenter questioned if Echevarría was behind the kidnapping, but the blame was deflected towards Luis Antonio Cosme. Reaching a unfrequented sector known as Los Guanos in Caimito, Vigoreaux was ordered to exit the vehicle and tried to defend himself before being subdued. Watts stabbed the producer with an ice cutter that he had received from Newman, until he lost consciousness. The duo then stuffed Vigoreaux, still alive, into the trunk of his car. Newman conducted the vehicle through Puerto Rico Highway 181, while López Watts went to the house of his friend Marilyn Cintrón Brandes to retrieved a gas container and proceeded on his own to purchase gasoline from a nearby station. The duo drove to a farm and opened the trunk, noticing that Vigoreaux was still alive when he grabbed Newman while trying to steal a wrist watch, who used a lug wrench to hit him in the head twice and caused a severe fracture that left him unresponsive. After dousing the car with gasoline and igniting it, the duo left the scene and tried to contact Echevarría, instead reaching Vanessa Vigoreaux. Newman and López Watts then traveled to her house at El Pilar, Río Piedras, where they received the payment for the murder. From there, the duo left towards Old San Juan and into La Perla, where they purchased cocaine. Afterwards, Newman left on a plane towards New York, while Watts remained on the island. However, according to the state the duo bragged about their involvement in the crime, allowing them to be identified.

=== Discovery of the body and identification ===
Understanding the events between the moment he was last seen and when his was found represented the main puzzle for the police early on, due to its brevity (between 15 minutes and an hour) limiting the people that could have possibly interacted with Vigoreaux and the places he could have gone. His clock was found, with its hands stuck at 8:20. The crime scene lost key components of its context while the firefighters struggled to extinguish the flames. Vigoreaux was murdered between 8:00 and 9:00 p.m., as certified by forensic pathologist Rafael Criado. At 9:30 p.m. the discovery of a burned and abandoned Mercedes Benz 1977 car was reported at kilometer 4.1 of route 176 in Cupey, with a dead body its trunk. His body presented eleven puncture wounds, severe craniocerebral/parietal fractures and intracranial bleeding trauma and widespread hemorrhaging consistent with torture, as noted by Criado. These included a neck would affected the trachea and esophagus, five wounds were directly at the heart, four the lungs, another the kidney and another in the lower abdomen, which caused severe bleeding. The stabbing preceded the blow to the head with a blunt object, which was insufficient to cause immediate death, since the lungs presented evidence of inhaling carbon monoxide from the fire. The forensic pathologist also determined that the murder weapon was likely a stiletto and that Vigoreaux was stabbed while standing, before being thrown into the trunk.

The remains were too burned to recover fingerprints directly, so it was transported around 6:30 am to the Instituto de Ciencias Forenses (ICF) at Río Piedras. Personal documents, his wallet with identifications, clothes including an engraved buckle belt, a gold crucifix and groceries were found in the area. Aurelio Vigoreaux was called onto the scene for the identification of items found there and was informed that his brother's car was found on a crime scene, with the remains suspected to be his. The family provided the record of his dentures to forensic physician Aracelis Ortiz Velázquez, with his brother Julio Vigoreaux serving as its spokesperson. Identification of Vigoreaux was quick due to the shape of his jawline, which was necessary because a part of his dentures had been lost in the fire.

== Investigation ==
=== Initial mystery and dead ends ===
A dozen agents were assigned to the initial investigation on January 18, 1983. Though a suspect was not initially identified, a gasoline container and fingerprints from partes that weren't the victim were lifted from the scene of the crime. Police Bureau Superintendent Desiderio Cartagena tasked commander Ángel Collazo, Chief of the Cuerpo de Investigaciones Criminales (CIC), with focusing all of the resources available on solving the murder. Nydia Castillo, to whom Vigoreaux was engaged following his estrangement from Echevarría, was interviewed by the police on January 17, 1983. Within a week, the number of investigators assigned by the police to the case had risen to 20. However, the contradictions in their statements and those offered by the Superintendent to the press were noted.

Cartagena addressed the crime by confidently stating that it had to have been planned and expressed optimism in its solution, but at the moment the Bureau was considering 10 different angles. Part of a fingerprint was directly retrieved from the gas container and personal documents were retrieved from the offices owned by Roberto Vigoreaux. However, captain Sebastián Ortiz noted that the police had yet to interview Echevarría, but stated that she had been cooperating. An interview with the actress was arranged by the prosecution on January 28, 1983, but she was not considered a suspect during this stage. During this time, Colonel Juan E. Rivera had to publicly dismiss reports that the police was aware of the suspect's identity.

By February 1983, the CIC admitted that the investigation of the case was complicated by how many people interacted with Vigoreaux on a daily basis. The police acknowledge that despite interviewing more than 30 individuals nearly one month after the murder, it lacked concrete evidence or suspects, but complained about the amount of disinformation being fed to the media and the public. These Bureau also noted that it had been receiving calls from self-professed clairvoyants and other unenforceable informants that were being a hindrance on the investigation. Supervisor of the San Juan homicide unit, Jorge H. Muñiz Vázquez, dismissed these concerns and argued that investigations moved slowly and the case had progressed to some extent.

In May 1983, Cartagena dismissed rumors that there was a suspect that had escaped abroad, while the number of people questioned had risen to 80. In June 1983, prosecutors Pierre Vivoni and Crisanta Rodríguez were assigned to the case and began a new round by taking sworn testimonies from those previously interrogated. In July 1983, the police dismissed that a suspect had been apprehended. The following month, Crisanta Rodríguez vacated his role in the case by leaving public service for the private practice, as the investigation continued stalled.

=== First angles and theories ===
When the body of Jorge Nelson Soto Pérez, a 17-year-old that was identified as "a drug addict", was found close to the place where the car had been abandoned the police began considering him as a potential perpetrator. This responded to two anonymous calls placed to the Central Command and a police station at Trujillo Alto by a man and a woman, who accused him of murdering Vigoreaux and revealed the location of the body. Immediately questioning that he was killed during a mugging, his friend Juan Ortiz Jiménez emphasized that he did not use much jewelry and never carried cash with him, preferring to use credit/debit cards. A complaint claiming a breach on her peace and aggression that was filed by Nydia Castillo against Echavarría on the day of the murder gathered public interest, since it claimed that the actress visited her house in a confrontational state of mind at 5:45 p.m. and caused a disturbance.

In September 1983, prosecutors Pierre Vivoni and Gilberto Vilá Navarrete traveled to an undisclosed state to interview a convict that claimed to possess knowledge about the case. The attorneys credited the police and Puerto Rico Justice Department for the underlying investigation and confirmed that a relevant "clue" had been received. The following week, ten residents from Cupey were interviewed at the police headquarters, with the intent of corroborating the information and give weight to angles being worked. Superintendent Cartagena called these theories "solid ground" to build on a case. Another five individuals from Cupey and Río Piedras were brought to the police headquarters for questioning by the CIC. By November 1983, the prosecution extended the scope of its investigation to a neighboring Caribbean island, reported to be the Dominican Republic.

In January 1984, Vilá Navarrete confirmed that the department was investigating possible links between the murder of Vigoreaux and Alejo Maldonado, a former high ranking officer convicted of corruption and creating a vigilante "death squad". However, the prosecutor also admitted that one year into the investigation no concrete case had been built. Following a change in the superintendency, agents Ramón Colón and Jorge Muñiz were tasked with giving priority to the case under commander Alfredo Padilla. The case's was said to be housed in a folder that was six inches thick by this point, but the bureau keep the bulk of its theories to themselves, only revealing that they believed he was ambushed at Hato Rey.

In February 1984, the Justice Department announced that two witnesses had come forward and that the investigation had been reinvigorated. Six months later, House Speaker Colberg revealed that the police had all but finished the investigation on the murder and the preparation of the legal theory to be presented before the court. Until an alibi appeared, the police included the possibility that Vigoreaux had been tortured at the matrimonial house before being taken to Cupey. Prosecutor Vidalia Rivera García noted that the police was working the case as a conspiracy with at least five perpetrators and that they had reconstructed the 15 days prior to his death. At New York, they met with a Dominican national that was only identified as "Quinqui", who was said to have contracted two others to track the producer and to have been behind an attempt to burn Nydia Castillo's car.

=== First prosecutive legal theory ===
According to the account of the events offered by witness and former police lieutenant Julio César Andrade, Echevarría had contacted him about the possibility of killing Vigoreaux, but he declined and traveled elsewhere. Another source to come forward with a similar claim was Manuel Lecaroz Passarell. According to the main witness, Juan Orlando Sepúlveda, between January 15 and 16, Echevarría and bondsman Edgardo Vázquez Reyes visited the house of Pedro Guadalupe Aquino, where they made an offer to pay the family the sum of $25,000 in exchange for the murder, which would be paid as long as the presenter was tortured prior to being killed. The presenter was lured into the matrimony's former home, where he was intercepted by a white Cadillac car driven by Sepúlveda at 7:30, from which brothers Rubén and Jaime Guadalupe jumped him, took the red Mercedes Benz and both vehicles drove to Cupey. Either there or during the initial interaction, the duo was responsible for inflicting the stab wounds with a shoemaker's knife before finishing the torture by using a lead pipe to inflict a wound to the head that left him unconscious but alive, then stuffing him into the trunk of his car. The Guadalupes poured gasoline over the vehicle and lit it, leaving the scene. The were stated to have received about $100 each for the murder. However, Echevarría employed Rubén Guadalupe as a gardener and handy man after the crime.

=== Arrests and charges ===
Accusations were filed by the police's Special Investigation Bureau on September 2, 1984. The Department of Justice only identified bondsman Edgardo Vázquez Reyes, who was offered immunity in exchange for his cooperation (one of three such offers) but declined it, opting to argue in favor of his innocence. The Secretary noted that they would pursue charges against six individuals, including "a prominent figure", four of them actively participated in the murder. Two were reported to be related and also involved in the investigation of the murder of lawyer Néstor Márquez Díaz. WAPA-TV broke the news that Echevarría was the public figure being hinted. This caused a mob to gather outside the San Juan court, expecting her arrival. She was accused along four others, Vázquez Reyes, Pablo Guadalupe Nuñez, Pablo Guadalupe Aquino and Jorge Jaime Guadalupe, of first degree murder, aggravated kidnapping, conspiracy to commit murder and various violations of the Puerto Rico Weapons Act. Echevarría did not appear before court and was speculated to have left the jurisdiction, but was represented by her lawyer Eli B. Arroyo in the hearing where probable cause was established. Her bond was set at $600,000. Besides Andrade, Nitza Guadalupe Núñez testified against her brothers and the actress. The police monitored the movements of Echevarría for three before the accusations.

She was arrested in the house of a family member at University Gardens in Río Piedras and taken to the office of the Special Investigations Bureau on September 3, 1984, being incarcerated at the Guayama Correctional Center that night after failing to pay the bond. The actress tried to avoid being photographed by the media at all times. The police searched for Vanessa Vigoreaux, the youngest daughter of the couple, for questioning but she left Puerto Rico in a hurry. Echevarría pledged them to leave her out of the investigation. Two days later, Superior Judge Daniel López Pritchard lowered the bond amount to $56,800 at the request of attorneys Arroyo and Eugenio Ramos Ortiz and despite the protest of the prosecution who noted that she was a wealthy citizen. Vanessa Vigoreaux returned to Puerto Rico, but her involvement in the case was kept confidential by the police. On September 6, 1984, theater director Victoria Espinosa provided an alibi for the presence of Echevarría at the murder scene, citing that she had been at rehearsals that day. In response, the police brought in four new witnesses to support its theory and also interviewed Vanessa Vigoreaux. Weeks after the arrests, prosecutor Vidalia Rivera García was removed from the case by the agency.

=== Collapse of the first case ===
The preliminary hearing for Echevarría and the other accused took place on October 16, 1984, with 45 witnesses being preliminarily expected to testify including Nydia Castillo, Julio Vigoreaux, pathologist Criado and dentist Oscar Porrata Doria. Judge Antonio J. Negroni imposed a gag order on the parts concerning the proceedings. During the continuation of the preliminary hearing, Sepúlveda was brought as one of the key witnesses, but contradicted his previous sworn testimony regarding the origin of the murder weapon and who began the torture and what acts took place, with his statements being protested by the defense for also contradicting the autopsy report. The accused filed a motion for the proceedings to continue publicly which was denied by Negroni, gathering criticism from the press. The public hearing was suspended for a subsequent date while certiorari requests were attended by the Puerto Rico Supreme Court, by this point 16 of the 17 witnesses had testified. Ultimately, the court found cause to proceed to trial against Echevarría, who attended the accusation hearing on December 10, 1984. The trial was scheduled to begin on February 25, 1985.

In January 1985, Sepúlveda admitted in court that he had willingly lied in court about his knowledge of the case during the preliminary hearing for two of the other accused. Three of Echevarría's neighbors testified that they didn't hear anything that night, but ultimately key witness Nitza Guadalupe wasn't allowed to testify after the defense cited a forensic report that questioned her mental health. The cases against the elder Guadalupe and Vázquez Reyes were dropped and motions requesting the archive of the case against Echevarría due to the unreliable witness were presented before the San Juan superior court. The Department of Justice began an inquiry on the actions of the prosecution.

In February 1985, Echavarría impugned the use of Sepúlveda's testimony against her. Within days, the Secretary of Justice replaced the prosecution and ordered a new investigation of the murder. Secretary of Justice Rivera Cruz was cited to this hearing, with the judge criticizing on record his frequent public expressions on the case. The case against the defendants was scheduled to continue under judge Ygrí Rivera de Martínez, but the Puerto Rico Supreme Court paralyzed the proceedings on March 30, 1985. The prosecution requested the sworn testimony of Vanesaa Vigoreaux and Julia González, Echevarría's mother, which was protested by the defense. Vanessa Vigoreaux and Julia Rodríguez were interrogated, but the case stalled. In April 1985, Vázquez Reyes publicly claimed that Martínez Acosta had offered him $40,000 to testify against Echevarría, while the case against the Guadalupe brothers was dismissed in May 1985.

=== Second trial and sentencing ===
When the prosecution led by Luis A. Román completed its re-investigation of the murder, which included the interview of 40 individuals, a new accusation was levied against Echevarría. This one identified her as the intellectual author of the murder, which was perpetrated by the new co-defendant David López Watts. According to this version, Echevarría and López Watts also hatched a plot to murder Nydia Castillo as well. On April 14, 1985, judge Sylvia Ricardo found probable cause for the charges of murder in the first degree and conspiracy to commit murder, with a bond being set at $130,000. Vanessa Vigoreaux was also charged with contempt on the court. López Watts received a bond of $125,000. The actress and her daughter paid their bonds, but López Watts was unable to. The following day Francisco José Newman, a model and friend of Echevarría, was revealed as the Department of Justice's main witness and collaborator. Both co-conspirators were noted to have an intense addiction to cocaine, which motivated their need for the cash. Román has previously approached Watts as a possible collaborator, but he declined.

A delay in the archive of the first case involving Echevarría created an unprecedented legal situation that bordered on double jeopardy, where she was accused twice at once for the same crime but different facts. For this, the prosecution requested the archive of the original accusation without prejudice, which was granted by judge Ygrí Rivera de Martínez. The preliminary hearing began on June 3, 1985, with witness Leonardo Martín Fonseca testifying that Echevarría had tried to receive the insurance for the Mercedes Benz and Vázquez Reyes reappeared to declare that she had approached him to burn Castillo's car. The parallel case against Vanessa Vigoreaux was dismissed. The defense of Echevarría requested the police report and argued that the agent that first investigated the case had contradicted himself in court. The prosecution insisted on having a fingerprint lifted from the gas container and a burned wrist watch admitted as evidence. Newman was interrogated and reaffirmed the theory of the prosecution, also noting that Echevarría told him to wait for the insurance to come through to receive the rest of the payment. On July 30, 1985, judge Gloria Iagrossi Brenes found probable cause for the charges against both accused.

Prior to the trial, the prosecution cited 46 potential witnesses and handed the police report to the defense. The court also dismissed a motion requesting the dismissal of the case due to excessive publicity filed by Echevarría's lawyers. As the discovery continued and the beginning was set for January 1986, López Watts was released until then based on his Constitutional right to habeas corpus. The results of a second autopsy conducted by independent forensic investigators concluded that Vigoreaux had been murdered with a weapon compatible with an ice pick, which countered the defense's argument that Criado's first autopsy pointed towards a forked weapon of some sort. In the months leading to the trial, the court expressed discontent with the way in which the prosecution was doing the discovery and, while refusing to stop the proceedings, ordered an interrogation on the reasons behind the resistance to disclose. Meanwhile, the Supreme Court denied a resource by the Office of the General Procurator to push the date of the trial's beginning forward to November 1985, leaving it on January 20, 1986. Leading up to the trial, the prosecution unveiled Roberto Vigoreaux as one of its witnesses.

The trial began with over 60 witnesses announced and the selection of the jury. The judge imposed a gag order over the proceedings. The interrogation of the witnesses focused on a previous PI investigation that Echevarría had commissioned and the car insurance, proving contentious between both sides. Nydia Castillo testified that Echevarría had made death threats against both her and Vigoreaux and had visited her job, showing her a letter and trying to convince her to break up with the producer. The defense continued pursuing the disbandment of the jury and a mistrial, but were denied. Vázquez Reyes, Rafael Tirado and Newman reiterated their previous statements. Officer Ricardo Hernández testified that the evidence recovered from the scene had not been properly catalogued by the police. This began a new struggle over the evidence, when the prosecution brought pieces of bones and organic matter taken from the body, having Criado testify while examining them in court. Irvin C. Stone, who had performed the independent autopsy at Texas, testified that the murder weapon was an ice cutter. The defense changed hands when Eugenio Ramos took over after Galib left due to health concerns. A representative of Equitable Life, Mary Cuevas, testified that Echevarría had received $196,035.46 in life insurance from Vigoreaux, with the total paid by the various companies rising to $315,866.86.

Following counter interrogation of witnesses and procedural debate from both parts, the gas canister was admitted as evidence. Echevarría's former domestic worker, Cruz María Ortiz, testified that she had seen López Watts in the actress' house on January 13, 1986. The prosecution closed its case with 40 witnesses and 140 exhibits, key among which were letter authored by Echevarría. Judge Laura Nieves Van Rhyn conducted a view of the scene. The defense proceeded to interview the witnesses discarded by the prosecution and began presenting its case. Sepúlveda was brought, but refused to testify to not incriminate himself, as the defense focused on the contradictions in his testimony and the prosecution's case. The defense sat several artists who testified that Echevarría was not on her house the night of the murder and that they had not heard her talk with Newman or López Watts during that night. Her lawyers recommended her not to sit as a witness. As the defense rested its case, both sides presented their reports. On May 1, 1986, the jury returned its verdict declaring Echevarría guilty of all charges, while López Watts was found not guilty of first-degree murder and guilty of the other charges. They were placed in custody, awaiting sentencing. The defense announced that it would seek a certiorari resource before the PRSC. On June 20, 1986, Echevarría was sentenced to 208 years and López Watts to 114 years.

=== Revision by the Supreme Court of Puerto Rico ===
In December 1986, the San Juan court worked on producing a transcript of the proceedings for the continuation. In January 1987, the PRSC accepted the certiorari of the case. In August 1987, Echevarría's lawyer Carmen Ana Pensante protested the transcript presented by the San Juan court. In June 1988, the defense requested the release of Echevarría while the case was pending, citing that the state had failed to respond in time. In November 1989, the defense filed a motion requesting a faster resolution of the case, which had languished at the PRSC. Ultimately, the PRSC confirmed the sentences citing that the court did not agree that the constitutionally compromising errors alleged had taken place during the initial process. The defense filed reconsideration motions in April and later in June, both of which were denied on the grounds that small procedural errors that would not have changed the initial outcome did not warrant a reversal. Only judge Francisco Rebollo López issued a dissenting opinion, considering that the process had been biased.

On December 20, 1999, governor Pedro Rosselló commuted her sentence to the statutory minimum. The Parole Board of the Commonwealth of Puerto Rico granted the release on January 27, 2000. Echevarría resumed acting for some time, before relocating abroad and retiring from the limelight. Newman lived out his life in anonymity, being found dead at his house in November 2019. After completing his 15 year sentence, López Watts disappeared into obscurity.

== Media coverage and public reaction ==
The arrest of Echevarría in September 1984 caused widespread shock throughout the Puerto Rican artistic community, a sentiment shared by the Vigoreaux children. She was followed by a group of citizens that heckled her wherever she went after the revelation. Urban legends quickly emerged following the accusations, including one stating that Echevarría accompanied the Guadalupe brothers and personally took photos of the ongoing scene. According to this tale, these were taken by the actress were hidden at a cave in the municipality of Juncos, from where they were later retrieved by the police. This raised concerns of how the excessive publicity, morbid or speculative narratives and widespread sensationalism would affect the presumption of innocence in court. The case gathered headlines in newspapers abroad, including The New York Times, Orlando Sentinel and the United Press International service.

Abrahán Díaz González, president of the Puerto Rico Bar Association, criticized how willing the Department of Justice had been to comment on an unfinished investigation, stating that "never before had we seen a Secretary of Justice commenting on the development of a case". Héctor Rivera Cruz, who had been a special investigator for the Senate of Puerto Rico during the Cerro Maravilla murders, also considered the handling of the case "improper" due to the public declarations offered by both the prosecution and the agency. The media coverage of the murder was widespread from the onset and the public reaction was so pronounced that in an editorial, the newspaper El Mundo argued that the "commotion [would] not be satisfied with anything less than the arrest and conviction" of the crime's authors. Puerto Rico House of Representatives president Severo Colberg requested a minute of silence during the legislative proceedings that surrounded the governor's state of the island speech. The coverage throughout media was so widespread that it displaced the political message to second place in coverage. Morbidity and sensationalism were also noted in the press coverage and among the public, with the most violent aspects of the crime being emphasized and epithets such as "diabolical", "bestial" being used to describe it.

The body was placed on display at San Juan two days later, with hundreds attending the initial vigil. A flag of Puerto Rico was donated by Iris Chacón and placed next to the casket. A Catholic mass was held and the funeral procession to his final testing place at Cementerio Buxada was attended by thousands. A special show replaced his program, El Show del Mediodía on WAPA-TV during which several artists held what was held as "a somber" memorial. Others, with whom he had shared stage like José Miguel Agrelot and fellow producers Tommy Muñiz and Paquito Cordero also expressed disbelief. Independent masses in his memory were held by other artistic groups.

When the case stalled, his siblings and children (led by Angie, José Gabriel and Roberto) created the civic group Hermandad Luis Vigoreaux and began organizing mass protests demanding police action. A number of public figures, including former governor Rafael Hernández Colón, joined these initiatives and made public demands of their own. As more time passed more false rumors swirled, including one linking musician Junno Faría to the murder and predicting an "imminent arrest". Actress and politician Velda González was critical of the pace in which the investigation was conducted. On the eve of the first anniversary of the crime, the Catholic Church lobbied in favor of solving the case through its newspaper, El Visitante. The Hermandad Luis Vigoreaux resumed its work by organizing a silent march demanding justice.

== Aftermath and memorials ==
Days after the murder, Cheo Feliciano composed and performed a song in his honor in a game of the Cangrejeros de Santurce, for which Vigoreaux was an announcer. In April 1983, the Asociación de Agencias Publicitarias de Puerto Rico, which grouped the island's publicists and firms, held a dinner in his memory at the Caribe Hilton. The third edition of the Festival de Nuevos Talentos de Puerto Rico, an event where young artists were featured, was dedicated to his memory. A year later, a marble cross was installed at the place where the car was found. The Agüeybaná Award for Best Producer was posthumously renamed Trofeo Luis Vigoreaux in his honor. Organizations with which he had associated and shows in which he participated dedicated future events in his honor. In November 1984, the murder and its fallout where the topic of an investigative report by WKAQ-TV's news branch Telenoticias, being titled Vigoreaux, la otra cara de la moneda. In April 1985, Geraldo Rivera did an episode of 20/20 dedicated to the murder titled "Who Done It?", where Echevarría was interviewed prior to the second preliminary hearing and vehemently denied involvement. In February 1986, WAPA-TV's Noticentro published its own investigative series titled Luis Vigoreaux… La Verdadera Historia. Following the guilty veredict, the station also aired interviews with Echevarría and Newman. A group named Movimiento Pro Justicia para Lydia Echevarría was led by Vanessa Vigoreaux and Julia Rodríguez and organized protests.

The murder continued being used as an analogy for the social issues of 1980s Puerto Rico for years to come. The proceedings were the topic for Nelson del Castillo's book 208 años de cárcel: Crónicas del juicio (1988), which sold more than 25,000 copies in various markets. As revision of the case was pending in the PRSC, Newman was interviewed in WLII-DT's Dime la verdad. In September 1985, evangelical pastor Jorge Raschke stated in a sermon in front of the Capitol that Vigoreaux had died due to his criticism of the religious group. When the Hato Rey court began the trial for the Cerro Maravilla murders, the security measures used for this process were used as reference. The case spun another, when Sylvia Coral Fred Rivera was accused of plotting to murder judge Laura Nieves de Van Rhyn motivated by the guilty verdict against Echevarría. In February 1989, Carmen Jovet interviewed Echevarría in a show named Controversial, after which public opinion swinged in favor (63%) of a reconsideration of the sentence. More than 42 years after the murder, El Nuevo Día revisited the case as part of the fourth season of its "Las Caras del Crimen" (lit. "The Faces of Crime") investigative series.
