= Roberto Vigoreaux =

Puerto Rican politician

Roberto Vigoreaux Lorenzana

Member of the Puerto Rico Senate from the at-large district
- In office January 2, 2001 – January 1, 2005

Member of the Puerto Rico House of Representatives
- In office January 2, 1997 – January 1, 2001

Personal details
- Born: January 12, 1956 (age 70) San Juan, Puerto Rico
- Party: Popular Democratic Party
- Other political affiliations: Popular Democratic Party
- Education: University of Puerto Rico; Loyola University New Orleans
- Profession: Politician, producer, actor, singer

Military service
- Allegiance: United States
- Branch/service: Puerto Rico Air National Guard

Roberto Vigoreaux Lorenzana (born January 12, 1956, in San Juan, Puerto Rico) is a Puerto Rican producer, TV show host, actor, singer, and former Senator. He is the son of TV producer Luis Vigoreaux, and the younger brother of Luisito Vigoreaux. Roberto Vigoreaux was born on January 12, 1956, to producer Luis Vigoreaux and Rosaura Lorenzana. He is the youngest of two sons, the other being Luisito Vigoreaux. In 1970, Vigoreaux starred as Chago in the Walt Disney Production Cristobalito, the Calypso Colt, when he was still a young teenager. Vigoreaux studied at the University of Puerto Rico, and then at Loyola University New Orleans. Later in his life, Vigoreaux worked as a radio broadcaster in several stations, as well as acting in plays. Throughout his career, he has worked for stations like Radio Rock, WAPA Radio, Radio Aeropuerto and Radio Luz.

In 1984, Vigoreaux hosted the show Son del Caribe. Some time later, he moved to WAPA-TV where he starred hosting a game show called Parejo, doble, y triple with his brother, Luisito. He also hosted the show Sábado en Grande. After performing a duet on his show Sábado en Grande, with singer Lourdes Robles, Vigoreaux decided to start a musical career. In 1988, he released his first and only album titled Amores de mi vida. Vigoreaux has also worked as a host of several beauty pageants. He also had roles in comedies and shows like Generaciones, and musicals like Clemente, where he played the role of his father. In the late 1980s he played the role of Joe Hardy in a revival of the Broadway musical Damn Yankees, with Marian Pabón. Outside entertainment, Vigoreaux opened an ice cream franchise called Scoops, with stores in San Juan, Cayey, and Bayamón.

== Early years and studies ==
He was one of three siblings from this matrimony of whom the youngest, Felipe, died at the age of nine. His surviving brothers were Jorge and Luisito Vigoreaux. His mother was Eladia Rivera, who believed that Roberto took after his father. His first became involvement with in the arts took at the age of five, serving as presenter of school events. In his early childhood, Vigoreaux was part of the cast of Disney's film Cristobalito, the Calypso Colt. His father gave him the first job in television at the age of 13. While attending Academia Sagrado Corazón at Santurce, Vigoreaux was part of a club named The Sea Hunters, which scavenged the coast for historical artifacts, serving as its photographer. By the mid-1970s, he was an university student. Vigoreaux completed a bachelor's degree in Pedagogy and Dramatic Arts. Before entering the television business, he worked on the electronics market.

== Entertainment career ==
In September 1978, he produced Estrella Rosado's adaptation of Paul Zindel's And Miss Reardon Drinks a Little at the Ateneo Puertorriqueño. In November 1978, Vigoreaux acted in Producciones Cisne's adaptation of Eduardo de Filippo's Filomena Marturano at Centro Cultural in Mayagüez. He reprised the role when the play was staged at Teatro Tapia as part of the Institute of Puerto Rican Culture's (ICP) Festival de Teatro Internacional. The play then moved to the Teatro Liberty at Quebradillas. Another was held at the University of Puerto Rico (UPR) at Río Piedras to raise aid for the victims of hurricane David at the Dominican Republic. In May 1980, Vigoreaux returned to the Ateneo Puertorriqueño in an adaptation of Forty Carats by Pierre Barillet and Jean-Pierre Gredy. He continued touring with the company when the play moved to Teatro Tapia. In January 1982, he resumed his participation in Filumena Martuano when it was staged at Centro de Bellas Artes. In April 1982, Vigoreaux joined the cast of Producciones Cisne's adaptation of René Márques' Mariana o el Alba staged at Teatro Tapia as part of the ICP's Teatro Puertorriqueño series. His performance received positive criticism. In May 1982, Vigoreaux appeared in Teatro Puertorriqueño's adaptation of the Roberto Ramos Perea Fetora trilogy, comprised by El llamado de la parca, La muerte de Pandora and Ese punto de vista and were staged at the Ateneo. His performance as Prometeus was well reviewed.

During the divorce process of his father and Lydia Echevarría, he frequently hosted the elder Vigoreaux in his house. Following the murder of his father, Vigoreaux served as spokesperson for his children and also protected his father's girlfriend, Nydia Castillo, from media inquiries. When the case stalled, his siblings and children (led by Angie, José Gabriel and Roberto) created the civic group Hermandad Luis Vigoreaux and began organizing protests demanding police action. In May 1983, Vigoreaux returned to theater in Roberto Ramos Perea's Revolución en el Purgatorio. In August 1983, he joined the newly formed Attika group in its debut play, Módulo 104 (Revolución en el Purgatorio) by Roberto Ramos Perea, staged at Teatro Sylvia Rexach. His performance received good criticism for a "consistent and true characterization". In October 1983, Vigoreaux performed in Vive como quieras (an adaptation of You can't take it with you by Moss Hart and George S. Kaufman), directed by Myrna Casas and staged at CBA. His performance received negative criticism as "disappointingly weak and sullen". The following month, Vigoreaux joined the cast of ICP-sponsored showings of James Goldman's The Lion in Winter at Teatro Tapia. His performance was described as "out of character for the king of France". During the summer of 1983, Vigoreaux signed a promotional deal with Thom McAn to advertise the shoe brand.

In August 1984, he was the presenter of the Carnaval de Belleza, a cosmetics event. Vigoreaux also joined the cast of La verdadera historia de Pedro Navaja, a play where his father had participated in the past, when Teatro del Sesenta staged it at Teatro Sylvia Rexach. He was given the role of Rafael McKeanna, the same character previously played by the elder Vigoreaux. The arrest of Echevarría in September 1984 caused widespread shock throughout the Puerto Rican artistic community, a sentiment shared by the Vigoreaux children. During the preliminary hearing against Echevarría and the other accused, the prosecution tried to include him as a last-minute witness. By the end of the year, the press regarded him as a potential television presenter and host. In February 1985, the Vigoreaux brothers debuted the evening game show Parejo, doble o triple at WAPA-TV. Producer Elín Ortiz expected the brothers to refresh the programming of the channel, presenting the show in a press conference at the Condado Holiday Inn. In May 1985, Vigoreaux served as presenter of WAPA-TV's presentation of the Feria Calidad de Vida. Parejo, doble y triple proved a success, receiving additional slots Tuesdays and Thursdays, with their style being compared to that of their father. The brothers were also selected as co-presenters of Sábado en Grande, which was placed opposite of WKAQ-TV's Súper Sábados.

They were part of the 1985 Fiestas de la Constitución organized by the government and the Institute of Puerto Rican Culture, being featured in a stage at Castillo San Felipe del Morro. In September 1985, the Vigoreaux were cast as a pair of twins in the comedy play Tú y yo somos tres staged at Teatro Tapia. During this time, the entertainment media described the duo as "the hottest property in town", but also speculated that they could become overexposed. In August 1985, the brothers were contracted to make a show at the historic pre-Columbian site Cueva Pajita in Lares. They returned to the cavern for an encore in October 1985. Vigoreaux helped the Teatro del '60 theatre troupe purchase Teatro Sylvia Rexach. In November 1985, the brothers served as masters of ceremonies for a concert of the pop band Los Chikles at San Germán. While the trial was still being prepared, Tropical Development Corporation filed a lawsuit against the Vigoreaux brothers and Echevarría demanding mortgage execution. Another case was filed in the San Juan District Court over debt that Vigoreaux Enterprises had with the Girod Trust Company, with the finances of the deceased artists becoming a topic of contention between Echevarría's defense and the prosecution.

At the Festival Puertorriqueño del Disco y la Radio, the brothers won the award for "Presenters of the Year". In December 1985, they were contracted by Hotel Cerromar at Dorado to host the local festivities of Hyatt's international Biggest Little Office Christmas Party. Leading up to the trial, the prosecution unveiled Vigoreaux as one of its witnesses. By the year's end, the brothers were noted to have gained influence over the administration at WAPA-TV. They returned to radio by co-hosting the morning programming for Radio Rock. In February 1985, Vigoreaux joined the cast of WAPA-TV's evening comedy Generaciones. Individually, Vigoreaux continued working with local chains outside of media. Roberto and Luisito appeared in a Burger King commercial for the Puerto Rican market, where they acted and sang. In March 1986, the brothers began hosting Bacardi's Noches de San Juan on Fridays. Vigoreaux won the 1985 Best Presenter Award at the Cemíes de Oro. Outside television, the brothers collaborated with Sunshine Logroño on the production of events. During this time, Vigoreaux also began performing as a singer.

In July 1986, Vigoreaux joined Lourdes Passalacqua and Hiram Collazo Jr. in the WAPA-AM show Sus Compañeros del Tapón. That month, he also joined the Ponce Holiday Inn for the Gran Noche de Estrellas to raise funds for the APC. In August 1986, the Vigoreaux brothers participated in WAPA-TV's Expo Fiesta appearing as spokespersons for the Liga Contra el Cáncer. The brothers returned to host the 1986 MDA tele-marathon. After his brother was removed from Sábado en Grande, Vigoreaux requested to be the only host of the show. In October 1986, Vigoreaux expressed his desire to pursue a formal career as a singer and actor, having had successful skits with Lourdes Robles and Lou Briel in Sábado en Grande. As such, he expaected to leaving presenting eventually, considering both irreconcilable in terms of scheduling. Vigoreaux announced that his first LP would be released in February 1987. He was a guest in the debut of El Show de Mario Pabón. In 1986, Vigoreaux was romantically involved with Marisol Gallisá. The brothers reunited in Silverio Pérez's Peña en Down Beat.

Outside of show business, Vigoreaux continued serving as presenter in a variety of events, including the inauguration of a nightclub and the University of Puerto Rico at Cayey's Christmas Concert. On December 22, 1986, Vigoreaux left WAPA-TV, initially saying that the move was to begin his full time career as a singer. In January 1987, Annie Alfaro invited him for an edition of WMTJ's Tras Bastidores dedicated to his departure from television. Vigoreaux later stated that he felt mistreated during his last weeks at the channel and weighted whether the media exposure warranted continuing there. He also used this hiatus from television to focus on managing an ice cream store named Scoop, which he opened at Isla Verde. Vigoreaux continued active in radio as part of Tús Compañeros del Tapón. During this time, he also worked with Plaza las Américas on events. In February 1987, Vigoreaux was a guest in WKAQ-TV's Súper Sábados. The brothers created Hermandad Luis Vigoreaux, which worked with the municipality of Ceiba to build a monument for their father. By this time, he dismissed the possibility of working on telenovelas. Instead, Vigoreaux accepted joined the Crest All American Circus as ringmaster, another role that his father had done before (for Circo Panamericano). In March 1987, he represented Puerto Rico at the New York-based Asociación de Cronistas de Espectáculos (ACE) awards. In April 1987, he joined the cast of the musical Clemente, about the life of baseball player and philanthropist Roberto Clemente, interpreting his father.

In May 1987, he served as master of ceremonies of the Miss Puerto Rico National Teenager pageant for WORO-TV. During the summer, Vigoreaux began working with WLII-DT, starting with Gran Caravana de Artistas. However, this was brief as he joined his brother in La Hora de Oro for WAPA-TV and Plesbicito for WSTE-DT. Vigoreaux was part of the cast of Jacobo Morales' Lo que le pasó a Santiago (1988). He received positive criticism for this role. During the spring of 1988, Vigoreaux served as the ring master of El Gran Circo. In May 1988, Vigoreaux was involved in the recording of Ellos dos y otros más, to be transmitted abroad by Telemundo. He also expanded his Scoop business, opening a store at Cupey. Vigoreaux was also tasked with serving as presenter of the Miss Reina Infantil de Puerto Rico beauty pageant. He appeared as a guest at ¿En serio? Con Silverio and En Casa de Juanma Román. In January 1989, the brothers were invited guests to the TeleOnce talk show Soy Awilda. In February 1989, Vigoreaux returned as ring master of El Gran Circo. He participated in El Show del Mediodía, produced for WAPA-TV by his brother. The Vigoreaux brothers and their wives were selected to lead the 1989-1990 campaign of the Liga Puertorriqueña Contra el Cáncer. As such, he helped the Mayagüez Oncologic Hospital raise funds.

In March 1989, he starred along Meche Mercado in the graphic novel El Rencuentro. The following month, Vigoreaux served as the presenter in TeleOnce's anniversary show. He also worked with WMTJ, joining Ruth Fernández, Efraín López Neris and other artists in a tele-marathon. Vigoreaux was also featured in WSJN's Mundo musical and TeleOnce's Raúl y Marilyn. He retuned as master of ceremonies for the 1989 Miss Reina Infantil de Puerto Rico for WAPA-TV. After hurricane Hugo struck Puerto Rico and caused significant losses, Vigoreaux participated in an event held at Casa España to raise funds. He also joined Los Rayos Gamma and the music group Múltiples Ellas in a charity tour for the island municipalities of Culebra and Vieques. In December 1989, Vigoreaux served as master of ceremonies of Miss Puerto Rico Turismo. Vigoreaux was part of SúperSiete's New Year's Eve special. In January 1990, Vigoreaux hosted the Fiestas de nuestra gente concert at Cabo Rojo. For SúperSiete he appeared in the late nught comedy El ring del humor. In April 1990, Vigoreaux was the presenter of a Braulio concert. In May 1990, Vigoreaux joined José Vega Santana in organizing a children's bicycle race. In October 1990, he served as master of ceremonies for the cultural event Gran Encuentro Internacional de Bailes Folclóricos. In November 1990, Vigoreaux was the master of ceremonies of Fantasía bajo las estrellas, a concert that raised funds for cancer research.

== Career in politics: 1996–2004 ==
=== Representative: 1996–2000 ===
In 1993, Vigoreaux retired from show business and began to pursue a career as a politician. In 1996, he was elected as a member of the Puerto Rico House of Representatives for the Popular Democratic Party (PPD).

=== Senator: 2000–2004 ===
Vigoreaux was elected in 2000 as a senator.

==== Candidate for Mayor of San Juan: 2003 ====
Vigoreaux announced his interest in running for mayor of the city of San Juan during the elections of 2004. However, he lost in the 2003 primaries against Eduardo Bhatia. After that, he has continued to work as an adviser to the Senate of Puerto Rico.

=== Return to politics: 2011–2012 ===
In September 2011, Vigoreaux announced his candidacy to the House of Representatives for the 2012 general elections. However, he lost at the PPD primaries held on March 18.

== Personal life ==
Vigoreaux is Catholic and has been critical of what he considers the "commercialization of Christmas", which he lamented while reminiscing about the years where his family would reunite at his grandmother's house in traditional Puerto Rican fashion. He also participated in a concert held by the institution in 1989. In 1989, Vigoreaux worked with the Puerto Rico Telephone Company on a Christmas concert titled Fiestas de nuestra gente. During the 1980s, Vigoreaux was identified with the statehood movement, appearing as its representative in the CEE advertising campaign Vamos a votar (1988). However, he was part of the show when pro-status quo politician Rafael Hernández Colón was inaugurated as governor in January 1989, beginning his affiliation to the PPD.

During the 1980s, Vigoreaux began a relationship with actress Giselle Blondet. After this relationship ended, Vigoreaux married Mary Ann Cortés in late 1987. In February 1989, it was announced that they were expecting their first child. They eventually had three children. In 1983, when Roberto was in his 20s, his father Luis Vigoreaux, was brutally murdered. The investigation revealed that Vigoreaux's second wife, Lydia Echevarria, was complicit in his murder, after allegedly she paid two men to beat Vigoreaux. When interviewed in February 1987, Vigoreaux stated that he had not forgiven Echevarría for the murder of his father and criticized how some of the media handled the situation.

== See also ==
- List of Puerto Ricans
- French immigration to Puerto Rico
