= Rubén Gómez =

Rubén Gómez may refer to:

- Rubén Gómez (baseball) (1927–2004), Puerto Rican baseball player
- Rubén Darío Gómez (1940-2010), Colombian Olympic cyclist
- Rubén Gómez (singer) (born 1974), American singer; sang with Menudo
- Rubén Gómez (Argentine footballer) (born 1984), Argentine football midfielder
- Rubén Gómez (footballer, born 2002), Spanish football goalkeeper for Villarreal B
- Rubén Gómez (footballer, born 2009), Spanish football winger for Atletico Madrid juvenil
