= Lydia Echevarría =

Puerto Rican actress and television personality

- Born: Lydia Echevarría Rodríguez; October 14, 1931 (age 95); Caguas, Puerto Rico
- Occupations: Actress, television host

Lydia Echevarría (born October 14, 1931 in Caguas, Puerto Rico) is a Puerto Rican actress who was convicted of plotting the murder of her husband, Puerto Rican television show producer, Luis Vigoreaux. They met in 1959, later working together in radio during the presentation of a show called La Hora Cero (Zero Hour), which he produced with actor Mario Pabón. On February 10, 1960, after they were married, Echevarría joined her husband as co-host in the 1960s and 70s in the television shows Pa'rriba Papi Pa'rriba and Sube Nene Sube transmitted through WAPA-TV. Vigoreaux and Echevarría had two daughters, Vanessa and Glendaly Vigoreaux. In 1983, Vigoreaux was found burnt to death inside his car. Almost immediately, a large part of the public started pointing fingers at different people, and in 1984, Echevarría was formally accused of her husband's death. Her trial was one of the most sensational in Puerto Rican history, with a media circus atmosphere because of the celebrity status of the couple. In 1986, she was found guilty and sentenced to 208 years in a women's prison in Vega Alta, Puerto Rico. Echevarría's sentence was commuted by Pedro Rosselló in 1999 and she briefly resumed her acting career, eventually retiring and relocating outside Puerto Rico.

== Entertainment career ==
=== Early years ===
In July 1959, Echevarría was cast as the titular character in Francisco de Arriví's drama play Sirena, where she first coincided with Luis Vigoreaux. Her character was meant to reflect the psychological conflicts experienced by mixed raced children that faced discrimination and attempted to favor their European heritage. In radio, Vigoreaux and Echevarría coincided while performing in the radio show La Hora Cero. In April 1960, Echevarría was scheduled to appear in the play Cielo Caído, but withdrew after creative disagreements with the director, as did Vigoreaux. Ultimately, the couple attended the debut of the play at Teatro Tapia. Vigoreaux and Echevarría were involved with the play El Avaro that was part of the Festival Puertorriqueño de Teatro Universal. Vigoreaux was the musical director of the WKAQ radio novel Una Luz en el Camino, which starred Echevarría. In January 1961, Vigoreaux and Echevarría picketed when director Barry B. Yellen refused to cast local artists in the San Juan Drama Festival, for which both were arrested. Judge Roberto Veray Torregrosa found them, along a group of 43 other artists, not guilty of illegal assembly. In October 1961, the radio novel El Derecho a la Felicidad debuted in WKAQ starring Echevarría and with Vigoreaux as its musical producer. In March 1962, WKAQ debuted the novel Corona de Lágrimas, once agains starring Echevarría with Vigoreaux as musical director. In February 1963, WKAQ debuted the novel El Cobarde, once again starring Echevarría and with the musical direction of Vigoreaux.

In August 1963, Vigoreaux musicalized the radio novel Frente al Odio, starring Echevarría. In December 1963, the couple resumed their recurrent roles in WKAQ's radio novel ¡Frente al pasado que acusa!. In January 1964, Vigoreaux and Echevarría co-presented the Galas de París fashion show at San Juan, the former in Spanish and the latter in English. The couple also helped the Sociedad Pro Niños y Adultos Lisiados raise funds for the disabled. Both Vigoreaux and Echevarría were finalists for the Yunque de Oro, awards given to the most popular artists in Puerto Rican media. The couple sponsored a ball dance and a caravan in benefit of the SANL. In August 1967, Vigoreaux and Echevarría starred in WAPA-TV's comedy show Diario a un Hijo por Nacer. In February 1968, the Liga Contra el Cáncer announced Vigoreaux and Echevarría their marketing campaign representatives for the year. Both were among the Top-15 most popular artists leading up to the fourth edition of the Festival de Popularidad. couple once again placed among the most popular artists of Puerto Rico during the spring of 1969, being included among the voting of the Festival de Popularidad. In December 1969, Echevarría won the award for best female radio announcer at the Festival Codazos. April 1970, Vigoreaux and Echevarría served as co-presenters at the Caribe Hilton. When Yolanda Montes was brought to Puerto Rico to perform in Luis Vigoreaux Presenta, Echevarría welcomed her. In August 1970, she served as a jury member of the Lady Puerto Rico beauty pageant, which selected the local representative for the Lady Universe contest that was held at Italy. The couple was invited to Metro Goldwyn Meyer's (MGM) debut gala of David Lean's Ryan's Daughter (1970) for the Latin American market.

=== Producciones Luis Vigoreaux ===
For the 1970 Festival Codazos, Vigoreaux was nominated for the "Caballero de la Televisión" and Echevarría for the "Dama de la Televisión" categories, both representing the main awards in their respective branches. The couple also co-won the 1970 Agüeybaná Award for "most elegant artist in television". In January 1971, the couple participated in a homage for Tany Pérez that was organized by the Cangrejeros de Santurce. In November 28, 1971, Echevarría participated in the annual convention of the Asociación de Industriales de Puerto Rico. The couple were guests in WIPR-TV's Sunday show Arte y Artistas. In April 1973, she was involved when the Hato Rey Lions Club also held a homage in Vigoreaux's honor. The following month, Vigoreaux and Echevarría took part in the Chaine de Rotisseurs's gala banquet at the Fortín San Gerónimo historic site. In December 1973, as starters of the 1973 Honda Christmas Rally. Later than month, Vigoreaux and Echevarría named Hernández Colón an honorary member of the ALPRI, during the acts that opened the "Week of the Announcer". They were contracted to host the New Day's Eve special for WAPA-TV. In January 1974, Vigoreaux and Echevarría participated in the governor's personal Three Kings Day party. In February 1974, director Onix Báez revealed that he had written the theatrical drama No Fue Fácil Asesinar a la Tía Camelia with Echevarría in mind, noting that the plot of the play was about a murder taking place within a wealthy family. By the 1970s, Produciones Vigoreaux was responsible for five shows, which were produced by Vigoreaux along a staff that included Echevarría on both the on-camera content and the contractual aspect of the business. Echevarría served as vice-president of the corporation.

In June 1974, Echevarría was selected as Festival Marshal in the Cuarto Festival de Batuteras at Parque Municipal in Guaynabo. When a contract between Vigoreaux and the government gathered criticism, he withdrew from public view and reportedly didn't inform Echevarría of his location. Vigoreaux and Echevarría cohosted the 1975 Jerry Lewis-MDA tele-marathon for WAPA-TV. She was part of the 1976 Miss Puerto Rico jury. The couple was once again selected to co-host the 1976 Jerry Lewis-MDA television-marathon. The couple returned to host the 1976 New Year's show for WAPA-TV. The couple returned to co-host the Jerry Lewis-MDA tele-marathon for a fourth straight year. In June 1977, Vigoreaux and Echevarría announced an annual grant to be awarded to artists. In the 1978 Jerry Lewis-MDA tele-marathon, they were joined by Joaquín Monserrat as presenters. In December 1978, Vigoreaux and Echevarría produced the television special Luis Vigoreaux Presenta Desde México. The couple hosted the inauguration of the Isla Verde Holiday Inn's night club known as "El Cacique" in a CVC Productions event. They also held a recognition for Manuel Fernández Cortines when he produced his 40th theatre play. In March 1976, Vigoreaux and Echevarría recorded a special program celebrating the 25th year of Agrelot's career. In April 1979, Vigoreaux produced the Manuel G. Piñera's Requiem para una madre starring Echevarría.

In July 1979, Vigoreaux and Echevarría acted in an adaptation of Enrique Jardiel Porcella's comedy A las seis en la esquina del Boulevard. She next appeared when her husband inaugurated his theatre, Teatro CVC, at Parada 16 in Santurce. After Vigoreaux moved from WAPA-TV, the couple did not continue hosting the Red Cross' tele-marathon, which the station's general manager criticized. In January 1980, Echevarría won the award for "Female Presenter of the Year" at Festival Codazos. Vigoreaux, Exchevarría and Pedro Zervigón were selected by the Sociedad de Niños y Adultos Lisiados de Puerto Rico as representatives for its 1980 public campaign, which included a special show titled Nuevos Horizontes.

=== Separation and murder of Vigoreaux ===
Vigoreaux returned to producing for WAPA-TV, while Echevarría signed as a telenovela actress with WKAQ-TV. This physical separation led to matrimonial issues and by February 1981, the matrimony was considering divorce. While Vigoreaux did not publicly comment on the matter, Echevarría denied responsibility and stated that she enjoyed acting more than presenting. The matter escalated when both held a reunion due to an unrelated matter that involved on of their daughters, during which both sides accused each other of physically assaulting the other. The incident continued when both moved to the building's parking and ultimately led to Echevarría pursuing charges for attempted murder against Vigoreaux, after she was expelled from his car and fell to the road. The case was taken to the San Juan Court, where he paid a bail of $5,000. While noting that the divorce was already underway, Vigoreaux stated that he had moved on and was seeing another woman. He later admitted that during the incident, he used the outdated practice of slapping Echevarría, claiming that she was "in a state of hysteria", but also argued that she had hit him as well. Vigoreaux did not appear in his programs in the timeframe immediately following this accusation and did not attend the scheduled preliminary hearing, citing health issues. He was defended by Joaquín Peña Peña, who also acted along Echevarría in WKAQ-TV's telenovela Viernes Social. The preliminary hearing was postponed three times and was ultimately postponed for January 1982.

On January 17, 1983, the charred remains of entertainment personality and businessman Luis Vigoreaux were found stuffed inside the trunk of his own car at an isolated sector of San Juan, Puerto Rico. Echevarría attended the vigil and the subsequent funeral procession for her husband, accompanied by her two daughters with the producer and reportedly fainted during the final stretch. Echevarría continued active in her work as an actress and offering interviews, but her lawyer prohibited the discussion of the murder with the press. Indignation surrounded her figure, as she was suspected to have been behind the events from the onset. A testament that Vigoreaux had completed before a notary on February 9, 1977, was opened at her request, naming her as the executrix of his will. The document benefited Echevarría, as she was still his legal wife, and his children from two marriages. In 1984, she joined the cast of Juan González's theatrical play Tiempo Muerto by Produccione Candilejas. For her performance as the character "Juana", Echevarría received the Best Female Performance of the Year from the Círculo de Críticos de Teatro de Puerto Rico.

=== Trial and conviction ===
The state initially depended on the account of the events offered by several witnesses, including Juan Orlando Sepúlveda and Nitza Guadalupe Nuñez. Another source to come forward with a similar claim was Manuel Lecaroz Passarell. According to the prosecution, between January 15 and 16, Echevarría and bondsman Edgardo Vázquez Reyes visited the house of Pedro Guadalupe Aquino, where they made an offer to pay the family the sum of $25,000 in exchange for the murder, which would be paid as long as the presenter was tortured prior to being killed. According to this legal theory, Echevarría was stated to have employed Rubén Guadalupe as a gardener and handy man after the crime. Varius conspiracy theories placed her at the scene of the crime, where she was said to have taken photos that were hidden at a cave in the municipality of Juncos, which were dismissed by the authorities.

Accusations were filed by the police's Special Investigation Bureau on September 2, 1984. The Department of Justice only identified bondsman Edgardo Vázquez Reyes, who was offered immunity in exchange for his cooperation (one of three such offers) but declined it, opting to argue in favor of his innocence. The Secretary noted that they would pursue charges against six individuals, including "a prominent figure", four of them actively participated in the murder. Two were reported to be related and also involved in the investigation of the murder of lawyer Néstor Márquez Díaz. WAPA-TV broke the news that Echevarría was the public figure being hinted. This caused a mob to gather outside the San Juan court, expecting her arrival. She was accused along four others, Vázquez Reyes, Pablo Guadalupe Nuñez, Pablo Guadalupe Aquino and Jorge Jaime Guadalupe, of first degree murder, aggravated kidnapping, conspiracy to commit murder and various violations of the Puerto Rico Weapons Act. Echevarría did not appear before court and was speculated to have left the jurisdiction, but was represented by her lawyer Eli B. Arroyo in the hearing where probable cause was established. Her bond was set at $600,000. Besides Andrade, Nitza Guadalupe Núñez testified against her brothers and the actress. The police monitored the movements of Echevarría for three before the accusations.

Before this, Echevarría was preparing to take on the role of Madge Kendal in an adaptation of The Elephant Man to be held at Teatro Tapia, having already joined the rehearsals. She was arrested in the house of a family member at University Gardens in Río Piedras and taken to the office of the Special Investigations Bureau on September 3, 1984, being incarcerated at the Guayama Correctional Center that night after failing to pay the bond. The actress tried to avoid being photographed by the media at all times. The police searched for Vanessa Vigoreaux, the youngest daughter of the couple, for questioning but she left Puerto Rico in a hurry. Echevarría pledged them to leave her out of the investigation. Two days later, Superior Judge Daniel López Pritchard lowered the bond amount to $56,800 at the request of attorneys Arroyo and Eugenio Ramos Ortiz and despite the prostest of the prosecution who noted that she was a wealthy citizen. Vanessa Vigoreaux returned to Puerto Rico, but her involvement in the case was kept confidential by the police. On September 6, 1984, theater director Victoria Espinosa provided an alibi for the presence of Echevarría at the murder scene, citing that she had been at rehearsals that day. She resumed her acting career with an appearance in the play Maten a Borges. In February 1985, Echavarría impugned the use of Sepúlveda's testimony against her.

The arrest of Echevarría in September 1984 caused widespread shock throughout the Puerto Rican artistic community, a sentiment shared by the Vigoreaux children. She was followed by a group of citizens that heckled her wherever she went after the revelation. During the preliminary hearing, her neighbors testified to not listening any noises at her house that night, while her defense tried to discredit the mental state of one of the prosecution's main witness. Ultimately, the court found cause to proceed to trial against Echevarría, who attended the accusation hearing on December 10, 1984. The trial was scheduled to begin the next year. In April 1985, Vázquez Reyes publicly claimed that Martínez Acosta had offered him $40,000 to testify against Echevarría, while the case against the Guadalupe brothers was dismissed in May 1985.In January 1985, Echevarría made her last theater appearances before the legal process, performing in Produciones Candilejas' Doce paredes negras at Teatro Tapia. While the case was pending, she negotiated a return to television. In the meantime, she joined Raquel Montero in the play Las Confinadas.

In April 1985, Vázquez Reyes publicly claimed that Martínez Acosta had offered him $40,000 to testify against Echevarría, while the case against the Guadalupe brothers was dismissed. When the prosecution led by Luis A. Román completed its re-investigation of the murder, which included the interview of 40 individuals, a new accusation was levied against Echevarría. This one identified her as the intellectual author of the murder, which was perpetrated by the new co-defendant David López Watts. According to this version, Echevarría and López Watts also hatched a plot to murder Nydia Castillo as well. On April 14, 1985, judge Sylvia Ricardo found probable cause for the charges of murder in the first degree and conspiracy to commit murder, with a bond being set at $130,000. Vanessa Vigoreaux was also charged for contempt on the court. López Watts received a bond of $125,000. The actress and her daughter paid their bonds, but López Watts was unable to. The following day Francisco José Newman, a model and friend of Echevarría, was revealed as the Department of Justice's main witness and collaborator. The version of the events that was ultimately led to conviction stated that Echevarría first approached her friend and self-identified lover, model Francisco José Newman, to join her in a plot to murder Nydia Castillo out of jealousy. In turn, he brought López Watts to participate in the plot. In a reunion at her house, Echevarría agreed to pay Newman the sum of $25,000 and gave him a copy of the key to Vigoreaux's car. Following an incident in which Vanessa Vigoreaux confronted her father for intending to marry Castillo, a new reunion was held. It was here that the presenter was also added as a target of the conspiracy for the same amount.

Echevarría was allowed to perform in Doce Paredes Negras, but did so under heavy police presence at the Teatro Yagüez theatre. However, she did not allow questions regarding the ongoing case. While the trial was still being prepared, Tropical Development Corporation filed a lawsuit against the Vigoreaux brothers and Echevarría demanding mortgage execution. Another case was filed in the San Juan District Court over debt that Vigoreaux Enterprises had with the Girod Trust Company, with the finances of the deceased artists becoming a topic of contention between Echevarría's defense and the prosecution. On May 1, 1986, the jury returned its verdict declaring Echevarría guilty of all charges, while López Watts was found not guilty of First Degree Murder and guilty of the other charges. They were placed in custody, awaiting sentencing. The defense announced that it would seek a certiorari resource before the PRSC. Her demeanor was described as "normal and relaxed" after she completed the intake process at the Escuela Industrial para Mujeres Vega Alta. She received the visit of her children while awaiting sentencing, which gained media attention.

=== Incarceration and release ===
In jail, Echevarría began offering theatrical classes to the other inmates. She also began writing a memoir. However, while she was awaiting sentencing she could not be assigned a permanent role within the complex. After being sentenced to 208 years, the possibility of moving her from maximum security to medium security was pondered by Correctional Administrator Mercedes Otero de Ramos. Echevarría was transferred to general population and assigned to work on cosmetology and mundillo.

Echevarría publicly lobbied for a series of improvements to the treatment of the inmates at the correctional facility, gathering the attention of the agency responsible and of her friend, fellow actress and senator Velda González. In August 1987, Echevarría graduated from a Paralegal Technician's Degree offered to the inmates by the San Juan City College. In October 1988, a criminal case presented before the Bayamón Court by correctional guards Olga Rivera and Rosa Rondón against Echevarría for allegedly threatening their lives was dismissed, leading to a protest by the other officers in the Vega Alta compound. However, her health deteriorated and in 1999, Governor Pedro Rosselló allowed her to leave jail to live at home under a curfew. In 2001, she resumed her acting career with the presentation of a play titled Confinadas (meaning, women prisoners) in the same prison where she served her time. Since then she has appeared in plays and some TV shows, on the condition that she be home by 8 p.m. every night. Glendaly Vigoreaux, the couple's eldest daughter, died by suicide in her Arizona residence on July 15, 2008.

== Filmography ==
Among the films and Novelas (soap operas) in which Echevarría has participated are the following:

- Doña Ana (film) - as Dona Ana (2003)
- Life During Wartime - as Evangelina (2009)

Novelas

- Vivir para tí (TV series) - as Clara (1982)
- Yo sé que mentía (TV series) - (1982)

== Personal life ==
Her father was Baltasar Echevarría Deveras, a saxophonist and musician, and her mother was Julia Rodríguez Ramos. Vigoreaux and Echevarría began their relationship after both divorced and had three children from their respective matrimonies. Hers included professor Luis Cruz Echvarría. According to the latter, they felt in love on a personal level that had nothing to do with their artistic careers. The couple had two daughters, Vanessa (born 1985) and Glendaliz (born 1986). Vigoreaux and Echevarría initially lived at Calle O'Neill No. 153 in Hato Rey, San Juan. In October 1971, they relocated to a mansion. There, they hosted a Christmas party in 1971 that included politicians, president of the Federación de Músicos Abraham Peña, the director of the Chamber of Commerce Francisco Buxó, among other influential figures of the time.

The couple also became known for attending theatre plays and other social gatherings, such as the debut of Liza Minnelli at the Hotel San Juan. Vigoreaux and Echevarría also mingled with academia, hosting a cocktail for Günther Haensch at the Hotel Convento along the Asociación de Locutores de Puerto Rico (ALPRI). The couple sponsored the Club Mirabelle at Isla Verde, where they were noted to enjoy the art collection hosted at its gallery. Politically, they were affiliated to the Popular Democratic Party of Puerto Rico (PPD) and performed in its events. Vigoreaux and Echevarría hosted a recognition for then President of the Puerto Rico Senate Rafael Hernández Colón. Echevarría herself led the women of her precinct in a homage to his wife, Lila Mayoral, in October 1972.

She expressed her support for feminism, stating that her belief was in a society where sex-based considerations were eradicated and women did not feel like "second class citizens", promoting changes to the prevailing economic system and more female participation in politics (publicly longing for a woman governor), with the caveat that she did not criticize those that voluntarily choose to be housewives. In December 1975, the couple joined the Puerto Rico Chapter of the Council of Moms. The first edition of the Juegos Deportivos Femeninos were dedicated to Echevarría, among others.

== See also ==
- List of Puerto Ricans
