= Yolandita Monge discography =

This page includes the full discography of Yolandita Monge. Listed are all of Monge's albums in order of their release. Additional information include chart positions.

== Studio albums ==
Year	Album title	Record label	Notes
1969	Puerto Rico's Poignant... Powerful... Incomparable...	Patty Records	
1970	A Star Is Shining	Patty Records	
1971	Recuérdame	Teca Records	
1973	Yo Soy	Audiovox	
1974	Parece Fantasía	Teca Records	
1974	Con Todo Mi Amor	Teca Records	
1975	Floreciendo!	Coco Records	Gold
1976	Reflexiones	Coco Records	
1977	Soy Ante Todo Mujer	Coco Records	
1978	En Su Intimidad	Coco Records	
1980	Fantasia	CBS Records	
1981	Historia de Amour	CBS Records	
1983	Sueños	CBS Records	
1985	Luz de Luna	CBS Records	Gold
1987	Laberinto de Amor	CBS Records	Gold
1988	Vivencias	CBS Records	Double Platinum
1990	Portfolio	CBS Records	Gold
1992	Cara de Ángel	WEA-Latina	Double Platinum
1992	Mi Mejor Regalo	WEA-Latina	
1994	Fiebre de Luna	WEA-Latina	Gold
1995	Yolandita	WEA-Latina	Gold
1997	Mi Encuentro	WEA-Latina	Gold
1999	Siento	BMG U.S. Latin	
2002	Sexto Sentido	Warner Music Latina	
2007	Demasiado Fuerte	Univision Music	Gold
2008	Mala	Universal Music Latino	
2012	Más Para Dar	Roma Entertainment	

== Live albums ==
Year	Album title	Record label	Notes
1988	Nunca Te Diré Adiós / En Concierto	CBS Records	Features the studio track "Nunca Te Diré Adiós", Theme From 'Ave De Paso'
2000	Yolandita En Vivo	BMG U.S. Latin	Features a cover of Glenn Monroig's "Me Dijeron"' and a duet with her daughter Paola González on the song "Sobreviviré". Re-released in 2018 as a digital download retitled 'Trayectoria (En Vivo)'.

== Remixed albums ==
Year	Album title	Record label	Notes
1991	Limited Edition	Sony Discos	LP, Cassette, CD

== Digital singles ==
Year	Song title	Record label
2015	Sin Tí	Southhill Production Corp.

== Maxi single albums ==
Year	Album title	Record label	Notes
1989	Por Tí	CBS Records	LP
1990	Fuiste Un Sueño	CBS Records	LP
1990	No Me Acostumbro	CBS Records	LP
1992	Viviré Sin Tí	WEA-Latina	Cassette/LP

== Compilation albums ==
Year	Album title	Record label	Notes
1975	Sus Grandes Exitos	Teca Records	Double LP
1979	Estilo y Personalidad	Discofon	
1979	Cierra Los Ojos Y Juntos Recordemos	Coco Records	
1981	La Incomparable	Seeco Records	
1981	Vida	Teen Records	
1986	Mis Canciones Preferidas	CBS Records	Gold
1991	Mis Canciones Preferidas 2	Sony Discos	Gold
1993	20 De Colección	Sony Discos	
1993	Antología Musical, Vol. 1	Sony Discos	Double CD
1994	Antología Musical, Vol. 2	Sony Discos	Double CD
1994	Brillantes	Sony Discos	
1995	Brillantes, Vol. 2	Sony Discos	
1997	Latin Stars: 15 Exitos	Sony Discos	
1998	Ayer, Hoy y Siempre	Max Music	
1998	Lo Mejor de Yolandita	WEA-Latina	
2000	Yolandita (2000)	Z Records	
2000	Latin Stars: Yolandita Monge	Tropical Zone Productions	Karaoke CD
2001	Idolos de Siempre: Yolandita Monge	Sony Discos	
2002	Colección de Oro: 15 Exitos	Sony Discos	
2003	Mis 30 Mejores Canciones	Sony Discos	Double CD
2006	Yolandita Monge Selected Hits Volume 1	Charly Records	Digital Download
2006	Yolandita Monge Selected Hits Volume 2	Charly Records	Digital Download
2007	Una Lágrima, Una Sonrisa… Canción Para Una Hija	Musical Productions	Double CD
2007	Canciones de Amor	Sony Music Latin	
2007	10 De Colección	Sony Music Latin	
2010	20 Grandes Exitos	Warner Music Latina	Double CD
2011	Mis Favoritas	Sony Music Latin	
2015	Personalidad	Sony Music Latin	
2015	From The Beginning	Musical Productions	Digital Download

== Special appearances ==
Year	Album title	Record label	Featured Songs
1978	Amor Ilusivo	Coco Records	El Mundo Fue De Dos (From En Su Intimidad), Y Más Te Quiero)
1985	Super Estrellas	Rodven/Sony	Acéptame Como Soy (From Sueños)
1988	Balbino Trópico De Cáncer	Sonotone	De Repente Amándote (Duet With Balbino)
1989	Encuentro De Los Grandes De Estereotempo	Angelo Medina Productions	Quítame Ese Hombre Del Corazón (From Vivencias)
1996	Al Compás De Un Sentimiento: La Música De Pedro Flores	BPPR	Remembranzas / Esperanza Inútil - Qué Extraña Es La Vida / Añoranza
2000	Enamorados	BMG U.S. Latin	Arriesgaré La Piel (From Siento)
2000	Raúl di Blasio DiBlasio: De Mis Manos	BMG U.S. Latin	Ahora, Ahora - Cierra Los Ojos (New Recording)
2005	Olé Hits: Los 1's	Ole Music	Siempre
2005	En Plena Navidad	Ole Music	Aires De Navidad (Duet With Angel López)
2006	50 Hot International Latin Hits	Charly Records	Cierra Los Ojos Y Juntos Recordemos / Páginas Del Alma / Amnesia (Album Tracks)
2006	Cinco De Mayo Fiesta	Charly Records	Cierra Los Ojos Y Juntos Recordemos (From Floreciendo!)
2007	Canciones De Amor (Love Songs)	Sony Music Latin	El Amor (From Luz de Luna)
2009	Tito El Bambino El Patrón	Siente Music	El Amor (Tito El Bambino song) [Duet With Tito El Bambino And Mash-up with El Amor (From Luz de Luna)]
2013	Frente A Frente Con José Feliciano	Sony Music Latin	Quítame Ese Hombre Del Corazón / Luz De Luna / Como Lo Hago Yo / Serás Mío / Débil (Album Tracks)
2013	Frente A Frente Con Sophy	Sony Music Latin	El Amor / Al Ritmo De La Fantasía / Débil / Este Amor Que Hay Que Callar / Como Lo Hago Yo (Album Tracks)
2013	Canciones De Amor… Con Las Reinas	Sony Music Latin	Contigo (From Laberinto de Amor)
2013	Canciones De Amor… En Boleros	Sony Music Latin	Sin Amor (From Portfolio)
2014	Simplemente… Exitos Baladas	Sony Music Latin	Débil (From Vivencias)
2014	Simplemente… Exitos Puerto Rico	Sony Music Latin	El Amor (From Luz de Luna)
2014	Yo Soy Boricua… Pá Que Tú Lo Sepa	Sony Music Latin	Borinqueña (From Vivencias)
2015	Puerto Rico… Los Número 1	J&N Records	Cierra Los Ojos Y Juntos Recordemos (From Floreciendo!)
2016	Humberto Ramírez: Bohemia Jazz	CD Baby	Cuando Vuelva A Tu Lado
2017	Dos X Uno: Carmita Jiménez & Yolandita Monge	J&N Records	Cierra Los Ojos Y Juntos Recordemos / Cuando Estemos Lejos / Adiós Amor Adiós / Alguién A quién Se Amó De Más / No Soy Esa / Una Sonrisa Una Lágrima / Un Ser Muy Triste / Cada Noche Mía / La Vida En Un Segundo / Te Llevo Conmigo (From Floreciendo!)
2017	Clásico De Clásicos	J&N Records	Cierra Los Ojos Y Juntos Recordemos (From Floreciendo!)
2020	Tres Grandes De Puerto Rico	Tigueraso Records	Como Lo Hago Yo / El Amor / Quítame Ese Hombre Del Corazón / Este Amor Que Hay Que Caller (Album Tracks)
2020	Voces De Puerto Rico	Tigueraso Records	Quítame Ese Hombre Del Corazón (From Vivencias)
2020	Anthony Ríos Boleros	O Entertainment	Oportunidad Perdida (Duet With Anthony Ríos)
2020	Anthony Ríos En Vivo	O Entertainment	Oportunidad Perdida (90's Version - En Vivo) (Duet With Anthony Ríos) / Oportunidad Perdida (En Vivo) (Duet With Anthony Ríos)
2021	Ellas, Mujeres En La Música	Popular Inc.	Esas No Son de Allí aka Cuchiflitos
2022	Gilberto Santa Rosa Debut Y Segunda Tanda	B2B Music	Si Te Cansaste De Mi (Duet With Gilberto Santa Rosa)

== Music videos ==
Year	Album title	Record label	Notes
1989	Vivencias	CBS Records	VHS

== Soundtracks ==
Year	Album title	Record label	Featured Songs
1991	Pobre Diabla: Los Exitos De la Telenovela	Sony Discos	Este Amor Que Hay Que Callar (From Vivencias)
1992	Goya…Una Vida Hecha Canción	Sony Discos	Seguir Adelante
1997	La Viuda de Blanco	RTI International	Cuando En Uno Somos Dos (Duet With Osvaldo Ríos) (unreleased as single)
1997	Si Nos Dejan	Sony Discos	Quítame A Ese Hombre Del Corazón (From Vivencias)

== Singles ==
Year	Song title	Chart	Peak
1987	Ahora Ahora	Hot Latin Tracks	7
1987	Contigo	Hot Latin Tracks	17
1987	Laberinto	Hot Latin Tracks	16
1988	Eres Mágico	Hot Latin Tracks	25
1988	Nunca Te Diré Adiós	Hot Latin Tracks	21
1988	Este Amor Que Hay Que Callar	Hot Latin Tracks	3
1989	Borinqueña	Hot Latin Tracks	4
1989	Débil	Hot Latin Tracks	18
1989	Quítame Ese Hombre Del Corazón	Hot Latin Tracks	12
1989	Por Tí	Hot Latin Tracks	6
1989	Acaricíame	Hot Latin Tracks	37
1990	Sin Amor	Hot Latin Tracks	14
1990	Fuiste Un Sueño	Hot Latin Tracks	23
1990	Cantaré	Hot Latin Tracks	27
1990	No Me Acostumbro	Hot Latin Tracks	36
1992	Sobreviviré	Hot Latin Tracks	13
1992	Vivire Sin Tí	Hot Latin Tracks	23
1992	Cara De Angel	Hot Latin Tracks	19
1993	Entrega Total	Hot Latin Tracks	23
1994	Como Puedes	Hot Latin Tracks	21
1994	Me Sorprendió La Luna	Hot Latin Tracks	24
1995	Tu, Tu, Tu, Tu	Hot Latin Tracks	17
1995	Tu, Tu, Tu, Tu	Latin Pop Airplay	4
1995	Tu, Tu, Tu, Tu	Latin Tropical Airplay	15
1996	Antes De Ti	Latin Pop Airplay	10
1997	Yo Solamente	Latin Tropical Airplay	18
1997	Susususubir	Hot Latin Tracks	25
1997	Susususubir	Latin Pop Airplay	9
1997	Susususubir	Latin Tropical Airplay	5
1999	Arriesgaré La Piel	Hot Latin Tracks	27
1999	Arriesgaré La Piel	Latin Pop Airplay	13
1999	Dime	Hot Latin Tracks	14
1999	Dime	Latin Pop Airplay	5
1999	Dime	Latin Tropical Airplay	13
2002	Te Vine A Buscar	Hot Latin Tracks	24
2007	Y Todavía	Hot Latin Tracks	26
2007	Demasiado Fuerte	Not Available	N/A
2008	Mala	Hot Latin Tracks	29
2012	Verás Dolor	Not Available	N/A
2015	Sin Tí	Not Available	N/A
