= Sin Ti (Yolandita Monge song) =

Single by Yolandita Monge
- Released: May 27, 2015
- Recorded: 2015
- Genre: Latin pop
- Length: 4:12
- Label: Southhill Production Corp.
- Songwriter(s): Las Diego
- Producer(s): José Luis Pagán

Yolandita Monge singles chronology
"Verás Dolor" (2013)	"Sin Ti" (2015)

"Sin Ti" is the first digital independent single from Yolandita Monge since the release of the studio album Más Para Dar in 2012. The song was written by her longtime friends and songwriters Las Diego (María Teresa and María Luisa Diego) and was produced by Jose Luis Pagán, responsible for the previous albums Demasiado Fuerte, Mala, and Más Para Dar. This indie release is a love tribute to her late husband Carlos 'Topy' Mamery and marks her triumphant return to the music scene.

A heartfelt music video was filmed at the Theater of the University of Puerto Rico, which is available to view at YouTube and other internet sites.

== Tour ==
The song was performed live at the concert "Latidos de mi Corazón" on September 20, 2015. On May 28, 2016, she presented the concert "Latidos de mi Corazón" at the Lehman Center for the Performing Arts in New York. Monge has not performed the song ever since in her subsequent concerts.
