= Nunca Te Diré Adiós / En Concierto =

Live album by Yolandita Monge
- Released: 1988
- Recorded: October 16–18, 1987 San Juan & Live In New York
- Genre: Latin pop
- Label: CBS Records / ARDC Music Division/Diamante
- Producer: Challenger Entertainment / Y and B Music Corporation

Yolandita Monge chronology
Laberinto de Amor (1987)	Nunca Te Diré Adiós / En Concierto (1988)	Vivencias (1988)

Nunca Te Diré Adiós / En Concierto is the first live album by the Puerto Rican singer Yolandita Monge. It was released in 1988 and it includes the studio version of the theme of the Puerto Rican telenovela, Ave de Paso, for which she played lead. The rest of the album is the partial live concert held at Teatro Puerto Rico, New York, on October 16, 17, & 18, 1987.

The track "Nunca Te Diré Adiós", was written for Monge by longtime collaborator and friend Lou Briel. On this concert, Monge performed several songs from other artists including "Escenario" (also written by Briel), "He Vuelto" which is the Spanish translation of Pat Benatar's hit Shadows of the Night, and "Le Lo Lai" from José Feliciano.

This album is out of print in all formats.

== Track listing ==
Track	Title	Songwriter(s)	Original Version(s) Taken From The Album(s)
1	"Nunca Te Diré Adiós"	Lou Briel	New Studio Track
2	"Introduction" / "He Vuelto" (Shadows Of The Night)	D. L. Byron, Lou Briel	Spanish translation of Shadows of the Night
3	"Recuérdame"	Héctor Garrido, R. Caisedo	Recuérdame
4	"Cierra Los Ojos Y Juntos Recordemos"	Eduardo Franco	Floreciendo!
5	"La Distancia"	Anthony Ríos	Sueños
6	"Señor.. Del Pasado"	Yolandita Monge, Lou Briel	Luz de Luna
7	"Le Lo Lai"	José Feliciano, Rudy Pérez, Susan Feliciano	
8	"Te Agradezco"	Carlos Colla, Mauricio Duboc, L. A. Ferri	Laberinto de Amor
9	"Escenario"	Lou Briel	
10	"El Amor"	Rafael Pérez Botija	Luz de Luna

== Credits and personnel ==
- Vocals: Yolandita Monge
- Artistic Production: Y and B Music Corporation

== Notes ==
- Track listing and credits from album cover.
- Released in Cassette Format on 1988 (DIC-10516).
- Re-released digitally by ARDC Music Division/Diamante on March 21, 2018 as "En Concierto '87" along with bonus tracks.

== Charts ==
=== Albums charts ===
Year	Chart	Peak
1988	Billboard Latin Pop Albums	13

=== Singles charts ===
Year	Chart	Song	Peak
1988	Billboard Hot Latin Songs	Nunca te Diré Adiós	21
