= En Su Intimidad =

Studio album by Yolandita Monge
- Released: 1978
- Recorded: Buenos Aires, Argentina
- Genre: Latin pop
- Label: Coco Records / Musical Productions /Charly
- Producer: Enrique Méndez

Yolandita Monge chronology
Soy Ante Todo Mujer (1977)	En Su Intimidad (1978)	Estilo y Personalidad (1979)

En Su Intimidad (In Your Privacy) is the tenth (10th) studio album by Puerto Rican singer Yolandita Monge. It was released in 1978 on LP, 8-Track and Cassette format and was her last studio album under the now defunct label Coco Records. Two years later, she was signed by the international label CBS Records, now Sony Music.

The album is available as a digital download at iTunes and Amazon, as well as several hits songs also appear in various compilations of the singer available on such media platforms. Coco Records/Charly re-released the album in November 2020 as a digital download, also available at iTunes and Amazon. The album was released on CD for the first time in June 2022.

== Track listing ==
Track	Title	Composer(s)	Duration
1	"El Mundo Fue De Dos"	Eduardo Franco	3:30
2	"Amor De Otro Amor"	Rubén Lotes	3:04
3	"Me Faltó Tiempo"	Rubén Lotes	2:45
4	"Es"	Enrique Chia	3:09
5	"Desagradecido"	Facundo Cabral	2:09
6	"Cuando Te Asomes Al Amor"	Alberto Cortéz	4:09
7	"Quiero Empezar El Olvido"	Pedro Fabini-Valles	3:25
8	"Tu Cariño"	Catulo Castillo, Alfredo Malerba	3:37
9	"Amnesia"	Dino Ramos, Chico Novarro	2:57

== Credits and personnel ==
- Vocals: Yolandita Monge
- Producer: Enrique Méndez
- Arrangements: Osvaldo Requena
- Sound Engineering: Jorge Beren
- Mastering: José Rodríguez
- Photography: Joche Dávila
- Album Design: Jorge Vargas

== Notes ==
- Track listing and credits from album cover.
- Re-released digitally by Musical Productions on Nov 3, 2008.
- Re-released digitally by Coco Records/Charly in December 2020.
- Re-released on CD by Coco Records in June 2022.
