= Reflexiones =

Reflexiones may refer:

- Reflexiones (Yolandita Monge album), a 1976 album by Yolandita Monge.
- Reflexiones (José José album), a 1984 album by José José.
