= Parece Fantasia =

Parece Fantasía

Studio album by Yolandita Monge
- Released: 1972
- Genre: Latin pop
- Label: Teca Records / Disco Hit Productions
- Producer: Héctor Garrido

Yolandita Monge chronology
La Personalidad (1971)	Parece Fantasía (1972)	Yo Soy (1973)

Parece Fantasía (Looks Like Fantasy) is the fourth studio album by Puerto Rican singer Yolandita Monge. In 1972, Monge recorded this album which contains the radio hits "La Voz Del Silencio" and "Dos Caminos Diferentes".

The album was re-issued in 1987 and again in the 1990s by the label Disco Hit in cassette format.

== Track listing ==
Track	Title	Composer(s)
1	"Parece Fantasía"	Héctor Garrido, Rómulo Caicedo
2	"Como Tu Quieras Será"	Héctor Garrido
3	"Nunca"	Cuty De Cárdenas
4	"No Te Odiaré"	Luisito Rey
5	"Dos Caminos Diferentes"	Héctor Garrido
6	"La Voz Del Silencio" (Spanish version of Silent Voices)	Paolo Limiti, Mogol, Elio Isola, Alice Gracia
7	"A Donde Muere El Sol"	Polo Márquez
8	"Que Injusticia"	Rafael Hernández
9	"Amor Vuelve Otra Vez"	Cacho Pomar
10	"Bailando Samba"	Cacho Pomar

== Credits and personnel ==
- Vocals: Yolandita Monge
- Producer: Héctor Garrido
- Musical Direction and Arrangements: Héctor Garrido

== Notes ==
- Track listing and credits from album cover.
- Re-released in Cassette Format by Disco Hit Productions/Aponte Latin Music Distribution (DHC-1643)
