= Siento (Yolandita Monge album) =

Studio album by Yolandita Monge
- Released: Apr 27, 1999
- Recorded: 1998–1999; Miami
- Genre: Latin pop
- Label: BMG U.S. Latin / YM Music
- Producer: Ricardo Eddy Martínez

Yolandita Monge chronology
Mi Encuentro (1997)	Siento (1999)	Yolandita (2000)

Siento (I Feel) is the twenty-third studio album by Puerto Rican singer Yolandita Monge. It was released in 1999 with her new recording contract with BMG U.S. Latin. With this album the singer returned to her usual strong melodramatic ballads along with producer Ricardo Eddy Martínez from Vivencias. It includes the radio hit "Dime", as well as the dance single "Mala Sangre". The sales exceeded 50.000 copies, earning Gold status. The album is currently out of print in all formats, but it was finally released in 2023 as a digital download at iTunes and Amazon.

== Track listing ==
Track	Title	Composer(s)
1	"Los Celos"	Mercy Martínez
2	"Dime"	Guadalupe García, Laura Reyes
3	"Vibraciones Positivas"	Pachy López
4	"A Veces El Amor Se Desintegra"	Mercy Martínez
5	"Ya No Hay Amor"	Jorge Luis Piloto
6	"Mala Sangre (No Podrán Conmigo)"	José María Purón
7	"Como Lluvia De Los Cielos"	Guadalupe García, Laura Reyes
8	"No Es Natural"	Jorge Luis Piloto
9	"Arriesgaré La Piel"	Joel Henríquez
10	"Ayer Te Ví"	R. Gandía
11	"Prohibido"	Mercy Martínez
12	"Libre"	Mercy Martínez, Ricardo Eddy Martínez

== Credits and personnel ==
- Vocals: Yolandita Monge
- Producer: Ricardo Eddy Martínez
- Arrangements, Programming & Keyboards: Ricardo Eddy Martínez
- Guitars: René Luis Toledo
- Sax Tenor: Ed Calle
- Chorus: Rita Quintero, Wendy Pedersen, Tommy Anthony
- Strings: Miami Symphonic Strings by Alfredo Oliva
- Violins: Alfredo Oliva, Mei Mei Luo, Scott Flavin, Orlando Forté, Robert Rozek, Joane Faigen, Gennady Aronin, Huifang Chen, Laszlo Pap, Gustavo Correa, John DiPuccio, Rafael Elvira
- Violas: Tim Barnes, Richard, Flieschman, Debra Spring, Yang Xi
- Cellos: Claudio Jaffe, Chris Glansdorp
- Recording Engineers: Mike Couzzi, Víctor Di Persia
- Assistants: Juan González
- Mixing: Mike Couzzi
- Recorded: Ocean Vu, Miami; Fullersound, Miami
- Mastering & Editing: Master Media Studio
- Engineers: Frank Cesarano
- Photography: Fernando Báez
- Hair & Make-Up: Fernando Báez
- Cover Design: Arte Gráfico Y...

== Notes ==
- Track listing and credits from album booklet.
- Released in Cassette Format on 1999 (74321-66977-4).
- Released digitally by YM Music on September 29, 2023.

== Charts ==
=== Album ===
Chart (1999)	Peak position
US Top Latin Albums (Billboard)	19
US Latin Pop Albums (Billboard)	8

=== Singles ===
Year	Chart	Song	Peak
1999	Billboard Hot Latin Songs	Dime	14
1999	Billboard Latin Pop Airplay	Dime	5
1999	Billboard Latin Tropical/Salsa Airplay	Dime	13
1999	Billboard Latin Pop Airplay	Mala Sangre	34
1999	Billboard Latin Pop Airplay	Arriesgaré la Piel	13
1999	Billboard Hot Latin Songs	Arriesgaré la Piel	27
