= Fiebre =

Fiebre may refer to:

== Music ==
- La Fiebre, an American band
- "Fiebre" (song), by Ricky Martin, 2018
- "Fiebre", a song by Yolandita Monge from Fiebre de Luna, 1994
- "Fiebre", a song by Bad Gyal from Slow Wine Mixtape, 2016
- "Fiebre", by David Bisbal, 2016

== Cinema ==
- Fever (1943 film), a 1943 Italian-Spanish drama film by Primo Zeglio, titled Fiebre in Spanish
- Fiebre (film), a 1971 Argentine sexploitation film by Armando Bó
