= Mi Mejor Regalo =

Mi Mejor Regalo may refer to:

- Mi Mejor Regalo (Yolandita Monge album), 1992
- Mi Mejor Regalo (Charlie Zaa album), 2015
