= Soy Ante Todo Mujer =

Studio album by Yolandita Monge
- Released: 1977
- Recorded: Buenos Aires, Argentina
- Genre: Latin pop
- Label: Coco Records / Musical Productions / Charly
- Producer: Enrique Méndez

Yolandita Monge chronology
Reflexiones (1976)	Soy Ante Todo Mujer (1977)	En Su Intimidad (1978)

Soy Ante Todo Mujer (I Am Above All Woman) is the ninth (9th) studio album by Puerto Rican singer Yolandita Monge released in 1977 on LP, 8-Track and Cassette format.

The album was re-issued in 1990 by Musical Productions in CD format with a different cover picture and artwork. Such re-issue is available as a digital download at Amazon, as well as several hits songs also appear in various compilations of the singer available on such media platforms. Coco Records/Charly re-released the album in October 2020 as a digital download at iTunes and Amazon with the original LP artwork.

== Track listing ==
Track	Title	Composer(s)	Duration
1	"Déjame Que Pague Yo"	Rúben Lotes, Oscar Vázquez	2:38
2	"En El Mismo Lugar"	Rúben Lotes, Justiniano Orquera	3:42
3	"De Igual A Igual"	D.R.	2:35
4	"Ahora Que El Tiempo Ha Pasado"	Rúben Lotes, Justiniano Orquera	2:35
5	"Canción Para Una Hija"	Luciano Cardona Sandoval	4:34
6	"Soy Ante Todo Mujer"	Rúben Lotes, Santiago Correa	2:51
7	"Yo Soy Una Más"	Rubén Lotes, Santiago Correa, Diego Verdaguer	3:36
8	"Un Gran Amor Lo Hacen Dos"	Rubén Lotes, Justiniano Orquera, Diego Verdaguer	2:56
9	"Solo Fui Un Capricho"	Rúben Lotes, Rodolfo DeForte	3:19
10	"Entregué Mi Vida"	Rúben Lotes, Justiniano Orquera	2:11

== Credits and personnel ==
- Vocals: Yolandita Monge
- Producer: Enrique Méndez
- Arrangements & Recording Director: Raúl Parentella
- Mastering: José Rodríguez
- Recorded: Ion Recording Studios, Buenos Aires, Argentina, February 1977
- Art Direction & Design: Hal. Wilson
- Cover Photography: Cándido Ortiz
- Backliner Photography: Dominique

== Notes ==
- Track listing and credits from album cover.
- Re-released in CD Format by Musical Productions on 1990 (MP-3139CD) under license of The Note Records & Tapes, Inc.
- Re-released digitally by Musical Productions on May 30, 2006.
- Re-released digitally by Coco Records/Charly in October 2020.
