= Vivencias (video) =

Video by Yolandita Monge
- Released: 1989
- Recorded: 1988
- Genre: Music Video
- Length: 45 mins
- Label: CBS Records

Vivencias is a video album by Puerto Rican singer Yolandita Monge. It was released in 1989 and includes performances of all the tracks of the studio album Vivencias. Three of the songs from this special music video ("Este Amor Que Hay Que Callar", "Débil", and "Quítame A Ese Hombre Del Corazón") were re-released in 2007 in DVD format along with the Demasiado Fuerte album.

== Track listing ==
Track	Title	Songwriter(s)	Length
1	"Borinqueña"	Rudy Pérez	04:04
2	"Este Amor Que Hay Que Callar"	Braulio A. García	04:45
3	"Tiempo Perdido"	Jeannie Cruz	03:08
4	"Todo A Pulmón"	Alejandro Lerner	03:52
5	"El Reto"	Rudy Pérez, Mario Patiño	04:19
6	"Cuando Termina Un Amor"	Riccardo Cocciante	04:26
7	"Por Tí" (Call Me)	Giorgio Spagna, Alfredo Larry Pignagnoli, Ivana Spagna, Rudy Pérez	03:34
8	"Quítame A Ese Hombre Del Corazón"	Jorge Luis Piloto	04:21
9	"Débil"	Rudy Pérez, Omar Sánchez	04:27
10	"Acaríciame" (Sei Bellissima)	Claudio Daiano, Gian Pietro Felisatti, Lou Briel	04:19

=== Format ===
It was released on VHS in an aspect ratio of 1.33:1.

== Credits and personnel ==
- Yolandita Monge – singer, performer
