= Recuérdame (Yolandita Monge album) =

Studio album by Yolandita Monge
- Released: 1971
- Genre: Latin pop
- Label: Teca Records / Disco Hit Productions

Yolandita Monge chronology
La Personalidad de Yolandita Monge (1971)	Recuérdame (1971)	Yo Soy (1973)

Recuérdame (Remember Me) is the third studio album by Puerto Rican singer Yolandita Monge. In 1971, the singer temporarily established in México, where she recorded three albums for Teca Records. It was released in 1971 and contains the radio hit "Recuérdame".

The album was re-issued in the early 1990s by the label Disco Hit in cassette format.

== Track listing ==
Track	Title	Songwriter(s)
1	"Tu No Crees Más"	Rómulo Caicedo
2	"Alegría"	D.R.
3	"Campanitas"	L. Godoy, C. Fabré
4	"Esperando"	Alice Gracia
5	"Beisbol"	L. Godoy, F. Farello
6	"Recuérdame"	Héctor Garrido, Rómulo Caicedo
7	"La Chiapaneca"	D.R.
8	"Entonces"	Héctor Garido, Rómulo Caicedo
9	"Siempre Fuimos Compañeros"	Alex Donald
10	"Super-Pitagórico"	Armando Manzanero

== Notes ==
- Vocals: Yolandita Monge
- Track listing and credits from album cover.
- Re-released in cassette format by Disco Hit Productions/Aponte Latin Music Distribution (DHC-1624)
