= Fiebre de Luna =

Studio album by Yolandita Monge
- Released: Feb 04, 1994
- Recorded: 1993
- Genre: Latin pop
- Label: WEA-Latina
- Producer: Las Diego, Rudy Pérez & Steve Roitstein

Yolandita Monge chronology
Mi Mejor Regalo (1992)	Fiebre de Luna (1994)	Yolandita (1995)

Fiebre de Luna (Moon Fever) is the twentieth studio album by Puerto Rican singer Yolandita Monge. It was released in 1994 and includes the radio hits "A Pesar Del Tiempo", "Como Puedes", and "Dime Cuando".

The album marked a change of image for the singer and a mature sound that included a bachata track, "Me Sorprendió La Luna". It marked the return to the heavy melodramatic lyrics of past albums but with modern arrangements, leaving behind the early 1990s style of production from Pablo Manavello and Ricardo Montaner. Monge once again worked with producer Rudy Perez, of Vivencias, along with songwriters Las Diego and Miami producer Steve Roitstein. This was the second time that Monge recorded songs from Las Diego, after the track "Contigo" from Laberinto de Amor in 1987. The album's cover picture by late photographer and stylist Raúl Torres was the last one done for the singer.

The release earned Gold status in Puerto Rico.

== Track listing ==
Track	Title	Composer(s)	Arrangements	Length(s)
01	"A Pesar Del Tiempo"	Las Diego	Ricardo Eddy Martínez	05:07
02	"Dime Cuando"	Rudy Pérez	Steve Roitstein	04:49
03	"El"	Las Diego, Rudy Pérez	Lester Méndez	05:14
04	"Como Puedes"	Las Diego	Eddie Montilla	04:53
05	"Te Extraño"	Las Diego	Steve Roitstein	03:50
06	"Todo Por Dolor"	Rudy Pérez	Lester Méndez, Rudy Pérez, Rafael Ferro	04:50
07	"Me Sorprendió La Luna"	Frank Falcón	Manuel Tejada	05:27
08	"Prohibido"	Las Diego	Steve Roitstein	04:47
09	"Tú"	Las Diego	Steve Roitstein	04:31
10	"Fiebre"	Rudy Pérez, Lester Méndez	Lester Méndez	05:26

== Credits and personnel ==
- Vocals: Yolandita Monge
- Producers: Las Diego, Rudy Pérez, Steve Roitstein
- Executive Producer: Carlos 'Topy' Mamery
- Choral Arrangements on 'El' and 'Fiebre': Rudy Pérez
- Choral Arrangements on 'A Pesar Del Tiempo', 'Tu", 'Te Extraño' and 'Me Sorprendió La Luna': Las Diego
- Chorus: Geannie Cruz, Wendy Petersen, George Noriega, Rita Quintero, Angie Chirino, Marcos Hernández
- Guitars: René Luis Toledo, Manuel López
- Sax: Ed Calle
- Harmonica & Trombone: Steve Roitstein
- Violins: Jorge Orbón, Bodgan Chrvszcz, Jerry Miller, Gustavo Correa, Eddy Martínez, José Montoto, Alfredo Molina, Bob Basso, Phillip Tempkins, Arthur Grossman
- Cellos: Barbara Corcillo, Phil Lakofsky, Dan Petrescy, Steve Gigurdson
- Violas: David Chappel, Tim Barnes
- Sound Engineers: Ron Taylor, Will Tartak, Mike Couzzi, Ted Stein, John Haag, Rudy Pérez, Eric taveras
- Assistants: Andrew Roshberg, José martínez, Chris Carol, Greg Schwabe, Rick Raymond
- Recorded: Criteria Studios, Miami, Midland Studios, Miami, International Sounds, Miami, Midlab, Santo Domingo
- Wardrobe: Roy Longsworth, Oui Boutique, El Imperio Salón, Valentina
- Hair & Make-up: Raúl Torres
- Stylist: Patricia De La Torre
- Model: Juan Carlos Rosario
- Art & Design: Juan Carlos Medina
- Art Consultant: Stephen Lumel
- Art Supervisor: Magda Mena
- Photography and Art Concept: Raúl Torres

== Notes ==
- Track listing and credits from album booklet.
- Released in Cassette Format on 1994 (95168-4).
- Released digitally by WEA-Latina on January 18, 2011.

== Charts ==
=== Singles ===
Year	Track	Chart	Peak
1994	A Pesar del Tiempo	US Hot Latin Songs (Billboard)	8
1994	Como Puedes	US Hot Latin Songs (Billboard)	21
1994	Me Sorprendió la Luna	US Hot Latin Songs (Billboard)	24
