= Cara de Ángel =

Studio album by Yolandita Monge
- Released: May 12, 1992
- Recorded: Miami
- Genre: Latin pop
- Label: WEA-Latina / ARDC Music Division
- Producer: Pablo Manavello

Yolandita Monge chronology
Mis Canciones Preferidas 2 (1991)	Cara de Ángel (1992)	Mi Mejor Regalo (1992)

Cara de Ángel (Angel Face) is the eighteenth (18th) studio album by Puerto Rican singer Yolandita Monge. It was the singer's first studio album for WEA-Latina and was released in 1992. Once again Venezuelan singer/songwriter Ricardo Montaner was involved in the songwriting of some of the songs. It includes the radio hits "Sobreviviré", "Entrega Total", "Angel Caído" and the club hit "Viviré Sin Tí". The album's cover picture was taken by late photographer and stylist Raúl Torres and is a black and white picture, later color painted.

The song "Viviré Sin Tí" was remixed by DJs Pablo Flores and Javier Garza, and became a club hit in Puerto Rico and USA. This song marked the fourth consecutive dance club hit for the singer. Monge filmed very stylish music videos for the tracks "Sobreviviré" and "'Viviré Sin Tí". The singer also filmed a TV Special performing five of the album's tracks, that aired before the album's release. Monge performed twelve sold-out concerts at Centro de Bellas Artes in 1992 and set a record for any female performer at the venue.

This album features the musical pop tendencies at the time, moving away from the melodramatic lyrics and arrangements of past productions from the 80's. This is also an album that created high expectations because it was her return to music after a temporary hiatus due to her third pregnancy, Imanol Mamery. The album also represents the first release under her new record label WEA-Latina, after 12 years with CBS Records (Sony Music). Said contract was one of the most lucrative for any Puerto Rican female singer at the time.

The first printing of this album included an alternate version of the title track in place of the song "Angel Caído". The second printing corrected the "mistake" and included the missing track. This first printing of the CD is a sought after collector's item to many die hard fans. This album earned Gold, Platinum and Double Platinum status and is currently out of print in all formats.

On April 11, 2020, the singer uploaded on her YouTube channel the song "Abrázame", an unreleased track recorded during these sessions.

== Track listing ==
Track	Title	Composer(s)
1	"Sobreviviré"	Daniel Recalde, Rodolfo Castillo, Vlady Tosetto
2	"Un Día Feliz"	Ricardo Montaner, Pablo Manavello
3	"Podrás Decir Te Amo"	Pablo Manavello, Cecilio Perrozzi
4	"Viviré Sin Tí"	Pablo Manavello, Alexis Peña
5	"Entrega Total"	Daniel Recalde, Pablo Manavello
6	"Angel Caído"	Riccardo Cocciante
7	"Cualquiera No"	Rodolfo Castillo, Pablo Manavello
8	"Cara De Angel"	Marivana Viscuso, Pablo Manavello, Rodolfo Castillo
9	"Salte De Mi Vida"	Rodolfo Castillo, Pablo Manavello
10	"Entre Mil Pasos"	Pablo Manavello, Alexis Peña

== Credits and personnel ==
- Vocals: Yolandita Monge
- Producer: Pablo Manavello
- Musical Arrangements: Iker Gastaminza and Pablo Manavello
- Additional Production and Remix on "Viviré Sin Tí" by Pablo Flores and Javier Garza for Hits ' n' Mixes Productions
- Programming & Keyboards: Iker Gastaminza
- Brass Arrangements: Iker Gastaminza and Pablo Manavello
- Chorus Arrangements: Pablo Manavello
- Guitars: Pablo Manavello
- Keyboards on 'Cara De Angel': Léstor Méndez
- Guitar Solo on 'Entre Mil Pasos' and 'Cualquiera No': David Lebón
- Sax Solo on 'Podrás Decir Te Amo', Entrega Total' and 'Viviré Sin Tí': Ed Calle
- Brass: Tony Concepción (trumpet), Ed Calle (sax), Dana Teboe (trombone)
- Chorus: Georgina Cruz, Rita Quintero, Mario Inchausti and Willie Pérez Fria
- Recorded & Mixed: Black Cat Studio, Miami
- Engineer: Keith Morrison
- Brass & Vocals Recorded on: Midiland, Miami
- Vocal Engineer: Carlos Nieto
- Mastering: Bernie Grundman Studios
- Assistants: Jim Thomas, Gary Bosko, Riley J. Cornell
- Photography and Art Concept: Raúl Torres
- Graphic Design: Edwin Crespo
- Hair & Make-up: Raúl Torres

== Notes ==
- Track listing and credits from album booklet.
- Released in Cassette Format on 1992 (77467–4).
- Released digitally by ARDC Music Division on November 1, 2017, with the track listing in different order and a revised cover picture.

== Track listing (2017 iTunes Version) ==
Track	Title	Composer(s)
1	"Un Día Feliz"	Ricardo Montaner, Pablo Manavello
2	"Cara De Angel"	Marivana Viscuso, Pablo Manavello, Rodolfo Castillo
3	"Entrega Total"	Daniel Recalde, Pablo Manavello
4	"Angel Caído"	Riccardo Cocciante
5	"Cualquiera No"	Rodolfo Castillo, Pablo Manavello
6	"Entre Mil Pasos"	Pablo Manavello, Alexis Peña
7	"Sobreviviré"	Daniel Recalde, Rodolfo Castillo, Vlady Tosetto
8	"Salte De Mi Vida"	Rodolfo Castillo, Pablo Manavello
9	"Viviré Sin Tí"	Pablo Manavello, Alexis Peña
10	"Podrás Decir Te Amo"	Pablo Manavello, Cecilio Perrozzi

== Charts ==
Year	Chart	Album	Peak
1992	Billboard Top Latin Pop Albums	Cara de Ángel	6
1993	Billboard Top Latin Pop Albums	Antología Musical Vol. 1	15

=== Singles ===
Year	Chart	Song	Peak
1992	Billboard Hot Latin Songs	Sobreviviré	13
1992	Billboard Hot Latin Songs	Viviré Sin Ti	23
1992	Billboard Hot Latin Songs	Cara de Ángel	19
1993	Billboard Hot Latin Songs	Entrega Total	23
