= Más Para Dar =

Studio album by Yolandita Monge
- Released: November 13, 2012
- Recorded: Miami
- Genre: Latin pop
- Length: 36:33
- Label: Roma Entertainment / Select-O-Hits, Inc.
- Producer: José Luis Pagán

Yolandita Monge chronology
Mala (2008)	Más Para Dar (2012)

Singles from Más Para Dar
- 1. "Verás Dolor" Released: August 22, 2012

Más Para Dar (More to Give) is the twenty-seventh and last studio album by Puerto Rican singer Yolandita Monge and her first release in over four years. The album was released on November 13, 2012. It contains nine new songs co-written by Monge, the first time in the singer's career that she composes an entire album. The release follows the same musical and lyrical style as her previous studio albums Demasiado Fuerte and Mala and was produced by Jose Luis Pagán.

The album is a balanced effort, one that mixes pop and rock with the instant highlights "Ahora Vivo Si Tu Amor" and the electro-fueled single "Vivo Por Tí", which get a moving acoustic reading later in the album. "Desde Que Te Perdí" is both a slow builder and slow burner, with layers of guitars and strings supporting Monge's expressive and powerful voice. "Verás Dolor" and "Y Aquí Me Ves De Pie" prove that the singer's emotional delivery is better than ever. The title track "Más Para Dar" is a beautiful song about second chances in love and life.

Más Para Dar finds Monge going the indie route by releasing it in her own imprint, Roma Entertainment.

== Track listing ==
Track	Title	Composer(s)	Duration
1	"Ahora Vivo Sin Tu Amor"	Yolandita Monge, José Luis Pagán	3:09
2	"Vivo Por Tí"	Yolandita Monge, José Luis Pagán	4:06
3	"Desde Que Te Perdí"	Yolandita Monge, José Luis Pagán	3:36
4	"Y Aquí Me Ves De Pie"	Yolandita Monge, José Luis Pagán	3:20
5	"Verás Dolor"	Yolandita Monge, José Luis Pagán	3:51
6	"Más Para Dar"	Yolandita Monge, José Luis Pagán	3:50
7	"Vivo Por Tí" (Acoustic Version)	Yolandita Monge, José Luis Pagán	3:36
8	"Hoy No Será Un Día Más"	Yolandita Monge, José Luis Pagán	3:37
9	"No Más Pena"	Yolandita Monge, José Luis Pagán	3:46
10	"Eres Tú"	Yolandita Monge, José Luis Pagán	3:46

== Personnel ==
- Vocals: Yolandita Monge
- Keyboards: José Luis Pagán
- Bass: Victor Sierra
- Guitar: José Luis Pagán
- Drums: Paul Vottler, Hernan Marchesi
- Percussion: Daniel Rotundo

=== Production ===
- Producer: José Luis Pagán
- Mastering: Sound Nuts Studios by Diego Acosta
- Recorded and Mixed: Ultra Pop Studios, Sound Nuts Studios by José Luis Pagán and Diego Acosta
- Photography and graphic designs: Eric Stella
- Stylist: Mayra Moreno
- Makeup: Mayra Moreno

== Notes ==
- Track listing and credits from album booklet.

== Charts ==
Chart (2012)	Peak position
US Top Latin Albums (Billboard)	2
US Latin Pop Albums (Billboard)	1

== Tour ==
Más Para Dar Tour
- Tour by Yolandita Monge
- Associated album: Más Para Dar
- Start date: February 14, 2013
- End date: August 31, 2013
- Legs: 1
- No. of shows: 5 in North America; 5 Total

Yolandita Monge concert chronology
- Mala Tour (2009); Más Para Dar Tour (2013)

Más Para Dar Tour (also referred to as Más Para Dar El Concierto) is the concert tour by Yolandita Monge in support of her studio album Más Para Dar. Beginning in the Dominican Republic, this concert tour will visit cities in the United States, Puerto Rico and Latin America. In the concerts at Santo Domingo, Yolandita will share stage with Danny Rivera.

=== Setlist ===
North America (San Juan, PR) Setlist
1. "A quién le importa"
2. "Mala Sangre"
3. "Mala"
4. "Ángel Caído"
5. "Y Aquí Me Ves de Pie"
6. "Acaríciame"
7. Medley: "Cuando te toque llorar" / "Yo quiero andar"
8. "Demasiado fuerte"
9. "Verás Dolor"
10. "Quítame ese hombre del corazón"
11. "Débil"
12. "Te Veo Pasar"
13. "Mágico"
14. "Este amor que hay que callar"
15. "La Distancia"
16. "Cantaré"
17. "Contigo"
18. "Sobreviviré"
19. "Dime cuándo"
20. "A pesar del tiempo"
21. "Cierra los ojos"
22. "Tanto amor"
23. "Si"
24. "Dime"
25. "Laberinto de amor"
26. "Más Para Dar"
27. "Me dijeron"
28. "Las cosas que he visto"
29. "Fuiste un sueño”
30. “No me acostumbro"
31. "Cómo puedes"
32. "El Amor"

=== Tour dates ===
Date	City	Country	Venue
North America
February 14, 2013	Santo Domingo	Dominican Republic	Hotel Jaragua
February 16, 2013	Kissimmee	United States	Osceola Performing Arts Center
March 16, 2013	San Juan	Puerto Rico	Coliseo de Puerto Rico
May 24, 2013	Guaynabo	Puerto Rico	Guaynabo Performing Arts Center
August 30, 2013	Juana Diaz	Puerto Rico	Centro Comercial Plaza

Cancellations and rescheduled shows

May 10, 2013	Guaynabo, Puerto Rico	Concha Acústica	Rescheduled to May 24, 2013 and moved to Guaynabo Performing Arts Center
