= A Star Is Shining =

A Star is Shining

Studio album by Yolandita Monge
- Released: 1970
- Genre: Latin pop
- Label: Patty Records

Yolandita Monge chronology
Puerto Rico's Poignant... Powerful... Incomparable... (1969)	A Star is Shining (1970)	La Personalidad de Yolandita Monge (1971)

A Star is Shining, Yolandita Monge Vol. 2 is the second (2nd) studio album by Puerto Rican singer Yolandita Monge and contains the radio hit "Amor En El Aire". It was released in 1970 and it is currently out of print in all media formats.

== Track listing ==
Track	Title	Composer(s)
1	"No Vale Nada”	Cacho Pomar
2	“Igualdad”	Félix A. Rivera
3	“Te Olvidaré”	Ruth Torres
4	“Se Lo Voy A Decir A Mamá”	Johnny Pelkys
5	“Monsier Dupont”	D.R.
6	“Palabras De Amor”	D.R.
7	“Realidad”	Edwin J. Oliver
8	“Un Mundo Nuevo”	Julio Rivera, Cacho Pomar
9	“Que Vida Se Da El Hippie”	Julio Rivera, Cacho Pomar
10	“Amor En El Aire"	D.R.

== Notes ==
- Vocals: Yolandita Monge
- Track listing and credits from album cover.
