= Con Todo Mi Amor =

Con Todo Mi Amor..!!

Studio album by Yolandita Monge
- Released: 1974
- Genre: Latin pop
- Length: 28:29
- Label: Teca Records / Disco Hit Productions
- Producer: Raúl Fortunato, Roberto Montiel, Larry Goday, Tito Iglesias

Yolandita Monge chronology
Yo Soy! (1973)	Con Todo Mi Amor..!! (1974)	Floreciendo! (1975)

Con Todo Mi Amor..!! (With All My Love..!!) is the sixth (6th) studio album by Puerto Rican singer Yolandita Monge and her last under Teca Records while relocated in Mexico. It was released in 1974 after Yo Soy and contains the radio hits Vete de Aquí and Porque Diste Vuelta A La Cara.

The album was re-issued in cassette format on 1987 and digitally remastered in CD format in 1992 by the label Disco Hit. It is available as a digital download at iTunes and Amazon, being her only studio album from her very early years to be available in digital platforms.

== Track listing ==
Track	Title	Composer(s)	Musical Direction & Arrangements
1	"Vete De Aquí"	Héctor Meneses	Roberto Montiel
2	"Yo Se Bien Que Tu Me Quieres"	Carmen Rimoli, Néstor Rama	Roberto Montiel
3	"A Casa No Volveré"	D.R.	Tito Iglesias
4	"Qué Soy Yo Para Ti"	D.R.	Tito Iglesias
5	"Canción Del Alma"	Rafael Hernández	Larry Godoy
6	"Porque Diste Vuelta A La Cara"	King Clave	Raúl Fortunato
7	"Van A Ser Las Diez"	Rubén Amado, Néstor Bernia	Roberto Montiel
8	"Para Olvidarme De Este Amor"	D.R.	Raúl Fortunato
9	"La Palabra De Dios"	Luis García	Roberto Montiel
10	"Sonando Con Puerto Rico"	Bobby Capó	Larry Godoy

== Credits and personnel ==
- Vocals: Yolandita Monge
- Producers: Raúl Fortunato, Roberto Montiel, Larry Goday, Tito Iglesias
- Musical Direction and Arrangements: Roberto Montiel, Tito Iglesias, Larry Godoy, Raul Fortunato
- Album Design: Visual Communications, NYC
- Art Direction: Izzy Sanabria, Chico Alvarez.

== Notes ==
- Track listing and credits from album cover.
- Re-released in Cassette Format on 1987 by Patty (Patty 1097).
- Re-released in CD Format by Disco Hit on 1992 (DHCD9124) (Digitally processed by DRS in July 1992).
- Re-released digitally by Disco Hit Productions on November 1, 2011.
