= Sexto Sentido =

Studio album by Yolandita Monge
- Released: February 26, 2002
- Genre: Latin pop
- Label: Warner Music Latina
- Producer: Kike Santander, José Gaviria, Daniel Betancourt & Alexis Grullón

Yolandita Monge chronology
Yolandita En Vivo (2000)	Sexto Sentido (2002)	Demasiado Fuerte (2007)

Sexto Sentido (Sixth Sense) is the twenty-fourth (24th) studio album by Puerto Rican singer Yolandita Monge. It was released in 2002 by Warner Music Latina and almost all its tracks were produced by Kike Santander. It marked the first time that the singer officially collaborated in an album with her daughter Noelia in the tracks "Te Vine A Buscar" and "La Luna".

The song 'La Luna' is the Spanish translation of the song by the same name originally recorded by Belinda Carlisle in 1989. Monge's daughter Noelia co-wrote it and also sings backup vocals on the track. The singer is featured in a video for the track "Te Vine A Buscar" with all of her children in the recording studio. After this release, the singer went on a lengthy five-year hiatus to focus on her acting career and to host the Variety TV show De Mujeres in Puerto Rico.

The album is currently out of print in all formats. This release has never been available as a digital download.

== Track listing ==
Track	Title	Songwriter(s)	Producer(s)	Time
1	Si Tú Te Vas	Ximena Muñoz	Kike Santander, Daniel Betancourt	4:34
2	Para Que Seguir Viviendo	Kike Santander	Kike Santander, Daniel Betancourt	3:43
3	Volveré Por Ti	Ximena Muñoz, Jose Gaviria	Kike Santander, Jose Gaviria	3:51
4	Atrapada En Un Sueño	Jaime Rovira	Kike Santander, Bernardo Ossa	4:12
5	La Luna	Ellen Shipley, Rick Nowels, Alexis Grullón, Noelia Lorenzo	Alexis Grullón	4:24
6	Me Quedo En Soledad	Rudy Pérez	Kike Santander, Bernardo Ossa, José Gaviria	3:30
7	Cuando Te Toque Llorar	Ximena Muñoz	Kike Santander, Andrés Múnera, Fernando 'Toby' Tobón	3:40
8	Que Sera de Mi	Ximena Muñoz	Kike Santander, Andrés Múnera, Fernando 'Toby' Tobón	4:15
9	Te Vine a Buscar	Alexis Grullón, Noelia Lorenzo, Pete Masitti	Alexis Grullón	4:36
10	La Luna (Remix)	Ellen Shipley, Rick Nowels, Alexis Grullón, Noelia Lorenzo	Alexis Grullón	7:27

== Notes ==
- Track listing and credits from album booklet.

== Charts ==
=== Albums ===
Year	Chart	Peak
2002	Billboard Top Latin Albums	36
2002	Billboard Latin Pop Albums	14

=== Singles charts ===
Year	Chart	Song	Peak
2002	Billboard Hot Latin Songs	Te Vine a Buscar	24
2002	Billboard Latin Pop Airplay	Te Vine a Buscar	16
2002	Billboard Latin Tropical/Salsa Airplay	Te Vine a Buscar	19
