= Floreciendo! =

Studio album by Yolandita Monge
- Released: 1975
- Recorded: Buenos Aires, Argentina
- Genre: Latin pop
- Label: Coco Records / Musical Productions / Charly
- Producer: Enrique Méndez

Yolandita Monge chronology
Con Todo Mi Amor..! (1974)	Floreciendo! (1975)	Reflexiones (1976)

Floreciendo! (Blooming!) is the seventh (7th) studio album by Puerto Rican singer Yolandita Monge. It was released in 1975 on LP, 8-Track and Cassette format under her new label Coco Records. This album served as the first stepping stone for her success in the Latin American markets. With this recording contract, Monge joined the ranks of other major performers in Puerto Rico and in the latin market of the United States. The album was her first best selling release and features her first international radio hit, Cierra Los Ojos Y Juntos Recordemos, a song she still performs in her concerts. Another radio hit was Alguien A Quien Se Amó Demás.

The album was re-issued in CD format in 1990 by Musical Productions and re-titled as Cierra Los Ojos Y Juntos Recordemos with a different cover picture. Such 1990 re-issue and the 1975 original release are both available as a digital downloads at iTunes and Amazon, as well as several hits songs also appear in various compilations of the singer available on such media platforms. Coco Records/Charly re-released the album in November 2020 as a digital download, also available at iTunes and Amazon.

== Track listing ==
Track	Title	Composer(s)	Duration
1	"Cierra Los Ojos Y Juntos Recordemos"	Eduardo Franco	3:23
2	"Cuando Estemos Lejos"	A. Villa, S. Villar	2:34
3	"Adios Amor Adios"	O. Ortega, T. Ronald	3:28
4	"Alguien A Quien Se Amó Demás"	Wilkins	3:16
5	"No Soy Lisa"	Jessie Colter, Tite Curet Alonso	3:06
6	"Una Sonrisa, Una Lágrima"	R. Mochoulske, Charlie Leroy	3:05
7	"Un Ser Muy Triste"	B. Orlando, R. Amado, M. Bernos	2:37
8	"Cada Noche Mía"	Eduardo Franco	2:37
9	"La Vida En Un Segundo"	Raúl Parentella, Chico Novarro	3:28
10	"Te Llevo Conmigo"	Wilkins	2:35

== Credits and personnel ==
- Vocals: Yolandita Monge
- Producer: Enrique Méndez
- Arrangements & Recording Director: Raúl Parentella
- Recorded: Buenos Aires, Argentina, September 1975
- Album Design: Visual Communications, NYC
- Art Direction: Izzy Sanabria, Chico Alvarez.

== Notes ==
- Track listing and credits from album cover.
- Re-released in CD Format by Musical Productions on 1990 (MP-3123CD) under license of The Note Records & Tapes, Inc.
- Re-released digitally by Musical Productions on October 25, 2016.
- Re-released digitally by Coco Records/Charly in December 2020.
