= Yolandita (1995 album) =

Yolandita (1995)

Studio album by Yolandita Monge
- Released: 7 November 1995
- Recorded: Miami
- Genre: Latin pop
- Label: WEA-Latina
- Producer: Gustavo Márquez

Yolandita Monge chronology
Fiebre de Luna (1994)	Yolandita (1995) (1995)	Mi Encuentro (1997)

Yolandita is the twenty-first (21st) studio album by Puerto Rican singer Yolandita Monge, released in 1995. It marked the biggest radical change of sound and image for Monge, with a fresh and young approach that included long hair and a belly ring. This time, the singer chose a new producer (Gustavo Márquez) leaving behind her signature strong ballads and vocal delivery.

In the first six months of its release, more than 200,000 copies were sold in several Latin American countries. The album earned Gold status due to high sales and is available as a digital download at iTunes and Amazon with a different artwork.

== Track listing ==
Track	Title	Composer(s)
1	"Tu, Tu, Tu, Tu"	Giancarlo Bigazzi, Paul Holland, Ignacio Ballesteros
2	"Busco Tu Amor" (Cerco Amore)	Leonardo Filippo Garilli, Michele Galasso, Gustavo Márquez
3	"Vete Mi Amor" (Vattene, Mi Amor)	Amedeo Minghi, Ignacio Ballesteros
4	"Noche Rosa" (Notte Rota)	Giancarlo Bigazzi, Umberto Tozzi, Ignacio Ballesteros
5	"Cuando Miro Tu Foto"	Rudy Pérez, Adrián Posse
6	"Antes De Ti"	Gustavo Márquez
7	"Sueños Por Quien" (Figli Di Chi)	Nek, Giuseppe Isgrò, Antonello De Sanctis, Mietta, Gustavo Marquéz
8	"Tu Volverás" (Batticuore)	Massimo Luca, Loredana Bevini, Ignacio Ballesteros
9	"Hay Amor"	Ricardo Montaner
10	"Cuando Nacen Amores"	Adelio Cogliati, Franco Ciani, Ricardo Montaner

== Credits and personnel ==
- Vocals: Yolandita Monge
- Producer: Gustavo Márquez
- Executive Producer: Sergio Rozenblat
- Arrangements: Paul Hoyle, Gustavo Márquez
- Bass, Piano, Keyboards: Paul Hoyle
- String Direction: Paul Hoyle
- Drums: Orlando Hernández
- Guitars: Ramón Stagnaro, Manny López ('Hay Amor')
- Sax: Wayne Gutshall
- Strings: Miami String Symphony
- Violins: John Dipuccio, Joanie Faigen, Bruce Wethey, Gustavo Correa, Mei Mei Luo, Hui Fang Chen, Eddy Martínez
- Violas: David Chapell, Debra Spring
- Cello: Phil Lakosky
- String Coordinator: Alfredo Oliva
- Chorus: George Noriega, Margie Cruz, Gustavo Márquez, Geannie Cruz, Paul Hoyle
- Preproduction Studio: Extreme Music
- Engineers: Lewis Martinee, David Briseño, Femio Hernández
- Assistants: Chris Carol, Ken Schodron, Chris Spahr, Mark Gruver
- Recorded & Mixed: Criteria Studio
- Mastering: Fuller Sound
- Photography: Fernando Báez
- Graphic Design: Graff Group, Miami

== Notes ==
- Track listing and credits from album booklet.
- Released in Cassette Format on 1995 (12692-4).
- Released digitally by WEA-Latina on 18 January 2011 with different artwork.

== Charts ==
=== Singles ===
Year	Chart	Song	Peak
1995	Billboard Latin Tropical/Salsa Airplay	Tu,Tu,Tu,Tu	15
1996	Billboard Latin Pop Airplay	Tu,Tu,Tu,Tu	4
1996	Billboard Hot Latin Songs	Tu,Tu,Tu,Tu	17
1996	Billboard Latin Pop Airplay	Antes de Ti	10
