= Puerto Rico's Poignant... Powerful... Incomparable... =

Studio album by Yolandita Monge
- Released: October 1969
- Recorded: New York City and Puerto Rico
- Genre: Latin pop
- Label: Patty Records / Disco Hit Productions
- Producer: Maximo Torres, Julio Rivero

Yolandita Monge chronology
Puerto Rico's Poignant... Powerful... Incomparable... (1969)	A Star is Shining (1970)

Puerto Rico's Poignant... Powerful... Incomparable... is the first (1st) studio album by Puerto Rican singer Yolandita Monge under the label Patty Records. It was released in 1969, when she was only 14 years old. It includes the radio hits Vida and El Resfriado.

The album was re-released in the early 1990s by the label Disco Hit in cassette format re-titled as "Sus Grandes Exitos". It is currently out of print in all media layouts.

== Track listing ==
Track	Title	Composer(s)	Musical Direction
1	"El Amor"	Tite Curet Alonso	'Gran Orquesta'
2	“Mi Juramento”	Chico Novarro	'Orquesta Julio Rivero'
3	“Vida”	Tite Curet Alonso	'Gran Orquesta'
4	“La Juventud”	Palito Ortega	'Orquesta Julio Rivero'
5	“El Resfriado”	Tite Curet Alonso	'Guitarras'
6	“Todo Aquello”	Tite Curet Alonso	'Orquesta Julio Rivero'
7	“Las Olas”	Tite Curet Alonso	'Orquesta Julio Rivero'
8	“Nada”	Lucho Muñoz	'Orquesta Julio Rivero'
9	“Un Día Será”	Tite Curet Alonso	'Orquesta Julio Rivero'
10	“No Se Con Quien Me Quedaré"	Tite Curet Alonso	'Guitarras'

== Credits and personnel ==
- Vocals: Yolandita Monge
- Musical Arrangements: Máximo Torres, Julio Rivero
- Spanish Translations of Tracks 1, 2, 3, 5, 6, 7, 9 & 10: Tite Curet Alonso

== Notes ==
- Track listing and credits from album cover.
- Re-released in Cassette Format by Disco Hit Productions/Aponte Latin Music Distribution (DHC-1622) re-titled as "Sus Grandes Exitos".
