= Reflexiones (Yolandita Monge album) =

Studio album by Yolandita Monge
- Released: 1976
- Recorded: Buenos Aires, Argentina
- Genre: Latin pop
- Label: Coco Records / Musical Productions / Charly
- Producer: Enrique Méndez

Yolandita Monge chronology
Floreciendo! (1975)	Reflexiones (1976)	Soy Ante Todo Mujer (1977)

Reflexiones is the eighth (8th) studio album by Puerto Rican singer Yolandita Monge. It was released in 1976 on LP, 8-Track and Cassette format and contains the radio hits Páginas Del Alma and Es La Lluvia Que Cayendo Va.

The album is available as a digital download at iTunes and Amazon, as well as several hits songs also appear in various compilations of the singer available on such media platforms. Coco Records/Charly re-released the album in November 2020 as a digital download, also available at iTunes and Amazon. The album also got a physical CD release in June 2022.

== Track listing ==
Track	Title	Composer(s)	Duration
1	"Páginas Del Alma"	Eduardo Franco	3:04
2	"Es La Lluvia Que Cayendo Va"	Wilkins	2:49
3	"Guárdame"	Raul Parentella, Chico Novarro	2:48
4	"Yo Creo Que Es Mejor Decir Adiós"	Wilkins	2:26
5	"El Sueño De Tu Piel"	Raul Parentella, E. Blazquez	2:48
6	"Soy Un Poco De Tí"	Eduardo Franco	3:03
7	"Después Viene El Vacío"	Wilkins	2:13
8	"De Que Me Sirve Todo Esto"	Jairo, A. L. González	2:46
9	"Y Todavía Te Quiero"	Wilkins	2:52
10	"Los Dos Y La Ventana"	C. Alem, C. Cabrera	3:04

== Credits and personnel ==
- Vocals: Yolandita Monge
- Producer: Enrique Méndez
- Arrangements & Recording Director: Raúl Parentella
- Mastering: José Rodríguez
- Recorded: Buenos Aires, Argentina, May 1976
- Art Direction & Design: Hal. Wilson
- Photography: Cándido Ortiz

== Notes ==
- Track listing and credits from album cover.
- Re-released digitally by Musical Productions on October 25, 2016.
- Re-released digitally by Coco Records/Charly in November 2020.
- Re-released on CD by Coco Records in June 2022.
