= Yolandita Monge =

Puerto Rican singer

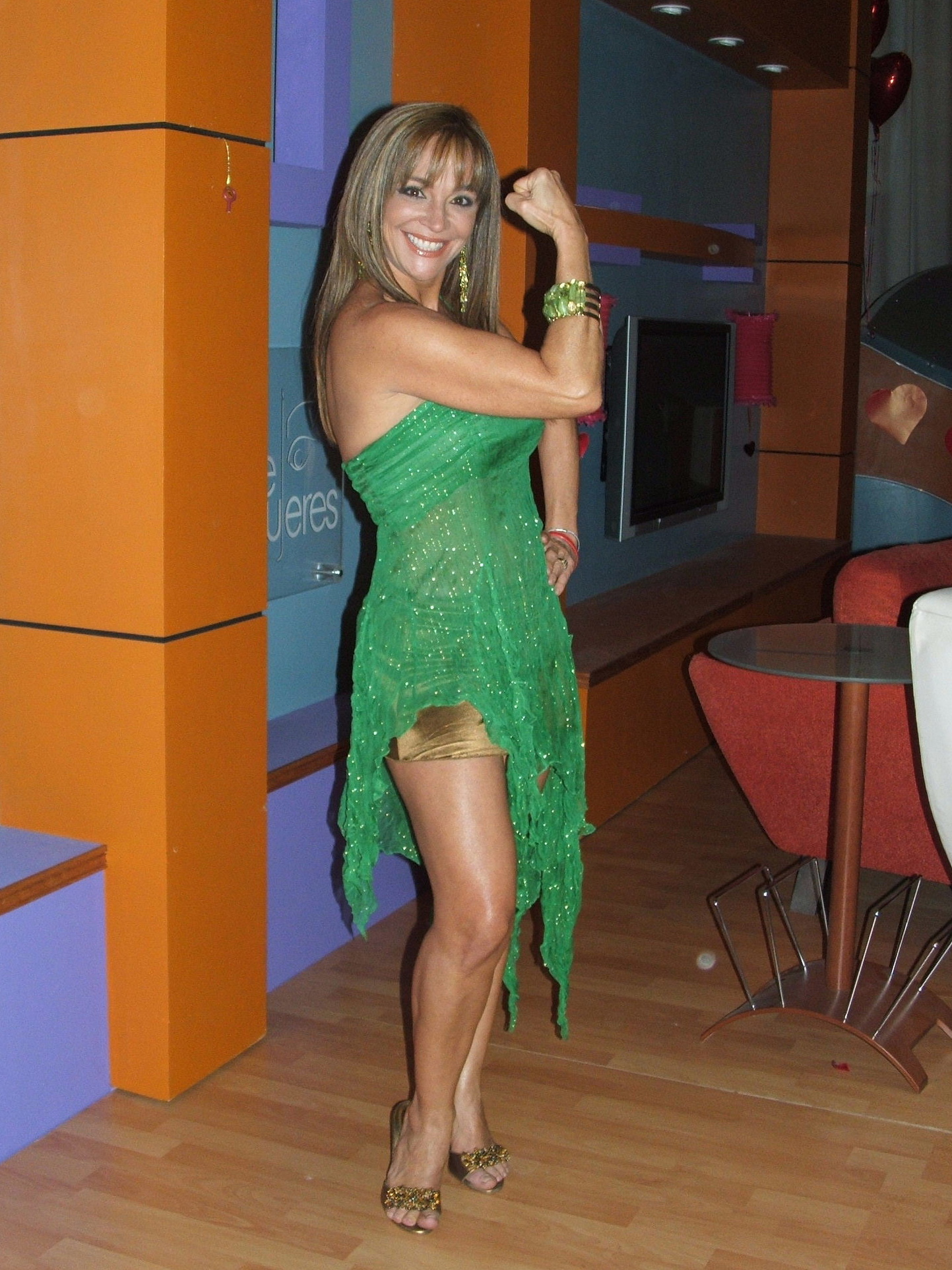
- Yolandita Monge at her TV show De Mujeres
- Born: Yolanda Rosa Monge Betancourt; September 16, 1955 (age 71); Trujillo Alto, Puerto Rico
- Occupations: Singer; actress; television presenter; talk show host
- Years active: 1968–present
- Spouse: Carlos 'Topy' Mamery (m. 1989; died 2014)
- Children: 3, Noelia Paola and Imanol.
- Musical career
- Genre: Latin pop
- Instruments: Vocals; mezzo-soprano
- Labels: YM Music (present); ARDC Music Division (2017–2018); Southhill Production Corp (2015); Musical Productions (1990–2016); Orosound Records (2013); Roma Entertainment (2012); Universal Music Latino (2008); Univision Music (2006–2007); Ole Music (2005); Warner Music Latina (2002); BMG U.S. Latin (1999–2001); WEA-Latina (1992–1998); CBS Records (1980–1991); Discofon Records (1979); Coco Records (1975–1978); Tecca Records (1974); AudioVox Records (1973); Patty Records (1969–1972)
- Website: Yolandita página oficial

Yolanda Rosa Monge Betancourt (born September 16, 1955), known professionally as Yolandita Monge, is a Puerto Rican singer, actress, and television personality. She has been active in the music business since her teen years and has recorded 27 studio albums and two live albums, as well as several greatest hits compilations and special appearance recordings.

== Biography ==
=== Early life and family ===
Monge was born in Trujillo Alto, Puerto Rico on September 16, 1955, is the daughter of Iris Delia Betancourt and Héctor Monge. She lived the first seven years of her life in New York City and then came back to Puerto Rico. During the early 70s, she met Alfredo Lorenzo, in New York, and married him on November 13, 1975. They had a daughter, Noelia, but the marriage ended soon afterwards. In 1983, she married Venezuelan singer Balbino, whom she met in Buga, Colombia, and is the father of second daughter Paola González. A few years later, the couple filed for divorce. On December 31, 1989, Yolandita married her manager Carlos "Topy" Mamery and in 1991 gave birth to her only son Imanol Mamery.

=== Early career ===
Blessed with a powerful and versatile vocal range and timbre, Monge started out her career by winning a singing radio contest in 1966 (at the age of eleven).

Yolandita was discovered by the producer Julio Alers, and later on, made her TV debut on Luis Vigoreaux's show, Luis Vigoreaux Presenta. She had a regular section in that show. In 1968, she signed with record label Patty Records, which released her first album, named Puerto Rico's Poignant... Powerful... Incomparable....

It was "El Estornudo" ("The Sneeze"), and her cover of Italian hit "Vida"' ("Life"), that made her a national star after she released her first album. At that young age, Yolandita would perform with legendary Argentinian singer Libertad Lamarque and then sing at the Festival De La Canción Nueva York (New York Song Festival). Soon, she found another job on TV, this time on Tommy Muñiz's show, El Show Del Mediodía.

She followed up with some other hits in Puerto Rico, but then she moved to Mexico, where she signed with Teca Records and had hits such as "Vete de Aqui" ("Get Out of Here"), "Dos Caminos Diferentes" ("Two Different Ways"), "¿Por qué, Papá?" ("Why, Dad?") and "La Voz Del Silencio" ("The Voice of Silence").

=== International breakthrough ===
1975 was a big year for Monge because she released a song named "Cierra Los Ojos" ("Close Your Eyes"), which was a hit in such South American countries as Colombia, Chile, Ecuador, Venezuela, Peru, and Argentina, and also in the Dominican Republic. Yolandita was now an international star.

Soon after, she would be signed by Coco Records of New York, and her career kept going on a steady rise internationally. She sang at the Carnegie Hall and was backed up by her artistic godmother, legendary Argentinian singer and actress, Libertad Lamarque.

=== International success: 1980s ===
In 1980, international label CBS Records International, (now Sony Discos), signed her up into their line-up. Tanto Amor (So much love) composed by Lou Briel, was the first hit song of that album named Fantasia produced by Pepe Luis Soto. She then released another album Historia de Amour which included many top hits. In 1983, she won the Buga Festival, in Buga, Colombia with a song that she wrote her self called Sí (Yes). Her next release in 1983, Sueños, continued her ascent as one of the most important and best selling female singers in Puerto Rico. This album marked a radical change in sound and image for Monge, moving towards the Latin pop tendencies of the time while keeping her interpretative delivery.

Monge continued her winning stride in the middle 1980s, when she released what possibly is one of her greatest album ever: Luz de Luna (Moonlight). This album included her classics "Te Veo Pasar" (I See You Walk By), "Señor Del Pasado" (Man from the Past), and "El Poder del Amor", which was a cover of the popular song "The Power of Love" (most recently recorded by Céline Dion). With this album, she became the first Puerto Rican female singer to earn a gold record.

She followed up that album with the equally successful Laberinto de Amor (Labyrinth of Love), which earned her another gold album and later went platinum. The album was nominated for a Grammy Award, years before the Latin Grammy was created. In this album, she sang a Spanish version of "On My Own" ("Solo Yo") which is a song from the soundtrack of the famous Broadway musical Les Misérables. Yolandita was a household name. This album earned her a Grammy nomination in the Best Latin Pop artist category. With this nomination she became the first Puerto Rican female singer to be nominated to the Grammy Music Awards, joined by fellow Puerto Rican singer Lunna, as well in the same category. The album also went gold in many countries including the United States.

In 1988, she achieved multi platinum level sales with her album, Vivencias. Yolandita considers this album the best and most important album of her career. This release included such songs as: "Acariciame" ("Caress Me") and "Este Amor Que Hay Que Callar" ("This Love That We Must Keep Quiet") composed for her by the Spanish singer and author Braulio. She became the first Puerto Rican singer to win a gold album record, a platinum record and a double platinum.

Yolandita was claimed by the America's music magazine Billboard in 1988 as "The best-selling Latin artist of the year" due to being the first Puerto Rican female artist to sell millions of records. She also was claimed by the international music press as "The most important Latin singer of the decade" (1980–1990). NBC traveled all the way to Puerto Rico to interview Yolandita because they consider her the most relevant artist of the Latin music industry and she was even compared with Madonna. In the interview the reporter said: "Yolandita has no plans to make the crossover, so Madonna can relax."

=== Yolandita in the 1990s ===
After the huge success of Vivencias, she changed gears in terms of music style and released Portfolio in the summer of 1990, with the help of Venezuelan singer Ricardo Montaner which was one of the producers and songwriters. With Portfolio, she performed nine sold-out concerts at Puerto Rico's Centro de Bellas Artes (making a new record on sales), and at the Madison Square Garden. During her performances at the Centro de Bellas Artes, Yolandita became the first Latin performer, and one of the earliest recording artists, to use a wireless headset microphone, allowing her to dance while she sang.

After more than ten years at Sony Latin, Yolandita signed a multimillion-dollar recording contract with WEA-Latina, the first for a female pop artist in Puerto Rico. The first release was Cara de Ángel, the follow-up to Portfolio. It contains the radio hits "Sobreviviré", "Viviré Sin Tí", and "Entrega Total". In May 1992, for the "Cara de Angel Tour", Yolandita established a new record at the Performing Arts Center of Puerto Rico (Centro de Bellas Artes), becoming the biggest singer selling out all the concerts, without courtesy tickets, up to 12 concerts of the same tour, breaking her own record. Also in 1992, Yolandita was invited by Spanish Tenor, Plácido Domingo, to be part of a Special Tribute to the artist Goya, the tribute was a special-release album. Yolandita also released her first Christmas album in 1992 titled Mi Mejor Regalo.

In 1994, she became the first Puerto Rican female to land a commercial deal with Pepe Jeans London and also for Diet Pepsi. During that year, Monge released Fiebre de Luna, along with a change of image. The hit album included compositions from Las Diego and produced the hit singles "A Pesar del Tiempo" and "Como Puedes". She teamed with singer Ricardo Montaner to do a concert and they earned a Guinness World Records as becoming the first singers to perform 3 concerts in 3 different cities (Mayagüez, Ponce and San Juan) – all in the same day. This could be done, using air transportation by helicopter. It was called: El Suceso (The Event).

In 1995, Yolandita released the self-titled Yolandita, along with another change in image with long hair and a belly ring. Right after, Monge relocated to Colombia to act in telenovela alongside Puerto Rican actor Osvaldo Ríos. Yolandita was honored in 1996 by the Puerto Rican Senate for her long career as a singer and actress. She also earned two of the most prestigious awards of the Latin music industry, Premios Lo Nuestro and Premios Tu Música. Also in 1996, she participated in the annual music video special, produced by Banco Popular de Puerto Rico, dedicated to Pedro Flores, which usually includes only the most important and international singers the island has to offer.

In 1997, Yolandita released Mi Encuentro, which included bomba and plena, a Puerto Rican rhythm. The album was a hit and cemented the singer's ability to tacke any kind of music. The singer returned with another change of image and to her signature strong ballads with the album Siento in early 1999. The album was certified gold and included the hits "Dime", "Arriesgaré la Piel" and "Mala Sangre".

=== 2000–present ===
In late 2000, Yolandita released her second live album Yolandita En Vivo recorded at Centro de Bellas Artes of Puerto Rico. It included many of her early hits and the duet "Sobrevivire" with her second daughter Paola González.

Yolandita took some time off and returned with Sexto Sentido in 2002, which included a collaboration with her eldest daughter and singer Noelia. This album was produced by Colombian producer Kike Santander and was certified gold. After that, the singer took a lengthy hiatus from recording to pursue other acting opportunities.

In 2004 she conducted her TV show for Telemundo called De Mujeres (Of Women). In this variety show she performed comedy skits and interviewed both local and international stars. She also sang with Julieta Venegas, Luis Fonsi, Lucecita Benítez, Víctor Manuelle, Chucho Avellanet, Gilberto Santa Rosa, La India, Gisselle, Lissette, Tito Nieves, Dagmar, Andy Montañez, Danny Rivera, and many more. These performances were once-in-a-lifetime duets that graced Puerto Rico's silver screen and kept the captive audience that followed the show wanting more.

After five years of not releasing a new album, Monge released on June 5, 2007, her album Demasiado Fuerte. It debuted number one in Billboard Latin Pop Albums making her return to music one of the greatest comebacks ever seen in the Latin Market. The album was produced by José Luis Pagán and Jorge Luis Piloto. Also, the album included the hits "Y Todavia" and the title track, "Demasiado Fuerte", both of which were remixed in reggaeton style and became hits in the urban radio stations in Puerto Rico and the Latin communities in United States. In November 2007, Yolandita returned to Centro de Bellas Artes with five sold-out concerts in support of the Demasiado Fuerte album. The singer received the best reviews of her career with those performances, which included duets with guest Glenn Monroig.

On October 6, 2008, Monge debuted the single "Mala". Immediately, on November 22, 2008, Yolandita released the album Mala, produced once again by José Luis Pagán and following the same musical and lyrical style as her previous Demasiado Fuerte. This album contains the song "Oportunidad Perdida" featuring Víctor Manuelle, which was re-recorded with Anthony Ríos in bachata style. Also, the song "Mala" was remixed in reggaeton style featuring Ivy Queen and in salsa style featuring La India. The song "Una y Otra Vez" was remixed in reggaeton style featuring Divino.

After the success of those radio remixes, Yolandita recorded a remix single with reggaeton artist Tito el Bambino called "El Amor", which used her same-titled smash hit from the 80s to his version. The song made it to the No. 1 spot in the Hot Latin Songs Billboard Chart.

On September 11, 2010, Yolandita debuted at Coliseo de Puerto Rico in the concert 20 Años de Vivencias, celebrating the twenty year anniversary of the release of her iconic album Vivencias. She performed the vast majority of her hits of the 70's, 80's, and 90's, as well as her current repertoire. Soon after, Yolandita returned to Centro de Bellas Artes in April 2011, for a once-in-a-lifetime sold-out concert accompanied by the Philharmonic Orchestra of Puerto Rico, as part of the thirty year anniversary celebration of the venue. All the songs were deconstructed and performed acoustically.

During 2012, Yolandita was one of three judges in Idol Puerto Rico, along with her husband Carlos 'Topy' Mamery and Ricardo Montaner during the second season of the program.

On November 13, 2012, Yolandita released her new album Más Para Dar, with lyrics written by herself and José Luis Pagán. The album was produced by José Luis Pagán and it follows the same musical and lyrical style as her previous records. Yolandita returned to Coliseo de Puerto Rico for the "Más Para Dar Tour" on March 16, 2013. Beginning in the Dominican Republic, this concert tour visited cities in the United States, Puerto Rico and Latin America. In the concerts at Santo Domingo, Yolandita shared the stage with Danny Rivera.

On December 3, 2014, her husband and manager of more than twenty years, Carlos 'Topy' Mamery, died of a massive heart attack. The funeral was held on December 5, 2014, alongside hundreds of fans, friends and family members. After that tragedy, Yolandita retired from public view for the following months of 2015.

On September 20, 2015, Yolandita returned to the concert stage after nine months of mourning at Coliseo de Puerto Rico for "Latidos de mi Corazón", a tribute to her late husband Carlos 'Topy' Mamery. She performed some of her hits and her new digital single Sin Tí, a song written by Las Diego, as well as other love songs from other artists. Her children, Imanol and Paola, joined her on stage for two songs, as well as some relatives of the Mamery and Monge families for the encore. On May 28, 2016, she presented the concert "Latidos de mi Corazón" at the Lehman Center for the Performing Arts in New York for her many fans there.

Yolandita recorded a jazz version of the Latin American standard Cuando Vuelva A Tu Lado for Humberto Ramírez's new album Bohemia Jazz, released on January 27, 2016. The album contains other songs performed by Nydia Caro, Chucho Avellanet, Dagmar, Michelle Brava, Andy Montañez and Carola Ausbury. The singer was one of many artists that performed at the Fiestas de la Calle San Sebastián in San Juan, Puerto Rico in 2016, 2017 & 2018.

On May 13, 14 & 27, 2017, Yolandita teamed for the first time with Lissette Alvarez for a three sold-out performances at Centro de Bellas Artes of Caguas for the concert "Emociones". She sang her most beloved hits along with duets with Lissette Alvarez. The singers performed together the hits "Hoy Vine Con Ella", "Cantaré", "El Amor" and "Gracias a la Vida", as well as sharing a medley of both their greatest hits.

Yolandita returned to Centro de Bellas Artes for five sold-out performances of the new show "Por Tí" on December 6, 7 & 8, 2019 and February 14 & 15, 2020. Monge performed all her greatest hits including a new version of the 1989 club hit Por Ti and several other songs in an a cappella sing-along with the audience.

The singer remains active throughout the year performing live in concerts and festivals in Puerto Rico and other Latin American countries.

== Yolandita, the actress ==
Monge has had a very distinguished acting career, she's acted in more than ten Spanish soap operas, as well as various theatre plays and TV shows. Among the telenovelas, she acted in: Vida (Life), (where she performed with Johanna Rosaly), La Mentira (The Lie), Poquita Cosa (Small Thing), Escándalo (Scandal) (where she acted alongside Andrés García, Iris Chacón and Charytín), and Ave de Paso (Bird of Passage), where she played the main role, and sang the theme song: "Nunca Te Diré Adiós", composed for her by Lou Briel. This song was a big hit in 1989, and it was included in a Special Edition Album: Yolandita Monge Live from New York. She also acted in the original version of the Colombian mega-hit soap opera, La Viuda de Blanco along with Osvaldo Ríos, Maria Helena Doehring, Jorge Enrique Abello and Danilo Santos. From 1996 to 1997, this soap opera was translated in more than 32 languages. Her theatrical debut was in La Visita de la Bestia, which is a Spanish version of Extremities, and she got good reviews from the press by playing the very dramatic main role. She also earned international recognition playing the Greek-soprano, Maria Callas, in the Spanish version of the Tony Award winner play Master Class (Clase Maestra) in 2003, for the Latin community in the United States and Latin America. Yolandita made all the critics bow when they saw her rendition of the late-diva. A year later she landed the lead female role in the musical La Verdadera Historia de Pedro Navaja (The True Story of Pedro Navaja), opposite Gilberto Santa Rosa. For her performance as Diana la Maromera (Diana the Juggler), in this musical, she got good reviews. In 1999, Monge headlined the TV movie Ocho años de Dolor (Eight Years of Pain), where she played a woman kidnapped by the famous Puerto Rican serial killer and fugitive of the law Toño Bicicleta. Yolandita's most recent acting role was in the Puerto Rican movie Mujeres sin Hombres (Women without Men), in 2006. She joined Sully Diaz and Claribel Medina in this story about 3 women and the revenge of men. After that in 2010, Yolandita starred in the first episode of the Telemundo TV Series called Extremos. In it she played the roles of twin sister. The reviews of Yolandita's acting role were good in this dramatic role. The critics indicated that "...When it comes to acting, Yolandita can be intense and excellent as she is as a singer...". Most recently, in 2017 she joined the cast of Malas and in 2018 she performed alongside other actresses in The Vagina Monologues.

== Awards and recognitions ==
Here is a partial list of Yolandita's awards, honors and recognitions over the years.

- 1983: Buga Song Festival – Won for the song Si.
- 1985: The first Puerto Rican female singer to earn a Gold record.
- 1987: Nomination. Grammy Award for Best Latin Pop Album for Laberinto de Amor.
- 1988: The best-selling Latin artist of the year, according to Billboard Magazine.
- 1989: Nomination for Premio Lo Nuestro Best Female Ballad/Pop Singer
- 1989: Paoli Award for Best Video of The Year for the video clip Por ti.
- 1989: The first Puerto Rican female singer to earn a Platinum record.
- 1992: The first artist selling out all the concerts, up to 12 concerts of the same tour.
- 1993: ACE Awards – Special Award.
- 1995: Guinness World Record – The first singer to perform 3 concerts in 3 different cities in the same day.
- 1996: The Puerto Rican Senate Special Honor for her long career as a singer and actress.
- 1997: Tu Musica Award – Projection in abroad.
- 1997: Quijote Award for Best Musical Transmission (Cita con las Reinas).
- 2000: Cassandra International Award.
- 2001: A Star in the Boulevard of Stars in Santo Domingo.
- 2002: Tu Musica Awards – Best Ballad Record by a female singer (Sexto Sentido).
- 2003: An Award for her Trajectory as an Actress from The PR Government Florida District.
- 2003 Dance Show of the Year: Yolandita Monge Sexto Sentido Concert.
- 2006 Our pride Award – Institute of New York City.
- 2007 Puerto Rican Pride Honor – 21st anniversary of Comité Puertorriqueño – a Puerto Rican heritage organization
- 2008 Nomination. Spanish GLAAD Media Awards for Outstanding Music Artist.
- 2008 Nomination. Billboard Latin Music Awards for Best Latin Pop Female Album for Demasiado Fuerte.
- 2008 Finalist. Special Tu Mundo Award in Billboard Latin Music Awards

== Selected discography ==
Year	Album title	Record label	Notes	Certifications
1969	Puerto Rico's Poignant... Powerful... Incomparable...	Patty Records		
1970	A star is Shining	Patty Records		
1971	La Personalidad de Yolandita Monge	Patty Records		
1971	Recuérdame	Teca Records		
1972	Parece Fantasía	Teca Records		
1973	Yo Soy	Audiovox Records		
1974	Con Todo Mi Amor..!			
1975	Floreciendo!	Coco Records		Gold
1976	Reflexiones			
1977	Soy Ante Todo Mujer			
1978	En Su Intimidad			
1979	Estilo y Personalidad	Discofon	Compilation album	
1980	Fantasia	CBS Records		
1981	Historia de Amour	CBS Records		
1983	Sueños	CBS Records		
1985	Luz de Luna	CBS Records		Gold
1986	Mis Canciones Preferidas	CBS Records	Compilation album	
1987	Laberinto de Amor	CBS Records		Gold
1988	Nunca Te Diré Adiós / En Concierto	CBS Records	Live album	
1988	Vivencias	CBS Records		Gold, Platinum, Double Platinum
1990	Portfolio	CBS Records		Gold
1991	Limited Edition	CBS Records	Remix album	
1991	Mis Canciones Preferidas 2	CBS Records	Compilation album	
1992	Cara de Ángel	WEA-Latina		Gold, Platinum, Double Platinum
1992	Mi Mejor Regalo	WEA-Latina	Christmas album	
1994	Fiebre de Luna	WEA-Latina		Gold
1995	Yolandita (1995)	WEA-Latina		Gold
1997	Mi Encuentro	WEA-Latina		Gold
1999	Siento	BMG U.S. Latin		
2000	Yolandita En Vivo	BMG U.S. Latin	Live album	
2000	Yolandita (2000)	Z Records	Compilation album	
2002	Sexto Sentido	Warner Music Latina		
2007	Demasiado Fuerte	Univision Music		Gold
2008	Mala	Universal Music Latino		
2012	Más Para Dar	Roma Entertainment		

== See also ==
- List of Puerto Ricans
- List of Puerto Rican songwriters
- Music of Puerto Rico
