= Silent Voices (Dionne Warwick song) =

Song by Dionne Warwick

from the album Dionne Warwick in Valley of the Dolls
- Released: 23 March 1968
- Genre: Pop; soul
- Length: 3:09
- Label: Scepter
- Composer(s): Elio Isola
- Lyricist(s): Norman Monath
- Producer(s): Burt Bacharach; Hal David

"Silent Voices" is a song recorded by American singer Dionne Warwick in 1968. It is a reworked English-language version of the Italian song "La voce del silenzio" ("The Voice of Silence"), written by Paolo Limiti, Mogol and Elio Isola, presented at the Sanremo Music Festival 1968 in the interpretation of Tony Del Monaco and the same Warwick. American author Norman Monath wrote the English lyrics, which bear no relation to the original Italian.

The Italian single versions had "Una piccola candela" (Tony Del Monaco) and "Unchained Melody" (Dionne Warwick) both as B-sides, while the English version was a song from the album Dionne Warwick in Valley of the Dolls (23 March 1968).
