= Portfolio (Yolandita Monge album) =

Studio album by Yolandita Monge
- Released: August 9, 1990
- Recorded: Miami
- Genre: Latin pop
- Label: CBS Records
- Producer: Pablo Manavello

Yolandita Monge chronology
Vivencias (1988)	Portfolio (1990)	Limited Edition (1991)

Portfolio is the seventeenth (17th) studio album by Puerto Rican singer Yolandita Monge. It was released in 1990 and it was the final studio album under her CBS Records contract. This release includes the hits "Cantaré", "Sin Amor", and the club hit "Fuiste Un Sueño". Seven out of ten tracks in this album were composed by Venezuelan singer/songwriter Ricardo Montaner. The breathtaking album's cover picture was taken by late photographer and stylist Raúl Torres and is a black and white picture, hand painted.

The song "Fuiste Un Sueño" was remixed by DJs Pablo Flores and Javier Garza and also became a massive club hit in Puerto Rico and USA. The singer filmed a music video for that song (directed by her brother in law Eric Mamery) and it won many awards for its technical and artistic values. The track "Cantaré" became an anthem due to the AIDS epidemic and the Persian Gulf War.

Just when everyone thought that after the success of Vivencias, Yolandita Monge would return with a similar production (an album of strong ballads), the singer surprised everyone with a light, fresh and very musical offering. "Portfolio" is one of her richest work in musical terms and as far as arrangements are concerned. In "Portfolio" Yolandita seemed reborn, as suggested by its beautiful cover picture.

This album earned Gold status and is out of print in all formats. Several hits songs appear in various compilations of the singer available as digital downloads at iTunes and Amazon.

== Track listing ==
Track	Title	Composer(s)	Arrangements
1	"Cantaré"	Adelio Gogliati, Danilo Ventura, Romano Musumarra, Ricardo Montaner, Pablo Manavello	Iker Gastaminza, Pablo Manavello
2	"Laberinto Sin Salida"	Ricardo Montaner, Pablo Manavello	Iker Gastaminza, Pablo Manavello
3	"Fuiste Un Sueño"	Pablo Manavello	Iker Gastaminza, Pablo Manavello
4	"Contra La Pared"	Ricardo Montaner, Pablo Manavello	Iker Gastaminza, Pablo Manavello
5	"Ahora No"	Fabrizio Berlincioni, Fausto Leali, Franco Fasano, Italo Ianne, Ricardo Montaner, Pablo Manavello	José T. Martín
6	"Sin Amor"	Ricardo Montaner, Pablo Manavello	Iker Gastaminza, Pablo Manavello
7	"No Me Acostumbro"	Pablo Manavello	Iker Gastaminza, Pablo Manavello
8	"Esta Guerra La Perderé"	Ricardo Montaner, Pablo Manavello	Iker Gastaminza, Pablo Manavello
9	"Como Duele La Noche"	Félix Madrigal, Ramón Valery	Iker Gastaminza, Pablo Manavello
10	"Despierto Soñándote"	Ricardo Montaner, Pablo Manavello	Iker Gastaminza, Pablo Manavello

== Credits and personnel ==
- Vocals: Yolandita Monge
- Producer: Pablo Manavello
- Programming & Keyboards: Iker Gastaminza
- Piano Montuno: Joel Uriola
- Percussion: Carlos 'Nene' Quintero
- Drums: Ricardo Delgado
- Guitars: Pablo Manavello
- Brass: Gustavo Arangurén, Rafael Araujo, Ramón Carranza, Jacinto Parra, Héctor Velázquez, Geomar Hernández
- Sax: Ed Calle
- Chorus: Sofía 'Nena' Pulido, Francis Benítez, Beatriz Corona, Edgar Salazar, Oscar Galian, Zenko Matousck
- Engineer: Víctor Di Persia
- Mixing: Gaetano Bellomo
- Assistants: Jim Thomas, Gary Bosko, Riley J. Cornell
- Hair: Fernando Báez
- Make-up: Raúl Torres
- Photography and Art Design: Raúl Torres

== Notes ==
- Track listing and credits from album booklet.
- Released in Cassette Format on 1990 (DIC-80391).
- Released in CD Format on 1990 (CD-80391).

== Charts ==
=== Album ===
Chart (1990)	Peak position
US Latin Pop Albums (Billboard)	12

=== Singles ===
Year	Song	Chart	Peak
1990	"Sin Amor"	US Hot Latin Songs (Billboard)	14
1991	"Fuiste Un Sueño"	US Hot Latin Songs (Billboard)	23
1991	"Cantaré"	US Hot Latin Songs (Billboard)	27
1991	"No me Acostumbro"	US Hot Latin Songs (Billboard)	36
