= Vivencias (Yolandita Monge album) =

Studio album by Yolandita Monge
- Released: 1988
- Recorded: Miami
- Genre: Latin pop
- Label: CBS Records / Orosound Records
- Producers: Rudy Pérez, Ricardo Eddy Martínez

Yolandita Monge chronology
Nunca Te Diré Adiós / En Concierto (1988)	Vivencias (1988)	Portfolio (1990)

Vivencias (Experiences) is the sixteenth (16th) studio album by Puerto Rican singer Yolandita Monge. It was released in 1988 and includes the massive hits "Este Amor Que Hay que Callar", "Borinqueña”, “Débil", "Quítame A Ese Hombre Del Corazón", "Por Tí (Call Me)", "Acaríciame", and "Cuando Termina Un Amor". Nearly all the tracks in this album were huge radio hits that the singer still performs in her live shows. This album earned the first Platinum status for a female Puerto Rican singer. Since then, it has earned double Platinum and double Gold status. The album's cover picture was taken by late photographer and stylist Raúl Torres.

The track "Este Amor Que Hay Que Callar", composed by Canarian singer-songwriter Braulio, caused considerable controversy in Puerto Rico due to its theme of adultery. At the time, some conservative radio stations refused to play the song deeming the lyrics too explicit.

The dance song "Por Tí (Call Me)" was remixed by DJ Pablo Flores and became a club anthem in Puerto Rico and USA. Those remixes were released in a best selling Maxi-Single, a first for a female singer of Puerto Rico and Latin America.

Due to the massive sales and constant radio play of this album, Monge also recorded a music video of all the tracks of this release also titled Vivencias, which was available in VHS and is now sold-out and out of print. Three of the songs from this 1989 special music video ("Este Amor Que Hay Que Callar", "Débil", and "Quítame A Ese Hombre Del Corazón") were re-released in 2007 in DVD format in the Demasiado Fuerte album of 2007.

It is the most successful album of Monge's career and recognized as the one where the singer reached her peak in terms of popularity in Puerto Rico and Latin American markets. This release is her only studio album from her CBS Records years that is exclusively available as a digital download at Amazon.

== Track listing ==
Track	Title	Composer(s)	Notes	Length
01	"Débil"	Rudy Pérez, Omar Sánchez		04:27
02	"Quítame A Ese Hombre Del Corazón"	Jorge Luis Piloto		04:21
03	"Borinqueña"	Rudy Pérez	Cuatro solo by Ito Serrano	04:04
04	"Tiempo Perdido"	Jeannie Cruz		03:08
05	"Este Amor Que Hay Que Callar"	Braulio A. García		04:45
06	"Cuando Termina Un Amor"	Riccardo Cocciante		04:26
07	"Todo A Pulmón"	Alejandro Lerner		03:52
08	"Por Tí" (Call Me)	Giorgio Spagna, Alfredo Larry Pignagnoli, Ivana Spagna, Rudy Pérez	Spanish version of Call Me	03:34
09	"Acaríciame" (Sei Bellissima)	Claudio Daiano, Gian Pietro Felisatti, Lou Briel	Spanish version of Sei bellissima	04:19
10	"El Reto"	Rudy Pérez, Mario Patiño		04:19

== Credits and personnel ==
- Vocals: Yolandita Monge
- Producers: Rudy Pérez, Ricardo Eddy Martínez
- Executive Producer: Angel Carrasco
- Arrangements & Musical Direction: Rudy Pérez, Ricardo Eddy Martínez
- Programming & Keyboards: Ricardo Eddy Martínez
- Bass: Julio Hernández, Ricardo Eddy Martínez
- Guitars: Rudy Pérez, Brian Monrroney
- Percussion: Rudy Pérez
- Strings: Alexander Prilutchi, Jorge Orbón, Bogdan Chruszez, Gerry Miller, Bob Bazzo, Ignacio Berroa, Alfredo Oliva, Bogumila Zgraja, José Montoto, Iris Vaneck, Carol Friedman, Phil Lakofsky
- Brass: Tony Concepción, Kenny Faulk, Dana Teboe
- Chorus: Geannie Cruz, Rudy Pérez
- Engineer: Rudy Pérez, Víctor Di Persia
- Mixing: Rudy Pérez, Ricardo Eddy Martínez
- Recorded: Coral Gables, Florida, May–July 1988
- Photography, Art Design and Concept: Raúl Torres (Prinx Artworx)
- Hair & Make-up: Raúl Torres

== See also ==
- List of Billboard Latin Pop Albums number ones from the 1980s

== Notes ==
- Track listing and credits from album cover.
- Released in Cassette Format on 1988 (DIC-10552).
- Released in CD Format on 1988 (CDDI-10552).
- Re-released digitally by Orosound Records on October 31, 2013.

== Charts ==
=== Album ===
Chart (1988)	Peak position
US Latin Pop Albums (Billboard)	1

=== Singles ===
Year	Song	Chart	Peak
1988	"Este amor que Hay que Callar"	US Hot Latin Songs (Billboard)	3
1989	"Borinqueña"	US Hot Latin Songs (Billboard)	4
1989	"Débil"	US Hot Latin Songs (Billboard)	18
1989	"Quítame ese Hombre del Corazón"	US Hot Latin Songs (Billboard)	12
1989	"Por Ti"	US Hot Latin Songs (Billboard)	6
1989	"Acaríciame"	US Hot Latin Songs (Billboard)	37
1989	"Este Amor que Hay que Callar"	US Hot Latin Tracks Year-end Chart (Billboard)	40
