= Mi Mejor Regalo (Yolandita Monge album) =

Studio album by Yolandita Monge
- Released: November 17, 1992
- Recorded: San Juan
- Genre: Christmas
- Label: WEA-Latina
- Producer: Carlos 'Topy' Mamery

Yolandita Monge chronology
Cara de Ángel (1992)	Mi Mejor Regalo (1992)	Fiebre de Luna (1994)

Mi Mejor Regalo (My Best Gift) is the nineteenth (19th) studio album by Puerto Rican singer Yolandita Monge and also her first Christmas album released in 1992. The compositions and arrangements are more in the style of villancico. The album's cover by photographer and stylist Raúl Torres and is a black and white picture, later color painted.

== Track listing ==
Track	Title	Composer(s)
1	"Regalo De Navidad"	Jorge Luis Piloto
2	"En Un Burrito Orejón"	Cátulo Castillo, Víctor Schlichter
3	"Marinero"	José Luis Perales
4	"Los Reyes No Llegaron"	Esteban Taronjí
5	"Triste Navidad"	Rafael Hernández
6	"El Buen Yaucano"	Amaury Veray
7	"Todo Lo Que Tengo"	George Lamond, Jorge Luis Piloto
8	"La Peregrinación"	Ariel Ramírez, Félix Luna
9	"Esta Navidad"	Willie Chirino

== Credits and personnel ==
- Vocals: Yolandita Monge
- Production: Carlos 'Topy' Mamery
- Musical Arrangements: Julián Navarro
- Mixing: Jan Lucas and Luis G. Pisterman
- Vocal Engineer: Víctor (Sonny) Hernández
- Vocals recorded on Ochoa Recording Studios, Puerto Rico
- Photography and Art Concept: Raúl Torres
- Color Lab: Creative & Graphic Processes
- Graphic Design: Edwin Crespo
- Three Kings Postcard: José R. Colón
- Hair & Make-up: Raúl Torres

== Notes ==
- Track listing and credits from album booklet.
- Released in Cassette Format on 1992 (91254-4).
- Released digitally by WEA-Latina on November 16, 2010.
