= Laberinto de Amor =

Studio album by Yolandita Monge
- Released: 1987
- Recorded: Madrid, Spain
- Genre: Latin pop
- Label: CBS Records
- Producer: Mariano Pérez Bautista

Yolandita Monge chronology
Mis Canciones Preferidas (1986)	Laberinto de Amor (1987)	Nunca Te Diré Adiós / En Concierto (1988)

Laberinto de Amor (Labyrinth of Love) is the fifteenth (15th) studio album by Puerto Rican singer Yolandita Monge. It was released in 1987 and it includes the hits "Laberinto", "Eres Mágico", "Ahora, Ahora", and "Contigo". This album received a nomination for a Grammy Award for Best Latin Pop Album, marking the first time a female artist from Puerto Rico earned a Grammy nomination, a recognition she shares with fellow female artist Lunna for that same year.

This album follows the same musical arrangements and compositions of her previous productions, being her third and last release produced by the spanish team of Mariano Pérez & Oscar Gómez (CRAB). Monge co-translated to the Spanish the Italian song "Ahora, Ahora" and performed a Spanish version of the standard "On My Own" from the Broadway musical Les Miserables. This release was a big hit for Monge while earning Gold and Platinum status in sales.

This album is out of print in all formats. Several hits songs appear in various compilations of the singer available as digital downloads at iTunes and Amazon.

== Track listing ==
Track	Title	Composer(s)	Arrangements
1	"Laberinto de amor"	Mariano Pérez, Carlos Gómez, María R. Ovelar	Carlos Gómez
2	"Amándote"	Mariano Pérez, Carlos Gómez, Rosa Girón, J. A. G. Morato	Carlos Gómez
3	"Todas Las Noches Quiero"	E. Lozano, A. R. Linares, J. R. Linares	Javier Lozada
4	"Solo Yo" (Spanish version of On My Own (Les Miserables))	H. Kretmer, C. M. Schonberg, Oscar Gómez	Javier Lozada
5	"Contigo"	Las Diego (Maria Luisa & Teresita Diego)	Carlos Gómez
6	"Siempre Juntos"	Mariano Pérez, Carlos Gómez	Carlos Gómez
7	"Te Agradezco"	Carlos Colla, Mauricio Duboc, L. A. Ferri	Carlos Gómez
8	"Eres Mágico"	Alice May, Rosa Girón, J. A. G. Morato	Carlos Gómez
9	"A Punto"	Mariano Pérez, Rosa Girón, J. A. G. Morato	Javier Lozada
10	"Ahora, Ahora"	Cristiano Malgioglio, Gian Pietro Felisatti, María R. Ovelar, Yolandita Monge	Javier Lozada

== Credits and personnel ==
- Vocals: Yolandita Monge
- Producer: Mariano Pérez Bautista
- Executive Producer: Sergio Rozenblat
- Arrangements: Carlos Gómez, Javier Lozada
- Drums: Mariano Rico, Antonio Moreno
- Bass: Eduardo Gracia, Manolo Toro
- Guitar: Pepe Marchante
- Acoustic Guitar: Miguel Inesta
- Pianos: Carlos Gómez, Javier Lozada
- Synthesizers: Javier Lozada, Carlos Gómez, Bob Painter
- Sax: Manolo Morales
- Percussion: Henry Díaz
- Flugelhorn: José Medrano
- Chorus: María Lar, Maisa Keiser, José Flacón, Pelanganas, Janda Lándara, Sara Guinde
- Engineer: Bob Painter
- Assistant: Fernando Mingo, Jorge Gómez García
- Make-up: Sixto Nolasco
- Photography: José Manuel
- Design: Piatti/Richardson Design Associates, Inc.
- Personal Management: Artist Performers - Lynn Santiago

== Notes ==
- Track listing and credits from album cover.
- Released in Cassette Format on 1987 (DIC-10482).
- Released in CD Format on 1987 (CDDi-10482).

== Charts ==
Year	Chart	Peak
1987	Billboard Latin Pop Albums	7

=== Singles charts ===
Year	Chart	Song	Peak
1987	Billboard Hot Latin Songs	Ahora, Ahora	7
1987	Billboard Hot Latin Songs	Contigo	17
1988	Billboard Hot Latin Songs	Laberinto	16
1988	Billboard Hot Latin Songs	Eren Mágico	25
