= Mala (Yolandita Monge album) =

Studio album by Yolandita Monge
- Released: November 22, 2008
- Recorded: Buenos Aires, Miami, Puerto Rico
- Genre: Latin pop
- Length: 32:02
- Label: Universal Music Latino
- Producer: José Luis Pagán

Yolandita Monge chronology
Demasiado Fuerte (2007)	Mala (2008)	Más Para Dar (2012)

Singles from Mala
- 1. "Mala" Released: October 6, 2008; 2. "Una y Otra Vez" Released: February 6, 2009; 3. "Sin Pensarlo" Released: July 11, 2009; 4. "Oportunidad Perdida" Released: August 9, 2011

Mala (Bad) is the twenty-sixth studio album by Puerto Rican singer Yolandita Monge, released by Universal Music Latino after the acquisition of Univision Music. The album was released on November 25, 2008, and follows the same musical and lyrical style as Demasiado Fuerte and was produced by José Luis Pagán.

== Reception ==
The album achieved commercial success in Puerto Rico and some Latin America countries. A highly stylized music video for the track "Mala" was filmed.

== Track listing ==
Track	Title	Songwriter(s)	Duration
1	"Una Y Otra Vez"	José Luis Pagán, Cirilo E. Rodulfo	4:04
2	"Sin Pensarlo"	José Luis Pagán	4:08
3	"Mala"	María Isabel Saaverdra	3:15
4	"Nada Es Suficiente"	José Luis Pagán, Yoel Henríquez	4:53
5	"Oportunidad Perdida" (Feat. Víctor Manuelle)	Jorge Luis Piloto, Yoel Henríquez	4:17
6	"Sería Lamentable"	Alexis Grullón	3:42
7	"Viviré"	José Luis Pagán, María Matto	3:30
8	"Amor Del Bueno"	José Luis Pagán	3:24
9	"A Quien Le Importa"	Jorge Luis Piloto, Yoel Henríquez, Elain Morales	4:21
10	"Peor Que Tú"	Jorge Luis Piloto, Yoel Henríquez	3:50
11	"Mala" (Urban Remix) (Feat. Ivy Queen	María Isabel Saaverdra, Martha Pesante	3:19

== Credits and personnel ==
- Vocals: Yolandita Monge
- Executive Producer: Alexis Grullón
- Vocal Direction: Jorge Luis Piloto
- Arrangements & Musical Direction: José Luis Pagan
- Arrangements & Musical Direction ('Una Y Otra Vez', 'Viviré'): José Luis Pagán, Cirilo Rodulfo
- Drums: José 'Jota' Morelli
- Bass: Guillermo Vadala
- Guitars: José Luis Pagán
- Keyboards: José Luis Pagán, Cirilo Rodulfo
- Chorus: Cynthia Nilson, José Luis Pagán
- Percussion: Eduardo Avena
- Recorded: Estudios Mobile, Buenos Aires; Ultra Pop Studios, Miami; Rolo Studio, Puerto Rico
- Engineers: Gustavo 'Pichón' Dal Pont, Cirilo Rodulfo, Rolando Alejandro
- Mixing: José Luis Pagán, Ultra Pop Studios, Miami
- Mastering: Mike Couzzi, Mico Mastering Studios, Miami
- Creative Direction & Image: Carlos R. Pérez
- Graphic Design: Elastic People (Carlos R. Pérez, Kiley Del Valle)
- Photography: Mateo García
- Hair & Make-up: Fernando Báez
- Fashion Stylist: Raquel Ortiz

== Radio remixes ==
Track	Title	Collaborator(s)
1	"Mala" Urban Remix	Ivy Queen
2	"Mala" Tropical Remix	La India
3	"Uno Y Otra Vez" Urban Remix	Divino
4	"Oportunidad Perdida"	Anthony Ríos

== Singles ==
- Mala (2008)
- Una y Otra Vez (2009)
- Sin Pensarlo (2009)
- Sería Lamentable (2010)
- Oportunidad Perdida (featuring Victor Manuelle) (2011)
- Oportunidad Perdida (featuring Anthony Rios) (Radio Only) (2011)

== Promotion ==
=== Mala... Tour 2009 ===
Mala... Tour 2009
- Tour by Yolandita Monge
- Promotional poster for Yolandita's 2009 tour
- Associated album: Mala
- Start date: April 24, 2009

Yolandita Monge concert chronology
- Demasiado Fuerte (2008); Mala... Tour 2009 (2009)

A tour to promote the album will begin on April 24, 2009 in Santo Domingo, Dominican Republic. Yolandita Monge, will begin her tour in Santo Domingo, Dominican Republic, which will tour several countries in Latin America.

== Release history ==
Region	Date
Puerto Rico	November 22, 2008
Worldwide	November 25, 2008

== Charts ==
Chart (2008)	Peak position
US Billboard 200	159
US Top Latin Albums (Billboard)	3
US Latin Pop Albums (Billboard)	2

=== Singles ===
Year	Chart	Song	Peak
2008	Mala	US Hot Latin Songs (Billboard)	23
2008	Mala	US Latin Pop Airplay (Billboard)	17
2008	Mala	US Latin Rhythm Airplay (Billboard)	13
2008	Mala	US Tropical Airplay (Billboard)	15
2009	Una y Otra Vez	US Hot Latin Songs (Billboard)	35
2009	Una y Otra Vez	US Latin Pop Airplay (Billboard)	31
2009	Una y Otra Vez	US Latin Rhythm Airplay (Billboard)	17
2009	Una y Otra Vez	US Tropical Airplay (Billboard)	32
