= Mala (Yolandita Monge song) =

Single by Yolandita Monge

from the album Mala
- Released: October 6, 2008
- Recorded: 2008
- Genre: Pop; reggaeton
- Length: 3:09 (standard edition); 3:14 (urban version); 3:19 (tropical version)
- Label: Universal Music Latin Entertainment
- Songwriter(s): María Isabel Saavedra
- Producer(s): Jose Luis Pagan

Yolandita Monge singles chronology
"Amnesia" (2008)	"Mala" (2008)	"Una y Otra Vez" (2009)

"Mala" is the first single from Yolandita's 31st studio album, Mala. This song was written by Maria Isabel Saavedra and produced by Jose Luis Pagan. The Yolandita new single “Mala”, was released on October 6, 2008 on national radio.

== Music video ==
Yolandita Monge in the music video for the song "Mala".

For this video, Yolandita had to be like his song "Mala". Before the world premiere of the video, Yolandita was giving interviews, while recording it, the television network with more reports on this video recording was Univision / Telefutura. But with this, the world premiere of the music video was for the Program of Telemundo Puerto Rico, "No Te Duermas" and was a success. The first part of the music video has a strong vocabulary, so they had to cut the voice, as Yolandita saying words like, "Mierda" and "Hijo de P...". With this, she had all expectations of the success of the single. Portions of the video, was to Monge, with several dancers, were filmed several scenes Yolandita in a bathroom next to a man who is assumed to be deceived (in the fabric of the song). Also at the end of the video, she is giving a concert in a "club", all this with a leather clothes and chains embedded in clothing, making their image "Mala".

== New versions ==
Reggaeton and Tropical Official Remix

Yolandita Monge recorded the official versions or "remix" of her first single in promotion of her album, Mala. The single, recorded in reggaeton, performs with the Puerto Rican reggaetón singer Ivy Queen, and produced by the rappers, Luny Tunes.

The tropical version of this theme included the Puerto Rican singer, La India, in a first time collaboration with Monge.

== Release history ==
Region	Date
Puerto Rico	October 6, 2005
Worldwide	November 11, 2005

== Charts ==
Chart (2008–2009)	Peak position
US Hot Latin Songs (Billboard)	23
US Latin Pop Airplay (Billboard)	17
US Latin Rhythm Airplay (Billboard)	13
US Tropical Airplay (Billboard)	15
