= Yo Soy (Yolandita Monge album) =

Studio album by Yolandita Monge
- Released: 1973
- Genre: Latin pop
- Label: AudioVox Records / Disco Hits Productions
- Producer: Enrique Méndez

Yolandita Monge chronology
Recuérdame (1971)	Yo Soy (1973)	Con Todo Mi Amor..!! (1974)

Yo Soy (I Am) is the fifth (5th) studio album by Puerto Rican singer Yolandita Monge. Monge returned from Mexico to record this album in Puerto Rico under the label AudioVox Records. With this release the singer started exploring adult themed songs. It was released in 1973 and contains the radio hits Amor Mío and Estoy Celosa.

The album was first re-issued in 1987 and then in 90’s by the label Disco Hit in cassette format. It is currently out of print in all media layouts.

== Track listing ==
Track	Title	Composer(s)
1	"Cuando La Lluvia Cae"	Mirta Silva
2	"Dejaré La Llave"	D.R.
3	"Amor Mío"	Héctor Garrido, Rómulo Caicedo
4	"Estoy Celosa"	Roberto Livi
5	"Me Pasa Lo Mismo"	Roberto Livi
6	"Porqué Papá"	Roberto Livi
7	"La Música"	Héctor Garrido, Rómulo Caicedo
8	"No Creeré"	Héctor Garrido, Rómulo Caicedo
9	"Me Parece Que Tú"	D.R.
10	"Mi Ventana Triste"	Polo Márquez

== Credits and personnel ==
- Vocals: Yolandita Monge
- Producer: Enrique Méndez
- Musical Direction and Arrangements: Héctor Garrido

== Notes ==
- Track listing and credits from album cover.
- Re-released in Cassette Format by Disco Hit Productions/Aponte Latin Music Distribution (DHC-1644)
