= Demasiado Fuerte =

Studio album by Yolandita Monge
- Released: June 5, 2007
- Recorded: Miami
- Genre: Latin pop
- Length: 42:28
- Label: Univision Music
- Producer: José Luis Pagán

Yolandita Monge chronology
Sexto Sentido (2002)	Demasiado Fuerte (2007)	Mala (2008)

Singles from Demasiado Fuerte
- 1. "Y Todavía" Released: 2007; 2. "Demasiado Fuerte" Released: 2007; 3. "Sentimiento Borinqueño" Released: 2007; 4. "Amnesia" Released: 2008

Demasiado Fuerte (Too Strong) is the twenty-fifth (25th) studio album by Puerto Rican singer Yolandita Monge and was produced by José Luis Pagán. It was released in 2007 under her new contract with Univision Music. The album was featured at Billboard's chart Billboard 200 at the 112 position. Yolandita was nominated for a 2008 Billboard Award and a 2008 GLAAD Award for this record. The album debuted at number one on the Billboard Latin Pop Albums chart. This was her first studio album in over five years.

The radio hit "Y Todavía" and the title track "Demasiado Fuerte" were remixed in reggaeton style and were played on urban radio stations in Puerto Rico and the Latin communities in United States. The CD included a DVD with an exclusive interview, the music video for "Y Todavía" and three songs from the 1989 special Vivencias ("Este Amor Que Hay Que Callar", "Débil", and "Quítame A Ese Hombre Del Corazón").

== Track listing ==
Track	Title	Composer(s)	Duration
1	"Y Todavía"	María Matto, Arno Elias	4:14
2	"Demasiado Fuerte"	Jorge Luis Piloto, Yoel Henríquez	4:48
3	"La Vida Sin Tu Amor"	José Luis Pagán	4:00
4	"Cambío de Piel"	José Luis Pagán	4:11
5	"Segunda Parte"	Jorge Luis Piloto, Yoel Henríquez	4:23
6	"Amnesia"	Jorge Luis Piloto, Yoel Henríquez	4:25
7	"Te Amo Tanto"	Jorge Luis Piloto, Yoel Henríquez	4:15
8	"Y Que No Digan"	José Luis Pagán	4:26
9	"Como Una Flor"	Antonio Raúl Fernández, Carlos Javier Molina	4:21
10	"Sentimiento Borinqueño"	Marlow Rosado	3:50

== Credits and personnel ==
- Vocals: Yolandita Monge
- Artistic Direction: Jorge Luis Piloto
- Production Coordinator: LaTisha Cotto
- Arrangements: José Luis Pagán
- Arrangements & Musical Production ('Sentimiento Borincano'): Marlow Rosado
- Keyboards & Guitars: José Luis Pagan
- Drums: José 'Jota' Morelli
- Bass: Guillermo Vadala, José Velázquez
- Percussion: Juan Marras, Daniel Berroa
- Accordion Néstor Acuña
- Trumpets: Ervin Stutz, Julio Díaz
- 'Cuatro" Guitar: Quique Domenech
- Trombone: Néstor Zabala
- Chorus: José Luis Pagan, Dorita Chávez
- Recorded: Mobile Studios, Buenos Aires; Ultra Pop Studios, Miami; Pink Caos Recording Studios, Miami; Caribbean Recording Studio, Puerto Rico
- Engineers: Gustavo 'Pichón' Dal Pont, Cirilo Rodulfo, José Luis Pagán, Marlow Rosado, Víctor Sonny Hernández
- Mixing: José Luis Pagán, Ultra Pop Studios, Miami
- Mastering: Antonio Baglio, Nautilus Mastering, Italy
- Art Direction: Sonia Valentín
- Graphic Design: José Manuel Díaz
- Photography: Eric Stella
- Hair & Make-up: Miguel Angel Marrero

== DVD Music Video track listing ==
Track	Title	Songwriter(s)	Notes
1	"Este Amor Que Hay Que Callar"	Braulio	From Vivencias
2	"Débil"	Rudy Pérez, Omar Sánchez	From Vivencias
3	"Quítame A Ese Hombre del Corazón"	Jorge Luis Piloto	From Vivencias
4	"Y Todavía"	María Matto, Arno Elias	Directed by Sonia Valentín, Cinematography by Steve Biello, Edited by David Chochran

== Notes ==
- Track listing and credits from album booklet.

=== Remixes ===
Title	Songwriter(s)	Duration
"Y Todavia (Urban Remix)" (featuring Ñejo & Dalmata)	María Matto, Arno Elias, Ñejo, Dalmata	3:57
"Demasiado Fuerte (Urban Remix)" aka "Esclavos del Reloj" (featuring Arcángel & Voltio)	Yoel Henríquez, Jorge Luis Piloto, Arcángel, Voltio	3:44
"Amnesia (Bachata Remix)" (featuring Frank Reyes)	Yoel Henríquez, Jorge Luis Piloto	3:51

== Charts ==
Year	Chart	Peak
2007	Billboard Comprehensive Albums	119
2007	The Billboard 200	112
2007	Billboard Top Latin Albums	4
2007	Billboard Top Latin Pop Albums	1

=== Singles Charts ===
Year	Chart	Song	Peak
2006	Billboard Latin Pop Airplay	Siempre* (from Ole Hits... Los #1's)	35
2007	Billboard Hot Latin Songs	Y Todavía	26
2007	Billboard Latin Pop Airplay	Y Todavía	19
2007	Billboard Latin Tropical Airplay	Y Todavía	33
2007	Billboard Latin Rhythm Airplay	Y Todavía	39
2007	Billboard Latin Rhythm Airplay	Demasiado Fuerte	36
2007	Billboard Hot Latin Songs	Demasiado Fuerte	45
2007	Billboard Latin Pop Airplay	Demasiado Fuerte	24
2008	Dominican Republic Bachata National Airplay	Amnesia (featuring Frank Reyes)	1
2008	Dominican Republic Top Bachata Songs Year-End Chart	Amnesia (featuring Frank Reyes)	3
