= Harvey Averne =

American music producer

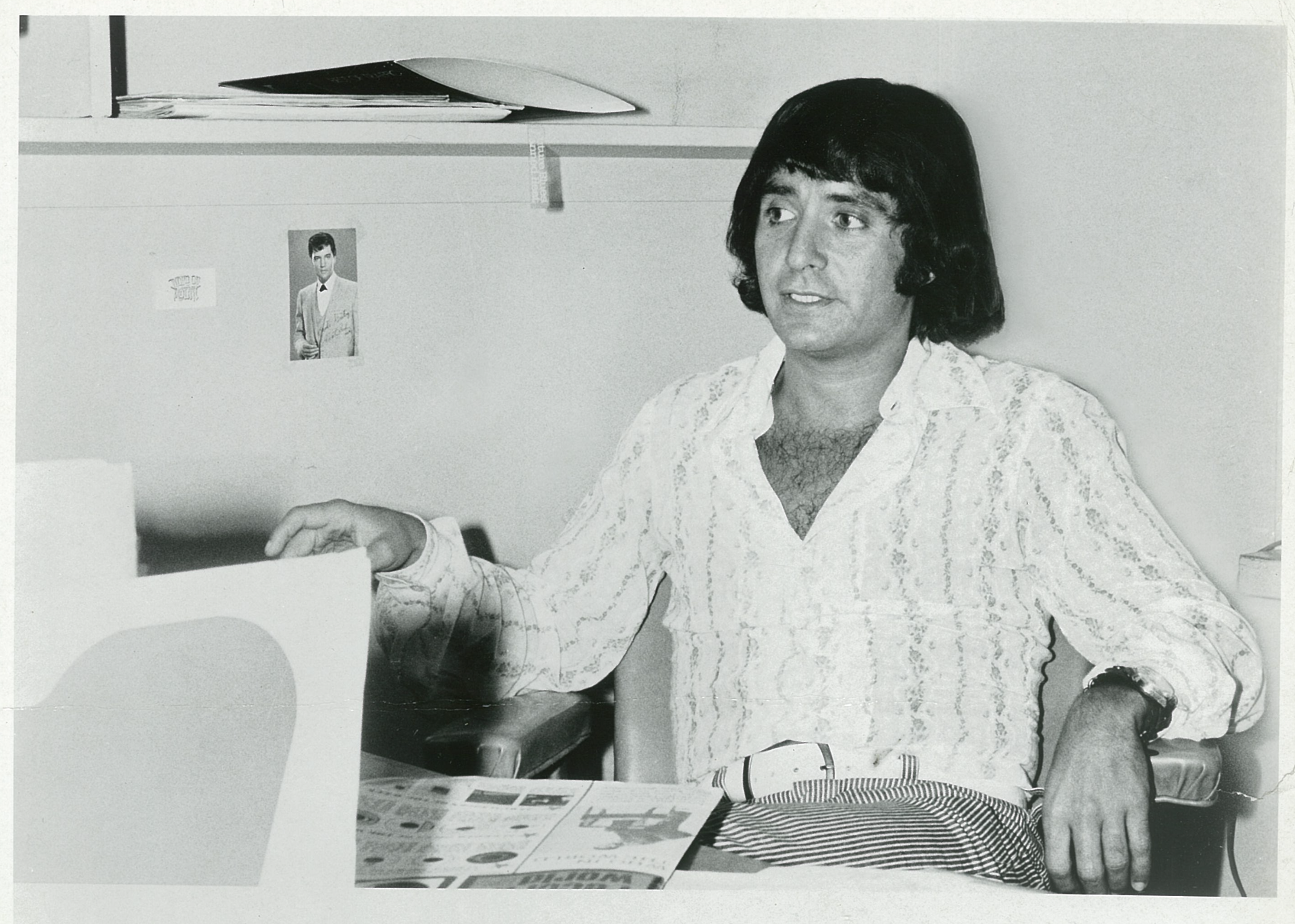
Averne in 1973

Harvey Averne (born 1936 in Brooklyn, New York) is an American record producer, musician and label owner. He has been described as "one of several prominent Jewish Americans in New York's bustling Latin music scene."

== Introduction ==
Harvey Averne is an American record producer, and the founder of CoCo Records, as well as its many subsidiaries. Established in 1972, CoCo was a label specializing in Afro-Cuban and Latin American Popular music, with special emphasis on the "New York Sound", commonly referred to as "Salsa". Averne's gift for identifying and bringing together new and established musical talent, along with the careful management of his artists' public image, initially made CoCo Records a major label nationally, and subsequently an international success. Over the next decade, he signed internationally known artists and was instrumental in bringing Latin American music into the American cultural mainstream.

In 1972 Averne signed the iconic artist Eddie Palmieri to his label, producing and mixing two of Palmieri's groundbreaking albums; Sentido and Sun Of Latin Music. These recordings were considered radical departures from the type of dance oriented music that had prevailed during the previous two decades. The latter album earned Palmieri, Averne and CoCo the first Grammy ever awarded to an artist in the newly created "Latin Music" category (1975).

The following year (1976), Averne produced and mixed a third Eddie Palmieri album (Unfinished Masterpiece), which also won the coveted Grammy award. In addition, he achieved major successes in 1977 with two Grammy nominations for his productions of the Danny Rivera and Eydie Gorme hit "Para Decir Adios" (from the album Muy Amigos) and The Machito Orchestra with Lalo Rodriguez (Fireworks). Both albums were included among the final five nominees.

In subsequent years, various artists who were signed to the CoCo family of labels also won numerous awards and nominations. The list includes such notables as Lissette Alvarez, Wilkins, Mario Bauza and Graciela, Yolandita Monge, Steve Lawrence, Trini Lopez, Rafael Cortijo, Ismael Rivera, Jose Fajardo, Charlie Palmieri, Joe Quijano and Orquesta Broadway, among others. The diversity of the CoCo catalogue actually brought a wider awareness of traditional Latin music to a new generation.

== Early life ==
By the time Averne was fourteen, he was a professional musician. During the mid-1950s through the 1970s he appeared in hundreds of reviews and shows, at New York venues as the Boulevard Night Club (Queens), The Palladium Ballroom, Lincoln Center, The Village Gate, Jules Podell's Copacabana, Roseland Ballroom, Harlem's Apollo Theater, The Cotton Club, Carnegie Hall, Basin Street East, The Cheetah and The New York Academy Of Music, as well as Chicago's Aragon Ballroom, Coliseo Roberto Clemente in Puerto Rico and the Hollywood Palladium. He found steady work and much inspiration during these years, appearing with Don Rickles, Tom Jones, Tony Bennett, Harry Belafonte, James Brown, Jerry Butler, The O'Jays, Richard Pryor, The Main Ingredient, Grover Washington Jr, Al Green, and Frankie Crocker, among others. In addition to the New York cabaret and club circuit, he performed with his own band "Arvito & His Latin Rhythms" in the Catskill Mountain Resort Area (also known as the Borscht Belt, or the Jewish Alps). He worked there from 1950 through 1963, as well as in Long Island's Lido Beach and Long Beach. He brought his dance rhythms into the Malibu Beach Club, Colony Beach Club, The Coral Reef, The Monaco, The Sands and The Shelbourne. These venues drew thousands of day-tripper/ members who arrived early to enjoy their cabanas, beaches, pools and tennis courts. Later in the evening, the patrons would dress up for dinner in the restaurants and take in shows in the nightclubs. The aforementioned clubs offered performers such as Steve Lawrence and Eydie Gorme, Jackie Mason, Mal Z. Lawrence, Al Martino, Buddy Hackett, Hines, Hines and Dad; as well as the Latin bands of Tito Puente, Machito, Tito Rodriguez, Eddie Palmieri, Larry Harlow, Joe Cuba, La Playa Sextet and of course Arvito & His Latin Rhythms. All of these stars performed regularly at both the beach clubs and the Catskill resort hotels. Amidst all of this showbiz glitz, Harvey's love for Latin American music and culture grew.

== Recording career ==
A prolific songwriter in his own right (over fifty of his songs have been recorded), Averne wrote most of the material for his newly formed group "The Harvey Averne Dozen". Their album Viva Soul, for Atlantic Records included the top selling hit "My Dream" as well as the often recorded and sampled "You're No Good", both of which are Averne-Sheller compositions. A second album for the Fania label, the self-titled Harvey Averne Dozen included Averne compositions "Accept Me", "Can You Dig It" and the international dance hit "Never Learned to Dance". It also included the movie theme "Lullaby from Rosemary's Baby" (Harvey's recording was subsequently sampled by Big Daddy Kane on his track "Rest In Peace"). He changed the name of the group to "The Harvey Averne Band" for the Fania release Brotherhood (1970). This album included various Latin crossover hits such as "Lovers", "Come Back Baby", "Come On And Do Me" and the pop hit "Central Park". Around this time he began reinvesting his songwriting success into producing, and after years of hard work as a musician he was able to make the transition.

== Producing career and CoCo Records ==
In addition to his involvement with the Fania label, Averne had other equally important projects that were also well received. In 1969 he produced, directed and mixed The Queen Does Her Own Thing for the reowned Cuban artist La Lupe. The album was released on Roulette/Tico Records and included the hit single "Se Acabo" (Once We Loved). In addition, he produced and mixed The Harvey Averne Barrio Band and Toro albums, for Heavy Duty/Fania and CoCo Records, respectively. During his tenure at Fania he either produced or supervised recordings by Ray Barretto, Willie Colon, Orquesta Harlow, Hector Lavoe, Ismael Miranda, Bobby Valentin, Mongo Santamaria, Johnny Pacheco, Roberto Roena, Joe Bataan, Ralfi Pagan, The Latinaires, and George Guzman, among others. While maintaining a managerial position as vice president, Averne was still signed to the label as a recording artist and producer (a rarity back then), and freelanced on various productions for Scepter/Wand, Heavy Duty, Uptite and Atlantic Records as well. He was later named Executive Vice President of Fania's new subsidiary Vaya Records. At Vaya he worked closely with such artists as Celia Cruz, Cheo Feliciano, Richie Ray & Bobby Cruz, Bobby Rodriguez y La Compañia, and Markolino Dimond (which featured Angel Canales's singing debut). Averne ran the Vaya label through 1971, and was responsible for all administrative functions and production.

In 1971 an obscure studio band known as The Chakachas recorded the hit single "Jungle Fever," of which Averne became the band leader. This recording sold more than two million copies and won the ASCAP Award as one of the most performed songs of the year in their catalogue. Averne also produced the crossover hit gold record "Make It With You" for the artist Ralfi Pagan (Scepter/Wand/Fania) and was appointed General Manager and Executive Vice President of United Artists' Latin Music Division (UA Latino). There, he not only signed artists but established new distribution outlets and brought promotional techniques to the label that were innovative. These were the label's most profitable years, with such international Latin stars as Raphael, Tito Rodriguez, Nelson Ned, Ismael Quintana, Morris Albert ("Feelings"), Chucho Avellanet, Martinha, Mocedades, Astor Piazzola and Jose Trellis all forming part of its huge roster. "The Harvey Averne Group" also recorded Let's Get It Together You and Me for United Artists Records.

Harvey Averne remained active as vice president and general manager of UA Latino until 1972, when he decided to create his own label, CoCo Records. By 1977 his company had gained international prominence, due to a license agreement with Spain's Zafiro Records. CoCo acquired Zafiro's catalogue for distribution in the US, which also included some Latin American territories. The roster of stars on the Zafiro label included Juan Carlos Calderon, Basilio, Juan Bau, Mocedades ("Eres Tu"), Astor Piazzola and Joan Manuel Serrat, among others. In exchange, CoCo was distributed exclusively in Spain by Zafiro. In 1979 Averne partnered with Lenny Fitchelberg and Sam Goff, forming Prism Records. The Prism label specialized in Disco dance music (a genre that peaked in popularity during the late 1970s), releasing such top ten hits as the Erotic Drum Band's "Plug Me To Death", "Not Too Young" by Alfonso, and "The Tap Dance Kid" by Ribeiro. In addition, he produced and re-mixed Regine's International Hit "Je Survivrai (I Will Survive)" and a disco version of Eric Clapton's "Cocaine" by Chi-Chi Favelas.

== After CoCo ==
Although CoCo continued to produce major hits throughout the 1970s, there were numerous financial problems and by the advent of the 1980s the record company was no longer the major force it had previously been. Averne had already relocated to France and Belgium in 1979 to work on Euro-Disco productions for Aquarius/Unidans Records, working with Jean Claude Pellerin and Jean Van Loo in production of tracks for various artists, including Patrick Hernandez, whose hit "Born To Be Alive" sold more than six million copies worldwide. While in Europe, Averne negotiated a license agreement between Aquarius/Unidans and CBS/Atomic Records for U.S. distribution. He also discovered Madonna and presented her to Aquarius/Unidans Records. The fledgling singer was hired as back-up dancer for Patrick Hernandez for his live shows and tours and was subsequently signed to her first recording contract with Aquarius/Unidans. After 1979, Averne divested his interests from his various labels and retired from the music and record business. When gambling was legalized in Atlantic City he went into the real estate and time share business there, later branching out into the state of Florida. During this time he continued to reside in New York's Upper East Side, where he lived from 1963 to 2004.

Averne has made a bit of a comeback in recent years, re-appearing on the Latin music scene in New York City. In particular, he worked with New York-based boogaloo revival band 'Spanglish Fly', led by Jonathan Goldman, to produce two of their tracks, "Brooklyn Boogaloo" and "My Shingaling Boy".

== Sampling ==
In 1993 the pioneer rapper Big Daddy Kane sampled Averne's "Lullaby from Rosemary's Baby" for the track "Rest In Peace" and released it in the Cold Chillin/Warner Bros/ Reprise album Looks Like a Job For.... In 1967, American minimalist composer Terry Riley got his hands on the song "You're No Good", a Latin-soul-boogaloo type number that had been previously released by Averne that same year. Upon hearing Averne's original track, Riley went into the studio, sampled it and created what soon became one of his all-time classic tracks (Riley's version is a great tune in its own right and is credited as "the world's first remix"). His band's Beatles cover of "I Feel Fine" is used by Tom Caruana in his mashup album Enter the Magical Mystery Chambers (2010), in which he puts Wu-Tang vocals to Beatles songs.

== Miguelito documentary ==
A documentary film was made by Australian filmmaker Sam Zubrycki about Averne's 1973 CoCo Records production entitled 'Miguelito: Canto a Borinquen.' Told by the fans and people that knew of and loved his music, 'Miguelito: Canto a Borinquen' is a film that goes on a journey that traces the mysterious disappearance of the eleven year old Puerto Rican salsa singer Miguelito and the rediscovery of his life and music decades later.

It was released on March 7, 2019.

== Discography ==
1967 The Harvey Averne Dozen "VIVA SOUL" Atlantic Records

1969 La Lupe "THE QUEEN DOES HER OWN THING" Roulette/Tico Records

1967 Orchestra Harlow "EL EXIGENTE" (featuring Ismael Miranda) Fania Records

1967 Polito Vega "CANTA PARA TI" (Producers: Johnny Pacheco/Harvey Averne) Fania Records

1967 Terry Riley "THE WORLD'S FIRST REMIX" Sampled the Harvey Averne Dozen track "You're No Good" from "Viva Soul", Atlantic Records, and is credited as The World's First Remix.

1968 Ray Barretto "ACID" Fania Records

1968 George Guzman "INTRODUCING GEORGE GUZMAN" Fania Records

1968 The Latinaires "CAMEL WALK" Fania Records

1969 The Harvey Averne Dozen "THE HARVEY AVERNE DOZEN" Fania Records

1970 Joan Manuel Serrat "MI NIÑEZ" Zafiro/CoCo Records

1970 The Harvey Averne Band "BROTHERHOOD" Fania Records

1971 The Harvey Averne Barrio Band "THE HARVEY AVERNE BARRIO BAND" Heavy Duty/Fania Records

1971 Ralfi Pagan "MAKE IT WITH YOU" Scepter/Wand/Fania Records

1971 Markolino Dimond "BRUJERIA" (Vocals: Angel Canales) Vaya/Fania Records

1971 Nelson Ned "CANCION POPULAR" United Artists Latino (1st Spanish Album)

1971 Martina "MARTINA" United Artists Latino (1st Spanish Album)

1971 Chakachas "JUNGLE FEVER" Polydor Records

1971 Vicentico Valdes "AMOR Y FELICIDAD" United Artists Latino

1971 Tito Rodriguez "RETURNS TO THE PALLADIUM LIVE" United Artists Latino

1971 Javier Oliva "SENTIMIENTO, Volume 1" United Artists Latino

1971 Tito Rodriguez "TITO RODRIQUEZ AND HIS ORCHESTRA" United Artists Latino

1972 Massiel "LO MEJOR DE MASSIEL" Zafiro/CoCo Records

1972 Mocedades "EXITOS DE ORO" Zafiro/CoCo Records

1972 Nelson Feliciano "NELSON FELICIANO" (Vocals: Junior Cordova) Mango/CoCo Records

1972 Orchestra Dee Jay "ORCHESTRA DEE JAY" (Vocals: Rafael de Jesus) Mango/CoCo Records

1973 Paul Ortiz y La Orquesta Son "MEREMBE" Mango/CoCo Records

1973 Eddie Palmieri "SENTIDO" (Vocals: Ismael Quintana) Mango/CoCo Records

1973 Nelson Feliciano / Kito Velez "Vida Eterna" (Vocals: Joe P.) CoCo Records

1973 Miguelito "CANTO A BORIÑQUEN" CoCo Records

1973 Eddie Palmieri & Friends "LIVE IN CONCERT AT THE UNIVERSITY OF PUERTO RICO" (Vocals: Ismael Quintana; Guest: Charlie Palmieri on organ) CoCo Records

1973 Les Chakachas (of "Jungle Fever" fame) "TIBIDIBANG" Biram Records

1974 Juan Bau "PENAS" Zafiro/CoCo Records

1974 Orquesta La Corporacion Latina "EL ORGULLO DE PUERTO RICO" Lamp/CoCo Records

1974 Cortijo "CORTIJO Y SU MAQUINA DEL TIEMPO" (CORTIJO & HIS TIME MACHINE) CoCo Records

1974 Cesta All Stars "LIVE JAM SESSION" Featuring: Charlie Palmieri, Cheo Feliciano, Joe Quijano, Kako, Yayo El Indio, Louie Ramirez & many more... CoCo Records

1974 Charlie Palmieri "ELECTRO DURO" (Vocal: Victor Velaquez) CoCo Records

1974 Joe Quijano (2 LP set) "UN REGALO DE SALSA EN NAVIDAD" Featuring Tito Puente, Charlie Palmieri, Cheo Feliciano, Cortijo, Fajardo, Cachao, Vitin Aviles & many more... CoCo Records

1974 Cortijo y Su Combo Original "JUNTOS OTRA VEZ" Con ISMAEL RIVERA - Historic Live Concert and Recording with The Original Combo, including Rafael Ithier, Roberto Roena, Roy Rosario, Sammy Ayala, Eddie Perez, Martin Quiñones, Kito Velez, Mario Cora, Miguel Cruz, Hector Santos, Andy Montañez. (Presented, produced, directed & mixed Harvey Averne). CoCo Records

1975 Eddie Palmieri "THE SUN OF LATIN MUSIC" (Vocal: Lalo Rodriguez) CoCo Records

1975 Mocedades "LA OTRA ESPAÑA" Zafiro/CoCo Records

1975 Joe Quijano y Su Orquesta "AHORA" CoCo Records

1975 Jose Fajardo "FAJARDO Y SUS ESTRELLAS DEL '75" CoCo Records

1975 Charlie Palmieri "IMPULSOS (IMPULSES)" (Vocal: Victor Velaquez) CoCo Records

1975 Orquesta Broadway "SALVAJE (SAVAGE)" CoCo Records

1975 Eddie Palmieri "UNFINISHED MASTERPIECE" (Vocal: Lalo Rodriguez) CoCo Records

1975 Joe Quijano "EXITOS DE ORO (GOLDEN HITS)" CoCo Records

1975 Yolandita Monge "FLORECIENDO" CoCo Records

1975 Toro (band) "TORO" Heavy Duty/CoCo Records

1976 Harvey Averne Barrio Band "ROCK 'N LATIN" [reissue] CoCo Records

1976 Eddie Palmieri "UNFINISHED MASTERPIECE" (Vocal: Lalo Rodriguez) Philips Records (Japan)

1976 Cortijo y Su Nuevo Combo "CHAMPIONS" (Vocals: Fe Cortijo and Che Delgado) CoCo Records

1976 Noraida y Los Morés "LA BARBARA" CoCo Records

1976 Jose Fajardo "LA RAIZ DE LA CHARANGA (CHARANGA ROOTS)" CoCo Records

1976 Cesta All Stars "SALSA FESTIVAL" CoCo Records

1976 Orquesta Broadway "PASAPORTE" CoCo Records

1976 Yolandita Monge "REFLEXIONES" CoCo Records

1976 Cortijo "CORTIJO YSU MAQUINA DEL TIEMPO (CORTIJO & HIS TIME MACHINE)" Philips Records (Japan)

1976 Eddie Palmieri "SPOTLIGHT ON EDDIE PALMIERI" Philips Records (Japan) - Licensed material

1976 Eydie Gorme "LA GORME" Gala/CoCo Records

1976 Danny Rivera "ALBORADA" Graffit/CoCo Records

1976 Alberto Carrion "PAJAROS MARINOS" Graffiti/CoCo Records

1976 Sergio y Estibaliz "QUIEN COMPRA UNA CANCION" Zafiro/CoCo Records

1976 Marisol "HABLAME DEL MAR MARINERO" Zafiro/CoCo Records

1976 Paco Martin "AÑORANZAS" Zafiro/CoCo Records

1976 Juan Bau "FANTASIA" Zafiro/CoCo Records

1976 Mocedades "EL COLOR DE TU MIRADA" Zafiro/CoCo Records

1976 Jarcha "LIBERTAD SIN IRA" Zafiro/CoCo Records

1977 Cortijo y Su Combo "CABALLO DE HIERRO" (Vocal: Fe Cortijo) CoCo Records

1977 Machito Orchestra "FIREWORKS" (Vocal: Lalo Rodriquez) CoCo Records

1977 Charlie Palmieri "EL GIGANTE Y SU ORQUESTA COLOSAL" (Vocal: Victor Velasquez) CoCo Records

1977 Eddie Palmieri "1973-1976 GOLD" (Vocals: Lalo Rodriguez and Ismael Quintana) CoCo Records

1977 Raffy Diaz "RAFFY DIAZ Y SU ORQUESTA" CoCo Records

1977 Graciela y Mario Bauza "LA BOTANICA" Lamp/CoCo Records

1977 Orquesta Cimarron "ERUPCION" Lamp/CoCo Records

1977 Yolandita Monge "SOY ANTE TODO MUJER" CoCo Records

1977 Orquesta Broadway "NEW YORK CITY SALSA" CoCo Records

1977 Jose Fajardo "SELECIONES CLASICAS" CoCo Records

1977 Steve Lawrence "TU SERAS MI MUSICA" Gala/CoCo Records

1977 Eydie Gorme y Danny Rivera "MUY AMIGOS" (With the Mega Hit "Para Decir Adios") Gala/CoCo Records

1977 Trini Lopez "TRINI LOPEZ Y SU ALMA LATINA" Gala/CoCo Records

1977 Danny Rivera "PARA TODA LA VIDA" Graffiti/CoCo Records

1977 Alberto Carrion "BORIÑQUEN" Graffiti/CoCo Records

1977 Mocedades "8" Zafiro/CoCo Records

1977 Basilio "DEMASIADO AMOR" Zafiro/CoCo Records

1977 Juan Bau "5" Zafiro/CoCo Records

1977 Danny Rivera "SERENATA" Graffiti/CoCo Records

1977 Orquesta Tipica Ideal "FUERA DEL MUNDO (Out Of This World)" (Canta: Victor Velasquez) CoCo Records

1977 Lalo Rodriguez "ME LLAMAN LALO (They Call Me Lalo)" CoCo Records

1977 Orquesta La Corporacion Latina "TRULLANDO CON LA CORPORACION LATINA" CoCo Records

1977 Los Andinos "LA NUEVA IMAGEN DE LOS ANDINOS" CoCo Records

1977 Wilkins "AMARSE UN POCO" CoCo Records

1977 Los Andinos "YO QUIERO SER TU AMANTE" CoCo Records

1977 Lissette Alvarez "SOLA" (With the Mega Hit "COPACABANA") CoCo Records

1977 Harvey Averne Presenta "BOLEROS DEL AMOR" Featuring: Eddie Palmieri, Orchestra Broadway, Orquesta La Corporacion Latina, Charlie Palmieri, Cheo Feliciano, Machito, Cortijo, Cesta All Stars, Lalo Rodriguez, Ismael Quintana, Graciela Y Mario Bauza, Fe Cortijo, Joe Quijano, Raffy Diaz, Victor Velaquez, Willie Torres, Felo Barrios. CoCo Records

1977 Eddie Palmieri "EXPLORATION" CoCo Records

1977 La Controversia "VISION DIVINA" CoCo Records

1978 Various Artists "BORIÑQUEN" CoCo Records

1978 Astor Piazzola /Jose Trellis "BALADA PARA UN LOCO" Zafiro/CoCo Records

1978 Jose Fajardo "EL TALENTO TOTAL" CoCo Records

1978 Orquesta Broadway "NEW YORK CITY SALSA" CoCo Records

1978 Various Artists "SALSA DISCO FEVER" Featuring: Eddie Palmieri, Puerto Rico All Stars, Andy Montañez, Cortijo y Su Combo Original con Ismael Rivera, Orquesta Broadway, Fe Cortijo, Cesta All Stars featuring Charley Palmieri, Machito, Jose Fajardo, Lalo Rodriguez, Graciela y Mario, Raffy Diaz. CoCo Records

1978 Yolandita Monge "EN SU INTIMIDAD" CoCo Records

1978 Yolandita Monge "CIERA LOS OJOS Y JUNTOS RECORDEMOS" CoCo Records

1978 Lalo Rodriguez "EVOLUCION" CoCo Records

1978 Eddie Palmieri "TIMELESS" CoCo Records

1978 Ismael Rivera "SONERO NUMERO UNO" CoCo Records

1978 Sergio y Estibaliz "CANCIONES SUDAMERICANAS" Zafiro/CoCo Records

1978 Juan Bau "CON MIS CINCOS SENTIDOS" Zafiro/CoCo Records

1978 Hernaldo "CANCIONERO" Zafiro/CoCo Records

1978 Alejandro Jaen "MIS PROPIOS SENTIMIENTOS" Zafiro/CoCo Records

1978 Don Francisco y Jose Luis "DON FRANCISCO Y JOSE LUIS" Zafiro/CoCo Records

1979 Alfonso Ribeiro "NOT TOO YOUNG" Prism Records

1979 Various Artists "CHARANGA AFTER HOURS" Jose Fajardo, Orquesta Broadway, Tipica Ideal. CoCo Records

1979 Regine "JE SURVRIVE (I Will Survive)" Prism Records

1995 Lalo Rodriguez "NACI PARA CANTAR" EMI Latino Records

1998 Various Artists "NUYORICAN ROOTS" Tito Puente, Arsenio Rodriguez, Tito Rodriguez, Eddie Palmieri, Ray Barretto, Machito, Harlow, Mongo Santamaria, Joe Cuba, Harvey Averne. Soul Jazz Records

2000 Various Artists "SWEET SIDE OF LATIN SOUL" Lebron Brothers, Azuqita, Orchestra Dee Jay, Ralfi Pagan, Harvey Averne. Latin Soul Records

2000 Terry Riley "THE WORLD"S FIRST REMIX" Sampled the Harvey Averne Dozen track "You're No Good" from "Viva Soul", Atlantic Records. Originally released in 1967 and credited as The World's First Remix, Re-Released 2000. Cortical Foundation

2003 Various Artists "HIDDEN TREASURE" Celia Cruz, Tito Puente, Richie Ray & Bobby Cruz, Orquesta Broadway, the Latinaires, Joe Bataan, New Swing Sextette, Alfredito, Johnny Rivera, Ralph Robles, Harvey Averne. Fania Records

2005 Eddie Palmieri "EL PRODIGIOSO, LOS 50 AÑOS DEL MAESTRO" (All Music Produced & Mixed By Harvey Averne; Compilation Produced by Richie Viera) MP/J&N Records

2005 Various Artist "EXPLOSIVOS" Tito Puente, Charlie Palmieri, Eddie Palmieri, Joe Cuba, Bobby Valentine, Jimmy Sabater, Joey Pastrana, Monguito Santamaria, Alfredito, George Guzman, Chacon, King Nando, Harvey Averne. Vampi Soul Records

2007 Various Artists "NEW YORK LATIN HUSTLE! THE SOUND OF NEW YORK" Tito Puente, Eddie Palmieri, Ray Barretto, Willy Colon, Rafael Cortijo, Joe Cuba, Al Escobar, Machito, Candido, Seguida, Jose Mangual, La Charanga 76, Louie Ramirez, Ismael Quinones, Harvey Averne. Soul Jazz Records

2007 Various Artists "A SALSA TRIBUTE TO THE BEATLES" Tito Puente, La Lupe, Santitos Colon, Larry Harlow, Richie Ray & Bobby Cruz, Joe Bataan, Joey Pastrana, Orquesta Novel, Ralfi Pagan, L.T.G. Exchange, Harvey Averne. Universal Records

2008 Various Artists "DANCE THE LATIN... (Swingin' Mambos, Soulful Salsa and Funky Rhythms from the Hip Latin Dancefloors of New York City)" Noro Morales, Eddie Palmieri, Cal Tjader, Tito Puente, Ray Barretto, Mongo Santamaria, La Lupe, Joe Bataan, Bobby Valentine, Mauricio Smith, George Guzman, Pete Rodriguez, Chollo, Al Escobar, the Latinaires, Harvey Averne. Jazzman Records [JMANCD 019]

2008 Various Artists "EL BARRIO: BACK ON THE STREETS OF SPANISH HARLEM" Fania All Stars, Tito Puente, Ray Barretto, Willie Colon, Roberto Roena, Johnny Colon, Lebron Brothers, Bobby Marin, Ralfi Pagan, Joey Pastrana, Tony Middleton, Bobby Matos, Harvey Averne. Emusica/UMG Records

2008 Various Artists "EL BARRIO: LATIN FUNK / NUYORICAN FUNK 1968–1976" Fania All Stars, Ray Barretto, Mongo Santamaria, Joe Bataan, Jimmy Sabater, The TNT Boys, Monguito Santamaria, Ralfi Pagan, Azuquita, Cafe, Chollo Rivera, Seguida, Harvey Averne. Emusica/UMG Records

2009 Harvey Averne "NEVER LEARNED TO DANCE, ANTHOLOGY 1967–1971". Emusica/UMG Records

2011 About Group "YOU'RE NO GOOD" Sampled the Harvey Averne Dozen track and composition "You're No Good" from "Viva Soul", Atlantic Records. The 10:00 minute first single from their 2011 Album "Start & Complete" is a tribute to the 1967 Terry Riley "World's First Remix" and Sample of Harvey Averne's track "You're No Good". Domino Records

2011 Various Artists "EL BARRIO: THE ULTIMATE COLLECTION OF LATIN BOOGALOO, DISCO, FUNK & SOUL" (4-CD Box Set) Fania All Stars, Tito Puente, La Lupe, Eddie Palmieri, Johnny Ventura, Ray Barretto, Willie Colon, Orchestra Harlow, Mongo Santamaria, Joe Cuba, Ralfi Pagan, Joe Bataan, Chollo Rivera, Jimmy Sabater, Azuquita, Orquesta Novel, Gilberto Cruz, Louie Ramirez, Fausto Rey, Lou Perez, Cafe, Ralph Robles, Vladimir, Bobby Valentin, Lennie Sesar, The TNT Boys, New Swing Sextette, Pete Bonet, Roberto Roena, Johnny Colon, Ray Rodriguez, The Latinaires, Pete Rodriguez, King Nando, Joey Pastrana, George Guzman, Monguito Santamaria, Harvey Averne. Fania/Codigo Music Records

2012 Spanglish Fly, New York City's original boogaloo revival band. (Hit Record: "Brooklyn Boogaloo" b/w "My Shingaling Boy"; Produced, Mixed and Directed by Harvey Averne)

2012: Chico Alvarez (El Montunero) & The Palmonte Afro-Cuban Big Band "Country Roots/Urban Masters" (Produced By Chico Alvarez and Jerry Lacay; Album Project Consultant: Harvey Averne; Mixed by Harvey Averne, Chico Alvarez and Kamilo Kratc)

2012 Various Artists "GLASS ONION, SONGS OF THE BEATLES". Aretha Franklin, Ella Fitzgerald, Little Richard, Bill Cosby, Carmen McRae, Shirley Scott, Eddie Cano, Nino Tempo, King Curtis, Arif Mardin, Herbie Mann, Tamico Jones, The Harvey Averne Dozen & many more... From the Vaults of Warner Music Group and Atlantic Records.

2013 HBO Series "EASTBOUND & DOWN". Final Season Four, Chapter 28 (Utilized The Harvey Averne Band Original Song & Track Sync "LET'S GET IT TOGETHER THIS CHRISTMAS"; Composed by Harvey Averne, Publisher Whistle Music BMI)

2014 "BARRALOADASOUL" Documentary filmed at the Glasgow Barrowland Ballroom, Scotland (Featured track sync "NEVER LEARNED TO DANCE" by The Harvey Averne Band; composed by Harvey Averne, Publisher Whistle Music BMI)

2014 Various Artists "THE 60's VOLUME ONE" Fania All Stars, Ray Barretto, Willie Colon, Johnny Pacheco, Monguito, Larry Harlow, Bobby Valentine, Louie Ramirez, Joe Bataan, Harvey Averne. Fania/Codigo Music Records.

2014 VARIOUS ARTISTS "THE 60's VOLUME FIVE" Eddie Palmieri, Ray Barretto, Joe Cuba, Willie Colon, Hector Lavoe, Johnny Pacheco, Machito y Graciela, Bobby Valentin, Joe Bataan, Ralfi Pagan, The Latin Blues Band, Johnny Colon, Lebron Brothers, Jimmy Sabater, The Harvey Averne Dozen. Fania/Codigo Music Records
