= Pa' Que Te Lo Goces =

- Country of origin: Puerto Rico
- Original language: Spanish

Original release
- Release: September 10, 2006

Pa' Que Te Lo Goces was a Puerto Rican variety show directed by Tony Mojena. It aired on Telemundo Puerto Rico. It included comedies, charity campaigns, gossip, news, reality shows, contests, and singers, celebrities, and other special guests. Each section had its own host. The main show was hosted by Luis Raúl and Gricel Mamery.

Its catch phrase was: "Si no lo viste, te lo perdiste" (If you didn't see it, you missed it). It was created by Luis Raúl.

== Production ==
The show last aired on September 10, 2006. The show was cancelled due to low ratings, weak ad sales, and strong competition from Univisión's number one show in ratings, Que Suerte, by Hector Marcano.

== Segments ==
The program had various sections, including:

- "No Estás Solo": A person with a family problem or personal problem was invited to the show to resolve the problem.
- "Algun Día": Problems that can happen to anyone experienced by a guest.
- A gossip section called "Dicen Por Ahí" covered local and international gossip.
- A tarot reader section called "Encuentro Mágico con Patricia", in which viewers in.
- "Aguanta Presión": A hidden camera segment in which a person tried to pressure someone on the streets. Similar to Candid Camera. If the person resisted the tempatation, they won money.
- "Las Maletas": Several people in the live audience were randomly picked to participate for cash. Each received a briefcase with an amount of cash written on a card inside it. If the contestant guessed the number correctly, they won the amount that they guessed. The ranges were from $500 to $5,000.
- "Pégate Pa' Que Goces" involved a box with balls that each contained a number. The participant had to pick a number, if the number the person picked was on at least one of the three balls, they won.

Their weekly panel, in which the hosts and reporters discussed the most talked about the topic of the week.

== Hosts ==
The hosts were Luis Raúl and Gricel Mamery, who followed original hosts Alexandra Fuentes, Johnny Lozada, and Fransheska Revilla.

== History ==
In December 2005, the three main hosts were changed. In May 2006, comedians and DJs were removed.

== Reality sections ==
- Puerto Rico Baila (Puerto Rico Dances): People competed in dancing to win a starting role in Las Estrellas Bailan 3.
- Las Estrellas Bailan (The Stars Dance): Famous Puerto Ricans who are not dancers, participated to win money for a charity. Season 1 (won by Angelique Burgos "La Burbu") and 2 finished.
- La Casa De Cristal (The Crystal House): Two couples lived inside a public crystal house for four weeks.
- Puerto Rico al Límite (Puerto Rico to the limit): The winner stayed in a Chevrolet Equinox for 42 days.

== Cancelled sections ==
- La Verdad Tras La Noticia
- Bembeteo
- Comedias Sálvese Quien Pueda (e.g. No Te Entra El 4, Rayos Yaga, Objetivo Flema, and others)
- Sala De Espera
- WPQTLG Radio Station

== Parody ==
On Televicentro's parody show, TV Ilegal, Pa' Que Te Lo Goces was parodied several times. The parody name was "Pa' Que Te Lo Roces".
