= Javier Ceriani =

Argentine television and radio host and actor (born 1971)

Javier Ceriani (born 25 January 1971 in Buenos Aires, Argentina) is an Argentine television and radio show host and actor. He was a co-host, along with Elisa Beristain, of a gossip show named "Chisme No Like" and was a contestant on Survivor Mexico 2022. Ceriani is a resident of the United States.

As of 2025, he hosts "Javier Ceriani" on Sirius XM.

== Biography ==
Ceriani was born in Buenos Aires. In 2001, Ceriani moved to Miami, Florida. In 2018, "Chisme No Like" debuted on YouTube, co-hosted by Ceriani and Eliza Beristain. On 21 November 2024, the show was cancelled. Internal conflicts led to the cancellation of the show.

In 2010, Ceriani earned an Emmy Award for his interview with Virginia Vallejo, Pablo Escobar's former lover. Ceriani has two Emmy Awards.

In 2025, Ceriani had a new show on SiriusXM, the eponymous show, "Javier Ceriani".

=== Controversies ===
Ceriani has been involved in a series of controversies:

- Gricel Mamery: In 2013, Ceriani was pictured during the Fiestas de San Sebastian celebrations in Puerto Rico, touching private parts of, and kissing, Puerto Rican show host Gricel Mamery. Mamery's brother Topy Mamery insulted Ceriani on Kobbo Santarrosa's show SuperXclusivo.
- Edgardo Diaz: The Puerto Rican boy band manager and former director of Menudo was approached at home by Ceriani, who flew to Puerto Rico to find Diaz and accuse him of pedophilia. Ceriani had spoken about the accusations against Diaz several times during "Chisme No Like", including interviews with several former members of the band.
- Imelda Garza Tunon: Mexican singer Imelda Garza Tunon and Ceriani were involved in a scandal concerning her son, which she had with Julian Figueroa, during 2025. He challenged her to prove that he had bought witnesses for his reports concerning her.

== Personal ==
Ceriani lived in a luxury apartment in Miami. He had to move out in 2019.

== See also ==
- List of Argentines
