= El Show de las 12 =

Puerto Rican midday variety television series (1965–2005)

- Genre: Variety Show
- Created by: Francisco "Paquito" Cordero
- Presented by: Eddie Miró; Miguel Ángel Álvarez; Camilo Delgado; Yoyo Boing
- Country of origin: Puerto Rico
- Original language: Spanish
- No. of seasons: 40

Production
- Executive producer: Francisco "Paquito" Cordero
- Camera setup: Multi-camera
- Running time: 60 Minutes
- Production company: Paquito Cordero Productions

Original release
- Network: WKAQ-TV
- Release: January 11, 1965 – February 25, 2005

Related
- SuperXclusivo

El Show de las 12 (English: The 12 O'Clock Show) was a Puerto Rican midday variety television series that aires on WKAQ-TV, and later on the nationwide Telemundo network. It was hosted by Eddie Miró for most of its run and aired every weekday for forty years until its cancellation on February 25, 2005.

== History ==
Paquito Cordero was working for El Mundo Enterprises as the company launched the first television station in Puerto Rico WKAQ-TV also known as Telemundo in 1964. Cordero approached station owner, Angel Rámos with the idea for a variety show that would feature music and comedy. Rámos accepted the idea and thus El Show de las 12 (The 12 O'Clock Show) was born with its first episode airing on January 11, 1965

The show would air live every day at noon from studio two at WKAQ-TV studios in San Juan, Puerto Rico and would air in front of a live studio audience of about 300 people that were given admission for free into the program. In 1995, WKAQ decided to name the studio after the creator and long time executive producer of the program, henceforth the space would be known as "Estudio 2: Paquito Cordero" (Studio 2: Paquito Cordero). Today the studio is home to comedian Raymond Arrieta's show Raymond y sus Amigos (Raymond and Friends)

=== Music ===
El Show de las 12 was known for its live music performances. Every day the show would kickoff with a live performance from an up-and-coming musical act. Many Puerto Rican and International musicians had their first televised performance on El Show de las 12 including El Gran Combo de Puerto Rico, Marc Anthony, Menudo, Conjunto Quisqueya, Chayanne, Raphael, Julio Iglesias, among others. Throughout its run El Show de las 12 became a pivotal platform to launch music stars in Puerto Rico and for those Latino stars to breakthrough in the United States.

=== Comedy ===
Just as it helped launch the careers of music stars, El Show de las 12 was also significant in helping many Puerto Rican comedians breakthrough. When there wasn't music playing, comedians would be performing skits and recurring segments on the show. El Show de las 12 was the starting ground for Puerto Rican comedians such as Awilda Carbia, Shorty Castro, Otilio Warrington, Luis Antonio Cosme, Ángela Meyer, Raulito Carbonell, among others.

=== La Comay ===
In 1989, after becoming a recurring character on rival station WAPA-TV alongside Luisito Vigoreaux the character of "La Condesa del Bochinche" (The Countess of Gossip), a gossip reporting puppet controlled by Kobbo Santarrosa, made the jump to WKAQ-TV and was given a segment on El Show de las 12. The segment was originally not well received and the character went through an overhaul changing the look of the puppet and renaming it "La Comay" (The Godmother). La Comay would share her segment with the host of El Show de las 12 Eddie Miró who would encourage the character to share more details of the gossip they were presenting. This version of the character became a success and would eventually receive a spinoff show called XClusivo (Exclusive) that would air on Thursdays at 9:30 p.m. with Miró also serving as a co-host. Eventually the character's success led Santarrosa back to WAPA-TV where the show SuperXclusivo was born, Miró received an offer to join Santarrosa on WAPA-TV but he cited his loyalty to El Show de las 12 and WKAQ-TV as a reason to refuse the offer.

=== Cancellation and legacy ===
By the early 2000s El Show de las 12 and WKAQ-TV as a whole was experiencing a sharp decline. In 2001, NBC Universal would acquire Telemundo and its Owned-and-operated stations with the company officially becoming the sole owner of WKAQ-TV in 2004.

The acquisition by NBC Universal brought harsh cost-cutting measures for WKAQ-TV. The parent company decided to scrap all local programming in favor of cheap imported international shows which in turn meant the cancellation of El Show de las 12. On February 25, 2005, just a month after celebrating the show's 40th anniversary, El Show de las 12 aired its final episode. Due to the show being a daily live show that began in the early 60s most of the tapes of the show were lost in time, however, the surviving tapes of the program were donated to the school of communications at the University of Puerto Rico along with every other tape of Paquito Cordero Productions upon Cordero's death in 2009. WKAQ-TV has christened two of its studios with the names of figures of El Show de las 12, Studio 2 (where El Show de las 12 used to take place) carries the name of Paquito Cordero and Studio 3 (where Puerto Rico Gana and Rayos X broadcasts from) carries the name Eddie Miró.

On January 16, 2017, twelve years after the cancellation of El Show de las 12, WKAQ-TV began airing a midday variety program again. Alexandra a las 12 (Alexandra at Noon) is hosted by Alexandra Fuentes and features interviews, news, political analysis and, comedy segments. Though it does not feature daily musical performances nor a live studio audience (the show broadcasts from the station's news studio) it is the spiritual successor to El Show de las 12 and has seen moderate success for WKAQ-TV on the time slot. The show was expanded to start at 11:30 a.m. in 2021.
