= Milly Cangiano =

Puerto Rican journalist

Milagros "Milly" Cangiano is a Puerto Rican television and newspaper celebrity reporter and producer. She has covered news events in Puerto Rico, Mexico and Miami, Florida.

== Early life ==
Cangiano was born in Ponce, Puerto Rico, on June 5th, 1950. Cangiano studied at the National Autonomous University of Mexico in Mexico.

== Television work ==
Cangiano has produced the Puerto Rican telecast of the Gymnastics World Cup as well as the Gran Regata Colón and the Festival de Bahia. She also created a well known children's television character, "Burbujita". She produced a television show on Super Siete channel centered around that character and the character's male friend, "Bolillo". Later, the show moved to Tele-Once, after Super Siete was sold.

Cangiano has also appeared in front of the television cameras. During 2008, she was hired as co-host, along with "Papo" Brenes, of "Anda Pa'l Cará", a television gossip show at Tele-Once.

== Radio ==
Cangiano co-hosted, along with Marisol Malaret and Carmen Jovet, a radio show in Puerto Rico during the 1990s, named "El Poder de la Maňana". It was there that one morning, a little girl that Cangiano identified as "Pilarcita" called and suggested that the main children's character at the show, the doll that would later be known as "Burbujita", seemed to live inside a bubble, thus inadvertently leading Cangiano to rename the character to "Burbujita".

== Controversies ==
Cangiano has been involved in several controversies due to her comments on Puerto Rican television and on newspaper Primera Hora. One of the people who has been involved in a controversy with her was Puerto Rican Merengue singer Giselle, who in 2024 got angry at a comment Cangiano made regarding Manny Manuel missing a show he had scheduled on 21 July 2024 at Morovis,.

Gricel Mamery is another celebrity who has spoken out against Cangiano; in 2015, Mamery got upset at comments Cangiano made after Mamery left a Puerto Rican television show named "TV Ilegal". Mamery called Cangiano "poisonous".

== See also ==
- Kobbo Santarrosa
- List of Puerto Ricans
