= Roque Gallart =

Puerto Rican radio and television personality, and actor

- Born: September 21, 1977 (age 48); Puerto Rico
- Occupations: Television host, radio host, actor
- Years active: 1995-present
- Known for: El Despelote
- Television: Lo Sé Todo; Descarao Por La Noche; La Comay; Los HP

Roque José Gallart Ortiz, (born September 21, 1977) also known as Rocky the Kid, is a Puerto Rican broadcaster personality and occasional actor.

Gallart was host of a Mega-TV television show named Descarao Por La Noche (2017). Later on, Gallart and Danilo Beauchamp created a comedic sketch called Los HP. Gallart replaced Héctor Travieso as co-host La Comay for the remainder of the show's run on Mega TV. In 2023, the word perreo was included in the dictionary of the Real Academia Española and Rocky The Kid was the first to use that Spanish slang term in 1999 on the radio program "El Despelote" to describe or to say when they have a romantic date. "voy a tener un perreo".

== Biography ==
Roque José Gallart Ortiz is the son of Roque Gallart, Sr., himself a well-known radio announcer. Roque, Jr. would visit his dad's radio station and stay there until a school bus picked him up as a little kid. Roque, Jr. became interested in radio work during this era in his life. In 1995, at age 16, he was hired by the radio station where his father worked, 95X, in the Puerto Rican city of Bayamon. He studied communications at Universidad del Sagrado Corazon in Santurce.

== Acting ==
Rocky the Kid became a well-known radio host in Puerto Rico over the years, and his fame allowed him to branch out into other areas of the show business world, starting in 2010, when he participated in "Que Despelote! La pelicula", playing himself along with fellow radio personalities, actors and friends Tony Banana and Billy Fourquet. He then re-joined Fourquet in a 2011 comedy film named "Que Joyitas!", where he again played a version of himself.

In 2013, Gallart again played himself in Que Joyitas! II, in which he was featured in the movie's poster. The three movies that Gallart has been in have been released in local cinemas in Puerto Rico, and Que Joyitas! has been shown in the United States television on Cine Latino.

== Lo Sé Todo ==
Following a severe boycott by sponsors of Kobbo Santarrosa's gossip show, SuperXclusivo, WAPA America took that show off the air, and then hired six people, including Pedro Juan Figueroa, Sylvia Hernandez, Topy Mamery and Gallart, to host a new television show named "Lo Se Todo" in 2013. "Lo Se Todo" became a successful and highly rated show on Puerto Rican television, but internal turmoil plagued the show almost from the beginning. In 2014, Gallart once played a Black character in the show, with monkey sounds played in the background. As a consequence, the network received several calls from complaining viewers, which led to Gallart issuing a public apology in which he stated his intention was never to offend anyone based on race, religion, birthplace, or sexual preference, and a network producer to be fired.

Early in 2015, Gallart decided to leave "Lo Se Todo" after his radio employer, SBS, told him he would not be allowed to work with them and at WAPA-America consecutively. Offered a contract by WAPA-America on 6 December 2014, Gallart did not sign it, deciding instead to keep working on radio. The contract offer by WAPA-America came only 4 days after Mamery, who had also left "Lo Se Todo" and whom Gallart had befriended, died of a heart attack. Following the news of his friend's death, Gallart cried on live television.

In April 2015, Gallart declared on his radio show that "Lo se Todo" television personnel were victims of workplace harassment by show producer Niria Ruiz, also mentioning Joe Ramos in his comment, calling Pedro Juan Figueroa a hypocrite and traitor who never took the other hosts side against "Lo Se Todo" producers during arguments, affirming that Frankie Jay, another of the show's hosts, did so, and describing working conditions at "Lo Se Todo" as a "living hell".

As a consequence of those statements, on 31 August 2015, WAPA-America sued Gallart for the amount of $2,000,000 dollars, accusing him of defamation.

== Move to Mega-TV ==
On 9 March 2015, Gallart began a new television show on Mega-TV, a Hispanic channel in the United States. The show, named "Descarao' Por La Noche" was seen in Puerto Rico and various cities in the United States, including Phoenix, New York City, LA and San Francisco, Houston, Miami and Chicago, among others.

== Personal ==
Gallart is married to "Lo Se Todo" host Jessica Serrano. Their first daughter as a couple, Emma Catalina Gallart Serrano, was born on 14 November 2015. He also has a son, Ricky, from an earlier relationship, and a step-daughter, Carolina.

Gallart was arrested and briefly jailed in November 2013 by Puerto Rican police after allegedly sending threatening messages to a former girlfriend. He was released almost immediately when a judge found no cause against him. He is also active in a COVID-19 agenda pro vaccine (2019–Present Day).

== See also ==
- List of Puerto Ricans
