= TV Ilegal =

Puerto Rican comedy television show

- Genre: Live-action
- Created by: Agustín Rosario
- Starring: Herbert Cruz; Ivonne Arriaga; Noris Joffre; Lizmarie Quintana; Abraham Martí (2006-2007); Ángel Figueroa; Edgardo "El Bebo" Adames; Carlos Ramírez
- Opening theme: "TV Ilegal Theme"
- Ending theme: "TV Ilegal Theme (Instrumental)"
- Country of origin: United States
- Original language: Spanish
- No. of seasons: 4

Production
- Executive producer: Agustín Rosario
- Production locations: Guaynabo, Puerto Rico
- Camera setup: Multi-camera
- Running time: 60 minutes (including commercials)

Original release
- Network: WAPA-TV
- Release: May 17, 2006 – May 13, 2009

Related
- Noche Ilegal (2012-2015); TV Ilegal: El Especial (2011); TV Ilegal: El Especial 2 (2012)

TV Ilegal, stylized as tv [i]lεgal, was a Puerto Rican comedy, parody and satire television show broadcast on WAPA-TV from 2006 to 2009. The show parodied both local and international shows and people such as local shows, telenovelas, variety shows and others. Most of the cast had previously worked on Sálvese Quien Pueda on Telemundo.

The show's cast featured comedians Herbert Cruz, Ivonne Arriaga, Noris Joffre, Lizmarie Quintana, Abraham Martí, Ángel Figueroa, Edgardo "El Bebo" Adames and Carlos Ramírez. In 2007, Abraham Martí left the show to pursue music and acting opportunities in Spain and abroad. On May 13, 2009, the show broadcast its last episode due to no advertisement revenue to pay the actors. After a week of cancellation, a few of the cast members moved the show's format to Cadena Salsoul in Radio Ilegal.

TV Ilegal aired two specials broadcast in Telemundo in November 2011 and early 2012, before returning to television to Univision Puerto Rico on October 1, 2012 on Noche Ilegal. Herbert Cruz, Lizmarie Quintana, Ivonne Arriaga, Abraham Martí and Ángel Figueroa returned as part of the cast, except for Noris Joffre, Carlos Ramirez and Edgardo "El Bebo" Adames. The show ended in 2015.

== TV show parodies ==
Parody	Original	Description
Noti-Jierro a las 10:00	Noticentro a las 10:00	It has been the most popular parody due to the parody of Pedro Rosa Nales, whose catchphrase ("¡Oye! ¡Eso 'ta bueno!") is also what made the parody very popular.
Caso Enterrado	Caso Cerrado	Portrays a parody of Dr. Ana María Polo with a very suggestive lesbian preference presiding the court and awarding the case to the defendant, which was usually a young, beautiful woman.
Ahora Podemos Gufiar	Ahora Podemos Hablar	Its host, Carmen Jodet, is often portrayed as a biased journalist who often questioned her guests if they were linked to Kobbo Santarrosa, with whom the real Carmen Jovet has had many feuds. Santarrosa's La Comay often criticized Jovet's ethics over her interviewing methods.
SuperExplosivo	SuperXclusivo	
El (Anti-)Show de Maripilly	Original sketch	Maripilly's talk show.
Sabado Picante	Sabado Gigante	
Que Mala Suerte con Marrano	Qué Suerte	
Prison de Castro Break	Prison Break	Introduced after the arrest of senator Jorge de Castro Font in 2008.
El Gran Caso De Aníbal	Original sketch	Aníbal Acevedo Vilá case on electronic fraud accusations.

== Parodies of famous people ==
A list of famous people (Puerto Rican, or International). These are the people that get their own skit, rather than appear "inside" main show parodies.

Parody	Original	Description
Maripilly	Maripily Rivera	Puerto Rican model and entrepreneur. She is portrayed as a disoriented model who never correctly remembers names and when corrected from a verbal error she replies: "También" ("That too").
Titi Luz	Ruth Fernández	She is portrayed wearing a boa made out of money, who casually approaches people in need of money. Supposedly, the original person took money from the House of the Artist fund, which was underway for construction.
Héctor Marrano	Hector Marcano	Host of Que Mala Suerte con Marrano.
Los Rayos Grama	Los Rayos Gamma	An ode to the original group, the parody also satirized current events.
Pedro Fosas Nasales	Pedro Rosa Nales	Co-anchor of Notijierro a las 10:00. The most popular parody for his catchphrase: "¡Oye! ¡Eso ta' bueno!".
Luz Melena Verde	Luz Nereida Vélez	Co-anchor of Notijierro a las 10:00 alongside Pedro Fosas Nasales. Portrayed as an unpleasant person who makes unfunny jokes.
Carmen Jodet	Carmen Jovet	Constantly whines about Kobbo Santarrosa's "supposed plot" to out-throw her from television and often accuses her guests of conspiring with Santarrosa.
Charrytín	Charytín	A very hyperactive woman who talks very rapidly like the original.
La Comadre	La Comay	Abraham Martí originally played La Comadre using his own face instead of a mask, while Herbert Cruz portrayed Héctor Atravieso (parodying Héctor Travieso). After Martí left, Cruz took over as La Comadre using a mask like the original, but unaccompanied by a sidekick.
Ana María Pollo "La Jueza"	Ana María Polo	Portrayed with a very suggestive lesbian preference.
Rubén Cháncez	Rubén Sánchez	Interviewed real life guests while using various unusual pens, a parody to the actual reporter's pen-pointing interviewing style.
De Castro	Jorge de Castro Font	Introduced after the senator was arrested in 2008.
Luis Flojuño	Luis Fortuño	Governor of Puerto Rico, 2009–2013
El Gobe Aníbal	Aníbal Acevedo Vilá	Governor of Puerto Rico, 2005–2009
Silita "La Gobe"	Sila María Calderón	First female Governor of Puerto Rico, 2001–2005
Luis Ra	Luis Raúl	Portrayed with a very big nose like Luis Raúl's.
Nicolás Coyeras and Sergio Santa Claus	Nicolás Nogueras and Sergio Peña Clos	Parodies of politic analysts who often appeared on Que Mala Suerte.

== Special guests ==
Special guests included local personalities, politicians, musical guests, among others.

- Luis Raúl - Confronted his counterpart in a competition to determine the real Luis Raúl.
- Víctor Alicea
- Milly Cangiano
- Aníbal Acevedo Vilá - Governor of Puerto Rico, 2005–2009
- Luis Fortuño - Governor of Puerto Rico, 2009–2013
- Jowell & Randy - Got called "Blower & Panty" by Maripilly.
- José Nogueras - Musical guest
- Rubén Sánchez - Special guest on the parody to one of his former shows
- Miguelito featuring Divino - Musical guests
- Miguel Cotto - Boxer and former OMB Welter Champion

== Writers ==
- Javier del Valle
- Agustín Rosario (Executive producer and artistic director)
- Edmee Rivera (General producer)
- Pedro Juan Ríos
- Carlos Ramírez

== Cancellation and aftermath ==
Facing insufficient advertisement revenue during their time slot to pay the cast, the show was ultimately cancelled in May 2009, with its final broadcast on May 13, 2009.

=== Radio spin-off ===
On May 21, 2009, producer Agustín Rosario took TV Ilegal to radio on Cadena Salsoul with a weekly radio show called Radio Ilegal, only a week from its television departure. Rosario hosted the radio show with actors Herbert Cruz, Noris Joffre, Lizmarie Quintana, and other talents that parody television and political people. The radio show kept the parody concept of local politicians and celebrities, with the "benefit that people can imagine them [the characters], because they have already seen it on television", according to Uno Radio Group Chain President, Luis "Tuto" Soto.

=== Television specials ===
In November 2011, TV Ilegal returned to television with a special broadcast in Telemundo; Noris Joffre, who worked in WAPA at the time, did not appear. A second television special was aired in 2012 on Telemundo, introducing new parodies such as Dando Manigueta (Dando Candela), the Gricel Mamery/Javier Ceriani exposure incident, José Ortiz "El Buen Samaritano", a clairvoyant claiming he spoke to the spirit of murdered child Lorenzo González Cacho; the Manny Manuel car accident and Dinga & Matraca (Minga & Petraca).

=== Return to TV ===
After more than three years, TV Ilegal returned to television to Univision Puerto Rico on October 1, 2012 as Noche Ilegal (stylized as NOCHE [i]LEGAL). Herbert Cruz, Lizmarie Quintana, Ivonne Arriaga and Ángel Figueroa reprised each of their parodies and introduced new ones as well; Abraham Martí was briefly part of the cast but left afterwards. Noris Joffre and Edgardo "El Bebo" Adames were the only two cast members from the original show to not return. Episodes ran for 30 minutes, including commercials, airing weekly nights, and were initially hosted by various local celebrities, politicians or artists, later permanently hosted by Gricel Mamery. Noche Illegal was the final show left in Univision Puerto Rico's local programming block after the network discontinued most of its local workshops including the morning, noon and afternoon newscast. The show was ultimately cancelled in 2015.
