= Eddie Miró =

Puerto Rican actor and comedian (1935–2024)

- Born: March 25, 1935; Humacao, Puerto Rico
- Died: October 9, 2024 (aged 89); Río Piedras, Puerto Rico
- Burial place: Morovis National Cemetery
- Education: Central High school University of Puerto Rico at Mayagüez (B.S.)
- Occupation: Television host
- Years active: 1964–2024
- Notable work: El Show de las 12
- Spouse: Juanita "Ita" Medina (m. 1965)
- Children: 3
- Awards: Gold Circle Emmy Award (NATAS, Suncoast Chapter, 2022)
- Website
- Military career
- Allegiance: United States
- Branch: United States Army
- Service years: 1958–1960
- Rank: Specialist

Eduardo Miró Castañeda (March 25, 1935 – October 9, 2024), better known as Eddie Miró, was a Puerto Rican television host. He was best known for hosting El Show de las 12, Telemundo Puerto Rico's variety show, for more than forty years. Miró began his career in entertainment as a singer, writer, and comedian. Miró was noted for his longevity in front of the cameras, often compared to Dick Clark in the United States. Throughout the run of El Show de las 12, he interacted with numerous entertainers, both local and international.

In Puerto Rico's competitive television market, Miró outlasted other hosts such as Luis Vigoreaux (who was murdered in 1983), his son Luisito Vigoreaux, and Yoyo Boing, who were all hosts of Televicentro's rival program El Show del Mediodía. He was named an Honorary Police Officer by the Puerto Rico Police. On June 13, 2022, Miró received a Gold Circle Emmy Award from the National Academy of Television Arts and Sciences (NATAS) Suncoast Chapter in recognition of his fifty-year career in Puerto Rican television.

== Early life and military career ==
Miró was born on March 25, 1935, and grew up in the Santurce area of San Juan. He also lived at Urbanización Roosevelt in Hato Rey. He graduated from Central High School in Santurce in 1953, where he was voted "most likely to succeed in entertainment." He later earned a Bachelor of Science degree in surveying and topography from the University of Puerto Rico at Mayagüez (RUM).

Miró was recruited into the United States Army, serving from 1958 to 1960 as a specialist in the Army Medical Corps. After completing his military service, he considered pursuing a career in medicine. He also served with the 1st Air Base Group, a unit of the Puerto Rico State Guard.

== Entertainment career ==
As a high schooler, Miró worked at Radio Río. While working there, Alicia Moreda introduced him to producer Tommy Muñiz, who contracted him to work at the headquarters of Producciones Tommy Muñiz during the summer. In 1954, Miró participated in a competition hosted by television show Capitán Colgate, tying with a routine that was completed with the help of Muñiz. While attending the RUM, he would make occasional appearances in television. Muñiz eventually created a program with Miró in mind, Lotus lo divierte, in which he introduced the band Charlie Miró y sus pájaros locos. The characters of Elpidio and Reguerete migrated to Garata deportiva where they represented the Criollos de Caguas and Cangrejeros de Santurce, while Rivera defended the Senadores de San Juan and Miró the Indios de Mayagüez. With the end of the baseball season, the show was reworked into El chiste camel, with the cast remaining the same.

His breakthrough came in 1964 when actor-turned-producer Paquito Cordero offered him the role of host for a new television program, El Show de las 12, on Telemundo Channel 2. The program first aired in January 1965. In the years that followed, Miró became a teen idol in Puerto Rico. Miró wrote the script for Paquito Cordero's El curandero del pueblo (1968) starring Adalberto Rodríguez. He incorporated comedy into his hosting, a style that earned him recognition from television critics. During the 1960s, 1970s, and 1980s, he expanded his career by hosting other programs produced by Cordero, including Noche de Gala, Salsa, Sabado en la Noche, and Adelante Juventud.

In 1989, El Show de las 12 introduced a gossip segment titled La Condesa del Bochinche ("The Countess of Gossip"), featuring professional ventriloquist Kobbo Santarrosa and his puppet character of the same name. The segment became the most-watched part of the program. Its popularity led to the character—later renamed La Comay—being given its own show on Telemundo, titled Xclusivo, with Miró as host. The program remained successful throughout the 1990s until Santarrosa moved to WAPA-TV in 1999. Although Santarrosa invited Miró to join him as co-host of the new program, SuperXclusivo, Miró declined out of loyalty to Telemundo and to Cordero.

Miró was one of the few Puerto Rican television personalities who worked almost exclusively for Telemundo throughout his career. He remained with the network until 2010, when he was hired by Puerto Rico TV to host El Show de Eddie Miró. In 2014, he joined WAPA America's El Tiempo Es Oro as a comedian in sketch segments.

== Personal life ==
Miró married choreographer Juanita "Ita" Medina on August 28, 1965, at the Los Angeles Church in Carolina, Puerto Rico. They had three daughters—Dana, Michelle, and Christie Miró Medina—who pursued careers in the entertainment industry as actresses, television hosts, and producers. In the 1990s, Dana married Luisito Vigoreaux, linking Miró to the family of his former competitor, Luis Vigoreaux.

=== Tax issues ===
In January 2005, shortly after celebrating forty years of El Show de las 12, Miró was informed that the program would not continue, partly due to changes in Telemundo Puerto Rico's production department. He later expressed frustration during a radio interview, criticizing the network's producer Tony Mojena. That same year, Miró and his wife were charged with tax evasion by the Puerto Rico Department of Treasury. In early 2008, he accepted a plea bargain, pleading guilty to a minor tax evasion charge and agreeing to pay his tax debt and fines.

=== Illness and death ===
In 2003, Miró was diagnosed with colon cancer. Despite his illness, he continued hosting El Show de las 12 without taking time off. Following his recovery, former First Lady of Puerto Rico Lila Mayoral Wirshing and retired Piratas de Quebradillas basketball player Raymond Dalmau became spokespersons for colon cancer testing and prevention in Puerto Rico.

In August 2024, Miró was hospitalized following a fall. He died on October 9, 2024, at the age of 89, after suffering from Bethlem myopathy, which had left him hospitalized since August. He was buried at the Morovis National Cemetery in Morovis, Puerto Rico.

On November 17, 2024, Miró was posthumously inducted into the Puerto Rico Veterans Hall of Fame.

== See also ==
- List of Puerto Ricans
