= Alexandra a las 12 =

Puerto Rican midday variety television series

- Title card for the show
- Also known as: Alexandra De Noche
- Genre: Variety Show
- Created by: Alexandra Fuentes
- Presented by: Alexandra Fuentes
- Country of origin: Puerto Rico
- Original language: Spanish

Production
- Camera setup: Multi-camera
- Running time: 30 Minutes (2014-2017); 60 Minutes (2017-2021); 90 Minutes (2021-present)
- Production company: WKAQ News Department

Original release
- Network: WKAQ-TV
- Release: January 13, 2014 – present

Related
- Telenoticias

Alexandra a las 12 (Alexandra at noon) is a Puerto Rican midday variety television series airing on WKAQ-TV and hosted by Alexandra Fuentes. Upon its debut in 2014 the show was known as Alexandra de noche (Alexandra at night) and aired as a late-night talk show before the station decided to move the show to the midday time-slot in 2017.

== History ==
=== Alexandra de noche ===
Originally known as Alexandra de noche (Alexandra at night) the show premiered on January 13, 2014, and aired weekdays at the 10:30 p.m. spot right after the nighttime edition of Telenoticias. The original version of Alexandra de noche followed the late-night talk show and had a half hour duration. During the show, Fuentes would open with a short monologue followed by an interview with a guest which would fill the rest of the program. The show debuted to moderate success for the station getting a ratings boost for the late-night spot and coming in second place behind WAPA-TV.

=== Telemundo de noche ===
In August 2016, it was announced that Alexandra Fuentes would be leaving the show to support her husband David Bernier as he ran for governor in the 2016 Puerto Rican general election. Fuentes' last show aired on Friday, September 2, 2016, and featured guests Raymond Arrieta, Silverio Pérez, Papo Brenes and WKAQ-TV president José Cancela.

After Fuentes' exit her last name was dropped from the show's title and the show became Telemundo de noche (Telemundo at night) and would feature a revolving door of guests hosts such as, Myraida Chaves, Daniela Droz and Alfonsina Molinari. During this period the show also began airing at 11:00 p.m. instead of 10:30 p.m.

After the results of the 2016 Puerto Rican general election ended in a loss for Bernier, Fuentes announced on November 16, 2016, that she would be returning to the show as soon as November 30, 2016.

=== Alexandra a las 12 ===
On December 19, 2016, WKAQ-TV announced that the show would be moving time-slots and would now become the station's new midday variety show, this would be the first time the station would have a midday show since the cancellation of El Show de las 12 in 2005. The new version of the show would now be called Alexandra a las 12 (Alexandra at noon) and would be expanded from a half hour to an hour to accommodate news segments, weather report segments and political analysis segments. The new format of the show would serve as an extension of the 11:00 a.m. broadcast of Telenoticias and would combine the previously mentioned elements of the newscasts with Fuentes' monologues, interviews and comedy segments. The first episode of Alexandra a las 12 aired on January 16, 2017.

On March 29, 2021, WKAQ announced that it would once again extend Alexandra a las 12 by adding a half hour to the show. The show would now start at 11:30 a.m. and would put it in direct competition with WAPA-TV's midday show Pegate al mediodia. The first episode of Alexandra at 11:30 a.m. aired on April 12, 2021.

On January 2, 2024, it was announced that the show would debut a new look. Among the changes announced by the station it would be a new studio and a new space for the sketch comedy portion of the show. The changes are set to go into effect when Fuentes' returns from her holiday vacation on January 8, 2024. The changes are being lauded as a "new season" for the program.

== On-air staff ==
- Alexandra Fuentes, host
- Ivonne Solla Cabrea, news anchor Telenoticias
- Carlos Díaz Olivo, political analysis
- Luis Pabón Roca, political analysis
- Herbert Cruz, comedian
- Victor Alicea, comedian
- Carmen Nydia Velázquez, comedian
- Eyra Agüero, comedian
