= Anda Pa'l Cará =

Late-night talk and variety show from Puerto Rico

- Starring: Silverio Pérez; Luis Raúl; Gricel Mamery; Daniel Sarcos; Gricel Mamery; Sonya Cortés; Rafael José; Gricel Mamery; Alexandra Fuentes; Rony Campos The Hyper; Hector Marcano; Javier de Jesús; Alí Warrington
- Country of origin: Puerto Rico

Production
- Producers: Diana Matos; Beatriz Oliveros
- Running time: 60 minutes

Original release
- Network: WLII-DT
- Release: 2000 – 2009

Anda Pa'l Cará was a Spanish-language television program, a late-night talk and variety show from Puerto Rico. It started in 2000 on Tele Once as a late night show with comedian Silverio Pérez as host, and later evolved into a more youth-oriented format with a focus on celebrity news and interviews.

The show usually featured interviews with artists and other personalities, music performances, celebrity news, curious facts, and comedy sketches, among other things. Aside of its regular hosts, the show featured a team of collaborators discussing opinions on a wide range of topics from sexuality, films, and the Internet.

Despite its hosting changes, the show remained one of the most successful in the island, edging its direct rival, No te Duermas, of Telemundo.

== Show history ==
=== 2000: Silverio Pérez ===
In 2000, Anda Pa'l Cara began, with Silverio Pérez as host. During this first year, Pérez focused more on a late night talk show format with a slight focus on political commentary. During this time the show counted with Gabriel Ferri as creative director.

=== 2001-2003: Luis Raúl and Gricel Mamery ===
When Pérez left the show, most people thought its popularity would decline. However, the combination of new hosts - comedian Luis Raúl and Gricel Mamery - and their chemistry, kept the show alive on the charts.

During their run, the show changed its format to one more oriented to comedy sketches benefitting from Luis Raúl talent. He brought most of his well-known characters, and several new ones, to the show, infusing it with a lighter format.

=== 2003-2005: Luis Raúl leaves ===
Again, when Luis Raúl left the show in 2003, many thought that audiences would reject the change. A long casting process ensued, and Venezuelan host Daniel Sarcos was picked to join Mamery. Known Puerto Rican host, Sonya Cortes, was also chosen to complete the trio of hosts. This decision angered many local celebrities, who argued the election of a foreign host over a Puerto Rican one. However, after a few months, legal problems concerning Sarcos visa didn't allow him to continue working, and Puerto Rican Rafael José was chosen to replace him.

José mostly kept the previous format intact doing comedy sketches, albeit with a slight turn into a more celebrity oriented show. Most audiences embraced the selection and the show kept performing well. José would remain in the show until 2006 when he left to work in the United States. The year before, Mamery had also left the show.

=== 2006-2009: Youngest vision, Rony, Sonya and Alexandra ===
In 2005, when Mamery left the show, she was replaced by young host Alexandra Fuentes. Fuentes used to play a parody of Mamery in the show Salvese Quien Pueda on WKAQ-TV. The following year, radio host, Rony the Hyper joined the cast in a transition move before José left the show. This season was the most successful of the show's history. and was produced by: Soraya Sanchez- Executive Producer, Nelson Ruiz- Executive Producer, Diana Matos- General Producer, Michell Santiago-Associate Producer/ General Producer ( Covers the General Producer when she's absent), Orlando Sanchez- Line Producer/ Associate Producer ( Covers the associate producers when she's absent), Beatriz Oliveros- Producer, Yamilin Rivera- Guest Producer, Angel Mercado- Creative Producer, Karoll Nieves- Exterior Producer, Lisette Letriz- Editor Producer, Javier Maldonado- Editor Producer, Yesibel Perez- Producer, Joselo Perez - Media Producer, Maria Ramos- Production Assistance, Alexis Gonzales - Production Assistance, Mary Luz Cintron- Production Assistance.

During this recent run, the show has focused more on its celebrity section featuring more interviews to several celebrities and personalities. The sections of movies and sexuality have been given a more ample coverage as well. In 2008, known celebrity reporter Milly Cangiano was added to the team to collaborate with Ramón "Papo" Brenes, who had been working in the show since 2000.

=== 2009: Alexandra and Sonya, Looking for a new host ===
Following the departure of Rony "The Hyper" due to personal reasons, hosts Alexandra Fuentes and Sonya Cortés began a series of auditions to select a new co-host for Anda Pa'l Cara. However, on December 28, 2009, Univision Puerto Rico announced the cancellation of the program. The show concluded on December 30, 2009, ending a ten-year run.

The final season was produced by the following staff:

- Executive Producer: Soraya Sanchez
- General Producer: Maxi Paglia
- Associate Producers: Michell Santiago, Orlando Sanchez, Yesibel Perez
- Line Producer: Orlando Sanchez
- Editor Producers: Karoll Nieves, Alexis Gonzales
- Media Producer: Joselo Perez
- Producers: Yesibel Perez
- Production Assistants: Rafael Perez, Maria Ramos, Alexis Gonzales

== Co-Scheduling Anda Pal Cara ==
APC de Gala

The program presents a more serious focus than APC, with Alexandra conducting interviews that explore an artist’s background in depth. The format examines early life, including childhood experiences, as well as key moments in the artist’s career, while offering insights into their personal and professional journey.

APC Se Chavó La Política

This initiative combines comedy with policy analysis in the context of the November 4 elections. Ir provides a platform to examine candidates for various political offices and to discuss issues affecting Puerto Ricans, using a format that incorporates elements of political satire.

== Hosts ==
Official hosts

- Silverio Pérez (2000)
- Luis Raúl and Gricel Mamery (2001–2003)
- Daniel Sarcos, Gricel Mamery and Sonya Cortés (2003)
- Rafael José, Gricel Mamery and Sonya Cortés (2004–2005)
- Rafael José, Alexandra Fuentes and Sonya Cortés (2005–2006)
- Rony, Alexandra Fuentes and Sonya Cortés (2006–2009)
- Alexandra Fuentes and Sonya Cortés (2009)
- Hector Marcano and Alexandra Fuentes (2009)
- Javier de Jesús, Alexandra Fuentes and Alí Warrington (2009)

Co-hosts (Collaborators)

- Félix Vélez (2000–2005)
- Lorell "Lucia" Crespo (2000–2009)
- Alexandra Malagon (Anda Pa'l Cara de Gala's host) (2007–2009)
- Glory Glou (2008–2009)
- Ramón "Papo" Brenes (2000–2009)
- Juanma Fernández Paris (2000–2009)
- Carmita Laboy (Sexologist) (2006–2009)
- Tita "La Tonya" Guerrero (2007–2009)
- Milly Cangiano (2008–2009)
- Harold Rosario (2009)
- Saudy Rivera (2009)
- David Benitez (2009)
- William Venegas (2009)
- Miguel Morales (2009)
- Linette Chico (2009)

== See also ==
- WLII
- Univision Puerto Rico
- Galavision
