= Gilbert Mamery =

Puerto Rican broadcaster (1927–2003)

Gilbert Mamery Riera (March 15, 1927 – March 30, 2003) was a Puerto Rican disc-jockey, musicologist, radio station owner, radio and television personality, marketing impresario and composer born in Mayagüez, Puerto Rico. He is the father of the late Puerto Rican talent manager and radio entrepreneur Topy Mamery, Puerto Rican radio announcer and marketing impresario Eric William Mamery, and media announcer and comedian Gricel Mamery. He was also the son of Lebanese-born textile impresario William Mamary (the family name's spelling was later changed during Gilbert's lifetime).

== Early years ==
Gilbert Mamery was born to a well-to-do family in Mayagüez, Puerto Rico. His father William was a Lebanese immigrant to the United States who, after moving to Philadelphia and serving in World War I decided to join a sizeable group of Maronite Christian Lebanese immigrants who moved from the States to Puerto Rico in the early years of the 20th century. He established a handkerchief and lace products factory (and ran a numbers game operation as a side occupation), and became a successful businessman. His factory and name became cultural references (in a somewhat unflattering way) in the plena "Aló, ¿Quién Ñama?" by Mon Rivera. Referring to the plena, it is said that Mamary used to agree with the saying that "bad publicity is better than no publicity at all".

Gilbert did not want to follow on the family business since, from an early age, he was obsessed with popular music. A live presentation by Carlos Gardel in Mayagüez's Teatro Yagüez (on 9 April 1935) was a defining moment in his life. He initiated his large collection of music recordings and items soon after.

Since he was tall for his age (and had a booming bass voice, which was the deepest one of any local radio personality at the time he became a broadcaster), Gilbert could sneak in clubs at an age as early as thirteen years-old, which allowed him to visit relatives in New York City and sneak into live presentations by Tommy Dorsey and Xavier Cugat (who caught him playing bongo drums onstage with the band unsupervised once, and later became a friend).

At the age of fourteen, Gilbert pleaded for a job as a disc-jockey at the city's first radio station, WPRA-AM. The station owners were reluctant to give him a job due to his age, but conceded due to his sheer persistence.

Gilbert would later make solo trips to Cuba at the age of sixteen (1943), in search of local acts such as the Orquesta Casino de la Playa and Miguelito Valdés. In his first trip he visited the studios of CMQ, Cuba's main radio station. Soon after his Cuba trip, Mamery joined WKJB-AM in Mayagüez, where he would host three radio shows a day. Taking a cue from his Cuban trip, Gilbert tried using two turntables simultaneously (one playing the music currently being aired, while cueing another record at the same time), something unheard of in Puerto Rico at the time. This gained him the nickname "El Loco de Los Controles" ("The Control Room Looney") by his fellow DJ's, and the technique, plus his expansive interest as a collectionist, earned him a reputation for efficiency at his broadcasts.

Gilbert became a cultural reference himself in another plena, Daniel Santos' version of "La Máquina" ("The Engine"), a song about the existing train route between San Juan and Ponce (for which Mayagüez was the midway point) in the lines: "Mamery le puso un disco/Y la máquina bailó" ("Mamery played a record, and the engine danced").

== Marketing genius ==
By 1950, and already married for the first time, Gilbert wanted to own a radio station, but his limited financial resources made this all but impossible. He persuaded four wealthy businessmen in town to back him up in the purchase of an ailing radio station, which he renamed WTIL-AM, or Radio Útil ("útil" meaning "useful" in Spanish, and a pun based on the station's call letters). He eventually bought the other investors' share in the station and became the sole owner.

At the same time, Gilbert positioned his radio station as the primary marketing vehicle for promoting shows at local theaters (the Riera, Yagüez and San José theaters in town). Some of these shows were merely showings of Spanish and Mexican musical films, which were major attendance draws at the time; other were live act shows which Gilbert first announced, and later became a promoter of. Gilbert would do partial live airings of the first show of any show run (first via telephone line, which was unheard of at the time, then using remote equipment), verbally describing the movie if a film was being shown. These partial airings would almost guarantee sell out crowds for the other performances. Gilbert would also be a pioneer of radio contests and giveaways in Puerto Rico.

Due to his success as a promoter, Gilbert would be the primary concert promoter in western Puerto Rico. He made a barter agreement with Prinair, the local commuter airline, as to bring acts to the city that would not otherwise be shown there, in exchange for advertising the airline. The most notable of these performers was Raphael, who stayed at Gilbert's home while in Mayagüez, while the house was mobbed by screaming fans who even climbed to the roof to get a glimpse of their idol).

Gilbert also composed a few boleros, most famous of which is "Fracaso" ("Failure", a.k.a. "Qué Poco Duró", or "How Little Did It Last").

== Later years ==
Gilbert started "La Discoteca del Recuerdo", a syndicated radio program, in 1961. The program aired on weekdays, and originated first from WTIL-AM's studios, and later from Gilbert's home studio in Mayagüez. (Individual broadcasts would be rerun previously recorded at different times in different stations, but the daily airings would be done live at 5:00 pm, AST). He claimed to never have canceled an original broadcast, never miss an air date and never substitute a live broadcast by a rerun—save because of technical reasons—during the program's 42-year run.

After the death of William Mamary in 1965 the family negotiated an exchange with the builders of the Radio Centro building in Mayagüez, in which the builders would purchase the lot where the former textile factory sat, but gave Gilbert and his family the ownership of the new 12-story building's penthouse. He moved WTIL-AM and his media publicity firm, Mamery Publicidad, to the new facility, and eventually gave control of day-to-day operations to his children.

In the early 1970s Gilbert developed polyps in his vocal cords. These were operated upon, and because of this he lost the lower ranges of his legendary bass voice. This forced him to speak about an octave higher, with a raspy tone. Believing he had ruined his livelihood by this, he faced a lasting bout with clinical depression which lasted, on and off, until his death. In reality, Mamery was most productive and his popularity as a cultural icon in Puerto Rico was at its highest during the time his voice was affected. He claimed that music and religion (he became a devout Roman Catholic during his ordeal) saved his mental health at the time.

Gilbert was a major television personality within the small western Puerto Rico media market. In the late 1970s and early 1980s he expanded his reach to the rest of the country by hosting nostalgia shows, in which he'd play videos and short films by Puerto Rican and American artists (and, inevitably, one by Carlos Gardel in every broadcast). These broadcasts became very popular in Puerto Rico. He was also involved in three Puerto Rico-wide radio shows by the time of his death.

== Extreme music collector ==
A media conglomerate offered to buy WTIL-AM from Gilbert in 2002. To the surprise of many, Gilbert sold the station, not before ensuring a reserved spot in its programming to continue broadcasting "La Discoteca del Recuerdo" from his home studio.

Gilbert Mamery was one of the primary experts on the life of legendary tango singer Carlos Gardel, as well as an avid music recording, video recording, film and magazine collector. His holdings surpassed the thousands of items. He was regularly an advisor for numerous documentaries produced in Puerto Rico and abroad, particularly those about Gardel, as well as two of the Banco Popular de Puerto Rico yearly Christmas television specials.

== Death and legacy ==
A lifetime of smoking had Gilbert develop emphysema, which only slowed his output, although he would complain about respiratory distress in his last days. On the early morning of March 30, 2003, Gilbert woke up at 3:00 am (AST) in his Mayagüez home, apparently showing no symptoms of poor health at the time. He returned to his bed, and died of a heart attack while sleeping, probably one or two hours later. The crowd that attended his funeral, one of the largest ever assembled in Mayagüez for a funeral, was comparable in size to those attending the respective funerals of Benjamin Cole, Mon Rivera and Frankie Ruiz.

Besides leaving behind an enormous multimedia collection and a clan with strong ties to Puerto Rico's media industry, Gilbert Mamery has shaped the career of various performers. José Feliciano, for example, has gone on record saying that he recorded his instrumental album, "Six-String Lady", as a suggestion from Mamery.

Gilbert Mamery had strict standards for broadcast and live act production and promotion. His approach to production was compared during his lifetime to that of Bill Graham in the United States. For example, in those productions for which he collaborated, he would refuse to be credited if the end product turned out not to be historically accurate. His children and widow (Elba Muñoz), as managers of his estate, had strict orders from Gilbert not to donate his enormous multimedia collection to any entity which might not make good use of it with appropriate resources and funding, something which guarantees that the collections remain in private hands, at least as of the time of writing (June 2007).

== See also ==
- List of Puerto Ricans
