= Luis Raúl =

Puerto Rican actor and comedian (1962–2014)

- Luis Raúl in his final stand-up comedy show on September 14, 2013, at the José Miguel Agrelot Coliseum
- Born: Luis Raúl Martínez Rodríguez; March 6, 1962; Ponce, Puerto Rico
- Died: February 2, 2014 (aged 51); San Juan, Puerto Rico
- Education: • Dr. Pila High School • Universidad del Sagrado Corazón (BA) • Ofelia D'Acosta's School of Dramatic Arts
- Notable work: ¿Que Es Lo Que Pasa Aquí? Ahh! En Casa de Luis Raúl; Anda Pa'l Cará; Que OJOnes
- Parent(s): Raúl Martínez; Nilda Rodríguez

Comedy career
- Years active: 1983–2014
- Medium: Television, stand-up, film
- Genres: Observational comedy; Character comedy
- Subjects: Current events; modern life in Puerto Rico; popular culture; Puerto Rican culture; self-deprecation; sex

Luis Raúl Martínez Rodríguez (March 6, 1962 – February 2, 2014), better known as Luis Raúl, was a Puerto Rican actor, comedian and television host. He was known for his stand-up comedy and his various characters. He also hosted TeleOnce's talk and variety show Anda Pa'l Cará from 2001 to 2003 and Telemundo Puerto Rico's game show Pa' Que Te Lo Goces in 2006. He died early in the morning of February 2, 2014, from kidney failure which in turn led to cardiac and respiratory arrest.

== Life and career ==
=== Early years and education ===
Luis Raúl was born in the city of Ponce, Puerto Rico to Raúl Martínez and Nilda Rodríguez. As a young child, he showed interest in acting. During school, he would frequently participate in plays and shows. After graduating from Dr. Pila High School, he enrolled at the University of Puerto Rico at Mayagüez to study chemical engineering. After two years, he transferred to Universidad del Sagrado Corazón and majored in business administration, taking electives in theatre. In 1980, he graduated from Ofelia D'Acosta's School of Dramatic Arts.

=== Early career: 1981–1997 ===
In 1981, he moved to San Juan where he held several jobs to make ends meet. Among them, he worked by selling popcorn and hot dogs in two theaters. In the meantime, he studied at Ofelia D'Acosta's School of Dramatic Arts and started performing at weekly shows. In 1983, he debuted in the play Los Títeres de Cachiporra. In 1985, he had his first starring role in Un Mismo Corazón (One Heart), a play that dealt with the subject of AIDS, something that was taboo at the time.

At the same time, he started appearing in several local telenovelas and other TV shows. In 1987, he joined actor Edwin Pabellón in producing the radio show Algo Mejor. He also had sporadic appearances at the show En Serio con Silverio hosted by Silverio Pérez. After that, Perez recruited him for a new show called ¿Que Es Lo Que Pasa Aquí? Ahh!, a show dedicated to political and social satire. It was this show that established Luis Raúl as a comedic figure.

In 1992, Luis Raúl retired from the program with the intention of moving to Los Angeles and seek success there. In Los Angeles, he performed at several Hispanic commercials and shows, and also participated in various stand-up comedy and improvisation shows. However, he traveled to Puerto Rico constantly to perform his stand-up comedy show successfully around the island. In 1997, he also had his own show titled Pa' la Cama con Luis Raúl produced by Luisito Vigoreaux.

=== TV and stage return: 2000–2012 ===
In 2000, he officially established himself back in Puerto Rico and started another show called En Casa de Luis Raúl in Televicentro. In 2001, he was hired by Univision to replace long-time friend Silverio Pérez as host of the popular late night show Anda Pa'l Cará upon Perez's departure; he hosted the show with Gricel Mamery until 2003.

In 2008, Luis Raúl kicked off a farewell tour called "Chiquito Pero Juguetón" with the intention of retiring afterward. The tour was highly successful in Puerto Rico and one of the venues where the show was taped was released as a film in theatres in the island titled "Chiquito Pero Juguetón: Da Muvi". After a brief hiatus, he returned in 2009 with another tour titled "La Cosa Está Peúla 3D". In 2010, he started a new tour called "Con Los Huevos a Peseta". He embarked on another stand-up comedy in 2011 called "Que Clase 'E Lengua". On March 5, 2012, he had a special program called "El Camino" on Telemundo, which he co-hosted with Maritza Baigés. His penultimate stand-up comedy was titled "A Cuero Pela'o" and ran from Autumn 2012 to Spring 2013.

=== Final show and posthumous film: 2013–2014 ===
His final stand-up comedy show was a one night only performance titled "Que OJOnes" at Puerto Rico's renowned José Miguel Agrelot Coliseum, where Luis Raúl became the first comedian to perform at the venue on September 14, 2013, and the first show to be broadcast live from the venue over the internet. This performance marked the final show he performed before his death.

One of Luis Raúl's final wishes as a stand-up comedian, was to use the footage recorded from "Que OJOnes" and turn it into a film. On March 23, 2014, the film plans were confirmed undergoing post-production at the time. On May 5, 2014, the posthumous film was given a theatrical release for June 5, 2014, in Puerto Rico and select theaters in the United States at a later date, marking Luis Raúl's final film.

== Death ==
On January 13, 2014, Martínez was hospitalized after suffering bilateral pneumonia. Two weeks later, his condition worsened and he was placed on a ventilator that provided artificial respiration. However, aggravated by pre-existing conditions of diabetes and hypertension, his condition progressively worsened and his left lung was severely damaged. Consequently, he suffered from kidney failure, which in turn led to cardiac and respiratory arrest, dying early in the morning of February 2, 2014. Several of his colleagues expressed their condolences shortly after the news was made public. As per final wishes, Luis Raúl's family had his body directly cremated instead of holding a vigil. Prior to falling ill, Martínez had filmed scenes in a supporting role for the Dominican film Un lío en dólares; his character was recast after his death.

== Artificial intelligence revival ==
On May 27, 2026, José "Pepe" Dueño, a long-time friend, collaborator and producer of Luis Raúl's stand-up shows, announced the "resurrection" of the comedian via artificial intelligence. The stand-up comedy production, titled Estoy Vivo Kbr*ne$!! (stylized to read ¡estoy vivo cabrones!, which is a literal translation of "I'm alive, fuckers!"), was staged August 7–9, 2026 at the Luis A. Ferré Performing Arts Center, written by Silverio Pérez, also a long-time friend of Luis Raúl, featuring Pérez, Dueño, Tita Guerrero, Herbert Cruz, Giselle Ortiz and Gil René, who directed. The production was reported to have been in plans with Dueño's event production company over the course of three years and was approved and supported of the late comedian's family. A video announcement for the production, published through social accounts of Dueño's company, featuring an artificial intelligence-generated deepfake image, likeness and voice of Luis Raúl, was immediately met with high criticism and opposition through social media. Many have called out Dueño and those involved in the project out of respect of the late comedian.

The production is currently touring, with stops at the Centro de Bellas Artes de Caguas, the Complejo Ferial de Puerto Rico in Luis Raúl's hometown of Ponce, both in November 2026, and at the Dr. Phillips Center for the Performing Arts in Orlando in February 2027.

== Characters ==
Aside from stand-up comedy, Luis Raúl also popularized six characters that he often portrayed on television and occasionally in his stand-ups:

- Piquito: a naive kid with a speech impairment who makes a living selling barbecue chicken. Though Piquito tried selling other products, he always ended up back to selling barbecue chicken, where he was happy to be at.
- Tito Párpados: an Argentinian celebrity and media reporter with a flamboyant hairdo.
- El Bebé: a loving baby during the day but a perverted rascal at night.
- Malín: Luis Raúl's nuyorican cousin who constantly claims she performs "Off-off-off-off-Broadway... almost in Queens".
- Doña Mary Jane: an elderly pot-head woman; her name is a reference to one of the slang terms for marijuana.
- Junito Puppy Love: a flirting Don Juan who spends his time calling one of his many girlfriends and expressing his love with certain puns.

== Stand-up shows ==
Year	Title	Notes
1996	Luis Raúl Está Que Pica	
1996	Todavía Me Queda Cuerito	
1998	Tengo Arena Hasta En El Cuello	
1998	Ensarta'o En La Vara	
1999	El Encontronazo De Fin De Siglo	With Silverio Pérez
1999	A Que Me La Hago En Navidad	
2003	20 Años Y Sigue... Para'o	Celebrating 20 years of his stand-up career
2004	Lo Tengo Largo y Me Gusta	
2005	Lo Tengo Largo y Me Lo Voy a Cortar	
2005	Me Pasaron Por La Piedra	
2006	Sóplame Este Velón	
2007	El Bello y La Bestia	With Raymond Arrieta
2008	Chiquito Pero Juguetón	
2009	La Cosa Está Pelúa 3D	
2010	Con Los Huevos a Peseta	
2011	Que Clase 'E Lengua	
2012	A Cuero Pela'o	
2013	Que OJOnes	Celebrating 30 years of his stand-up career; final official show

== Filmography ==
Film
Year	Film	Role	Notes
1995	The Perez Family	News photographer	
2000	Café Mambo	Gilberto	
2000	Boys Life 3	Autograph seeker	"Inside Out" segment
2006	East Side Story	Salvador	
2008	Chiquito Pero Juguetón: Da Muvi	Himself and various	Stand-up comedy film
2012	Broche de Oro	Norberto	
2013	200 Cartas	Pedro	Final acting role
2014	Que OJOnes	Himself	Posthumous stand-up comedy film; final film role
Television
Year	Title	Role	Notes
1988	En Serio con Silverio	Various	Few episodes
1989	¿Que Es Lo Que Pasa Aquí? Ahh!	Various	Recurring appearances
1997	Pa' la Cama con Luis Raúl	Himself	Host; variety show and TV lead debut
2000	En Casa de Luis Raúl	Himself	Host; variety show
2001–2005	Anda Pa'l Cará	Himself	Host
2006	Pa' Que Te Lo Goces	Himself	Host
2006	Vanished	Gregorio Rey	
2008	TV Ilegal	Himself	Guest
2009–2013	Día a Día	Himself	Guest co-host; various episodes
2012	El Reguero de Luis Raúl	Himself	Variety show
2012–2013	Noche Ilegal	Himself	Guest host; 2 episodes
Theater		Himself	
Year	Title	Role	Notes
1983	Los Títeres de Cachiporra		
1985	Un Mismo Corazón		First starring role
1986	El Patito Feo	El Patito Feo	

== See also ==
- List of Puerto Ricans
- List of game show hosts
