= Broche de Oro =

2012 film directed by Raúl Marchand Sánchez

- Directed by: Raúl Marchand Sánchez
- Written by: Raúl Marchand Sánchez
- Produced by: Frances Lausell
- Starring: Jacobo Morales; Adrián García; Diego de la Texera; Luis Omar O'Farrill; Marian Pabón; Luis Raúl
- Cinematography: Sonnel Velázquez
- Edited by: Raúl Marchand Sánchez
- Music by: Gerónimo Mercado
- Production companies: • Do More Productions • Puerto Rico Film Corporation
- Distributed by: Puerto Rico Film Corporation
- Release date: September 13, 2012
- Running time: 90 minutes
- Country: Puerto Rico
- Language: Spanish
- Budget: $535,000

Broche de Oro is a 2012 Puerto Rican comedy film directed by Raúl Marchand Sánchez, starring Jacobo Morales, Adrián García, Diego de la Texera and Luis Omar O'Farrill. The film became the highest-grossing Puerto Rican film of 2012 and of all time. The film also holds the record for the longest theatrical run for a Puerto Rican film, with an 8-month run.

== Plot ==
Carlos (Luis Omar O'Farrill) is an aspiring surfer, whose father, Alberto (Carlos Esteban Fonseca), disapproves of his passion. They both visit Alberto's father, Rafael (Jacobo Morales), at the Catholic retirement home where he lives in. Carlos is left with his grandfather and friends Pablo (Diego de la Texera) and Anselmo (Adrián García), whom Pablo nicknames "Elmo". Alberto later picks up Carlos and abruptly breaks the news to Rafael of their move to Orlando for his job, leaving Rafael speechless. After leaving the retirement home and realizing what little time he has before he moves, Carlos calls Rafael later that night to invite him and his elder friends to a road trip to Loíza for a surfing competition and for Rafael to show him the family land. Early the next morning, the elders manage to sneak out of the retirement home through the kitchen and head out with Carlos driving his father's car. After realizing their absence, the Madre Superiora of the retirement home (Marian Pabón) recurs to the help of Noberto (Luis Raúl), the home's security guard, to find the elders and bring them back.

Meanwhile, arriving at the Medina family's land, Rafael shows Carlos the tree where the ashes of his wife are buried and leave afterwards for lunch at a nearby restaurant run by Margarita (Carmen Nydia Velázquez), a single mother whom Rafael helped her give birth before he retired from medicine, and her adult son Julio (Michael Stuart). Margarita develops a crush towards Anselmo, to which he does not reciprocate at first. Carlos, Rafael, Anselmo and Pablo head to Aviones Beach for the surfing competition, where Carlos meets Manolo (Willie Carrasco), another competitor, his girlfriend, Sofía (Maria Coral Otero Soto), and her friend, Wanda (Odalis Carela). Having placed second, Carlos and the elders leave for a nearby bar run by Coco Galore (Sara Pastor), a French former porn actress and Pablo's film partner in such films, whose stage name was Chi-Chi Le Grand. Sofía and Wanda join Carlos at the bar where Manolo interrupts her and leaves the establishment angrily after punching Carlos and later puncturing the tires of Alberto's car.

Already packing up for Orlando, Alberto desperately calls Carlos but is answered by Rafael to which he tells he will pick up the car the next day while Carlos and the elders stay the night at Coco's. Later that night, Coco throws a party to which Carlos, Rafael, Anselmo, Pablo, Sofía, Wanda and Margarita join. Meanwhile, the Madre Superiora and Norberto experience what appears to be alien activity calling out his name and ends up on the car's roof claiming "it was all so fast". Rafael is later found collapsed inside Coco's guest room by his grandson and helps him recover; Rafael confesses he's dealing with an illness but does not reveal which one.

The last day of the competition arrives and the Madre Superiora and Roberto finally found where the elders have been staying, after seeing Anselmo outside on the street. As the competition starts, the Madre Superiora and Norberto finally catch the elders at the beach but the nun admires the surfing and reveals she used to surf when she was younger. Carlos wins first place and an infuriated Manolo pushes him, creating a commotion to which Rafael tries to defend his grandson but Manolo pushes him down on the sand and begins to have health complications. He is immediately rushed to the hospital with the help from Carlos, the Madre Superiora, Roberto, Alberto and a changed-of-heart Manolo. Alberto reconciles with his father after being so harsh on him and both have a heartfelt father-and-son moment in the hospital.

After being released, Rafael returns to the retirement home. Anselmo marries Margarita and Pablo marries Coco in a double wedding with all their friends and family including Rafael, Carlos, Sofía and Julio, who cries over his mother's marriage. Some time after the wedding, Rafael passes away, and his ashes are buried besides his wife's under the tree in the Medina family land in Loíza.

In a mid-credits scene, an off-camera elder tries to sneak out the retirement home but the Madre Superiora and Norberto confront the elder from escaping.

== Cast ==
- Jacobo Morales as Rafael Medina, a retired doctor, living in a Catholic retirement home. He is the father of Alberto and the grandfather of Carlos.
- Adrián García as Anselmo Rodríguez, a hypochondriac elder who also looks at the possible negative outcomes of situations. He is nicknamed "Elmo" by Pablo, to which Anselmo repeatedly hates. He is initially repulsed by Margarita's strongly affections towards him, but later falls in love with her and marries her.
- Diego de la Texera as Pablo Díaz, a gigolo elder and former porn star, famous in France, whose stage name was Chi-Chi Le Grand. He marries his film partner towards the end of the film.
- Luis Omar O'Farrill as Carlos Medina, an aspiring surfer, son of Alberto and grandson of Rafael. He later develops a relationship with Sofía.
- Marian Pabón as Madre Superiora, the strict superior mother of the Catholic retirement home, where Rafael, Anselmo and Pablo live.
- Luis Raúl as Norberto, the retirement home's clumsy security guard.
- Carlos Esteban Fonseca as Alberto Medina, father of Carlos and son of Rafael. Alberto has had a difficult relationship with his father but later apologizes to him for being so hard on him.
- Maria Coral Otero Soto as Sofía, Manolo's girlfriend. At first she develops an interest in Carlos, while with Manolo, and dumps the latter afterwards.
- Carmen Nydia Velázquez as Margarita, a single mother and owner of the restaurant where Carlos and the elders have lunch at. She develops a crush after meeting Anselmo and eventually marries him.
- Michael Stuart as Julio, Margarita's son and cook at his mother's restaurant.
- Sara Pastor as Coco Galore, French former porn star, with whom she starred alongside Pablo in over twenty seven films. She is the owner of Coco's Splash, a bar nearby Aviones Beach in Loíza.
- Willie Carrasco as Manolo, Sofía's boyfriend and surfer who meets Carlos on the first day of the surfing competition. Manolo is dumped by Sofía after starting a fight against Carlos.
- Odalis Carela as Wanda, Sofía's friend.

== Prequel film ==
A prequel to the film, titled Broche de Oro: Comienzos, was released on September 14, 2017. Although in theaters for four days, before the hit of Hurricane Maria on September 19, 2017, the film slowly continued its screenings throughout Puerto Rico ten days after the natural phenomenon. It was re-released on January 25, 2018 and dedicated to comedian Shorty Castro, who has a role in the prequel, and died four days prior to the re-release. The film focuses on the beginning and development of Rafael, Pablo and Anselmo's friendship at the elderly home, with Charytín Goyco, Georgina Borri and Noelia Crespo joining the cast as three elder women in the same home, and Cordelia González also starring.

== Stage sequel ==
In July 2019, a stage musical sequel, Broche de Oro: El Musical, was announced for November 2–3, 2019 at the Luis A. Ferré Performing Arts Center with the main cast of the film reprising their roles including Jacobo Morales, Adrián García, Diego de la Texera, Luis Omar O'Farrill, Sara Pastor, Marian Pabón and Carmen Nydia Velázquez, with Charytín Goyco reprising her role from the prequel film, and Julio Ramos and Víctor Alicea in supporting roles. The musical, directed by Gil René, centers around Carlos and his children, played by Adrián Bernier Fuentes (son of David Bernier and Alexandra Fuentes) and Isabel Plaz.

== See also ==
- Cinema of Puerto Rico
- List of films set in Puerto Rico
