= Operación Chef =

Puerto Rican cooking show

- Starring: Francisco Zamora (Host); Layza Torres (Host); Enrique Piñeiro (2006-2009); Moisés Izquierdo (2009-2011); Yasiel Rodríguez; Cynthia Negrón; Edgardo Noel Rivera; Raquel Díaz; Guillermo González
- Country of origin: Puerto Rico

Production
- Executive producer: Francisco Zamora
- Running time: 30 minutes

Original release
- Network: Telemundo Puerto Rico
- Release: 2006 – present

Operación Chef is a Puerto Rican cooking show that airs on Telemundo Puerto Rico. The show started as a reality competition with several cooks competing for a top spot, with the winner receiving a contract for a cooking show in the channel.

The first winner of Operación Chef was Chef Enrique Piñeiro, who ended up hosting the show for three years afterward. After quitting in 2009, the producers made a second competition which was won by Chef Moisés Izquierdo. Chef Izquierdo hosted the show for little more than a year. In 2011, the producers announced they weren't renewing his contract.

The most recent installment of the show features five chefs offering their takes on different areas of cuisine throughout the week.

== History ==
=== Operación Chef (2006) ===
The first competition of Operación Chef started in 2006 and lasted several weeks. Chef Enrique Piñeiro was chosen as the winner.

=== Chef Piñeiro (2006-2009) ===
After winning the first competition of Operación Chef in 2006, Chef Enrique Piñeiro hosted the show until 2009. During his tenure, he popularized the use of basil, which was one of his favorite herbs. The show proved to be a success staying among the first two positions in the ratings on its time slot, during most of the years it was on air.

After three years, Piñeiro and producer Francisco Zamora couldn't reached an agreement during the renewal of the contract and Piñeiro left the show in August 2009. Piñeiro said about the situation: "Like in all businesses, things didn't work out; things didn't flow."

After Piñeiro's departure, the producers announced they would make a second competition to choose the new chef of the show.

=== Second competition (2009) ===
The second competition of Operación Chef lasted 19 weeks. In November 2009, Chef Moisés Izquierdo was chosen as the winner after beating Chef Rafael "Thompson" Rodríguez.

=== Chef Moisés (2009-2011) ===
After winning the second competition of Operación Chef in November 2009, Chef Moisés Izquierdo hosted the show until 2011. During his tenure, he coined popular phrases like "Bulla!".

Despite his apparent success with the audience, producers claimed that the ratings weren't as high as they were in previous seasons. In 2011, producer Francisco Zamora decided not to renew Izquierdo's contract. Zamora claimed the reasons were "changes in the channel trends and low numbers on ratings."

=== Five Chefs (2011-present) ===
On March 11, 2011, Francisco Zamora announced the new format for Operación Chef. The new season, that started March 14, 2011, features five professional chefs each focusing on a different area of cuisine. The format will be:

Weekday	Chef	Specialty
Monday	Yasiel Rodríguez	Healthy and organic food
Tuesday	Cynthia Negrón	Sauces
Wednesday	Edgardo Noel Rivera	Fruits and seafood
Thursday	Raquel Díaz	Pastry
Friday	Guillermo González	Tapas
