= Jorge Seijo =

Puerto Rican broadcaster

Jorge E. Seijo Figueroa (born 1942) is a radio and television personality.

== Early years ==
Seijo was born and lived most of his life in Vega Alta, Puerto Rico. At the age of 16 he started his radio career in Manatí, Puerto Rico at a local station, WMNT-AM (1500 kHz). He studied Economics at the University of Puerto Rico at Rio Piedras and post graduate studies at George Washington University. He later worked as a customer service liaison for Eastern Airlines. Joined the United States Army where he served with the 101st Airborne Division and went on a tour of duty in the Vietnam War soon after.

== Radio career ==
Following the war, Seijo rejoined the army as a commissioned officer, stationed in Virginia, before returning to Puerto Rico. He assisted his wife in managing a family business while returning to radio, first as a news commentator in various local radio stations, then as a commentator and producer at WAPA, also known as "WAPA Radio". Philosophical differences with the radio station's owners made him switch to other radio stations (WQII [11-QRadio]; Super Cadena) before settling at WSKN-AM (1320 kHz).

For eleven years, Seijo hosted a program called Puerto Rico Matutino (Morning Puerto Rico) and Hora Siete in WSJU (Canal 30) in Puerto Rico, until Mega TV bought the station and canceled it. For fourteen years he hosted a radio Program in WSKN AM, Radio Isla 1320 called "Hay que tener verguenza".

== Later years ==
On September 2, 2007 Jorge Seijo's wife, Pharmacist Ivette Claudio, died due to a heart attack while getting out of a swimming pool in a party hosted by them at their home in Vega Alta, Puerto Rico.

In 2008, Jorge Seijo remarried Claribel Santiago Lugo one year and a half after his wife's death. Seijo has a daughter, María del Pilar (Maripi) and a son Jorge Efraín; 7 grand children: Gabriel Antonio and Grecia Cristina Villafañe-Seijo; Sofía Alejandra and Andrea Natalia Seijo-Román; José Orlando Claudio-Seijo; Estefanía Teresa and Ivette Lucile.

Jorge Seijo has a recorded message play on an almost every day basis at Puerto Rico's popular television show, SuperXclusivo-La Comay, where he has also joined famous gossip doll La Comay and Cuban actor Hector Travieso for live appearances occasionally

Jorge Seijo is a member of Phi Delta Gamma, a Puerto Rican fraternity founded in Mayagüez (1942).

== See also ==
- List of Puerto Ricans
- Jewish immigration to Puerto Rico
