= Zugey Lamela =

Puerto Rican journalist and news presenter

- Born: March 24, 1982 (age 44)
- Education: University of Puerto Rico, Río Piedras Campus (BA)
- Occupations: Journalist, news presenter
- Employer(s): WLII (Univision) (2004–2014); WKAQ-TV (Telemundo) (2014–present)
- Known for: Investigative journalism
- Awards: Suncoast Emmy Award (2019)

Zugey Lamela (born March 24, 1982) is a Puerto Rican journalist and news presenter. She is the anchor of the investigative news program, Telemundo Responde. In 2019, Lamela won a Suncoast Emmy Award for her investigative reporting.

== Education and career ==
Lamela completed a degree in journalism at University of Puerto Rico, Río Piedras Campus.

Lamela worked as a journalist at Univision Puerto Rico from 2004 until she dismissed in 2014. She began two days later as a television reporter at Telemundo Puerto Rico. She is the news anchor of the investigative news program, Telemundo Responde. In May 2019, reporter Jorge Rivera Nieves joined Lamela as co-anchor of the night edition of Telenoticias PR.

On March 30, 2020, the Governor of Puerto Rico, Wanda Vázquez Garced ended a lengthy and highly publicized interview with Lamela when she was questioned about recent staff dismissals and funding concerns at the Puerto Rico Department of Health.

== Personal life ==
Lamela and her coworker, journalist Walter Soto León, began dating on June 21, 2014. They were engaged in London in March 2015. Lamela and Soto León married on October 4, 2018 at the Hotel El Convento. They honeymooned in Dubai.

== Awards and honors ==
In 2019, Lamela and Millie Jiménez were nominated for the business/consumer category of the Suncoast Regional Emmy Awards for their work, "Pesadilla en el 855." She won the Suncoast Emmy Award for her reporting of "Gabinetes que Almacenan Esquema Familiar" on Telmundo Responde.
