= ¡Qué despelote! =

2010 film

Qué Despelote! La película
- Film poster
- Directed by: Eduardo Ortíz
- Produced by: Yolanda Medina Lerner; Magda Maguie Rivas
- Starring: Tony Banana; Billy Fourquet; Rocky the Kid; Zuleyka Rivera; Johnny Ray Rodriguez; Omar Rodriguez
- Edited by: Eduardo Ortíz
- Music by: Dj Sugar Kid; Troublemaker
- Distributed by: NDE Studios Inc.
- Release date: August 19, 2010 (Puerto Rico)
- Running time: 96 minutes
- Country: Puerto Rico
- Language: Spanish

Qué Despelote! La película (lit. 'How flabby! The movie') is a 2010 Puerto Rican comedy film released on August 19, 2010 by NDE Studios. The film was directed by Eduardo Ortíz.

== Plot ==
After several years with his program "El despelote" at the head of the radio stations in Puerto Rico, Rocky, Billy and Tony go from luxuries to unemployment.

== Cast ==
- Tony Banana
- Billy Fourquet
- Rocky the Kid
- Zuleyka Rivera
- Johnny Ray Rodriguez
- Omar Rodriguez as himself
- Carlos Alberto Lopez as Carlos
- Jorge Pabon as Lechero

== Sequel ==
A sequel entitled Qué Despelotón! was released in March 2014.
