= Zuleyka Rivera =

Puerto Rican actress, model, and beauty queen

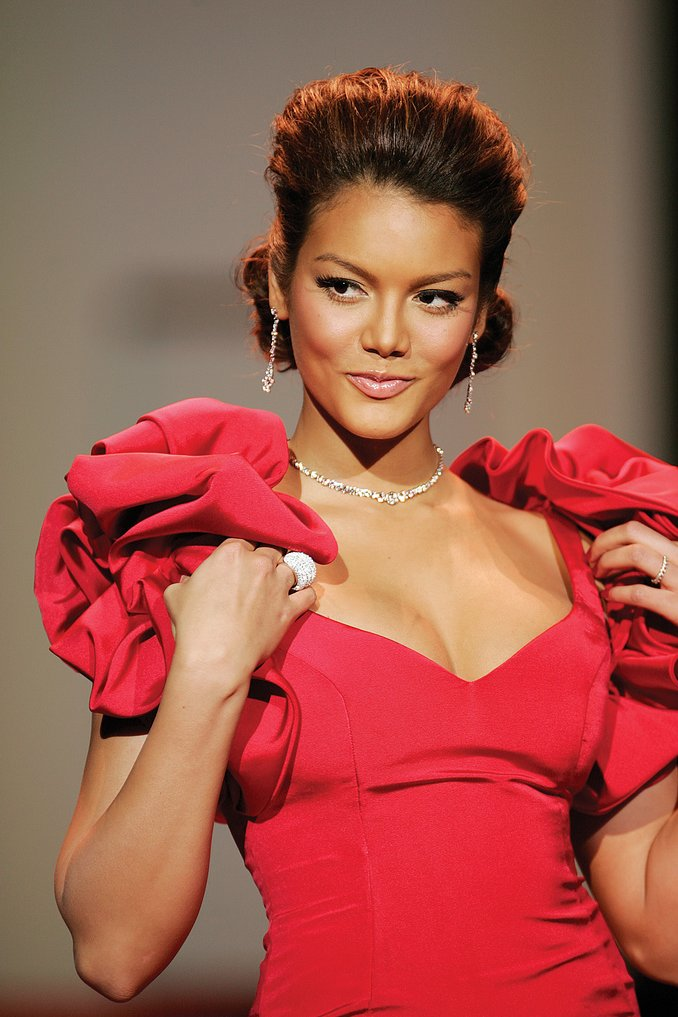
- Rivera in 2007
- Born: Zuleyka Jerrís Rivera Mendoza; October 3, 1987 (age 39); Cayey, Puerto Rico
- Occupations: Actress; model; television presenter
- Height: 175 cm (5 ft 9 in)
- Children: 1
- Beauty pageant titleholder
- Title: Miss Salinas Teen 2002; Miss Salinas Universe 2006; Miss Puerto Rico Universe 2006; Miss Universe 2006
- Years active: 2006–present
- Hair color: Brown
- Eye color: Brown
- Major competitions: Miss Puerto Rico Teen 2002 (1st Runner-up); Miss Puerto Rico Universe 2006 (Winner); Miss Universe 2006 (Winner)

Zuleyka Jerrís Rivera Mendoza (born October 3, 1987) is a Puerto Rican actress, television host, dancer, model and beauty queen who won Miss Universe 2006. She previously won Miss Puerto Rico Universe 2006. She made her acting debut as a telenovela actress in Mexico's Telemundo's soap opera Dame Chocolate (2007), which was followed by several other soap opera roles. In 2017 she appeared in the music video for "Despacito" by Luis Fonsi.

== Early life ==
Born in Cayey, she was raised in Puerto Rico by her parents Jerry Rivera and Carmen Mendoza, along with her two brothers, Jerry, Jr. and Jose Rivera Mendoza. Prior to winning the Miss Puerto Rico title, she first won the local pageant for her hometown of Salinas. She had also placed as the first runner-up in the Miss Teen Puerto Rico pageant. Only eighteen years of age when she was crowned Miss Universe, Rivera is one of the youngest women to win the title.

== Pageantry ==
=== Miss Puerto Rico Universe 2006 ===
Rivera represented her hometown of Salinas at Miss Puerto Rico Universe 2006, held on November 10, 2005, where she was crowned the winner by outgoing titleholder and Miss Universe 2005 first runner-up Cynthia Olavarría. Rivera is the second woman with noticeably mixed features to win Miss Puerto Rico Universe after Alba Reyes in 2004.

=== Miss Universe 2006 ===
Rivera represented Puerto Rico in the Miss Universe 2006 which was televised live internationally from the Shrine Auditorium in Los Angeles, California on 23 July 2006. After competing in swimsuit, evening gown and interview, she was crowned Miss Universe by outgoing titleholder Natalie Glebova of Canada. At the time she was the youngest Miss Universe winner since Amelia Vega in 2003 (until Stefanía Fernández in 2009).

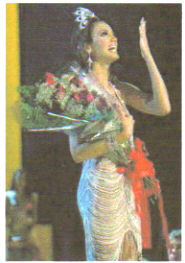
Zuleyka Rivera Mendoza at Miss Universe 2006 where she won the title

Later that evening, Rivera fainted briefly during a press appearance. The incident was reportedly attributed to heat exhaustion (from the stage lights) coupled with the weight of the heavy, chained dress she was wearing.

Rivera was the fifth Puerto Rican to win the title, which makes the island the third most successful entity in the pageant (behind the United States and Venezuela). Zuleyka Rivera Mendoza was the third consecutive delegate from Puerto Rico to make the Top 5 at Miss Universe, after Alba Reyes placed second runner-up in 2004 and Olavarría placed first runner-up in 2005. She is also the first winner from Puerto Rico to have noticeably mixed (African and Indigenous) heritage features, different from her four predecessors (Marisol Malaret, Deborah Carthy-Deu, Dayanara Torres, and Denise Quiñones) who have distinctly European features.

Rivera's win came only five years after Denise Quiñones, the most recent winner from Puerto Rico, won the crown. As Miss Universe, Rivera represented the Miss Universe Organization, both in the United States and internationally. She was based in New York City, where she shared an apartment with Tara Conner, Miss USA and Katie Blair, Miss Teen USA 2006.

At the Miss Universe 2007 pageant she passed her crown to Riyo Mori of Japan on May 28, 2007. Her Miss Universe's reign with only 10 months is one of the shortest reigns in the history of the contest.

==== Reign ====
After being crowned on July 23, 2006, in Los Angeles, Rivera was interviewed by many news teams in Los Angeles and when she arrived at her new home in New York.

From the end of July until early August, Rivera traveled to Japan where she presented the Five Star Diamond Award to the Mandarin Oriental Hotel in Tokyo. She also participated in a photo shoot with Kurara Chibana in San Juan, Puerto Rico, and in Tokyo, Japan. Miss Universe Japan (and first runner-up), and Rivera also visited Mikimoto, the creators of her crown. In late August, Rivera traveled to Indonesia where she attended the opening of a new spa, met with the Minister of Culture, and attended the Miss Indonesia Universe pageant where Agni Pratistha was crowned. While in Indonesia, Rivera also visited Bali. On September 4, 2006, Rivera returned to her home, Puerto Rico for an official homecoming celebration and parade. The following day, Zuleyka Rivera Mendoza returned to her hometown of Salinas.

As of April 2007, Rivera has traveled to the Czech Republic, France, Italy, Russia, Spain, Turkey, Greece, Kazakhstan, India, Mexico, Thailand, Brazil, Puerto Rico, Japan, and Indonesia, in addition to numerous trips around the United States.

On April 1, 2007, Rivera appeared at WrestleMania 23 along with Miss USA 2007 Rachel Smith and Miss Teen USA 2006 Katie Blair, supporting Donald Trump in the Battle of the Billionaires match against Vince McMahon.

== Acting career ==
After finishing her reign as Miss Universe, Rivera expressed her interest in an acting career. She debuted in the 2007 telenovela Dame Chocolate with Carlos Ponce and Karla Monroig. In 2010, she was offered the role of antagonist Rocío Lynch in the telenovela Alguien Te Mira. Later that year, she starred in Aurora as another antagonist, Diana del Valle.

After a brief hiatus due to her pregnancy, Rivera returned to acting in 2012, with a lead role in Rosario. Rivera again plays the role of antagonist Sandra Díaz. In an interview, Rivera said that she has acknowledged she has "the skills for this kind of [antagonist] roles... I handle them pretty well." In 2013, Rivera announced she would play the antagonist lead in the upcoming telenovela Cosita linda, which will start filming in May.

Rivera also had a small role on the film Runner, Runner.

== Personal life ==
From late 2010 to 2013, Rivera dated Dallas Mavericks point guard J. J. Barea. In July 2011, the couple announced they were expecting their first child together. Rivera gave birth to her son Sebastián José Barea Rivera in Minnesota on February 18, 2012. Barea was present during the birth.

During early 2013, there was much speculation that the relationship between Rivera and Barea had ended. However, she assured on an interview that they were still together. On April 18, 2013, Barea released a statement confirming that the relationship was over. Rivera responded with a statement of her own alleging "false information" on Barea's statement. On her statement, Rivera says that "ever since I began filming the telenovela Rosario, there weren't two consecutive weeks where I didn't travel to Minnesota, a place I considered my home, along with the father of my child." She added that she still has the satisfaction "as a woman and mother, that I gave all of me in exchange for our happiness. But this is a labor of two. Life goes on and I keep on going with my head held high."

In 2018, Rivera became a brand ambassador for Eravos.

== Filmography ==
=== Films ===
Year	Title	Role	Notes
2010	Qué despelote! la película	Herself / Receptionist	Cameo appearance

=== Television ===
Year	Title	Role	Notes
2007	Dame Chocolate	Betsy Marvel	
2007	Beyaz Show	Herself	1 episode
2010	Minute to Win It	Herself	Episode: "Last Beauty Standing"
2010	Aurora	Diana del Valle	
2010	Alguien te mira	Rocío Lynch	20 episodes
2013	Rosario	Sandra Díaz	
2014	Cosita linda	Viviana Robles	
2015	La revista de Zuleyka	Herself	Host
2019	El Dragón: Return of a Warrior	Asya	Guest role
2023	Secretos de las Indomables	Herself	Main cast
2025	Miss Universe Latina, el reality	Herself	Team captain

=== Music videos ===
Year	Artist	Title
2017	Luis Fonsi and Daddy Yankee	"Despacito"

== See also ==
- List of Puerto Ricans
- History of women in Puerto Rico
- Miss Universe 2006
- Miss Puerto Rico Universe 2006

Awards and achievements
Preceded by Natalie Glebova (Canada)	Miss Universe; 2006	Succeeded by Riyo Mori (Japan)
Preceded by Cynthia Olavarría	Miss Puerto Rico Universe; 2006	Succeeded by Uma Blasini
Preceded by Cynthia Olavarría	Miss Salinas Universe; 2006	Succeeded by Nathalie Cuevas
