= East Side Story (2006 film) =

- Theatrical release poster
- Directed by: Carlos Portugal
- Written by: Carlos Portugal; Charo Toledo
- Produced by: Carlos Portugal; Mary Feuer
- Starring: Rene Alvarado; Steve Callahan; Gladise Jimenez
- Cinematography: Neil De La Pena
- Edited by: Mary Feuer
- Music by: Steven Cahill
- Production company: Into Action Films
- Distributed by: Peccadillo Pictures (UK)
- Release dates: June 7, 2006 (Newfest Film Festival); October 9, 2006 (United States)
- Running time: 88 minutes
- Country: United States
- Languages: English; Spanish

East Side Story is a 2006 romantic comedy film written, produced, and directed by Carlos Portugal and starring Rene Alvarado, Steve Callahan, and Gladise Jimenez.

== Plot ==
East Side Story is the story of Diego (René Alvarado), a young, closeted Latino, who helps his grandmother (Irene DeBari) run the family restaurant while carrying on a relationship with equally closeted Pablo (David Berón).

Diego has long felt trapped by the conservative culture of East LA and plans to move away and open an upscale restaurant, hopefully with his lover, but Pablo views their relationship very differently - a point driven home when he begins dating Diego's Aunt Bianca (Gladise Jimenez). At the same time, Wesley and his boyfriend move in, gentrifying the neighborhood. The attraction between Wesley and Diego is immediate and electric, forcing both men to reexamine their state of affairs.

== Cast ==
- René Alvarado as Diego Campos
- Steve Callahan as Wesley Henderson
- Gladise Jimenez as Bianca Campos
- David Berón as Pablo Morales
- Irene DeBari as Sara Campos
- Yelyna De Leon as Tiffany
- Luis Raúl as Salvador
- Cory Alan Schneider as Jonathon Webber
- Luis Accinelli as Don Rogelio
- Martin Morales as Luis
- Ruben Rabasa as Efrain Morales
- Chris Franco as Mr. Martinez
- Michael Cormier as Dan

== Release ==
East Side Story was released at the Newfest Film Festival on June 7, 2006. The film was then released in limited cities on October 9, 2006.

== Awards ==
The film won the GLAAD Media Award for Outstanding TV Movie or Limited Series.
