= Sonya Cortés =

Puerto Rican entertainer

- Born: Sonya Cortés González; February 17, 1962 (age 64); Puerto Rico
- Other names: La Bachatera Boricua, La Mami Sonya
- Occupations: TV and Radio Host, Model, Singer, Actress

Sonya Cortés (born February 17, 1962) is a Puerto Rican dancer, actress, comedian, singer, model, and TV and radio host. She was one of the hosts in Univision talk and variety show Anda Pa'l Cara. Cortés is also a bachata singer. She has released three albums. As of 2007 she's also starring on stage with Francisco Gattorno and Marian Pabón in a comedy play. in 2010 she became the host of the Univision program "Locas de Atar".

In 2011, Cortés launched Mami Sonya Jeans, and a perfume in 2017.

== Career ==
Cortéz began her career as a television host, in the late 1990s, on a show called A fuego.

== Discography ==
Year	Album information
2000	Decidida: Release year: 2000; 1st studio album
2002	Para Tí: Release year: 2002; 2nd studio album
2005	Cuando hay Amor: Release year: 2005; 3rd studio album

== Personal life ==
Cortés was married to Ediel Varela.

== See also ==
- List of television presenters/Puerto Rico
- List of Puerto Ricans
