= Carlos McConnie =

Puerto Rican actor and TV host

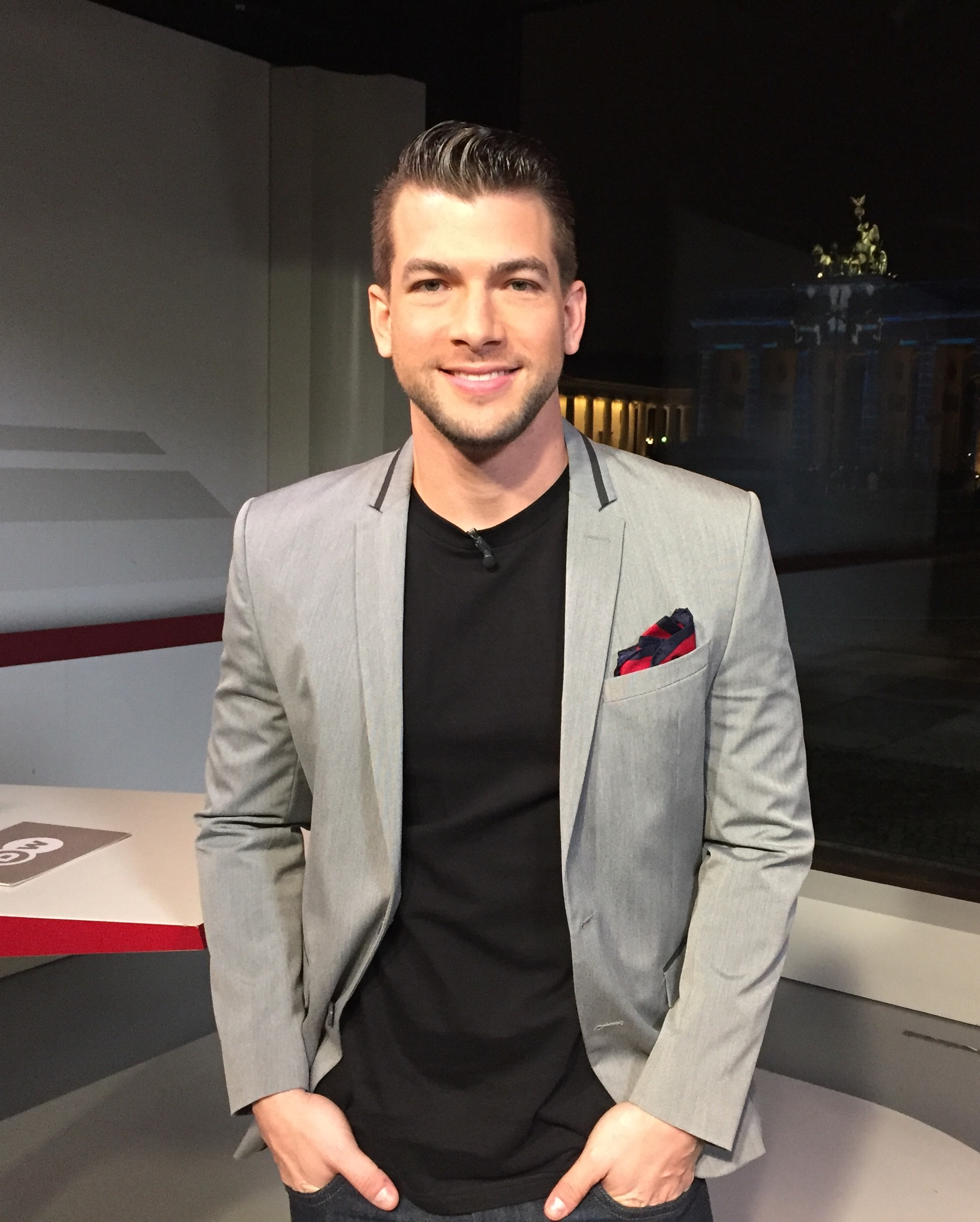
- Carlos McConnie in 2015
- Born: San Juan, Puerto Rico
- Education: Bachelors in Business Administration, Masters in Communications
- Occupations: Television host, actor
- Website: carlosmcconnie.com/en/

Carlos McConnie is a Puerto Rican television host and actor. He hosts the show Euromaxx produced by Deutsche Welle, and appeared on Univision's Sábado Gigante.

== Early life and education ==
Born in San Juan, Puerto Rico, McConnie attended Robinson High School. He earned his bachelor's degree in Business Administration and Masters in Communications degrees.

== History ==
McConnie appeared as a host on MTV Puerto Rico before he was cast for WAPA-TV's show Jangueo TV in 2007. He later became co-host of Univision Puerto Rico's weekly entertainment newscast Flashazo VIP in 2009. In 2011, McConnie became a guest-host on Telefuturas daily show Escándalo TV. He made his acting debut in the TV movie El Corillo in 2012.

McConnie moved to Los Angeles, California in 2013. There he started acting in short films and hosted web-based shows, including Actors E Chat Show and ¡Enterate! con McConnie before he was recruited by Univision Network in Miami, Florida. He was a presenter on the show Mira Quien Baila, and then became a co-host on Nuestra Belleza Latina in 2014, as well as their aftershows, MQB Extra and NBL Extra. He co-hosted Sábado Gigante with Don Francisco, and in 2015 became host of Deutsche Welle's culture magazine Euromaxx for its editions in Spanish and English.

== Filmography ==
2017	“PRIMETIME: ABC PUERTO RICO”	Co-host
2015	Euromaxx	Host
2015	Sábado Gigante	Co-host
2014	Tu Día Alegre	Co-host
2012-2014	Nuestra Belleza Latina	Co-host
2012-2014	Nuestra Belleza Latina Extra	Host
2013	Hoy	Co-host
2013	Mira Quien Baila	Co-host
2013	MQB Extra	Host
2013	Actors Entertainment	Host
2013	Sin Límites	Panelist
2012	"El Corillo"	Actor - "Ricky"
2011	Sal y Pimienta	Guest commentator
2011	Escándalo TV	Co-host
2009	Flashazo VIP	Co-host
2007	Jangueo TV	Host
2004	MTV Puerto Rico	Host
