= WKJB =

Radio station in Mayagüez, Puerto Rico

- Mayagüez, Puerto Rico; Puerto Rico
- Frequency: 710 kHz
- Branding: WKJB 710

Programming
- Format: News/Talk
- Affiliations: Radio Isla

Ownership
- Owner: Empresas Bechara; (Radio Station WKJB AM-FM, Inc.)
- Sister stations: WPRA

History
- First air date: 1946
- Former frequencies: 1340 kHz (1946-1948)
- Call sign meaning: WK Jose Bechara

Technical information
- Licensing authority: FCC
- Facility ID: 54824
- Class: B
- Power: 10,000 watts day 750 watts night
- Transmitter coordinates: 18°10′08″N 67°09′03″W

Links
- Public license information: Public file; LMS
- Website: wkjb710.com

WKJB (710 AM, "Radio Isla 710") is a radio station licensed to serve Mayagüez, Puerto Rico. The station is owned by Radio Station WKJB AM-FMc, Inc. It airs a News/Talk format.

The station was assigned the WKJB call letters by the Federal Communications Commission.
