= SuperXclusivo =

Puerto Rican gossip/news show

- Also known as: SuperXclusivo (2000–2013); La Comay (2019-2025)
- Genre: Gossip; Infotainment; Tabloid
- Created by: Kobbo Santarrosa
- Based on: La Cháchara; La Condesa del Bochinche
- Directed by: Riquin Sánchez; Maximiliano Paglia; Dagmarie Berríos
- Starring: Kobbo Santarrosa; Héctor Travieso; Roque Gallart; Yan Ruiz
- Opening theme: "La Comay Theme"
- Ending theme: "La Comay Theme" (instrumental)
- Country of origin: United States
- Original language: Spanish
- No. of seasons: 13 (SuperXclusivo); 5 (La Comay)

Production
- Executive producer: Kobbo Santarrosa
- Producer: Dagmarie Berríos
- Camera setup: Multi-camera
- Running time: 65 minutes (including commercials)

Original release
- Network: WAPA
- Release: January 24, 2000 – January 9, 2013
- Network: Mega TV
- Release: January 28, 2019 – December 18, 2020
- Network: TeleOnce
- Release: March 1, 2021 – January 31, 2025

Related
- A Solas con Kobbo Santarrosa (WORA-TV)

SuperXclusivo (also known as La Comay) was a Puerto Rican gossip show that aired on WAPA-TV from 2000 until 2013, later on Mega-TV from 2019 to 2020, and finally on TeleOnce (WLII-DT) from 2021 until 2025. It was hosted by puppet gossiper La Comay — The Gossiper, created, voiced and puppeteered by Antulio "Kobbo" Santarrosa. La Comay was joined by a co-host, a role which at different points was filled by Héctor Travieso, Roque Gallart and Yan Ruiz.

The show, originally premiered on WAPA-TV as SuperXclusivo on January 24, 2000. La Comay, the character, presented celebrity and political gossip, as well as news and social commentary on local issues. Through its original run, SuperXclusivo maintained the top position in local ratings. The show ended its original run on WAPA-TV on January 9, 2013, after Kobbo Santarrosa resigned from the network amid boycotts against him for homophobic allegations he made on air through the puppeteering of La Comay. On December 19, 2018, it was confirmed that La Comay would be returning to television to Mega TV. The new show, titled after the puppet gossiper, premiered on January 28, 2019 and ended on December 18, 2020, after Santarrosa decided not to renew the show's contract with the network. This resulted the show to move to TeleOnce on March 1, 2021, with comedian Yan Ruiz as the new co-host, where it remained until its final episode on January 31, 2025.

== History ==
=== 1995–2000: Origins in Telemundo ===
Before SuperXclusivo, Kobbo Santarrosa had created two characters, La Cháchara ("The Tittle-Tattler") and La Condesa del Bochinche ("The Gossip Countess") which were featured on various gossip and entertainment news shows in Puerto Rico. He created the character of La Comay in 1995, featuring her first segments in El Show de las 12 on Telemundo, and then on its own show called X-clusivo. At the time, Santarrosa was accompanied by host Eddie Miró. Santarrosa left Telemundo in 1999.

=== 2000–2013: Longtime run on WAPA-TV ===
Santarrosa joined WAPA-TV where he took La Comay to her new gossip program, creating SuperXclusivo, accompanied by Cuban actor/comedian Héctor Travieso as co-host and journalist Leo Fernández III as field reporter, who would later leave the show. During the 13 years that SuperXclusivo aired, it was the most watched television show in Puerto Rico, according to local ratings.

In the original show's later years, many politicians and high-profile figures attended the show for interviews, including governors Aníbal Acevedo Vilá, Luis Fortuño and Alejandro García Padilla during each of their incumbencies.

In its final years in WAPA-TV, the show closely followed the investigation and accusations in the March 9, 2010 murder of 8-year-old Lorenzo González Cacho. SuperXclusivo conducted their own investigations throughout the murder's course and came to conclusions that exposed irregularities in the investigations, which differed from official evidence and investigations presented in court. Among those, was the crime scene, which was not secured and was cleaned after investigators recorded their findings, before forensics could thoroughly analyze it.

=== 2014–2015: Rumors of return on TV ===
Long after Santarrosa's resignation from WAPA-TV in 2013, several rumors arose on multiple occasions about a possible return of La Comay to television. Most rumors indicated that she would make her comeback on Mega TV; other rumors claimed that her return would be on Univision Puerto Rico. In November 2014, Héctor Travieso publicly said that La Comay would return in 2015 with Santarrosa and him at the helm, though it was never specified which network or platform the return would take place. In an article published in February 2015, rumors of the return of La Comay again surfaced of a comeback on Mega TV.

=== 2018–present: Reappearance and return to television ===
On October 9, 2018, both La Comay and Héctor Travieso reappeared in online media and television (including the airwaves of WAPA-TV, where SuperXclusivo originally aired) to announce a 2019 concert date for Bad Bunny in Puerto Rico, marking their first television and media appearance since SuperXclusivo was cancelled in 2013 and further fueling longtime rumors of a comeback. The concert announcement was filmed in a full recreation of the set of SuperXclusivo. On the reason why he chose to "revive" La Comay, the singer commented the show was "very present in the popular culture of Puerto Rico" as well as it was part of his family and his childhood in the early decade of 2000, "everybody grew up watching La Comay"; this reappearance led to continue speculations of a return to TV, which Santarrossa stated, in November 2018, the idea was not discarded.

After years of speculation, it was confirmed that La Comay would be returning to television to Mega TV in a show titled after the puppet character. Sylvia Hernández, who previously worked in SuperXclusivo, returned as a field reporter on the new show after leaving other gossip/analysis shows. In March 2019, it was reported that La Comay would be extended to audiences in Florida. On March 29, 2019, Héctor Travieso announced his resignation from the show due to personal life purposes and was replaced shortly by Roque Gallart in April 2019 as co-host and sidekick.

On December 11, 2020, Kobbo Santarrosa announced La Comay's contract will not be renewed with the network and aired its final episode on December 18, 2020. This resulted the show to move to TeleOnce as of March 1, 2021, with comedian Yan Ruiz as the new co-host and sidekick.

At the end of the December 4, 2023 episode of La Comay, the character announced that the show would be ending the same month, airing its last episode on December 22, 2023. TeleOnce and its owner Liberman Media Group indicated they had planned on continuing to air the show but Kobbo Santarosa had decided to retire from television and that they supported his decision completely. On the day of the final show TeleOnce aired a special called ¡Qué Bochinche! Donde todo comenzó which recounted the trajectory of Santarosa and the character of La Comay.

On July 25, 2024, Kobbo Santarrosa announced on Social Networks that La Comay would return to TeleOnce "for one final season" due to popular demand. The show returned on August 5, 2024 and saw the return of Rocky The Kid as the puppet's co-host

== La Comay, the character ==
La Comay, the character, is a life-sized puppet created and puppeteered by Antulio "Kobbo" Santarrossa, a professional ventriloquist. Santarrosa himself is never credited as the performer of the character, as La Comay always states he is her manager. La Comay is meant to represent a society matron who recounts rumors, gossip, and comments on social and political news. She was joined by Cuban soap opera actor Héctor Travieso by her side until March 2019; radio personality and public figure Roque Gallart replaced Travieso as of April 2019. On December 13, 2012, La Comay was interviewed by Wyatt Cenac in his final story for The Daily Show with Jon Stewart.

== Boycott and cancellation ==
On December 4, 2012, Santarrosa, through his puppeteering of La Comay, commented on the allegations that the recent murder of a local public relations agent was related to a promiscuous homosexual lifestyle. The comments sparked a backlash, particularly on social media, and started a movement to boycott the show led by LGBT activist Pedro Julio Serrano. The movement crowd-sourced requests for sponsors to drop support for the show, and within a week, sixteen sponsors had removed their commercials from the show's timeslot, including dental hygiene products, telecommunication companies, health care providers and supermarket chains.

On January 8, 2013, after being asked to pre-record the show rather than present it live, Santarrosa abruptly left WAPA-TV approximately an hour before the show was slated to air; the episode that aired that day was a re-run of the previous day. The next day, January 9, 2013, Santarrosa presented his resignation in person at WAPA-TV, and the regularly scheduled program was substituted by a movie; later that night, the TV station confirmed Santarrosa's resignation.

=== Aftermath ===
==== Timeslot replacement ====
In February 2013, Santarrosa's timeslot in WAPA-TV was replaced by a new live gossip show titled Lo Sé Todo (I Know It All) starring Frankie Jay, Roque Gallart, Sylvia Hernández, Jessica Serrano, and radio producer, Carlos "Topy" Mamery. Jay, Serrano and Hernández, who previously worked as field reporters for Santarrosa in the final years of SuperXclusivo's run, continued their work as field reporters on Lo Sé Todo until Gallart, Serrano and Hernández eventually left the program, the latter two for Dando Candela, the show's main competitor; Mamery died in December 2014. Gossip journalist Pedro Juan Figueroa joined the show in March, after leaving Dando Candela, which led to improved ratings. He left the program, months after a hiatus during the aftermath of Hurricane Maria's impact in Puerto Rico and returned months later.

==== Travieso's transition to Dando Candela ====
Over a year after the cancellation of SuperXclusivo, Héctor Travieso accepted a contract to join Dando Candela on Telemundo. Travieso reportedly called Santarrosa before accepting, and Santarrosa encouraged him to take it. Travieso joined Dando Candela in January 2014; however, he quit in May, after less than four months at the show. Rumors stated that Travieso's resignation was related to management concerns about a possible return to TV with Santarrosa.

==== La Comay: Aparente y Alegadamente (Movie) ====
In September 2014, Manolo Travieso-Hurst, son of Héctor Travieso, announced the release of a documentary he was co-producing based on La Comay. The documentary, La Comay: Aparente y Alegadamente, had a theatrical release in November 2014 and was told via interviews conducted by former Univision reporter Liza Lugo, a constant target of La Comay. Among those interviewed, included public figures who were either involved or affected by La Comay, such as journalist Carmen Jovet, analyst Rubén Sánchez, former mayor of San Juan Jorge Santini, radio host Jorge Seijo, LGBT activist Pedro Julio Serrano, and others. Kobbo Santarosa himself was also interviewed in his home in Orlando.

== Return and retirement ==
On December 19, 2018, it was confirmed that La Comay would be returning to television to Mega TV after years of speculation. The new show, titled after the puppet gossiper, premiered on January 28, 2019 and ended on December 18, 2020, after Santarrosa decided not to renew the show's contract with the network. This resulted the show to move to TeleOnce on March 1, 2021, with comedian Yan Ruiz as the new co-host, eventually replaced once again by Roque Gallart. On January 8, 2025 the show aired a tribute to Hector Traviaso after his death. La Comay aired its final episode on January 31, 2025, with Santarrosa announcing he would be retiring from media business.
