= WPRA =

Radio station in Mayagüez, Puerto Rico

Mayaguez, Puerto Rico; Puerto Rico
- Broadcast area: Puerto Rico
- Frequency: 990 kHz
- Branding: WPRA 990 AM

Programming
- Format: Spanish Variety

Ownership
- Owner: Empresas Bechara; (WPRA, Inc.)
- Sister stations: WKJB

History
- First air date: July 13, 1937
- Former frequencies: 1370 kHz (1937-1940); 780 kHz (1940-1942)
- Call sign meaning: Puerto; Rico; Advertising; Company

Technical information
- Licensing authority: FCC
- Facility ID: 1889
- Class: B
- Power: 910 watts
- Transmitter coordinates: 18°10′8″N 67°9′3″W

Links
- Public license information: Public file; LMS
- Website: wpra990.com

WPRA (990 AM) is a radio station broadcasting a Spanish Variety format. Licensed to Mayaguez, Puerto Rico, it serves the Puerto Rico area. The station is currently owned by Empresas Bechara through its licensee, WPRA, Inc.

During 1958, 15 year old actor Adrian Garcia made his acting debut at this radio station, beginning what would be a prolific acting career in radio, film, television and theater.
