= Gricel Mamery =

Puerto Rican television host and comedian

Gricel Mamery Muñoz (born January 25, 1967, in Mayagüez) is a Puerto Rican television hostess and comedian, best known for her appearance on the Puerto Rican show Anda Pa'l Cara, and commentator for the Spanish language program, broadcast in Puerto Rico.

Gricel is the sister of late Puerto Rican music producer Topy Mamery, the artist and art director Gilbert "Tito" Mamery, and radio and marketing personality Eric William Mamery, daughter of the late Puerto Rican radio disc-jockey and marketeer Gilbert Mamery. Lebanese-born textile industrialist. She divorced from fisherman, lawyer, Eugenio "Geño" Piñeiro Soler.

== Career ==
Mamery became one of the longest running female hosts in Puerto Rican television, often considered to be competing for titles of beautiful hair, beautiful legs, and beautiful face in TV contests held by gossip and celebrity magazines in Puerto Rico, primarily Teve Guía and Vea.

She hosted the late night Puerto Rican Television show Anda Pa'l Cara from 2001 to 2005, teamed up with stand-up comedian Luis Raúl and then with Puerto Rican celebrity (and fellow Mayagüez native) Rafael Jose to keep it among the most popular talk shows in Puerto Rico's television industry.

She was the host of the Puerto Rican Television show "¡Que Noche!" along with Crystal Ayala and Nelson Bermejo. The show aired on WIPR/PRTV, San Juan's channel 6 at 10:00 pm (AST).

== Biography ==
Named after the song, Gricel, often interpreted by worlds famous tango Carlos Gardel. This is of no surprise after considering that her father Gilbert Mamery was recognized as one of the world class experts in documenting Gardel's biography and music. She attained elementary and upper school education at Academia de la Inmaculada Concepción a private catholic school in Mayagüez, Puerto Rico, where she was regarded by her classmates as a naturally born comedian lighted by a charming and popular personality. She later attended the University of Puerto Rico at Mayagüez.

Gricel initial professional life started in the radio industry. First works where engaged a part-time job in her native Mayagüez. At the request of her brother Eric William, Gricel performed comedy/woman themes at her father's radio station, WTIL-AM. She was quite hesitant about doing radio, given her brothers' and father's status as reputed radio personalities. She co-produced "¿Qué hay de nuevo?" with fellow station administrator, Toñi Basora. In typical comedy duo fashion, Basora was the "straight" face of the duo, and Gricel was the jokester reaching good industry reviews mainly due to Gricel's impeccable sense of comedy timing, which complemented Basora's dry sense of humor. Limitations of the local radio market forced retirement of the show one year later. Follow the end of the radio show performance in 1990, Gricel accepted a job as the head hostess of Mayagüez Hilton Hotel's Night Club.

When the Piñeros moved to San Juan, Puerto Rico, and at the request of Hector Marcano, she moved to television in the late 1990s on Marcano's Super Show, which aired on Univision Puerto Rico, often appearing behind the scenes as a announcer. Marcano later moved her in front of the camera to become one of the presenters in the show. Due to her quick wit, beauty and physical assets (she needed a breast lift after giving birth to her son and made this decision public; while gossip columnists incorrectly theorized about an augmentation, she was "all natural" at the time) she got plenty of attention from the media, often appearing in gossip magazine columns in local magazines Vea and TeVe Guia.

She later moved to WAPA-TV as the station's movie presenter, injecting her personal brand of humor to comments about featured movies. She would also introduce upcoming movies in a small segment within one of the highest rated television shows in Puerto Rican history, a controversial daily gossip and comedy show called SuperXclusivo, produced by fellow Mayagüez native, Antulio "Kobbo" Santarrosa. Although hers was a two-minute segment only showing her from waist up, this led to even more popularity, since La Comay was a regular #1 or #2 in the weekly and monthly ratings chart, and often made popular topic by magazines like TeVe Guia and Vea.

She was then hired to be the replacement hostess to one of the most popular late night television shows in Puerto Rico Anda Pa'l Cara, replacing Silverio Pérez, and having Puerto Rican stand up comedian Luis Raúl as co-host. Gricel reinvented her image as to provide a more serious, age-appropriate profile within the show. The show was a success during its many incarnations, from 2001 to 2005.

After a much publicized feud with the show's producers she was let go of Anda Pa'l Cara, and she decided to take a rest from the public eye. Public demand for her return to entertainment moved her back into radio, in 2006, with Raymond Arrieta as a co-host. Raymond, in turn, featured her regularly in his long running comedy show, El Show de Raymond, which was aired on WAPA-TV until early 2010. They currently host "Gozando en la mañana", a morning talk show, on Fidelity 95 radio in San Juan.

Mamery was featured as a presenter for ¡Qué noche!, a variety program on WIPR-TV, until January 2012 (see below). She also appeared in a 1980s period film, "Party Time" (directed by Juanma Fernández París), as the aerobics-obsessed mother of one of the film's teenagers.

Gricel became an occasional color reporter on Puerto Rican lifestyle and pop culture for Despierta América, starting in 2007. She later became an occasional guest presenter for Argentinian-born paparazzo Javier Ceriani's "Papparazzi TV" program on Mega TV.

== Controversy ==
=== The 2012 San Sebastian Street Festival incident ===
The Fiestas de la Calle San Sebastián (San Sebastian Street Festival) has become a popular event in the old city of San Juan, where thousands of Puerto Ricans and visitors to the city gather during a weekend every January to celebrate the feast of the street's patron saint, SanSe As the feast is heavily attended, balconies in the buildings near the celebration have become a spot to see and be seen. Mamery and other public media companions (including Raymond Arrieta, Javier Ceriani, and former Despierta América teammate Ana María Canseco) were at the balcony of one of the rooms of the Old San Juan on January 13, 2012. While Mamery was greeting the audience gathered below, Ceriani lifter her blouse and groped her breasts, which were covered with a brassiere lined in golden lamé. Pictures also showed Ceriani and Mamery kissing. He later mooned the audience from the balcony. Ceriani apparently wanted to shock the audience through his stunts due to the speculation about his media prevalent at the time. Arrieta, who was at the balcony himself, could only stare in shock -and, he later claimed, in disbelief.

Media outlets like a photo sequence of the incident; a video of it was also published through media outlets and TV. The incident got Mamery's WIPR-TV contract canceled almost immediately after, based on a clause that demanded public performers not to engage in scandalous behavior in public. The station's chief executive officer, Pedro Rúa, happens to be Jovet's son. This led at least one gossip columnist to speculate about a possible reprisal from Rúa about the Central American and Caribbean Games' controversy as a motivation for the firing. The incident became a subject of public opinion and controversy in Puerto Rican media and social networks for over two weeks. People in favor of Mamery's firing claimed that she had staged the incident, while people against it speculated that it was a disproportionate reaction to a situation that was not within her control.

Since Mamery claimed she was a passive recipient of Ceriani's groping and kissing, feminist organizations like Puerto Rico's Proyecto Matria objected to the firing, speculating that, had Mamery been a man, the incident would have been a non-issue. These organizations also pointed out that, as WIPR is a public broadcasting station, Mamery was technically a government employee, and that the subjects of some ongoing high-profile corruption cases within the Puerto Rican government had not been as hastily fired as Mamery was. Students at staged a demonstration on campus on January 19, 2012, in defense of Mamery. Many protesters -particularly men- wore brassieres outside their clothing as a sign of protest. At least one support page for Mamery has been opened.

Mamery kept silent about the controversy for about a week, but not before her older brother Topy, a media figure in his own right, denounced his sister's being taken advantage of by Ceriani and Arrieta's passive acceptance. He had strong words for Ceriani, claiming that he only lived for controversy and for scandal. He also chastised his sister mildly for letting herself become a subject of public scandal, albeit an unwilling one. Gricel then issued a written press brief denouncing that she had been publicly humiliated and fired without allowing her side of the story to be told. She also thanked the overwhelming support she had received from the Puerto Rican public in the days after the incident.

Mamery returned to her radio program after a one-week break on January 23. Arrieta suggested she'd auction her golden bra and give the proceeds to a breast cancer charity, to which she accepted. He also joked that this could be a good excuse for her to renew her wardrobe and get rid of "granny bras". She hinted that an opportunity for her to make her case would eventually be given by Rúa. She also explained Ceriani's behavior as him being his own self, "a crazy, uninhibited guy", and that little could be done from preventing him from doing what he did.

== See also ==
- List of Puerto Ricans
