= Carlos Mamery =

Puerto Rican television personality

- Born: March 11, 1960; Mayagüez, Puerto Rico
- Died: December 2, 2014 (aged 54); Guaynabo, Puerto Rico
- Occupation: Music producer
- Spouse: Yolandita Monge (m. 1989)

Carlos "Topy" Mamery (March 11, 1960 – December 2, 2014) was a Puerto Rican music producer, television personality and executive at Mega TV and Spanish Broadcasting System's Puerto Rico division. Mamery was a judge on the reality music competition show Idol Puerto Rico from its launch in 2011 until his death.

== Life and career ==
Topy Mamery was the son of disc jockey, Gilbert Mamery. Mamery is the brother of comedian and television host, Gricel Mamery, and marketing impresario, Eric William Mamery. He was married to singer Yolandita Monge from 1989 until his death, with whom they shared a son, Imanol.

Mamery had a recurring public opinion segment in the WAPA-TV gossip news show "Lo Sé Todo", called El Rollo de Topy, which also received a primetime special aired on November 30, 2014, receiving high ratings.

=== Shalimar scandal ===
In 2014, the Puerto Rican edition of TVyNovelas tabloid magazine published photographs of Mamery kissing model, Shalimar Rivera, alleging an affair. Mamery addressed the allegations on the WAPA-TV show, "Lo Sé Todo," saying, "When one has as much time in this business, you learn how to fight battles and I've fought many...When you respond to these things, you go on a hallway with no end because then comes another one and another one and another one." Additional pictures of Mamery and Rivera were released via Univision in November 2014.

Mamery and Rivera both denied the affair, while his wife, Yolandita Monge, publicly denied the allegations against her husband, saying that their marriage was stable in an interview with Primera Hora.

== Death ==
Carlos Mamery suffered a massive heart attack at his home in Guaynabo, Puerto Rico, on December 2, 2014. He was taken unresponsive to a hospital, where he was pronounced dead at the age of 54. Mamery was survived by his wife, Yolandita Monge, and their son, Imanol, as well as his two children from a previous marriage.
