= Alexandra Fuentes =

Puerto Rican actress

- Born: Alexandra Fuentes Rivera; January 23, 1978 (age 48); Caguas, Puerto Rico
- Education: University of Puerto Rico, Río Piedras; University of Turabo (MBA)
- Occupations: Actress; radio and television host; comediante productor
- Spouse: David Bernier (m. 2007)
- Children: Adrián David; Miranda

Alexandra Fuentes Rivera (born January 23, 1978) is a Puerto Rican actress, comedian, tv producer and radio host. She was the main host of Univision Puerto Rico talk and variety show Anda Pa'l Cara from 2005 to 2009, as well as the host of Telemundo Puerto Rico entertainment show Dando Candela until 2013. She was also the host of Fidelity 95.7 FM morning show Gozando en la Mañana, with Raymond Arrieta. She had her own talk show Alexandra De Noche (now Telemundo De Noche) on Telemundo Puerto Rico until she left the show in 2016 to support her husband, David Bernier, in his campaign for Governor of Puerto Rico.

== Early years and education ==
Alexandra Fuentes was born in the Regional Hospital of Caguas, Puerto Rico, and raised in the Bayamon Borough in Cidra, Puerto Rico. Her parents are Nilda Rivera, a homemaker and seamstress, and Rubén Fuentes, a mechanic. Fuentes has an older sister, Verónica, and two younger siblings, Natalee and Rubén.

From an early age, Fuentes showed interest in acting. When she was 12 years old, she joined the Pitri Group, a local theater troupe founded by Víctor Torres, where she performed as an actress and dancer. In a 2015 interview, Torres praised Fuentes' discipline, which he called "her best weapon to achieve what she has today". He also added that Fuentes was "dynamic, knew what she wanted, was helpful, good friend, and always had that naturality that she still preserves". During those years, she distinguished herself doing impersonations of Cantinflas and La India María, two popular Mexican characters.

In 1996, Fuentes graduated from Ana J. Candelas High School, where she was president of the Yearbook club. After that, she went to the University of Puerto Rico in Río Piedras where she studied Labor Relations. She also completed a Master's degree in Business Administration from University of Turabo. During her college years, she continued acting in theater.

== Entertainment career ==
Fuentes started her professional career in the early 2000s, when she worked as a reporter for the show Zúmbate. After that, she became part of the local parody show Sálvese Quien Pueda where she came to be known for parodying Gricel Mamery. During that time, she also started hosting the segment NBA Jams in Deportes 13.

In the summer of 2005, producer Tony Mojena offered her to be the host of Pa' Que te lo Goces. That same year she was hired to replace Mamery as host of Anda Pa'l Cara. In an interview, she described that year as "magical". She remained with the show until its cancellation in 2009, sharing hosting duties with celebrities like Rafael José, Sonya Cortés, Rony The Hyper, and Héctor Marcano among others.

Shortly after that, she started hosting Dando Candela, a new show dedicated to entertainment news. In 2013, she left the show after four years.

In 2014, Fuentes started hosting her own talk show called Alexandra de Noche.

== Personal life ==
Fuentes is currently married to David Bernier, former Secretary of State of Puerto Rico. They were married on November 24, 2007. They have two children together, Adrián David (born August 26, 2008) and Miranda (born December 27, 2010).

== See also ==
- List of television presenters/Puerto Rico
- List of Puerto Ricans
