= Silverio Pérez =

Puerto Rican musician, producer and media personality

- Born: July 18, 1948 (age 77); Guaynabo, Puerto Rico
- Occupations: comedian; writer; motivational speaker; singer; musician; composer; chemical engineer
- Years active: 1971–present

Silverio Pérez Figueroa (born July 18, 1948 in Guaynabo, Puerto Rico) is a Puerto Rican musician, writer, comedian, entrepreneur and broadcasting media host.

== Early life ==
Pérez is the oldest of the eleven children of Silverio Pérez Rosado (1914–2024) and Victorina Figueroa Amador (1925–2022). While Pérez was a teenager he became involved in various church singing groups and in the Puerto Rican production of Up with People. He later formed a duo, Silverio y Roxana, that specialized in Puerto Rican music, and as a result, was a guest -and later hosted- a typical Puerto Rican music television program, "Borinquen Canta", along with news broadcaster Guillermo José Torres. He holds a bachelor's degree in Chemical Engineering from the University of Puerto Rico at Mayagüez and a Master's degree in Literary Creation from Universidad del Sagrado Corazón in San Juan, Puerto Rico., but remained active as a part-time singer while completing his studies. Pérez began working at Caribbean Gulf, monitoring the process of the gasoline. He then realized that Engineering, while a lucrative career, did not fulfill his vocation as a singer.

During his period as a student of the University of Puerto Rico at Mayaguez, Perez met and befriended such legendary figures as politician Jose Enrique Arraras, basketball star Fufi Santori and sportscaster Elliott Castro. (in Spanish)

== Career ==
Pérez formally started his career with the singing group Haciendo Punto en Otro Son with four debut concerts at a night club called "La Tea" in San Juan (October 30 – November 2, 1975). This band, whose original members included Irvin García, Jossy Latorre, Nano Cabrera and Tony Croatto, toured all of Puerto Rico and some other countries, recording various albums and 8-tracks. The group faced blacklisting in some Puerto Rican towns due to the political nature of some of its songs, and experienced numerous personnel changes over time (most notably Croatto's, who as a non-native Puerto Rican felt uncomfortable by the situation). Haciendo Punto would "break up" twice during the 1980s, to be reformed in the late 1990s.

As a musician he appeared along his wife performing in a protest supporting the UPR strike. TeVe Guía published an article about this presentation and the act gathered the interest of producer Tommy Muñiz. While making an appearance in Borinquen canta, the producer decided to place Pérez as host since the original had left Puerto Rico suddenly to film a telenovela. He introduced the show, but in the process forgot to introduce himself, a mistake that was emphasized by the media. Despite this, Pérez established himself in the role for two years, eventually leaving due to conflicts with his professional career. In February 1972, the couple had fraternal twins, Mariem and Carlos Javier.

During the 1980s, Muñiz and WRIK-TV placed Pérez as the host of the talk show Peña en downbeat, while his children hosted a similar concept aimed at children in Dimensión Juvenil.

After Haciendo Punto en Otro Son went into a hiatus, Pérez went into Puerto Rican television with the Los Rayos Gamma show. In Los Rayos Gamma, he teamed up with Sunshine Logroño, Jacobo Morales and Horacio Olivo to satirize Puerto Rican politics. After Channel 11 went bankrupt, Los Rayos Gamma moved to Muñiz's channel, WRIK-TV. The group debuted on November 1, 1981. He was along several figures, including Los Gamma, that participated in the inauguration of Súper Siete following the sale of the channel. Later on, he became the show host of the successful program, En Serio Con Silverio.

In 1994, he appeared in Rafo Muñiz's special, ¿A quién no le falta un tornillo?. In 1995, he was credited with coining the term El Chupacabras (frequently anglicized as Chupacabra), referring to creatures around Puerto Rico with a habit of attacking and drinking the blood of livestock, especially goats. On February 3, 1997, he participated in Los 75 años de don Tommy, a special dedicated to Muñiz's career.

In 2000, he debuted in the show Anda Pa'l Cará on Tele Once; it aired until 2009.

- hosting several successful Puerto Rican television shows during his career including the most recent Anda Pa'l Cará.
- performing with the known group of political satire called Los Rayos Gamma (The Gamma Rays)
- performing with the nueva trova group called Haciendo Punto en Otro Son.
- his motivational lectures which are usually called "Humortivación" (Humortivation).
- allegedly coining the term chupacabra to name the mythical creature responsible for various attacks on animals in Puerto Rico, Mexico and the United States

== Accident and illness ==
In 1989, an electric gate caught Pérez's right arm and fractured various arm and hand bones, for which he underwent surgery on at least four occasions. On October 31, 2005, Pérez had a cancerous tumor removed from his prostate. Until then, Pérez had been fairly successful in hiding his illness from the Puerto Rican public.

== Works ==
He wrote, in 1996, a book named Humortivación ("Humortivation", a portmanteau of "Humor" & "motivación"/"motivation"; published in 1998, ISBN 9990024847), which promotes motivation through humor. It had two sequels, Más Humortivación: el camino del éxito ("More Humortivation: the Path for Success", 2000, ISBN 9780970201102) and Humortivación… otra vez ("Humortivation… Again", 2007, ISBN 1575819139), plus a follow-up, Domesticando tu dinosario ("Domesticating Your Dinosaur", 2005, ISBN 6070739310).

In 2004, he wrote El humor nuestro de cada día: las tres tristes tribus ("Our Humor of Every Day: the Three Sad Tribes", ISBN 1932271368), a critique about Puerto Rican politics. The "three sad tribes" in the title refer to the three local political parties (PPD, PNP, & PIP) that have dominated politics in the island since 1968. It was followed up in 2008 by another political critique, Desde mi grúa: manual del elector aguzao ("From My Crane: Manual of the Intelligent Voter", ISBN 9584513303).

In 2009 he released Prefiero ser trovador: décimas con amor y humor (ISBN 0982034318) as a book + CD bundle, which was later followed in 2011 by Punto decimal: décimas para decir más, also a book + CD bundle.

In 2010 he wrote a motivational book, Abracadabra: buenas palabras ("Abracadabra: Good Words", ISBN 0615404758).

He also wrote Paso a paso… por el Camino de Santiago: Crónica de un peregrino ("Step by Step… Through the Road to Santiago: Chronicle of a Peregrine", 2014, ISBN 0990330923), a memoir chronicling his experience during his peregrination to the Santiago de Compostela Cathedral in Galicia, Spain.

In 2016 he wrote La vitrina rota o ¿qué carajo pasó aquí? ("The Broken Vitrine, or What the Fuck Happened Here?", ISBN 1615052585), in which he offered his "introspective view into Puerto Rican history from 1898 to the present", with emphasis on why Puerto Rico filed for bankruptcy. During 2017, he also offered conferences in Puerto Rico and in United States about the island's current situation, based on the contents of this book.

In 2017 he wrote a novel, Un espejo en la selva ("A Mirror in the Jungle", ISBN 9786070737572), about a Puerto Rican psychologist kidnapped by FARC militants in Colombia. He has written several books. Two of the most recent ones, Un Espejo en la Selva (2017, a novel) and La vitrina rota o ¿qué carajo pasó aquí? (2016), were awarded by International Latino Book Awards as Best Drama and Historical Book, respectively. He is the composer of songs, among them, the danza dedicated to the island of Vieques ("Isla Nena").

In 2018 he wrote his memoir book Sólo CUENTO con el CUENTO que te CUENTO ("I Only COUNT with the TALE I TELL You", ISBN 1731451644), where he told his memories as "parent, professional, artist, and Puerto Rican".

Pérez writes a column for El Nuevo Día called Punto de Vista (Point of View). He gives "Humortivacion" talks in Puerto Rico and the US, promoting his most recent novel by the same name.

In 2020, Pérez recorded Guardame un abrazo with his spouse and 8 other musicians.

In 2023, Pérez published El secreto de mi padre ("My Father's Secret"), a biography of his father Silverio Pérez Rosado, who died on April 25th, 2024 aged, 109 years and 310 days and was the oldest living man in Puerto Rico.

== See also ==
- List of Puerto Ricans
- List of Puerto Rican songwriters
- List of University of Puerto Rico at Mayagüez people
