= WKAQ-TV =

Television station in San Juan, Puerto Rico

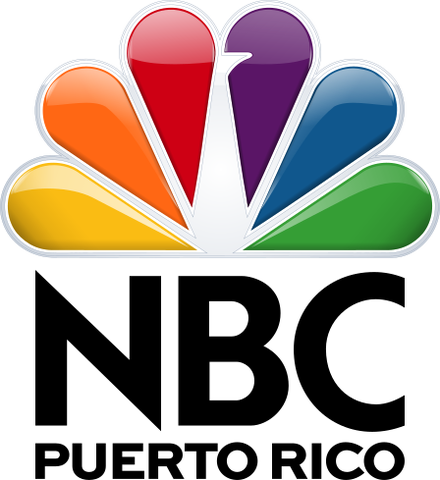
- San Juan; Puerto Rico
- Channels: Digital: 28 (UHF); Virtual: 2
- Branding: Telemundo; Telemundo Puerto Rico; Telenoticias (newscasts); Punto 2 (2.2); NBC Puerto Rico (2.3)

Programming
- Affiliations: 2.1: Telemundo; 2.2: Punto 2; 2.3: NBC

Ownership
- Owner: Telemundo Station Group; (Telemundo of Puerto Rico LLC)

History
- First air date: March 28, 1954
- Former channel numbers: Analog: 2 (VHF, 1954–2009)
- Former affiliations: CBS (1954–1967); Spanish Independent (1967–1986); NetSpan (1986–1987)
- Call sign meaning: Named after former sister station WKAQ (AM)

Technical information
- Licensing authority: FCC
- Facility ID: 64983
- ERP: 925 kW (main); 699 kW (auxiliary)
- HAAT: 825.9 m (2,710 ft)
- Transmitter coordinates: 18°6′47.5″N 66°3′9.3″W
- Translator(s): WTIN-TV 2.11 Ponce; WNJX-TV 2.12 Mayagüez; for others, see § Translators

Links
- Public license information: Public file; LMS
- Website: www.telemundopr.com

WKAQ-TV (channel 2) is a television station in San Juan, Puerto Rico, serving as the U.S. territory's dual Telemundo and NBC outlet. It is owned and operated by the Telemundo Station Group subsidiary of NBCUniversal. WKAQ-TV's studios are located on Avenida Franklin Roosevelt in San Juan near Hiram Bithorn Stadium, and its transmitter is located on Cerro la Santa in Cayey near the Carite State Forest.

WTIN-TV (channel 2.11) in Ponce and WNJX-TV (channel 2.12) in Mayagüez, branded on-air as Telemundo West, operate as full-time satellites of WKAQ-TV, which rebroadcast the station's programming to the southern and western regions of Puerto Rico under an affiliation agreement with Hemisphere Media Group (owner of parent station WAPA-TV, channel 4). WKAQ-TV formerly operated WOLE-TV (channel 12) in Aguadilla and WORA-TV (channel 5) in Mayagüez as satellite stations. WKAQ-TV also has three low-power translator facilities: W09AT-D in Fajardo, W28EH-D in Adjuntas and W28EQ-D in Utuado. WKAQ-TV also simulcasts the signal of New York City sister station WNBC with the branding of NBC Puerto Rico.

== History ==
WKAQ-TV, the first television station in Puerto Rico, was founded by Ángel Ramos on March 28, 1954. Ramos was also the owner of the newspaper El Mundo and Puerto Rico's first licensed radio station, WKAQ (580 AM). Initially affiliated with CBS until 1967, WKAQ-TV battled fiercely with WAPA-TV to become the highest-rated station in Puerto Rico. During the 1970s and 1980s, WKAQ-TV was a major producer of Puerto Rican Spanish soap operas and was known for its "fingers" logo. Since its spin-off in 1987, the station has branded itself as "Telemundo Puerto Rico", becoming one of Telemundo's flagship stations. Despite criticism that the station traded locally produced programming for foreign Spanish programming, it aired the first Puerto Rican written and produced telenovela in 15 years in 2006. In 2005, WKAQ-TV became a superstation when NBC Universal reformatted Telemundo Internacional into Telemundo Puerto Rico. WKAQ-TV began airing its programming in high definition on April 23, 2009. The station entered into an agreement with Hemisphere Media Group to broadcast Telemundo Puerto Rico's programming on WAPA-TV on June 28, 2019.

=== Problems and possible Telemundo integration ===
WKAQ-TV had been operated semi-independently from the Telemundo network since its inception. This allowed the station to focus on local programming, with network programming used as filler. However, declining ratings and local cancellations have led to rumors that WKAQ may become a standard Telemundo station, dropping all local programming except for Telenoticias. WKAQ's ratings declined significantly in the early 2000s due to the entrance of Univision into the Puerto Rican market. Since then, many local shows produced by WKAQ have been canceled, and the station has laid off staff. WKAQ now has very few non-news local programming remaining. Recently, the station has become the leading station on the island in terms of viewership against WLII-DT and WAPA-TV, with its telenovela block dominating in the 7 to 10 p.m. time period. Additionally, since January 2009, WKAQ has aired Lost on weeknights at 10 p.m. leading that time slot. Día a Día has seen an increase in viewership in its 11 a.m. time slot, and a local teen drama Zona Y has been successful in the teen market in Puerto Rico. WKAQ regained the rights to the local Miss Universe pageant and began airing a new gossip show called Dando Candela in January 2010. The program helped WKAQ compete with WAPA-TV's gossip show SuperXclusivo but was canceled in March 2020 due to production issues brought on by the COVID-19 pandemic.

=== Return to local programming ===
After years of struggling to compete with rival WAPA-TV and the possibility of undergoing a full integration with the mainland feed of Telemundo, WKAQ-TV has managed to return to producing local programming. As of March 2021, WKAQ-TV produces 10 1/2 hours of local programming on Mondays, Wednesdays, Thursdays and Fridays; while on Tuesdays, the station produces 12 1/2 hours of local programming. Some of the current shows include Hoy Día Puerto Rico, Día a Día, Raymond y Sus Amigos and local newscasts Telenoticias which expanded to two hours in January 2020 and positioned itself as the leading newscast in Puerto Rico beating WAPA's NotiCentro in the same timeslot.

== News operation ==
WKAQ-TV has been producing local news shows under the brand name Telenoticias since 1954. The first edition of Telenoticias was created by Evelio Otero, who proposed the name to Ángel Ramos and was approved immediately. In the 1960s, a renewed edition of Telenoticias began with different anchors.

For more than twenty years, Telenoticias had only two editions: an early evening newscast at 5 p.m. and a late evening newscast at 11 p.m. In 2002, a weekend edition was introduced, which aired at 5 and 11 p.m. like its weekday counterparts. In 2003, the station launched a weekday morning newscast called Telemundo por la Mañana with Charito Fraticelli, Silverio Pérez, Lourdes Collazo, Miguel Ramos, and panel experts.

In 2006, the station laid off 60 to 80 staffers, including some Telenoticias anchors and reporters, as part of the "NBC Universal 2.0" restructuring. As a result, the morning, midday, and weekend editions of Telenoticias were canceled. However, on January 8, 2007, Telenoticias debuted a new set, new graphics, and new music.

In 2011, NBC Universal announced that it would relaunch the 11 a.m. and weekend evening editions of Telenoticias in early 2012, as a condition by the FCC to approve the sale of a controlling stake in the company to Philadelphia-based cable provider and telecommunications company Comcast, requiring NBC Universal's NBC and Telemundo owned-and-operated stations to increase the amount of locally produced programming. In 2014, WKAQ-TV brought back the weekend newscast, which premiered on May 31 under the name Telenoticias Fin de semana.

=== Primera Pregunta con Rafael Lenín Lopez ===
On January 31, 2023, WKAQ-TV announced that the station would be shortening the 5 p.m. edition of Telenoticias from one hour to a half-hour to accommodate their new show Primera Pregunta con Rafael Lenín Lopez (First Question with Rafael Lenín Lopez). Hosted by Rafael Lenín Lopez, the show features political analysis, special interviews, and discussions of topics relevant to Puerto Ricans' daily lives. Special contributors to the show include PNP Senator Thomas Rivera Schatz, former Puerto Rican governor Alejandro García Padilla, Carlos Díaz Olivo, Luis Pabón Roca, and Anabelle Torres Colberg. Although produced by WKAQ's news department, the new show is considered a separate program from Telenoticias and airs from 5:30 p.m. onwards. The show aims to bring fresh perspectives and insightful discussions to viewers, and it is expected to be a welcome addition to WKAQ's news programming lineup.

=== Hoy Día Puerto Rico ===
In December 2020, WKAQ announced that it would be relaunching its morning news operation with the launching of a new morning program set to debut in February 2021. The morning show, named Hoy Día Puerto Rico, would have a magazine-style format and air from 8 to 10 a.m. on weekdays. Ivonne Orsini and Ramón "Gato" Sylvia Gómez, who previously worked with rival station WAPA, were announced as the hosts on January 5, 2021, while former Senator Zoe Laboy joined the show for a political analysis segment. Grenda Rivera and Elizabeth Robaina were also announced to host a news segment and a weather/traffic segment, respectively.

The first broadcast of Hoy Día Puerto Rico was on February 15, 2021, live from the Sandra Zaiter Studio at WKAQ-TV. It featured a special interview with Puerto Rican Governor Pedro Pierluisi and the introduction of special contributors Desiree Lowry and Suzette Baco. On February 3, 2023, Ramón "Gato" Gómez announced he would be leaving the show to cover the 2023 Baloncesto Superior Nacional basketball tournament as an analyst. Radio personality Jacky Fontánez was then announced as the show's new co-host.

On January 8, 2024, two new talents joined the show as hosts. Carlos McConnie and Jasond Calderón (who is also a cast member on the station's comedy show Raymond y sus Amigos) would now join Orsini, Fontánez and Noa as hosts of the show moving forward. The show also announced it would expand its run time later in the year adding a new hour of the show from 10 a.m. to 11 am. The extra hour will be called Hoy Día Puerto Rico: 10 a.m. and it will have a different set of hosts from the original 8-10 a.m. version of the show.

=== Notable current on-air staff ===
- Raymond Arrieta – Día a Día, Raymond y sus Amigos
- Carlos Díaz Olivo – political analyst
- Alexandra Fuentes – Alexandra a las 12
- Alejandro García Padilla – political analyst, Primera Pregunta
- Sylvia Gómez – reporter
- Zugey Lamela – anchor/reporter
- Desiree Lowry – collaborator, Hoy Día Puerto Rico
- René Monclova – Raymond y sus Amigos
- Ivonne Orsini – host, Hoy Día Puerto Rico
- Monica Pastrana – Raymond y sus Amigos
- Dagmar Rivera – Día a Día
- Jorge Rivera Nieves – anchor

=== Notable former on-air staff ===
- Junior Abrams
- Manuel Natal Albelo
- Efren Arroyo
- Angelique Burgos – actress and producer
- Juan Dalmau – political analyst
- Jay Fonseca
- Aníbal González Irizarry
- Carmen Jovet – reporter
- Zoe Laboy – political analyst
- Juan Manuel Lebrón
- Sunshine Logroño
- Hector Marcano
- Silverio Pérez
- Luis Raúl
- Johnny Ray Rodriguez – comedian
- Johanna Rosaly
- Antonio Sánchez
- Kobbo Santarrosa
- Thomas Rivera Schatz – political analyst, Primera Pregunta
- Alex Soto
- Ramón Enrique Torres
- Hector Travieso
- Jennifer Wolff

== Technical information ==
=== Subchannels ===
The station's signal is multiplexed:

Subchannels of WKAQ-TV
Subchannel	Res.	Short name	Programming
2.1	1080i	WKAQ-DT	Telemundo
2.2	720p	WKAQ .2	Punto 2 (Independent)
2.3	720p	NBC PR	NBC (WNBC)

Simulcast of subchannels of another station

=== Analog-to-digital conversion ===
WKAQ-TV shut down its VHF analog signal on June 12, 2009, the official date on which full-power television stations in the United States transitioned from analog to digital broadcasts under federal mandate. The station's digital signal remained on its pre-transition UHF channel 28, using virtual channel 2.

=== Translators ===
WKAQ-TV can be seen across Puerto Rico on the following stations:

City of license	Callsign	Channel
Adjuntas	W28EH-D	28.1
Fajardo	W09AT-D	9.1
Mayagüez	WNJX-TV	2.12
Ponce	WTIN-TV	2.11
Utuado	W28EQ-D	28.1

== Liberty–NBCU carriage dispute ==
On April 4, 2019, at 6 pm, NBCUniversal became involved in a retransmission consent dispute with Liberty, resulting in the removal of WKAQ-TV and NBCUniversal's cable networks from Liberty's Puerto Rico channel lineup. WKAQ and the NBCU cable networks were restored on April 7, after the two sides reached a new agreement.
