= Héctor Travieso =

Cuban actor and comedian (1943–2025)

- Born: December 1, 1943; San Antonio de los Baños, Cuba
- Died: January 6, 2025 (aged 81); Santurce, Puerto Rico
- Occupations: Actor, television host
- Years active: 1970–2019
- Television: El Show de Raymond (1998–2005); SuperXclusivo (2000–2013); La Comay (2019)

Héctor Travieso (December 1, 1943 – January 6, 2025) was a Cuban actor, comedian and television host.

Travieso immigrated to Puerto Rico and had an extensive career in telenovelas. He hosted SuperXclusivo, and La Comay serving as sidekick to the show's protagonist and puppet, La Comay. Travieso also participated briefly in "Dando Candela" by Telemundo. The comedian was part of different programs and movies for United States of America and Puerto Rico, like “El Show de Raymond” in WAPA TV. He was part of “La Guagua Aérea” and “Under Suspicion” movies. He was part of the return of "La Comay" in 2019 to Mega TV, but after a couple of months he left the project for personal reasons.

On December 29, 2024, Travieso suffered a heart attack and was admitted into Hospital Pavia, where he died eight days later, on January 6, 2025. He was 81. The January 7 airing of La Comay served as a tribute show where many clips of his acting career were shown and several of Travieso's friends shared anecdotes about him. He was honoured with one of his trademarks which consisted of La Comay asking Travieso to dance on any recurring theme by saying: Héctor, hazme el baile del... while adding any adjective to describe it and Travieso would come up with dance moves on the spot.
