= Kobbo Santarrosa =

Puerto Rican television personality

- Born: Antulio Santarrosa; 1949 (age 76–77); Mayagüez, Puerto Rico
- Other name: Kobbo
- Occupations: Television producer; puppeteer
- Years active: 1980–present
- Known for: Writer; performer; producer
- Television: X-clusivo (1995–1999); SuperXclusivo (2000–2013); A Solas Con Kobbo Santarrosa (2012); La Comay – MEGA TV (2019–2020); La Comay – TeleOnce (2021–Present)

Antulio "Kobbo" Santarrosa (born 1949 in Mayaguez, Puerto Rico) is a puppeteer, television producer, right wing commentator and author from Mayagüez, Puerto Rico. Santarrosa produces and serves as the puppeteer/host of La Comay.

The show SuperXclusivo was cancelled after being boycotted in 2012. The puppeteer returned to Puerto Rican television in January 2019 with his character La Comay by Mega TV. In 2023, Santarosa was named among media personalities that were available to receive payments in exchange for airtime to help Ricardo Rosselló while facing the backlash of Telegramgate.

== Legal issues ==
Santarrosa has been sued for defamation on several occasions. In 2002, lawyer Adolfo Krans and three of his children sued WAPA-TV and Santarrosa after alleging that the cause of his divorce was an affair in which the plaintiff had supposedly purchased an apartment, jewels and a car for his mistress. These claims were aired to the public on SuperXclusivo and the plaintiffs sent a letter to WAPA-TV president Joe Ramos requesting a retraction. On August 7, 2001, Santarrosa showed a videotape cassette and claimed, as La Comay, that the evidence was found within it, the contents were never aired.

During the trial, tapes showing the SuperXclusivo segments were shown and Santarrosa’s associate, Leopoldo Fernández III, testified that the cassette had been shown as posturing and that they never had evidence of an affair. The court granted $260,000 citing “malicious intent” behind the allegations. The Puerto Rico Court of Appeals upheld the sentence against Santarrosa, while the Puerto Rico Supreme Court denied a certiorari.

On September 16, 2009, Itzamar Peña sued Santarrosa, WAPA-TV and Héctor Travieso for expressions aired in SuperXclusivo claiming that she was expecting the child of a lover instead of her husband. In the segment aired in 2007, a man identified as “JJ” was claimed to be the real father. During the trial, Santarrosa testified that he “never doubted the integrity and matrimonial fidelity of the [plaintiff]” and admitted that the information was false. In February 2010, judge Velma González ruled against Santarrosa, WAPA-TV and Travieso reasoning that trying to litigate while possessing direct knowledge of a fabrication has been “contumacious and temerary”, imposing a sentence of $1,000,000 in damages plus legal expenses.

On July 10, 2014, Ana Cacho González sued Santarrosa and WAPA-TV for airing content related to the Murder of Lorenzo González Cacho that was defamatory and in more than one instance fabricated. The lawsuit was initially thrown out due to defects in form, but the Court of Appeals restored it citing that it had been mistakenly dismissed. Santarrosa and WAPA-TV appealed, with the court finding partial prescription of some charges.

== Personal life ==
Santarrosa has a son with Cristina María Gallart López, named Christian and born in 1987. He refused to legally recognize the child until he was ordered to do so by the court, following a child support claim that began in 1997. During the legal process, Santarrosa alleged that he had become infertile when his testicles became atrophied due to varicocele, flying in an expert witness from Denver Colorado to testify on his behalf. After three years in court, judge Janet Tomassini ordered DNA tests that returned a positive result of 99.9% in favor of Christian Santarrosa being his legitimate son. Throughout the next decade, Santarrosa remained distant to his son, barring him entrance to WAPA-TV studios, where SuperXclusivo was filmed.

He refused to pay child support and legally contested the responsibility during three years, with the court ruling in favor of Gallart and imposing a monthly payment of $1,250, which was later increased due to study and daily expenses. Starting in October 2007, Santarrosa failed to pay the child support checks of $2,750 for six consecutive months, and amassed a debt of $16,500 plus late interests. Santarrosa unsuccessfully requested to remove the judge presiding the case and was later found in contempt of the court, ultimately paying the debt and $2,000 in honoraries. Santarrosa lost an appeal to have the result overturned and after his son renounced the extended child support granted by the court, cut all ties and communication.
