= Voces en Función =

Puerto Rican singing competition

- Lou Briel on Voces en Función
- Presented by: Lou Briel
- Country of origin: Puerto Rico

Production
- Executive producer: Lou Briel
- Production location: Mayagüez, Puerto Rico

Original release
- Network: WIPR-TV WIPM-TV... TV6 and TV3
- Release: 1995 – 2001

Voces en Función (English: Voices in Performance) was a Puerto Rican singing competition series and Variety show hosted by Puerto Rican singer Lou Briel, televised from 1995 to 2001 on PBS member station WIPR-TV & WIPM-TV.

== Format ==
The potential contestants had to try out to be on the show, then the ones selected would be presented on the show with two other contestants as well, for a total of three per program and 39 for the series. A jury, composed of all-rounders, selected by cognition, would secretly vote for their favorites during 10 weeks, and choose the 20 semi-finalists. The latter would then compete again in the Semi Finals, separated in two groups of 10, for two weeks, and only 10 contestants would make it to the end.

The final gala called, Festi-Voces (Festi-Voices), would be the last one of the season, composed of 13 weeks each, and it would be broadcast in a two-hour special. The winner, would receive a trophy, a cash prize, and his or her inclusion as a regular in the following thirteen-week season, as well as performing as guest stars in several television shows produced by the station. There were 5 final galas throughout the run of the show.

Voces en Función, was one of the first Puerto Rican television shows that was broadcast via the Internet, and it also was the first television series taped on-location, at the Yagüez Theater, in Mayagüez, Puerto Rico, on a weekly basis, and furthermore the first singing contest show in Latin America, Europe, and USA, before American Idol, Operación Triunfo and Objetivo Fama.

The difference of Voces en Funcion from other singing contests, is that it was simultaneously a weekly variety show composed of various musical segments. Well known singers from the entertainment business were featured as guests stars in every show such as: Lucecita Benítez, Nydia Caro, Carmita Jiménez, Santos Colon, Marian Pabón, Danny Rivera, Son by Four, Lunna, Johnathan Dwayne, Huey Dunbar with DLG, Rey Ruiz, Millie Corretjer, Chucho Avellanet, Jyve V, Lucy Fabery, Dagmar, José Nogueras and Charytín, among others.

Lou Briel performed in a segment titled Bohemia en Función (Bohemia in Performance), accompanied by a blind guitarist from Añasco, Puerto Rico, called Roberto Rivera.

The show also featured a pop ballet, directed by the Puerto Rican choreographer Marcelino Alcalá, called Ballet Voces, (Voices Ballet). Alcalá, also choreographed for the contestants, the opening numbers for the galas, as well as various musical productions for the host, and several guest stars. He is a Professor at Conservatorio de Música de Puerto Rico.

Various notable singers that made their formal debut on Puerto Rican television through this show include Yaire, Noelia, and the local rock group Fiel a la Vega, among others.
