= Yolandita En Vivo =

Live album by Yolandita Monge
- Released: April 18, 2000
- Recorded: San Juan
- Genre: Latin pop
- Label: BMG U.S. Latin / YM Music
- Producer: Carlos 'Topy' Mamery & Tony Mojena

Yolandita Monge chronology
Yolandita (2000) (2000)	Yolandita En Vivo (2000)	Sexto Sentido (2002)

Yolandita En Vivo is the second live album by Puerto Rican singer Yolandita Monge. It was recorded live at Centro de Bellas Artes, Puerto Rico, on September 17–19, 1999, but released in 2000. This partial concert album contains several medleys of her early hits, a cover of Glenn Monroig's gay anthem "Me Dijeron"' and a duet with her daughter Paola González on the song "Sobreviviré".

This release was her last album of her recording contract under BMG U.S. Latin. The album earned Gold status and is available as a digital download at iTunes and Amazon retitled Trayectoria (En Vivo) with new cover picture and artwork.

== Track listing ==
Track	Title	Composer(s)	Original Version(s) Taken From The Album(s)	Length(s)
01	"Mala Sangre (No Podrán Conmigo)"	José María Purón	Siento	06:15
02	"Me Dijeron"	Glenn Monroig	Non Album Track Released As Radio Single	05:36
03	Medley Del Ayer (Vida, Recuérdame, Estoy Celosa, Amor Mío, Vete De Aquí, Porque Diste Vuelta A La Cara, Cierra Los Ojos Y Juntos Recordemos, Sí, Perdóname Otra Vez, Tanto Amor)	Tite Curet Alonso, Héctor Garrido, Rómulo Caicedo, Héctor Meneses, King Clave, Eduardo Franco, Yolandita Monge, Manolo De la Calva, Lou Briel	Puerto Rico's Poignant... Powerful... Incomparable..., Recuérdame, Yo Soy, Con Todo Mi Amor..!, Floreciendo!, Historia de Amour & Fantasía	09:06
04	"Como Puedes"	Las Diego	Fiebre de Luna	04:47
05	"Los Celos"	Mercy Martínez	Siento	03:30
06	"Como Lluvia De Los Cielos"	Guadalupe García, Laura Reyes	Siento	03:36
07	Medley Vivencias (Débil, Este Amor Que Hay Que Callar, Acaríciame, Quítame A Ese Hombre Del Corazón)	Rudy Pérez, Omar Sánchez, Braulio A. García, Claudio Daiano, Gian Pietro Felisatti, Lou Briel, Jorge Luis Piloto	Vivencias	07:39
08	"Sobreviviré" (Feat. Paola González)	Daniel Recalde, Rodolfo Castillo, Vlady Tosetto	Cara de Ángel	05:40
09	"Me Sorprendió La Luna"	Frank Falcón	Fiebre de Luna	05:18
10	"Medley Los Amores (El Poder Del Amor, El Amor, Cuando Termina Un Amor)	Gunther Mende, Candy DeRouge, Jennifer Rush, Mary Susan Applegate, Yolandita Monge, Lou Briel, Rafael Pérez Botija, Riccardo Cocciante	Luz de Luna & Vivencias	13:06
11	"Susususubir"	Guadalupe García, Sergio George	Mi Encuentro	04:30

== Credits and personnel ==
- Vocals: Yolandita Monge
- General Production: Carlos 'Topy' Mamery & Tony Mojena
- Executive Producer: Roberto Nogueras
- Production Manager: Bobby Martineau
- Set Decoration & Design: Rafi Claudio
- Sound: Wichie Sound, Berty Sound
- Mixing Engineer: Chris P. De Villiers
- Lighting Engineer: Fernando Aguilú
- Production Assistants: Marcos Rivera, Iván Rodríguez, Julio Ortiz
- Public Relations: Héctor Torres, Gretchen González, Zulma Santiago
- Dancers: Karen Camacho, Glinka Avilés, Moraima Serra, Mariela Bisbal, Carlos David Pérez, Carlos Hernández, Danny Lugo, Marcos Santana, Emmanuel De Jesús.
- Musical director: Miguel Rodríguez
- Guitars: Ito Serrano
- Bass: Junior Irizarry
- Drums: Pepe Jiménez
- Keyboards: Ramón Sánchez
- Percussion: Eduardo Rosado
- Piano: Alfonso Fuentes
- Chorus: Yanira Torres, Iris Martínez, Paola González, Papo Sánchez, David Pérez
- Special Appearance: Paola González ('Sobreviviré')
- Wardrobe: Roy Longsworth
- Wardrobe Assistants: Diana Vidal, Baby Rodríguez
- Hair & Make-Up: Fernando Báez
- Special Thanks: Dr. Juan Salgado, Dr. Miguel Garratón, Dr. Fernando Zalduondo
- Photography: Rafi Claudio
- Graphic Design: Juan Carlos Medina, Aparte Design

== Notes ==
- Track listing and credits from album booklet.
- Released in Cassette Format on 2000 (74321-74989-4).
- Re-released digitally by ARDC Music Division in April 2018.
- Re-released digitally by YM Music on August 10, 2018 as "Trayectoria (En Vivo)"

== Charts ==
Year	Chart	Peak
2000	Billboard Top Latin Albums	46

=== Singles Charts ===
Year	Chart	Song	Peak
2000	Billboard Latin Pop Airplay	Me Dijeron	39
