= Mis Canciones Preferidas =

Compilation album by Yolandita Monge
- Released: September 30, 1986
- Genre: Latin pop
- Label: CBS Records / Sony Music Latin
- Producer: Pepe Luis Soto, Mariano Pérez, Oscar Gómez

Yolandita Monge chronology
Luz de Luna (1985)	Mis Canciones Preferidas (1986)	Laberinto de Amor (1987)

Mis Canciones Preferidas is a compilation album by the Puerto Rican singer Yolandita Monge. It was released in 1986 and it includes selected hits from the studio albums Fantasía, Historia de Amour, Sueños, and Luz de Luna. No new songs or unreleased tracks appear here.

The album was reissued on CD again in 1992 and is currently out of print in all media formats.

== Track listing ==
Track	Title	Songwriter(s)	Arrangements	Taken From The Album
1	"El Amor"	Rafael Pérez Botija	J. A. Quintano	Luz de Luna
2	"Serás Mío"	J. Loubriel	Héctor Garrido	Historia de Amour
3	"Acéptame Como Soy"	José María Napoleón	Graham Presket	Sueños
4	"Al Ritmo De la Fantasía"	Roberto Barrera	Héctor Garrido	Fantasía
5	"Una Historia De Amor" (Cedo Para Mim)	Roberto Carlos, Erasmo Carlos, Yolandita Monge	César Gentili	Historia de Amour
6	"Sí"	Yolandita Monge	Héctor Garrido	Historia de Amour
7	"Te Veo Pasar" (Should Have Known Better)	J. Diamond, G. Lyle, María R. Ovelar	J. A. Quintana	Luz de Luna
8	"Siempre Tu"	Gianni Bella, María R. Olevar	Graham Presket	Sueños
9	"Tanto Amor"	J. Loubriel	Héctor Garrido	Fantasía
10	"La Distancia"	Anthony Ríos	Graham Presket	Sueños
11	"Como Lo Hago Yo"	Héctor Garrido	Héctor Garrido	Fantasía
12	"Perdóname Otra Vez"	Manolo De la Calva	Rafael Ferro	Historia de Amour

== Notes ==
- Vocals: Yolandita Monge
- Track listing and credits from album cover.
- Released in Cassette Format on 1986 (DIC-10433).
- Released in CD Format on 1986 (CBS-450415-2/DIDP-10698).
- Re-released in CD Format (Serie De Oro) on 1992 (CDB-80812).

== Charts ==
Year	Chart	Peak
1986	Billboard Latin Pop Albums	7
