= Zeny & Zory =

Puerto Rican musicians (born 1957)

- Born: Zenaida Beveraggi & Zoraida Beveraggi; May 12, 1957 (age 69)
- Origin: Santurce, Puerto Rico
- Genres: Pop, rock, balad
- Occupations: Singers, composers, musicians, hosts, actress
- Instruments: Vocal, guitar, piano
- Years active: 1979-present
- Website: http://www.zenyzory.com

Zeny y Zory (Zenaida Beveraggi & Zoraida Beveraggi), Las gemelas Beveraggi, (The Beveraggi twins) (born May 12, 1957), are identical twins and have performed as a pop-music duet since the age of 15.

== Early years ==
The twins were born in Santurce, Puerto Rico. In 1972, when they were 15 years old, they lied about their age to Charlie García, owner of the night club, The Wine Cellar, in order to perform in the club. Later, they performed in different night clubs in San Juan, including "La Boite Saint Michelle", "La Tasca de Hugo", and "El Barril de Vino" at the El Condado touristic area.

== Career ==
Alfred D. Herger signed them as part of the regular cast of the mid-day television musical comedy show Cambia, Cambia con Alfred, (Over and over with Alfred), on WKBM-TV, channel 11. Later that year, Zeny and Zory represented Puerto Rico in the fourth "Festival de la Voz y la Canción", (Voice and Song Festival), managed by Charlie López, and they won the First Prize Award with the song, "Así es, mi Amor", (That's the way it is, my love), composed for them by Lito Peña.

Herger produced their first album, Las Gemelas Zeny y Zory, (Zeny & Zory, the Twins), *Flamboyan FLP-335*. It was directed by the Argentinian musical arranger and pianist Zito Zelante. The album's hit single was "A La Deriva", (Drifting away), composed by Felito Felix. The album won them the Puerto Rican Grammy-equivalent, "El Agueybaná de Oro", (The Gold Agueybana), and the award as the best album of the year at the San Juan's "Festival del Disco", (Album Festival).

In 1977, they moved to Mexico City for 8 years, performing in night clubs such as El Fiesta Palace and El Marrakech. They were featured at the all-star television show Espectacular Domecq (The Domecq Spectacular), alongside James Brown, and Gloria Gaynor. During their long stay in Mexico and on later visits to that country, they shared stage with José Feliciano, Vicki Carr, La Lupe, Jon Secada, Lissette, Nelson Ned, Damaso Perez Prado, Alvaro Torres, Carmita Jiménez, Antonio Aguilar, Marco Antonio Muñiz, and Pablo Montero, among many others. They also starred in various photo romance soap operas, and at the "Palace Hotel Celebration".

In 1984, Zeny and Zory returned to Puerto Rico, singing their nation's national anthem before the December 8, 1984 world championship boxing bout between Azumah Nelson of Ghana and their compatriot Wilfredo Gómez, and recording, in 1985, their second album, Rabia, Libertad, Fantasía, (Rage, Liberty, Fantasy), *True Love, TLR-004*, produced by Lou Briel. The twins then toured Colombia, Curaçao, Ecuador, Dominican Republic, Venezuela, Mexico again, and ended up in Miami, Florida.

In 1986, Zeny & Zory were the guest stars of the song festival in Colombia, called "Festi-Buga".

== Comeback ==
In 2001, they made another comeback, performing at the Arena Pier 10 in the musical and comedy act "Bienvenidos", (Welcome). Later, Zeny y Zory, continued performing in different night-clubs throughout the island, presenting Bohemian intimate shows, alternating with several stars such as Sully Diaz, Andy Montañez, Lou Briel, Danny Rivera Jr., Chucho Avellanet, and with musical directors: Tito Vicente, Eloy Monrouzeau, and Angel "Cuco" Peña, among many others.

They returned to the record business in 2004, with the album Fuera de control (Out of Control), *GEO Music*, produced and directed in Miami, Florida by the Puerto Rican keyboardist, Amaury López.

In February 2007, they traveled to Orlando, Florida, to perform on Valentine's Day at the "Citrus Crown Ball Room", in the "Double Tree Hotel", alongside Sully Diaz, and Danny Rivera Jr.

Later, in March 2007, they were part of the star cast of the bohemia spectacle: "Concierto y Bohemia bajo las Estrellas", (Concert & Bohemia Beneath the Stars), with Lou Briel and Jose Juan Tañón, staged at Plaza Colón, in Old San Juan.

In October 2007 they were featured in the BMI Noche Bohemia Showcase in Manhattan, New York, at the S.O.B's. Club, as the closing star act. Zeny & Zory performed, singing their latest releases as songwriters. Later during this month, the Beveraggi's traveled to Mexico to open a new night club alongside Andrés García.

== See also ==
- Music of Puerto Rico
- List of Puerto Ricans
- Puerto Rican songwriters
