= Teatrimundo =

Puerto Rican children's television series

Teatrimundo was a children's television series broadcast by WKAQ-TV in Puerto Rico from 1987-1991 in the form of edutainment. It was loosely inspired by The Muppet Show. Translated in English to "Small Theater World", the Spanish title is a portmanteau of teatro (theater) and Telemundo (at the time, WKAQ-TV's cognomen).

== Overview ==
For several years, after the legendary Tío Nobel had retired, and moved to Miami, Florida, there was an empty space in children's programming at the station.

David Murphy (RIP), the president of Telemundo Puerto Rico in 1987, created a fusion between Sandra Zaiter, who had been producing and hosting her own children's show, broadcast by Rikavisión, & Lou Briel and Dagmar, who were hosts at Paquito Cordero's El Show de las 12, in the musical comedy, En Broma y en Serio, broadcast then by Telemundo Puerto Rico.

Zaiter moved to Telemundo and produced, starred, and wrote alongside Briel, this new concept in children's serials. The other members of the cast were Dagmar, as Dagmarita, a mischievous but sweet and sentimental girl, Leticia Rossy as Pollito Yito, a tall and inquisitive yellow chicken (loosely inspired by Big Bird), who believed he was Zaiter's son, and Francisco Torres, puppeteering Plumorosa, a flamboyant diva goose in pursuit of stardom, and Don Pepe, the administrator of the theater. Sandra Zaiter portrayed herself as Titi Sandra, the owner of the theater, that was also her home, and Lou Briel portrayed Lubrielito, an innocent kid whose puppy love was Dagmarita, although she only considered him as her pal.

The show aired every Saturday and Sunday at 8:00 A.M. Zaiter and Briel sought to create a new concept that could be enjoyed by young and old alike. The series skyrocketed to the 7th and 8th places in the ratings for a while. Never before, in the history of Puerto Rican television, a children's show had achieved this, competing with prime time shows.

It was divided in various segments portrayed as a sitcom, based on well written scripts, with an intrinsic message and the essence of a good ending. It was written selectively by Zaiter, Rossy, and Briel. The story alternated with cartoons that were called Teatrilladas.

Zaiter also wrote the theme song of the series, in the rap genre. The latter was acknowledged as the first rap song ever composed in Puerto Rico for a children's show.

One of the highlights was that each show featured a guest star. After the show became popular with audiences, many major celebrities were eager to perform in Teatrimundo. Lissette, Nydia Caro, Lunna, Fernando Allende, Valeria Lynch, Ednita Nazario, Wilkins, Menudo (when Ricky Martin was a member as a kid), Luis Raúl, Raymond Arrieta, Willy Chirino, and Carmita Jiménez were some of the diverse roster of guest stars that were included in the series.

The program aired locally on Telemundo, until 1991.

Later, Zaiter produced a different and cultural children's show called Telecómicas, also broadcast by WKAQ for several years.
