= Carmen Nydia Velázquez =

Puerto Rican actress

- Born: 2 October 1947 (age 78); Ponce, Puerto Rico
- Known for: Actress, comedian, singer

Carmen Nydia Velázquez (born 2 October 1947) is a Puerto Rican comedian, actress and singer. She is best known for her fictional role in the comedic duo Susa y Epifanio which has been featured in popular radio and television programs in Puerto Rico for 30 years.

== Early years ==
Carmen Nydia Velázquez was born in barrio Playa of Ponce, Puerto Rico, on 2 October 1947.

== Artistic career ==
Velázquez started her career in the 1970s as the leading singer of the Puerto Rican musical group Moliendo Vidrio, alongside Sunshine Logroño.

Presently, Velázquez alongside Victor Alicea, as Susa y Epifanio, are featured on the radio program Prende El Fogón which is broadcast weekdays at noon on WSKN-AM in San Juan, and on "El Fogón TV", telecast on Tuesdays through WORO-TV, channel 13, in Carolina.

Velázquez also performs as a singer in frequent Bohemia Spectacles, throughout Puerto Rico.

Velázquez performed for a three-month (June to September) season at the Marriott Hotel, in Condado, San Juan, Puerto Rico, in 2007, and the show was broadcast through WORO-TV, channel 13. Velazquez would perform in an event titled "Noches de Bohemia" at the Marriott Hotel in San Juan. Here she was scheduled to sing along with pianist Tito Vicente. On 21 September 2013, she made an unexpected appearance at the Día Mundial de Ponce.
