= List of Puerto Rican songwriters =

This is a list of Puerto Rican songwriters. It includes people who were born in Puerto Rico, people who are of Puerto Rican ancestry, and many long-term residents or immigrants who have made Puerto Rico their home, and who are recognized for their songwriting work. Entries are in alphabetical order by first name.

- Americo Boschetti
- Ángel "Cucco" Peña
- Antonio Cabán Vale, El Topo
- Arturo Somohano
- Bobby Capó
- Bobby Cruz
- Braulio Dueño Colón
- Carlos Ponce
- Arístides Chavier Arévalo
- Daddy Yankee
- Dräco Rosa
- Ednita Nazario
- Eladio Torres
- Elvis Crespo
- Glenn Monroig
- Gloria González
- Gustavo Laureano
- Herman Santiago
- Ignacio Peña
- Ivy Queen
- Janid
- Johnathan Dwayne
- José Feliciano
- José Miguel Class
- José Nogueras
- Jose Vazquez-Cofresi
- José Vega Santana Remi
- Juan Morel Campos
- Juan Vélez
- Julito Rodríguez
- Kany García
- Kaydean
- Lou Briel
- Lourdes Pérez
- Luis Fonsi
- Miguel Poventud
- Myrta Silva
- Nano Cabrera
- Nino Segarra
- Noel Estrada
- Obie Bermúdez
- Olga Tañón
- Omar Rodríguez-López
- Pedro Capó
- Pedro Flores
- Puchi Balseiro
- Rafael Hernández
- Rafi Escudero
- René Pérez
- Roy Brown
- Silverio Pérez
- Sunshine Logroño
- Sylvia Rexach
- Tite Curet Alonso
- Tito Auger
- Tommy Torres
- Tony Croatto
- Vicente Carattini
- Wilkins
- Yaire
- Zayra Alvarez
- Zeny & Zory
- Zoraida Santiago

== See also ==
- Music of Puerto Rico
