= Kaydean =

British-American record and TV producer

- Birth name: Stephen Phillips
- Born: 20 July; London, England
- Genres: Pop; R&B; Electronica
- Occupations: Record Producer; Composer; DJ; TV Producer; Executive Producer; Remixer
- Instrument(s): Piano, Saxophone, Clarinet, Bugle, Guitar, Drums
- Years active: 1995–present
- Labels: Kalvo Music, Handshake / Sony Music Latin
- Website: kaydean.net

Kaydean is a British-American record and TV producer, composer, DJ, record label executive and artist manager. Kaydean produces, composes and arranges music in the Dance, Electronica, Latin Pop, Contemporary R&B, and Electronica genres. Born in London, he has worked with many artists including Janet Jackson, Maxi Priest, Robyn, Man Parrish, Angel "Cucco" Peña, Baron Lopez, Raekwon, Ky-Mani Marley, Frankie Cutlass and Nocera amongst others. He is also known for discovering Latin Pop Star Janid and managing her career. He produced her Spanish album "La Magia" under the Sony Music Latin imprint label, Handshake and her Hit Single "Penicilina". In 2015 he debuted as a TV executive producer with Janid's reality show on Mega TV, Janid: Atrediva The first episode aired on 6 September 2015.

== Early life ==
Kaydean Phillips was born Stephen Ricardo Budda in London, England. When he was 2 years old, his parents married and his last name was changed to his father's last name, Phillips. However, he adopted the name Kaydean Phillips to avoid confusion with other composers with the same first name. Looking for new opportunities in America, Kaydean's family moved to the Bronx, New York when he was seven years old. A child prodigy, Kaydean mastered multiple instruments before his teens including, Drums, Saxophone, Clarinet, Piano and Bugle. His love for the piano quickly led him to land his first concert in Avery Fisher Hall in New York City.

== Career ==
Kaydean signed his first production deal at the age of 16 with Bodyrock Entertainment, EMI and eventually went on to perform with, produce, remix and tour for many notables such as Janet Jackson, Angel "Cucco" Peña, Robyn, Laura Pausini, Natalia Jimenez, Marc Anthony, Michael Stuart, Maxi Priest, Raekwon, Ky-Mani Marley, Man Parrish, Frankie Cutlass, DJ Baron Lopez, Nocera, as well as many others. Most recently, Kaydean scored a National Top 10 hit by producing Janid's hit single "Penicilina".

Besides working with artists, Kaydean has scored television series and TV and radio commercials alongside Angel "Cucco" Peña for brands such as Suzuki, Puerto Rico's Tourism Board, Puerto Rico's Board of Elections, Goya, WAPA TV, ABC-TV, and Mystic Beverages (Dr Pepper Snapple Group).

As a solo artist, Kaydean has released five independent, cross-genre albums in the New Age, Ambient, Dance, Techno and Trance genres. Most recently, he has Deejayed alone and alongside his protégé and recording artist Janid at the José Miguel Agrelot Coliseum in Puerto Rico and at Epcot Center in Florida.

== Discography ==
- A New Dawn (1999)
- Renacimiento (2000)
- Hypnotek (2000)
- Wisdom (2001)
- Tranceformed (2003)
- Emerge (2011)
- Submerge (2011)
- La Magia (2014)

== Filmography ==
Year	Title	Role	Notes
2005	El Ultimo Caso del Detective Prado	Soundtrack	Mini Series
2015	El Fondillo Maravilloso	Soundtrack	Short Film
2015	Janid: Atrediva	Executive Producer	Reality Television Series

== See also ==
- List of Puerto Ricans
- Puerto Rican songwriters
