= Jose Vazquez-Cofresi =

American conga drummer, bandleader, composer

- Born: September 18, 1975 (age 50); Biloxi, Mississippi, US
- Genres: salsa, salsa dura, son cubano, Afro-Cuban jazz
- Occupations: Musician, bandleader, composer, producer, promoter, booking agent, manager
- Instruments: Congas, drums, percussion
- Years active: 1994–present
- Labels: Salsa Dura Entertainment, Homerun Records, Caliente Productions, Universal, Handle With Care Productions, Yuniel Jimenez Records
- Formerly of: Orquesta SCC; Yuniel Jimenez Band; Los Calientes del Son

Jose Vazquez-Cofresi is an American conga drummer, bandleader, composer and producer of Puerto Rican & Italian ancestry. He is also called Manos de Hierro, literally translated ‘Iron Hands’, a name given to him by a salsa bass player. Throughout his career as a percussionist, he has played a wide variety of Latin music styles. The first composition by Vazquez-Cofresi that was featured in a movie is Sentencia, featured in the salsa movie The Big Shot Caller (2008). One of his most famous compositions is Aña Pa Mi Tambor, recorded by La Excelencia in 2009 that was featured on ZIN 33 for Zumba Fitness and So You Think You Can Dance Canada. Monday Night Football on NBC started using La Economia, another composition written by Vazquez-Cofresi for salsa dance touchdowns made by American Football star Victor Cruz while playing for the New York Giants. Vazquez-Cofresi has also been quoted and featured in various publications about the History of Salsa and his major impact in the salsa dura musical style and movement.

== Life and career ==
=== Early years ===
Vazquez-Cofresi was born in Biloxi, Mississippi while his father was stationed at Keesler Air-Force base. The last name Cofresi was once spelled Kupferschein, a noble family from Trieste, Italy given the rank of elder and hereinafter referred to as, von Kupferschein. Vazquez-Cofresi is related to the famous Puerto Rican Pirate, Roberto Cofresi through his brother Juan Francisco Cofresi Ramirez de Arellano and his grandfather; Sgt. Gilberto Cofresi was an American war hero and the recipient of the Bronze Star. As a child, Vazquez-Cofresi's mother danced traditional music from Puerto Rico and his father organized cultural activities on the military base. Vazquez-Cofresi's father moved from state to state and as a teenager the family finally settled in Birmingham, Alabama around 1991. It was there that Vazquez-Cofresi would be mentored by percussionist William “Chilly Willy” Mena. Under Mena, he received musical training in salsa, son cubano and Afro-Cuban jazz that would prepare him for a professional career in music.

=== Beginnings as a musician ===
With the skills learned from Mena, Vazquez-Cofresi would form his first band, Latin Sounds along with his sister and Alabama Jazz Hall of Fame Legend Bo Berry in Birmingham, Alabama. While attending John Carroll Catholic High School (Birmingham, Alabama), Vazquez-Cofresi was part of the school band. One day the high school percussion section was invited to attend Percussive Arts Society musicians clinic where Lalo Davila a professor of Music and Director of Percussion Studies at Middle Tennessee State University was explaining Latin Percussion. Davila who plays timbales asked if anyone played congas, Vazquez-Cofresi raised his hand and was invited to jam on stage. After the performance, Davila and others offered several music scholarships, one of these offers would take Vazquez-Cofresi to Louisiana. In 1996, Vazquez-Cofresi moved to Baton Rouge, Louisiana and created plus lead his second band, Los Calientes Del Son which included musicians attending Louisiana State University. The band would eventually record A Mi Pueblo in 1999 and catch the ear of Fania Recording Artist; Chino Rodriguez. Rodriguez would offer the band to the creator of the Fania All-Stars and Fania Records, Johnny Pacheco and composer, producer; Herman Rodriguez-Bajandas. In 2001, with a promise to sign a salsa CD recording deal with Universal Music, Vazquez-Cofresi along with other musicians from Los Calientes Del Son would move to New York City. One of his most famous compositions is Aña Pa Mi Tambor, recorded by La Excelencia in 2009 that was featured on ZIN 33 for Zumba Fitness and So You Think You Can Dance Canada.

=== Move to New York City ===
Once Vazquez-Cofresi decided to move the band to New York City, he had to hire new musicians and shorten the name to Los Calientes per the label's recommendations. After the September 11 attacks, the music scene in New York City was affected to the point that the label decided to invest in smaller acts that performed reggaetón. The band's album was shelved until 2004 when the contract ended with the label. Around the same year, Vazquez-Cofresi was working at ABC Television and playing music on the side. It was there that he would be introduced to lead-vocalist Edwin Perez (singer) who worked on a different floor for ESPN. Perez would assist Vazquez-Cofresi and other founding members to reach the next level in their musical careers. In 2005, Vazquez-Cofresi, Perez and other founding members would form Vazquez-Cofresi's third band, La Excelencia. The band would eventually record three albums that would give the group national and international success. By 2012, La Excelencia ended, but Perez had other plans and spoke to Vazquez-Cofresi about reorganizing another band out of the former members of La Excelencia.

=== The Rebirth and Other Artist ===
In 2013, Perez and Vazquez-Cofresi founded Orquesta SCC. The band would tour extensively in the United States and abroad plus release its first album named Renacimiento. By 2014, the band would release a free DVD named *Orquesta SCC (2014). Los Reyes De La Salsa Dura [The Kings of Salsa Dura].. In 2015, Vazquez-Cofresi would also work with former La Exclencia musician, Yuniel Jimenez on his solo album; Hay Gente pa' To, tour with DLG and perform on the Orquesta SCC single No Puedo Respirar.

=== Present ===
Since 1995, Vazquez-Cofresi has managed, booked and promoted multiple artist as well as his own projects on a national and international platform. In 2019, Vazquez-Cofresi created Fama Management and signed three acts; Orquesta SCC, Yuniel Jimenez and Edwin Perez (singer). Vazquez-Cofresi also continues to be active performing, recording and touring with various artists. He also gives percussion clinics and lectures on Salsa Music History with the National Council for the Traditional Arts around the United States.

== Songwriting and recordings ==
=== Notable songs ===
- "Dale (Dale Rumbero)" (Los Calientes Del Son)
- "Quisiera Tenerte " (Los Calientes Del Son)
- "La Salsa y el Guaguanco" (La Excelencia)
- "Deja de Criticar" (La Excelencia)
- "Aña Pa' Mi Tambor" (La Excelencia)
- "La Economía" (La Excelencia)
- "A Mi Estilo" (Orquesta SCC)
- "Basta Ya" (Orquesta SCC)

=== Notable albums ===
- "A Mi Pueblo" (by Los Calientes Del Son [1999])
- Salsa Con Conciencia (by La Excelencia [2006])
- Mi Tumbao Social (by La Excelencia [2009])
- Ecos Del Barrio (by La Excelencia [2012])
- Renacimiento (by Orquesta SCC [2013])

=== Film, television and radio ===
- One Life to Live TV Soap opera (ABC Television, 2008)
- So You Think You Can Dance Canada (season 2) TV Show (CTV Television Network, Week 2, Season 2 (September 1, 2009)
- La Excelencia at the Barbican TV Concert (BBC Television, 2011)
- ZIN 33 DVD (Zumba Fitness, 2011)
- Los Reyes de la Salsa Dura DVD (Salsa Dura Entertainment, 2014)
- Boardwalk Empire TV Series (HBO, Season 5, 2014)

== Performing and recording as a sideman ==
Tito Puente Jr.

- (Live Performance & Touring)

Carolina la O

- (Live Performance & Touring)

Yuniel Jimenez

- Hay Gente Pa' To' (Yuniel Jimenez Records, 2015)
- (Live Performance & Touring)

Edwin Perez Band

- (Live Performance & Touring as a Special Guest)

Dark Latin Groove

- (Live Performance & Touring)

== See also ==
- List of Puerto Ricans
- List of Puerto Rican songwriters
- Cultural diversity in Puerto Rico
