= Charlie Robles =

Puerto Rican singer, composer and actor (1943–2011)

- Born: Carlos Luis Robles González; April 15, 1943; Jayuya, Puerto Rico
- Died: February 28, 2011 (aged 67) Mayagüez, Puerto Rico
- Genres: pop-music
- Occupations: singer, composer, actor and teen-idol

Charlie Robles (April 15, 1943 – February 28, 2011), better known as Charlie Robles, was a Puerto Rican singer, composer, actor and teen-idol of the 1960s. Robles, along with others such as Chucho Avellanet, Lucecita Benitez, Julio Angel and a number of others, was considered a member of the Puerto Rican musical "Nueva Ola" ("New Wave") of that era.

== Early life ==
Robles was born in Jayuya, Puerto Rico, but as a youngster, he moved with his family to the Bronx, New York, in the United States, where he discovered a love for American rock and roll music. Robles was a fan of Elvis Presley and of Bill Haley.

At the age of 14, Robles and his family flew back to Puerto Rico, where the Robleses established themselves in the northern city of Bayamón. Robles soon started receiving musical classes from José (Pepito) Figueroa Sanabria, who would teach Robles for a period of three years. Robles hoped to become a classical music player and studied the violin.

== Career ==
Soon, Robles became a member of a musical trio named "Los Románticos" (a Puerto Rican group not to be confused with the 1980s popular band, The Romantics or with The Romancers), where he joined voices with Papo Román and with yet another "Pepito", José (Pepito) Maldonado. With "Los Románticos", Robles gained extra experience as a pop-music singer. This allowed him to be recruited, later, into a local music group named Leroy Sentiff and the Kandy Men, a band which sang at a San Juan club named "The Kandy Klub". It was at the Kandy Klub where Robles met Alfred D. Herger, who recognized the young singer's potential to become a teen idol. Herger would also later help develop the popularity of such other teen-idol acts as Julio Angel, La Pandilla and Menudo in Puerto Rico and the rest of Latin America.

By the time Herger approached Robles, not only had Robles been a member of Leroy Sentiff and the Kandy Men, but that band had changed their name to Louis Córdoba y sus Kandy Men ("Louis Córdoba and his Kandy Men") with Robles continuing on as a member, and Robles had also joined another group, named "Paul Kohen and the Society Twisters". Alfred D. Herger persisted in trying to convince Robles to switch to become a Rock en español singer, but Robles initially resisted. Eventually, however, Robles relented and he went on to record "Pequeño Diablo" ("Little Devil") and "Pequeña Dianne" ("Little Dianne"), for Herger's record label, Rico-Vox. Robles then became one of the hosts of a teen-oriented television show in Puerto Rico's television's canal 11, a program named "Teenagers' Matinee", where Robles performed, among others, songs named "Anoche no Dormi" ("Another Saturday Night", which was originally sung in English by Sam Cooke) and "Amor Universal" ("Universal Love").

His presence in the Teenagers' Matinee show enabled Robles to become a teen-idol in his home-island, alongside such contemporaries as fellow singer Diana and Chucho Avellanet.

Herger then stopped production of Teenagers' Matinee, and Robles moved on to canal 4. He also began touring.

=== Military service ===
Robles was in the Dominican Republic touring as a singer when he was drafted by the United States Army to serve, when the Vietnam War was yet not officially declared. In 1967, he reported to Fort Jackson in the U.S. state of South Carolina and completed his training at that facility. Robles was honorably discharged from the Army in 1969.

Noting that the young man was a celebrity in Puerto Rico, his superiors assigned him to a special services department. He, along with José Antonio Riós, Gregorio Huertas and Salvador Rosa Jr., made a musical group which performed for fellow Puerto Rican soldiers. Robles also became an actor, performing for soldiers at some musicals.

== Rest of career ==
Honorably discharged in 1969, Robles returned to Puerto Rico, where he faced stiff challenges from new young singers and acts in the island but, at the same time, he was able to expand his fame abroad, winning the second "Festival de la Canción Latina", celebrated in Mexico, with a song titled "Génesis". Back home, Robles participated in a show hosted by Luis Vigoreaux named "Luis Vigoreaux Presenta" and one hosted by Velda Gonzalez, "De Fiesta con Velda" ("Partying with Velda"). He also participated in a show named "Los Alegres Tres" ("The Happy Three")

In 1971, Robles reached the rare feat of obtaining both third place and first place in the same festival, when he won both places on the "III Festival de la Musica Latina", this time held in Miami, Florida, getting third place with his song "Mensaje de Dios" ("Message From God") and the top place with his song "Juan" ("John"). By then, he had signed with international record label, Velvet Records.

Robles decided to diversity in his professional life as the 1970s progressed: he became a balladeer instead, and participated in a few films as an actor. Robles appeared on Gaspar Pumarejo and Tito Rodríguez's television shows and also worked at the "Fesival de la Popularidad" ("Popularity Festival"), a show that was produced at various Puerto Rico cities. Robles acted in two well-known films, named "Fray Dollar" (1970, Puerto Rico) and "Popa Astronauta". He also became a nightclub singer and earned a living singing at many of the island's best known nightclubs of the era. However, disillusioned by the changes in popular music tastes in his home country, Robles re-emigrated to the United States during 1977, where he got a job with the American government, eventually working as a USPS mailman.

Robles tried his hand as a salsero and musical composer during the early 1980s and in his spare time was a member of a salsa music band named "Salsa Expreso" (this was a Cuban-American band, Robles was notably playing on that band despite being a non-Cuban) and he composed a number of songs.

Robles later on returned to Puerto Rico, establishing himself in the southwestern Puerto Rico city of Cabo Rojo, where he would in his later years participate in musical reunions with some of his entertainment business world friends. He was in the midst of recording a greatest hits album which was to be named "Éxitos...a Mi Manera" and which was going to include a Spanish interpretation of his of Frank Sinatra's "My Way", when he became ill with an unspecified kidney disease.

== Death ==
Robles died on February 28, 2011, at the Mayaguez Heart Clinic in Mayaguez, Puerto Rico, of a brain stroke. He was buried at the Puerto Rico National Cemetery in Bayamón, Puerto Rico.

== Personal life ==
Robles was once married to Puerto Rican singer "Lunna". The pair had a daughter, named Lisa Marie Robles.

== See also ==
- List of Puerto Ricans
