= Dagmar Rivera =

Puerto Rican actor, singer and comedian

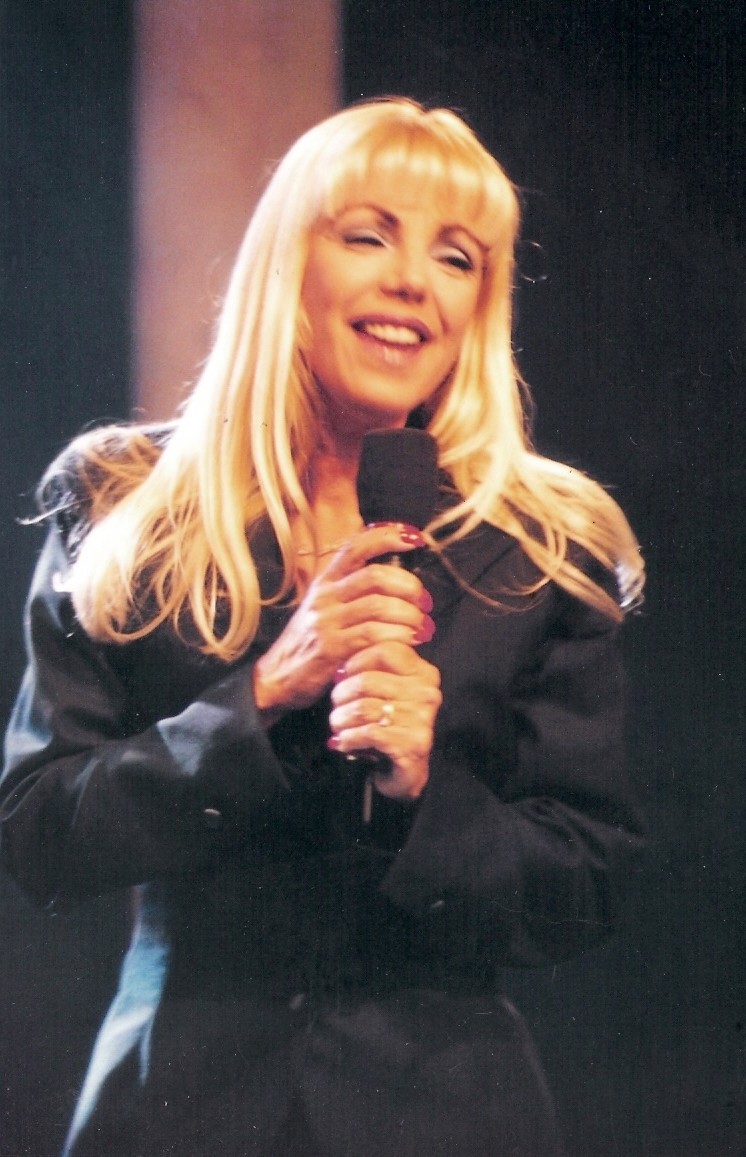
- Dagmar performing

Background information
- Born: March 24, 1955 (age 71)
- Origin: Brooklyn, New York
- Genres: Pop, Christian
- Occupations: Singer, comedian, & mc
- Instrument: Voice
- Years active: 1970s – present
- Label: Telemundo

Dagmar Rivera (born March 24, 1955), better known as Dagmar, is a Puerto Rican television host, actress and singer.

== Early years ==
Dagmar Rivera was born in Brooklyn, New York, and raised in Dorado, Puerto Rico. She started her career as a young singer in 1976. The only hit single of her first album was Soy la Mañana (I'm the Morning), by Puerto Rican composer Rafi Monclova. She was also a member of a vocal group called: Allegro alongside Tito Lara, Angel "Cuco" Peña & Lunna, among others, the gospel group: Spiritual, and the female vocal trio: The Masterpiece.

== 1970s ==
During the 1970s, she started her career as a comedian with her child role Dagmarita in the comedy series Esto No Tiene Nombre (It does not have name which is an expression in Puerto Rico used when something cannot be explained or it is absurd), broadcast by WAPA-TV. She was also a singer in a group named "Norma and the Masterpieces", along with Norma Krasinski, leter also known to Puerto Rican television viewers as "Chicola". She was also in a musical group which featured Lunna, Tito Lara, Cuco Pena and Luis Antonio Cosme, named "Allegro 72".

During the 1980s, she married Faustino García, with whom she had a son: Faustino J.R.

She was featured as a comedian in Nydia Caro's television show as Dagmarita, in Los Kakucómicos, and from 1985 to 1991, she starred alongside Lou Briel in two television shows. The musical comedy En Broma y en Serio (Joking and Seriously), and the children's television series Teatrimundo (Small Theater World), both broadcast by Telemundo. Sandra Zaiter was also featured in the latter. Years later, she was featured alongside Zaiter in Telecómicas.

== 1980s–1990s ==
As the 1980s came about, Dagmar was the host of the variety show Estudio Alegre (Cheerful Studio), in substitution of Awilda Carbia, alongside Juan Manuel Lebrón and Otilio Warrington. She was also one of the hosts of the game show Super Sabados (Super Saturdays), alongside Eddie Miró and Johanna Rosaly.

During the 1990s she hosted for several years the game show Dame un Break (Gimme a Break) broadcast originally by WAPA-TV, and later in Telemundo.

== Currently ==
Presently, Dagmar hosts the midday show Día a Día con Raymond y Dagmar, alongside Raymond Arrieta, broadcast by Telemundo.

After embracing the Christian faith, she recorded gospel songs as a soloist, in a CD called Aquí Estoy. Before that, she had recorded several gospel albums as the lead singer of the Christian group: Spiritual, with whom she performed a concert in Performing Arts Center, in Santurce.

During the month of July 2007, Dagmar, alongside Otilio Warrington, Chucho Avellanet, José Nogueras and Nano Cabrera, starred in Cosa Nuestra (Our Thing), a retrospective of Puerto Rican music and culture during the 1960s, 1970s and 1980s, at the Caguas Performing Arts Center.

During the month of October 2007, Dagmar, alongside Lou Briel, Celinés, and José Juan Tañón, starred in the unplugged concert: San Juan Se Pinta de Rosa (San Juan's Painted in Pink), dedicated to breast cancer victims, staged at the historic Casa Ashford (Ashford Home), located in the Condado tourist district.

In December 2007, Dagmar underwent major liver surgery at a hospital in San Juan which would keep her away from her broadcast duties for over a month.

On November 10, 2008, her TV producer Antonio (Tony) Mojena and fellow entertainer Raymond Arrieta interrupted their programming to announce that Dagmar would remain away from the cameras for several months while she receives chemotherapy and radiotherapy for a cancerous tumor found at the base of her tongue which does not appear to have metastasized. Competitors at other stations joined in wishing her a quick and full recovery. She returned fully recovered to the program on May 12, 2009 during a special broadcast attended by many of the nearly thirty entertainers who filled in for her, as well as Governor Luis Fortuño and First Lady Lucé Vela.

== See also ==
- List of television presenters/Puerto Rico
- List of Puerto Ricans

== Sources ==
- http://www.elnuevodia.com/diario/noticia/musica/flash/revolucion_de_la__fe/274039
- https://web.archive.org/web/20071208161413/http://www.elnuevodia.com/diario/noticia/tv/flash/dagmar_en_intensivo/326573
- http://www.primerahora.com/noticia/otros_asi/espectaculos_asi/descartado_que_padezca_de_cancer/136115
