= Rafael Pérez Perry =

Puerto Rican businessman (1911–1978)

- Rafael Pérez Perry
- Born: October 24, 1911; Guayama, Puerto Rico
- Died: May 10, 1978 (aged 66); Aguas Buenas, Puerto Rico
- Occupation: Businessman

Rafael Pérez Perry (October 24, 1911 – May 10, 1978) was a businessman and a pioneer in Puerto Rico's radio and television broadcasting industry. He owned one of the most successful radio stations on the island (WKBM AM) and in 1954 founded Puerto Rico's television Channel 11, which now is known as TeleOnce and owned and operated by Liberman Media Group.

== Early years ==
Rafael Pérez Perry was born in Guayama, Puerto Rico to a father of Spanish descent and a mother of French descent. When he was a child his family moved to New York City, where he received his primary and secondary education. He went to college after he graduated from high school and earned a degree in engineering in the field of electronics.

== Radio broadcasting pioneer ==
Pérez Perry returned to Puerto Rico in 1934 with the intention of going into business as an electronic engineer. At first he failed in his attempts because of the lack of experience and capital. However, it wasn't long before he was able to establish several radio workshops in San Juan, Rio Piedras and Santurce.

Pérez Perry was hired by the Government of Puerto Rico as a communications consultant. He founded the "Escuela del Aire" (Airwaves School) which in 1945 became the radio station known as "WIPR". His radio station was located in the Condado area of San Juan. During this time he also worked as a consulting engineer for Angel Ramos's "El Mundo Enterprises".

== Telecadena Pérez Perry ==
His radio station had its transmitters in the City of Arecibo and operated from his facilities in San Juan. Pérez Perry moved the operations of his radio broadcasting station to the City of Mayagüez and in 1954 founded "WKBM", Channel 11, his first television station. It wasn't until 1960, that the U.S. Federal Communications Commission (FCC) finally granted Pérez Perry the license to operate WKBM. In August 1960, Pérez Perry inaugurated his television station which he named "Telecadena Pérez-Perry".

Among the shows which Telecadena Pérez Perry aired throughout the years were: Se Alquilan Habitaciones, Una Hora Contigo, Tira y Tapate, Yo Soy el Gallo (with José Miguel Class), El Show de Carmita, Cita Con Las Estrellas, El Show de Lissette, El Show de Iris Chacón, El Hit del Momento, El Super Show Goya, Una Chica llamada Ivonne Coll, Cambia Cambia (with Alfred Herger), Angela Luisa Dice (with Angela Luisa and José Luis Torregrosa), Almorzando/Del Brazo (both with Ruth Fernández), La Criada Malcriada (with Norma Candal), and Mediodia Circular (with Vilma Carbia), among others. From 1965-74, Telecadena Pérez Perry aired soap operas imported from Peru's Panamericana Television.

Under Pérez Perry's leadership Channel 11 became the first television channel in Puerto Rico to present its "News" broadcast, "El 11 en Las Noticias" (11 in the News), with a journalist "panel" and a news anchor. Among the television news journalists who began their careers in Channel 11 were Silvia Gomez, Pedro Zervigon and Carmen Jovet.

== Later years ==
On May 10, 1978, Rafael Pérez Perry died from a heart attack while working on a Channel 11 transmitter at Cerro la Marquesa located in the town of Aguas Buenas. He was buried at the Buxeda Memorial Park in Río Piedras, Puerto Rico.

Pérez Perry had had three children, Papo, Icha and Ingrid. From his marriage to Zayda Ramirez de Arellano. After his death his children continued to run the operations of Pérez Perry Enterprises until 1981, when WKBM declared bankruptcy and ceased operations.

In 1986, Lorimar-Telepictures acquired the station from bankruptcy Court and changed its call sign to the current WLII. The channel was branded as "Tele Once" with a new slogan: "Tele Once… Vívelo!" (Tele Once... Live it!). It was subsequently sold to Malrite Communications Group in 1991. In 2002, Univision entered into a local marketing agreement with Raycom Media to operate WLII and WSUR-TV. At the time, WLII had a longtime local marketing agreement with another Puerto Rican station, WSTE, which Univision honored. Both WLII and WSUR-TV were sold to Univision in 2005.

== See also ==
- List of Puerto Ricans
- French immigration to Puerto Rico
- Angel Ramos
