= La Excelencia =

Salsa dura band from New York City

- Origin: New York City, U.S.
- Genres: Salsa
- Years active: 2005–2012, 2018–present
- Label: Cali York Records
- Website: laexcelencia.net

La Excelencia is a salsa dura orchestra founded 2005. The orchestra performs original salsa music influenced by the New York salsa tradition, with lyrics addressing social and political topics including immigration, labor, inequality, and Latin American identity.

The group released three studio albums between 2006 and 2012 before disbanding later that year. In 2018 the orchestra was re-formed, releasing a studio album in 2020 and is recording a fifth album for release in 2026 to mark its twentieth anniversary.

== History ==
La Excelencia was founded in New York City in 2005 by percussionists Julian Silva and Jose Vazquez-Cofresi. The orchestra was formed to perform original salsa dura compositions influenced by the socially conscious salsa movement of the 1970s.

The band's debut album, Salsa Con Conciencia, was released in 2006 on Handle With Care Productions. A second album, Mi Tumbao Social, followed in 2009. In 2012, the orchestra released its third studio album, Ecos del Barrio. Shortly afterward, the group ceased performing and disbanded.

Following the breakup, Vazquez-Cofresi and several other members formed Orquesta SCC.

In 2018, Silva reassembled the orchestra with several former members and began recording new material. The group's fourth studio album, Machete, was released in 2020.

In 2026, La Excelencia marked the twentieth anniversary of Salsa Con Conciencia with the release of an album of newly recorded versions of songs from the band's catalog. The project introduced vocalists Danny Enrique and Santy Monsalve and is produced by Silva and Grammy Award-winning producer Mr. Sonic.

== Discography ==
- Salsa Con Conciencia (2006)
- Mi Tumbao Social (2009)
- Ecos del Barrio (2012)
- Machete (2020)

== Members ==
=== Current ===
- Julian Silva – timbales, producer, composer, arranger (2005–2012; 2018–present)
- Willy Rodriguez – piano (2005–2012; 2018–present)
- Carlos Mena – bass (2025–present)
- Anthony De Leon – trombone (2021–present)
- Mike Engstrom – trombone (2010–2012; 2018–present)
- Cris Mora – trumpet (2021–present)
- Junior Ortega – trumpet (2021–present)
- Néstor Villar – bongó, cowbell (2011–2012; 2018–present)
- Nerio Matheus – congas (2022–present)
- Danny Enrique – lead vocals (2023–present)
- Santy Monsalve – lead vocals (2025–present)

=== Former ===
- Gilberto Velázquez – lead vocals (2008–2010; 2018–2025)
- Luis Arona – bass (2005–2006; 2018–2025)
- Ronald Prokopez – trombone (2005–2012; 2018–2021)
- Jonathan Powell – trumpet (2007–2012; 2018–2020)
- Jonathan Gomez – congas (2019–2020)
- Keefe Martin – trumpet (2019–2020)
- Charles Dilone – bongó, cowbell (2005–2012)
- Miki Hirose – trumpet (2007–2012)
- Jose Vazquez-Cofresi – congas, composer (2005–2012)
- Edwin Perez – vocals, composer (2005–2012)
- Junior Beltrán – background vocals (2010–2012)
- Yuniel Jiménez – tres, background vocals (2010–2012)
- Tokunori Kajiwara – trombone, arranger (2007–2012)
- Jorge Bringas – bass (2007–2012)
- Jack Davis – trombone (2005–2008)
- Sam Hoyt – trumpet (2005–2008)
- René Leslie – vocals (2005–2006)
- Hector Luis Pagán – vocals (2005–2006)
