= Tito Vicente =

- Born: Vicente O. Rivera; Ponce, Puerto Rico
- Years active: 1978-present

Tito Vicente (Vicente O. Rivera), 1959 born in Ponce, Puerto Rico, is a pianist, keyboardist, and a one man band.

== Early years ==
In 1972, at the age of 12, he started his career as a musician, playing the guitar with Los Romanos (The Romans), from Ponce. In 1974, Vicente alongside the group, participated in the Festival Cultural Puertorriqueño, (Cultural Puerto Rican Festival), in Boston, Massachusetts. As a teenager, he also played with several musical groups such as: Gente, (People) and El grupo Semillas, (The Seeds group).

== High school years ==
In 1978, while he was a senior at Ponce High School he also studied in Escuela Libre de Música Juan Morel Campos, where besides playing the piano and the guitar, he started taking saxophone and trumpet lessons. His knowledge of executing different musical instruments, led him to play the guitar, the bass, and the typical string instrument of Puerto Rico, the cuatro, for the Ponce High vocal group.

== Professional career ==
In order to attain more experience, as a many sided musician, Vicente moved to Boston, Massachusetts. He started taking advanced piano lessons with Anne Lamoure, and his apprenticeship was in such a fast pace, that in a short time, Tito became Lamoure's assistant. Later & also in Boston, he was the pianist, of the salsa orquestra, Sabor Latino, (Latin Flavor), where Domingo Quiñones was the lead singer. Subsequently, he moved to Puerto Rico, and this time established his residence in San Juan.

== Later years ==
As Tito Vicente, learned how to play various musical instruments, that led him, through modern technology ^{[further information needed]} to become a one man band. He kept on taking advanced music lessons at the Conservatorio de Música Puertorriqueña, (Puerto Rican Conservatory of Music). Simultaneously, he was working with Elin Ortiz as a music technician, playing background music for several of Ortiz’s television variety shows. His skills as a musician who plays several instruments during a solo performance, has led him to become the whole band and musical director of various singers in the island such as: Chucho Avellanet, Carmen Delia Dipini, Ruth Fernández, Lalo Rodríguez, Ismael Miranda, and mostly the multi-talented performer Carmen Nydia Velázquez, among many others. Vicente has toured internationally, including visits to Spain, (Madrid and Asturias), Italy (Milan), El Salvador (Turín), and several U.S. States including Florida, Massachusetts, California, Connecticut.

== See also ==
- Chucho Avellanet
- Ismael Miranda
