= Sandra Zaiter =

Puerto Rican entertainer (1943–2022)

- Born: November 21, 1944; Santo Domingo, Dominican Republic
- Died: September 25, 2022 (aged 77); San Juan, Puerto Rico
- Occupations: Actress; children's television host; singer; composer; athlete

Sandra Zaiter (November 21, 1944 – September 25, 2022) was a Dominican-born Puerto Rican actress, children's television show host, singer, composer and athlete.

== Early life and career ==
Zaiter was born in the Dominican Republic to Maronite Christians of Lebanese ancestry. Early in her life she participated in church groups and established her residence in Puerto Rico.

Zaiter participated in the Puerto Rican production of Arriba la Gente. Before she began her television career, Zaiter won the local OTI Festival as a composer. Her television career took off in the late 1970s when she began recording children's albums as a singer. She hosted the Puerto Rican version of Romper Room on WRIK-TV until the station closed temporarily. She later moved to WKAQ-TV where she starred, produced, wrote and hosted alongside Lou Briel and Dagmar. Together they hosted a children's show called Teatrimundo and later Telecómicas as well. She was the spokesperson for the Muscular Dystrophy Association (MDA) in Puerto Rico and a sponsor of the association's telethon. In the 1990s, Puerto Rican actress and producer Ángela Meyer wrote and produced a drama mini-series based on Zaiter's life titled Gaviota de la Esperanza (Seagull of Hope) which was broadcast by Telemundo.

Zaiter hosted a weekly show on WIPR-TV called Contra Viento y Marea (Against Wind and Tide). The show aimed to provide guidance and assistance to the disabled. Zaiter did many public appearances throughout her life and participated in the yearly presentation of the Sandra Zaiter Award to those who have distinguished themselves helping the disabled. The studio where Día a Día con Raymond y Dagmar is broadcast at WKAQ-TV in Puerto Rico is named after Zaiter ever since the premiere of the mid-day show in 2007.

== Paralyzed by accident ==
Zaiter was an experienced diver and swimmer until suffering a life-threatening accident on 13 September 1975 after misjudging the depth of the water at night. She hit her head on a rock during a dive at a beach in Cayo Icacos a small, uninhabited island off the coast of Fajardo, Puerto Rico. She was paralyzed by the accident and used a wheelchair for the rest of her life.

== See also ==
- List of television presenters
- List of composers by nationality

== Sources ==
- Zaiter, Sandra (2009). Gaviota en Vuelo... Con un ala rota. ISBN 978-1-59608-678-4.
