= Luz de Luna =

Studio album by Yolandita Monge
- Released: 1985
- Recorded: Madrid, Spain
- Genre: Latin pop
- Length: 38:29
- Label: CBS Records
- Producer: Mariano Pérez & Oscar Gómez

Yolandita Monge chronology
Sueños (1983)	Luz de Luna (1985)	Mis Canciones Preferidas (1986)

Luz de Luna (Moonlight) is the fourteenth studio album by Puerto Rican singer Yolandita Monge. It was released in 1985 and included the hits "Te Veo Pasar (Should Have Known Better)", "El Amor", "Señor...Del Pasado", and "El Poder Del Amor (The Power of Love)". Once again, the singer worked with international producers Mariano Pérez & Oscar Gómez. The album earned gold record status, making Monge the first Puerto Rican artist to have a gold record.

The release and subsequent success of Luz de Luna established Monge as one of the most important Puerto Rican artists during the 1980s and one of the greatest of all time among female voices in Latin America. Though her talent was recognized from the beginning, this album launched her super stardom, bringing countless opportunities around the world. With this production, Monge debuted with a sold-out concert at the Centro de Bellas Artes of Puerto Rico.

Monge co-wrote the track "Señor...Del Pasado" with Puerto Rican singer-songwriter Lou Briel. They also translated the song "The Power of Love" into Spanish as "El Poder Del Amor".

== Track listing ==
Track	Title	Composer(s)	Arrangements	Notes
1	"Te Veo Pasar" (Should Have Known Better)	J. Diamond, G. Lyle, María R. Ovelar	J. A. Quintana	Spanish version of I Should Have Known Better (Jim Diamond song)
2	"Por Tí, Por Él"	Mariano Pérez, María R. Olevar	Javier Lozada	
3	"El Amor"	Rafael Pérez Botija	J. A. Quintano	
4	"América"	Mariano Pérez, Rosa Girón, J. A. García Morato	J. A. Quintano	
5	"Señor...Del Pasado"	Yolandita Monge, Lou Briel	J. A. Quintano	
6	"Ya Nos Conocemos"	Mariano Pérez, María R. Olevar, Javier Losada	Javier Lozada	
7	"Estoy Enamorándome"	Mariano Pérez, J. A. García Morato, Rosa Girón	Javier Lozada	
8	"Luz De Luna"	Mariano Pérez, J. A. García Morato, Rosa Girón	Javier Lozada	
9	"El Poder Del Amor" (The Power of Love)	Gunther Mende, Candy DeRouge, Jennifer Rush, Mary Susan Applegate, Yolandita Monge, Lou Briel	Javier Lozada	Spanish version of The Power of Love (Jennifer Rush song)
10	"Cansada"	Mariano Pérez, J. A. García Morato, Carlos Gómez, María R. Olevar	J. A. Quintano	

== Credits and personnel ==
- Vocals: Yolandita Monge
- Producers: Mariano Pérez, Oscar Gómez
- Arrangements: Javier Lozada, José A. Quintano
- Drums: Antonio Moreno
- Bass: Manolo Toro
- Guitars: Rodrigo García, Rafael Martínez
- D X Y Prophet One: Javier Lozada
- Prophet 5 Emulator: José A. Quintano
- Percussion: Henry Díaz
- Pianos: Javier Lozada, José A. Quintano, María Ovelar, Amparo Rodríguez, José Flacón, Marianelli
- Sax: Tito Duarte
- Engineer: Luis Postigo
- Assistant: Jorge Gómez García
- Photography: Gabriel Suau
- Make-up: Raymond Medina
- Design: Miguel Cutillas

== Notes ==
- Track listing and credits from album cover.
- Released in Cassette Format on 1985 (DIC-10379).
- Released in CD Format on 1985 (CBS 450416-2/DIDP-10699).

== Charts ==
Chart (1986)	Peak position
US Latin Pop Albums (Billboard)	7
