= Marfil (band) =

Marfil is a Costa Rican music group.

The group's main records are "Celebrando", "Amuletos" and "Que no paren". They have toured in Europe, Latin America and the United States.

Marfil means 'Ivory', in Spanish.

== History ==
Marfil was founded as “Bocaracá” in 1969 in the Atlantic port town of Limón on the Caribbean coast of Costa Rica. Limón (and other Central American countries with Caribbean coast) is known for its Jamaican, Bahamian & Lesser Antillean heritage and reggae rhythms which had a direct influence on the sound of the band. Their sound blends reggae, soca, soul, and jazz.

It wasn’t until the 1980s decade when Marfil acquired local fame. In 1985, they released “Menealo”, which was their first commercial success. In 1987, they released their iconic song “Represento”, which became their iconic song. “Represento” was originally a Puerto Rican song composed by Lou Briel, which Marfil turned into salsa.

In 1997, the group released “Saca Boom”, one of their last commercial successes. In recent years, Lou Briel & other Puerto Rican artists claimed that Marfil’s version of “Represento” was actually plagiarized.

== Members ==
- Isidor Ash - director and guitarist
- Roberto Moscoa - percussionist and trumpeter
- Rogelio Royes - vocalist
- Omar Gauna - vocalist
- Orlando Quezada - bass
- Ricardo Espinach - drums
- Armando Conejo - keyboard
- Jose Hernandez - guitarist
