= Janid: Atrediva =

Puerto Rican documentary series

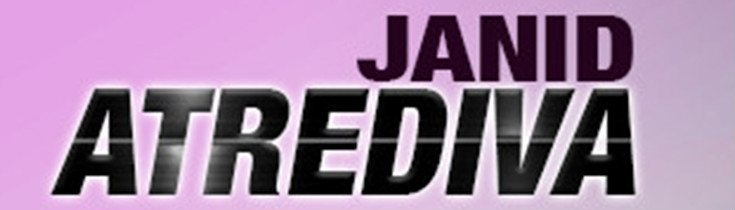
- Genre: Reality television
- Starring: Janid; Kaydean
- Country of origin: Puerto Rico
- Original languages: Spanish and English
- No. of seasons: 1
- No. of episodes: 8

Production
- Executive producers: Janid Ortiz; Kaydean Phillips
- Camera setup: Multiple
- Running time: 22 minutes
- Production company: Watermoon Entertainment

Original release
- Network: Mega TV
- Release: September 6 – November 22, 2015

Janid: Atrediva is a Puerto Rican documentary series which chronicles the ups and downs of recording artist Janid's career. The eight-part, half-hour documentary reality series debuted on September 6, 2015, on the MegaTV network. The series follows Janid and her producer and manager Kaydean after they decide to abandon their record label and pursue success in the music industry independently. It also documents the success of her hit single "Penicilina" and the process behind recording the numerous versions of the song. The show touches on Janid's struggle to stay afloat in the midst of all the challenges and obstacles she faces, her emotional issues, her love of fashion, her love life and living with endometriosis.

== Episodes ==
No.	Title	Original release date
1	"Back to the Mixing Board"	September 6, 2015
Janid is excited to work on a new album. She meets with Kaydean to discuss plans only to find out the record label is not complying with their contract. Kaydean also reveals Janid and him are in serious debt and out of budget. Janid has an emotional breakdown and turns to drinking to forget the bad news and the fact that she has to start from zero.
2	"A Shot in the Dark"	June 13, 2015
Janid is hungover and has to go into the recording studio with Kaydean to work on a new track. The process stalls when they lose electricity and Kaydean struggles to find a studio they can work out of. He calls his friends Angel Peña and DJ Nelson for help. Janid leaves and walks into a beauty salon with no appointment to get her nails done and tries to bribe a customer to give up her slot.
3	"New Beginnings"	October 11, 2015
Kaydean is able to book DJ Nelson's studio so they can work on the song "Penicilina". Janid has to stop recording due to illness and once she recovers, DJ Nelson offers her a feature with J Alvarez. Later on, Kaydean announces he is launching his own label, Kalvo Music, and that Janid will be the flagship artist.
4	"Flying High"	November 18, 2015
Janid flies to her hometown, New York City to record "Penicilina" with Bachata artist, Optimo. She then flies back to Puerto Rico to record a Salsa version at Grammy Award winner and composer Angel Peña's. Lack of sleep and exhaustion threaten Janid's success in the studio.
5	"Kill Flies with Honey"	October 25, 2015
Janid is booked to perform with Argentinian artist Fran Brunetta. Things are off to a rough start when she finds out she will be performing a song that isn't on the repertoire.
6	"Boy Shopping"	November 1, 2015
Tattoo model and singer Linda Santana and Janid share their dating stories. Janid has no interest in dating, but Linda convinces her to go boy shopping at a mixed martial arts gym.
7	"Love is not Blind"	September 15, 2015
Janid goes on a blind date and things spiral out of control when Kaydean crashes the party. She is later scheduled to rehearse with Optimo for a live performance at the José Miguel Agrelot Coliseum.
8	"The Show Must Go On"	November 22, 2015
Janid reveals the secret illness she has been battling most of her life and which threatens her performance at the José Miguel Agrelot Coliseum. Later on, she gets her 5th tattoo and takes time to find balance and rediscover her purpose.

== Broadcast history ==
The eight-part, half-hour documentary series premiered in Puerto Rico at 8:00 PM Atlantic Time Zone (AST) on September 6, 2015, on Mega TV network.

== See also ==
- List of Puerto Rican television series
