= El Mundo (Puerto Rico) =

Puerto Rican newspaper

- Type: Daily newspaper
- Format: Broadsheet
- Owner: Angel Ramos
- Editor: Puerto Rico Ilustrado, Inc.
- Founded: 1919
- Ceased publication: (paper edition) 1986
- Language: Spanish
- Headquarters: San Juan, Puerto Rico
- Website: http://www.elmundo.pr/

El Mundo (lit. 'The World') is a Puerto Rican newspaper founded in 1919 by Romualdo Real. Its slogan was "Verdad y Justicia" (Truth and Justice). In 1929, former corrector-turned-administrator Angel Ramos and journalist José Coll Vidal, bought the newspaper when Real retired. In 1944 Ramos became the sole owner of the newspaper.

== Acquisitions ==
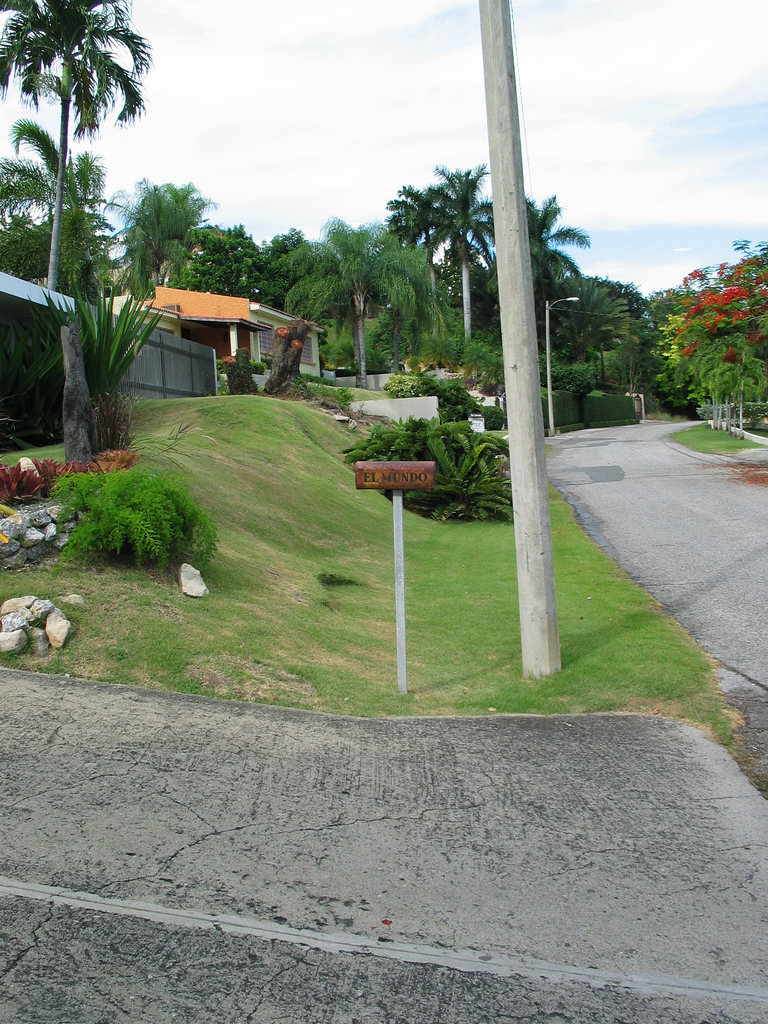
A partly oxidized El Mundo newspaper delivery box in Ponce, Puerto Rico

El Mundo acquired WKAQ AM, the oldest radio station on the island, and later added WKAQ-TV channel 2. El Mundo also established WKAQ-FM, but it is unknown if the current station at 104.7 MHz was part of the operation in the Ramos days. The paper's radio operations were owned by "El Mundo Broadcasting", and the television station was owned by Telemundo; the Telemundo name would later be used by a mainland group of stations for the namesake Telemundo network now owned by NBC Universal, which also owns WKAQ-TV.

Angel Ramos died in 1960. Upon his death, his wife, Argentina S. Hills, took over the reins of Ramos' enterprise.

== Demise ==
El Mundo newspaper was the number one newspaper in Puerto Rico for many years since its origin back in 1919. It closed in 1985, following an extremely contentious mid-seventies labor strike. El Mundo returned, headed by Mr. Hector Gonzalez as the new owner and was managed by its vice president and general manager, Mr. José Iván Aldea, as employee # 001 in the new reincarnation of the newspaper. After the first goal was achieved and one year later, El Mundo hired Mr. Sergio Camero as president to jointly run the operation with Aldea. Camero and Aldea ran the operation for some time. Mr. Sergio Camero took over the operations of "El Mundo" after Mr. Jose Ivan Aldea started the operations and launched the first edition back again on the market on January 6, 1986. Puerto Rico celebrates the Epiphany and the Three Kings Tradition. It was Mr. Jose Ivan Aldea's challenge to reopen the newspaper under new management, but much less employees and payroll by that date. After his goal was accomplished, Mr. Jose Ivan Aldea was promoted to the Central Headquarters to handle Organizations Development, Training and Finance Consulting for all of Mr. Gonzalez corporations (over twenty corporations at that time). After a couple of years of operations, the union movement came back to "El Mundo" and it was the reason for its closing later after only four years of operations under the new management. The newspaper closed a few years later plagued by union difficulties. The corporation sold its assets, and the newspaper closed operations. Many employees lost their jobs due to the union movement both at the newspaper and at the central headquarters.

== Contributors ==
- Hector Campos-Parsi
- Magali García Ramis
