= José Nogueras =

Puerto Rican musician

- Born: José Nogueras; June 18, 1951 (age 75); Mayagüez, Puerto Rico
- Genres: Salsa, Folk
- Instruments: vocals, guitar
- Years active: 1968–present
- Labels: Musica Estival, Inc.
- Website: josenogueras.com

José Nogueras (born 1951, Mayagüez, Puerto Rico) is a composer, music producer, singer, guitarist, and performer of modern-day Puerto Rican music.

== Early years ==
At the age of eight, he came to reside in the city of Río Piedras, during his school years, between the ages of 8 and 16 participating in countless musical groups.
Nogueras began composing at the age of 17 and made his professional debut with the release of Salsa Estival. Nogueras achieved success collaborating with Cheo Feliciano on "Amada Mía".

== Career ==
Nogueras' songs have also been performed by Rubén Blades, Héctor Lavoe, Gilberto Santa Rosa, Olga Tanon, Ismael Miranda, Lourdes Robles, Andy Montañez, Tito Rojas, Luis "Perico" Ortiz, Johnny Albino, and Tony Vega. In 2017 Nogueras released his salsa album called José Nogueras Con Su Salsa as a tribute to Cheo Feliciano. The album featured Feliciano himself and musical arrangements by Feliciano's musical director, Luis García.

In July 2007 he participated in "Cosa Nuestra", a retrospective of Puerto Rican music and culture from the 1960s, 1970s and 1980s, in which he performed along with Dagmar, Otilio Warrington, Nano Cabrera and Chucho Avellanet. Nogueras is still producing songs for himself and other artists.

Nogueras has established a tradition of producing a new album every Christmas season. His 39th consecutive Christmas studio album Siempre Alegre was released in December 2018. In March 2019 he released the hit "Que se vaya lo malo y Que venga lo bueno" as a duo with Gilberto Santa Rosa.

== Discography ==
- 1979 - José Nogueras
- 1981 - Salsa Estival
- 1983 - Recientemente
- 1984 - Imaginando
- 1986 - Versos de Nuestra Cultura featuring Ismael Miranda
- 1987 - Vas a vivir en mi
- 1987 - Ser Boricua Es Un Honor
- 1988 - Musica Criolla To el Año
- 1989 - Canciones De Vellonera
- 1989 - Pueblo unido
- 1991 - Mi mejor regalo
- 1994 - Tiempo nuevo

== Personal life ==
His parents are José Nogueras Chapel from the town of Añasco and Milka Vega Soto from the city of San Sebastián del Pepino, His father had an extraordinary talent for poetry.
In 2006, he received a liver transplant after suffering from acute cirrhosis and cancer, and was able to begin performing again in 2007. Over the past few years he has published two books about positive living.

== See also ==
- List of Puerto Ricans
- List of Puerto Rican songwriters
