= Ángel Ramos (industrialist) =

Puerto Rican businessman

Ángel Ramos Torres
- Born: December 3, 1902; Manatí, Puerto Rico
- Died: September 1, 1960 (aged 57); New York City, U.S.
- Occupation: Businessman

Ángel Ramos Torres (December 3, 1902 – September 1, 1960) was a Puerto Rican industrialist. He entered El Mundo during high school years as a typesetter, and went on to become the owner of the newspaper. He also founded Radio El Mundo and WKAQ-TV Telemundo.

== Early years ==
Ramos was born into a poor family in the northern town of Manatí, Puerto Rico. He was the only son born to Juan Ramón Ramos Vélez and Braulia Torres Giliberty, and only 3 years old when his father died. He was raised by his mother and an aunt, and finished his primary education. However in 1917, at age 15 years, he felt that in Manati he didn't have a future and so left his home; he then moved to San Juan, the capital city of Puerto Rico.

While living in San Juan, he went to school at the Central High School and found a job at El Mundo, a then-recently founded newspaper. He started as a typesetter. In 1924, when he was 22 years old, he was promoted to the position of administrator.

== El Mundo newspaper ==
In 1944, Ramos purchased the newspaper's holding company and thus, became the sole owner and publisher of the newspaper. He met his future wife, an Italian girl by the name of Argentina Schifano while on a business trip to New York City. After they were married, the couple continued to live in Puerto Rico where Ramos's company was based.

Ramos founded WEMB-Radio El Mundo and within a period of two years he purchased another radio station, WKAQ, thus establishing "Radio El Mundo" as the number 1 radio station in Puerto Rico which controlled 80% of the total air time.

== Telemundo ==
In 1954, Ramos founded the first Puerto Rican television station, WKAQ-TV that was transmitted through Channel 2 and which he named "Telemundo". Ramos wanted to maintain a consistent branding between his properties using the "mundo" theme ("mundo" is the Spanish word for "world"). Telemundo's first television signal was transmitted on January 28, 1954. Argentina Ramos was active in her husband's newspaper, radio and television companies.

They later set up a network in the former British colony of Guyana, though it was not particularly successful it was an indication of his ambition being carried over into those who followed in his footsteps. Sadly, they failed in their attempt because Spanish was not a common language in that country.

== Awards and recognitions ==
In 1950, Ramos was the recipient of the María Moors Cabot Award, bestowed upon him by Columbia University. That year he was also named Citizen of the Year by the Puerto Rican Institute in New York. He was the President of the Executive Committee of the Interamerican Press Society.

== Death and legacy ==
On September 1, 1960, Angel Ramos died in New York City of a intracerebral hemorrhage. His wife Argentina became the head of El Mundo Enterprises. She established the Angel Ramos Foundation, which is now the largest private philanthropic foundation in Puerto Rico. In 1963, Argentina remarried and moved to Miami, Florida. The Angel Ramos Foundation provided a matching grant of one half the construction cost of the Arecibo Observatory's visitor center which was named after Mr. Ramos.

On April 14, 1983, WKAQ-TV was sold to John Blair and Co. and in October 1987 it passed to the hands of Reliance, Inc., which owned the nationwide Spanish language television network in the United States, NetSpan; WKAQ-TV since became a part of the network, which was later renamed Telemundo after the Puerto Rican station.

== See also ==
- List of Puerto Ricans
- Rafael Perez Perry
