= Susa y Epifanio =

Puerto Rican comedy duo

Susa y Epifanio are a comedic duo of fictional characters from Puerto Rico. They hosted the radio program Prende El Fogón on WSKN-AM in San Juan, and the weekday television program El Fogón TV on WORO-DT in Carolina. They also make frequent personal appearances all through Puerto Rico and the diaspora. The duo made a cameo appearance in the 2005 feature film El Sueño del Regreso.

== Epifanio ==
Epifanio González Villamil is played by Puerto Rican comedian, special education teacher, choreographer and dancer Víctor Alicea.

=== Fictional background ===
Don Epifanio was born in Ponce, Puerto Rico sometime near 1945, and claims to having been raised in an upper class subsection of town called "La Rambla" (named after La Rambla in Barcelona). In reality, and according to their one-time producer, Luisito Vigoreaux, Don Epifanio was born on the coastal sub-section of La Guancha, which is a working-class neighborhood. Since ponceños (the inhabitants of Ponce) have a reputation for being very fond of their hometown at best –and have a rather snobbyish attitude about it at their worst– Don Epifanio considers Ponce to be heaven on Earth, and is a constant promoter of the phrase: "Ponce es Ponce y lo demás es parking" ("Ponce is Ponce, and the rest –of Puerto Rico- is parking). However, he has since reluctantly moved to Old San Juan, Puerto Rico, where he currently resides.

Epifanio is a merchant, usually owning kiosks, small eateries or clubs. Due to his age, Epifanio's hair is grey, although reportedly because of a toupée he wears to conceal his baldness. Most often he wears a red guayabera shirt with long sleeves.

=== Character's origin ===
Víctor Alicea has repeatedly stated that he mainly modeled Epifanio González Villamil after his own father, with added characteristics from daily observations of real people. The character was born within El Derecho de Lavar, a comedy spoof on a particular radio (later television) telenovela, El derecho de nacer, whose basic format has been followed as a formula for almost 70 years in Cuban, Puerto Rican, Mexican, and other Latin American media. The "Taller de Actores Puertorriqueños" (Puerto Rican Actors' Workshop), of which Alicea was a member, set up an entire story behind the parody, as to make it resemble the original but exaggerating its main story line as to make it absurd enough to have a comedy made out it.

At the initial stages of the character, Don Epifanio had a laundromat, something that was unbecoming of his avowed origins. His sister was also his partner in the laundry's administrative duties, and constantly had to bring Epifanio to his senses, since his rather caustic sense of humor and constant anger tended to rub the laundry's patrons off. Epifanio had never married and his sister was divorced (she shared a bit of his misanthropy and had a hard time having and keeping a partner). Therefore, when they once found a baby girl inside a trash can in front of their laundromat, they raised her as their "niece". The girl, Chachita, turned to be a pretty, short, shrill-voiced teenager, who befriended Papo Tennis, a tall, unemployed young man who wore basketball garb and constantly went to the Laundromat to clean his tennis shoes using the laundry's equipment. Epifanio hated Papo for many reasons: his tennis shoes would break the equipment up and Epifanio would use this as an excuse, but the real reason was their perceived social class differences. Epifanio, whose skin isn't "fair" by any means, would be openly racist towards Afro-Puerto Rican Papo. He would attempt to sabotage any of Chachita's efforts to go out with Papo, and for this he would put his considerable talent as a miser to good use. Most of these attempts would inevitably backfire (or would somehow hint Chachita of her lineage, something that, according to the story, would have to remain a secret forever given the circumstances of Chachita's adoption), and hence, would make the plot of the story each day, since "El Derecho de Lavar" was a daily 20-minute section within a daily variety show (then aired on WLUZ-TV, San Juan's former Channel 7).

The format proved to be too rigid to sustain over time, so some of the logic behind the novela spoof was relaxed in a newer inception, "Epifanio's Laundromat", which was more centered on Epifanio himself. His attempts to attract clientele and sustain the laundromat would almost always have disastrous results. The owner of WLUZ-TV, Tommy Muñiz, grew tired of the constant struggles he faced to sustain his television channel, and as a result, sold the station to foreign owners, who changed the station's format drastically. As a result, much of the station's talent (including Alicea) were forced to migrate elsewhere. Alicea then joined Luisito Vigoreaux's production company, and for close to twelve years starred in Vigoreaux's best-rated television comedies. One of these paired him with Velázquez, starting a partnership that has remained strong ever since.

=== El Viejo Daña'o ===
On the character's newer plot lines, Epifanio was still a misanthrope and was less racist than before, but would also turn out to be a geriatric sex addict, who would constantly attend the nearby "El Pocito Dulce A-Go-Go Girl Bar", and hence would almost always be broke after spending his money in lap dances or the dancers themselves. Most often than not he would befriend "La Canita", a dumb blonde stereotype character played by Puerto Rican comedian Waleska Seda, who would live off Epifanio and get him into financial trouble. This penchant for promiscuity earned Epifanio the moniker "El Viejo Daña'o" (from "dañado", which literally translates to "The Damaged Old Man"). The epithet "viejo daña'o" has since become a common synonym in Puerto Rico for "viejo verde", the Spanish phrase used to depict "dirty ol' men".

Given more physical space to act (since the WLUZ-TV's studios were rather small) Alicea then incorporated physical comedy elements to the character, some of which can be directly attributed to Groucho Marx and Charlie Chaplin, were somehow lost in the translation to Spanish of these comedians' work, and were therefore innovative in Puerto Rican comedy. Epifanio would also throw things on purpose and deliberately missing the target, a technique used by Cuban-born comedic actor Leopoldo Fernandez, Jr., who was very popular in Puerto Rico at the time.

=== ¡¡Católico y Popularrrrrrr!! ===
Epifanio would also acknowledge a stronger affiliation to the Popular Democratic Party of Puerto Rico (PPD in Spanish), to the point of becoming an unofficial symbol for the party. The character has acted as comic relief on party rallies and fundraisers, and constantly dresses in red, the party's color. Alicea, who is actually a supporter of Puerto Rican independence, again used his father as a basis for this. He builds upon the traditional loyalty of older members of the PPD to Luis Muñoz Marín, which borders in the near-religious. As a result of these cultural nuances, Epifanio would describe himself as "¡¡Católico y Popularrrrrrr!!" (Roman Catholic and PPD member), trilling the last "r" for emphasis (as the character often does). When reminded that Roman Catholics aren't supposed to be as sexually "damaged" as he is, he either changes the subject rather obviously (very rarely) or claims that there is no reason for his proclivities to impede on his affiliations.

Already militantly partial to both the PPD and his hometown of Ponce, when the mayor of Ponce, Rafael Cordero Santiago, became a strong leader of the PPD, Epifanio incorporated more references to Ponce and its mayor in his lines. He had to slightly minimize these after Cordero's untimely death from a stroke.

=== Popular y soberanista ===
After years of ambiguously identifying with the PPD as a movement instead of a political ideology, Epifanio's character sided with the soberanista faction, which in the past had included prominent Ponce Mayor, Rafael "Churumba" Cordero. This wing is considered the party's most liberal one, pursuing to promote Puerto Rico beyond territory status by replacing the current territorial clause with a pact based on the sovereignty of both Puerto Rico and the United States, while conserving some current aspects including citizenship, coin and defense. This posture was revealed while he worked as Epifanio in a play titled ¡Coge Cambio! from 2009 to 2011, and was made official with a "welcome card" issued by prominent soberanistas Carmen Yulín Cruz, Luis Vega Ramos and Carlos "Charlie" Hernández. While performing in character, Alicea became more vocal to this belief following February 2010, when an ailing William Miranda Marín, one of the most outspoken soberanistas in the history of the PPD, pronounced a speech urging all Puerto Ricans to look beyond personal interests to find the convergence needed to push Puerto Rico into the future. From this point onwards, Epifanio's posture remained clear and unchanged, even after the ¡Coge Cambio! tour had concluded.

== Susa ==
Jesusa "Susa" Cruz Avilés is played by Puerto Rican singer and comedian Carmen Nydia Velázquez.

=== Fictitional background ===
In the 1990s, Epifanio was paired with Susa Cruz, setting up a comedic duo that would greatly rely on the acknowledged sexual and political tension between the two. Jesusa Cruz Avilés was born in Las Marías, Puerto Rico. Nicknamed "Susa", she jokingly claims to be a distant relative of Tom Cruise, whose last name is a homophone of "Cruz" (and who has no relation with Puerto Rico at all). She is well known for being the best "fritolera" (fritter cook) in Puerto Rico, having a reputation for having invented the "alcapurrias bisexuales" (bisexual alcapurrias), named as such by Epifanio due to their ambiguous shape. As many cooks in rural Puerto Rican eateries do, Susa constantly wears a hair mesh.

Susa is known for being good natured, naive at times, not too-well educated (words with more than three syllables give her trouble), for speaking atrocious English, and yet for being a New Progressive Party of Puerto Rico (PNP, in Spanish) supporter (as many pro-statehood Puerto Ricans are). She is single by choice, since her standard in men have to resemble either Cruise or PNP leader Pedro Rosselló, something that is rather difficult to find in Puerto Rico. She is also a good "jíbaro" singer (which gives away on Velázquez's own talents as a singer), and is considerably more street-smart than Epifanio. Her trademark phrase is "¡Fuera, catarro!" ("Cold bug, go away!"), usually said as a wish for something unpleasant to go away (and particularly, referring to Epifanio).

== Character portrayal ==
=== Mutual relationship ===
Susa somehow manages to continue a business relationship with Epifanio, who has always been abusive towards her. At the beginning, he was blatantly racist against Susa (due to her darker skin color), and called her a "monita" (monkey). Audience protests and complaints from Afro-Puerto Rican community leaders have only diminished Epifanio's rants, and he blames her troubles on her being "prieta, bruta y penepé" (black, dumb and PNP member). Susa almost always counters this by hitting Epifanio with her by-now legendary handbag when insulted, something that inevitably causes Epifanio considerable physical pain.

Later on, Epifanio became an occasional sexual harasser of Susa's, parodying Puerto Rican relatively lax community standards on the practice. Her mild (and sometimes supportive) reaction towards this somehow hinted that she had at least a passing physical attraction towards Epifanio. Epifanio would constantly make passes at her, asking her to join him at "las latas" ("the cans", or warehouse space, at the back of his establishments), and pinching her, to the battle cry of "¡Te picó el juey!" ("The crab just pinched you!"). She would then either verbally humiliate him in front of other people as retaliation, or would physically assault him to keep him at bay. At times, though, sparks would fly between the two, something which they would deny when asked about it.

Somehow this blatantly antagonistic relationship would be sustained without either deteriorating further (or being consummated sexually, on the other hand) over their mutual programs' seasons. Susa would actually attempt to bring some sense into Epifanio's financial and personal life, with very little success. Epifanio would then claim he needed Susa, at least as a verbal target.

Puerto Rican disc-jockey and television presenter Antonio Sánchez, "El Gangster", would make constant reference to a fabled (some say infamous) motel in Caguas, Puerto Rico, "La Hamaca" ("The Hammock") in his radio and television programs. Some television comedy characters in Puerto Rico would make occasional references to La Hamaca, and as a consequence of this, a vaudeville comedy play, called "Amor en La Hamaca" was written and produced (by Vigoreaux and his partners) to capitalize on the reference. The first installment of the play was successful, and a second run, having little to do with the first play, was written with Susa and Epifanio in mind. This would make good use of Velázquez's singing and Alicea's dancing skills (he was a choreographer for Iris Chacón once). In it, Susa and Epifanio would at last consummate their physical relationship, not without some absurd situations thrown in for comedy. "Amor en La Hamaca II" would become the longest-running play in Puerto Rican history, playing over 4 1/2 consecutive years. After their "night at the latas", Susa and Epifanio would hint on having had additional nights together, but would tend to be discreet about it (or at least Susa was; Epifanio would give away details to her sheer horror).

While acting as Epifanio, Alicea has become a constant promoter of Puerto Rican artists and acts, covering the full spectre of the Puerto Rican humanities' scene. He now voices his political opinions openly and vehemently, championing animal rights, drama and music classes on Puerto Rican public schools, gay and lesbian rights, better living conditions for the elderly, the HIV positive and children, and other liberal causes. This has somehow rehabilitated Epifanio's image among Puerto Ricans, dismissing his "viejo daña'o" antics in favor of a more tolerant, less grumpy image. He still uses risqué humor to refer to women he physically likes, which he calls "potrancas" (young mares), and make the occasional pass to Susa.

== Radio and television program runs ==
Susa and Epifanio would star in various inceptions of their show on Puerto Rican television: "Susa y Epifanio", "La Taberna Budweiser", "El Kiosco Budweiser" and "Café Teatro El Fogón", over various Puerto Rican television stations. They would also be featured constantly in Puerto Rican patron saint feasts, honoring the founding of each of the island nation's municipalities. On their live shows they would sing parodies of Puerto Rican song standards ridiculing each other, and would make fun of each other, particularly over that fateful night at "La Hamaca". They have also recorded a Christmas record together.

Velázquez tried her hand at entrepreneurship, and opened a night club in Bayamón, Puerto Rico; she would try to cater to every segment of the local market: from family comedy afternoons on Sundays to male stripper shows on Tuesdays. Susa Cruz would sometimes guest on some of the shows. The night club was forced to close after four months due to licensing restrictions (and some controversy from the club's neighbors). When most Puerto Rican television stations opted to reduce local programming in favor of syndicated shows produced elsewhere, Alicea and Velázquez started a radio program, "Prende El Fogón", on WSKN-AM (later moved to WIAC-AM). On this program they would comment the news (Susa would sometimes sing a décima commenting a particular item), and open the phone lines. Susa and Epifanio would ridicule each other's political views, but more often they would ridicule the Puerto Rican political scene, something they claim would fit right into Gabriel García Márquez's fictional town of Macondo in his book One Hundred Years of Solitude. The program has proven to be an audience favorite. It also opened a community service vehicle for Alicea and Velázquez, and particularly for Alicea. Susa and Epifanio have also taken their "Fogón" format into television. On their current television program, "El Fogón TV", they attempt to interview political figures using humor to disarm them. Puerto Rican governor Aníbal Acevedo Vilá was their first guest. Susa and Epifanio have also recorded various radio and television advertisements, particularly for products and services catering to the aged, including supplementary health plans and audiology services.
