= Johnathan Dwayne =

Indian musician (born 1963)

- Born: July 31, 1963 (age 62); San Juan, Puerto Rico
- Genres: art rock
- Occupations: Musician, composer, and artist
- Years active: 1980s-present

Johnatan Dwayne (born July 31, 1963) is a musician, composer, and artist who introduced the musical concept of art rock into Puerto Rico.

== Early years ==
Dwayne was born in San Juan, Puerto Rico the capital city of the island. In the 1980s he belonged to the musical group Words Four Two, singing lead and composing. The dominating musical styles in Puerto Rico at this time were Salsa and Merengue, but the group's release of "Somethin' in the Air" was a hit, and made Art Rock a competing style; this song was followed by "Society Killed by Who".

External audio
- You may listen to Johnathan Dwayne as the lead singer for the group "Words Four Two" sing "Society Killed by Who" here.

In 1991, after the group broke up, Dwayne composed for others, creating the Spanish version of "Pocket" for Ednita Nazario, and "Metamorfosis". His first gold record as composer was for "Un Corazon Hecho Pedazos" (meaning "A Heart Broken to Pieces"). He won the Tu Musica Award and also an award from Billboard and ASCAP. Nazario's recording of his "Pasiones" ("Passions") went platinum. Commissions followed from additional Puerto Rican singers, including Lunna and Jailene Cintrón. Dwayne won the Silver Ermita award, in Colombia, as a vocal soloist. Two of Dwayne's works as a painter, Personajes and Ser es des Nudos, have been exhibited in various expositions.

== Acting career ==
In 2000, he made his debut as actor in the soap opera Hombres de Honor (Men of Honor). He has participated in over 20 soap operas so far. In 2004, he made his American stage debut in Washington, D.C., as Don Luis in Pedro Calderón de la Barca's La Dama Duende ("The Elf Lady"). One of the outfits worn by Dwayne during his days as a member of the group Word Four Two is currently on display at the Hard Rock Cafe in Old San Juan.

== See also ==
- List of Puerto Ricans
- List of Puerto Rican songwriters
