= Fantasía (Yolandita Monge album) =

Fantasia

Studio album by Yolandita Monge
- Released: 1980
- Recorded: San Juan & New York
- Genre: Latin pop
- Label: CBS Records / Sony Music Latin
- Producer: Pepe Luis Soto

Yolandita Monge chronology
Estilo y Personalidad (1979)	Fantasia (1980)	Historia de Amour (1981)

Fantasia (Fantasy) is the eleventh (11th) studio album by Puerto Rican singer Yolandita Monge. It was the first release of the singer under her recording contract with the international label CBS Records, now Sony Music Latin. This album was released in 1980 and includes the radio hits "Tanto Amor", "Como Lo Hago Yo", and "Al Ritmo De la Fantasía".

It was re-issued on CD format in 1992 and is currently out of print in all formats. Several hits songs appear in various compilations of the singer available as digital downloads at iTunes and Amazon.

== Track listing ==
Track	Title	Composer(s)	Arranger & Musical Director
1	"Cambiando La Rutina De Vivir"	Rodolfo Barrera	Héctor Garrido
2	"Te Digo Adiós"	Rodolfo Barrera	Héctor Garrido
3	"Tanto Amor"	Lou Briel	Héctor Garrido
4	"Al Ritmo De La Fantasía"	Rodolfo Barrera	Héctor Garrido
5	"Como Lo Hago Yo"	Héctor Garrido	Héctor Garrido
6	"El Mundo Al Revés"	Rodolfo Barrera	Héctor Garrido
7	"Y Yo Te Amaba"	Rodolfo Barrera	Héctor Garrido
8	"Espacio Negativo"	Rodolfo Barrera	Héctor Garrido
9	"Piensa Amor"	K. Mendoza	Héctor Garrido

== Credits and personnel ==
- Vocals: Yolandita Monge
- Musical Direction & Arrangements: Héctor Garrido
- Recording Engineers: Eddie Trabanco, Vern Carlson, Jack Sherdel
- Mixing Engineer: Jack Sherdel
- Editorial: Costa Brava Music, Inc. (BMI)
- Photography: Joche Dávila
- Make-up: Gary Bernford
- Stylist: Max
- Art: Drago

== Notes ==
- Track listing and credits from album cover.
- Released in Cassette Format on 1986 (DKC-10468).
- Released in CD Format (Serie De Oro) on 1992 (CDB-80745).
