= Historia de Amour =

Historia De Amour

Studio album by Yolandita Monge
- Released: 1981
- Recorded: San Juan & New York
- Genre: Latin Pop
- Label: CBS Records / Sony Music Latin
- Producer: Pepe Luis Soto

Yolandita Monge chronology
Fantasia (1980)	Historia De Amour (1981)	Sueños (1983)

Historia de Amour (History of Love) is Yolandita Monge's twelfth (12th) studio album and second with CBS Records (now Sony Music Latin). It follows the same formula of her previous release and includes the hits "Serás Mío", "Perdóname Otra Vez", "Que Te Hice", and "Sí". Monge won the Buga Festival in Colombia for composing and performing the song "Sí".

The album was re-issued on CD format in 1992 and it is currently out of print in all media formats. Several hits songs appear in various compilations of the singer available as digital downloads at iTunes and Amazon.

== Track listing ==
Track	Title	Composer(s)	Arrangements
1	"Una Historia De Amor" (Cedo Para Mi)	Roberto Carlos, Erasmo Carlos, Yolandita Monge	César Gentili
2	"Que Te Hice"	J.L. Martini	Héctor Garrido
3	"Hoy Te Esperaré"	Armando Manzanero	Rafael Ferro
4	"Vive Tu Vida"	Lou Briel	Héctor Garrido
5	"Levanto Mi Copa"	Sarita Medina	Héctor Garrido
6	"Sí"	Yolandita Monge	Héctor Garrido
7	"Recuerdos" (Lembrancas)	Roberto Carlos, Erasmo Carlos, Yolandita Monge	César Gentili
8	"Serás Mío"	Lou Briel	Héctor Garrido
9	"Perdóname Otra Vez"	Manolo De la Calva	Rafael Ferro

== Credits and personnel ==
- Vocals: Yolandita Monge
- String Arrangements & Orchestral Direction: Héctor Garrido
- Artistic Repertoire Coordinator: Sergio Rozenblat
- Sound Engineers: Jack Sherdel, Eddie Trabanco, Steve Bravin
- Mixing Engineer: Jack Sherdel
- Photography: Lee Marshall
- Make-up: Jane Pittman

== Notes ==
- Track listing and credits from album cover.
- Released in Cassette Format on 1986 (DKC-10467).
- Released in CD Format (Serie De Oro) on 1992 (CDB-80743).
