= Sueños (Yolandita Monge album) =

Studio album by Yolandita Monge
- Released: 1983
- Recorded: London & Madrid
- Genre: Latin Pop
- Label: CBS Records / Sony Music Latin
- Producer: Oscar Gómez & Mariano Pérez

Yolandita Monge chronology
Historia de Amour (1981)	Sueños (1983)	Luz de Luna (1985)

Sueños (Dreams) is Yolandita Monge's thirteenth (13th) studio album and third with CBS Records (now Sony Music Latin). It includes the hits "Sola", "Siempre Tú", "La Distancia", "Acéptame como Soy", "El Amor", and the title track. This album marked a change for a more contemporary pop sound for the singer, along with a change of image. For this release, Monge worked with international producers of the likes of Oscar Gómez & Mariano Pérez, in an effort to market the singer outside of Puerto Rico.

This release marked an important transition in the career of Yolandita Monge. So far all her records had maintained a similar musical concept and arrangements. However, with this production the singer launched a new, fresh and modern international pop sound that served as the preamble to the "boom" that broke out with her next album, Luz de Luna. This production also marked her foray into dance pop and the first of several radical image make-overs that would place her at the forefront of fashion trends in Puerto Rico.

The album was re-issued on CD format in 1993 and is currently out of print in all media formats. Several hits songs appear in various compilations of the singer available as digital downloads at iTunes and Amazon.

== Track listing ==
Track	Title	Songwriter(s)	Arrangements
1	"Sola"	O. Avogadro, M. Lavezzi, J.A. García Morato	Javier Lozada
2	"Siempre Tú"	Gianni Bella, María R. Olevar	Graham Presket
3	"El Amor"	Mariano Pérez, Carlos Gómez, María R. Olevar	Graham Presket
4	"Dime Que No"	María R. Olevar	Javier Lozada
5	"La Distancia"	Anthony Ríos	Graham Presket
6	"Sueños"	Mariano Pérez, Javier Lozada, María R. Olevar	Graham Presket
7	"Roma"	Golzi, Marrale, J.A. García Morato	Javier Lozada
8	"Bah!"	Mariano Pérez, Javier Lozada, María R. Olevar	Javier Lozada
9	"Acéptame Como Soy"	José María Napoleón	Graham Presket
10	"Crisálida"	Anthony Ríos	Javier Lozada

== Credits and personnel ==
- Vocals: Yolandita Monge
- Producers: Oscar Gómez, Mariano Pérez
- Arrangements: Javier Lozada, Graham Presket
- Drums: Bret Morgan
- Bass: Paul Jones
- Guitars: Chris Rea, Ray Russell, Nigel Jenkins, Rodrigo
- Piano: Javier Lozada, Graham Presket
- Percussion: Henry Díaz
- P.P.G.: Javier Lozada
- Prophet 10: Javier Lozada, Graham Presket
- Prophet One: Javier Lozada
- Rolland: Mariano Pérez
- Engineers: Gary Shutton, Luis Galleja
- Chorus: María Ovelar, Sol Tate, José Falcón, Javier Lozada, Marianelli
- Wardrobe: Coral Boutique
- Makeup: Raymond Medina
- Photography: Al Freddy

== Notes ==
- Track listing and credits from album cover.
- Released in Cassette Format on 1983 (DIC-10345).
- Released in CD Format (Serie De Oro) on 1993 (CDB-81002/2-469573).
