= El derecho de nacer =

El derecho de nacer ("The right to be born") may refer to:

- El derecho de nacer (radionovela), a radionovela (radioplay) by Félix B. Caignet
- El derecho de nacer (film), a 1952 film
- El derecho de nacer (1959 telenovela), made in Puerto Rico, starring Helena Montalban and Braulio Castillo
- El derecho de nacer, made in Perú, starring Sylvia Vegas and Miguel Arnaiz
- El derecho de nacer (1965 telenovela), a 1965 telenovela with Conchita Obach by RCTV
- El derecho de nacer (1966 TV series), a Mexican telenovela
- El derecho de nacer (1981 TV series), a telenovela with Verónica Castro
- El derecho de nacer (2001 TV series), a telenovela with Kate del Castillo

== See also ==
- es:El derecho de nacer, a more extensive list in Spanish Wikipedia
