= Janid =

American singer

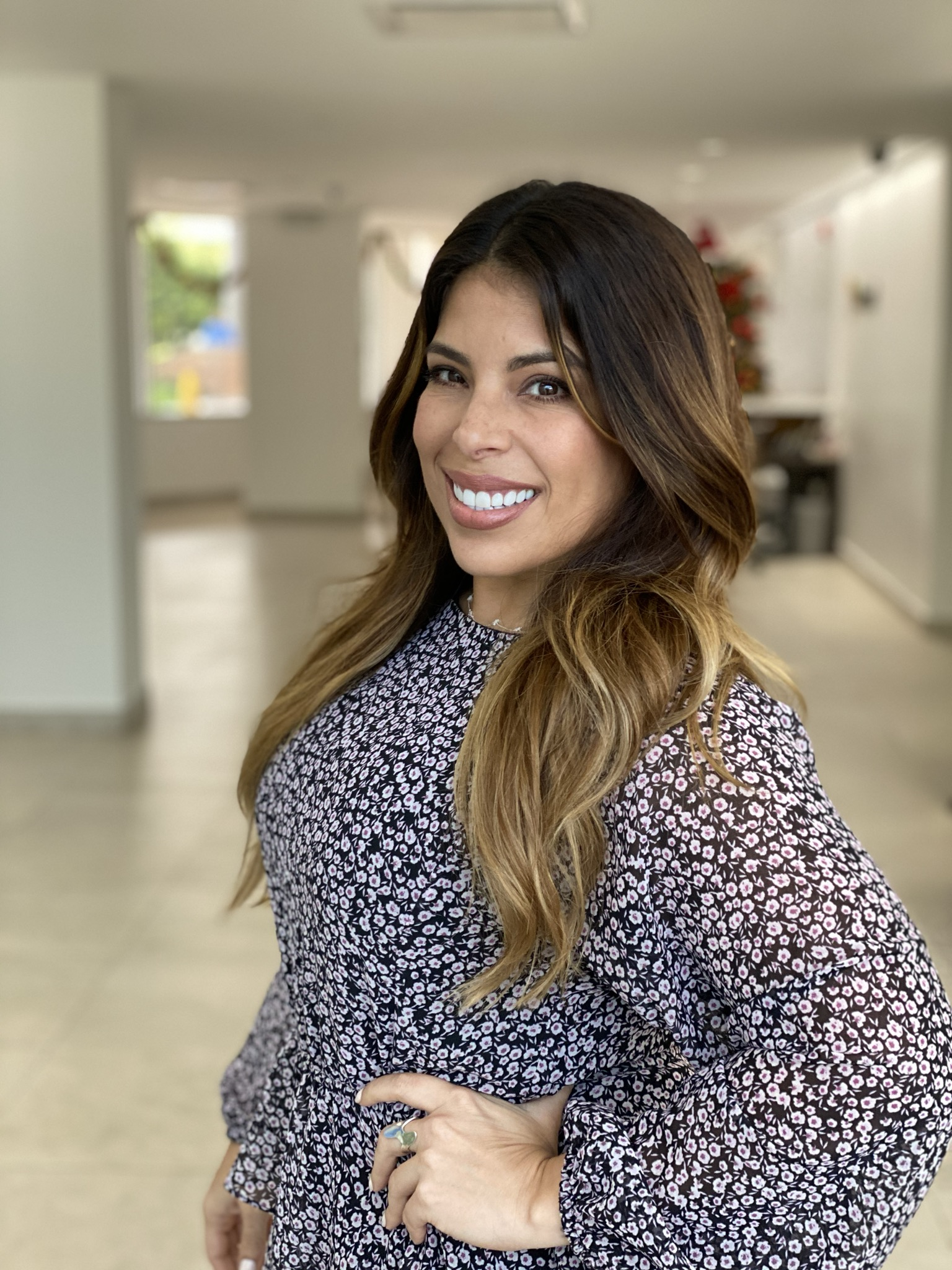
- Janid in San Juan, Puerto Rico, 2019

Background information
- Born: Janid Ortiz; December 15; New York, New York, US
- Origin: Puerto Rico
- Genres: Latin; pop; R&B; electronica
- Occupations: Singer; actress; model
- Instrument: Vocals
- Labels: Kalvo Music; Handshake / Sony Music Latin

Janid Ortiz, known as Janid, is an American singer, actress and reality TV star. Musically, she lies between Latin pop, contemporary R&B, and electronica genres. Born in New York City and raised in Puerto Rico, she first began to gain recognition in 2014 when she released her Spanish album La Magia under the Sony Music Latin imprint label, Handshake.

In the summer of 2015 she rose to fame when she released the single "Penicilina" under the independent label Kalvo Music, featuring versions in contemporary R&B produced by Kaydean, a Reggaeton remix by DJ Nelson featuring J Alvarez, a Bachata version featuring Optimo, and a Salsa version produced by Angel "Cucco" Peña featuring NG2. "Penicilina" peaked at No. 25 on the Tropical Billboard chart, No. 6 in Puerto Rico and No. 2 in the Dominican Republic.

The popularity gained from "Penicilina" earned Janid her own reality show on Mega TV, Janid: Atrediva. The first episode aired on September 6, 2015.

== Early life ==
Janid was born into a musical family. From an early age she took ballet, singing and piano lessons. She joined her school choir and later moved to South Carolina where she joined a gospel choir. She appeared in many jingles, radio station IDs and TV commercials before she started focusing on a career as a solo artist. She has cited Tina Turner, Donna Summer, Aretha Franklin, Grace Jones, La Lupe, Sia, Draco Rosa and Ednita Nazario as her musical influences.

== Career ==
Janid moved back to New York City in 2005 where she spent many years in Queens developing her style. During her time in New York she released a handful of independent albums that failed to achieve commercial success. She performed at several venues from dive bars to Webster Hall, and she performed twice at the Puerto Rican Day Parade.

Janid has collaborated with many renowned artists including Frankie Cutlass, Michael Stuart and DJ Baron Lopez. She performed in Arthur Hanlon's Encanto del Caribe TV special alongside Marc Anthony, Laura Pausini, Natalia Jiménez, Cheo Feliciano and Bernie Williams.

== Discography ==
- Goddess (2006)
- ONE (2007)
- Twisted (2009)
- Alias (2010)
- Más Allá de Andrómeda (2012)
- La Magia (2014)
- Penicilina EP written by Rey Severo & Gran Omar (2015)

== Filmography ==
Year	Title	Role	Notes
2005	El Ultimo Caso del Detective Prado	Soundtrack	Mini series
2015	El Fondillo Maravilloso	Herself	Short film
2015	Janid: Atrediva	Herself	Reality television series
2016	Start Up	Bar Crowd	Crackle television series
2017	La Academia	Agent Ortiz	Television series

== See also ==
- List of Puerto Ricans
- Puerto Rican songwriters
