= José Miguel Class =

Puerto Rican musician

- Born: September 26, 1935; Manatí, Puerto Rico
- Died: April 13, 2017 (aged 81); Hato Rey, Puerto Rico
- Occupation: Singer

José Miguel Class Ponce (September 26, 1935 – April 13, 2017) was a Puerto Rican singer who garnered international fame during the 1960s and 1970s.

== Biography ==
Nicknamed "El Gallito de Manatí" ("Manati's Bantam"), Class achieved fame in Puerto Rico in the 1960s before moving to Mexico, where he achieved wide success. His period as a resident there proved important for his career: He released various Mexican music albums and he was able to achieve fame across Central America, South America and the rest of the Caribbean.

When Class returned to Puerto Rico during the decade of the '70s, he immediately landed a weekly television show in Rafael Perez Perry's Channel 11, which he co-hosted with Awilda (Awilda La Mimosa) Pedrosa. His adopted Mexican accent was noticeable during the run of this show; as a matter of a fact, he kept the Mexican accent for a very long time. His catchphrase was "Yo soy el Gallo!" ("I am the Rooster!") He retired to his hometown of Manati. He released over 20 albums, many of which have been converted into CD format.

== Death ==
Class died on the morning of April 13, 2017, aged 81 following a long illness at Auxilio Mutuo Hospital in Hato Rey, Puerto Rico.

== Selected discography ==
Singles

Nuestro Pan De Cada Dia

- "Despedida", written by Jose Manuel "Taty" Calderón Hernandez.

== See also ==
- List of Puerto Ricans
- List of Puerto Rican songwriters
- Irish immigration to Puerto Rico
