= Arturo Somohano =

Puerto Rican musician

Arturo Somohano Portela
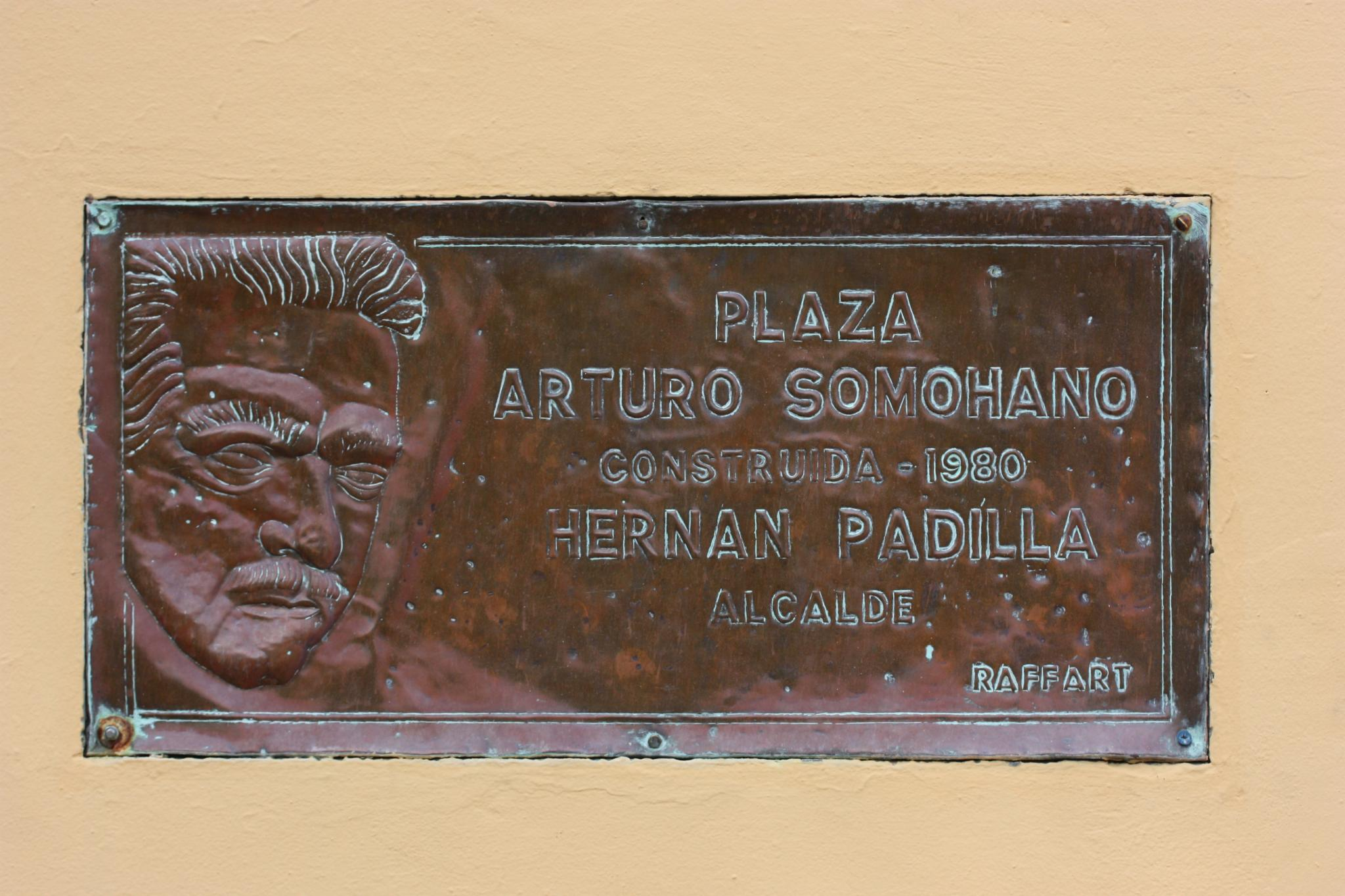
- Plaque at Plaza Arturo Somohano in San Juan

Background information
- Born: September 1, 1910; San Juan, Puerto Rico
- Died: March 23, 1977; Hato Rey, Puerto Rico
- Genres: Classical music
- Occupation: Director of the San Juan Symphony Orchestra

Arturo Somohano Portela (September 1, 1910 – March 23, 1977) was a musical composer and director of the San Juan Symphony Orchestra, which is now named after him.

== Early years ==
Somohano, born in San Juan, Puerto Rico, had always been musically inclined and as a young child had learned to play the piano. He loved classical music and when he learned musical composition and harmony at the Fransician Chapel, he felt inspired to write music in a classical style.

== San Juan Symphony Orchestra ==
Upon the outbreak of World War II, Somohano entertained U.S. Army troops by playing the piano and directing concerts at various military bases. His composition, "Canciones de las Americas" (Songs of the Americas), became an iconic anthem in the Army. After the war, Somohano returned to Puerto Rico, where he founded and directed the San Juan Symphony Orchestra and the Puerto Rico Philharmonic Orchestra. During this period, he also spearheaded the reconstruction of the Tapia Theater in San Juan, which was in a state of disrepair.

By 1958, as Somohano's reputation as a conductor grew, so did the overseas demand for his services as an orchestra conductor. He did two tours which included presentations in Spain, Germany, and the United States.

Somohano celebrated his 100th concert as director in the 1960s in Madrid, Spain. He was granted the Order of Isabella the Catholic by the Spanish Parliament and was named Honorary Conductor of the Madrid Symphony Orchestra. On January 13, 1969, Somohano was sworn in as an Assembly Member of the City of San Juan.

== Published the works ==
External audio
- You may listen to"Arturo Somohano's "Dime" interpreted by Rene Ramos". Archived from the original on 2009-10-27.

Somohano published the works of danza composers Manuel Gregorio Tavárez and Juan Morel Campos. He also wrote the forwards for three musical reviews and the musical accompaniment for five theatrical works with the collaboration of Manuel Méndez Ballester.

Amongst his compositions are:

- "Recuerdos de Ponce" (Memories of Ponce),
- "Si Tu Supieras" (If You Only Knew),
- "Palma y Olivo" (Palms and Olives),
- "Esclavo Moderno" (Modern Slave) and
- "Vagando".

He also recorded many other compositions, including:

- "Danzas de Puerto Rico" (Danzas of Puerto Rico),
- "Aquí España" (Over Here, Spain) and
- "En Mi Viejo San Juan" (In My Old San Juan).

== Legacy ==
Arturo Somohano died in Hato Rey, Puerto Rico on March 23, 1977. After his death, the San Juan Symphony Orchestra was renamed The Arturo Somohano Symphony Orchestra in his honor. The Conservatory of Music of Puerto Rico annually awards its most outstanding student with the Arturo Somohano Medal for Excellence in International Musical Achievement. San Juan has also honored Somohano's memory by naming a school and a plaza after him.

== Gallery ==
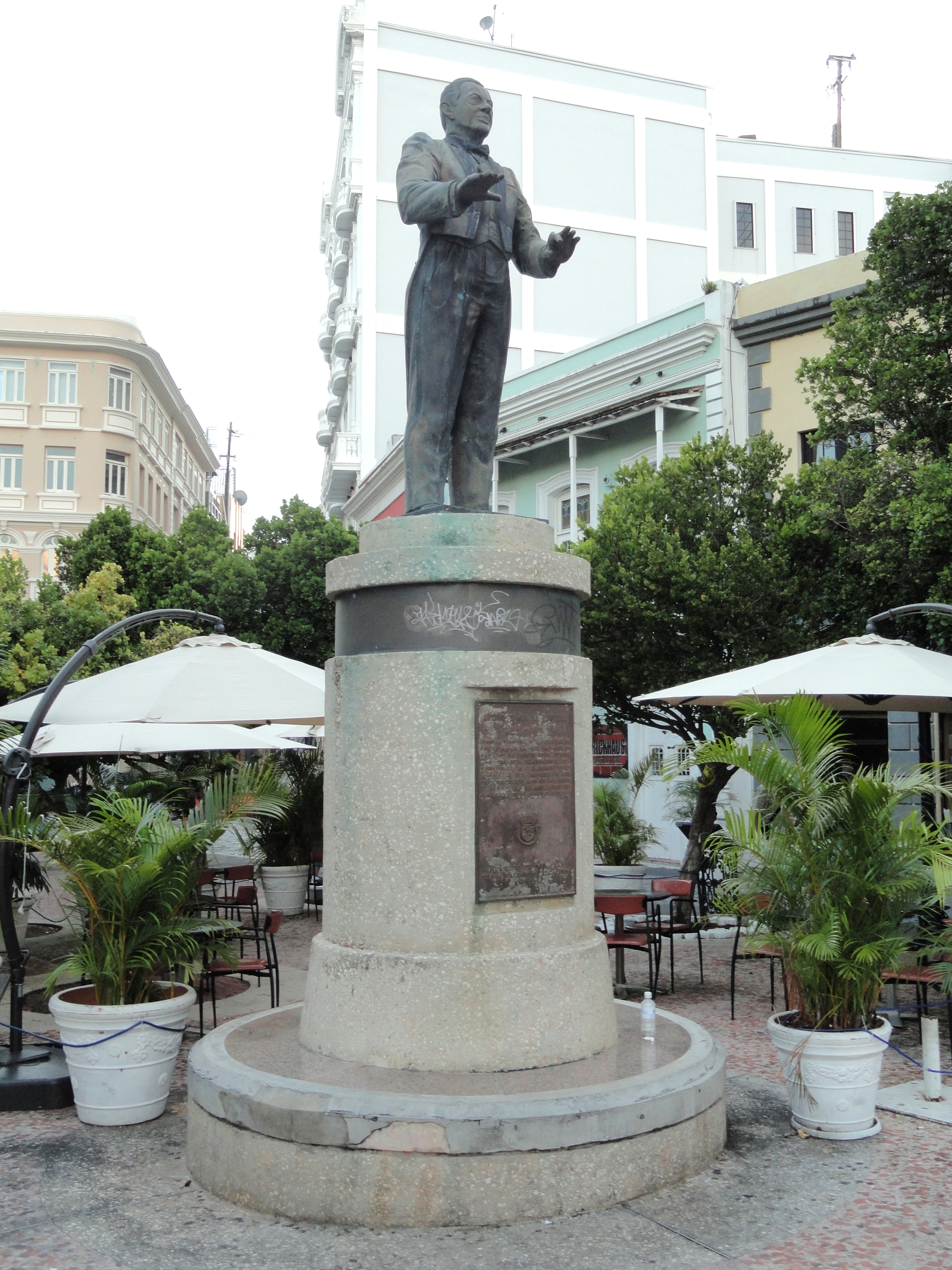
Statue of Arturo Somohano at the plaza, which is named in his honor

== See also ==
- List of Puerto Ricans
