= Lou Briel =

Puerto Rican singer

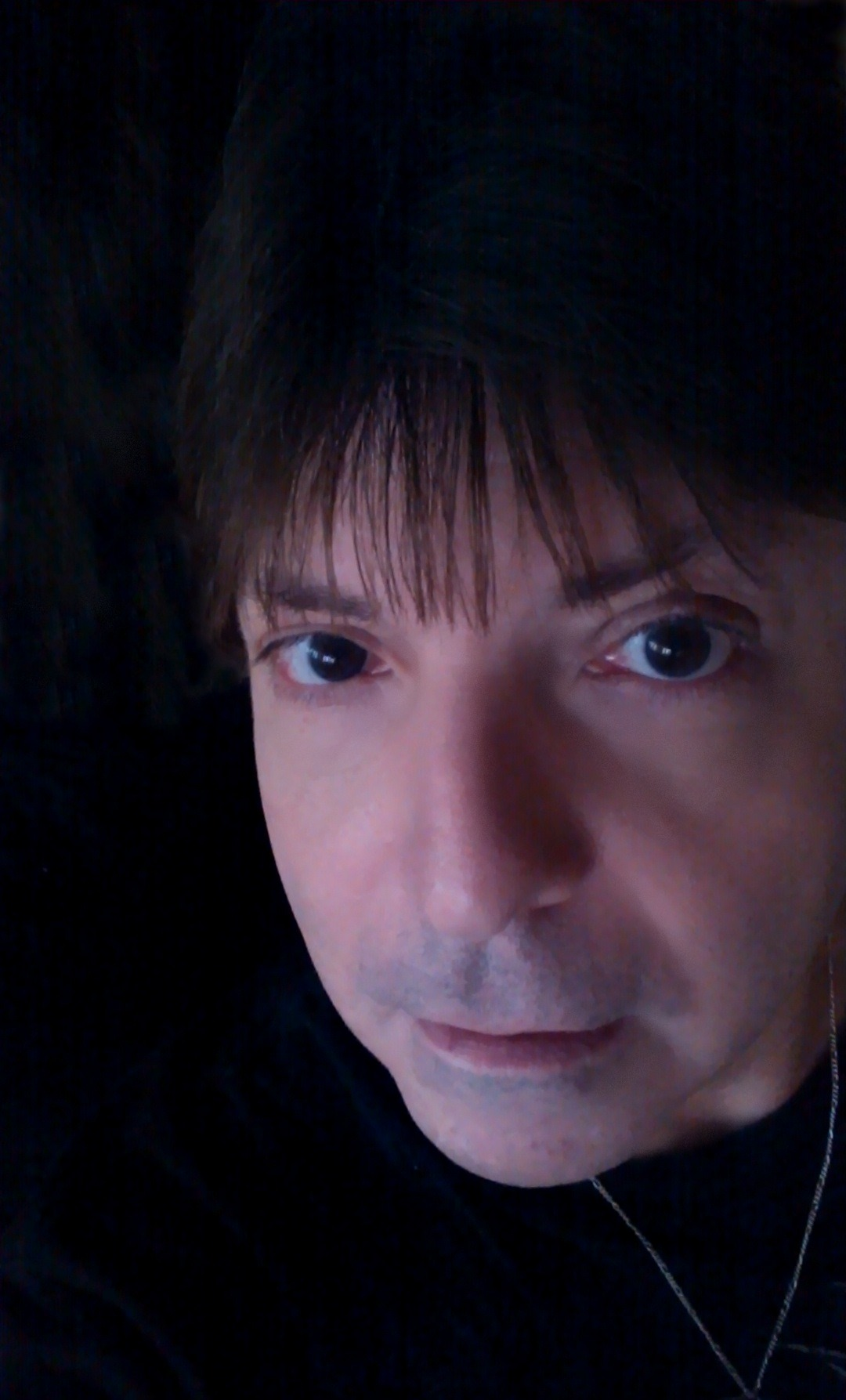
- Lou in the 2010s

Background information
- Born: October 19
- Origin: Santurce, Puerto Rico
- Genres: Pop
- Occupations: Singer, composer, comedian, host, producer
- Instruments: vocal, keyboard
- Years active: 1979–present

Lou Briel (born October 19 Santurce, Puerto Rico) is a Puerto Rican singer, composer, comedian, record producer, pianist, and host, among other things.

== Musical career ==
=== Early years with Anexo 3 ===
Lou Briel started his career at a very young age as a singer, director and member of a pop musical group called Anexo 3. Together they recorded four albums, the first two produced by Alfred D. Herger, and reached popularity with songs such as: "Oh, Cuanto te Amo" ("Oh, how much I love you"), "Contigo" (With you), & "Por eso estoy Preso", (That's why I'm a prisoner), among others. For two consecutive years, Anexo 3 won the second prize of the local OTI Festival in Telemundo with the songs: "Tengo Vida" ("I'm full of life"), and "Más Allá de mis Canciones" ("Beyond my songs"). Both songs were written by Lou Briel and his group partner, Julio Ortiz-Teissonniere. They produced and hosted a television variety show titled Contigo... Anexo 3, (With you... Anexo 3) broadcast by Rikavisión (Channel 7). See:Anexo 3

Anexo 3 also recorded a commercial for Datsun which was very popular on Puerto Rican television at the time. In it, Briel appeared driving a Datsun car while singing the jingle, "Mirame, en esta via, Datsun es perfecto para mi" ("Look at me, in this driveway, Datsun is perfect for me")

=== As a solo artist ===
Anexo 3 broke up and Lou Briel started working on his solo career. In 1984, Briel reached popularity with the song: "Yo puedo" ("I Can"), a song written specially for Puerto Rico's Diva Yolandita an inspirational song about perseverance. He toured throughout Latin American countries such as Mexico, Colombia, Peru, Santo Domingo, and also toured the United States. He also reached one of the first places, in the song festival called "Festi-Buga" in Buga, Colombia, with this song.

Lou Briel has represented Puerto Rico four times at the OTI Festival as a songwriter and one as a singer:

- In 1983, with "Navegaré", ("Staying Afloat") sung by Edgardo Huertas in Washington, D.C.
- In 1984, with "Todo llega", ("Everything comes around"), sung by himself in Mexico City
- In 1985, with "Represento", ("I Represent"), sung by Juan Manuel Lebrón in Seville, Spain. See Lou Briel video singing "Represento":
- In 1990, with "La Mujer que Sueño Ser", ("The Woman I long to be"), sung by his niece Ivonne Briel (now known as "Arana") in Las Vegas, Nevada.

Lou Briel also wrote several songs that participated in other song festivals, such as the 1981 Festival de la Canción de Trujillo (Trujillo's Song Festival) in Perú, and the 1992 Festival de la Voz y la Canción de Mérida (Méridas's Voice & Song Festival) in Yucatán, México.

Many international Latin singers have recorded Lou Briel's compositions, such as, Yolandita Monge, Gilberto Santa Rosa, Juan Manuel Lebrón, Zeny & Zory, Jose Feliciano, Tony Vega, Johanna Rosaly, Los Chicos, Pedro Brull, Sophy, Johnny Rivera, and Grupo Marfil (band) (from Costa Rica).

=== Television composer ===
Lou Briel has also created works for television programs and telenovelas, as opening & title songs.

- De Fiesta con Nydia Nydia Caro (1980s), Telemundo -Opening and closing title song-
- Estudio Alegre Awilda Carbia, Juan Manuel Lebrón, Otilio Warrington (1980s), Telemundo -Opening and closing song-
- El Amor Nuestro de Cada Día Johanna Rosaly 1980, WAPA-TV -Soap opera title theme song-
- Y Esto Qué Es Rafael Jose (1990s), Tele Isla Opening and closing title song
- Ave de Paso Yolandita Monge, (1989), Tele-Once, soap opera theme song: Nunca Te Diré Adiós

among many other variety shows, mini series, TV station promotions, movie soundtracks, television commercials, and so forth.

== Acting career ==
=== Television ===
In 1985, Lou Briel starred, hosted and was the script-writer of a television musical-comedy show in Telemundo called En Broma y en Serio, (Joking & Seriously) together with Puerto Rican comedian and singer Dagmar, produced by Paquito Cordero. He also produced, wrote and hosted a children's television series called: Teatrimundo, broadcast by Telemundo alongside Sandra Zaiter. He characterized himself as "Lubrielito", a 7-year-old child, whose best pal and "puppy love" was "Dagmarita", a fellow child role, portrayed by Dagmar.

In 1991, he played the leading role as an actor-comedian in the TV sitcom called Cara o Cruz, (Heads or Tails), broadcast by WAPA-TV, opposite singer & actor, Edgardo Huertas, (whose first daughter Ambar, is Lou Briel's goddaughter). This show was written and directed by Spanish comedian, Joaquín Monserrat ("Pacheco").

=== Voces en Función ===
From 1995 to 2001, Lou Briel produced and hosted his own variety show titled Voces en Función, (Voices in Performance) where he presented guest stars and young new talents. The show was taped in Mayagüez, Puerto Rico at the Teatro Yagüez and broadcast by WIPR-TV. {See:VEF}

=== Theatre ===
As an actor-comedian, Lou Briel has starred in various Zarzuelas & Operettas in Centro de Bellas Artes in Santurce. Some of them are:

- La Viuda Alegre (The Merry Widow)
- La del Soto del Parral, (The Grapevine Thicket)
- Las Leandras, (The Leanders)
- El Huesped del Sevillano, (The Guest of the Sevillian)
- El Conde de Luxemburgo, (The Count of Luxembourg)
- La Duquesa del Tabarín (The Duchess of the Small Tavern)
- Amalia Batista, (Amalia Batter), among others.

He has also interpreted Sancho Panza from Don Quixote for different theater companies.

Lou Briel has also starred in various children's musicals like:

- Jack y la Mata de Guisantes (Jack and the Beanstalk)
- Los Pitufos (The Smurfs)
- Sueños de Niño (Child Dreams)
- Las Aventuras de Lubrielito (The Adventures of Lubrielito)
- La Bella Durmiente (Sleeping Beauty)
- Los Lobos Malos (The Bad Wolves)
- Tarzán, el Defensor de la Naturaleza (Tarzan, Defender of Nature), among others.

== Recent years ==
In 2004, Lou Briel reprised his role of "Lubrielito" as the leading actor in the family oriented TV film Yo Creo en Santa Claus (I Believe in Santa Claus). The film was produced by Leo Fernández III and also starred Lorel Crespo in her child role as "Lucía". The film was broadcast by Televicentro and WAPA-America. He was also the main director and composer, performing also on the soundtrack and title song of the movie.

In 2005, he directed and performed in the inspirational video clip Dios Alumbra a Puerto Rico (God Enlightens Puerto Rico). It was the first time that 40 Latin pop and Christian gospel music celebrities joined for a laudable purpose, the eradication of child abuse.

In 2006, Lou Briel carried out a nine-month engagement at the Show Time nightspot, with his club act, Bohemia Live.

As of 2007, Lou Briel has been performing in Solo para Hombres.. y para Mujeres tambien, in New York City, Puerto Rico, and Santo Domingo, as a singer, pianist, and musical director alongside, Nancy Alvarez, host of ¿Quién Tiene La Razón?, broadcast by Telefutura.

Briel's presently featured as an MC and singer in the Puerto Rican Folkloric Revue, (designed for tourists), and including native folkloric music and dance, for English-speaking audiences. This spectacle is staged throughout the island and it also has a Spanish version. This performance is produced by Entertainment Concepts Inc. As of 2008, Briel is featured, along Yoyo Boing, Shorty Castro, Dreuxilla Divine, Jose Miguel Class, and Francisco Rosa, at the La Receta de la Abuela Tour (Grandma's Recipe Tour), throughout the island of P.R., sponsored by MCS Classic Care, and produced & MC'd, by Luisito Vigoreaux.

== Discography ==
- Solo Por Fin (1981, CBS)
- Yo Puedo (1984, Global-K-Tel)
- Olas (1987, Velvet)
- En Broma y en Serio en la Navidad con Dagmar (1986, TeleCumbre)
- Reflejos (1988, LBM)
- Sigamos Brindando con Ivonne Briel (1988, LBM)
- En Otra Frecuencia (1991, LBM)
- Edición Especial (1996, LBM)
- Aplauso à la Bachata con Pascual (2004, GOGO)
- Lou Briel con La Maphia Boba... Adondequiera (2008, JODIBA)

== See also ==
- Voces en Función
- Teatrimundo
- List of singer-songwriters
- List of notable residents of San Juan, Puerto Rico
- List of TV theme song composers
- List of composers by nationality
- Puerto Rican songwriters
