= Lunna =

Puerto Rican musician (born 1955)

- Born: Maria Socorro Garcia de la Noceda; 30 June 1955 (age 71); Ponce, Puerto Rico
- Genres: Pop music, jazz
- Occupation: Singer

María Socorro García de la Noceda (Note: Garcia de la Noceda is her paternal surname) (born June 30, 1955), known professionally as Lunna, is a Puerto Rican singer of popular music and jazz who was the director of the television show Objetivo Fama, the Latin version of American Idol.

== Early years ==
Lunna was born and raised by both her parents in Ponce, Puerto Rico. While in elementary school, she learned how to play the guitar and in 1972, her mother had her take private singing lessons. In the 1960s, while still in high school, she began to sing under the name "Soqui", which was short for her middle name Socorro.

In 1978, Lunna auditioned and was accepted in a group called Allegro 72, a locally popular group which included singer Tito Lara and Luis Antonio Cosme. Besides singing for Allegro 72, she also landed jobs singing radio and television commercials. Lunna eventually left the group to start singing solo. Her agent recommended that she change her artistic name, resulting in the "Lunna" name.

She met and became romantically involved with Puerto Rican rock and roll teen idol, Charlie Robles. This romance was highly publicized in Puerto Rico and soon they were married. Socky and Charlie had a daughter, Lisa Marie, from this marriage; however, things didn't go well in the marriage and the couple ended up in divorce.

== Singing career ==
Lunna represented Puerto Rico at the OTI Festival 1982, with the song "Sin tu música". Her fame soared in Puerto Rico, but her career was interrupted because of personal reasons. After four years of absence from the world of music, Glenn Monroig, a fellow singer, convinced her to return. Together they recorded the album A Todo Dar (Everything Gives), the first digitally produced album in Puerto Rico. The album was renamed Motivos (Motives) and was produced by Ángel "Cucco" Peña, it became a big "hit" in Puerto Rico. Among the songs included in the album was the song "Yo Perdí" (I Lost). "Yo Perdí" was converted into a musical video, filmed in 35 mm.

In 1987, Lunna was signed by A&M Records and recorded the following successful songs, "No Digas Nada" (Don't Say Anything), "Ni Princesa, Ni Esclava" (Nor Princess, Nor Slave) and "Fugitivo Amante" (Fugitive Lover). That same year, she was nominated for a Grammy Award. In 1988 and 1989, Lunna continued to score more "hits" with the recording of "Soledad" (Loneliness), "Quien No Ha Sentido..." (Who Hasn't Felt...) and with "Cómo Ser Amantes" (How to be Lovers) written by Michael Bolton.

In 1992, Lunna reunited with Glen Monroig and they recorded the album Yo Que Te Adoré (I, Who Have Adored You). In 2003, Lunna recorded Lunna de Bohemia, which included many classical boleros. That same year, she suffered a personal tragedy when her son died. Lunna, who is also a jazz lover, participated in the "Heineken Jazz Jam Session" and in the "Tropical Night at the Seaport".

== Personal life ==
Lunna was once married to Puerto Rican singer Charlie Robles. The pair had a daughter, named Lisa Marie Robles. In 1983, Lunna married Ángel "Cucco" Peña, with whom she had three children, Gabriel, Juan and Ángel (they later divorced). Her son, Juan Sebastián Peña, died in a traffic accident. Lunna almost died while giving birth to her youngest child Ángel Agustín Peña. The child had his cord umbilical wrapped around his neck.

== Recognitions and awards ==
Among the many recognitions and awards Lunna has received are the following:

- Represented Puerto Rico in the OTI Festival (1981)
- Paoli Best New Artist Award (1986) and (1993)
- Diplo Female Sensation of the Year Award (1986)
- El Vocero Performer of the Year (1986)
- Paoli Performer of the Year Award (1987)
- Collage Night Club Best Show of the Year 1987
- Bravo Awards Miami Performer of the Year 1987
- GRAMMY Nomination Best Latin Performance (1988)
- Dominican Republic Performer of the Year 1988
- Agüeybaná de Oro – Performer of the Year Award 1988
- Super Q Miami Performer of the Year and Best Song of the Tear Awards (1989)
- Special recognition from the Massachusetts House of Representatives (1990)
- El Encanto de la Isla Award (1993)
- Radio WNNW Boston Performer of the Year (1993)
- Official Godmother of the Puerto Rican Day Parade in New York (1994)
- Puerto Rican Camara of Representatives Special Recognition 1994
- J.C. Penney Beauty Luminary 1994
- Special Guest "Banda de Puerto Rico" (Band of Puerto Rico) in Spain (2000)
- Special Guest "Concierto Paz por la Paz" (Peace Concert) (2002)
- Special Recognition from the Senate of Puerto Rico (2004)

== Civic participation ==
Among the many organizations in which Luna is currently involved as a private citizen are the American Cancer Society, Puerto Rico Easter Seals, Say "No" to Drugs campaign, the Pediatric AIDS Center and the National Hispanic Scholarship Fund. She is also a member of "Las Damas Cívicas de Puerto Rico" (The Civic Ladies of Puerto Rico) and she was the director of the television show Objetivo Fama, which was the Latin version of American Idol. Lunna studied classical singing and musical composition at the Music Conservatory of Puerto Rico, where she earned a B.A. in Business Administration.

== Discography ==
- Reflejos (1982)
- A Todo Dar (1985)
- Motivos (1986)
- Lunna (1987)
- Seré Tuya Esta Noche (1989)
- Ventanas (1990)
- Yo Que Te Adoré (1992)
- Formas De Amarte (1997)
- Lunna Bohemia (2003)
- Interpreta las canciones de Yolanda Fernández Sanz (2010)
- Caminas Conmigo (2023)
- En Voz Baja (2026)

Alternate Discography:

- Allegro – 1978
- Te Canto Navidad – Triste Navidad – 1991
- 14 Súper Estrellas – 14 hits – 1991
- Viva Puerto Rico – 1993
- Si Me Miras a Los Ojos – Tony Vega – 1994
- Ricardo Montaner y Amigos – 1994
- Voces de Puerto Rico – "Barrunto" – 1994
- Un Pueblo que Canta (Banco Popular de Puerto Rico) – 1993
- El Espíritu de un Pueblo (Banco Popular de Puerto Rico) – 1994
- Déjame Intentarlo –Johnny Rivera – 1996
- Free to Be, Vol. 6 "Un Amor como el mío", "The Right Stuff" – 1997
- Temptation – Brenda K. Starr – 2002
- Ocho Puertas *(Banco Popular de Puerto Rico) – 2003

Singles

- "No Juegues mas" with Glenn Monroig - 1981
- "Tiempo de vivir" with Fernando Allente 1985
- "Amor de que" 1988
- "Mi Hombre" 1988
- "Que nos paso" (version Telenovela Karina Montaner, 1989)
- "El Tambolirero" BPP, El Espiritu de un pueblo, 1994
- "La tierruca" (BPP, El Espiritu de un pueblo, 1994)
- "Funny Valentine", CD, Humberto Ramirez, 1996
- "El Ciclo de la vida", CD Silverio Perez Frist Bank, 2003)
- "Fuerza Interior", version Objetivo Fama, 2004
- "Cuando Regreses" CD Sandy Silva, 2015
- "Tu Voluntad" (Christian song, 2020)
- "El Alfarero" (Christian song, 2020)

== See also ==
- List of Puerto Ricans
