= Carmita Jiménez =

Puerto Rican singer

- Born: August 3, 1939; San Lorenzo, Puerto Rico
- Died: August 10, 2003 (aged 64); Caguas, Puerto Rico
- Other names: La Dama de la Canción
- Occupation: Singer

Carmen Lydia Jiménez (August 3, 1939 – August 10, 2003), better known as Carmita, was a Puerto Rican singer who was considered a diva in Puerto Rico. She was born in San Lorenzo. Carmita Jiménez started her singing career at the young age of six, on the radio show named El Abuelito Welch (Grandpa Welch) with another legendary Puerto Rican show business legend, José Miguel Agrelot. This show, as its name suggested, was sponsored by the Welch's grape juice brand.

At 15, Jimenez performed the Habanera from Bizet's opera Carmen. Soon after, she joined popular music groups like the Moncho Usera orchestra. She released her first album, which contained the hit Tierra Rica (Rich Land) referencing Puerto Rico, where she was born.

During the 1960s, Jimenez became a popular fixture on Puerto Rico's television and enjoyed great renown. She decided then that it was time to internationalize her career and moved to Peru in 1961, to promote herself in South America. Her stay in Peru, which lasted until 1968, made her very popular among the citizens of that country too. There she gave birth to her only daughter, María Nahíma, who as her mother, began singing professionally since a child. Carmita kept on releasing albums and scoring more hits.

After she returned to Puerto Rico in 1968, she landed her own section on WAPA-TV's popular lunch-time show El Show Del Mediodia.

During the 1970s, Carmita became a part of the Disco Music movement in her country, and had the number one hit La Generacion De Hoy (Today's Generation), produced by Alfred D. Herger, which was followed by La Vida En Rosa (Life In Pink), a song which was later a hit in English too, Grace Jones performing the English version.

Jimenez began bringing down her yearly number of appearances since 1985, becoming a more private person. In September 1990 she debuted as a stage actress in the San Juan premiere production of Rodolfo Santana's "Baño de Damas", with an all-star cast that included Gladys Rodriguez, Giselle Blondet, Marisol Calero, and Johanna Rosaly. In February 1991 she returned to the stage as Sister Mary Hubert (Sor María José) in the San Juan premiere production of Dan Goggins' musical comedy "Sor-Presas" (Nunsense). Both productions played at the historic Tapia Theater in Old San Juan. In 1994, she participated in a concert named Algo Mas Que Una Cantante (More Than Just a Singer) at San Juan's Centro de Bellas Artes, a concert which reunited many international singing super-stars.

As it turned out, there was a reason for her winding down the number of public appearances each year: In 2002, she announced during an interview with Vea that she had been diagnosed with cancer in 1985. The fact is that the cancer she had for almost 20 years had spread into bone metastasis and she battled it all that time. She tried several cures, including a 4 month-visit to a private clinic in Switzerland with her daughter, singer and lyricist Maria Nahima. Carmita died at her home in Caguas, Puerto Rico after succumbing to breast cancer. She was buried at Cementerio Borinquen Memorial Park I in Caguas, Puerto Rico. One of the rooms at the Centro de Bellas Arts de Caguas (a performing arts center in Caguas which underwent major renovations after Hurricane Maria) is named after Carmita Jiménez.

== See also ==
- List of Puerto Ricans
- History of women in Puerto Rico
