= Chucho Avellanet =

Puerto Rican singer and comedic actor

- Born: August 13, 1941 (age 84); Mayagüez, Puerto Rico
- Occupations: Singer, actor

Armando Hipólito Avellanet González, nicknamed "Chucho", is a Puerto Rican singer and comedic actor of Spanish-Catalan descent. Avellanet was involved with the Nueva ola movement in the 1960s. He represented Puerto Rico in the OTI Festival 1972 with the song "Por ti".

== Entertainment career ==
Avellanet, along Lucecita Benítez and Al Zeppy were brought in to WKAQ-TV in a segment known as El club canta la juventud. It was at that station that he met Lissette and in 1967, their wedding was aired. Avellanet appeared in Arturo Correa's 1970 musical Libertad para la juventud. That same year, he was featured in Rubén Galindo's co-production with Mexican interests, Un amante anda suelto.

Despite critics, Avellanet then left WKAQ due to the influence of his former wife Marisela Berti who had a leading role in Producciones Tommy Muñiz's Los García. On November 14, 1985, Avellanet debuted on WRIK-TV, Muñiz's channel, a hit to Cordero by removing one of its biggest draws. However, the show did not gather the results of its predecessor. Some time later, the couple divorced. With a loose concept Los siete del Siete would take over the prime time slot Thursdays, and be host by a number of local talents including Agrelot, Morales, Olivo, Avellanet, Jovet and Logroño. He was along several figures, including Los Gamma, that participated in the inauguration of Súper Siete following the sale of the channel. On February 3, 1997, he participated in Los 75 años de don Tommy, a special dedicated to Muñiz's career.

== See also ==
- List of Puerto Ricans
