= La Pandilla en Apuros =

1976 teen musical comedy film with Spanish group La Pandilla

- Produced by: Alfred D. Herger
- Starring: La Pandilla; Adrian Garcia; Felito Félix
- Release date: 1976
- Countries: Puerto Rico; Spain
- Language: Spanish

La Pandilla en Apuros ("La Pandilla is in Trouble") is a 1976 musical teen-comedy film featuring the well known teenage musical group from Spain, La Pandilla.

The film, which was produced by Alfred D. Herger, was recorded at the Condado Beach Hotel (where the group stayed at for the duration of the filming) and at other locations in San Juan, Puerto Rico, including the Isla Verde International Airport.

Apart from featuring the members of La Pandilla, the film marked the movie debut of Puerto Rican comedian Adrian Garcia and of fellow Puerto Rican, singer Felito Félix.

== Plot ==
La Pandilla is in Puerto Rico for a series of concerts. While there, they get involved in a situation involving a stolen audio recorder. The group also performs at a concert which was held at Roberto Clemente Coliseum in San Juan.

== Soundtrack ==
The movie had a soundtrack album which was also released in 1976. The album contained the following songs:

1. La Pandilla en apuros
2. Diálogos de La Pandilla
3. Bakala Nanu Meme Suite
4. Comprando sombreros
5. La dama vaquera
6. La piscina
7. 1-2-3
8. Quiero ser tu amigo
9. Los recien casaditos
10. Quiero volar
11. Primo Pachanga

== See also ==
- Conexión Caribe - a movie featuring Los Chicos de Puerto Rico
- Menudo: La Pelicula - a movie featuring Menudo
- Una Aventura Llamada Menudo - a movie featuring Menudo
- Secuestro En Acapulco-Canta Chamo - a movie featuring Los Chamos
