= List of yé-yé singers =

The following is a list of yé-yé singers, a genre of pop music and associated youth culture that originated in the early 1960s in France and spread to other countries like Spain, Portugal and Italy. A female-fronted phenomenon, yé-yé singers were mostly teenage girls that sung flirty love songs. Nevertheless, almost all of the songwriters were male, as were the heads in the music industry and the specialized press.

== A ==
- Adele
- Adriángela
- Audrey

== B ==
- Ana Belén
- Betina
- Jane Birkin
- Brigitte Bardot

== C ==
- Camille
- Céline
- Cléo
- Clothilde
- Albertina Cortés
- Cosette

== D ==
- Dani
- Catherine Desmarets
- Rocío Dúrcal

== E ==
- Élizabeth
- Elsa
- Evy

== G ==
- Serge Gainsbourg
- France Gall
- Gelu
- Géraldine
- Chantal Goya

== H ==
- Johnny Hallyday
- Françoise Hardy
- Gillian Hills

== J ==
- Jocelyne

== K ==
- Karina
- Katty Linez
- Chantal Kelly

== L ==
- Christie Laume
- Elsa Leroy
- Katty Line

== M ==
- Marisol
- Massiel

== O ==
- Olivia

== P ==
- Annie Philippe
- Christine Pilzer
- Pussy Cat

== R ==
- Rosalía

== S ==
- Salomé
- Sandro de América
- Sheila
- Natacha Snitkine

== T ==
- Jacqueline Taïeb
- Luisita Tenor
- Monique Thubert

== U ==
- Laura Ulmer

== V ==
- Stella Vander
- Sylvie Vartan
- Concha Velasco
- Vetty
- Virginie

== Z ==
- Zouzou
