= Secuestro En Acapulco-Canta Chamo =

1983 Venezuelan-Mexican teen comedy musical film

Secuestro en Acapulco-Canta Chamo is a 1983 Venezuelan-Mexican teen musical comedy film, starring the well known Venezuelan boy band, Los Chamos, as well as Mexican actor Cesar Bono (in one of his early films), Mexican actress Lucila Mariscal, Mexican singer and actress Yuri, and Mexican actress Maria Antonieta de las Nieves. The movie was released internationally during 1983. It has a duration of 90 minutes.

== Plot ==
Los Chamos, a Venezuelan boy band, arrive in Mexico for a series of concerts. While there, they meet their tour manager, "Benita" (Mariscal), singer "Rosita" (Yuri) and one particular fan, "Carlota", (de las Nieves) who intends to kidnap one of the band members, during a visit to Acapulco, Guerrero for a concert, to keep him as a boyfriend.

The group also meets and helps a young female fan who needs a medical operation.

== Cast ==
- Argenis Brito - as Chamo Argenis
- William Márquez Uzcategui - as Chamo Will
- Walter Márquez Uzcategui - as Chamo Walter
- Winston Márquez Uzcategui - as Chamo Winston
- Enrique Couselo - as Chamo Enrique
- Gabriel Fernandez - as Chamo Gabriel
- María Antonieta de las Nieves - as Carlota
- Yuri - as Rosita
- Lucila Mariscal - as Benita
- Cesar Bono - as musical representant

== Other information ==
During the movie's filming, several cast members became friends; Gabriel Fernandez of Los Chamos and co-star Yuri had a short but well publicized romance. The two later married other people and remained as life-long friends.

== See also ==
- La Pandilla en Apuros - a film starring Spanish teen group La Pandilla
- Coneccion Caribe - a film starring boy band Los Chicos de Puerto Rico
- Menudo:La Pelicula - a film starring Puerto Rican boy band Menudo
- Una Aventura Llamada Menudo - a film starring Puerto Rican boy band Menudo
