= Mermelada =

Dominican boy band

Mermelada was a boy band from the Dominican Republic. During the 1980s, when other Latin teen musical bands such as Puerto Rico's Menudo and Los Chicos, Venezuela's Los Chamos, Spain's Parchis and others enjoyed commercial success across Latin America and Europe, Mermelada was the Dominican Republic's main album-selling teen and boy band.

== History ==
Mermelada released their self-titled album, Mermelada, in 1983. This album included title song "Mermelada", as well as a cover of Survivor's song "Eye of the Tiger" ("Maria Elena)" and one of Toni Basil's "Hey Mickey" ("Vickie"). Other songs included "Los Hijos de Machepa" and "Robot".

Mermelada enjoyed success around the Dominican Republic and other Latin countries. Nevertheless, after the early-80s wave of popularity for Spanish-singing boy bands waned somewhat from the mid-80s, groups such as Los Chicos and Mermelada ended up separating, and only Menudo survived for a significant period. Mermelada's separation was hastened by Monchy Capricho's departure from the group in the late 1980s, and the band survived for only a couple of years more.

Nevertheless, Mermelada was used as a launching pad by Capricho, who became a successful Merengue singer.
