= Felito Félix =

Puerto Rican singer, actor and composer

- Born: Félix Meléndez León; June 13, 1939 (age 86); Cidra, Puerto Rico
- Genres: Bolero
- Occupations: singer, actor and composer

Felito Félix (born June 13, 1939) is a Puerto Rican singer, actor and song composer whose musical career has lasted for 69 years. He has recorded 67 albums. In addition, he is the composer of the municipal hymn of his hometown, Cidra, Puerto Rico.

== Biography ==
Felito Félix is a native of Cidra, Puerto Rico.

In 1976, Félix debuted as an actor, along with Spanish teen musical group La Pandilla in a movie named "La Pandilla en Apuros", an Alfred D. Herger production which was filmed in San Juan, Puerto Rico.

Félix had been semi-retired from his career as a musician after his wife was diagnosed with cancer; after she died, he made a musical comeback.

== Personal ==
Felito Félix was married for 50 years to Delia Rosa Garced.

== See also ==
- List of Puerto Ricans
