= Lucila Mariscal =

Mexican comedienne, actress, singer and song writer (born 1940)

- Born: June 18, 1942 (age 82); Mexico City, Mexico
- Occupation(s): Actress, director, comedian, singer, composer
- Years active: 1969–present
- Spouse(s): Julián Gallegos (separated, 2021)
- Children: 2 sons, Andrey Alexis Hernández Mariscal (disappeared, 2009), Gabriel Arturo

Lucila Marina Mariscal Lara (born July 18, 1942 in Mexico City, Mexico) is a Mexican actress, comedian, director, singer and song composer. Mariscal has had an extensive show business career spanning more than 50 years; she may be better remembered by Mexican audiences for her character of "Lencha", which she played in films, theater, television, and in song, but to international audiences, specially those in other Spanish-speaking countries, she may be best remembered for her participation in the film Secuestro En Acapulco-Canta Chamo, a 1983 movie where she played the role of the local tour manager of Venezuelan boy band, Los Chamos.

== Early life ==
Mariscal's life was filled with challenges even before she was born; her biological father abandoned her mother as her mother was pregnant with Mariscal because, according to newspaper El Heraldo de México, he was obliged to marry someone else, a Monterrey woman, instead.

As a baby, Mariscal and her family moved to Culiacan, Sinaloa, but she and her family returned to Mexico City six years later.

Mariscal's talents enabled her to study at the Instituto Nacional de Bellas Artes y Literatura.

== Career ==
Mariscal began her acting and directing film and theater career in 1969.

1976 saw Mariscal's debut in front of television screens in Mexico, as she was cast for a show named "Los Polivoces". In 1979, Mariscal made her film debut in the Mexican comedy "4 Hembras y un Macho Menos" ("4 Women and one Less Man"). She followed that with her participation in two 1980 films, named "Reventon en Acapulco" ("Party in Acapulco") and "Cuentos Colorados" ("Red Colored Tales" but which translates better to "Off-Color-or Double entendre-Tales").

During 1983, Mariscal acted in the movie that brought her international fame, "Secuestro En Acapulco-Canta Chamo" ("Kidnapping In Acapulco-Please Sing, Chamo!"), a Mexico-Venezuela film production that also starred Venezuelan boy band Los Chamos as well as Yuri, Cesar Bono and Maria Antonieta de las Nieves in supporting roles; Mariscal played the band's Mexican tour manager. This film was seen in movie theaters in Mexico, Venezuela and various other Spanish-speaking countries. By that era, Mariscal was also acting in the Mexican television show, "La Carabina de Ambrosio" ("Ambrosio's Rifle"), which was a hit show that lasted on the air from 1982 to 1984.

From that moment on, Mariscal was able to build a substantial resume on her career, as she participated in 22 more films and 15 television series, including telenovelas such as "Valentina", where she acted alongside Veronica Castro, among others, playing the character of "Amada Paniagua".

Many of those films were comedies where she played the main character on them, an Indian woman named "Lencha". "Lencha" became Mariscal's best known character. She is sometimes called that by fans and media outlets.

=== Musical career ===
Mariscal launched a singing career in the 1980s and released a number of musical albums. One of her best known albums is 1987's "El Moñoñongo", ("The Vagina") which included ten songs.

== Personal and health problems ==
Mariscal has faced several personal and health challenges in her life, beginning, as aforementioned, with the abandonment of her and her mother by her father before Mariscal was born.

Mariscal's 34 year old son, Andrey Alexis Hernández Mariscal, was kidnapped during 2009. A policeman, he was the sub-director or second-in-command of the police department of Linares, Nuevo Leon, in Northeastern Mexico. After this, her daughter-in-law developed breast cancer and Mariscal became a diabetic, both situations which she blames on her son's kidnapping. Mariscal lost a large amount of money searching for her son. She had another son, Gabriel Arturo, who is a computers repairman and occasional actor.

There have also been reports of problems between her and her grandson Andrei. Those reports indicate he has been abusive to her without specifying any type of abuse.

She also declared that, at age 16, she was drugged and raped by a boyfriend. She promptly broke up with the alleged perpetrator.

Mariscal was once married to a man named Julián Gallegos; he left her and she alleged that he was a drug and wife abuser while with her. In addition, she says he left her completely broke.

She suffered a fall late in 2021, requiring hospitalization. She wears a prosthesis on her hip. She also had hernia surgery in 2022.

Mariscal has also suffered from depression at various times. She has thought about, but never attempted, suicide.

== See also ==
- List of Mexicans
- María Elena Velasco - actress who played the well known character, La India María
