= Ed Trucco =

Puerto Rican-American actor

Eduardo Trucco
- Born: June 3, 1963 (age 63); New York City, New York, United States
- Occupations: Actor, producer, sportscaster
- Years active: 1971–present

Eduardo "Ed" Trucco (born June 3, 1963, in New York City) is a Puerto Rican–American actor, producer and former sportscaster of Argentine descent. Trucco is best known as Manning in the American television series Law and Order, agent Patrick O'Hara in Al otro lado del muro and DEA agent Ernie Palermo, who is the character that speaks the most English in the third season of La Reina del Sur. In his youth, he was known for his participation in two boy-band related movies in Puerto Rico.

Trucco has also been involved in sportscasting, as when he was in his late teens, he hosted a BMX bike racing show in Puerto Rico and has also participated in some World Wrestling Entertainment television shows.

== Early life ==
Trucco was born in Queens, New York City, the son of Orestes Trucco, an Argentine film director, and a Puerto Rican mother named Gladys. At a very young age, Trucco moved to Argentina, where he lived for ten years, and where he became a big association football fan. Among his first life dreams were hopes of becoming a football player and, perhaps, join the Argentina men's national football team someday. But the Trucco family moved to Puerto Rico early in Ed's youth, and since association football was not well established in that Caribbean country as of yet, his dreams of becoming a football player were basically dashed, and Trucco decided to concentrate on acting and on television work instead.

== Acting and television career ==
At the age of eight, Trucco made his film debut, in an Argentine film named "Hipolito y Evita" ('"Hipolito and Evita", which was an Argentine version of the Romeo and Juliet love story). He also acted in "Yo Gané al Prode" ("I Beat the Brave"), which was another Argentine film.

By 1982, when Trucco was in his late teens, he was hired by his father Orestes to work in his (Orestes') directed movie, where he (Ed) joined Puerto Rican boy band Menudo in their second film, named "Una Aventura Llamada Menudo" ("An Adventure Named Menudo"). Ed Trucco played "Eduardo" in that movie, which became a major cinema hit in Puerto Rico and the rest of Latin America and was also seen in some states in the United States. Trucco's role in that film was substantial as he appeared on several scenes.

Alongside with the movie, Trucco was by then also hosting a weekly BMX races television show in Puerto Rico. The film and the sports show gave him teen-idol status in the island.

In 1984, Trucco was involved in another Puerto Rican film involving a Puerto Rican boy band; this time, named "Conexion Caribe" ("Caribbean Connection"), which was also directed by his father and which starred Menudo's top musical rivals of the era, Los Chicos (which, at the time, included future international singing star Chayanne). Trucco played "Quique", another character whose role in the story was also pretty substantial.

In the mid-80s, Trucco acted in some telenovelas in Puerto Rico; in one of them, he met his future sister in law, actress Giselle Blondet.

During the late 1980s, Trucco returned to New York City from Puerto Rico. He then dedicated himself to acting in theater, but in 1991, he made his Hollywood debut, participating as "Jimmy" in "Highlander 2: The Quickening". In 1994, the by-then 31 years old Trucco participated in a made-for-television film named "Eyes of Terror", as a police officer. Around that era also, he started appearing on the World Wrestling Entertainment's series WWE Raw, a show in which he worked at for one year, appearing in nine episodes. Trucco shared hosting responsibilities with Colombian Carlos Cabrera and with Ecuatorian-Puerto Rican Hugo Savinovich on that show.

At some point early in his career, Trucco was one of the first MTV veejay, along with Daisy Fuentes. in Spanish for Telemundo.

Next, Trucco appeared in 1995's "Kiss of Death", playing the role of Calvin's (played by Samuel L. Jackson) partner. 1995 also saw Trucco appear in "Manhattan Merengue!", as "Rudy". Also during 1995, Trucco appeared at "Law and Order" for the first time, as a paramedic, in a show titled "Hot Pursuit".

Trucco in 2001, was again seen on "Law and Order", this time as "Manning" in the episode titled "Who Let The Dogs Out?". In 2004, Trucco acted in "Maria Full of Grace", as a customs inspector.

In 2006, he was then cast as "Leo" in the 2007 film "Shut Up and Do It" and had his first participation in a video game, when he lent his voice as "Project Militia" in the game "Manhunt 2". In 2008, Trucco played "Jesus" in "La Mala".

From 2007 to 2009, Trucco participated in a number of short films, and then, in 2010, he was in the Peruvian film "Postcards"

In 2015, he was cast as a business man for one episode of the television series Mr. Robot. In 2016, he appeared as "Mr. X" in the episode titled "A Dog's Breakfast" of the television series "Limitless" and he appeared in the movie "America Adrift" (as "Phillip")

In 2017, Trucco participated in two television mini-series ("LaGolda"-"The Fat One"-as "Carlos and "Milagro de Navidad"-"Christmas Miracle"- as "Tom") and one short film, which was named "Runaway" and where he played "Mason", before another big break arrived for him: he was cast as "Patrick O' Hara" in the Telemundo mini-series "Al otro lado del muro" ("To The Other Side Of The Wall") and played that character in 58 episodes. By then, Trucco had received an offer from Mexico to go there and work at "La Reina del Sur 2", but he was not selected to join the series at that time.

Trucco filmed two movies in 2018: "Fists of Love" as "Chris" and "Even After Everything" as "Richard Warren".

He returned to television acting in 2019, acting as "Pete" in the Telemundo series "You Cannot Hide" and as "Roland" in "A Couple in Quarantine".

Trucco followed the latter two movies with his participation in the feature film "Rumba Love", where he appeared as "Jim". Then, in 2022, Trucco acted in "La Reina del Sur III", as DEA agent "Ernie Palermo".

== Personal life ==
Trucco is often cast to play anglo-saxon characters, such as "Al Otro Lado del Muro"'s "Patrick O'Hara". He is a fervent fan of association football and of the Argentine men's national football team. Through his older brother, producer Harold Trucco, he was once the brother-in-law of Puerto Rican actress and show host Giselle Blondet and is the uncle of their daughter Gabriela and son Harold, Jr..

== See also ==
- List of Puerto Ricans

== Filmography ==
=== Video games ===
Year	Title	Voice role
2007	Manhunt 2	Project Militia
2026	Grand Theft Auto VI	Ernesto
