= Gabriel Fernández (singer) =

Venezuelan singer and actor (born 1968)

Gabriel Fernández (born March 24, 1966, in Caracas, Venezuela) is a Venezuelan singer, actor and YouTube personality. He is best known as a member of 1980s Venezuelan boy band, Los Chamos, and is sometimes remembered by his nickname of "Chamo Gabriel" by the band's fans.

== Biography ==
Fernández wanted to be a musician since a very young age. He practiced the trumpet as an instrument, and he tried joining the Venezuelan Children's Symphony, but his father did not agree with the boy's show business aspirations and did not allow young Gabriel to join that orchestra.

By 1981, Fernández decided to audition for the well-known boy band, Menudo. According to allegations that Fernández made some 40 years later during early 2021 to former Menudo member Ray Reyes (who was collecting testimonies for an editorial work he wanted to make about band director Edgardo Diaz's supposed abuses of band members), Fernandez was chosen as member Rene Farrait's successor at Menudo and was flown to Aruba during a Menudo tour to keep practicing with the band, but a harrowing incident took place when Fernández was told that he was going to spend a night at a hotel with 3 adult males and when he got to the hotel, he figured out that none of the band's members were there and he was the only child present with those males, and, according to his account, he was also told that he was going to sleep with Diaz in Diaz's bed that night. Fernández said that he left the room upon hearing that, and that he spent the night crying outside of the room instead, finding himself in a plane flying back home to Venezuela the next day after being told that he was not going to join Menudo after all. Charlie Masso, another Puerto Rican, eventually did substitute Farrait instead, and a few years later, Mexican Adrian Olivares became the first non-Puerto Rican to sing with Menudo.

Soon, another opportunity arrived for Fernández to join a well-known Latin boy band, as Los Chamos member Ricardo Messina was leaving that group, and Fernández once again, auditioned to become a member of a boy band. Fernández was chosen as the new member of Los Chamos, and the band enjoyed much success in Latin America. While Los Chamos, much like Los Chicos de Puerto Rico, did not achieve the level of success that Menudo did, it became arguably the most well-known boy band from South America when Fernández was a member, and he recorded three albums with them.

In 1983, Los Chamos were featured in a Mexican-Venezuelan film production named "Secuestro En Acapulco-Canta Chamo", which allowed Fernández to make his film acting debut. On some of the film's theatrical posters, Fernández featured as the leading singer of one of the band's songs. During the filming of the movie, Fernández was able to meet the band's film co-star, Yuri, and the two had a short but well-publicized romance. While they broke up shortly thereafter, the pair formed a lifelong friendship.

After leaving Los Chamos, Fernández settled back home in Venezuela, but he left sporadically to pursue an international acting career, such as the time he acted in the Mexican telenovela hit, "Quinceanera" (as a character that was aptly named "El Chamo"). He also participated in his first Venezuelan telenovela, "Cristal", and recorded his first solo album, named "Piensa en Mi" ("Think About Me"). Gabriel Fernández signed with the Venezuelan television network, Radio Caracas Television, and worked there as an actor for 18 years.

As of 2023, Fernández has a YouTube channel where he hosts a talk show, named "Live Retro Show". In it, he has interviewed several celebrities, including many former members of Menudo.

== Personal life ==
Fernández once dated Mexican singer Yuri; the two have been friends ever since.

He was once married to Astrid Gruber. From that relationship, he has two daughters: one is actress Scarlet Gruber and the other is named Stefani.

He declared himself a Christian during one of his YouTube transmissions.

== See also ==
- List of Venezuelans
- Adolfo Cubas - another former member of Los Chamos and actor
