= Cléo (French singer) =

French singer

Chantal Rousselot (1946) stage name Cléo is a French yéyé singer popular 1966–1970. She recorded six singles, two of them with Richard Fontaine as the duo Cédric et Cléo, inspired by Sonny and Cher. She married Herbert Léonard whom she met in 1967.

== Discography ==
Cédric et Cléo

- 1966: Chaque fois qu'une fille passe / Le Jour se lèvera sur tout ça / Des lendemains / Adam et Ève (Vogue EPL 8409)
- 1966: Rien à faire, rien à dire / Ce monde existe / Alors tant pis / Plus vingt moins vingt (Vogue EPL 8476)

Cléo

- 1966: Les Fauves / Dis petit / Et moi, et toi, et soie (écrit par Jacques Dutronc en référence à Et moi, et moi, et moi) / Madame la terre (Vogue EPL 8503)
- 1967: Ce n'est qu'un au revoir mes sœurs / Les Bouaïtes / L'Épitaphe de Cléo / Parti-pris (Vogue EPL 8533)
- 1968: La Standardiste (en référence à la chanson de Nino Ferrer Le Téléfon) / La Lady du colonel Pickson / Les Amours / La di la (Vogue EPL 8574)
- 1968: À mes bottes / On court / Un dur au cœur tendre / Pourquoi veux-tu que l'on se marie (Voque EPL 8621)
