= En un mundo nuevo (film) =

- Theatrical release poster
- Directed by: Fernando García de la Vega; Ramón Torrado
- Starring: Karina; La Pandilla
- Cinematography: Antonio L. Ballesteros
- Edited by: Gaby Peñalba
- Music by: Waldo de los Ríos
- Color process: Eastmancolor
- Production companies: Cesáreo González P.C.; P.I.C.A.S.A.
- Release date: 13 March 1972
- Running time: 92 minutes
- Country: Spain
- Language: Spanish

En un mundo nuevo is a 1972 Spanish musical film directed by Fernando García de la Vega and Ramón Torrado, starring Karina and La Pandilla. The film is inspired by Karina's real-life participation at the Eurovision Song Contest 1971 and shows actual footage of her performance of the song "En un mundo nuevo" there.

== Plot ==
Juanito is the owner of a record company that must prepare professional singer Marta to represent Spain in the Eurovision Song Contest with the song composed by her fiancé, Carlos. At the same time, Juanito has discovered a teen music group called La Pandilla, whom he takes to his house and hires Karina as a governess to educate them. She teaches the children singing and over time she gains their affection and love, and the interest of Carlos. Seeing that Carlos pays too much attention to Karina, Marta leaves for a rival record label. The children convince Juanito and Carlos to let Karina be the one to represent Spain in Eurovision with "En un mundo nuevo".

== Cast ==
- Karina as a fictional version of herself.
- La Pandilla –Francisco Javier Martínez, Juan Carlos Martínez, Mari Nieves Martínez, Santiago Martínez, and Mari Blanca Ruíz Martínez– as a fictional version of themselves.
- Pepe Rubio as Carlos Peñafiel.
- Juanito Navarro as Juanito.
- Marisa Medina as Marta.
- Florinda Chico as Florinda.
- Guadalupe Muñoz Sampedro as Doña Lupe.
- Paquito Cano as Paco.
- Andrés Pajares as Chefalo Palermo.
- Joaquín Prat as TV host.
- María Kosti as Carmela.
- Ángel Álvarez as Taxi driver.

== Production ==
Following Karina's real-life success at the Eurovision Song Contest 1971 where she placed second representing Spain with the song "En un mundo nuevo", the film was created inspired by her participation in the contest, featuring a fictional version of herself. The film shows footage of her actual performance in Eurovision filmed at the Gaiety Theatre in Dublin during dress rehearsals.

== Songs ==
- "En un mundo nuevo"
- "El baúl de los recuerdos"
- "Yo te diré"
- "Tú y yo"
- "El capitán de madera"
- "Lección de urbanidad"
- "Porque eres tú mi mamá"
- "A mi perro"
