= Karina (Spanish singer) =

Spanish singer (born 1945)

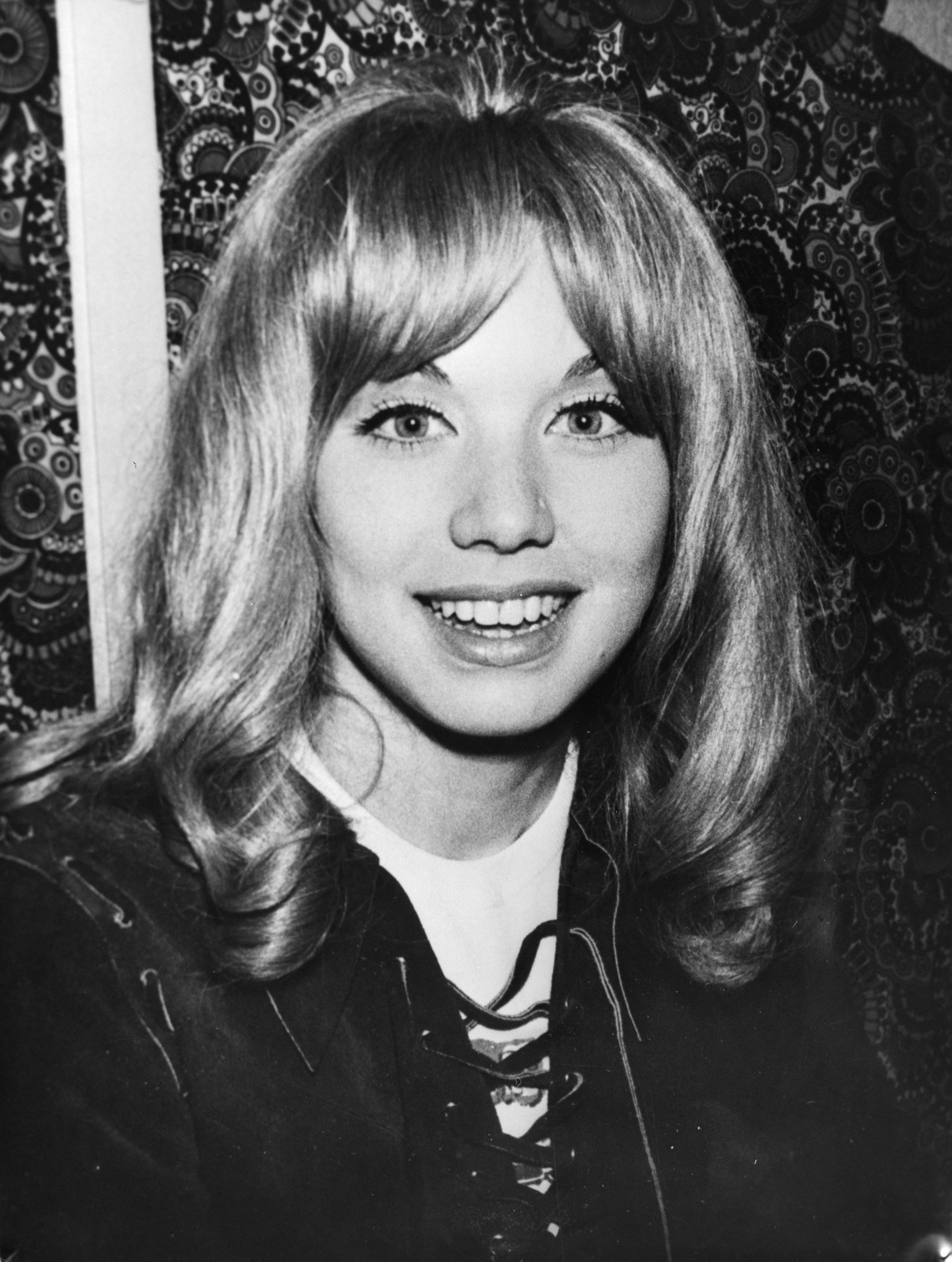
- Karina in 1971

Background information
- Born: María Isabel Llaudes Santiago; 4 December 1945 (age 80); Jaén, Spain
- Genres: Yé-yé
- Years active: 1961–present
- Labels: RCA; Hispavox
- Spouse: Tony Luz (m. 1973; div. 1975) Carlos Manuel Díaz (m. 1981; div. 1987) Juan Miguel (m. 1988; div. 1990) Miguel León (m. 2000; div. 2002)

María Isabel Llaudes Santiago (born 4 December 1945), better known by her stage name Karina, is a Spanish singer who had her biggest success from the late 1960s until the mid-1970s in Spain and Latin America. She represented Spain at the Eurovision Song Contest 1971 with the song "En un mundo nuevo", where she placed second.

== Career ==
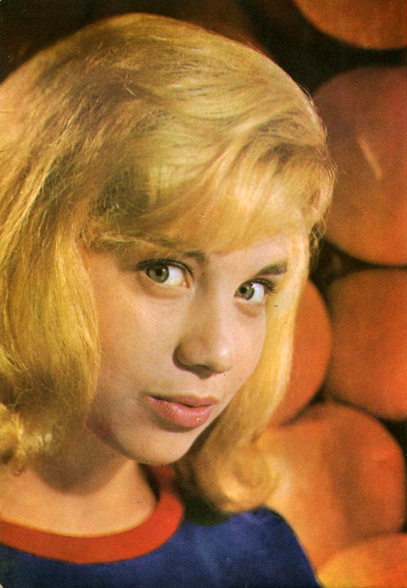
Karina in 1963.

After having entered several radio contests, she was chosen to sing on a flexi disc that a brand of car lubricant gave away with the purchase of its products, which was the first song she recorded, "Bikini Amarillo" (Note: Spanish-language version of Brian Hyland's song "Itsy Bitsy Teenie Weenie Yellow Polkadot Bikini"). She subsequently recorded several albums with RCA, and participated in the 1961 Benidorm Song Festival with the song "No preguntes por qué". She became known to the Spanish audience in 1963 when she starred in the television musical show Escala en hi-fi on Televisión Española (TVE), and in the film adaptation of it.

In 1965, she signed with Hispavox where she recorded "Muñeca de cera" (Note: Spanish-language version of France Gall's song "Poupée de cire, poupée de son") and the contemporary versions in Spanish and Portuguese of the James Bond song "Goldfinger". Also in 1965, she participated in the Mallorca International Song Festival with the song "Me lo dijo Pérez", placing second. (Note: Karina, and another contestant Adriángela, also won a fifteen-day trip to Sweden with all expenses paid.) In 1966, she was awarded as the Best Yé-yé Singer. Several of her songs, like "Romeo y Julieta" (Note: Spanish-language version of the German song "Romeo und Julia"), "Las flechas del amor" (Note: Spanish-language version of Leapy Lee's song "Little Arrows"), "El baúl de los recuerdos", and "La fiesta" (Note: Spanish-language version of Marty Wilde's song "Abergavenny") became hits in Spain. She also starred in several films such as Los chicos del Preu and Would You Marry Me? (both in 1967), and in La chica de los anuncios (1968).

In 1970, she participated in Pasaporte a Dublín, TVE's national selection for the Eurovision Song Contest 1971. She won the selection, so she represented Spain in Eurovision with the song "En un mundo nuevo" where she placed second, bested only by Monaco's contestant Séverine with her song "Un banc, un arbre, une rue". She recorded "En un mundo nuevo" also in French (Note: As "Un monde plus grand et plus beau"), German (Note: As "Wir glauben an morgen"), English (Note: As "Tomorrow I'm coming your way"), and Italian (Note: As "Un mondo nuovo"). After Eurovision she starred in the same-titled film En un mundo nuevo, which was inspired by her participation at the contest and which shows real footage of it. At the end of the yé-yé years she moved to Mexico where she became moderately successful singing rancheras. She is still performing today.

In 2023, Karina was a celebrity guest in the episode Snatch Game - España Season 3 of the reality television show Drag Race España on ATRESplayer Premium. Also in 2023, she participated in the eighth season of the reality show Gran Hermano VIP on Telecinco, quitting after twenty-five days.

== Personal life ==
Karina was born in Jaén, Andalusia to Trinidad Santiago and Salvador Llaudes. She has been married four times and has two daughters. In recent years, she was diagnosed with thyroid cancer but has since made a full recovery.

== Discography ==
=== Selected LP ===
- 1966: "Karina Vol. I"
- 1968: "Karina Vol. II"
- 1970: "Karina Vol. III"
- 1970: "Colores"
- 1971: "Pasaporte a Dublín"
- 1972: "Tiempo al tiempo"
- 1972: "Lo mejor de Karina"
- 1973: "Lo mejor de Karina"
- 1974: "Lady Elizabeth"
- 1974: "Juntos para ayudarte"
- 1978: "Karina"
- 1985: "El disco de oro de Karina"
- 1991: "Soy como soy"
- 1995: "Primera época (1961–1964)"

== Filmography ==
=== Film ===
- Escala en hi-fi (1963)
- El último sábado (1966)
- Los chicos del Preu (1967)
- Would You Marry Me? (1967)
- La chica de los anuncios (1968)
- ¡Viva la vida! (1969)
- En un mundo nuevo (1972)
- Camera Café, la película (2022)

=== Television ===
- Escala en hi-fi (1963–64, 7 episodes)
- Pasaporte a Dublín (1970, 12 episodes)
- Hostal Royal Manzanares (1997, 1 episode)
- Gran Hermano VIP (2023, 25 days)

== See also ==
- List of yé-yé singers

Preceded by Julio Iglesias with "Gwendolyne"	Spain in the Eurovision Song Contest; 1971	Succeeded by Jaime Morey with "Amanece"
