= César Bono =

Mexican film actor and comedian

Cėsar Bono
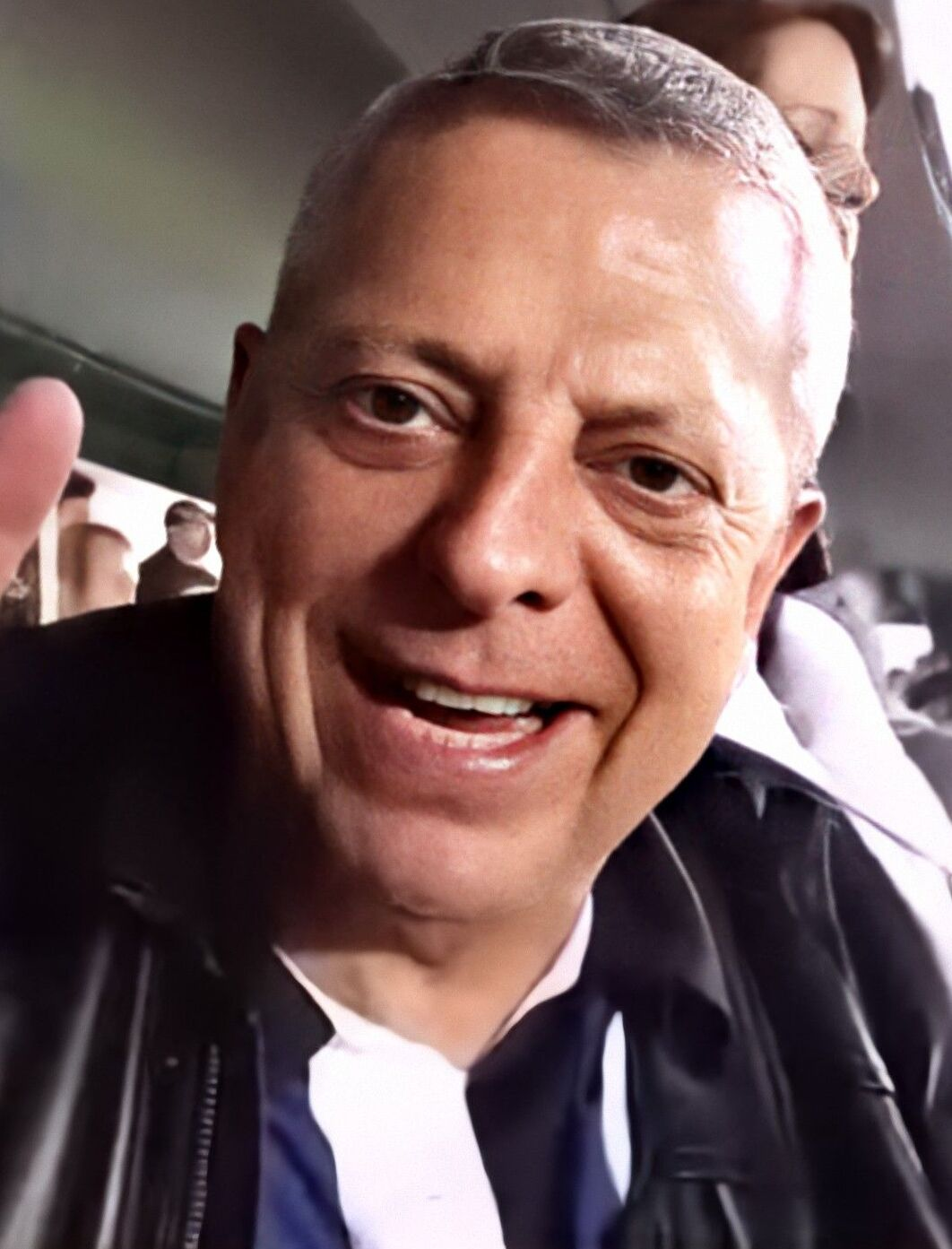
- Bono in 2015
- Born: César Queijeiro Bono; October 19, 1950 (age 74); Mexico City, Mexico
- Occupation(s): Actor, comedian

César Queijeiro Bono (born October 19, 1950), better known as César Bono, is a Mexican film and television actor and comedian. He is better known for his participation in Mexican sex-comedy films and for his role of Frankie Rivers in Mexican sitcom Vecinos.

== Biography ==
Bono was born in Mexico City, Mexico. He is the son of César Queijeiro, Sr. and of María Rosa Bono.

As a young man, he practiced tennis and association football, the latter of which he played at a minor, local league.

=== Health problems ===
In his older age, Bono has suffered a series of health setbacks. On March 3, 2022, he was hospitalized at Hospital Español in Mexico City, after suffering a perforated duodenum in his small intestine.

Bono has survived eight brain strokes and one heart attack. As a consequence of his eight strokes, all of which took place during 2018, Bono cannot move the left side of his body.

== Career ==
Bono is a member of a group of actors and actresses (such as Andres Garcia, Rafael Inclan, Alfonso Zayas, Maribel Guardia, Sasha Montenegro, Carmen Salinas, Angelica Chain and others) who have appeared in a large number of Mexican sexy-comedy (or "Fichera") films and made that film genre an important part of their acting careers.

One of his best known works was as Frankie Rivers, in the television series Vecinos (Neighbors) and also for lending his voice to Mater into Latin Spanish in Cars, Cars 2 and Cars 3. Also, in 1983, he acted in the Mexican-Venezuelan film co-production Secuestro En Acapulco-Canta Chamo, alongside Venezuelan boy band Los Chamos.

=== Filmography ===
A partial list of Bono's credits:

==== Cinema ====
- Mirreyes contra Godínez 2: El retiro (2022) as Vicente
- Mirreyes contra Godínez (2019) as Vicente
- Cars 3 (2017) (Spanish voice-over) Voice of Mate
- Cars 2 (2011) (Spanish voice-over) Voice of Mate
- Los Pajarracos (2006) as El Champion
- Cars (2006) (Spanish voice-over) Voice of Mate
- Entre melón y me lames (2006)
- El dormilón (2000)
- El tesoro del Pilar (2000)
- Los Verduleros atacan de nuevo (1999)
- El regreso de la suburban dorada (1998)
- Juan Camaney en Acapulco (1998)
- Entre dos fuegos (1998)
- Un pájaro escondido (1997)
- El tratado me vale... Wilson (1995)
- La ley del cholo (1995)
- Tres cornudos apaleados (1995)
- Todo de todo (1994)
- La Negra Tomasa (1993)
- El Gandalla (1992)
- Los Verduleros 3 (1992)
- Curados de espantos (1992)
- Dos locos en aprietos (1991)
- Pelo gallo (1990)
- Para todas tengo (1990)
- La toalla del mojado (1990)
- Pandilleros asesinos (1990)
- Keiko en peligro (1990)
- La Taquera picante (1990)
- La Corneta de mi General (1989)
- Narcosatánicos asesinos (1989)
- Tenorio profesional (1989)
- La Venganza de Don Herculano (1989)
- 3 lancheros muy picudos (1989) as Armando
- Las calenturas de Juan Camaney (1988)
- La lechería de Zacarias (1986)
- Más vale pájaro en mano (1985)
- Secuestro En Acapulco-Canta Chamo (1983)
- D.F./Distrito Federal (1981)

==== Television ====
- Vecinos (2005)
- Beach Buggy Show (2012-2015) Voice of B'Zorp
- Betty en NY (2019)
- El Chapulin Colorado (1979)

== See also ==
- List of Mexicans
