= Yé-yé =

Style of pop music

- Stylistic origins: R&B; rock and roll; Beat; chanson; jazz; girl groups; traditional pop
- Cultural origins: Early 1960s, Western and Southern Europe
- Derivative forms: Bubblegum; sunshine pop; Shibuya-kei; twee pop

Regional scenes
- France; Spain; Portugal; Italy

Other topics
- Jovem Guarda; nueva ola

Yé-yé (French: [jeje]) or yeyé (Spanish: [ɟʝeˈʝe]) was a style of pop music that emerged in Western and Southern Europe in the early 1960s. The French term yé-yé was derived from the English "yeah! yeah!", popularized by British beat music bands such as the Beatles. The style expanded worldwide as the result of the success of figures such as French singer-songwriters France Gall, Jacqueline Taïeb, Sylvie Vartan, Serge Gainsbourg and Françoise Hardy. Yé-yé was a particular form of counterculture that derived most of its inspiration from British and American rock and roll. Additional stylistic elements of yé-yé song composition include baroque, exotica, pop, jazz and the French chanson.

== Origin ==
The yé-yé movement had its origins in the radio program Salut les copains (loosely translated as "Hello, mates" or "Hello, pals"), created by Jean Frydman and hosted by Daniel Filipacchi and Frank Ténot, which first aired in December 1959. The phrase "Salut les copains" dates back to the title of a 1957 song by Gilbert Bécaud and Pierre Delanoë, who themselves had little regard for the yé-yé music that the radio show typically featured. The program became an immediate success, and one of its sections, "Le chouchou de la semaine" ("This Week's Sweetheart"), became the starting point for most yé-yé singers. Any song that was presented as a chouchou went straight to the top places in the charts. The Salut les copains phenomenon continued with a magazine of the same name that was first published in 1962 in France, with German, Spanish, and Italian ("Ciao Amici") editions following shortly afterward.

"Radios were practicing a real hype, much more than today. We, the singers, were much, much less numerous than today – and there were fewer radios. It was also the heyday of Salut les copains, and the press played an extremely important role, it could promote beginners. I remember being on the front page of Paris Match very quickly, without being very well known or doing anything special for that; this would no longer be possible nowadays. In fact, in the 1960s, we saw the advent of the mass media. At the same time, fashion had assumed a considerable importance, which it had never before had. Singers like me became emblems of fashion, in addition to chanson, which helped to maintain notoriety."
—Françoise Hardy, Télérama, 2012.

Françoise Hardy performed on Mireille Hartuch's Le Petit Conservatoire de la chanson television show in February 1962 (a year before The Beatles recorded "She Loves You"), singing "La fille avec toi", which began with "Yeah yeah yeah yeah". After she finished, Hartuch remarked on the "yé yé" lyrics and asked her what they meant. The term was popularised by Edgar Morin in a July 1963 article in Le Monde.

== Yé-yé girls ==
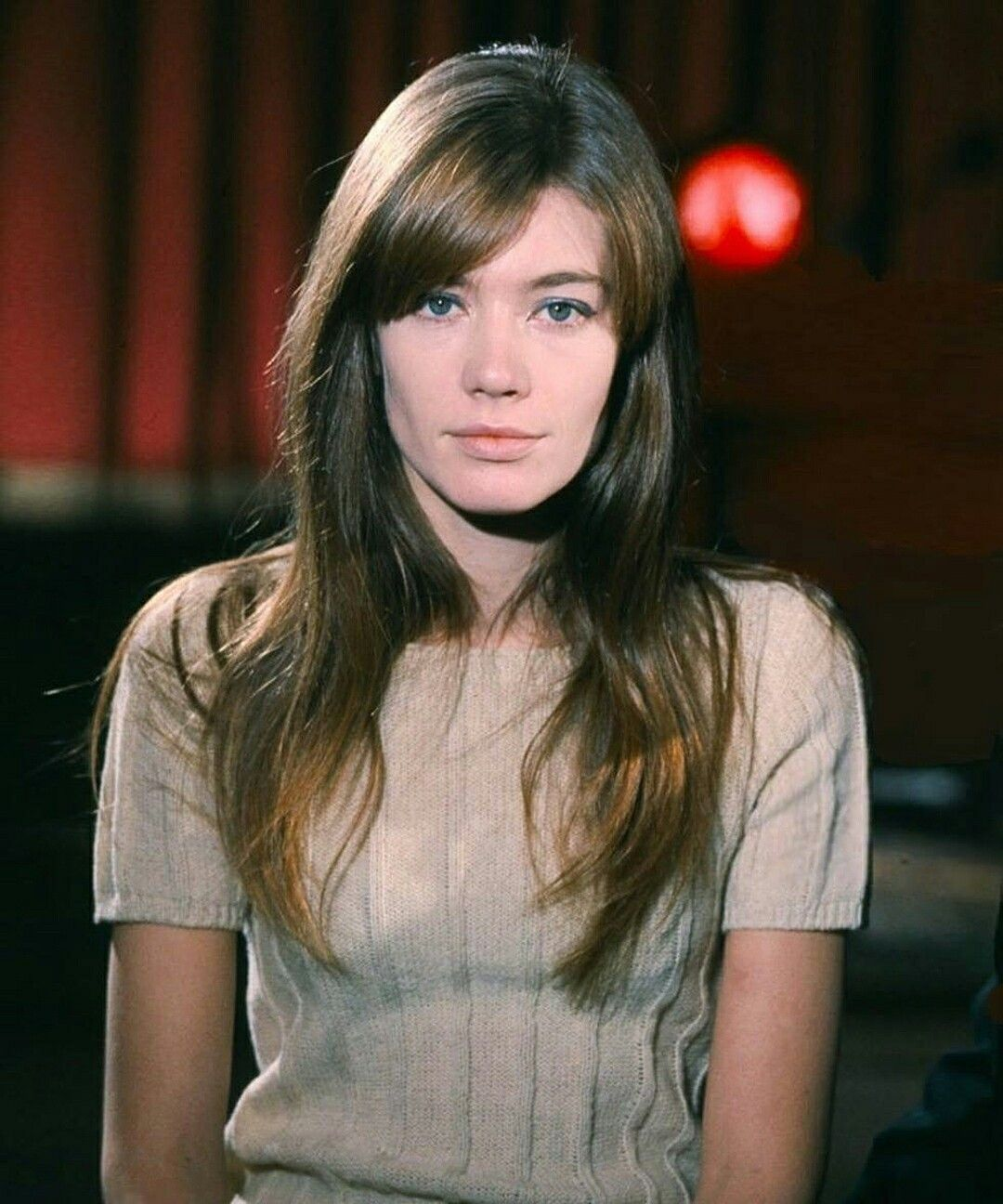
Françoise Hardy in 1966

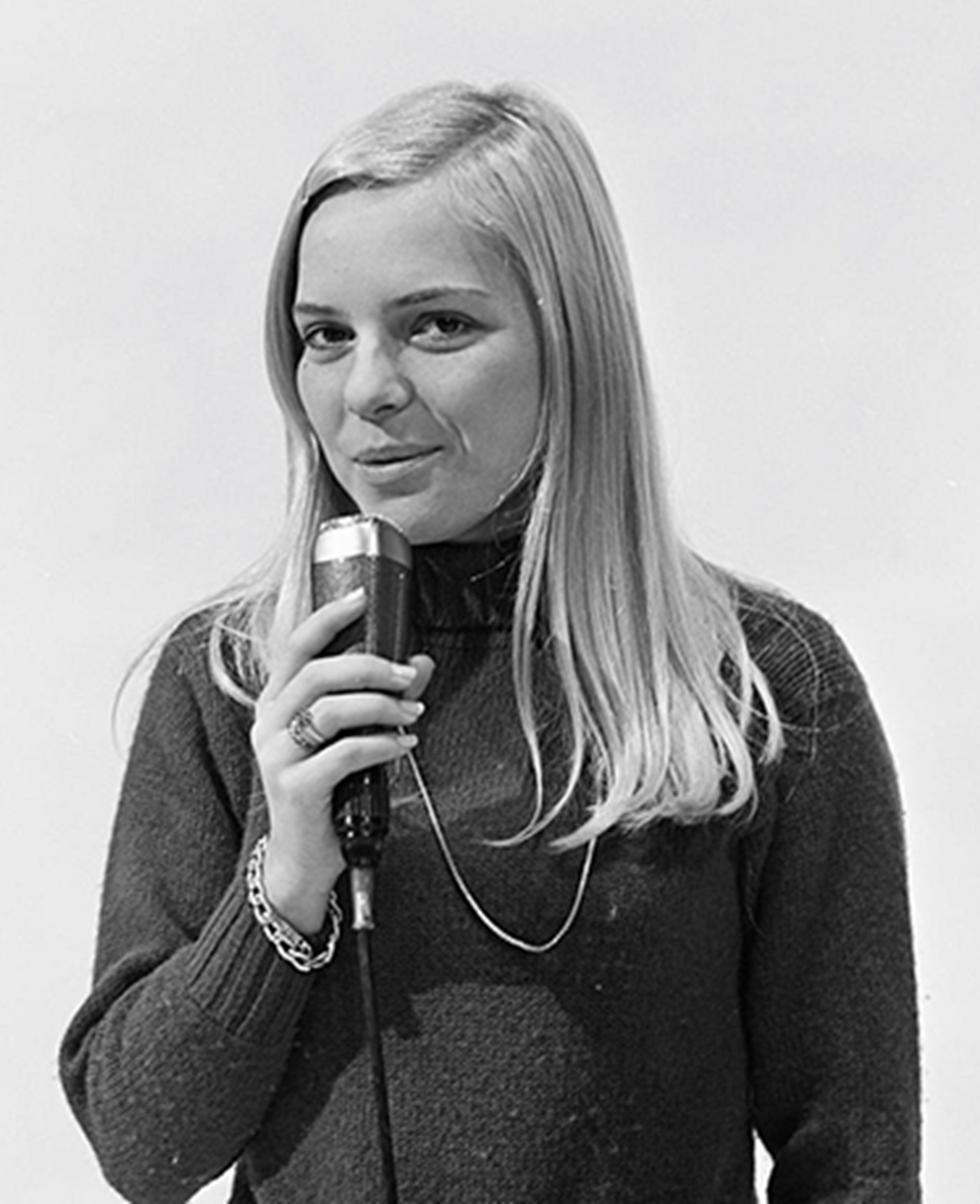
France Gall in 1968

Hardy and Gall are considered two of the most impactful artists of the Yé-yé music genre

Yé-yé music originated in France and was a mostly continental European phenomenon usually featuring young female singers. France Gall, for example, was only sixteen years of age when she released her first album and seventeen when she won the Eurovision Song Contest (for Luxembourg) singing the prototype bubblegum song "Poupée de cire, poupée de son".

France had a large market for the consumption of French-language songs at the time. Unlike other European nations such as West Germany, the French were more willing to support artists from their own country, singing in their native tongue. Some of the early French artists who were dabbling in rock and roll and similar genres, such as Johnny Hallyday, admit that they were creating an imitation of English-language rock music. Yé-yé helped assimilate that music in a unique, French way, and with the popularity of Salut les copains, the public began to see stars such as France Gall emerge.

While some Yé-yé songs had innocent themes such as that of Françoise Hardy's "Tous les garçons et les filles" ("All the guys and girls my age know how it feels to be happy, but I am lonely. When will I know how it feels to have someone?"), others were intentionally sexualised. Composer and singer/songwriter Serge Gainsbourg once called Gall the French Lolita and, wanting to exploit her innocence, composed for her the double-entendre song "Les sucettes" ("Lollipops"): "Annie loves lollipops, aniseed lollipops, when the sweet liquid runs down Annie's throat, she is in paradise." The lyrics of the song are blatantly phallic, and the music video essentially features a group of dancing penises.

Because female singers dominated the yé-yé scene, the movement is occasionally seen as a feminist statement, even though the songwriters behind the singers were men, and the songs often infantilized their singers. That said, in lieu of a desperate and codependent voice, a fun and flirtatious point of view was often depicted. Gall's 1966 song "Baby Pop," for example, adopts a playful attitude toward the traditional institution of marriage, singing "On your wedding night, it'll be too late to regret it."

Sylvie Vartan married rock star Johnny Hallyday in 1965 and toured in America and Asia, but she remained a yé-yé at heart, and as late as 1968 she recorded the song "Jolie poupée" ("Pretty Doll"), about a girl who regrets having abandoned her doll after growing up.

Sheila portrayed the image of a well-behaved young girl. Her first hit was "L'école est finie" ("School is over") in 1962.

In 1967, teen yé-yé singer Jacqueline Taïeb won the Best Newcomer award in Cannes at the Midem awards for her hit single "7 heures du matin".

Other significant girl singers of the era include teen TV star Christine Delaroche, Jocelyne, Zouzou, Evy, Cosette (Dominique Cozette) and Annie Philippe. Some girl groups emerged, such as Les Parisiennes, influenced by acts like the Shangri-Las.

=== Outside of France ===
Although originating in France, the yé-yé movement extended over Western Europe.

==== Italy ====
Yé-yé in Italy

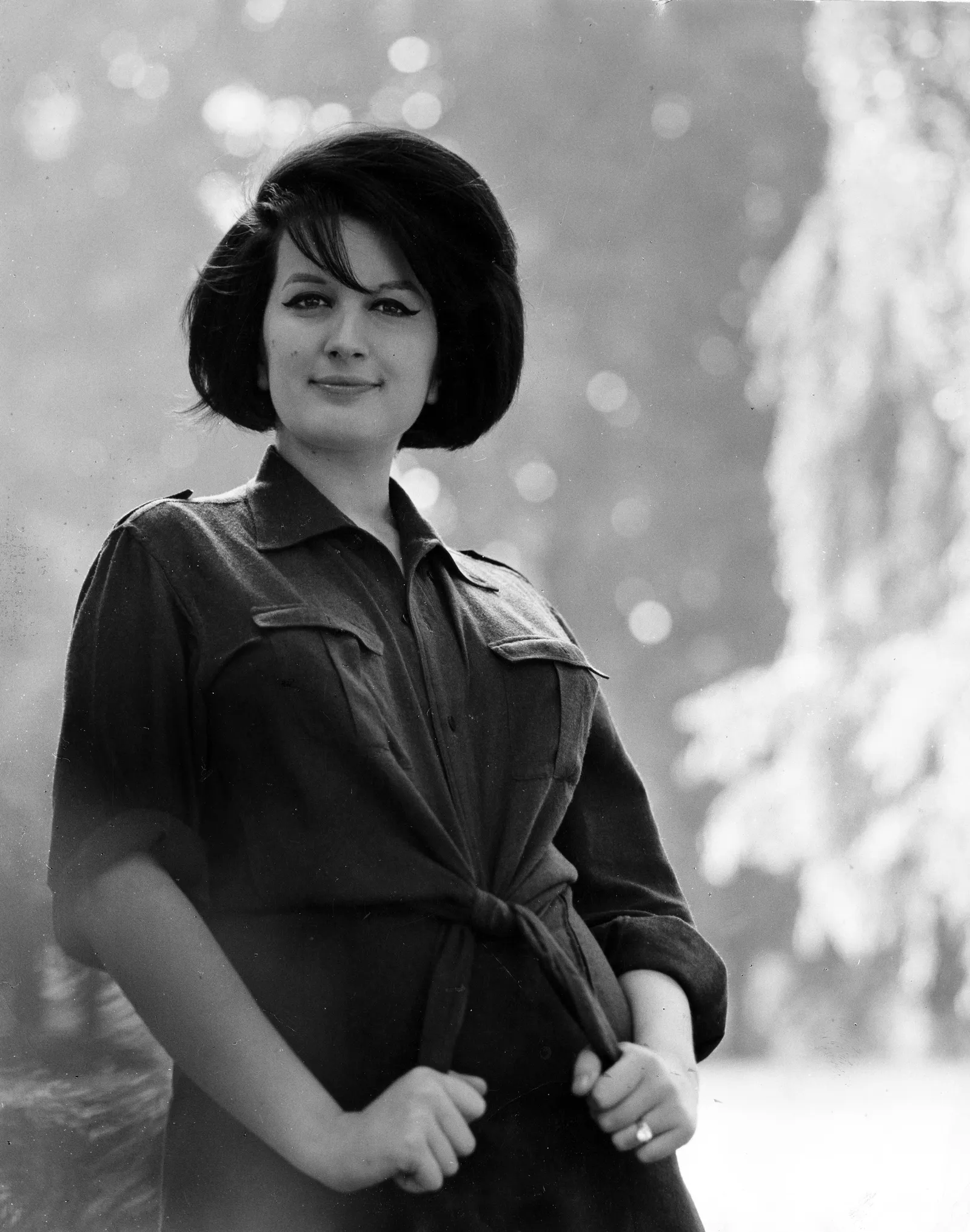
Mina in 1963

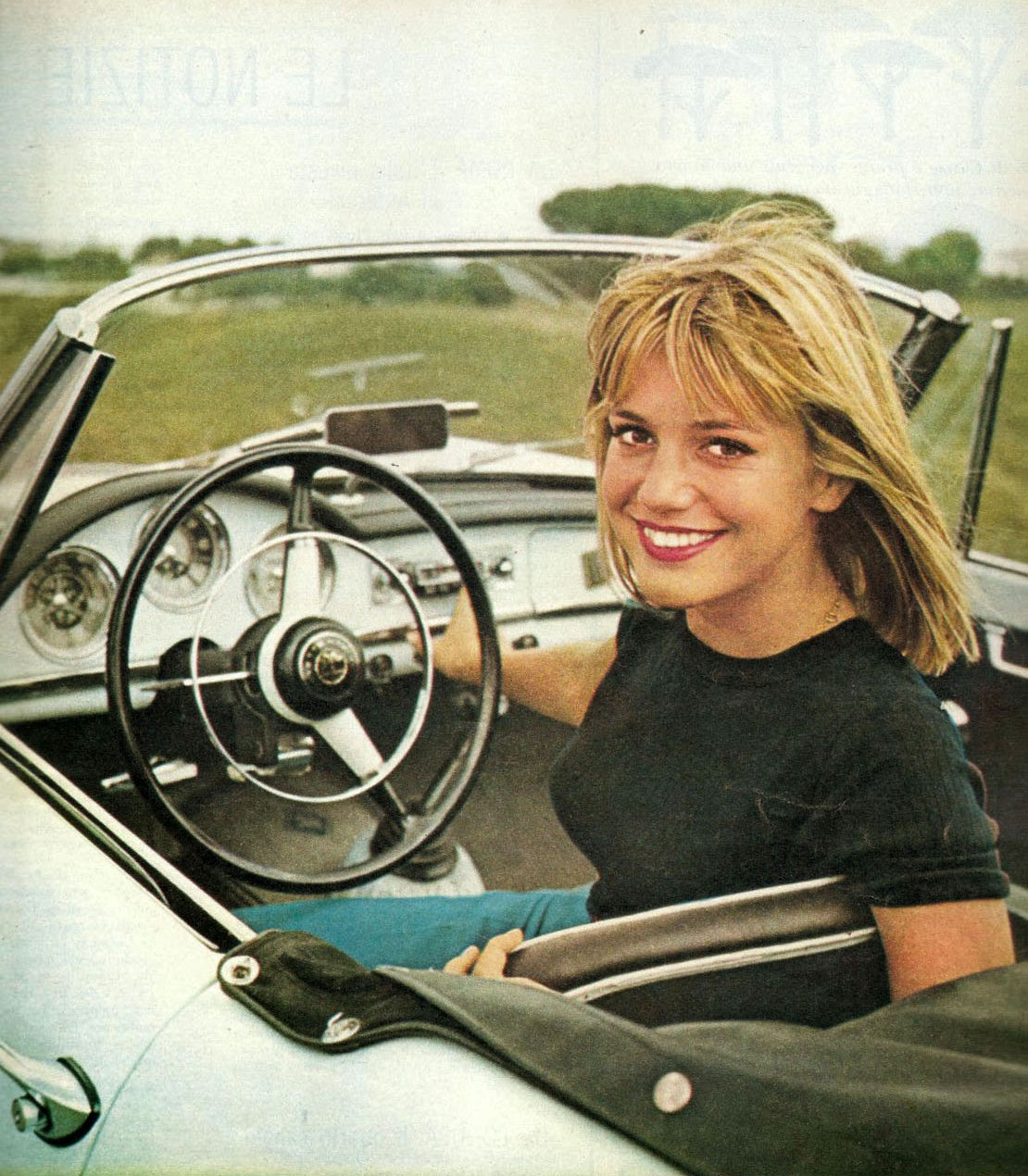
Catherine Spaak in 1962

Italian singer Mina became her country's first female rock-and-roll singer in 1959. In the following few years, she moved to middle-of-the-road girl pop. After her scandalous relationship and pregnancy with a married actor in 1963, Mina developed her image into that of a grown-up "bad girl". An example of her style may be found in the lyrics of the song "Ta-ra-ta-ta": "The way you smoke, you are irresistible to me, you look like a real man." By contrast, her compatriot Rita Pavone cast the image of a typical teenage yé-yé girl; for example, the lyrics of her 1964 hit "Cuore" complained how love made the protagonist suffer.

Parisian-born singer Catherine Spaak had a massive success in Italy with a style very close to that of Françoise Hardy. Other significant Italian yé-yé girls include Mari Marabini, Carmen Villani, Anna Identici and the girl groups Le Amiche, Le Snobs and Sonia e le Sorelle.

==== United Kingdom ====
British singer Sandie Shaw recorded Puppet on a String in 1967 and won the Eurovision Song Contest 1967, the first for the United Kingdom.

==== Spain ====
Yé-yé in Spain

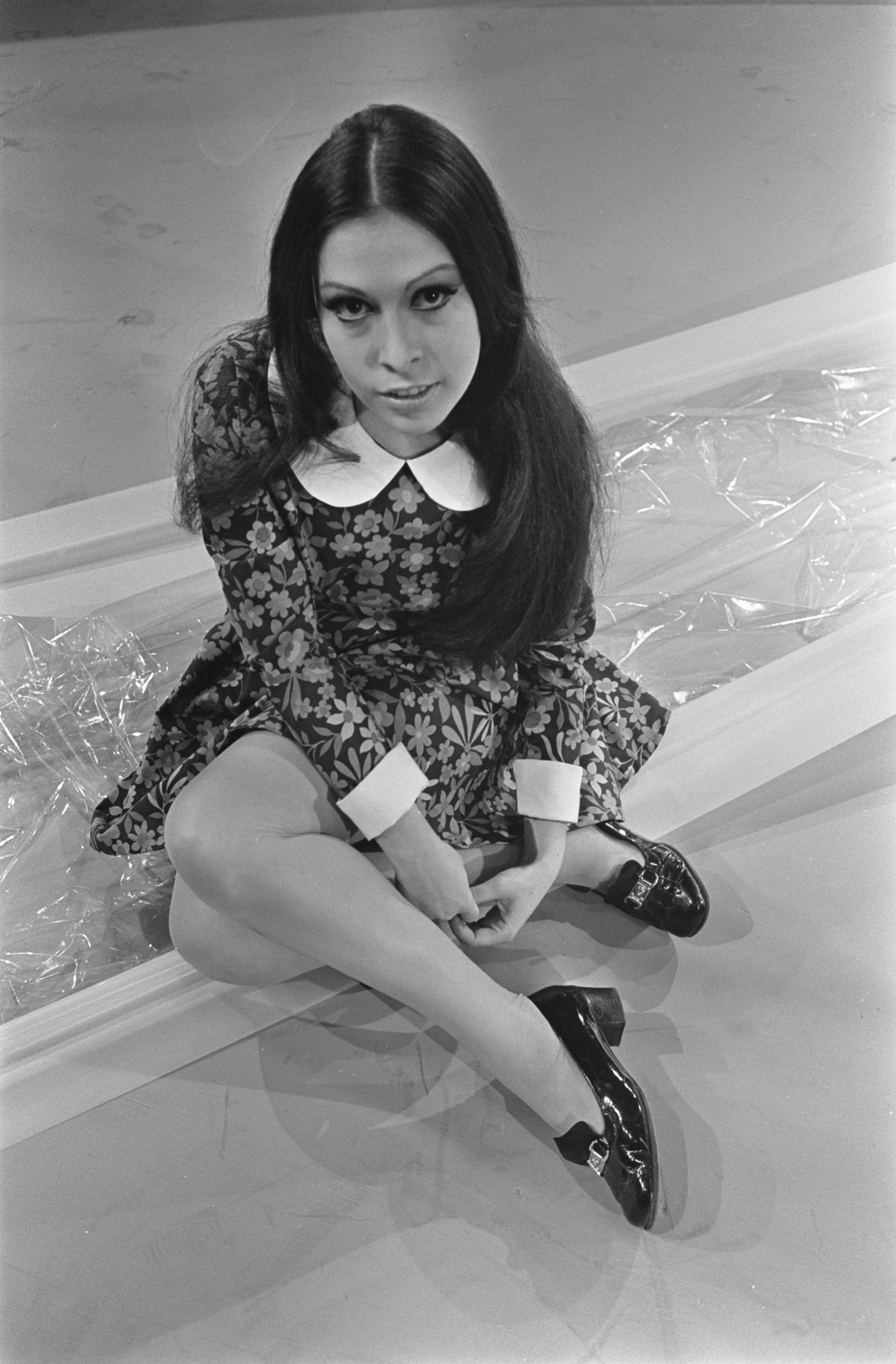
Massiel in 1968

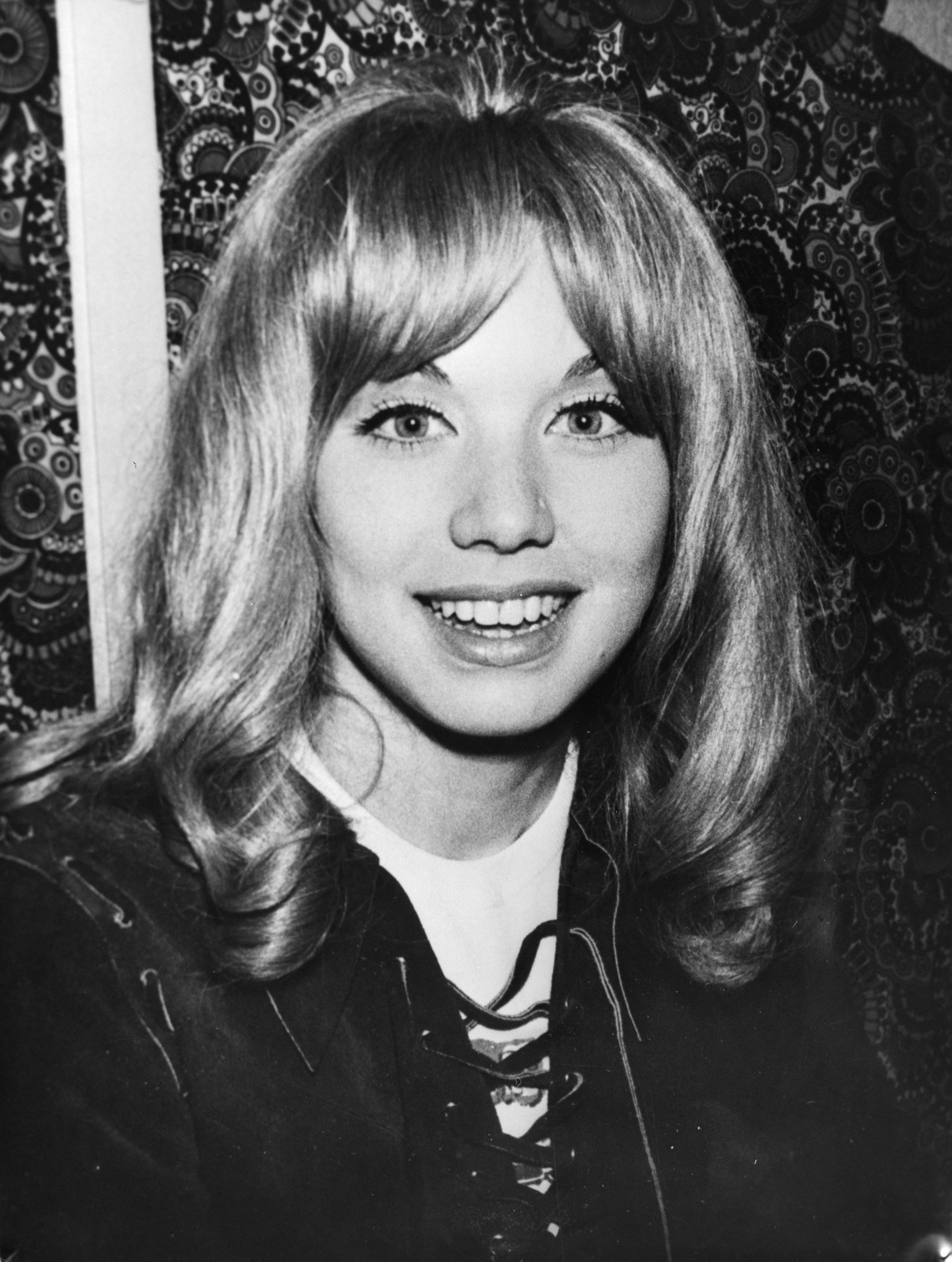
Karina in 1971

In Spain, which was under the rule of the Fascist Francoist regime, yé-yé music was at first considered to be incompatible with Catholicism. However, this did not stop the yé-yé culture from spreading, although a bit later than in the rest of Europe; in 1968 Spanish yé-yé girl Massiel won the Eurovision song contest with "La, la, la", while the sweet, naïve-looking singer Karina enjoyed success as the Spanish yé-yé queen with her hits "En un mundo nuevo" and "El baúl de los recuerdos". In the 1965 film Historias de la televisión, Concha Velasco's character, who competes against a yé-yé girl, sings La chica ye-ye ("The Yé-yé Girl"). The song became a hit, and Velasco is often remembered as la chica yeyé.

==== Japan ====
Yé-yé grew very popular in Japan and influenced the origins of Shibuya-kei and Japanese idol music. Gall recorded a Japanese version of "Poupée de cire, poupée de son". The film Cherchez l'idole, featuring Johnny Hallyday, has seen a Japanese DVD release. The yé-yé vocal group Les Surfs appear in the film performing their hit song "Ça n'a pas d'importance".

=== Yé-Yé revival ===
At the end of the 1970s, there was a brief but successful yé-yé recurrence in France, spreading across the charts of Western Europe with electro-pop-influenced acts such as Plastic Bertrand, Lio and Elli et Jacno and, in a harder rock vein, Ici Paris and Les Calamités (a subgenre dubbed "Yé-yé punk" by Les Wampas leader Didier Wampas). Lio had a string of hits during 1980, the most famous of which was "Amoureux Solitaires". This new brand of yé-yé, although short-lived, echoed the synthesizer-driven sound that had surfaced recently with new wave music.

== Yé-yé boys ==
While the yé-yé movement was led by female singers, it was not an exclusively female movement. The yé-yé masterminds (such as Serge Gainsbourg, who wrote several hits for France Gall, Petula Clark and Brigitte Bardot, but was considerably older and came from a jazz background) were distinct from the actual yé-yé singers. Michel Polnareff, for example, played the tormented, hopeless lover in songs such as "Love Me Please Love Me", while Jacques Dutronc claimed to have seduced Santa Claus's daughter in "La Fille du Père Noël". Among the more popular male yé-yé singers was Claude François, notable for songs such as "Belles, Belles, Belles", a French-language adaptation of the Everly Brothers' and Eddie Hodges' "(Girls, Girls, Girls) Made to Love".

In Portugal, the first yé-yé bands appeared in Coimbra in 1956, most notably Os Babies, led by José Cid. Other Portuguese bands followed afterward, including Os Conchas, Os Ekos, Os Sheiks, Os Celtas, Conjunto Académico João Paulo, Os Demónios Negros and singers such as Daniel Bacelar.

In Greece, the first pop-rock bands associated with the yé-yé culture appeared in the early 1960s, mainly in Athens and Thessaloniki. The most popular of those bands were the Forminx, the Sounds, the Charms, the Idols, and the Olympians. This scene also gave rise to the Greek Néo kýma movement, as well as to Greek rock music.

== Impact of yé-yé ==
Photograph of prominent artists of the yé-yé movement, shot by Jean-Marie Périer for Salut Les Copains on 12 April 1966. This image became a symbol of the yé-yé era and came to be known in France as the "photo of the century" (French: "photo du siècle").

The yé-yé movement maintains a particular prevalence in the music world because of its swinging, catchy rhythms and carefree lyrics. Unlike the confining strictures of society, yé-yé promoted a refreshing and invigorating newness and inevitably promoted a sort of sexual rebellion that greatly characterized the 1960s. Dalida's 1960 song "Itsi bitsi, petit bikini", previously recorded as "Itsy Bitsy Teenie Weenie Yellow Polkadot Bikini" by Brian Hyland, perfectly illustrated yé-yé's newfound nonchalance and release from prudish subject matter. The song, "...which denotes a nonchalant and undisciplined listening," is about a girl afraid to reveal her bikini to fellow beachgoers, and it represents the shocking aspect of the lax attitude toward an increased sexuality, especially for women, as bikinis were previously considered scandalous. Similarly, yé-yé contributed to the creation of a youth culture within a postwar France that expressed a certain playfulness and carefree perspective on life. Sociologist and philosopher Edgar Morin commented on the rise and popularity of yé-yé music and culture, "...seeing in yé-yé's frantic, syncopated rhythms simultaneously a commodified music...of adult consumption, and a festive, playful hedonism..."

As it was for any postwar youth culture, yé-yé acted as a creative outlet that aided in defining an era as well as an identity for Europe, specifically France. The archetype of la parisienne, exuding an exotic charm and magnetic appeal, was greatly defined by the influence of the numerous yé-yé girls within the scene and created an indelible mark in the worlds of both fashion and style. The "...escapist, ironic..." facets of yé-yé enticed thousands of listeners, promoting a gaiety and glamour that intertwined with the sexual freedom and modernity of the Swinging Sixties.

== In popular culture ==
- A 1964 Life article titled "Hooray for the Yé-Yé Girls" attempted to introduce three popular female yé-yé singers, Sylvie Vartan, Sheila and Françoise Hardy, to American readers. It erroneously implies that the term "yé-yé" is derived from the shouts of the crowds watching the performers.
- In her 1964 essay "Notes on "Camp"", Susan Sontag cited yé-yé as an example of an entire genre being annexed by the camp sensibility.
- The Italian title of the 1966 film Out of Sight was 007 1/2 agente per forza contro gli assassini dello yé yé.
- American singer April March brought back the yé-yé sound when she released the EP Chick Habit, a rewrite of the famous Serge Gainsbourg song "Laisse tomber les filles," and also recorded many other yé-yé-inspired songs both in the US and France.
- In 2012, French-Canadian actress Jessica Paré performed a version of "Zou bisou bisou" (originally sung by Gillian Hills) in the fifth-season premiere of the American television series Mad Men. Reaction to the song was such that the AMC network released the song as a single in digital download and vinyl formats.
- Also in 2012, the song "Le Temps de l'amour" appeared in the movie, Moonrise Kingdom, being played on a small phonograph on the beach as 12-year-old orphan Sam Shakusky (played by Jared Gilman) dances comically with his love interest, Suzy Bishop, also 12 (played by Kara Hayward). The song was performed by Françoise Hardy on her album "Tous les garçons et les filles," with writing credits to Jacques Dutronc, André Salvet and Lucien Morisse.
- Swedish band Therion released a cover album called Les Fleurs du Mal, composed mostly of symphonic metal versions of yé-yé songs.

== See also ==
- List of yé-yé singers
