= H2O (Puerto Rican band) =

Puerto Rican boy band active during the early 1990s

H_{2}O was a Puerto Rican boy band that had some success during the early 1990s. The band had some hits such as "Nena" and "Si Esto No Es Amor", which they sang on Raul Velasco's show Siempre en Domingo in Mexico, and others.

The band was active from 1991 to 1995, releasing 5 albums for CBS Records, Sony Music, Fonovisa and Italian music company Leader.

== See also ==
- Menudo
- Los Chicos de Puerto Rico
