= The Night Walkers =

Puerto Rican garage rock band

- Also known as: Los Night Walkers
- Origin: Mayagüez, Puerto Rico; San Juan, Puerto Rico
- Genres: Proto-punk; garage rock; rock en Español
- Years active: 1965–1971
- Labels: Inca, Triunfo, Borinquen
- Members: Oscar Solo (lead vocals) 1965-1968; Gilberto "Gil" Rivera (guitar, vocals, director); Fernando Ayala (guitar, vocals, arranger); Felix Ayala (bass guitar, composer, vocals); Enrique "Kiko" Rivera (drums, vocals); Jose "Pepito" Valentin (guitar, vocals); Jose Raul Feliciano (guitar, vocals); Milton Segarra (guitar, vocals)

The Night Walkers (also billed as "Los Night Walkers", and "The Nightwalkers") were a Puerto Rican garage rock band during the 1960s and 1970s, and were part of the Nueva Ola scene.

== Band formation ==
Originally from Mayaguez, The Night Walkers were discovered by music impresario, Alfred D. Herger. The group debuted in San Juan on the television program, "Kaleidoscopio", and frequently appeared on shows such as "El Club De Las 5", "Fin De Semana Musical", "El Show De Iris Chacon", and with Chucho Avellanet. Their debut album, Introducing The Night Walkers, was released in 1968 on the Puerto Rican record label, Inca. Members of the band included singer Oscar Solo, brothers Felix Ayala on bass guitar and Fernando Ayala on lead guitar, Jose "Pepito" Valentin on guitar and Enrique "Kiko" Rivera on drums. In 1970, they had success with "Tema de la telenovela 'Natacha'", their version of the theme song from the Peruvian telenovela, Natacha, which was sung by Gil Rivera. 'Natacha' was considered one of the first international hit telenovelas (Simplemente María, 1968, being the first), and the song became popular throughout Latin America and among the Puerto Rican / Hispanic communities in the US.

== Band dissolution ==
After years of touring across the U.S., and Latin America, The Night Walkers disbanded in the early 1970s.

== Discography ==
- 1968 – Introducing The Nightwalkers (Inca 1-1004)
- 1969 – Night Walkers (Triunfo TS-2)
- 1970 – Natacha (Borinquen DG-1169)
- 1971 – El Gordo (Borinquen DG-1200)
