= Annie Philippe =

French pop singer (born 1946)

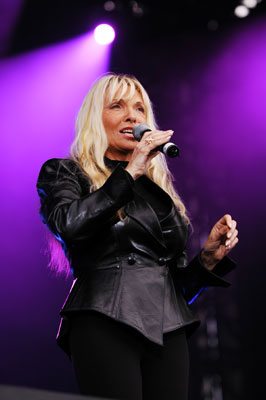
- Annie Philippe performing in 2006

Background information
- Born: 17 December 1946 (age 79); Ménilmontant, Paris, France
- Genres: Pop, yé-yé
- Occupation: Singer
- Years active: 1965–1969, 2001–2010s

Annie Philippe (born 17 December 1946) is a French pop singer.

== Biography ==
She was born in the Ménilmontant district of Paris. After leaving school she worked in a nightclub near the Champs-Élysées, where she met composer and arranger Paul Mauriat, who encouraged her singing career and helped her win a contract with the Rivièra label.

Her first EP in 1965 included "Vous pouvez me dire" (a version of "He Don’t Want Your Love Anymore", first recorded by Lulu) and "Une rose", a version of "Love Me Tender". She had some success in the French pop charts over the next few years with songs including her version of "Baby Love", the girl group influenced "J’ai raté mon bac", the more downbeat "Ticket de quai", and "Je chante et je danse" which featured a jazzy Hammond organ arrangement. In 1966 she moved to the Philips label, and had hits in France with "Mes amis, mes copains", "C'est la mode", "Le mannequin", and "Tu peux partir où tu voudras", a version of John Phillips' song "Go Where You Wanna Go". She also started writing her material, including "Lettre pour Annie". Her last chart hit came in 1967 with "Les enfants de Finlande".

Her style was often compared to France Gall. Writer Richie Unterberger says that her records had "that same consciously over-cute girlish delivery, bouncy tunes, and (perhaps inadvertently) eclectic production, in which Spectorian arrangements, American girl-group influences, smooth mainstream French pop orchestrations, melancholy ballads, groovy jazzy organs, bad Dixielandesque show tunes, and more all swam in the same stream... [but] her material was not quite as interesting..".

In 1968, she teamed up with singer Claude François for a series of duets, and she toured with Jacques Dutronc before taking a break from music in 1969. She attempted a comeback in the late 1970s with a Dolly Parton song. Starting in 2001, she toured with Frank Alamo. She later performed as part of the touring show Âge tendre, la tournée des idoles, featuring performers from the 1960s and 1970s.

A compilation of her recordings, L'Integrale Sixties, was issued on CD in 1999.
