= Jacqueline Taïeb =

French singer (born 1948)

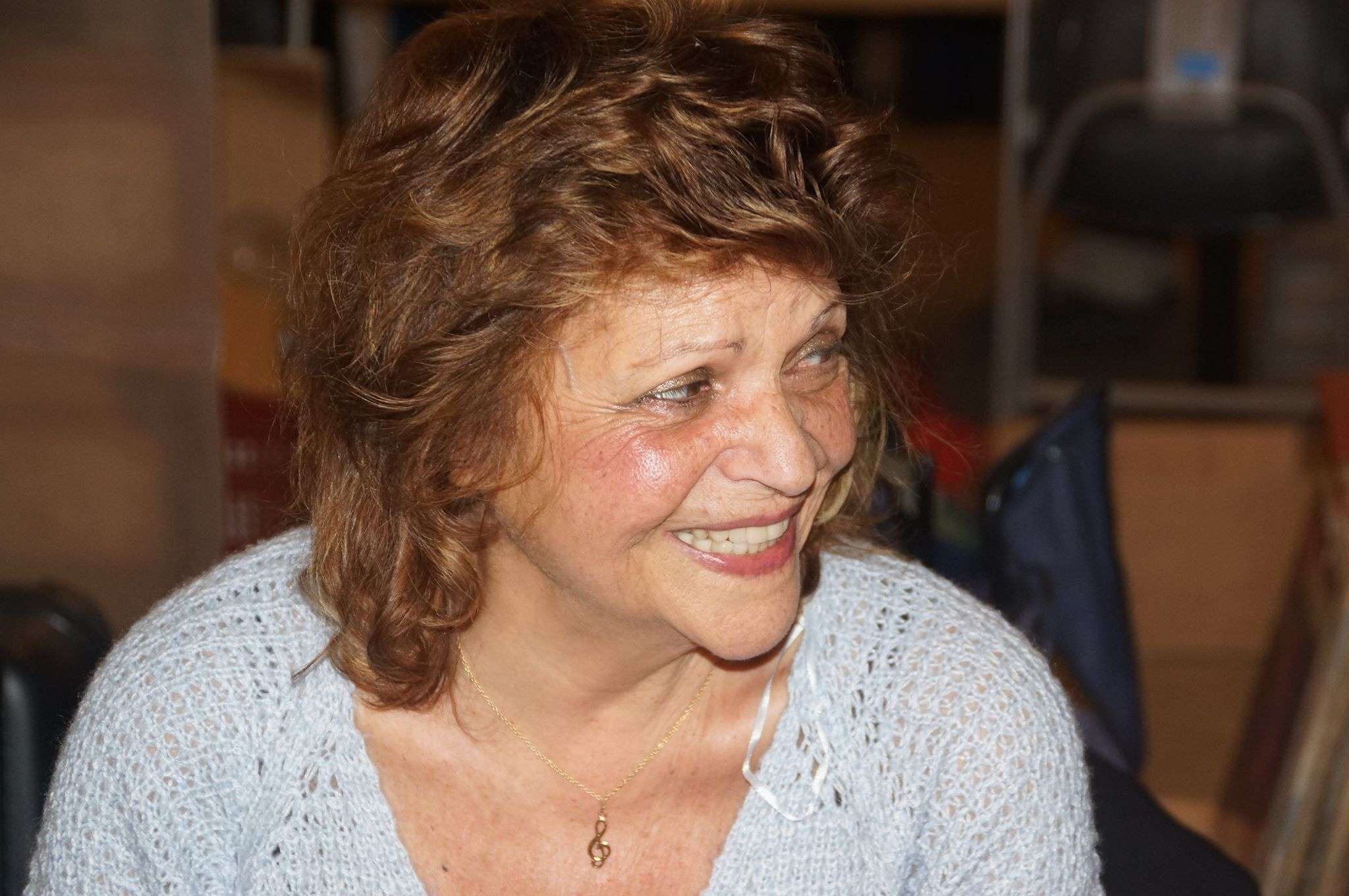
- Taïeb in 2020

Background information
- Born: 9 November 1948 (age 77); Tunis, French protectorate of Tunisia
- Genres: French pop, yé-yé
- Occupations: Singer-songwriter, musician
- Instruments: Vocals, guitar
- Label: Impact

Jacqueline Taïeb (born 9 November 1948) is a French singer and songwriter. She achieved her greatest success as a pop and yé-yé singer in the 1960s.

== Biography ==
Taïeb arrived in France from Tunisia in 1956 with her Jewish parents at age eight. She began composing songs with her guitar at 12 and, in 1966, was discovered by a talent scout while singing with friends. After arriving in Paris, she signed to Impact Records and released the song "7 heures du matin" in 1967, which became her biggest French hit. She was voted Best Newcomer at the inaugural Midem music festival in Cannes for the song. The song was about a bored teenage girl who does not wish to go to school that day and fantasizes about rock and roll stars such as The Who and Paul McCartney.

In the early 1970s, Taïeb took a break from recording. In 1988, she penned the song "Ready to Follow You", which became an international hit for American singer Dana Dawson. The single sold more than 500,000 copies, and the album sold 300,000 in France alone.

== Discography ==
Songs

- 1967: "7 heures du matin"
- 1967: "Bienvenue au pays"
- 1967: "Ce soir je m'en vais"
- 1967: "La plus belle chanson"
- 1967: "Bravo"
- 1967: "Juste un peu d'amour"
- 1967: "On roule à 160"
- 1967: "Le cœur au bout des doigts"
- 1967: "Qu'est-ce qu'on se marre à la fac"
- 1967: "La première à gauche"
- 1967: "Bientôt tu l'oublieras"
- 1967: "Le printemps à Paris
- 1967: "La fac des lettres"
- 1968: "Tonight I'm Going Home"
- 1968: "7 AM"
- 1969: "Bonjour Brésil"
- 1969: "On la connait"
- 1969: "À chacun sa vie"
- 1969: "Lui"
- 1971: "Il faut choisir"
- 1971: "Pourquoi t'es pas chez toi?"
- 1978: "Printemps à Djerba"
- 1978: "Et la vie"
- 1979: "Maman, jusqu'où tu m'aimes?"
- 1979: "Le p'tit air"
- 1979: "J'suis pas nette"
- 1979: "Qu'est-ce que je peux faire?"
- 1979: "La petite fille amour"
- 1980: "Je cherche quelqu'un"
- 1980: "Dis-moi des bêtises"
- 1983: "Les chanteurs disent la vérité"
- 1983: "J'vais pas pleurer tout l’temps"
- 2005: "Mon chat"
- 2005: "Mon prince d'Internet"
- 2007: "Partir à Amsterdam"
- 2015: "Peace Love & Action"
