= En un mundo nuevo =

1971 song by Karina

Single by Karina
- Language: Spanish
- Released: 1 March 1971
- Genre: Ballad
- Label: Hispavox
- Composer: Rafael Trabucchelli
- Lyricist: Tony Luz

Eurovision Song Contest 1971 entry
- Country: Spain
- Artist: María Isabel Bárbara Llaudés Santiago
- As: Karina
- Language: Spanish
- Composer: Rafael Trabucchelli
- Lyricist: Tony Luz
- Conductor: Waldo de los Ríos

Finals performance
- Final result: 2nd
- Final points: 116

Entry chronology
- ◄ "Gwendolyne" (1970)
- "Amanece" (1972) ►

"En un mundo nuevo" (Spanish pronunciation: [en um ˈmundo ˈnweβo]; English: "In a New World") is a song recorded by Spanish singer Karina with music composed by Rafael Trabucchelli and lyrics written by Tony Luz. It represented Spain in the Eurovision Song Contest 1971 held in Dublin, placing second.

Karina recorded the song in Spanish, English, French, German, and Italian.

== Background ==
=== Conception ===
"En un mundo nuevo" was composed by Rafael Trabucchelli with lyrics by Tony Luz. It is an up-tempo number about the importance of keeping one's faith and hope for a new and better world, a world in which love and truth will prevail.

=== Eurovision ===
Between 17 October and 26 December 1970, Televisión Española (TVE) produced a musical competition –titled Pasaporte a Dublín– to select its performer for the 16th edition of the Eurovision Song Contest. Karina won the competition so she became the Spanish performer for Eurovision. The song "En un mundo nuevo" was later internally selected for her. She recorded it in five languages: Spanish, English –as "Tomorrow I'm Coming Your Way"–, French –as "Un monde plus grand et plus beau"–, German –as "Wir glauben an morgen"–, and Italian –as "Un mondo nuovo"–.

On 3 April 1971, the Eurovision Song Contest was held at the Gaiety Theatre in Dublin hosted by Radio Telefís Éireann (RTÉ), and broadcast live throughout the continent. Karina performed "En un mundo nuevo" sixth on the night accompanied by Trío La La La –María Jesús Aguirre, Cristina Fernández, and Mercedes Valimaña– as backing singers, following Germany's "Diese Welt" by Katja Ebstein and preceding France's "Un jardin sur la terre" by Serge Lama. Waldo de los Ríos conducted the event's live orchestra in the performance of the Spanish entry. The first verse of the song could not be heard, since the sound engineer did not open Karina's microphone until the second verse.

At the close of voting, it had received 116 points, placing second in a field of eighteen. It was succeeded as Spanish entry at the 1972 contest by "Amanece" by Jaime Morey.

=== Aftermath ===
Karina starred in the 1972 film En un mundo nuevo, which was inspired by her participation at the contest and which shows real footage of her performance there.

== Chart history ==
Chart (1971)	Peak position
Spain (El Musical)	3

== Legacy ==
=== Cover versions ===
- Belgian singer Micha Marah recorded the song in Dutch as "Die heerlijke wereld".

=== Other performances ===
- Alaska performed the song in the show Europasión, aired on La 1 of Televisión Española on 21 May 2008 to choose by popular vote the best song that Spain has sent to Eurovision.

=== Impersonations ===
- In the twelfth episode of the seventh season of Tu cara me suena aired on 18 January 2019 on Antena 3, Soraya Arnelas impersonated Karina singing "En un mundo nuevo" replicating her performance at Eurovision.
