= La Pandilla =

Spanish teen music group of the 1970s

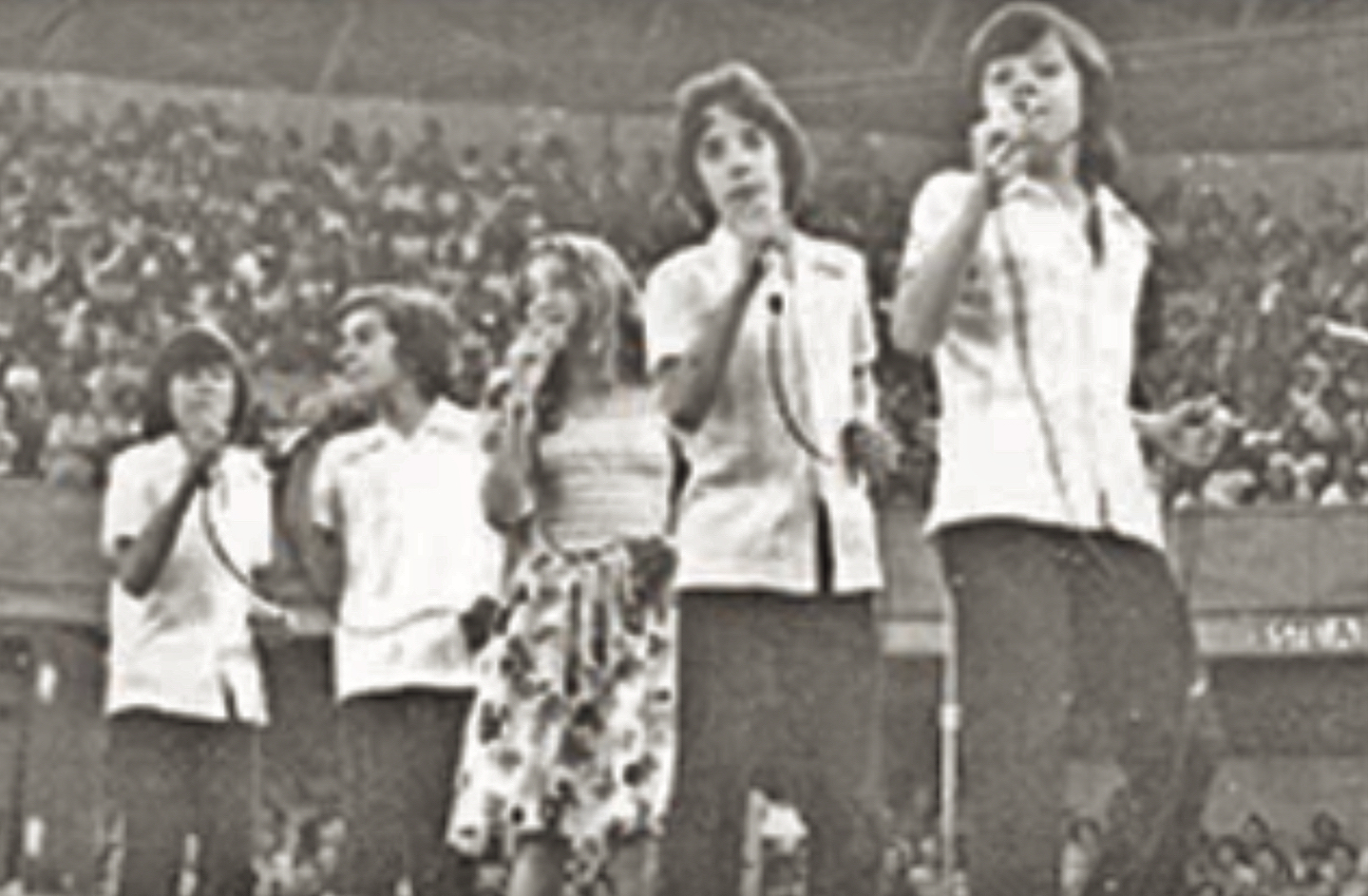
- A scanned photo from old family pictures of the Spanish group singing in San Juan, Puerto Rico, 1975

Background information
- Origin: Spain
- Genres: Kids, pop
- Years active: 1970–1977

La Pandilla were a Spanish teen music group of the 1970s, founded in 1970 by Pepa Aguirre. The group had members of both sexes, unlike most pop groups at the time.

Aguirre's son, daughter, and niece formed the band; later, two more boys were added. Their first album, Villancicos, was released in late 1970.

La Pandilla had initially a big impact in their home country of Spain. After a personnel change as some of the original members grew up, they experienced some backlash in the country for their song "El Alacrán" ("The Scorpion"), an innocent pop tune that made a coincidental reference to a clandestine group that was one of Francisco Franco's staunchest opponents. Franco's censors objected to the group, so they started touring Latin America more frequently.

Their appeal to youth in some Latin American countries bordered on collective hysteria, a reaction that evoked that of Beatlemania in the mid-1960s. During the 1970s, it was common to see La Pandilla-related items such as notebooks, posters, magazines, notebook covers, rulers, and dolls at department stores all over the Spanish-speaking countries. There were also two movies which were primarily centered around the band, named Operacion Alacran and La Pandilla en Apuros. La Pandilla's film debut took place in 1972's En un mundo nuevo but in this film, the band played secondary roles. Operación Alacrán sold well.

La Pandilla was chiefly instrumental in the later success and development of one of history's most legendary boy bands: Menudo. In 1973, the future founder of Menudo, Edgardo Diaz, who was a medical student in Spain and lived next door to the Aguirreses, joined the band's entourage as a sound expert. Diaz turned out to be the bridge between La Pandilla and Puerto Rico, the country where La Pandilla's success was longest-lived. Thanks in part to him, Alfred D. Herger—who became known as the biggest pandillero in Puerto Rico—and Felix Santiesteban, the group became a teen favorite in the Caribbean island. Diaz became manager in 1974. In 1975, the band was received by a huge crowd of Puerto Rican fans at the Iberia Airlines terminal at Luis Muñoz Marín International Airport at San Juan. Similar receptions took place in the Dominican Republic, Guatemala, Panama, Venezuela and other countries.

The definitive lineup of close-knit group La Pandilla literally grew up together, along with their fans. This eventually became a liability, as the youngest members' voices matured which made their original sound difficult to produce. Another liability, at least in Diaz's view, was that of having a female singer, Mari Blanca, for whom separate lodging, security, and chaperone arrangements were always necessary. This prompted Díaz to leave the management of the group and set up yet another, this time in his native Puerto Rico, in which only young males under age 15 would be used, to be replaced as they aged. After Diaz left and formed Menudo, La Pandilla's popularity slowly declined.

Former member Javier Martínez died from cancer on 29 June 2023, at the age of 63.

== Discography ==
- 1970 Villancicos (original members: Santi and Nieves Martínez, Blanca Ruiz, Carlos and Javier Martínez])
- 1970 "Capitan de Madera" (single) (original members)
- 1970 La Pandilla va al Teatro (original members)
- 1970 -Chi-Li-Pu (original members)
- 1971 ¡Oh Mamá! (original members)
- 1972 Amarillo (original members)
- 1972 Cantemos con....La Pandilla en Navidad (original members)
- 1973 "Nuestra Pandilla" (single) (original members)
- 1973 "Chiripitiflautico" (single) (original members)
- 1973 "Walt Disney" (single) (original members)
- 1974 El Alacran (with new members Ruben and Javi Lopez, Gaby Jimenez)
- 1975 Tomame o Dejame (same as above)
- 1976 Bakala Nanu Meme (same as above)
- 1976 Puerto Rico (same as above)
- 1977 Gaby, Ruben, Javi, Blanca, Javier (same as above)

== Band members ==
- Santi Martínez (1970–1974), son of Pepa Aguirre, now married to famous singer Maria Caneda, executive for Disney music in Spain. Became a member of Tradición after leaving La Pandilla. Tradición included all Aguirre brothers and sisters, including Nieves. Became a member of La Pequeña Compañía in the early 1980s, representing Spain in the 1982 OTI Festival with them.
- Nieves Martínez (1970–1974), daughter of Pepa Aguirre, married with an Iberia Airlines executive. Was a member of Tradición with her brother Santiago.
- Mari Blanca Ruiz Martínez (1970–1977), niece of Pepa Aguirre, now a veterinarian.
- Juan Carlos Martínez (1970–1974), no relation to Santi and Nieves, lived in Puerto Rico many years, has since returned to Spain and works at a professional marketing firm.
- Javier Martínez (1970–1977), brother of Juan Carlos, he worked in finance and investments. He died on 29 June 2023.
- Francisco Javier López, Javi (1974–1977), twin brother of Rubén López, now a surgeon
- Ruben Lopez (1974–1977), never married, now a surgeon like his twin brother
- Gabriel Jiménez González (1974–1977), Gaby, now an actor, and voice dubbing talent in his native country.

== Television series ==
Puerto Rican actor and singer Juan Carlos Morales, who himself was once accepted by Menudo but who had to pull out of the group because his mother did not allow him to join it, announced in 2016, that he and Spaniard producing company El Trampolin are developing a television series largely based on both La Pandilla and Menudo's hits, about a male homosexual couple who adopt four boys and one girl and form a tribute band named #La Pandilla. The series, a sitcom named #La Pandilla, was tentatively set to debut on Spanish television during 2017.
