= Conexión Caribe =

1984 film directed by Orestes Trucco

Los Chicos en Conexión Caribe
- Directed by: Orestes Trucco
- Written by: Felipe San Pedro and Orestes Trucco
- Produced by: Ricardo Bauleo
- Starring: Los Chicos (Chayanne, Tony, Rey, Migue and Alex); Juan Manuel Lebrón, Otilio Warrington, Eileen Navarro, Millie Aviles, Ed Trucco
- Cinematography: Héctor Collodoro
- Edited by: Perfecto Orellano
- Music by: Pepe Luis Soto and Eddie Fernández
- Distributed by: Producciones Trucco, Inc.
- Release date: 1984
- Running time: 1:29
- Country: Puerto Rico
- Language: Spanish

Conexión Caribe is a 1984 film starring members of Los Chicos, a Puerto Rican boy band of the 1980s, Tony, Migue, Chayanne, Rey and Alex.

== Plot summary ==
Taking advantage of the fame of Los Chicos in Puerto Rico and Central America, and after the relative success of the movie Una Aventura Llamada Menudo, producer and director Orestes Trucco wrote a script for the movie aimed at the pre-teen and teen markets. Puerto Rican actors Juan Manuel Lebrón and Otilio Warrington starred as members of a mafia-type organization in charge of the so-called Conexión Caribe (Caribbean Connection). Movie starts at a concert location for Los Chicos where Migue, the oldest member of the band, was kidnapped prior to the show. This opportunity is used to introduce the new member of the band, Alex Rodríguez. After the concert, the band received a call to attend a port in Fajardo to rescue Migue. The members of the band escape police protection and they make their way to the port, where Migue is safely in a boat with a group of girls and ready for a vacation trip around the Caribbean. However, the owner and captain of the boat is also member of the plot, which eventually ends in another kidnap, a visit to Casa de Campo in Dominican Republic and the eventual return to a deluxe hotel in San Juan, where the secret operation is revealed: it was only a ploy to bring Los Chicos to Don Padrone's (Warrington) daughter 15th year birthday party. Furthermore, it is also revealed that the mafia-type organization was not such a thing but a group of policemen who are all friends and work undercover ("good guys", not "bad guys" as Lebron's character clarifies towards the end) instead. A special participation by Sandra Zaiter, spokesperson for Society of Handicapped Children and Adults, ends the movie with a diving exhibition by Los Chicos in an olympic-style pool.

== Facts about the film ==
- Film locations include former Escambrón swimming complex, Fajardo, Casa de Campo, Dominican Republic and the Condado Plaza Hotel, formerly Condado Holiday Inn.
- The Escambron swimming pool closed shortly after the movie was filmed. It became a condemned facility which eventually was imploded after the death of Liliana Barbarita Cepeda.
- Future San Juan Mayor Santini's wife Irma Garriga featured as one of the minor characters in the film.
- After the movie was completed and the soundtrack was recorded, three of the members of the group (including Chayanne) quit the group, alleging poor working conditions. The soundtrack for the movie was re-recorded by the new members. However, one of the songs sung by Chayanne was left as first recorded, so the album could be marketed as "Los Chicos featuring Chayanne", which clearly was the most popular member of the group.
- Movie was premiered on January 5, 1984. Only one of the original members (Tony) was present.
