= Alfred D. Herger =

Puerto Rican television host (born 1942)

Alfred Domingo Herger (born November 4, 1942) is a Puerto Rican television show host and a psychologist. He has been labeled the Ed Sullivan of Puerto Rico in local media, due to his strong influence on Puerto Rican popular culture and his success as a television presenter.

== Early life ==
Herger, of Spanish and German ancestry, was born in Arecibo, Puerto Rico and was raised in San Juan. As early as in 1958, while he was a teenager, he would provide local newspaper "El Mundo" with hit rankings of the most popular songs among San Juan youth. He would eventually become a radio disc jockey, renowned for his sense of humor and affable character.

== Establishing Nueva Ola ==
Herger was the originator and leader of the Nueva Ola music revolution of the 1960s in Puerto Rico. He became very famous across Puerto Rico with his daily television shows, which lasted until the late 1970s.

He helped the careers of many young singers of the time, such as, Chucho Avellanet, Lucecita Benítez, Sonia Noemí, Ednita Nazario, Lou Briel (Anexo 3), Zeny & Zory, Carmita Jiménez, The Night Walkers, and others. He was also responsible for bringing into Puerto Rico various visiting artists, including Tony Croatto (with his sister Nelly) and "Luisito Rey", the father of Latin American pop sensation Luis Miguel, who was born in Puerto Rico and for whom Herger was his godfather. He was a popular radio host during the mid- to late 1970s.

It was in the early 1970s that he befriended future Menudo creator Edgardo Díaz, who was working in Spain as manager of La Pandilla. Diaz contacted Herger about having La Pandilla go to Puerto Rico to make some recordings and be shown at Herger's show, and Herger accepted. Herger became such a large propulsor of that group in Puerto Rico that he garnered the nickname The biggest Pandillero becoming their agent and producing a series of sold-out concerts in Puerto Rico and the Dominican Republic. He also created a TV series with them and filmed two movies: "Operacion Alacran" and "La Pandilla en Apuros".

Later on in 1980, Herger produced and hosted a game show, La Pirámide, complete with an Egyptian-themed set and imagery, tons of bad pyramid puns and jokes in the program's scripts, and his entire family involved in the show. Herger's oldest son Alfredo and daughter Grace Marie went on to be successful teen show hosts in Puerto Rico on WAPA-TV's show Party Time. Grace Marie later became a part-time model and Alfredo attempted a career as a solo singer.

== Career as psychologist ==
Herger retired from radio and television to devote himself to his career as a psychologist during the mid 1990s. He had rebounded from depression after the murder of one of his children, Benny, in 1994. Benny was a minor player on "La Pirámide", and later attended Purdue University in Indiana. Visiting Puerto Rico during one of his winter breaks he was carjacked and murdered. Herger was deeply affected by his son's death but his inner search for sense from the whole experience gave him the motivation to complete a master's degree and a Doctor of Philosophy degree. His constant interest in youth themes made him popular as a youth counselor.

Grace Marie's first husband, physician Pedro Gracia Jr., suddenly died from an allergic reaction to shrimp at a dinner honoring him. This led some Puerto Ricans to believe that the Hergers were somehow cursed, in a way similar to that of the Kennedy Curse (some even blamed their stint producing "La Pirámide" and their irreverent treatment of Egyptian themes for their bad luck). Dismissing this as nonsense, Herger went on to produce self-help radio programs in which he was the host. He has since written four best selling books on self-help psychology since. Herger still exercises his profession as a psychologist at a private office in San Juan.

Adding to these tragedies, Herger's other son, former television show host Alfredo Herger, died following a gym workout, on May 29, 2019 at the age 51. Reports says his death was caused by an Abdominal aortic aneurysm.

Herger was honored by the Fundación Nacional para la Cultura Popular, which recognizes important figures of popular culture in Puerto Rico on August 13, 2008.

== See also ==
- List of Puerto Ricans
- German immigration to Puerto Rico
- Paquito Cordero
- Rafael Perez Perry
