= Los Chamos =

Venezuelan boy band

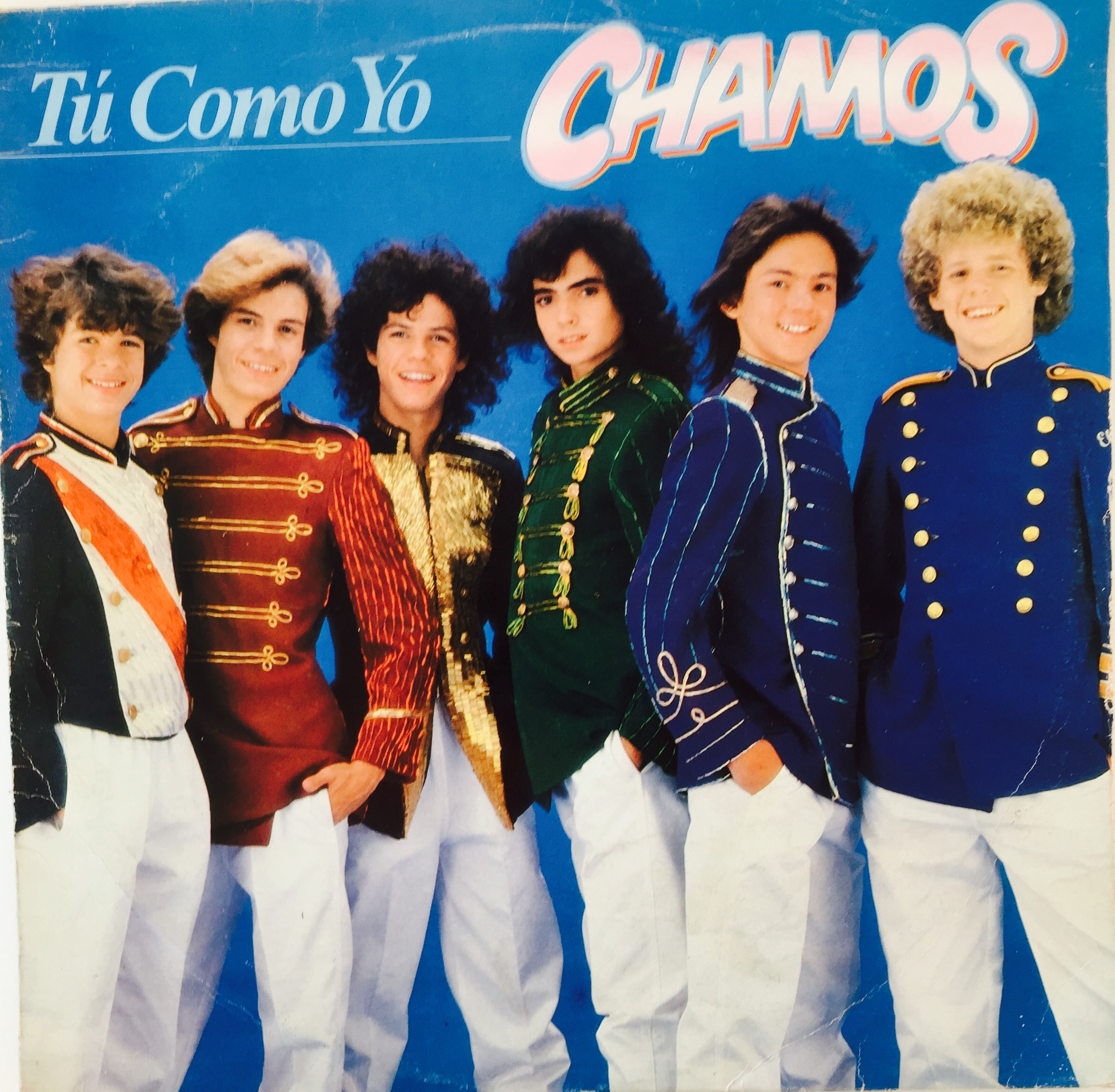
Los Chamos on the cover of their 1983 album Tú como yo.

Los Chamos were a Venezuelan boy band formed in Caracas in 1981 to rival Menudo's success. Los Chamos were made up of six members and released their first album, Los Chamos-El Soldadito, sponsored by channel 8 of Venezuelan National TV.

== Albums ==
In 1982, they released their second album called Siempre Te Amaré, which spanned the international hit “Canta Chamo”. That album went Gold and Platinum in many Latin American countries. That hit led them to sing at Mexico's Estadio Azteca, among other big venues in Latin America.

In 1983 they released a third hit album called Tú Como Yo, produced by famous singer and composer Rudy LaScala.

That same year Los Chamos released a blockbuster movie called Secuestro En Acapulco-Canta Chamo, alongside famous actresses Yuri (who is also a singer), and La Chilindrina.

== Later history and dissolvement ==
Los Chamos went on tour for many years through Mexico, the United States, Puerto Rico, the Dominican Republic, Central America, Panama, Colombia, Ecuador, Peru, etc. After that huge success, four group members alleged poor working conditions and left to pursue other musical endeavors. Four more boys were brought in to form Los Chamos' line up, and another album was released. The sudden, drastic line up change and new album weren't as positively received by the public, and Los Chamos dissolved soon after. They tried their hand at a fifth release in 1990, with six new members, and after that, Los Chamos officially called it quits.

Nowadays, some of the former members relocated and live in the United States, Mexico, Germany and Brazil. On August 28, 2018, Mexican television reporter Ana Maria Canseco announced on her webpage that former member Chamo Will Marquez Uzcategui, "Chamo Will", died unexpectedly from a respiratory condition in his native Venezuela.

== Members ==
=== 1981-1984 ===
- Ricardo Messina (sang on the first and second album; replaced by Chamo Gabriel)
- Argenis Brito
- Enrique Couselo
- Gabriel Fernandez (Replaced Ricardo Messina)
- Winston Márquez Uzcategui
- Will Márquez Uzcategui
- Walter Márquez Uzcategui
- Roger Martin (only sang on the first album and was replaced by Argenis Brito)
- Raul (only in the group for a short amount of time and didn't record with the group)

=== 1984-1987 ===
- Adolfo Cubas
- Cristóbal "Chris" Roges
- Enrico "Henry" Madia
- Gabriel Fernández
- Enrique Couselo
- Juan de León Santana

=== 1987-1991 ===
- Álvaro Novoa
- Ángel Guinness
- Bernard
- Carlos Baute
- Freddy
- Lino Martone
- Romulo Ortiz
- Jose Acedo (El Powers Inaki)

== Discography ==
- 1981: Los Chamos [Original Members: Ricardo Messina, Jesus Mercado, Enrique, Winston, William and Walter]
- 1982: Siempre Te Amare [Original Members]
- 1983: Tu Como Yo [Original Members]
- 1984: Chamo Soy [New Members: Adolfo, Chris, Manuel and Juan]
- 1990: Con un Poco de Amor [New Members: Alvaro, Angel, Bernald, Carlos, Freddy and Lino]

== See also ==
- Venezuelan music
