= Los Chicos =

Puerto Rican boy band

Los Chicos de Puerto Rico
- Also known as: Los Chicos de Puerto Rico
- Origin: Puerto Rico
- Genre: Pop rock
- Years active: 1978–mid 1980s

Los Chicos (also known as Los Chicos de Puerto Rico) were a Puerto Rican boy band that was popular in Puerto Rico, and in South and Central America during the early to mid 1980s, which was created to rival Menudo's success.

The band was created by Eric Laboy in 1978, with the name Encuentro. Due to the chosen name also being used as a political campaign slogan, the name was soon changed to Los Chicos, which translates to The Kids, by Carlos Alfonso Ramirez, who took ownership and managed the boy band.

A movie (Conexión Caribe) was filmed and a television show was hosted weekly on Puerto Rico's WAPA-TV. It continued a trend of boy bands starring in movies. Many songs, including "Puerto Rico son Los Chicos", "Vuelve", "Ave María", "Para Amar" and "Mamma Mia" sung by Jorge Lopez a.k.a. Giro Lopez or Giro became radio favorites, and memorabilia items like posters were mass-produced. Los Chicos became national sponsors for Malta Corona and Mahones Savage (Savage Jeans).

In October 1983, three of the original members, Rey, Migue and Chayanne, quit the group, alleging poor working conditions. Chayanne became a solo artist and released his first album in 1984. Carlos Alfonso took over the new group with original member Hector Antonio "Tony" Ocasio and three new group members (Tico Santana, Alejandro "Casito" Farinacci Fontecha, and Alejandro Rodriguez). However, this version did not have as much of the acceptance from the public as the first group of boys, and the band dissolved. While they never achieved Menudo's level of popularity, the group had success in Puerto Rico and other Latin American countries. During a televised concert in the Dominican Republic, Los Chicos had to abandon the stage because of fans reaching it.

== Post break-up ==
Los Chicos' most popular members were Chayanne (now an international superstar), Jorge Lopez, or Giro, who was signed to Sony Music and has had a long-term relationship with the label as a salsa artist with over 10 albums, many gold records and a Grammy Nomination. Giro is still performing and has released new albums with other labels; in 2010 he created Giro Productions, and with the help of Chino Rodriguez, now his manager, has released the latest album Todavia Hay Amor on OMG records and Giro Productions, Migue Santa (who became a helicopter pilot), Tony Ocasio and Rey Díaz. Currently Rey is working as a sales executive in a prominent firm at Puerto Rico. Future Menudo member Sergio Blass was a member of Los Chicos for a short period of time, he was the only singer to be a member of both Los Chicos and Menudo. Sergio Blass was also a member of arguably the third most popular boy band in Puerto Rico during the early eighties, Concepto Juvenil, making him the only person to be in all three bands. In 1990, Tony Ocasio joined the United States Army and was sent to Iraq where he fought at in Operation Desert Storm.

In the aftermath of the success achieved by six former Menudos in a comeback nicknamed El Reencuentro, some former members of Los Chicos spoke about making a comeback too. They had one concert, as 'Los Chicos-El Retorno". Chayanne did not participate in it.

In August 2012, three former members of Los Chicos released a tell all book named "Los Chicos ~ Mil Recuerdos Sus Historias" written by Joana Acevedo Ocasio with the help of Tony Ocasio (Original lead singer of Los Chicos) and original group members Rey Diaz and Migue Santa. The book recounts their experiences as members of the famous boy band, how they reached stardom and lost it all to mismanagement.

Former member Jose Miguel "Migue" Santa died of respiratory failure on March 19, 2019, at the age of 51.

== Members ==
- Chayanne (Elmer Figueroa Arce)
- Migue (Jose Miguel Santa, 1966-2019)
- Rey (Reynaldo Diaz)
- Tony (Hector Antonio Ocasio Cedeño, 1967-2025)
- Alex (Jose Alejandro Rodriguez)
- Tico (Fredrick Santana Contreras)
- Giro (Jorge Manuel Lopez Martinez)
- Caccito (Alejandro Farinacci Fontecha)

== Discography ==
- 1980 - Para Amar [Original Members: Chayanne, Rey Diaz, Migue Santa and Tony Ocasio]
- 1982 - Puerto Rico [Original Members]
- 1983 - Viva el Amor [Original Members]
- 1983 - Bailando [Original Members]
- 1984 - Los Chicos en Conexion Caribe [Tony, + Tico, Alex, and Alejandro]
- 1985 - Ases de Puerto Rico [Tico, Alex, Alejandro, + Jorge]
- 1985 - Los Chicos en Portugues [Same members as above]
- 1986 - Con Fuego y Pasion [Tico, Alejandro, Jorge, + Tony]

== See also ==
- Es mi Nombre - debut studio album by Chayanne
- Giro - member of the band
- H2O - another Puerto Rican boy band
- Conexion Caribe - 1984 film starring Los Chicos
