= List of Spanish Broadcasting System radio stations =

The radio stations operated by Spanish Broadcasting System and their programming formats are:

== Current ==
=== Orlando ===
- WPYO El Zol 95 (Spanish Tropical)

=== Tampa ===
- WSUN (FM) El Zol 97 (Spanish Tropical)

=== Los Angeles ===
- KLAX-FM 97.9 La Raza HD1 (Regional Mexican)/La Privada 97.9 HD2 (Regional Mexican Oldies)
- KXOL-FM La Mega 96.3 HD1 (pop)/El Zol 96.3 HD2 (Spanish Tropical)

=== Houston ===
- KROI La Ley 92.1 (Regional Mexican)

=== New York ===
- WSKQ-FM La Mega 97.9 HD1 (Spanish Tropical)
- WPAT-FM 93.1 Amor HD1 (Spanish Tropical)/La Privada 93.1 HD2 (Regional Mexican Urbano)

=== Puerto Rico ===
- WMEG La Mega 106.9 (CHR – Latin/American Top 40)
- WEGM La Mega 95.1 (CHR – Latin/American Top 40)
- WRXD Estereotempo 96.5 (Adult contemporary)
- WNVI Estereotempo 1040 (Adult contemporary) (owned by Aurio A. Matos Barreto)
- WZNT Zeta 93.7 (Salsa)
- WZMT Zeta 93.3 (Salsa)
- WIOB Zeta 97.5 (Salsa)
- WODA La Nueva 94.7 (Urban)
- WNOD La Nueva 94.1 (Urban)

=== Chicago ===
- WLEY-FM La Ley 107.9 (Regional Mexican)

=== Miami ===
- WXDJ El Zol 106.7 (Spanish Tropical)
- WCMQ-FM Zeta 92.3 (Salsa / Adult Contemporary)
- WRMA Ritmo 95.7 (Cubatón)
- WRAZ-FM Salsa 106.3 (Salsa) (owned by South Broadcasting System)
- WMFM El Zol 107.9 (Spanish Tropical) (owned by South Broadcasting System)

=== San Francisco ===
- KRZZ 93.3 La Raza (Regional Mexican)

== Former ==
=== Puerto Rico ===
- WIOA 99.9 FM (San Juan, now owned by International Broadcasting Corporation)
- WIOC 105.1 FM (Ponce, now owned by International Broadcasting Corporation)
- WZET 92.1 FM (Hormigueros, now owned by International Broadcasting Corporation)

=== Los Angeles ===
- KZAB 93.5 FM (Now owned by Meruelo Radio Holdings)
- KXMG 1540 AM (Now owned by P&Y Broadcasting Corporation)

=== New York ===
- WXLX 620 AM (Now owned by Davidson Radio, Inc)

=== San Francisco ===
- KBTB 92.7 FM (Now owned by Golden State Broadcasting, LLC)

=== Chicago ===
- WKIE 92.7 FM (Now owned by Newsweb Corporation)
- WKIF 92.7 FM (Now owned by Milner Media Partners, LLC)
- WDEK 92.5 FM (Now owned by Educational Media Foundation)
