= WNVI =

Radio station in Moca, Puerto Rico

WZNA
Simulcast of WRXD, Fajardo

Moca, Puerto Rico; Puerto Rico
- Frequency: 1040 kHz
- Branding: Estereotempo

Programming
- Format: Adult Contemporary

Ownership
- Owner: Aurio A. Matos Barreto
- Operator: Spanish Broadcasting System (under time brokerage agreement)
- Sister stations: Via Matos Barreto: WCMA, WJIT, WLUZ, WZCA, WWNA, WUTD-FM; Via SBS: WZNT/WZMT/WIOB, WODA/WNOD, WRXD, WMEG/WEGM, WTCV/WVOZ-TV/WVEO

History
- First air date: May 16, 1983; 42 years ago
- Former call signs: WCXQ (1982–1994); WZNA (1994–2016); WNVI (2016–2025)
- Call sign meaning: Zona

Technical information
- Licensing authority: FCC
- Facility ID: 17074
- Class: B
- ERP: 9,250 watts
- Transmitter coordinates: 18°16′38″N 67°10′51″W
- Translator: 94.5 W233CW (Mayagüez/Yauco)

Links
- Public license information: Public file; LMS
- Website: estereotempo.lamusica.com

WZNA (1040 AM), branded on-air as Estereotempo, is a radio station broadcasting an Adult Contemporary format. Licensed to Moca, Puerto Rico, United States, the station serves the western Puerto Rico area. The station is currently owned by Aurio A. Matos Barreto (President and General Manager of the station) and operated by Spanish Broadcasting System under a time brokerage agreement. WZNA is simulcasting on translator station W233CW 94.5 FM in Mayagüez/Yauco, Puerto Rico.

== History ==
The station went on the air as WCXQ on 1982-06-28. On 1994-07-27, the station changed its call sign to WZNA, later to WNVI on 2016-02-12, back to the current WZNA on 2025-03-26.

The translator W238CR operated for eight years on 104.5, moving to 95.5 on October 1, 2016.

== Translator stations ==
Broadcast translator for WZNA
Call sign	Frequency	City of license	FID	ERP (W)	FCC info
W233CW	94.5 FM	Mayagüez/Yauco, Puerto Rico	202066	.25	LMS
