= WCMA =

WCMA may refer to:

- WCMA (AM), a radio station (1600 AM) licensed to serve Bayamon, Puerto Rico
- WRXD, a radio station (96.5 FM) licensed to serve Fajardo, Puerto Rico formerly known as WCMA-FM
- WCMA (Alabama), a radio station (1560 AM) formerly licensed to serve Daleville, Alabama, United States
- Western Canadian Music Awards, an annual music awards festival to celebrate the music of Western Canada
- Williams College Museum of Art, an art museum at Williams College in Williamstown, Massachusetts, United States
