= WRMA (disambiguation) =

WRMA is a radio station (95.7 FM) licensed to North Miami Beach, Florida.

WRMA may also refer to:

- WXDJ, a radio station (106.7 FM) licensed to Fort Lauderdale, Florida, which held the call sign WRMA from 1994 to 2014
- WXZZ, a radio station (103.3 FM) licensed to Georgetown, Kentucky, which held the call sign WRMA from 1984 to 1986
- WZKD, a radio station (950 AM) licensed to Montgomery, Alabama, which held the call sign WRMA from 1953 to 1977
