= Sleepy Stein =

Alex N. "Sleepy" Stein (b January 15, 1919, in Savannah, Georgia, d. July 27, 2000, in Rancho Palos Verdes, California) was a jazz disc jockey and radio station owner. When he acquired KNOB in Signal Hill, California, he made it the world's first all-jazz radio station.

== Early life ==
Stein lived in Miami and Havana, graduating from the University of Havana. He worked in New York City for CBS radio in the 1940s, then as a disc jockey in Chicago, where he acquired his nickname after replacing a DJ whose nickname was "Wide-Awake", and in Phoenix, Arizona, where he was station manager and program manager at KARV.

== Career ==
Moving to Southern California, Stein became a disc jockey at KFOX, often broadcasting from the Lighthouse Café in Hermosa Beach. In 1957, he bought KNOB, where he instituted an all-jazz programming policy. The station became known as "The Jazz Knob". His staff included such announcers as Chuck Niles and Jim Gosa. In the early '60s, Stein hosted a radio show on KNOB from Strollers, a nightclub in Long Beach, with live performances by such players as Chico Hamilton.

After selling KNOB in 1966, Stein worked as a stockbroker. The Los Angeles Jazz Institute has a collection which "features large scrapbooks that document his career including detailed coverage of the birth and growth of KNOB. The collection also includes photographs and reel to reel tapes featuring airchecks and on-air interviews."

External image
- http://www.gallery41.com/JazzArtists/SleepySteinWillThornburyTeddyEdwards.htm Left to right, Sleepy Stein, Will Thornbury, Teddy Edwards. Source: Gallery 41.
