= Lucille's Smokehouse Bar-B-Que =

Restaurant chain in the western United States

Coordinates: 33.8044°N 118.1606°W

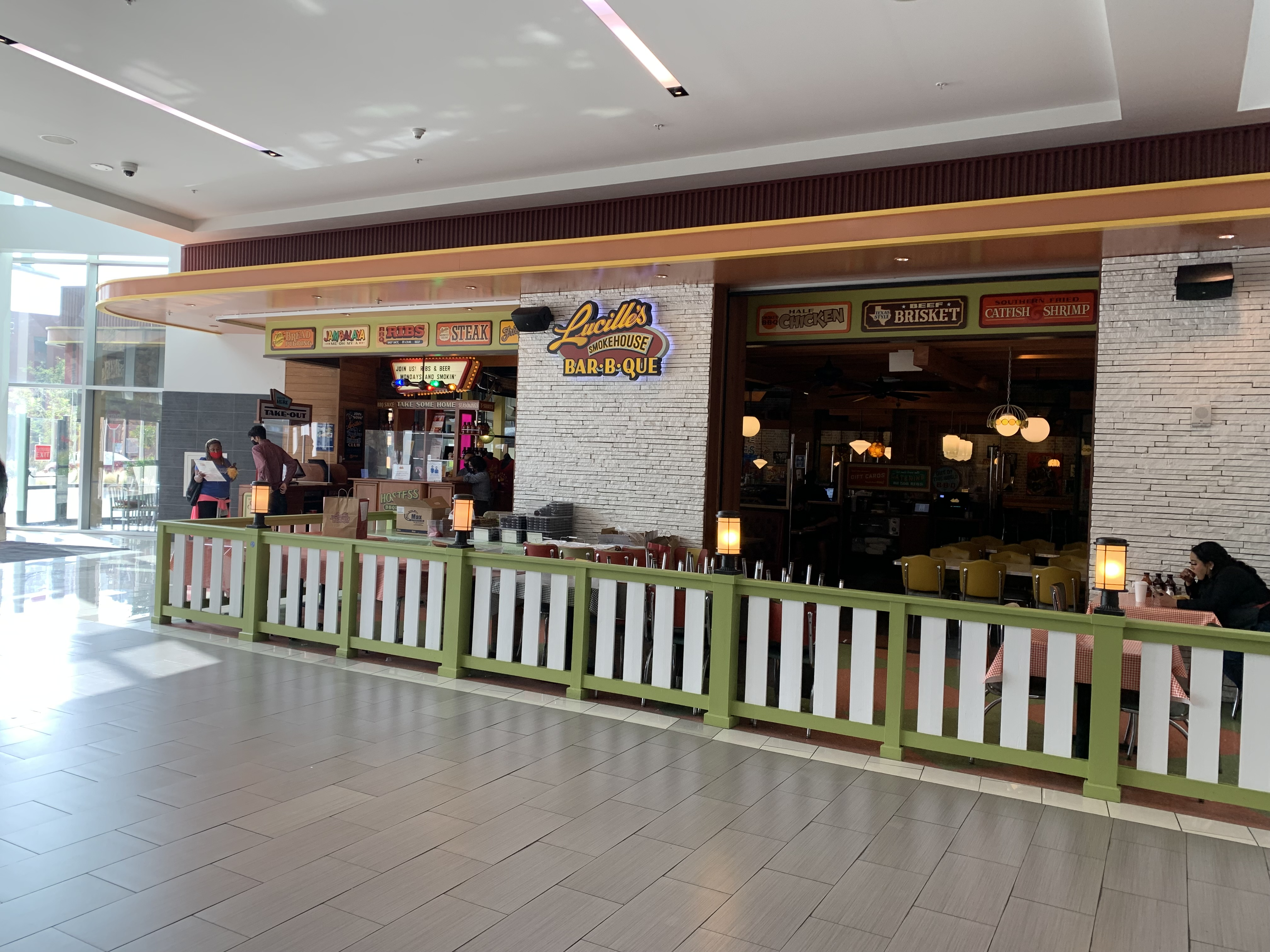
- A Lucille's Smokehouse Bar-B-Que in the Westfield Culver City Mall in Culver City, California, United States.
- Type: Subsidiary
- Industry: Restaurant
- Founded: 1999
- Headquarters: Long Beach, California
- Number of locations: 19
- Area served: California, Arizona, Nevada
- Key people: Craig Hofman (Founder)
- Parent: Hof's Hut
- Website: Official website

Lucille's Smokehouse Bar-B-Que is a chain of restaurants founded in Signal Hill, California specializing in barbecue cuisine as well as southern and Cajun style meals. The restaurants feature a southern American and Blues theme. The chain has locations in California, Arizona, and Nevada, and is owned by Hofman Hospitality Group.

== See also ==
- Hof's Hut
- List of barbecue restaurants
- List of Cajun restaurants
- List of Southern restaurants
