= WSBS-TV =

Television station in Key West, Florida

- Key West, Florida; United States
- Channels: Digital: 3 (VHF); Virtual: 22
- Branding: Mega TV; Mega News

Programming
- Affiliations: 22.1: Mega TV; 22.2: Visión Latina

Ownership
- Owner: Spanish Broadcasting System; (WSBS Licensing, Inc.)
- Sister stations: WRMA; WCMQ-FM; WXDJ; WMFM; WRAZ-FM

History
- Founded: October 2, 1989
- First air date: June 1993
- Former call signs: WYDH (October 2–11, 1989); WEYS (October 11, 1989–April 2003); WGEN-TV (April–September 2003); WDLP-TV (November 2003–July 2004, September 2004–2006); WSBS-TV (July–September 2004)
- Former channel number: Analog: 22 (UHF, 1993–2009)
- Former affiliations: Independent (1989–1994); Telemundo Internacional (1994–1996); CBS Telenoticias (1996–2000); Network One (2000–2006)
- Call sign meaning: Spanish Broadcasting System

Technical information
- Licensing authority: FCC
- Facility ID: 72053
- ERP: 1 kW
- HAAT: 54 m (177 ft)
- Transmitter coordinates: 24°33′19.8″N 81°48′4.5″W
- Translator(s): WSBS-CD 19 (UHF) Miami

Links
- Public license information: Public file; LMS
- Website: mega.tv

WSBS-TV (channel 22) is a television station licensed to Key West, Florida, United States, serving as the flagship station of the Spanish-language network Mega TV. Owned by Spanish Broadcasting System, the station maintains studios on Northwest 77th Avenue in Miami, and its transmitter is located on Bahama and Simonton Streets in Key West.

WSBS-TV's over-the-air broadcasting radius only covers the western Florida Keys. Therefore, it is relayed in the immediate Miami area through low-power, Class A translator WSBS-CD (channel 19), and also relies on cable and satellite carriage to reach the entire South Florida market.

== History ==
The station was originally licensed as WYDH on October 2, 1989; the calls were changed to WEYS on October 11, 1989, and the station itself first signed on the air in June 1993. WSBS-TV has had numerous callsign changes over the years. This has caused much confusion, both among viewers and writers. In many places, the station is still referred to as WEYS TeleNoticias, and WDLP Licensing, Inc. remained the licensee for several months after the call change to WSBS-TV. Some of these calls have been reused by low-power repeater stations, themselves often subject to similar callsign shuffles (for instance, the WDLP callsign is currently used by a repeater for rival WGEN-TV). On April 4, 2003, the station changed its call letters to WGEN-TV; it was then changed to WDLP-TV on September 24 of that year. The current WSBS-TV call letters were first adopted on July 1, 2004, before reverting to the WDLP-TV callsign on September 28, 2004. Prior to 2005, the station was co-owned with another Key West station, WGEN-TV, under the ownership of Sonia Broadcasting.

On March 1, 2006, the station became a charter station of Mega TV when the network was launched, and changed its callsign back to the previous WSBS-TV letters. Its original slate of programming includes productions aimed at young Hispanic viewers. Mega TV's format follows a very similar pattern traced by rival Telemundo station WSCV (channel 51) and Univision station WLTV (channel 23) decades earlier: by creating its own television personalities.

== Technical information ==
=== Subchannels ===
The station's signal is multiplexed:

Subchannels of WSBS-TV
Subchannel	Res.	Short name	Programming
22.1	1080i	WSBS	Mega TV
22.2	720p	VISLATN	Visión Latina (Spanish religious)
22.3	720p	Test	Simulcast of 22.1

=== Analog-to-digital conversion ===
WSBS-TV ended programming on its analog signal, on UHF channel 22, on June 12, 2009, the official date on which full-power television stations in the United States transitioned from analog to digital broadcasts under federal mandate. The station's digital signal continued to broadcast on its pre-transition VHF channel 3, using virtual channel 22. WSBS is one of the only television stations in the United States to operate its digital signal on the VHF low band, which is especially rare on channels 2 to 4 (54–72 MHz), due to interference that the band is subjected to. It chose to keep this channel in the first round of the digital channel elections.

== Translator ==
City of license	Callsign	Channel	ERP	HAAT	Facility ID	Transmitter coordinates
Miami	WSBS-CD	19	15 kW	285.6 m (937.0 ft)	29547	25°59′10″N 80°11′36.3″W

WSBS-CA (analog UHF channel 50), which lists "Miami, etc." as its city of license, flash cut its signal to digital in early 2010, and accordingly changed its callsign to WSBS-CD. This station has a Class A broadcast license, meaning that although it is low-power, it has protection from RF interference as full-power stations do. Like the main station, it uses virtual channel 22.1, as it is likely just an RF passthrough with no demodulation. Its transmitter is located in the Andover section of Miami Gardens, immediately south of the tower facility that is used by several other Miami area television stations, and has a directional antenna that aims mostly southeast and southwest, covering far northeastern Miami-Dade County, the city of Miami and far southeastern Broward County, up to just south of Fort Lauderdale.
