= WZNA =

WZNA may refer to:

- WZNA-LD, a low-power television station (channel 3) licensed to serve Guaynabo, Puerto Rico
- WNVI, a radio station (1040 AM) licensed to serve Moca, Puerto Rico, which held the call sign WZNA from 1994 to 2016
