= WRAZ =

WRAZ may refer to:

- WRAZ (TV), a television station (channel 15, virtual 50) licensed to Raleigh, North Carolina, United States
- WRAZ-FM, a radio station (106.3 FM) licensed to Key Largo, Florida, United States
