= KLAX-FM =

Regional Mexican radio station in Los Angeles

Coordinates: 34.164°N 118.196°W

- East Los Angeles, California; United States
- Broadcast area: Greater Los Angeles
- Frequency: 97.9 MHz (HD Radio)
- Branding: 97.9 La Raza

Programming
- Language: Spanish
- Format: Regional Mexican
- Subchannels: HD2: Regional Mexican "La Privada"

Ownership
- Owner: Spanish Broadcasting System; (KLAX Licensing, Inc.)
- Sister stations: KXOL-FM

History
- First air date: April 22, 1949
- Former call signs: KNOB (1949–1988); KSKQ-FM (1988–1992)
- Call sign meaning: LAX, Los Angeles's IATA airport code, or "La X" (name in the mid-1990s)

Technical information
- Licensing authority: FCC
- Facility ID: 61638
- Class: B
- ERP: 33,000 watts
- HAAT: 184 meters (604 ft)

Links
- Public license information: Public file; LMS
- Webcast: Listen live
- Website: www.lamusica.com/en/stations/klax/

KLAX-FM (97.9 FM) is an American commercial radio station located in East Los Angeles, California, broadcasting to the Greater Los Angeles area. It is owned by Spanish Broadcasting System (SBS). KLAX-FM airs a regional Mexican music format branded as "La Raza". The station has studios in Los Angeles, and its transmitter is based in Glendale.

== History ==
=== KNOB ===
The station began broadcasting on April 22, 1949, holding the call sign KNOB. It originally broadcast at 103.1 MHz and was licensed to Long Beach, California.

On August 18, 1957, the station switched to an all jazz music format, becoming the world's first all-jazz station. It was branded "The Jazz Knob". Its owner was Sleepy Stein, who was able to get permission from the Federal Communications Commission for a power increase by switching the frequency to 97.9 in 1958. It broadcast from a studio at their transmitter site atop Signal Hill, near Long Beach Airport. The building and tower remain to this day, though the station has moved away to Flint Peak near Glendale. The station's original high-power transmitter was a Western Electric 10 kW that had previously been installed at KNX-FM.

In 1966, the station was sold to Jeanette Pennino Banoczi and husband Jack Banoczi, owners of the Pennino Music Company, for $262,850. KNOB's studios were moved to Anaheim, California. Later that year, the station switched to an all-request middle of the road (MOR) format, with ethnic programming on Sundays.

KNOB would later air a beautiful music format. In the early 1980s, the station began airing a syndicated MOR format. In September 1985, it adopted a soft adult contemporary "love songs" format branded "For Lovers Only".

=== KSKQ-FM ===
In 1988, KNOB was sold to Spanish Broadcasting System for $15 million and its call sign was changed to KSKQ-FM. The station aired a Spanish-language adult contemporary format.

=== KLAX-FM ===
In 1992, under the direction of general manager Alfredo Rodriguez, KSKQ-FM was turned into a Banda music station, KLAX-FM, branded "La Equis". In January 1993, KLAX-FM became the most-listened-to station in the market, the first Spanish-language station in Los Angeles to achieve this.

In 1998, KLAX-FM moved its city of license from Long Beach to East Los Angeles. In 2002, KLAX dropped the contemporary hits and went to a more focused regional format as "La Raza 97.9". In March 2017, KLAX began carrying the morning show hosted by Terry "El Terrible" Cortez, Kristel "La Kristy" Yañez, and Johnny "El Perro" Orta, of WLEY-FM, "La Ley 107.9" in Chicago. The program also airs on KRZZ in San Francisco. As of August 3, 2026 started airing outside of California in Nocatee Florida on WZSP. Before joining KRZZ in 2014, Cortez and Yañez had been part of Eddie "Piolín" Sotelo's syndicated morning show for 12 years.

==== Immigration debate ====
Renán "El Cucuy" Almendárez Coello, the station's morning show host, helped coordinate a demonstration held on the streets of downtown Los Angeles on March 25, 2006. The event drew an estimated 500,000 participants and was a springboard to further similar events held throughout the United States. The protesters marched in opposition to H.R. 4437, a proposal Congressional law that would theoretically make illegal immigration to the U.S. more difficult. Coello received attention in various media following the original protests, including an appearance on Tom Leykis' English-language radio talk show.
