= KRZZ =

Regional Mexican radio station in San Francisco

Coordinates: 37.687°N 122.435°W

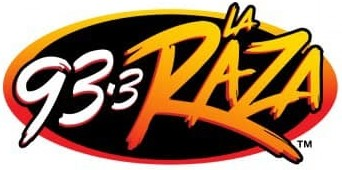
- San Francisco, California; United States
- Broadcast area: San Francisco Bay Area
- Frequency: 93.3 MHz (HD Radio)
- Branding: 93.3 La Raza

Programming
- Language: Spanish
- Format: Regional Mexican
- Subchannels: HD2: Regional Mexican "La Privada"
- Affiliations: LaMusica

Ownership
- Owner: Spanish Broadcasting System; (KRZZ Licensing, LLC)

History
- First air date: January 1959
- Former call signs: KYA-FM (1959–1965, 1972-1980, 1982–1994); KOIT (1965-1972); KLHT (1980–1982); KYCY (1994–1997); KYCY-FM (1997–2002); KKWV (2002–2003); KBAY (2003–2004); KBAA (September–November 2004)
- Call sign meaning: Raza

Technical information
- Licensing authority: FCC
- Facility ID: 1092
- Class: B
- ERP: 6,000 watts
- HAAT: 415 meters (1,362 ft)

Links
- Public license information: Public file; LMS
- Webcast: Listen live
- Website: lamusica.com/stations/krzz

KRZZ (93.3 FM) is a commercial radio station licensed to San Francisco, California, United States, broadcasting to the San Francisco Bay Area. KRZZ airs a regional Mexican format branded as "93.3 La Raza". The station's studios are located in San Jose just north of downtown, and the transmitter is located in the San Bruno Mountains.

== History ==
KRZZ has adopted many programming formats since sign on in 1959, as KYA-FM. The station carried a Top 40 format for many years, either in conjunction with, or separate from KYA. In December 1979, both stations flipped to an easy album rock format titled "Easy Rock 93 FM". Within months, the FM station became KLHT ("K-Lite"), while KYA flipped to an oldies format. Two years later, the FM would regain its original call letters while flipping to an oldies format that lasted a decade.

On March 28, 1994, KYA flipped to high-energy country music as "Young Country 93.3" and later changed its call sign to KYCY. The station would add the -FM suffix in 1997, when the station began simulcasting on 1550 AM, and would later rebrand as "Y93" on February 22, 1999. On December 18, 2001, KYCY began stunting with Christmas music for a week, followed by simulcasts of other sister Infinity Broadcasting stations in San Francisco, and then a three-day loop of the song "It's a Small World". On December 31, the station flipped to a hybrid rhythmic AC/world music format as KKWV, "93.3 The Wave". On September 2, 2003, at 6 am, the station joined in a simulcast with KBAY as "93.3 and 94.5 K-Bay". In November 2004, the station broke from the simulcast and flipped to regional Mexican. The next year, the station was sold by Infinity Broadcasting to Spanish Broadcasting System.

In March 2017, KRZZ began airing the morning program hosted by Terry "El Terrible" Cortez, Kristel Yañez and Johnny Orta at WLEY-FM in Chicago. The program is also heard on KLAX-FM in Los Angeles and as of August 3, 2026, on WZSP in Nocatee, Florida.
