= Alamitos oil well =

California Historic Landmark

Alamitos #1
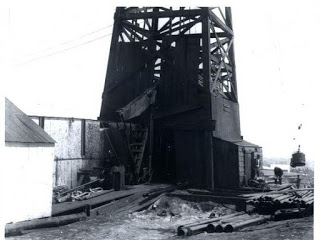
- Alamitos oil well #1 1921

- Location within the Los Angeles metropolitan area
- 33°47′50″N 118°09′32″W
- Location: Signal Hill, California

History
- Built: 1921

California Historical Landmark
- Designated: May 1, 1957
- Reference no.: 580

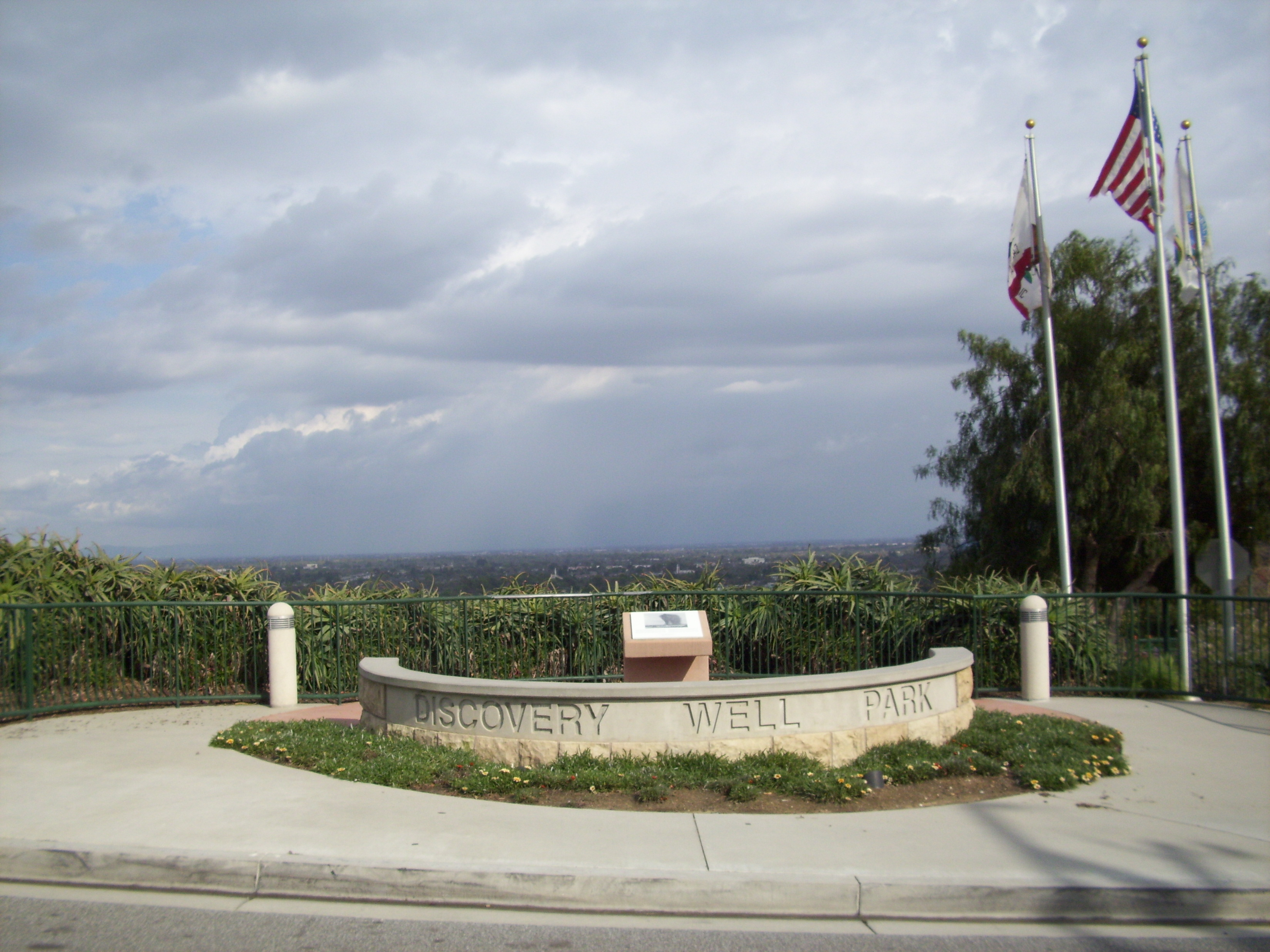
Signal Hill marker of Alamitos oil well #1

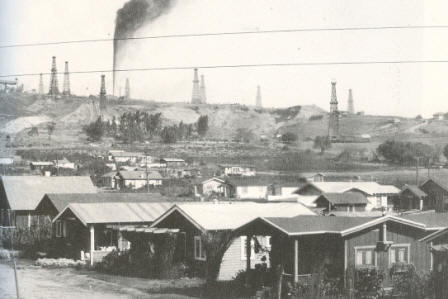
Oil wells on Signal Hill in 1921

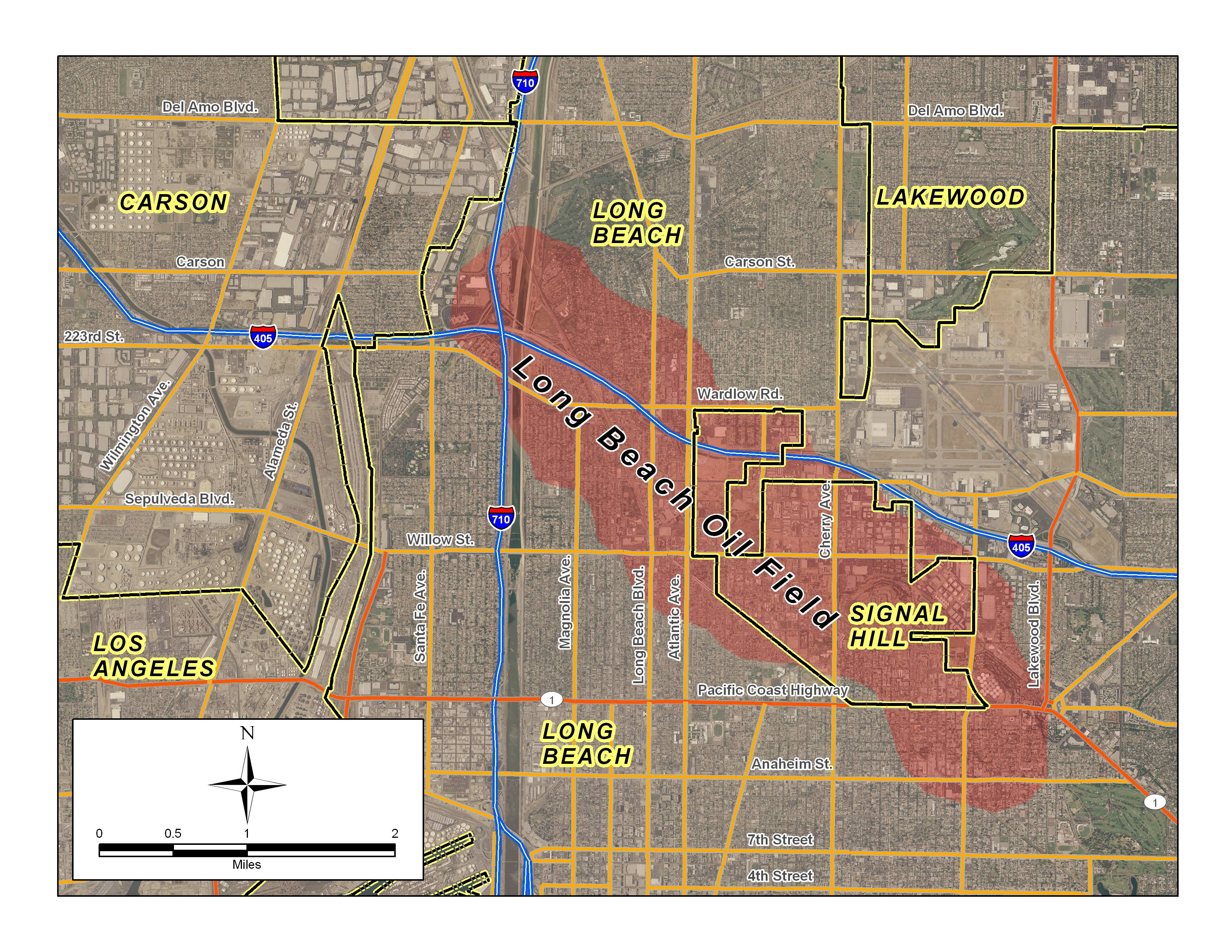
Map of the Long Beach field, showing the site of Signal Hill and Alamitos oil well #1

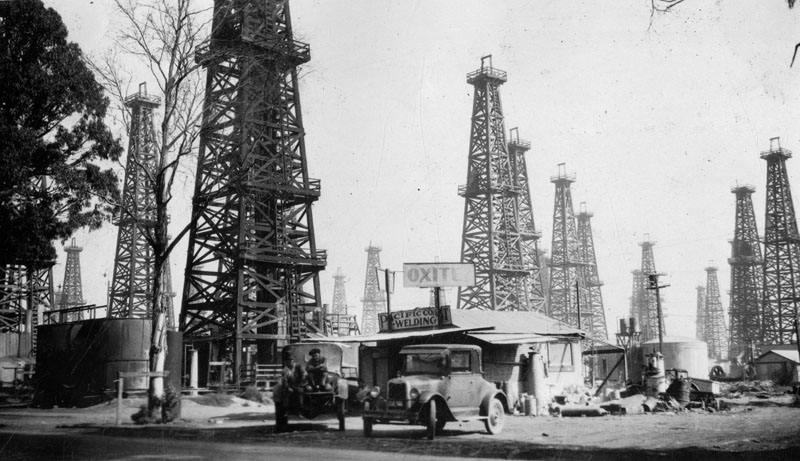
Signal Hill oil field in 1926

The Alamitos oil well #1 or Alamitos #1 is the site of a famous oil well in Signal Hill, California, the start of the Long Beach oilfield. The spot is also known as Porcupine Hill. The Alamitos well #1 was designated a California Historic Landmark (No. 580) on May 1, 1957. The Signal Hill oil discovered in 1921 became the black gold of Southern California. Alamitos #1 started drilling on March 23, 1921. The leader of the drilling was O.P. "Happy" Yowells. On June 23 at 9:30 a.m. the drill, at about 2,765 feet down, hit oil that was trapped underground. The trapped oil was pressurized by natural gas. The pressure pushed the blowout oil 114 feet into the air, when the drill hit the oil. The drilling rig collapsed in the blowout. A new clean well was drilled nearby and started production on June 25, 1921. Alamitos oil well #1 put out 600 barrels a day and 700,000 barrels before running out.

In 1917, Union Oil Company had drilled near the area of Signal Hill and found no oil. Royal Dutch Shell Oil Company drilled Alamitos Well #1 and found the gusher. Alamitos Well #1 found one of the richest oil fields in the world. The Long Beach oilfield produced over 1 billion barrels of oil by 1984. The Long Beach oilfield is still in use and producing oil. In 2002 the oilfield pumped out 1.5 million barrels of oil.

== Marker ==
A California Historic Landmark marker is at the northeast corner of Temple Avenue and Hill Street in Signal Hill. The marker on the site reads:

NO. 580 WELL, ALAMITOS 1 – One of the world's most famous wells. Started on March 23, 1921, it flowed 590 barrels of oil a day when it was completed June 25, 1921, at a depth of 3,114 feet. This discovery well led to the development of one of the most productive oil fields in the world and helped to establish California as a major oil producing state.

== See also ==
- California Historical Landmarks in Los Angeles County
