= Hof's Hut =

American restaurant chain

Coordinates: 33.8049°N 118.1606°W

Hof's Hut Restaurant and Bakery
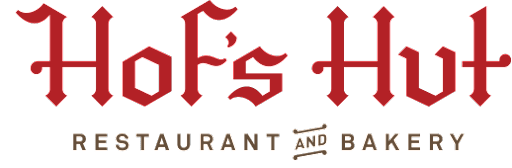
- Company type: Private
- Founded: 1951; 75 years ago
- Founder: Harold Hofman
- Headquarters: Signal Hill, California
- Number of locations: 6
- Area served: Long Beach, California; Seal Beach, California; Torrance, California
- Key people: Chistopher Crawley (CEO)
- Website: www.hofshut.com

Hof's Hut is a home-style eatery and 1950s coffee shop-style regional restaurant chain in the Los Angeles Area that specializes in comfort foods and baked goods such as pies. It is considered a cultural landmark and was founded by Harold Hofman in 1951. The company is headquartered in Signal Hill, and operates locations in Long Beach, Seal Beach, and Torrance.

== History ==
Hofman started out with a burger stand on the beach in the 1940s at 5th Place in Long Beach serving "Hofburgers" for 15 cents. The first Hof's Hut opened on September 16, 1951, in Belmont Shore by Harold Hofman, the same day his son and current owner Craig Hofman was born. In 1975 the chain opened its 9th restaurant, and in 1993 the chain introduced vegetarian burgers.

In 1993, Hof's Hut opposed a statewide smoking ban applied to cocktail sections which serve food. The ban was ultimately passed.

On January 18, 2015, two fires destroyed the Bixby Knolls location reducing the number of open locations from four to three.

George Kosanovich tended bar at the Hof's Hut in Bixby Knolls for 40 years and while there witnessed president John F. Kennedy getting gunned down in Dallas in 1963 on the television and watched the "fuzzy images" of the first lunar landing.

== Lucille's Smokehouse ==
Facing competitive pressures, Hofman started the Lucille's Smokehouse BBQ chain that has taken over some Hof's Hut locations. Competition from Starbucks, newer casual eatery chains with more exciting atmospheres, and breakfast nooks pressured Hof's Hut at the start of the 21st century. After various experiments modifying the format at some locations, owner Craig Hofman hit on the Lucille's Smokehouse concept and has been establishing that chain while reducing the number of Hof's Hut locations from a peak of 18. Lucille's Smokehouse replaced the original Hof's Hutt Belmont Shore location in 2003. This location has since been replaced by a specialty concept called Saint and Second owned by the Hofman family.
