= WJIT =

Simulcast of WEGA, Vega Baja

Sabana, Puerto Rico; Puerto Rico
- Frequency: 1250 kHz
- Branding: Candelita7

Programming
- Format: Religious

Ownership
- Owner: Aurio A. Matos Barreto
- Operator: Ministerio en Pie de Guerra, Inc.
- Sister stations: WCMA, WNVI, WWNA, WLUZ, WUTD-FM

History
- First air date: March 31, 2000; 25 years ago

Technical information
- Licensing authority: FCC
- Facility ID: 50276
- Class: B
- Power: 1,250 watts
- Transmitter coordinates: 18°25′37″N 66°20′20″W
- Translator: 101.3 W267DD (Vega Baja)

Links
- Public license information: Public file; LMS
- Website: candelita7.com

WJIT (1250 AM) is a radio station broadcasting a Religious format. It is licensed to Sabana, Puerto Rico, and is owned by Aurio A. Matos Barreto and operated under a time brokerage agreement by Ministerio En Pie de Guerra, Inc. The station shares with translator station W267DD (101.3 FM) in Vega Baja.

== Translator stations ==
Broadcast translator for WJIT
Call sign	Frequency	City of license	FID	ERP (W)	FCC info
W267DD	101.3 FM	Vega Baja, Puerto Rico	202070	250	LMS
