= WWNA =

Aguadilla, Puerto Rico; Puerto Rico
- Frequency: 1340 kHz
- Branding: Una 96.5 FM & 1340 AM

Programming
- Format: Spanish Variety

Ownership
- Owner: Dominga Barreto Santiago; (DBS Radio, Inc.)
- Sister stations: WCMA, WJIT, WLUZ, WZCA, WUTD-FM

History
- First air date: September 6, 1956
- Former call signs: WGRF (1956-1964); WUNA (1964-1988); WNOZ (1988-1999)

Technical information
- Licensing authority: FCC
- Facility ID: 49815
- Class: B
- Power: 950 watts
- Transmitter coordinates: 18°24′0″N 67°09′48″W
- Translator: 96.5 W243ET (Aguadilla-Mayaguez)

Links
- Public license information: Public file; LMS

WWNA (1340 AM, "Una 96.5 FM & 1340 AM") is a radio station licensed to serve Aguadilla, Puerto Rico. The station is owned by Dominga Barreto Santiago, through licensee DBS Radio, Inc. It airs a Spanish Variety format.

The station was assigned the WWNA call letters by the Federal Communications Commission on September 24, 1999.

== Ownership ==
In August 2004, Dominga Barreto Santiago reached an agreement to purchase WWNA from Aureo Matos for a reported sale price of $500,000. At the time of the sale, the station aired a Spanish-language Beautiful Music and Talk radio format. Barreto Santiago transferred WWNA's broadcast license to her wholly owned company DBS Radio, Inc. effective September 19, 2014.

== Translator stations ==
Broadcast translator for WWNA
Call sign	Frequency	City of license	FID	ERP (W)	FCC info
W243ET	96.5 FM	Aguadilla-Mayaguez, Puerto Rico	202076	.25	LMS

== Logos ==
Former WWNA logo.
