= WCMA (AM) =

Puerto Rican radio station

Bayamón, Puerto Rico; Puerto Rico
- Broadcast area: Puerto Rico
- Frequency: 1600 kHz
- Branding: Cima 103.7

Programming
- Format: Spanish Tropical

Ownership
- Owner: Aurio A. Matos Barreto
- Sister stations: WNVI, WJIT, WLUZ, WZCA, WWNA, WUTD-FM

History
- First air date: August 1966; 59 years ago
- Former call signs: WLUZ (1966–2012)
- Call sign meaning: CiMA

Technical information
- Licensing authority: FCC
- Facility ID: 39145
- Class: B
- Power: 5,000 watts
- Transmitter coordinates: 18°21′38″N 66°59′30″W
- Translators: 96.1 W241DE (Bayamón); 103.7 W279BU (San Juan)
- Repeater: 91.7 WZCA (Quebradillas)

Links
- Public license information: Public file; LMS
- Webcast: Listen Live
- Website: cimafm.com

WCMA (1600 kHz, is an AM radio station broadcasting a evangélico format. Licensed to Bayamón, Puerto Rico, it serves all of Puerto Rico. The station is currently owned by Aurio A. Matos Barreto. WCMA shares with translator stations W279BU (103.7 FM) in San Juan and W241DE (96.1 FM), also licensed to Bayamón. WCMA simulcasts on WZCA (91.7 FM) in Quebradillas. The station was originally known as WLUZ, founded by Puerto Rican producer Tommy Muñiz after the original owner's wife, Luz María García de la Noceda.

== History ==
=== NotiLuz ===
In 1966, Muñiz planned to create a radio station, Noti-Luz which was set to debut in March of that year, after Lucy Boscana introduced him to the owner of the 1600 AM frequency.

=== Cima Radio Network ===
WCMA is the flagship station of the Cima Radio Network. WCMA's programming is also heard on translator stations 96.1 FM in Bayamón and 103.7 FM in San Juan.

== Translator stations ==
Broadcast translators for WCMA
Call sign	Frequency	City of license	FID	ERP (W)	FCC info
W279BU	103.7 FM	San Juan, Puerto Rico	143465	250 vertical	LMS
W241DE	96.1 FM	Bayamón, Puerto Rico	202074	190 vertical	LMS
