= WXDJ =

Spanish-language contemporary hit radio station in Miami

- Fort Lauderdale, Florida; United States
- Broadcast area: Miami–Fort Lauderdale–South Florida
- Frequency: 106.7 MHz (HD Radio)
- Branding: El Nuevo Zol 106.7

Programming
- Language: Spanish
- Format: Contemporary hit radio

Ownership
- Owner: Spanish Broadcasting System; (WRMA Licensing, Inc.)
- Sister stations: WRMA; WCMQ-FM; WRAZ-FM; WMFM; WSBS-TV

History
- First air date: August 15, 1962
- Former call signs: WFTL-FM (1962–1974); WGLO (1974–1979); WSDO-FM (1979–1982); WWJF (1982–1984); WJQY (1984–1993); WTPX (1993–1994); WRMA (1994–2014)

Technical information
- Licensing authority: FCC
- Facility ID: 66376
- Class: C1
- ERP: 98,000 watts
- HAAT: 302 meters (991 ft)
- Transmitter coordinates: 25°59′34″N 80°10′27″W

Links
- Public license information: Public file; LMS
- Webcast: Listen live
- Website: www.lamusica.com/stations/wxdj

WXDJ (106.7 FM, "El Nuevo Zol 106.7") is a commercial radio station licensed to Fort Lauderdale, Florida, and serving the Miami-Fort Lauderdale-South Florida radio market with secondary coverage of the West Palm Beach-Boca Raton market. The station airs a Spanish-language contemporary hit radio format and is owned by WRMA Licensing, Inc., a division of the Spanish Broadcasting System.

WXDJ's studios and offices are located at the Raul Alarcon Broadcast Center on Northwest 77th Avenue in Medley. It has an effective radiated power (ERP) of 98,000 watts. The transmitter is located on Fifth Street in Pembroke Park in southern Broward County. The station broadcasts using HD Radio technology.

== History ==
=== Early years ===
WXDJ signed on the air on August 15, 1962, as WFTL-FM. It was owned by the WFTL Broadcasting Company and was the sister station to WFTL (1400 AM, now WFLL). In 1974, as a beautiful music outlet, it changed its call sign to WGLO.

In 1979, the station switched to contemporary hit radio as WSDO-FM "Studio 107". In 1982, the station rebranded again, playing easy listening and middle of the road music as WWJF "Joy 107". On December 10, 1984, the station changed call letters for a fourth time as WJQY. WJQY achieved high ratings with a soft adult contemporary format. The station's programming came from the Transtar Radio Networks's satellite-fed "Format 41" service.

=== Move to hot AC ===
By the early 1990s, WJQY was lagging behind its competitors in the ratings. In order to improve the situation, in July 1993, station owner Tak Communications rebranded the station as "Tropics 106.7", changed WJQY's call letters to WTPX, and shifted to a hot adult contemporary format. WTPX only lasted nine months, as the format failed to improve the station's ratings woes. In addition, Tak filed for bankruptcy in the early 1990s, with EZ Communications acquiring two of the three Tak radio stations, WTPX and Philadelphia's WUSL, in October 1993.

However, EZ did not own WTPX for very long, as the company decided to leave the Miami market shortly after its acquisition. EZ also owned urban adult contemporary-formatted WHQT, which was swapped to Cox Radio in exchange for WSOC-FM in Charlotte. However, EZ could not sell WTPX to Cox; the Federal Communications Commission's ownership rules at the time prohibited one company from owning more than two FM's in one market, and Cox already owned WFLC. Instead, EZ sold WTPX to the Spanish Broadcasting System (SBS), with the sale being completed in August 1994.

=== Switch to Spanish programming ===
On August 25, 1994, at 12:10 am, after playing Donna Summer's "Last Dance", and a short good bye from South Florida radio veteran George Sheldon discussing the history of the 106.7 FM frequency, the station changed to a Spanish soft adult contemporary format, branded as WRMA "Romantica 106.7". The first song was Jon Secada's Spanish version of "Just Another Day". "Romantica 106.7" began enjoying a ratings boost, prompting another station, one dial position away, to switch to a similar Spanish ballad format, becoming WAMR-FM. The two stations competed for the Spanish-speaking adult audience into the early 2000s, with both stations usually in the top 10.

In the new millennium, WRMA dropped its focus on Latin ballads and began playing new music, often from unfamiliar artists. Then in 2010, the station moved to a 1990s/2000s Spanish hits format, with few new songs. However, the move did not click with listeners as WRMA started to see a decline in the ratings, leading to rumors of a possible format flip.

=== Bilingual dance and rhythm ===
In May 2012, SBS began registering new domains for WRMA, followed by the signing of former WPOW morning host DJ Laz to do mornings at sister station KXOL-FM in Los Angeles. On June 25, 2012, at midnight, WRMA dropped its Spanish contemporary format to become "DJ106.7", a bilingual dance/rhythmic contemporary format, featuring English-language rhythmic pop and dance hits mixed in with Latin rhythmic currents and utilizing bilingual DJs. The flip coincided with the station bringing back DJ Laz (the inspiration for the station's moniker) to the Miami airwaves on July 4, 2012, when his non-compete clause with WPOW expired, even though he was doing the show from KXOL (but would not be voice tracked, as he did it live for Miami listeners).

Upon the day of the station's debut of DJ Laz's show, the station added more air staffers and mixers to the lineup, most of them alumni from other stations. The station called itself "Miami's New #1 Party Station", using the same fonts and slogan as KXOL. Competition included Top 40/CHR WHYI-FM, R&B/hip-hop WEDR, and WPOW, which also used the slogan "Miami's Party Station". By August 2013, WRMA began to move further away from a bilingual approach and Hispanic rhythmic sound to a more conventional rhythmic Top 40 presentation. That resulted in Nielsen BDS placing the station on its rhythmic reporting panel, giving WPOW its first serious competition since WPYM left the air in February 2005.

=== Format and frequency swap ===
On November 28, 2013, at midnight, WRMA, citing low ratings and the surprise departure of DJ Laz, dropped its dance/rhythmic Top 40 format and began simulcasting the tropical programming heard on co-owned WXDJ (95.7 FM) as part of a format and call letter swap between the two stations. The last song played on "DJ 106.7" was "Take Over Control" by Afrojack. The simulcast ended on January 6, 2014, when the Tropical format moved to 106.7 FM permanently, and the new WRMA at 95.7 FM flipped to Spanish hot AC. The new WXDJ began using the moniker "El Nuevo Zol 106.7". The move gave the Spanish contemporary format more coverage into Broward County than it had at 95.7 FM.
