= WCMA (Alabama) =

DWCMA
Daleville, Alabama; United States
- Broadcast area: Dothan, Alabama
- Frequency: 1560 kHz

Programming
- Format: Defunct

Ownership
- Owner: Perihelion Global, Inc.
- Sister stations: WTKN

History
- First air date: 1982
- Former call signs: WRDJ (1982–1992); WTKN (1992–2005); WCMA (2005–2011)

Technical information
- Facility ID: 48759
- Class: D
- Power: 50,000 watts (day); 2,500 watts (critical hours)
- Transmitter coordinates: 31°16′35″N 85°45′54″W

Links
- Website: wcma1560.com

WCMA (1560 AM) was an American radio station licensed to serve the community of Daleville, Alabama. The station, established in 1982 as WRDJ, was last owned by Perihelion Global, Inc. The FCC deleted the broadcast license of WCMA on January 6, 2011, as the station had previously been silent since mid-July 2009.

== Programming ==
Before failing silent for the final time, the station broadcast a religious radio format that included a mix of praise, worship, and Southern Gospel music. Identifying itself as the "World Cultural Ministry Alliance", the station was managed by T.O.P.S.—The Ordinary People Society—under a local marketing agreement. T.O.P.S. is a not for profit, faith-based organization run by the Rev. Kenneth Glasgow.

== History ==
=== The beginning ===
This station received its original construction permit from the Federal Communications Commission on May 25, 1982, for a new AM station in Samson, Alabama, broadcasting at 1490 kHz. The new station was assigned the call letters WRDJ by the FCC on July 12, 1982. WRDJ received its license to cover from the FCC on August 25, 1982.

=== WRDJ era ===
On October 19, 1983, the station was granted a construction permit to change community of license to Daleville, Alabama, change frequency to 1350 kHz, and reduce operating hours to daytime only. WRDJ received a license to cover these changes on November 30, 1983.

WRDJ received a new construction permit on September 10, 1986, to increase signal power to 5,000 watts and move up to 1560 kHz. The station was granted a license to cover this change on June 13, 1989.

In March 1987, station owner Carol Stanley contracted to sell this station to WRDJ Christian Radio Cornerstone Ministries, Inc. The deal was approved by the FCC on May 14, 1987, but the transaction was never consummated and the Carol Stanley retained the broadcast license. Carol Stanley reached a new agreement in March 1988 to sell WRDJ, this time to Ed Carroll, Inc. The deal was approved by the FCC on May 10, 1988, and the transaction was consummated on May 14, 1988.

In May 1991, Ed Carroll, Inc., agreed to sell this station to Ashley N. Davis, Jr. The deal was approved by the FCC on June 25, 1991, and the transaction was consummated on August 16, 1991. This change would prove short-lived as Ashley N. Davis, Jr., reached an agreement in March 1992 to sell this station to News/Talk 1560, Inc. The deal was approved by the FCC on June 9, 1992, and the transaction was consummated on August 1, 1992. As part of the sale agreement, the station applied for new call letters and was assigned WTKN on March 2, 1992.

=== WTKN era ===
In December 1997, News/Talk 1560, Inc., agreed to sell WTKN to Joseph A. Adams, Jr. The deal was approved by the FCC on February 12, 1998, and the transaction was consummated on the same day.

In December 2003, Joseph A. Adams, Jr., contracted to sell this station to John H. Beebe for $135,000. At the time of the sale, WTKN broadcast a Gospel music format. The deal was approved by the FCC on March 16, 2004, and the transaction was consummated on April 21, 2004.

Upon contracting to purchase the station from Joseph A. Adams, Jr., John H. Beebe undertook extensive engineering studies and tests to increase the station's broadcast power and reach. Beebe sought out and hired the former head of Clear Channel's AM Engineering Department to perform the studies, measurements, and tests required by the FCC for any broadcast power increase. The result of the extensive collaborative engineering work was a ten-fold increase in the station's broadcast power from 5,000 watts to the FCC maximum 50,000 watts. On April 27, 2004, the FCC granted WTKN a construction permit to change frequencies to 1560 kHz, increase daytime power to 50,000 watts non-directional, and critical hours operational power to 2,500 watts (non-directional). The station was assigned the WCMA call letters by the FCC on February 15, 2005.

=== WCMA era ===
In November 2006, John H. Beebe's Beebe Communications, LLC, reached an agreement to sell WCMA and sister station WTKN (1230 AM, Corinth, Mississippi) to Perihelion Global, Inc. The deal was approved by the FCC on December 29, 2006, and the transaction was consummated on February 8, 2007, for restricted stock. Although the subject of much speculation by bloggers, the restricted stock was not sold and was later exchanged for a promissory note that was not paid, resulting in a financial loss for Beebe.

A request for special temporary authority to take the station silent to complete engineering changes was filed with the FCC on July 14, 2009, and was granted. The station never returned to the air. Under the terms of the Telecommunications Act of 1996, as a matter of law a radio station's broadcast license is subject to automatic forfeiture and cancellation if they fail to broadcast for one full year. In January 2011, the FCC cancelled WCMA's license and deleted the call sign from their database on January 6, 2011.
