= Spanish Broadcasting System =

American media company

Spanish Broadcasting System, Inc.
- Industry: radio/television and Internet
- Founded: Newark, New Jersey, USA (1983)
- Headquarters: Miami, Florida, United States
- Key people: Raúl Alarcón Jr., Chairman President and CEO Pablo Raúl Alarcón Sr., Chairman Emeritus and Director Richard D. Lara, Chief Operating Officer, General Counsel and Secretary
- Revenue: ▲US$177 million (2006)
- Operating income: ▲US$84 million (2006)
- Net income: ▲US$40 million (2006)

Spanish Broadcasting System, Inc. (SBS) is an American media company specializing in Spanish-speaking audiences. It is one of the largest owners and operators of radio stations in the United States. SBS is also invested in television and internet properties, deriving the majority of its income from advertising through its media products.

SBS owns the internet portal LaMusica.com. It also acquired WSBS-TV in Miami, Florida, and WTCV in San Juan, Puerto Rico, the group of owned and operated TV stations for its Mega TV network.

SBS targets the U.S. Hispanic audience in nine geographic regions: Los Angeles, New York, Chicago, Miami, San Francisco, Puerto Rico, Orlando, Tampa, and Houston.

== History ==
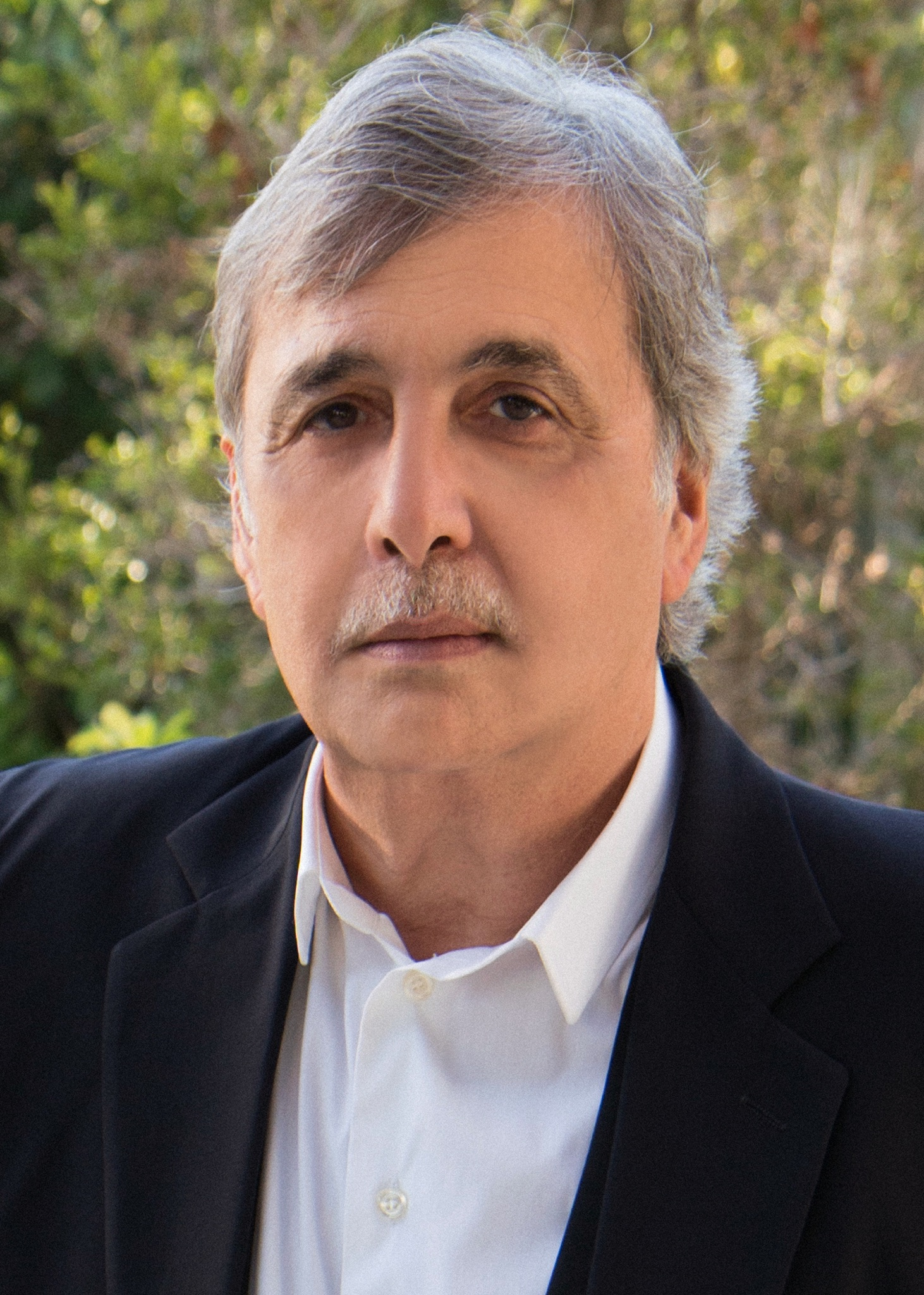
SBS President and CEO Raúl Alarcón Jr.

Spanish Broadcasting System was founded by Pablo Raúl Alarcón Sr., who started in Spanish-language radio broadcasting in the early 1950s when he started his first radio station in Camagüey, Cuba, and his son, Raúl Alarcón Jr. Alarcón Sr. had acquired 14 radio stations by the time he fled Cuba with his family to the United States in 1960. In the U.S. he continued his career as an on-air personality at a New York radio station after arriving in the United States before being promoted to programming director. He subsequently owned a recording studio and advertising agency before borrowing US$3.5 million to purchase the first SBS radio station, WSKQ-AM (La Super 1380) in 1983 with his son, Raúl Alarcón Jr. Alarcón Sr. would serve as SBS Chairman of the board of directors, while his son would serve as an account executive in the sales department.

SBS generated sales of about US$20 million in its first year, confirming the influence of the growing Spanish-speaking audience. Raúl Alarcón Jr. became President of SBS and a director in October 1985. In 1988 SBS purchased its first FM station, regional Mexican KLAX 97.9 FM in Los Angeles. The company went public in the fall of 1991, raising US$435.8 million by selling 21.8 million shares at US$20 per share. SBS bought its third station, New York's WSKQ-FM, in 1989. In 1993 Alfredo Alonso was hired and reformatted it as Mega 97.9, La Mega, surpassing the market's longtime leader, the light rock station WLTW-FM, by 1998. A major turning point for Spanish radio occurred that year when media researchers at Arbitron rated La Mega's morning show number one over that of the radio personality Howard Stern.

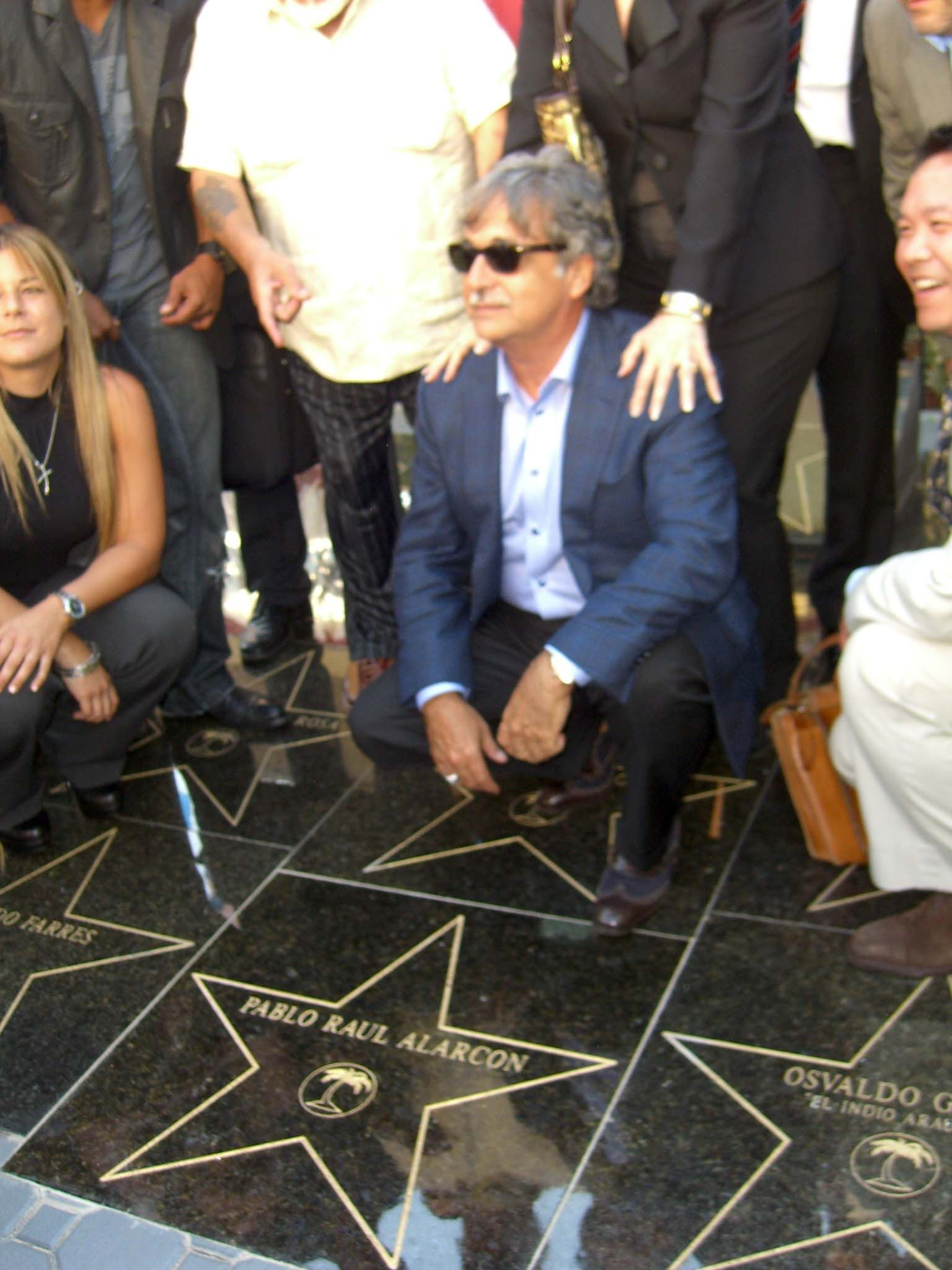
In 2011 Union City, New Jersey honored Pablo Raúl Alarcón with a star on the Walk of Fame at Celia Cruz Plaza.

In 2002 the company created SBS Entertainment, a concert production arm. It also diversified by purchasing 80 percent of JuJu Media, the operator of the Spanish-English Web site LaMusica.com, which offered Latin music, entertainment, news, and culture. Later that year, at the insistence of Alarcón Jr., SBS launched KZAB-FM (La Sabrosa 93.5), targeting the Central American population in Los Angeles. In 2003, WSKQ was the most listened-to Spanish-language radio station in the United States. That year Alarcón Jr. told Billboard magazine, "My opinion is that radio programming continues to be an art. It is not a science. I will not argue with the fact that research gives you a good indication, a good road map."

Raúl Alarcón Jr. is the current chief executive officer of SBS, a position he has held since June 1994. He also succeeded his father as chairman of the board of directors on November 2, 1999. Alarcón Sr. would continue to serve as chairman emeritus. Alarcón Jr. is responsible for the company's long-range strategic planning and operational matters, and according to SBS's website, is instrumental in the acquisition and related financing of each SBS station.

In 2004, Viacom purchased a 10% stake on SBS, Viacom's response to Univision-HBC merger, SBS was combined with Viacom's Infinity Broadcasting.

In 2009, Raúl Alarcón Sr. was posthumously inducted into Billboard's Latin Music Hall of Fame. On June 3, 2011, the heavily Cuban-American community of Union City, New Jersey honored Alarcón Sr. with a star on the Walk of Fame at Celia Cruz Plaza. Raúl Alarcón Jr. was present to accept the honors for his father.

SBS said it would sell Mega TV in 2023 to Voz Media, a conservative Spanish-language news media firm based in Texas, pending approval by the Federal Communications Commission. On September 22, SBS terminated the deal after the buyer breached its agreement to close the deal by the Sept. 15 deadline the two companies agreed to.

In April 2026, SBS filed for prepackaged Chapter 11 bankruptcy protection as part of a restructuring deal with creditors to significantly reduce debt, lowering interest expense, extending the company's maturity notes until 2030, and supported funds via accounts managed by Brigade Capital, Man Group and Bayside Capital.

== Radio ==
SBS radio stations use one of six programming formats:

- Spanish tropical: salsa music, merengue, bachata, reggaetón dance music
- Regional Mexican: ranchera, norteña, banda, cumbia music typically originating from regions of Mexico
- Spanish adult contemporary: soft romantic ballads, Spanish pop music
- Spanish oldies: Latin/English music classics from the 1960s, 1970s, and 1980s
- American top 40: current pop music hits
- Hurban: (Hispanic Urban) reggaetón dance music

=== Los Angeles, California ===
- KLAX-FM 97.9 La Raza HD1 (regional Mexican) / La Privada 97.9 HD2 (fusion of Regional Mexican and Urban)
- KXOL-FM Mega 96.3 HD1 (pop) / Mega 96.3 HD2 (Spanish Tropical)

=== San Francisco, California ===
- KRZZ 93.3 La Raza (Regional Mexican) / La Privada 93.3 HD2 (fusion of Regional Mexican and Urban)

=== Houston, Texas ===
- KROI La Ley 92.1 (Regional Mexican) / La Privada 92.1 HD2 (fusion of Regional Mexican and Urban)

=== Chicago, Illinois ===
- WLEY-FM La Ley 107.9 (Regional Mexican) / La Privada 107.9 HD2 (fusion of Regional Mexican and Urban) / Mega 107.9 HD3 (Spanish Tropical/Simulcasting WSKQ-FM: Mega 97.9)

=== New York, New York ===
- WSKQ-FM Mega 97.9 HD1 (Spanish Tropical)
- WPAT-FM 93.1 Amor HD1 (Spanish Tropical) / La Privada 93.1 HD2 (fusion of Regional Mexican and Urban)

=== Puerto Rico ===
- WMEG La Mega 106.9 HD1 (CHR - Latin/American top 40) / La Megaestación 106.9 HD2 (American CHR)
- WEGM La Mega 95.1 (CHR - Latin/American top 40)
- WRXD Estereotempo 96.5 (Spanish adult contemporary)
- WZNA Estereotempo 1040 (Spanish adult contemporary)
- WZNT Zeta 93.7 HD1 (Spanish tropical) / La Privada 93.7 HD2 (fusion of Regional Mexican and Urban)
- WZMT Zeta 93.3 (Spanish tropical)
- WIOB Zeta 97.5 HD1 (Spanish tropical) / Estereotempo 97.5 HD2 (Spanish adult contemporary) / Viva 97.5 HD3 (Spanish variety)
- WODA La Nueva 94.7 HD1 (urban)
- WNOD La Nueva 94.1 (urban)

=== Miami, Florida ===
- WXDJ El Zol 106.7 HD1 (Spanish tropical)
- WCMQ-FM Zeta 92.3 HD1 (Romantic Salsa & Spanish Love AC songs)
- WRMA Ritmo 95.7 HD1 (Cubatón) / La Privada 95.7 HD2 (fusion of Regional Mexican and Urban)
- WRAZ Caracol Radio America 106.3 (Spanish Talk & News /Simulcasting WCMQ-FM)
- WMFM El Zol 107.9 (Spanish tropical)

=== Orlando, Florida ===
- WPYO El Nuevo Zol 95.3 (Spanish tropical) / La Privada 95.3 HD2 (fusion of Regional Mexican and Urban) / Salsa 95.3 HD3 (Spanish Tropical)

=== Tampa, Florida ===
- WSUN (FM) El Nuevo Zol 97.1 (Spanish tropical) / La Privada 97.1 HD2 (fusion of Regional Mexican and Urban)

=== Affiliated Stations In Monterrey, Mexico ===
- XET-FM La Caliente 94.1 (Grupera)
- XHLUPE-FM La Lupe 105.3 (Spanish Hits)
- XHITS-FM Hits 106.1 (Pop)
- XHPJ-FM Classic 106.9 (Classic Rock)

SBS launched AIRE Radio Networks in 2014.

== Internet ==
In addition to individual radio station websites, SBS operates www.lamusica.com and www.mega.tv, all providing bilingual Spanish-English content about Latin music, entertainment and news.

== Television ==
Mega TV was launched on March 1, 2006 and operates as a Spanish-language entertainment station in South Florida, Puerto Rico and Las Vegas. The station's programming targets a young, U.S. Hispanic audience through televised radio-branded shows and general entertainment programs (music, celebrity, debate, interviews, personality based shows). Seventy percent of Mega TV's programming is in-house created. Mega TV is also available nationwide on DirecTV and AT&T U-Verse.

== Stations ==
Stations are arranged alphabetically by state and by city of license.

=== Current ===
City of license / Market	Station	Channel		Owned Since
City of license / Market	Station	Virtual	RF	Owned Since
Key West/Miami, Florida	WSBS-TV	22	3	2006
Key West/Miami, Florida	WSBS-CD	22	50	2006
San Juan, Puerto Rico	WTCV	18	21	2014
Ponce, Puerto Rico	WVOZ-TV	18	36	2014
Aguadilla/Mayaguez, Puerto Rico	WVEO	18	17	2014
Houston, Texas	KBMN-LD	40		

== Arbitron lawsuit ==
Arbitron (now known as Nielsen Audio) sued SBS in order to force it to reinstall encoders used for the Portable People Meter system of audience measurement. SBS and other members of the PPM Coalition contended that the PPM system has had a major negative impact on their ratings and therefore revenue, and asked the Federal Communications Commission (FCC) in investigate. Arbitron sued SBS for breach of a 2007 contract, including US$2.5 million in payments owed since 2009. In February 2010, a court ordered SBS to reinstate, at least temporarily, the coding of its radio broadcasts for measurement by Arbitron.
