= WCMQ-FM =

Salsa radio station in Hialeah–Miami

- Hialeah, Florida; United States
- Broadcast area: Miami–Fort Lauderdale; Hollywood, Florida
- Frequency: 92.3 MHz (HD Radio)
- Branding: Zeta 92.3

Programming
- Language: Spanish
- Format: Salsa music – hot AC
- Subchannels: HD2: Talk (WRAZ-FM)

Ownership
- Owner: Spanish Broadcasting System; (WCMQ Licensing, Inc.)
- Sister stations: WXDJ/WMFM; WRMA; WRAZ-FM; WSBS-TV

History
- First air date: December 22, 1969
- Former call signs: WHMS (1969–1972); WQXK (1972–1974)
- Former frequencies: 92.1 MHz (1969–1987)
- Call sign meaning: Named after the former CMQ in Havana

Technical information
- Licensing authority: FCC
- Facility ID: 61640
- Class: C2
- ERP: 17,000 watts
- HAAT: 261 meters (856 ft)
- Transmitter coordinates: 25°46′29.00″N 80°11′19.00″W
- Translator: HD2: 106.3 W292GE (Miami)

Links
- Public license information: Public file; LMS
- Webcast: Listen live
- Website: www.lamusica.com/stations/wcmq

WCMQ-FM (92.3 FM, "Zeta 92.3") is a commercial radio station licensed to Hialeah, Florida, United States, and serving the Miami-Fort Lauderdale market. It is owned by the Spanish Broadcasting System and airs a mix of salsa music with Spanish hot adult contemporary. WCMQ-FM's studios are at the Raul Alarcon Broadcast Center on Northwest 77th Avenue in Medley.

WCMQ-FM has an effective radiated power (ERP) of 17,000 watts. The transmitter is atop the Panorama Tower in the Brickell district of Downtown Miami.

== History ==
The station signed on the air on December 22, 1969. The call sign was originally WHMS-FM, broadcasting at 92.1 MHz. It was only powered at 3,000 watts. WHMS-FM was owned by the Flamingo Broadcasting Company on East 2nd Street and played middle of the road (MOR) and easy listening music. In 1972, it changed its call letters to WQXK and aired a country music format.

That ended in 1974, when the station decided to serve Miami's growing Hispanic community. The language switched to Spanish and the station began playing oldies that were well-known in Cuba, Puerto Rico and the Dominican Republic from past decades. The station changed its call sign to WCMQ, named after CMQ (640 AM), one of the most popular radio stations in Havana prior to 1960. Over time, the oldies were reduced as WCMQ began concentrating on Spanish classic hits from more recent decades.

On April 1, 2012, WCMQ-FM changed its format from Spanish classic hits to salsa music, branded as "Zeta 92.3".

On October 31, 2019, the radio began playing an occasional English-language hit amid the Spanish-language music, with the focus being on songs from the 1970s through 1990s.
