= WMFM =

Radio station in Key West, Florida

- Key West, Florida; United States
- Broadcast area: Florida Keys area
- Frequency: 107.9 MHz

Programming
- Format: Spanish Tropical (simulcast of WXDJ)

Ownership
- Owner: South Broadcasting System, Inc.
- Sister stations: WXDJ, WRMA, WRAZ-FM, WCMQ-FM

History
- First air date: January 18, 1991 (as WWFT)
- Former call signs: WWFT (1991–1993); WSKP (1993–1997); WVMQ (1997–2000); WRLA (2000–2001)

Technical information
- Licensing authority: FCC
- Facility ID: 14665
- Class: C1
- ERP: 1,200 watts
- HAAT: 60 meters
- Transmitter coordinates: 24°40′35.00″N 81°30′41.00″W

Links
- Public license information: Public file; LMS
- Website: lamusica.com

WMFM (107.9 FM) is a radio station broadcasting a Spanish Tropical format. Licensed to Key West, Florida, United States, the station serves the Florida Keys area. The station simulcasts WXDJ In Miami, and is currently owned by South Broadcasting System, Inc., It is operated by Spanish Broadcasting System under a Local marketing agreement.

== History ==
The station went on the air as WWFT on January 18, 1991. On September 3, 1993, the station changed its call sign to WSKP; on November 21, 1997 to WVMQ; on April 5, 2000 to WRLA; & on July 1, 2001 to the current WMFM.
