= WODA =

Radio station in Bayamón, Puerto Rico

- Bayamón; Puerto Rico
- Broadcast area: San Juan, Puerto Rico
- Frequency: 94.7 MHz (HD Radio)
- Branding: La Nueva 94 FM

Programming
- Languages: Spanish and English
- Format: Reggaeton–Urban AC

Ownership
- Owner: Spanish Broadcasting System; (Spanish Broadcasting System Holding Company)
- Sister stations: WZNT, WZMT, WRXD, WMEG

History
- First air date: December 13, 1963; 62 years ago
- Former call signs: WBYM (1963–1978); WEYA-FM (1979–1980); WGSX (1980–1992); WLDI (1992–1995); WCOM (1995–2002)
- Call sign meaning: Onda (Spanish for wave)

Technical information
- Licensing authority: FCC
- Facility ID: 54471
- Class: B
- ERP: 50,000 watts
- HAAT: 898.0 meters (2,946.2 ft)
- Transmitter coordinates: 18°16′44″N 65°51′35.9″W

Links
- Public license information: Public file; LMS
- Website: https://lanueva94.com/

WNOD
- Mayagüez; Puerto Rico
- Frequency: 94.1 MHz
- Branding: La Nueva 94 FM

Programming
- Languages: Spanish and English
- Format: Reggaeton–Urban AC

Ownership
- Owner: Spanish Broadcasting System; (Spanish Broadcasting System Holding Company)
- Sister stations: WIOB, WEGM, WZNA

History
- First air date: June 13, 1967; 59 years ago
- Former call signs: WOYE-FM (1967–2002); WPRU-FM (2002)

Technical information
- Licensing authority: FCC
- Facility ID: 53554
- Class: B
- ERP: 35,000 watts
- HAAT: 643.0 meters (2,109.6 ft)
- Transmitter coordinates: 18°58′58″N 66°59′19″W
- Translator: W276AI (103.1 MHz) Ponce

Links
- Public license information: Public file; LMS

WODA is a radio station in Bayamón, Puerto Rico. The station airs at 94.7 FM and it is known commercially as La Nueva 94 FM or La 94. It has a sister station, WNOD airing at 94.1 FM in Mayagüez, covering the western part of Puerto Rico and simulcasting WODA programming.

The station is relayed through booster station, WODA-FM1 in Ceiba, also operating at 94.7 FM and translator station W276AI 103.1 FM in Ponce.

== History ==
The station was founded on December 13, 1963, as WBYM, and broadcast its Beautiful music format. The station operates at 94.7 FM, and was assigned to Radio Aeropuerto, Inc, the owners of WRAI-AM.

== WEYA, Radio Femenina ==
Originally this radio station was owned and operated by Carlos Pirallo and was named WEYA which means "Ella" or "She", Radio Femenina and it was playing Beautiful Music with an automated system. Then in the early 1980s changed its call letters to WGSX with the "g" forming a 9 and S like a 5 and it was called 95X, with soft rock format.

== WGSX, 95X ==
During the 1980s the station was branded as 95X and its format was CHR/pop airing music from the 1980s pop and rock top stars. WGSX was an affiliate of Casey Kasem's American Top 40 throughout the 1980s.

== WLDI, Oldies 94.7 ==
In 1992, the station changed to an Oldies music format airing Top 40 music from the 1950s, 1960s and 1970s. The station was known commercially as Oldies 94.7. also changing the call letters to WLDI.

== Cosmos 94 FM/Onda 94 ==
WNOD began transmissions in early 1960s as WOYE-FM, the station was founded by Gilbert Mamery, the owner of WTIL-AM, and later owned by Pepino Broadcasters, Inc. managed by the Bonnet Alvarez family. In the 1970s the station was acquired by Prime Time Radio Corporation, and was changed to a Spanish Variety format branded as Cosmos 94, La Estación Espacial Musical. The programs that made history at the station was, El Meneo de la Mañana, La Hora del Rocheo, Astro Rock, Enlace Romántico and La Movida en Diez.

In 1995, the station was acquired by Primedia Broadcasting, Inc. and once again changed format and brand name, expanding the Cosmos 94 name across Puerto Rico. Originally geared toward an ever-growing group of underground rap followers, the station was branded as Cosmos 94 FM, Tu Emisora Radioactiva. However the underground rap music format lasted just for a month and was changed to a CHR/Latin pop format. It was then sold to the Spanish Broadcasting System in 1998. The new owners turned it into a Rock en Español station, a format that lasted until 2002. Before changing the brand to "Onda 94" the last words spoken by the DJ was a quote that says "The human spirit does not die when it's defeated, it dies when it surrenders". During the last couple of hours of transmission as "Cosmos 94" various artists took part of the live broadcast as a sort of tribute to it. After that, it was rebranded as Onda 94, changing again to a top 40 format.

== Reggaeton 94 ==
On May 1, 2005, The station changed the format and now plays a reggaeton format branded as Reggaeton 94 FM. El Despelote was moved from La Mega to Reggaeton 94 in 2008.

== La Nueva 94 ==
In January 2012, WODA changed its current reggaeton format and now still plays an Urban AC format branded as La Nueva 94 FM. Some of the programming on WODA can be also listen via LaMusica App.

== Programming ==
- El Despelote
- What's Up
- El Barrio 94
- D'Party
- TBT 94
- Buzzer Beater

== Translator stations ==
Broadcast translator for WNOD
Call sign	Frequency	City of license	FID	ERP (W)	FCC info
W276AI	103.1 FM	Ponce, Puerto Rico	53553	.1	LMS

== Logos ==
WODA old logo when it was known commercially as Onda 94.

== WODA Branding ==
- FM94 (1963 to 1978)
- Radio Femenina 94.7 (1978 to 1980)
- 95X (1980 to 1992)
- Oldies 94.7 (1992 to 1995)
- Cosmos 94 (1995 to 2002)
- Onda 94 (2002 to 2005)
- Reggaeton 94 (2005 to 2012)
- La Nueva 94 (2012 to present)

== WNOD Branding ==
- Oye FM (1967 to 1975)
- Cosmos 94 (1975 to 2002)
- Onda 94 (2002 to 2005)
- Reggaeton 94 (2005 to 2012)
- La Nueva 94 (2012 to present)
