= WIOB =

Radio station in Mayagüez, Puerto Rico

- Mayagüez, Puerto Rico; Puerto Rico
- Broadcast area: Puerto Rico area
- Frequency: 97.5 MHz (HD Radio)
- Branding: Zeta 93

Programming
- Format: Spanish Tropical
- Subchannels: HD2: WRXD simulcast (Adult Contemporary); HD3: Viva 95 FM (Spanish variety format)

Ownership
- Owner: Spanish Broadcasting System (HD3 and W238CR leased to Aurio A. Matos Barreto); (Spanish Broadcasting System Holding Company, Inc.)
- Sister stations: WRXD, WZNA, WZNT, WZMT, WODA, WNOD, WMEG, WEGM

History
- First air date: 1956; 70 years ago
- Former call signs: WORA-FM (1956–1977); WIOA (1977–1985)

Technical information
- Licensing authority: FCC
- Facility ID: 8153
- Class: B
- ERP: 50,000 watts
- HAAT: 891.0 meters (2,923.2 ft)
- Transmitter coordinates: 18°19′33″N 67°50′53.9″W
- Translators: 95.5 W238CR (Mayagüez, relays HD3)

Links
- Public license information: Public file; LMS
- Website: www.zeta93.fm www.estereotempo.fm (HD2) www.viva95fm.com (HD3)

WIOB (97.5 FM), branded on-air as Zeta 93, is a radio station broadcasting a Spanish Tropical format. Licensed to Mayaguez, Puerto Rico, the station serves the Puerto Rico area. WIOB was founded in 1956 by Alfredo Ramírez de Arellano y Bartoli as WORA-FM, the first FM radio station established in Puerto Rico. The station is currently owned by Spanish Broadcasting System Holding Company, Inc. WIOB's programming is also heard on booster station, WIOB-FM1 in San Germán.

WIOB broadcasts in the HD Radio format, and carries additional programming on two of the station's HD subchannels. In addition, WIOB-HD3's programming is simulcast on translator station W238CR 95.5 FM in Mayagüez, which is owned by Aurio A. Matos Barreto.

On February 1, 2018, WIOB left the Estereotempo Network after 41 years and switched to the repeater of the Zeta 93 Salsa Network.

== Translator stations ==
Broadcast translator for WIOB-HD3
| Call sign | Frequency | City of license | FID | ERP (W) | FCC info |
|---|---|---|---|---|---|
| W238CR | 95.5 FM | Mayagüez, Puerto Rico | 140950 | .25 | LMS |
