= WZNT =

Radio station in San Juan, Puerto Rico

- San Juan, Puerto Rico; Puerto Rico
- Broadcast area: Puerto Rico
- Frequency: 93.7 MHz (HD Radio)
- Branding: Zeta 93

Programming
- Format: Spanish Tropical
- Subchannels: HD2: Regional Mexican "La Privada"

Ownership
- Owner: Spanish Broadcasting System; (Spanish Broadcasting System Holding Company, Inc.)
- Sister stations: WZMT, WIOB, WODA, WNOD, WRXD, WZNA, WMEG, WEGM

History
- First air date: 1959; 67 years ago
- Former call signs: WITA-FM (1959–1970); WJIT-FM (1970–1975); WSRA (1975–1978)

Technical information
- Licensing authority: FCC
- Facility ID: 74552
- Class: B
- ERP: 50,000 watts
- HAAT: 801.0 meters (2,628.0 ft)
- Transmitter coordinates: 18°25′55″N 66°57′15″W

Links
- Public license information: Public file; LMS
- Webcast: Listen Live
- Website: zeta93.fm La Privada HD2

WZNT (93.7 FM), branded on-air as Zeta 93, is a radio station broadcasting a Spanish Tropical format. Licensed to San Juan, Puerto Rico, it serves the entire commonwealth through one of the strongest FM signals on the island. The station is owned by the Spanish Broadcasting System (SBS) and forms part of SBS Puerto Rico’s multi-media cluster that includes radio, television, and digital platforms.

Zeta 93 is widely considered one of the most influential salsa and tropical music stations in the Caribbean, known for its long-running on-air personalities, concerts, and cultural events.

== History ==
WZNT traces its origins to 1959 as WITA-FM, originally programmed with popular and contemporary music. Over the decades, it underwent several call sign and format changes as Puerto Rico’s radio landscape evolved.

=== Early years (1959–1978) ===
- 1959 — WITA-FM: signed on with a middle-of-the-road music format.
- 1970 — WJIT-FM: adopted a rhythmic format aligned with WJIT 1250 AM.
- 1975 — WSRA: shifted toward contemporary Spanish-language hits.

=== Launch of Zeta 93 (1978–present) ===
In 1978, the station became WZNT and launched the Zeta 93 brand. It focused on salsa, bolero, and tropical rhythms, becoming a flagship station during Puerto Rico’s salsa boom.

By the 1980s and 1990s, Zeta 93 was among the island’s top-rated stations, known for premieres of major salsa artists, exclusive interviews, and festival sponsorships.

=== Digital and HD Radio Era ===
WZNT adopted HD Radio in the 2010s, adding an HD2 subchannel dedicated to Regional Mexican under the brand La Privada.

The station also began streaming through the SBS-owned LaMusica app, expanding its global audience.

== Format ==
Zeta 93 broadcasts salsa, merengue, bachata, tropical pop, and talk segments centered on Puerto Rican culture.

== Programming ==
Zeta 93 features several popular local shows and personalities:

- Nación Z – morning news/talk.
- Nación Z Nacional
- La Manada de la Z
- El Búho Loco
- El Cacique
- El Hachero
- El Chamo

=== Longtime and notable hosts ===
Several well-known personalities have appeared on Zeta 93.

== Events ==
Zeta 93 organizes and sponsors major cultural events:

=== Salsa Awards and Festivals ===
- Zeta 93 Salsa National Day
- Festival de la Salsa
- Día Nacional de la Z

=== Community involvement ===
The station participates in charity drives and relief efforts.

== HD Radio ==
- HD1: Main Zeta 93 format
- HD2 – "La Privada": Regional Mexican

== Coverage and technical details ==
With 50,000 watts ERP and an 801 m HAAT, WZNT provides islandwide coverage.

== Ownership ==
WZNT is part of the Spanish Broadcasting System radio group.
