= KXOL-FM =

Spanish-language contemporary hit radio station in Los Angeles

- Los Angeles, California; United States
- Broadcast area: Greater Los Angeles
- Frequency: 96.3 MHz
- Branding: Mega 96.3 fm

Programming
- Language: Spanish
- Format: Contemporary hit radio

Ownership
- Owner: Spanish Broadcasting System; (KXOL Licensing, Inc.)
- Sister stations: KLAX-FM

History
- First air date: 1949
- Former call signs: KRKD-FM (1949–1970); KFSG (1970–2001)
- Call sign meaning: Similar to "sol", the Spanish word for "sun"

Technical information
- Licensing authority: FCC
- Facility ID: 28848
- Class: B
- ERP: 6,600 watts
- HAAT: 398 meters (1,306 ft)
- Transmitter coordinates: 34°11′48.0″N 118°15′33.3″W
- Repeater: 96.3 KXOL-FM-1 (Santa Clarita)

Links
- Public license information: Public file; LMS
- Website: www.lamusica.com/en/stations/kxol

KXOL-FM (96.3 FM "Mega 96.3") is a commercial radio station in Los Angeles. It is owned by the Spanish Broadcasting System and airs a Latin pop radio format. KXOL-FM's studios and offices are on West Pico Boulevard. Its transmitter is located in the Verdugo Mountains, near Glendale, California. KXOL-FM is also heard on a 14-watt booster station in Santa Clarita, KXOL-FM-1 at 96.3 MHz.

== History ==
=== Early years ===
The station first signed on as KRKD-FM, owned by Radio Broadcasters, Incorporated. It was the FM sister station to AM 1150 KRKD (now KEIB). Continental Telecasting Corporation acquired the station in 1955, followed by Trans American Broadcasting Corporation in 1959. Two years later, Trans American sold the station to the International Church of the Foursquare Gospel as part of the consolidation of KRKD and its time share partner, KFSG, which both took turns broadcasting on 1150 kHz. Both the AM and FM stations aired a Christian radio format.

=== Foursquare Gospel Church ===
In the late 1960s, KRKD AM and FM were partially simulcast, but KRKD-FM broke occasionally for theatrical performances and opera. In 1970, Foursquare sold off the AM station and moved the KFSG call sign (meaning "Foursquare Gospel") to the FM station on June 8 of that year. KFSG aired Southern Gospel music along with religious programming produced by the church along with syndicated staples like "Focus on the Family", "Joni and Friends", "Insight for Living" and "In Touch Ministries". The station's schedule was about 50% music and 50% teaching programs.

For years, the station played traditional Christian music with Christian contemporary music heard for only a few hours a week on Saturday. But by 1981, KFSG began to mix in softer contemporary Christian songs into the format. By 1987, KFSG was a Christian adult contemporary station playing such artists as Twila Paris, Steven Curtis Chapman, Amy Grant, David Meece, Randy Stonehill, PFR and White Heart.

=== Sale to SBS ===
After fifty years of owning KFSG, the Foursquare Church sold the station in 2003, to the Spanish Broadcasting System. It was a $250 million sale. On April 30, 2001, KFSG moved its programming and call sign to FM 93.5 in Redondo Beach (now KDAY), but dropped the music and went with all-religious talk programming full-time. SBS owned the station at 93.5 and leased it to Foursquare as part of its purchase of the more powerful 96.3 frequency. (93.5 operated at 6,000 watts while 96.3 ran 54,000 watts). In 2003, the 93.5 lease ended and SBS regained control of the station, ending Foursquare's run in Southern California radio.

On May 9, 2001, SBS flipped 96.3 a Spanish adult contemporary format, changing the call letters to KXOL-FM. The station became El Sol 96.3 ("The Sun 96.3") with Sylvia Villagran as the first woman to host a morning radio show in Los Angeles. According to Arbitron between 2001 and 2004, the show garnered high ratings, consistently placing it among the top three morning shows in Los Angeles. "El Sol" was one of two Spanish AC radio stations in Los Angeles until May 2005, when its format change left KLVE as the only station in L.A. airing a softer adult Latin format.

=== Lawsuit with Emmis Communications ===
In 2005, SBS decided to drop KXOL's Spanish adult contemporary format for hurban (Spanish urban contemporary). The abrupt switch violated a transmitter lease agreement that SBS, had with Emmis Communications, the owner of KXOL's transmitter site. The agreement required formal notification to Emmis of any change in KXOL's format and expressly prohibited the station from programming to directly compete with Emmis' English-language rhythmic outlet KPWR. SBS switched formats anyway, and Emmis filed a lawsuit to force SBS to either drop the format or find a new transmitter. SBS announced that KXOL would move to another transmitter site a month later, and both parties settled the dispute.

=== Latino 96.3 and LA 96.3 ===
KXOL had success as a Latin urban outlet, partly due to KXOL snatching some of (the now-defunct) KKBT and KPWR's Hispanic listeners. Around 2010, it had begun to tilt its direction towards Latin hip-hop as "Latino 96.3", but still remain within the urban arena. By May 2012, KXOL dropped the "Latino 96.3" moniker and replaced it with the newer but shortened "LA 96.3". KXOL began using the slogan "L.A.'s Party Station". The playlist has also shifted further towards a conventional Rhythmic direction except for a handful of urban tracks. By late 2012, the station rebranded back to "Latino 96.3" with a blend of Spanish and English rhythmic hits.

=== Mega 96.3 ===
On May 16, 2014, at 2 pm, KXOL changed their format back to Spanish AC as Mega 96.3 to compete with KLVE K-Love 107.5. By November 2014, KXOL switched to a Spanish contemporary hit radio format, still calling itself "Mega 96.3" while returning to the slogan "LA's Party Station".
