= WMEG =

Radio station in Guayama–San Juan, Puerto Rico

- Guayama, Puerto Rico; Puerto Rico
- Broadcast area: San Juan, Puerto Rico
- Frequency: 106.9 MHz (HD Radio)
- Branding: La Mega

Programming
- Languages: Spanish and English
- Format: Top 40/CHR
- Subchannels: HD2: American CHR "La Megaestación Digital"

Ownership
- Owner: Spanish Broadcasting System; (WMEG Licensing, Inc.)
- Sister stations: WEGM, WZNT, WZMT, WIOB, WODA, WNOD, WRXD, WZNA

History
- First air date: 1966; 60 years ago
- Former call signs: WXRF-FM (1966–1983); WSRA (1983–1991)
- Call sign meaning: MEGa

Technical information
- Licensing authority: FCC
- Facility ID: 32157
- Class: B
- ERP: 50,000 watts
- HAAT: 828.0 meters (2,716.5 ft)
- Transmitter coordinates: 18°56′40.8″N 66°53′35.5″W
- Repeater: 95.1 WEGM (San Germán)

Links
- Public license information: Public file; LMS
- Webcast: Listen Live; Listen Live (HD2)
- Website: lamega.fm Megaestación Digital (HD2)

WMEG (106.9 FM), branded on-air as La Mega, is a radio station broadcasting a bilingual Top 40/CHR format. Licensed to Guayama, Puerto Rico, it serves the greater San Juan area. The station is currently owned by WMEG Licensing, Inc., a division of the Spanish Broadcasting System. Until 2004, La Mega 106.9 FM had an American Alternative Top 40 format. In 2004 the station began to air Reggaeton music along with the original format. In the latter part of 2006 and early 2007, the station began to air Latin Top 40 Rock along with Reggaeton music and airing more pop and hip-hop than rock. As of 2008 the station distances completely from the original format airing about 80% of Latin Top 40 music, 10% of American Top 40 and 10% of reggaeton.

== Programming ==
- El Circo de La Mega
- La Guerrilla
- La Megamezcla con Alex Sensation
- El Mega Reguero
