= WRAZ-FM =

- Leisure City, Florida; United States
- Broadcast area: Florida
- Frequency: 106.3 MHz
- Branding: Caracol America 106.3

Programming
- Format: Talk radio
- Affiliations: Caracol Radio

Ownership
- Owner: South Broadcasting System, Inc.
- Operator: Spanish Broadcasting System
- Sister stations: WMFM, WCMQ-FM, WXDJ, WRMA, WSBS-TV

History
- First air date: November 21, 1985; 40 years ago
- Former call signs: WVBH (1985–1989); WZMQ (1989–1999); WXTF (1999); WZMQ (1999–2000); WRAU (2000–2001); WZMQ (2001–2008)
- Call sign meaning: W RAZa (former branding)

Technical information
- Licensing authority: FCC
- Facility ID: 61646
- Class: C2
- ERP: 50,000 watts
- HAAT: 94 meters (308 ft)
- Transmitter coordinates: 25°14′07″N 80°19′35″W

Links
- Public license information: Public file; LMS
- Website: www.lamusica.com/stations/wraz

WRAZ-FM (106.3 MHz) is a radio station broadcasting a Talk radio format. Licensed to Leisure City, Florida, United States, the station is owned by South Broadcasting System, Inc. It is operated by Spanish Broadcasting System under a local marketing agreement.

== History ==
The station went on the air as WVBH on November 21, 1985. On October 2, 1989, the station changed its call sign to WZMQ on February 15, 1999, to WXTF; on March 2, 1999, back to WZMQ; on March 22, 2000, to WRAU; on July 1, 2001, to WZMQ once again; and on January 22, 2008, to the current WRAZ-FM.

On November 25, 2021, WRAZ-FM changed its format from Latin to salsa, branded as "Salsa 106.3".

As of September 2024, WRAZ-FM switched to a simulcast of WCMQ-FM.
