= WRMA =

Radio station in North Miami Beach, Florida

- North Miami Beach, Florida; United States
- Broadcast area: Miami area
- Frequency: 95.7 MHz (HD Radio)
- Branding: Ritmo 95.7

Programming
- Format: Cubatón
- Subchannels: HD2: Regional Mexican "La Privada"

Ownership
- Owner: Spanish Broadcasting System; (WXDJ Licensing, Inc.)
- Sister stations: WXDJ/WMFM, WCMQ-FM, WRAZ-FM WSBS-TV

History
- First air date: 1986 (as WRFM)
- Former call signs: WRFM (1986–1987); WXDJ (1987–2014)
- Call sign meaning: Ritmo MiAmi

Technical information
- Licensing authority: FCC
- Facility ID: 48368
- Class: C2
- ERP: 17,000 watts
- HAAT: 261 meters (856 ft)
- Transmitter coordinates: 25°43′56″N 80°14′4″W

Links
- Public license information: Public file; LMS
- Website: ritmo95.lamusica.com

WRMA (95.7 FM) is a radio station broadcasting a Cubatón format. Licensed to North Miami Beach, Florida, United States, the station serves the Miami metropolitan area. The station is owned by Spanish Broadcasting System subsidiary WXDJ Licensing, Inc.

== History ==
The station was assigned the call letters WRFM on July 8, 1986. On May 12, 1987, the station changed its call sign to WXDJ, and on January 7, 2014, to the current WRMA. The station's original format was new age jazz and it was called both The Wave and The Breeze. On August 15, 2016, WRMA changed formats to Cuban reggaetón or Cubatón, rebranded as "Ritmo 95.7".
