= WZMT =

Radio station licensed to Ponce, Puerto Rico

- Ponce, Puerto Rico; Puerto Rico
- Broadcast area: Puerto Rico
- Frequency: 93.3 MHz
- Branding: Zeta 93

Programming
- Format: Spanish Tropical

Ownership
- Owner: Spanish Broadcasting System; (Spanish Broadcasting System Holding Company, Inc.)
- Sister stations: WZNT, WIOB, WODA, WNOD, WRXD, WZNA, WMEG, WEGM

History
- First air date: 1969; 57 years ago
- Former call signs: WPAB-FM (1969–1976); WOQI-FM (1976–1999)
- Call sign meaning: Zeta; Música; Tropical

Technical information
- Licensing authority: FCC
- Facility ID: 53076
- Class: B
- ERP: 54,500 watts
- HAAT: 826.0 meters (2,710.0 ft)
- Transmitter coordinates: 18°59′18″N 66°37′41.9″W

Links
- Public license information: Public file; LMS
- Website: zeta93.fm

WZMT (93.3 FM), branded on-air as Zeta 93, is a radio station licensed to Ponce, Puerto Rico, the station serves the Puerto Rico area. The station is currently owned by Spanish Broadcasting System Holding Company, Inc.
