= WEGM =

Radio station in San Germán, Puerto Rico

- San Germán, Puerto Rico; Puerto Rico
- Broadcast area: Mayagüez, Puerto Rico / Western Puerto Rico
- Frequency: 95.1 MHz
- Branding: Mega 95.1

Programming
- Format: Rhythmic Contemporary Hit Radio

Ownership
- Owner: Spanish Broadcasting System; (Spanish Broadcasting System Holding Company, Inc.)
- Sister stations: WMEG, WZNT, WZMT, WODA, WNOD, WRXD, WIOB

History
- First air date: February 1, 1969; 57 years ago
- Former call signs: WRPC (1969–1996); WCTA-FM (1996–2001)
- Call sign meaning: W Español German Mega

Technical information
- Licensing authority: FCC
- Facility ID: 1890
- Class: B
- ERP: 25,000 watts
- HAAT: 854.0 meters (2,801.8 ft)
- Transmitter coordinates: 18°58′54.9″N 66°58′55″W

Links
- Public license information: Public file; LMS
- Website: http://www.lamega.fm

WEGM (95.1 FM), branded on-air as Mega 95.1, is a radio station broadcasting a rhythmic contemporary hit radio format. Licensed to San Germán, Puerto Rico, the station serves the western Puerto Rico area. The station is currently owned by Spanish Broadcasting System Holding Company, Inc.

== History ==
The station went on the air as WRPC on February 1, 1969, that stands for "Radio Porta Coeli". It is remembered for its "Radio Heavy", "Radio Color" and "Zeta 95" monikers. On June 4, 1996, the station changed its call sign to WCTA-FM, and on March 31, 2001 to the current WEGM.
