= WLEY-FM =

Regional Mexican radio station in Aurora–Chicago, Illinois

- Aurora, Illinois; United States
- Broadcast area: Chicago, Illinois; Aurora-Elgin-Wheaton, Illinois; Joliet-Naperville, Illinois
- Frequency: 107.9 MHz (HD Radio)
- Branding: La Ley 107.9

Programming
- Format: Regional Mexican
- Subchannels: HD2: Regional Mexican "La Privada"; HD3: Simulcast of WSKQ-FM

Ownership
- Owner: Spanish Broadcasting System; (WLEY Licensing, Inc.)

History
- First air date: 1965 (as WMRO-FM)
- Former call signs: WMRO-FM (1965–1969); WAUR (1969–1988); WYSY-FM (1988–1997)
- Call sign meaning: "la ley" (Spanish word for "the law")

Technical information
- Licensing authority: FCC
- Facility ID: 71282
- Class: B
- ERP: 21,000 watts
- HAAT: 232 meters (761 ft)
- Transmitter coordinates: 41°56′3.1″N 88°4′22.2″W
- Repeater: See § Boosters

Links
- Public license information: Public file; LMS
- Webcast: Listen live
- Website: laley1079.lamusica.com

WLEY-FM (107.9 MHz) is a radio station licensed to Aurora, Illinois, serving Aurora, Chicago, Naperville, Joliet and much of surrounding Northeast Illinois. Owned by Spanish Broadcasting System, it broadcasts a regional Mexican format branded as La Ley 107.9. WLEY's studios are located in the Crain Communications Building in the Loop, while its transmitter is located in Bloomingdale, with its antenna located atop WSCR's tower.

== History ==
=== WMRO-FM ===
The station was first licensed in 1965, and held the call sign WMRO-FM. It was the FM sister station to AM 1280 WMRO. Its transmitter was located atop Aurora's Leland Tower, and it had an ERP of 3,600 watts. The station broadcast a beautiful music format. WMRO-FM was owned by Vincent Cofey and Benjamin Oswalt. In 1967, Vincent Cofey purchased controlling interest in the station for $35,000.

=== WAUR ===
In 1969, the station's call sign was changed to WAUR and its ERP was increased to 31,200 watts. In 1973, it was sold to Stevens Communications for $343,000. In 1975, WAUR's transmitter was moved to the eastern fringes of Aurora, and its ERP was increased to 50,000 watts at a HAAT of 488 feet. In the late 1970s, the station aired an adult contemporary format, playing music from the 1960s and 1970s. In the 1980s, WAUR was branded "Gold Rock", playing oldies of the 1950s, 1960s, and 1970s, along with some currents. In 1986, the station was sold to Midwest Broadcasting for $4 million. The following year, WAUR and WMRO were sold to Beasley Broadcast Group for $8.7 million. Beasley Broadcast Group had been a minority owner of Midwest Broadcasting.

=== WYSY-FM ===
In March 1988, the station's call letters were changed to WYSY-FM. WYSY-FM aired an adult contemporary format and was branded "Y-108" with the slogan "Doin' It In The 'Burbs!". In December 1989, its AM sister station WMRO became WYSY, simulcasting Y-108. In September 1992, the station's transmitter was moved to Bloomingdale, Illinois. For a while in 1993, the station played hot AC days and hard rock/metal at night.

In late 1993, WYSY-FM was sold to Cox Communications for $9 million. In January 1994, the station switched to a classic hits format featuring rock, pop, R&B, and disco hits of the 1970s, with the slogan "The Greatest Hits of the '70s". The station was briefly branded "Star 107.9", but later changed its branding to "Y107.9" because WZSR had registered the "Star" moniker with the state.

In 1996, WYSY-FM and 105.9 WCKG were acquired by Infinity Broadcasting as part of a station swap. At the end of the year, Infinity Broadcasting was purchased by the parent company of CBS. This caused CBS/Infinity to exceed the FCC's ownership limits, requiring the sale of two stations. CBS/Infinity decided to sell WYSY-FM and WSCR AM 820. In 1997, WYSY was sold to Spanish Broadcasting System for $33 million. On April 14, 1997, at 6 p.m., after playing "Last Dance" by Donna Summer and "Last Song" by Edward Bear, WYSY-FM dropped its 1970s hits format and began stunting with a 4-to-5 hour loop of songs primarily from the adult contemporary format (the first song on the loop being "Everyday Is A Winding Road" by Sheryl Crow). The format was helmed in a way that served as essentially a predecessor to the future adult hits format, as it was "deejayed" by a voice deemed only as "Bill", who claimed he borrowed a number of CDs and records and was playing "some of [his] favorite songs."

=== WLEY-FM ===
On July 4, 1997, after almost 3 months of stunting, WYSY adopted a regional Mexican format branded "La Ley". Its call sign was changed to WLEY-FM later that month. By coincidence, WLEY's calls originated on WCFS-FM (105.9) in the 1950s, standing for Leyden Township.

On August 21, 2018, WLEY-FM HD2 began broadcasting 95.1 Clubsteppin', an Urban oldies format focused on Chicago stepping. The format was programmed by Lamont Watts. Clubsteppin was simulcast on 95.1 FM by the translators W236CF in Chicago and W236CG in Bolingbrook, which formerly aired a rock format as "The Hound". WLEY-FM HD2 was also simulcast on 103.9 W280EM until May 2020. W280EM's owner, Windy City Broadcasting, was fined $8,000 in March 2022, following an informal objection filed by Albert David, as its owner had never informed the FCC that the translator had switched from rebroadcasting WTMX HD2 to WLEY-FM HD2 or of it being taken silent in May 2020.

== Boosters ==
Call sign	Frequency	City of license	FID	ERP (W)	Transmitter coordinates	FCC info
WLEY-FM2	107.9 FM	Cicero, Illinois	199002	99	41°51′19.1″N 87°45′32.2″W	LMS
WLEY-FM3	107.9 FM	Chicago, Illinois	199003	99	41°52′8.7″N 87°41′35.8″W	LMS
WLEY-FM4	107.9 FM	Chicago, Illinois	199004	99	41°50′32.1″N 87°40′33″W	LMS
