= Signal Hill, California =

City in California, United States

- City
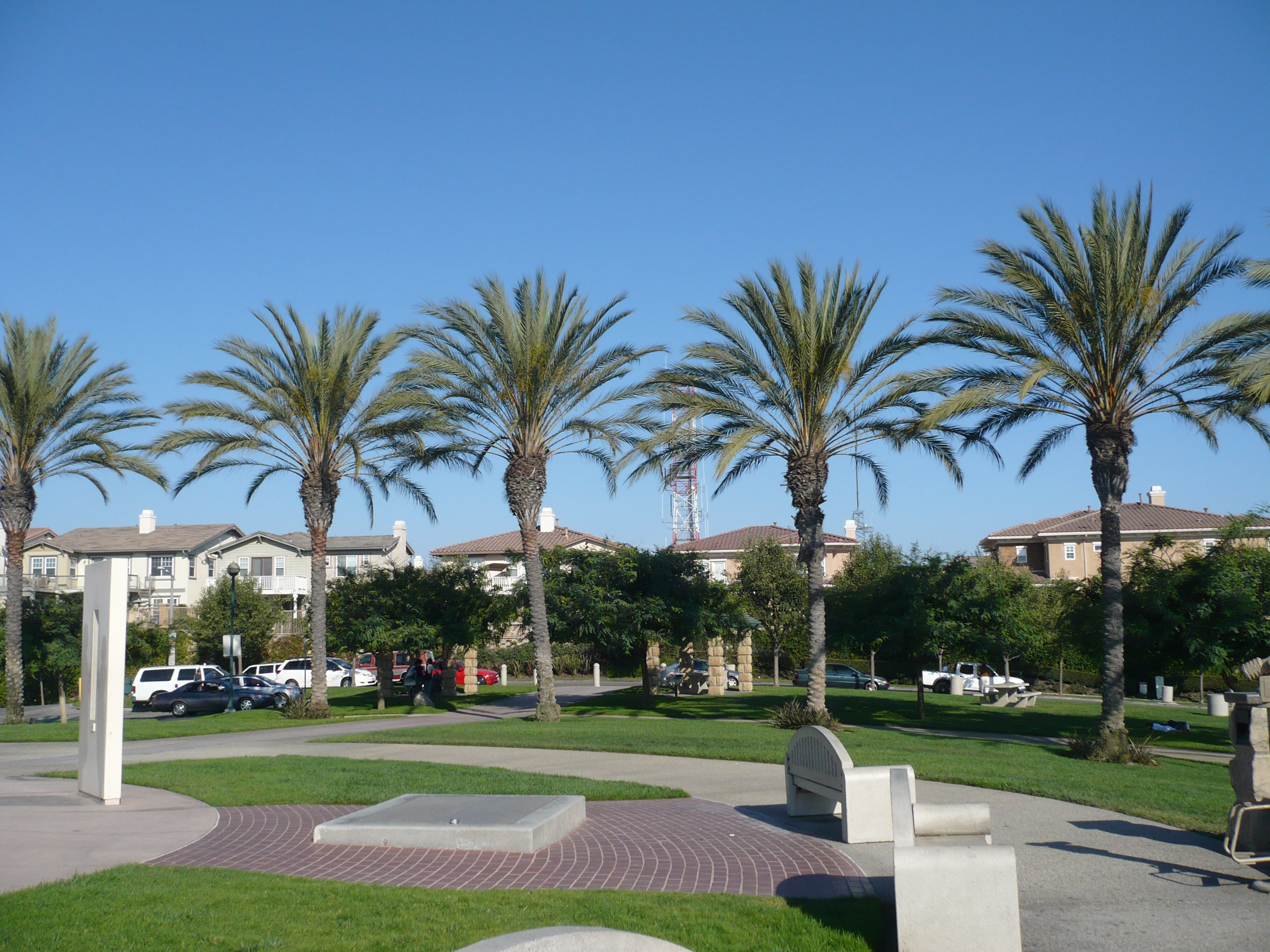
- Downtown Signal Hill in October 2008

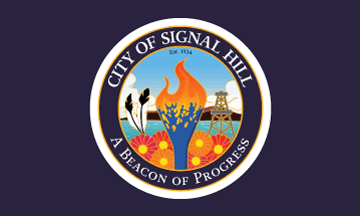
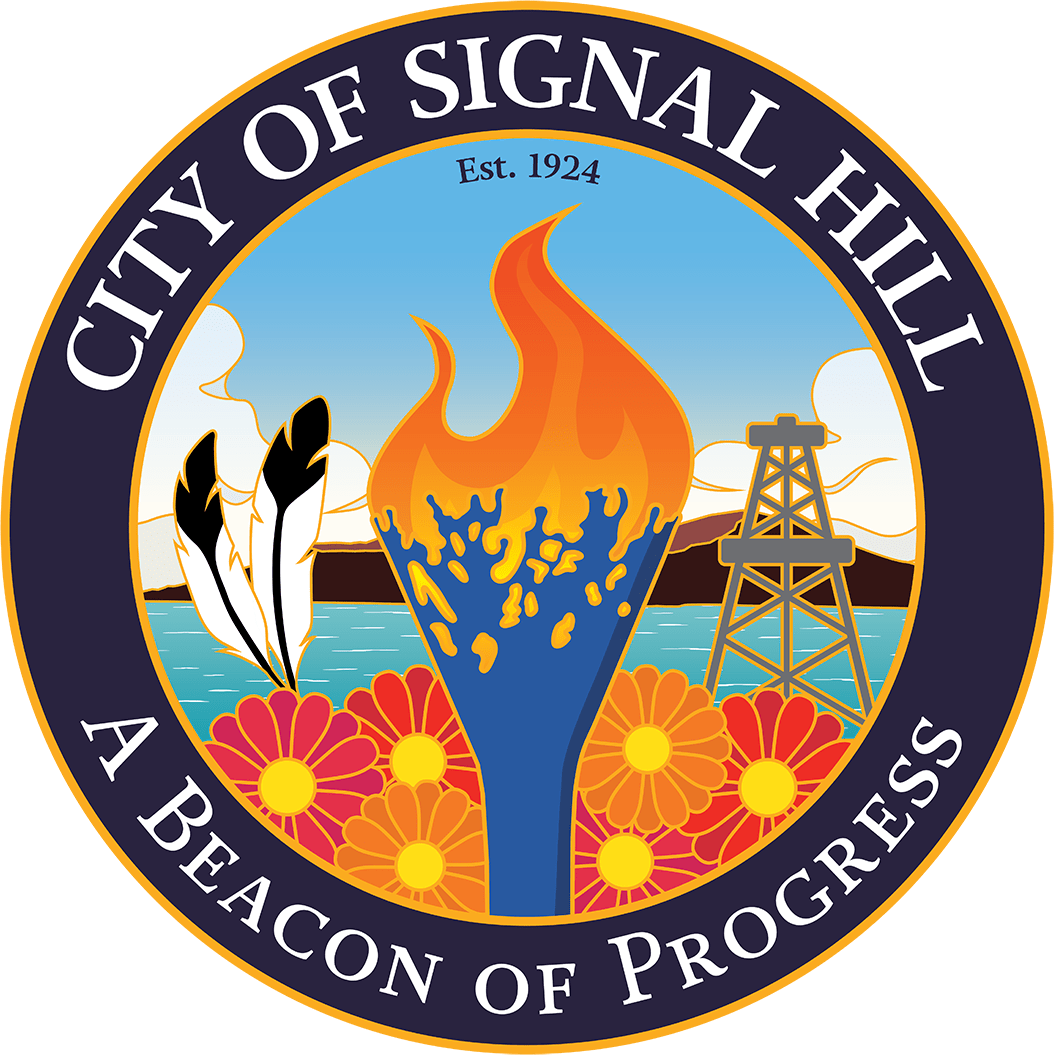
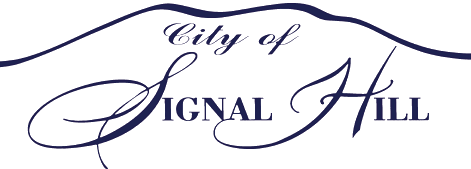
- Flag Seal Logo
- Motto: "A beacon of progress!"
- Interactive map of Signal Hill, California
- Location in the contiguous United States
- Coordinates: 33.79935°N 118.16558°W
- Country: United States
- State: California
- County: Los Angeles
- Incorporated: April 22, 1924

Government
  - Mayor: Keir Jones
  - Mayor Pro Tem: Tina L. Hansen
  - City council: Councilmember Robert D. Copeland; Councilmember Charlie Honeycutt; Councilmember Lori Y. Woods

Area
  - Total: 2.19 sq mi (5.67 km^{2})
  - Land: 2.19 sq mi (5.67 km^{2})
  - Water: 0 sq mi (0.00 km^{2}) 0.08%
- Elevation: 148 ft (45 m)

Population (2020)
  - Total: 11,848
  - Density: 5,217.6/sq mi (2,014.52/km^{2})
- Time zone: UTC-8 (Pacific Time Zone)
  - Summer (DST): UTC-7 (PDT)
- ZIP code: 90755
- Area code: 562
- FIPS code: 06-71876
- GNIS feature IDs: 1661443, 2411899
- Website: www.cityofsignalhill.org

Signal Hill is a city 2.2 mi^{2} (5.7 km^{2}) in area in Los Angeles County, California, United States. Partially high on an eponymous hill, the city is an enclave completely surrounded by the city of Long Beach. Signal Hill was incorporated on April 22, 1924, roughly three years after oil was discovered there. As of the 2020 census, the population was 11,848, up from 11,016 at the 2010 census.

== Etymology ==
Signal Hill was originally known as Los Cerritos ("The Little Hills") but got its current name when it became the signal point of the United States Coast and Geodetic Survey in 1889.

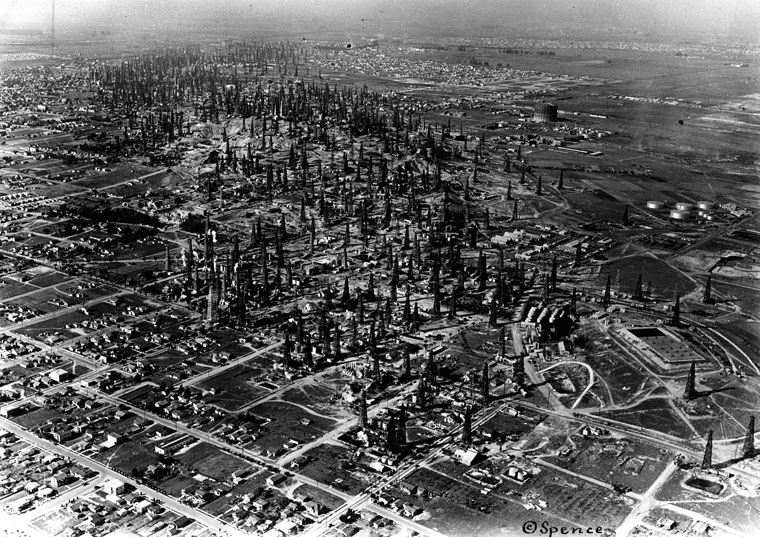
Aerial view of Signal Hill oilfield in 1930

== History ==
The hill that the city is named after is 365 feet (111 m) above the surrounding city of Long Beach. Because of this height, it was used by the local Tongva Indians for signal fires that could be seen throughout the surrounding area and even out to Catalina Island, 26 miles (42 km) away.

After the Spanish claimed Alta California ("Upper California," or what is now the state of California), Signal Hill eventually became part of the first large rancho grant to be allotted under Spanish rule in Alta California. The Rancho San Pedro (Dominguez Rancho) land grant exceeded 74,000 acres (300 km^{2}) as granted to a soldier, Juan Jose Dominguez, who accompanied Junipero Serra, by Governor Fages through authority of King Carlos III of Spain in 1784.

Between 1913 and 1923 an early California movie studio, Balboa Amusement Producing Company (also known as Balboa Studios), was located in Long Beach and used 11 acres (45,000 m^{2}) on Signal Hill for outdoor locations. Buster Keaton and Fatty Arbuckle were two of the Balboa Studios actors who had films shot on Signal Hill.

Before oil was discovered in Signal Hill, there were large homes built on the hill itself, and in the lower elevations there were agricultural fields where fruits, vegetables, and flowers were grown.

=== Discovery of oil ===
Signal Hill changed forever when oil was discovered. The hill would soon become part of the Long Beach Oil Field, one of the most productive oil fields in the world. On June 23, 1921, Royal Dutch Shell's Alamitos #1 well erupted. The gas pressure was so great the gusher rose 114 ft (35 m) in the air. Soon Signal Hill was covered with over 100 oil derricks, and because of its prickly appearance at a distance became known as "Porcupine Hill". Today, many of the original oil wells and pumpjacks are gone, although Signal Hill is still a productive oil field and several wells and derricks remain. Signal Hill is now a mix of residential and commercial areas.

The city was incorporated on April 22, 1924. Among the reasons for incorporation was avoiding annexation by Long Beach with its zoning restrictions and per-barrel oil tax. Proving to be a progressive city, Signal Hill elected Mrs. Jessie Nelson as its first mayor, the first female mayor in the state of California.

== Gallery ==
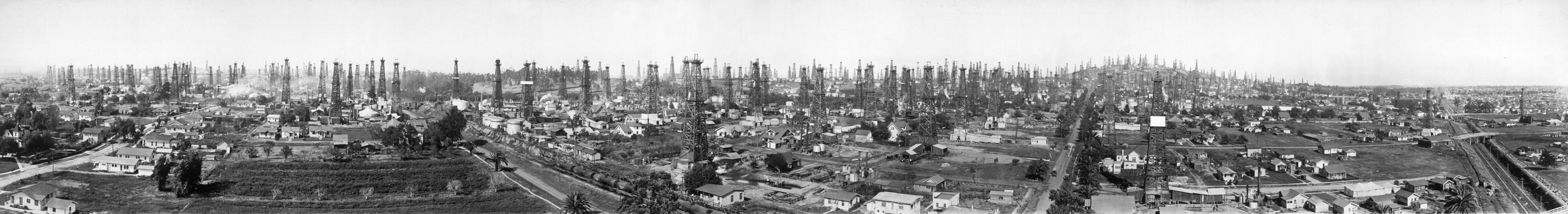
Signal Hill c. 1923
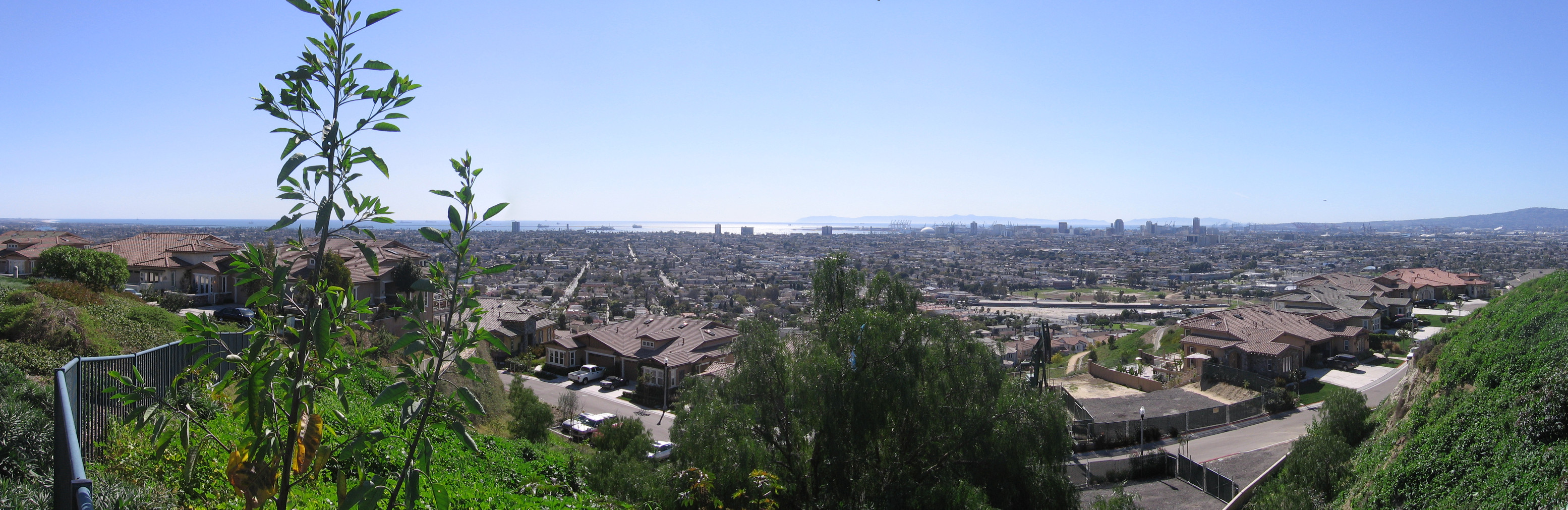
View of Long Beach from Skyline Drive on Signal Hill.

== Government ==
Signal Hill has a council-manager form of government. The city council has five members who are elected to four-year, staggered terms; council members elect the mayor from among their ranks.

On the Los Angeles County Board of Supervisors, Signal Hill is represented by 4th District Supervisor Janice Hahn.

In the United States House of Representatives, Signal Hill is in California's 42nd congressional district, represented by Democrat Robert Garcia.

In the California State Legislature, Signal Hill is in the 33rd senatorial district, represented by Democrat Lena Gonzalez, and in the 69th Assembly district, represented by Democrat Josh Lowenthal.

== Emergency services ==
The Signal Hill Police Department provides local law enforcement. In 2018, it budgeted for 38 police officers to enforce the law in the 2 square mile municipality.

Basic life support and ambulance transport is provided by Care Ambulance Service

The Long Beach Memorial Medical Center provides medical services to the City and LACFD Station 60.

The Los Angeles County Department of Health Services operates the Whittier Health Center in Whittier, serving Signal Hill.

=== Fire ===
The Los Angeles County Fire Department provides fire protection services for the city of Signal Hill.

== Economy ==
Prior to its dissolution, the airline Jet America Airlines was headquartered in Signal Hill. The diner chain Hof's Hut is headquartered in Signal Hill.

=== Top employers ===
According to the city's 2017 Comprehensive Annual Financial Report, the top employers in the city are:

#	Employer	# of Employees
1	Office Depot	428
2	The Home Depot	343
3	Costco	301
4	Target	265
5	Edge Systems LLC	191
6	Warren Distributing	163
7	Long Beach BMW Auto	143
8	Accountable Healthcare IPA	136
9	Allied Refrigeration	130
10	Mercedes-Benz of Long Beach	127

== Education ==
=== Primary and secondary school ===
==== Public schools ====
Signal Hill is served by Long Beach Unified School District.

There are two operating elementary schools within the city limits: Signal Hill Elementary School and Juan Bautista Alvarado Elementary School. The former Burroughs Elementary School and adjacent Teacher Resource Center now serves as office space for the Head Start Program. Juan Bautista Alvarado Elementary School is located on the site of the former all male boarding school, the Southern California Military Academy. There is one middle school within the city limits: Jessie Elwin Nelson Academy. High school students usually attend Long Beach Polytechnic High School (usually referred to as Long Beach Poly), although some students choose to attend Long Beach Wilson Classical High School. Signal Hill Elementary School has earned the California Achieving Schools Award, and the National Achieving Schools Award. Signal Hill and Alvarado are both California Distinguished Schools.

=== Colleges and universities ===
Community college students attend one of the two nearby campuses for Long Beach City College.

California State University, Long Beach and DeVry University are located less than five miles (8.0 km) away.

American University of Health Sciences (AUHS) is located within the city of Signal Hill. The university offers an education in Allied Healthcare, offering degrees such as a Bachelor and Master of Science in Nursing (BSN; MSN), Master of Science in Clinical Research (MSCR), Bachelor of Science in Pharmaceutical Science (BSPS), and a Doctorate of Pharmacy (PharmD) program.

== City parks ==
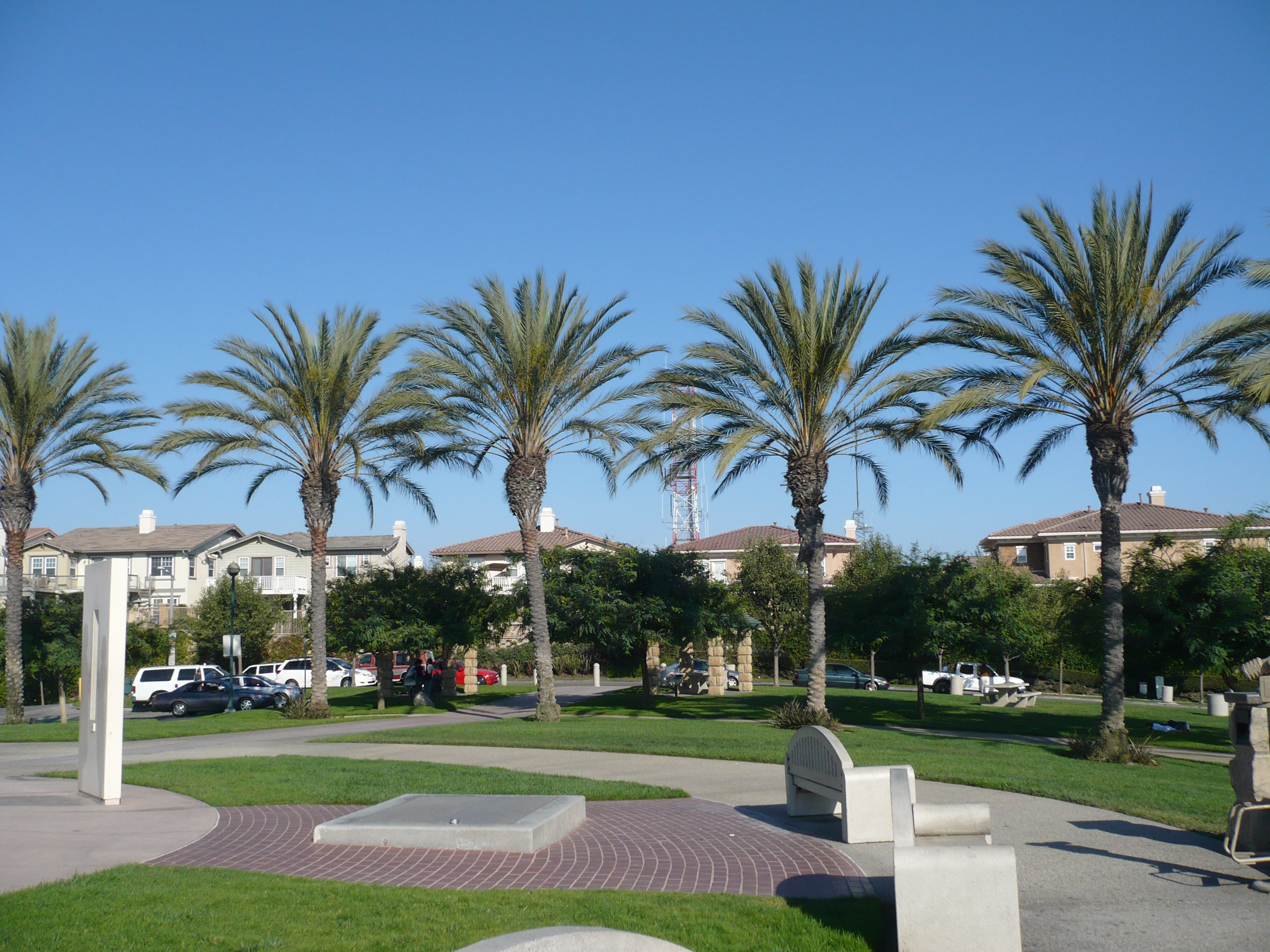
Hilltop Park

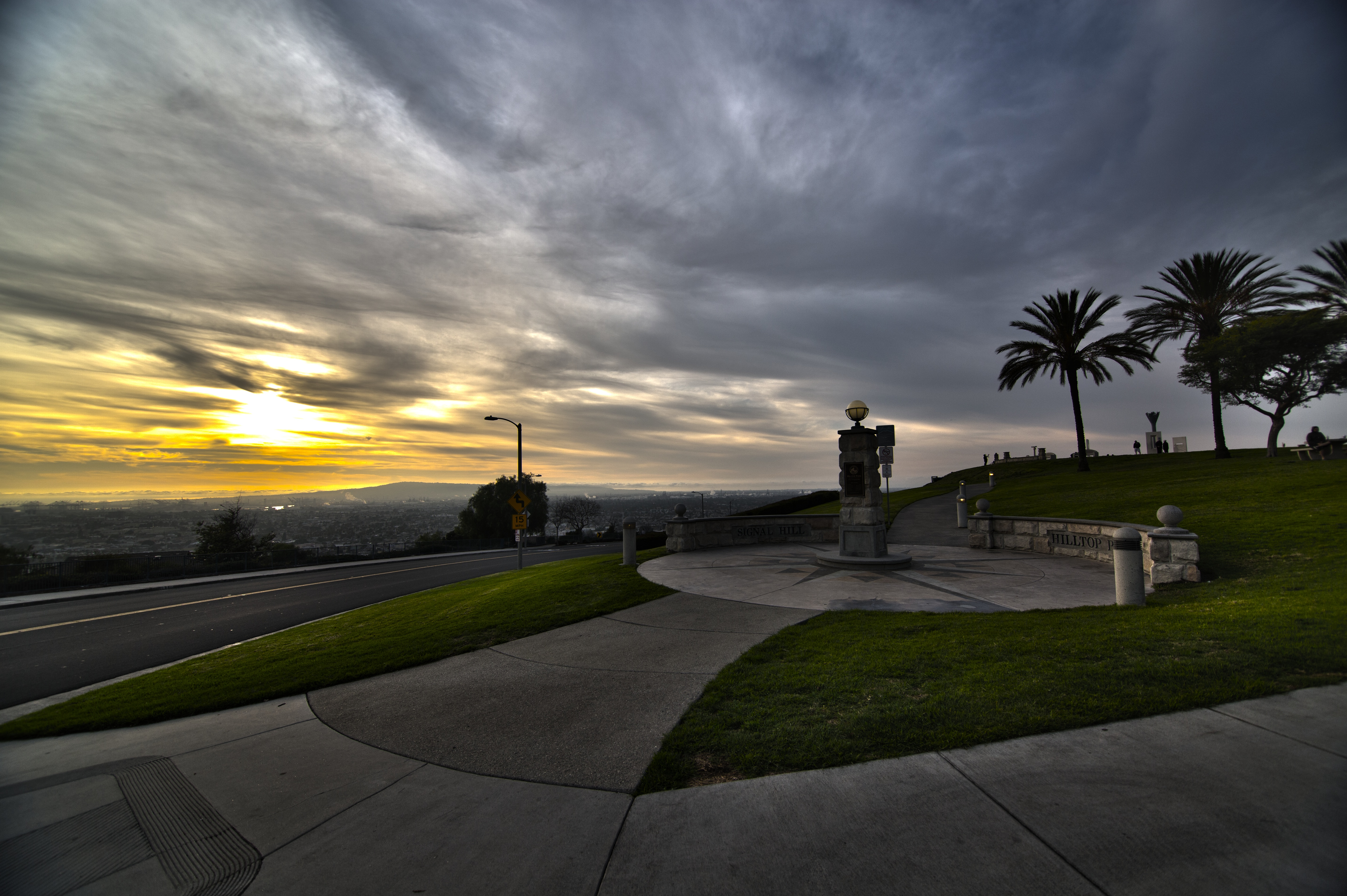
Sun setting over Long Beach from Signal Hill Hilltop Park.

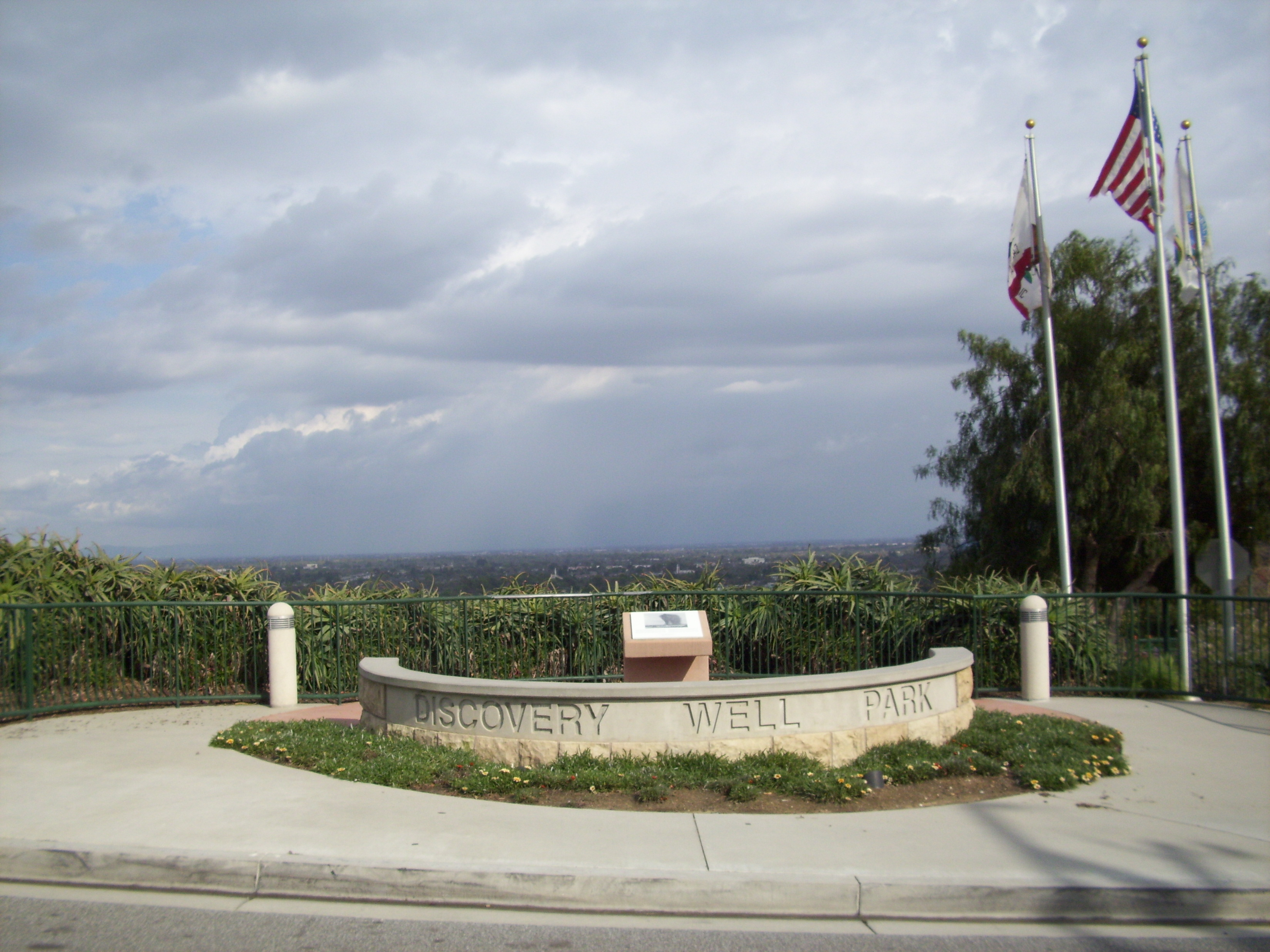
Discovery Well Park, California Historical Landmark 580 - Alamitos #1, 1921

Although a small town, Signal Hill has several parks. The largest is Signal Hill Park at 10 acres (40,000 m^{2}). It is adjacent to City Hall, the Community Center and the Library. The park has picnic tables, a playground, basketball courts, a softball field, and restrooms. There is also an amphitheater where there are weekly outdoor concerts during the summer.

Hilltop Park 3.2 acres (13,000 m^{2}) is at the top of Signal Hill and is very popular for its scenic views. There are several telescopes in the park. There is also some public artwork in the park and a mist tower. This park is a popular location for geocaching. On a clear day you can see as far as the Santa Monica Mountains, Downtown Los Angeles, the San Gabriel Mountains, and Santa Catalina Island.

Reservoir Park 2.8 acres (11,000 m^{2}) near the California Heights neighborhood of Long Beach is a large grassy area with picnic tables next to a 4.7 million gallon water reservoir.

Discovery Well Park 4.9 acres (20,000 m^{2}), 1.8 acres (7,300 m^{2}) flat is near the original well on Signal Hill.

There are also six pocket parks of roughly 0.5 acres (2,000 m^{2}) or less, including Calbrisas Park, Hillbrook Park, Panorama Promenade, Raymond Arbor Park, Sunset View Park, and Temple View Park.

Near the Panorama Promenade, there is the Unity Sculpture, a 12' height sculpture atop a 4' pedestal with a seating courtyard that is dedicated in memory of the victims of September 11.

There are also several pedestrian-only trails that travel between various parks and roadways. Hiking along these trails, as well as on the sidewalks in Signal Hill is very popular. Some sections can be found that are between a 15% and 25% grade.

=== Proposed nature preserve ===
On the north slope of Signal Hill is a large area that is currently used for oil operations. This area has been proposed as a nature preserve.

== Geography ==
According to the United States Census Bureau, the city has a total area of 2.2 square miles (5.7 km^{2}), virtually all land. The city is surrounded on all sides by the city of Long Beach.

Signal Hill is served by the 562 area code. The city once shared three different postal ZIP codes with the city of Long Beach but in July 2002, the city of Signal Hill received its own ZIP code, 90755.

=== Climate ===
According to the Köppen Climate Classification system, Signal Hill has a semi-arid climate, abbreviated "BSk" on climate maps.

== Demographics ==
Historical population
Census	Pop.	Note	%±
1930	2,932		—
1940	3,184		8.6%
1950	4,040		26.9%
1960	4,627		14.5%
1970	5,588		20.8%
1980	5,734		2.6%
1990	8,371		46.0%
2000	9,333		11.5%
2010	11,016		18.0%
2020	11,848		7.6%
U.S. Decennial Census; 1860–1870 1880-1890; 1900 1910 1920; 1930 1940 1950; 1960 1970 1980; 1990 2000 2010; 2020

=== Racial and ethnic composition ===
Signal Hill city, California – Racial and ethnic composition Note: the US Census treats Hispanic/Latino as an ethnic category. This table excludes Latinos from the racial categories and assigns them to a separate category. Hispanics/Latinos may be of any race.
Race / Ethnicity (NH = Non-Hispanic)	Pop 1980	Pop 1990	Pop 2000	Pop 2010	Pop 2020	% 1980	% 1990	% 2000	% 2010	% 2020
White alone (NH)	3,955	4,711	3,340	3,340	2,831	73.60%	56.28%	35.79%	30.32%	23.89%
Black or African American alone (NH)	692	865	1,167	1,427	1,550	12.88%	10.33%	12.50%	12.95%	13.08%
Native American or Alaska Native alone (NH)	62	60	23	27	33	1.15%	0.72%	0.25%	0.25%	0.28%
Asian alone (NH)	261	897	1,515	2,211	2,586	4.86%	10.72%	16.23%	20.07%	21.83%
Native Hawaiian or Pacific Islander alone (NH)	261	897	186	112	80	4.86%	10.72%	1.99%	1.02%	0.68%
Other race alone (NH)	38	16	31	36	48	0.71%	0.19%	0.33%	0.33%	0.41%
Mixed race or Multiracial (NH)	x	x	364	391	512	x	x	3.90%	3.55%	4.32%
Hispanic or Latino (any race)	726	1,822	2,707	3,472	4,208	13.51%	21.77%	29.00%	31.52%	35.52%
Total	5,734	8,371	9,333	11,016	11,848	100.00%	100.00%	100.00%	100.00%	100.00%

=== 2020 census ===
As of the 2020 census, Signal Hill had a population of 11,848 and a population density of 5,412.5 inhabitants per square mile (2,089.8/km^{2}).

The age distribution was 20.3% under the age of 18, 8.1% aged 18 to 24, 31.6% aged 25 to 44, 27.1% aged 45 to 64, and 13.0% aged 65 or older. The median age was 38.3 years. For every 100 females, there were 96.0 males, and for every 100 females age 18 and over there were 94.0 males.

The census reported that 98.9% of the population lived in households, 0.6% lived in non-institutionalized group quarters, and 0.5% were institutionalized. 100.0% of residents lived in urban areas, while 0.0% lived in rural areas.

There were 4,561 households, of which 31.8% had children under the age of 18 living in them. Of all households, 38.2% were married-couple households, 9.4% were cohabiting couple households, 20.6% were households with a male householder and no spouse or partner present, and 31.7% were households with a female householder and no spouse or partner present. About 26.5% of households were made up of individuals and 8.0% had someone living alone who was 65 years of age or older. The average household size was 2.57. There were 2,910 families (63.8% of all households).

There were 4,749 housing units at an average density of 2,169.5 units per square mile (837.6 units/km^{2}), of which 4,561 (96.0%) were occupied. The homeowner vacancy rate was 0.8% and the rental vacancy rate was 2.8%. Of occupied units, 51.7% were owner-occupied and 48.3% were occupied by renters.

=== 2023 estimate ===
In 2023, the US Census Bureau estimated that the median household income was $102,303, and the per capita income was $52,980. About 8.0% of families and 9.1% of the population were below the poverty line.

=== 2010 census ===
The 2010 United States census reported that Signal Hill had a population of 11,016. The population density was 5,029.0 inhabitants per square mile (1,941.7/km^{2}). The racial makeup of Signal Hill was 4,650 (42.2%) White (30.3% Non-Hispanic White), 1,502 (13.6%) African American, 83 (0.8%) Native American, 2,245 (20.4%) Asian, 135 (1.2%) Pacific Islander, 1,778 (16.1%) from other races, and 623 (5.7%) from two or more races. Hispanic or Latino of any race were 3,472 persons (31.5%).

The Census reported that 10,970 people (99.6% of the population) lived in households, 2 (0%) lived in non-institutionalized group quarters, and 44 (0.4%) were institutionalized.

There were 4,157 households, out of which 1,419 (34.1%) had children under the age of 18 living in them, 1,580 (38.0%) were opposite-sex married couples living together, 660 (15.9%) had a female householder with no husband present, 258 (6.2%) had a male householder with no wife present. There were 302 (7.3%) unmarried opposite-sex partnerships, and 156 (3.8%) same-sex married couples or partnerships. 1,128 households (27.1%) were made up of individuals, and 245 (5.9%) had someone living alone who was 65 years of age or older. The average household size was 2.64. There were 2,498 families (60.1% of all households); the average family size was 3.33.

The population was spread out, with 2,624 people (23.8%) under the age of 18, 1,034 people (9.4%) aged 18 to 24, 3,476 people (31.6%) aged 25 to 44, 2,970 people (27.0%) aged 45 to 64, and 912 people (8.3%) who were 65 years of age or older. The median age was 36.0 years. For every 100 females, there were 97.3 males. For every 100 females age 18 and over, there were 94.9 males.

There were 4,389 housing units at an average density of 2,003.7 per square mile (773.6/km^{2}), of which 2,141 (51.5%) were owner-occupied, and 2,016 (48.5%) were occupied by renters. The homeowner vacancy rate was 1.9%; the rental vacancy rate was 5.7%. 5,253 people (47.7% of the population) lived in owner-occupied housing units and 5,717 people (51.9%) lived in rental housing units.

According to the 2010 United States census, Signal Hill had a median household income of $70,442, with 14.1% of the population living below the federal poverty line.

=== Mapping L.A. ===
Mexican (20.9%) and Cambodian (8.4%) were the most common ancestries. Mexico (28.5%) and Cambodia (19.9%) were the most common foreign places of birth.

== See also ==
- Long Beach Oil Field has more details on the giant oilfield that includes Signal Hill
- Long Beach Municipal Cemetery
- Signal Hill (disambiguation) for other Signal Hills
