= WRXD =

Radio station in Fajardo, Puerto Rico

- Fajardo, Puerto Rico; Puerto Rico
- Broadcast area: San Juan, Puerto Rico
- Frequency: 96.5 MHz
- Branding: Estereotempo

Programming
- Format: Adult Contemporary

Ownership
- Owner: Spanish Broadcasting System; (WRXD Licensing, Inc.)
- Sister stations: WZNT, WZMT, WIOB, WODA, WNOD, WMEG, WEGM

History
- First air date: 1969; 57 years ago
- Former call signs: WMDD-FM (1969–1976); WDOY (1976–1999); WCMA-FM (1999–2008)

Technical information
- Licensing authority: FCC
- Facility ID: 162219
- Class: B
- ERP: 50,000 watts
- HAAT: 855.0 meters (2,805.1 ft)
- Transmitter coordinates: 18°55′20″N 66°27′22″W
- Translator: 94.5 W233CW (Mayagüez-Yauco)
- Repeaters: (97.5-2) WIOB-HD2 (Mayagüez); 1040 WZNA (Moca)

Links
- Public license information: Public file; LMS
- Website: estereotempo.lamusica.com

WRXD (96.5 FM), branded on-air as Estereotempo, is a radio station broadcasting an adult contemporary format. Licensed to Fajardo, Puerto Rico, it serves the Puerto Rico area. The station is currently owned by WRXD Licensing, Inc., a division of the Spanish Broadcasting System.

== History ==
In 1969, the station was known as Radio Conquistador, with the call sign, WMDD-FM. From the late 1970s until the late 1990s it was known as Y-96 FM with its original call signs WDOY. Then in the late 1990s it was branded as Cima 96.5 FM, later Romance 96.5 FM (WCMA-FM) and its format was a 1980s and 1990s pop music station until February 2008. On February 25, 2008, at 5:30 a.m. AST it became the first FM Spanish-speaking station in United States and Latin America to be a news station and political analysis on a 24/7 schedule. It was branded as Red 96.

Red 96 was originally supposed to be called “Metro 96” according to abandoned SBS trademarks.

It was announced on January 15, 2010, that it would go off the air and turned into a music station, playing merengue and bachata. The new name is Ritmo 96.5 FM.

On October 14, 2014, Estereotempo changed frequencies from 99.9 to 96.5 FM, which gave it better coverage in the metropolitan area.

On February 1, 2018, Estereotempo announced that WIOB (97.5 FM) in Mayagüez would leave the network, and become a repeater of the Zeta 93 Salsa Network. The next day, WRXD became the sole station of the Estereotempo network. On June 11, 2018, WRXD changed its Estereotempo branding after 41 years to La 96.5 or simply 96.5. On July 28, 2018, WRXD switched to a Top 40 format and launched Play 96.5. On June 17, 2019, WRXD returned to a Spanish AC format, after one year with Top 40/CHR and now features a mix of Bachata, Pop, Merengue and Salsa.

On November 4, 2022 WRXD began stunting with Christmas music, branded as "Navidad 96.5".

On December 9, 2022, WRXD announces that the Estereotempo moniker and its Spanish AC will return after four years of absence. On January 23, 2023 at 8 a.m. AST, WRXD officially relaunched "Estereotempo" with “La Incondicional” by Luis Miguel being the first song played.

On May 22, 2023, Estereotempo launched four new radio shows.

On September 26, 2024, WRXD changed its Adult contemporary format to Top 40/CHR, while maintaining the Estereotempo moniker on air.

== Logos ==
WRXD old logo when it was WCMA-FM and branded as 1980s' pop music station "Cima 96".

WRXD old logo when it was news and talk station "Red 96 FM".

WRXD old logo when it was Spanish tropical station "Ritmo 96.5".

WRXD old logo when it was branded as Top 40/Spanish AC station "Play 96".
