= Rancho Estates, Long Beach, California =

Mid-20th century houses by Cliff May

Rancho Estates
- Neighborhood of Long Beach
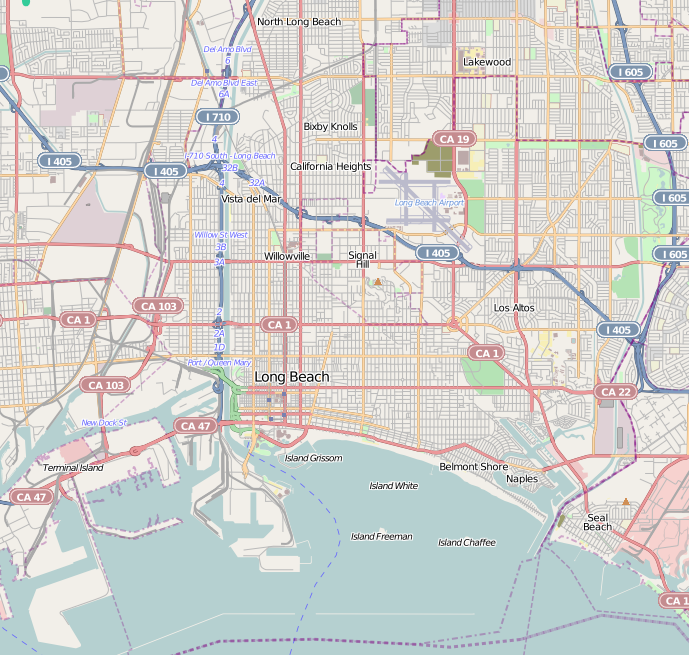
- Location within Long Beach, California Location within the Los Angeles metropolitan area Location within southern California Location within California Location within the United States
- Coordinates: 33.815°N 118.096°W
- Country: United States
- State: California
- County: Los Angeles
- City: Long Beach

Rancho Estates, also known as Lakewood Rancho Estates, in Long Beach, California, is a neighborhood of homes built between 1953 and 1954. Designed by architects Cliff May and Chris Choate, it was the largest tract designed by May, who became well known for his California ranch style houses. The neighborhood of three- and four-bedroom houses was built by developer Ross Cortese, who also developed nearby Rossmoor and Leisure World. There are 700 homes in the neighborhood.

== Architectural features ==
The L-shaped houses designed by Cliff May combine a rustic rancho design with modern use of floor-to-ceiling glass, and feature the patio as an integral part of the home. They were built using pre-fabricated panels developed by Choate. Low-pitched gabled roofs with wide overhangs helped to keep the homes cool during the summer.

Original features of the homes included:

- Western Holly gas range
- Day & Night 70,000 BTU forced air heater
- Birch kitchen cabinets
- Formica counter tops and sinks
- Exposed beam ceiling
- Birch paneling
- Redwood exterior

== Popularity ==
The ranch homes in Lakewood Rancho Estates originally cost $7,500 to build and sold for around $11,000. The 700 homes sold out within two years, leading Cortese and the team to build more two similar tracts in Anaheim.

In 2021, a Cliff May house in Rancho Estates sold for $1.95 million.

== See also ==
- Neighborhoods of Long Beach, California
