= Eyassu Worku =

American basketball player

No. 24 – Paderborn Baskets
- Position: Guard
- League: ProA

Personal information
- Born: 18 October 1998 (age 28) Los Alamitos, California, United States
- Listed height: 1.88 m (6 ft 2 in)
- Listed weight: 174 lb (79 kg)

Career information
- High school: Los Alamitos High School
- College: UC Irvine (2016–2020)
- Playing career: 2020–present

Career history
- 2020: Zadar
- 2021: Zabok
- 2021–2022: Gostivar
- 2023–2024: MZT Skopje
- 2024–2025: Dubrovnik
- 2025–present: Paderborn Baskets

Career highlights
- Macedonian Cup winner (2024)

Eyassu Worku (Amharic: እያሱ ወርቁ; born 18 October 1998) is an American basketball player for Paderborn Baskets of the German ProA. He has an Ethiopian descent.

== Early and personal life ==
Eyassu Worku was born in the United States to Ethiopian immigrants Shibeshi and Yodit Berhanu.

Worku originally played more soccer than basketball. He completely switched to basketball in high school.

Worku's former fellow UC Irvine wingman Evan Leonard is a childhood friend. Just like Worku, Leonard went on to play professionally in North Macedonia.

== High school and college career ==
Worku left Los Alamitos High School as its all-time leading scorer. In 2017, he led his team to an undefeated Sunset League championship.

Worku played 119 games for the Los Alamitos Griffins over four years and piled up 1,777 points, good enough for highest career total in school history, breaking Landry Fields’ record. Worku shot 44 percent from the field and 78 percent from the free-throw line.

He played for the 2018–19 UC Irvine Anteaters team under head coach Russell Turner. As starter at point guard, he helped his team win the 2019 Big West Conference tournament.
