= LAUSD (disambiguation) =

LAUSD may refer to:

- Los Angeles Unified School District, in Los Angeles County, California
- Los Alamitos Unified School District, in Orange County, California
- The song "LAUSD" by American alternative hip hop group Jurassic 5, in the 2000 album Quality Control
