= Leisure World, Seal Beach, California =

Retirement community

Coordinates: 33°46′3.85″N 118°4′40.10″W

Leisure World Seal Beach is an active-seniors’ retirement community opened in 1962 that introduced many innovations characterizing later senior property developments. When built, it was the nation's first mass-marketed housing project, first gated senior community, first all-electric community, and the first to have a health insurance plan and access to an on-site medical center included in its residents’ monthly payments. At its opening, it was the world's largest housing development for seniors, the United States’ largest cooperative housing development, and the prototype for six other Leisure World communities across the United States built by the Rossmoor Corp, co-founded by developers Ross W. Cortese and his wife, Alona Marlowe Cortese. It is located in Seal Beach, which fronts the Pacific Ocean in Orange County, California. Leisure World houses approximately 9,600 residents in 6,608 one- and two-bedroom apartments and condominiums.

== History ==
While both were taking evening real estate classes at Hollywood High School, Ross W. Cortese, a Depression-era high-school dropout, and a part-time contractor flipping homes in Compton, met former Metro-Goldwyn-Mayer contract actress Alona Marlowe (née Ilona L. Goetten). They married in 1948, and capitalizing on her real estate license, organized a corporation under the name Alona Rey Homes, Inc. After building a small development in Culver City, the couple began undertaking larger projects such as Frematic Homes in Anaheim.

Frematic Homes employed designer Cliff May’s innovative California Ranch residential concept “that let the outside in," integrating extensive prefabrication techniques, post-and-beam construction, slab floors, and floor-to-ceiling windows later incorporated into Leisure World. The Frematic development also showcased the Corteses’ emerging public relations sensibility, with Westinghouse spokesperson, Hollywood actress Betty Furness, appearing in newspaper photographs with Ross Cortese in one of Frematic's “Betty Furness Beautility Kitchens.”

The Corteses’ repeated successes led them, along with general contractor Murray Ward, to found Rossmoor Corp. in 1951. From 1955 through 1961, the company built the “Walled City of Rossmoor,” a comprehensive Orange County development the company envisioned would contain all the services of a town for its projected 10,000 residents. However, Ross Cortese's concept of a “comprehensive” development was thwarted when the hospital he wished to build for Rossmoor's population was repeatedly denied.

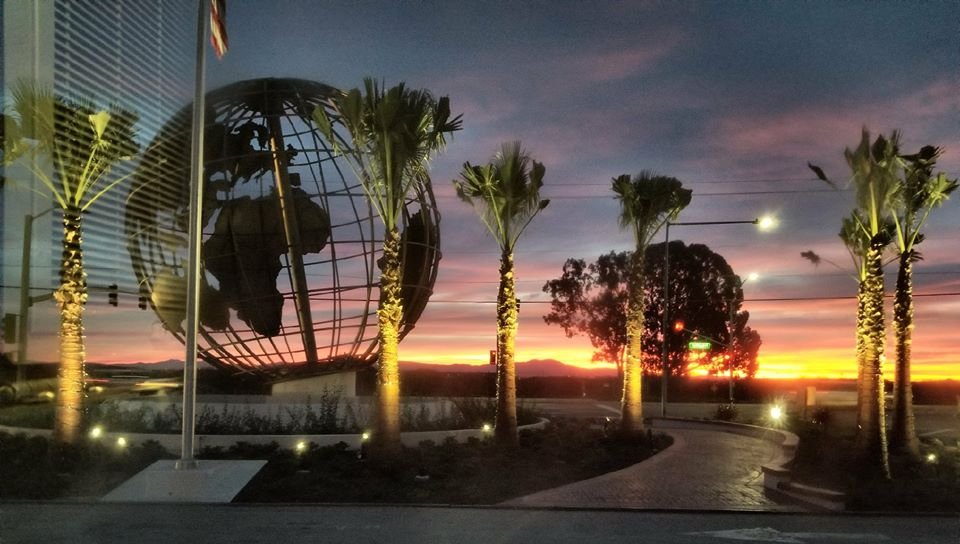
The 30-foot-tall globe at the Leisure World Seal Beach entrance

=== Interest in Aging ===
Nonetheless, the couple's study of medical services drew their attention to the health and housing needs of older adults, whose numbers were growing rapidly in the post-war period. The Corteses’ interest culminated in the couple's $4 million gift founding what became the University of Southern California’s gerontology school, now the world’s largest academic program researching older adults. Alona Cortese later endowed The Alona Cortese Elder Law Center at the Chapman University School of Law, which provides pro bono legal representation for seniors.

This interest influenced many of the Corteses’ future business enterprises. In 1961, upon finishing the Rossmoor housing development bordering Los Alamitos, California, Ross Cortese said the housing needs of seniors “have not been met even half-way thus far. None has answered the attendant economic, medical and sociological needs of the majority of our senior citizens.”

While Arizona’s Youngtown and Sun City senior living developments had already established the concept of dedicated retirement communities, the Corteses contemplated a new model for senior housing: a comprehensive cooperative development in which the residents owned not their residential unit, but a share of stock that permitted them to live in the community and own the rights to all the development’s common amenities. The community’s managers, not individual residents, would be responsible for their homes’ maintenance, painting and plumbing, appliances, and landscaping. It would be “not stuck out in the desert,” but near a city so residents could continue to enjoy a city's cultural opportunities and frequent visits from families and old friends. Emulating the company's “Walled City of Rossmoor” experience, the community would be the United States’ first and largest gate-controlled, walled retirement community. One of the most important amenities was a plan offering free on-site medical care and prescriptions as part of the monthly resident's fees, again a first in a U.S. retirement community.

=== Financing and Construction ===
Rossmoor Leisure World (as it was initially named) was to be built on a portion of the Hellman Ranch in what was then an un-incorporated square-mile plot in Orange County. Nearly adjacent to the walled Rossmoor development, the $150 million project ($1.4 billion in 2021 dollars) would be the United States’ largest cooperative housing development and its first all-electric community.

However, the project's scope and its “untried” cooperative ownership scheme generated skepticism among potential lenders. The Metropolitan Life Insurance Co. eventually agreed to finance the project, but stipulated the Federal Housing Administration (FHA) guarantee the loan.

FHA authorities agreed, but established “very strict regulations.” Rossmoor could provide the land and the plans, but “could have no part in building, sales or management.” Instead, the FHA required that separate nonprofit corporations share the project's ownership. One, the Leisure World Foundation, would supervise the project's construction and marketing.

When residents began to move in, there would be elections from among the residents to serve on the Golden Rain Foundation (GRF) as trustees for all the development's common facilities and to provide community-wide services such as recreation and security. Finally, as each of the parcels comprising the development were populated, the 6,470 planned residential units and the land on which they would be built would be controlled by “mutuals,” a third level of non-profit corporation collectively owned and managed by a board elected by residents of each of the development's parcels.

=== Promotion ===
Notwithstanding the awkward governing arrangement, construction of the Seal Beach Leisure World began in mid-1961. Interest rose quickly, propelled by a national marketing campaign that included a 1962 Life magazine advertisement claiming the development was “the most revolutionary new concept in housing since World War II.”

The Life advertisement was part of what is thought to be the first national mass-marketing campaign for a housing project. Hill and Knowlton, then the world's largest public relations firm, obtained widespread newspaper, radio and television coverage that by mid-1963 let the community claim residents from 43 states and 11 countries. The Corteses’ Los Angeles-based advertising firm, Brangham Brewer, spent so much money marketing the development that Leisure World's 1963 ad budget was announced in a free-standing Advertising Age magazine item.

Leisure World's prominence soon allowed the Corteses to assemble a Leisure World Foundation board headed by William G. Simon, the former head of the FBI’s Los Angeles field office and a founding director of The J. Edgar Hoover Foundation; and executive vice president Kenneth E. BeLieu, the former undersecretary of both the U.S. Navy and the U.S. Army. The other seven trustees included Los Angeles Dodgers owner Walter O’Malley; Hollywood producer Mervyn LeRoy; Paramount Pictures vice president Y. Frank Freeman; Sylvester Smith Jr., a past president of the American Bar Association; and former U.S. Rep. Allan O. Hunter.

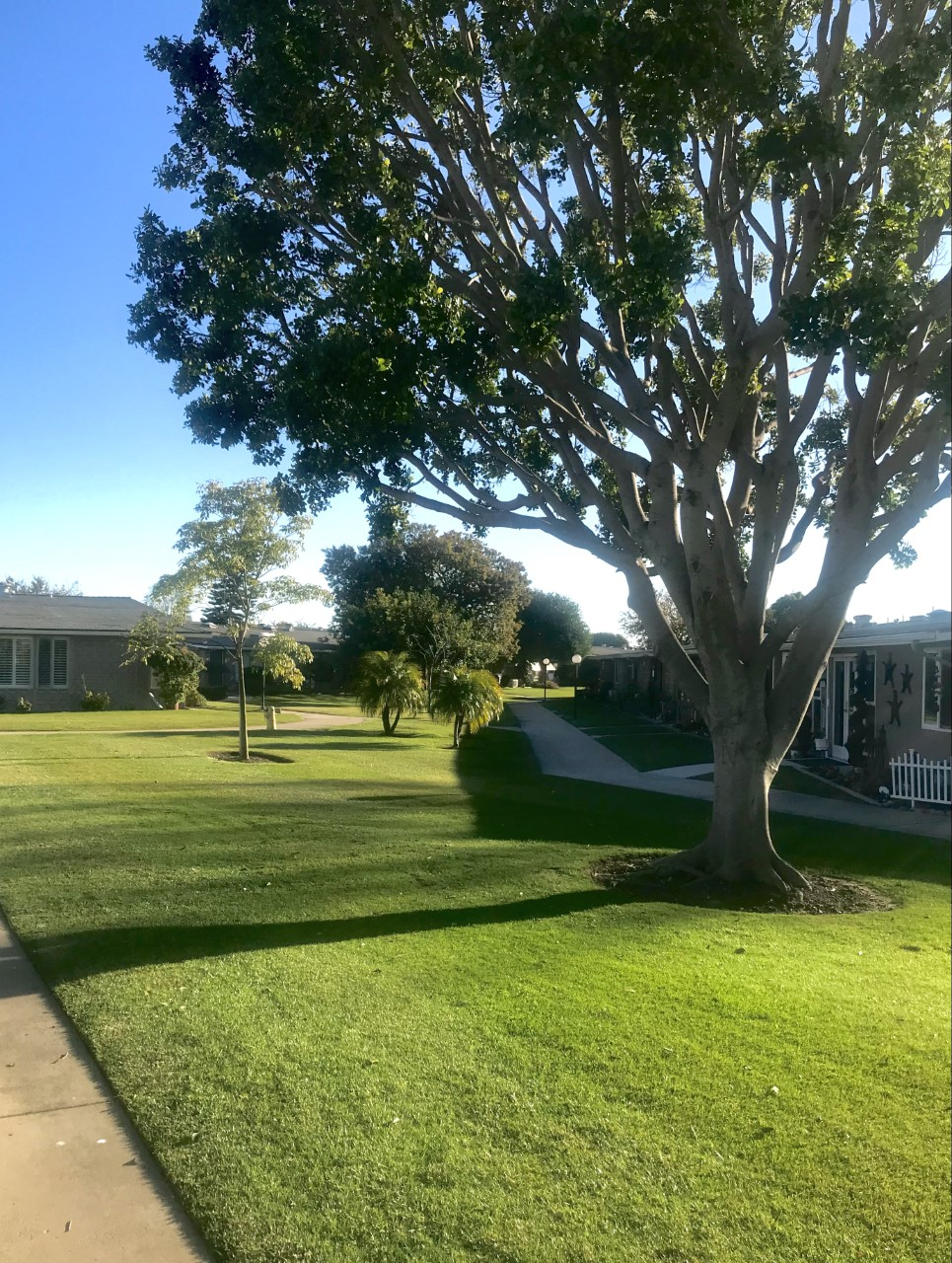
Over 20% of Leisure World is devoted to green spaces and gardens.

While the development would include usual retirement amenities - a golf course, swimming pool, clubhouses and shuffleboard courts - the Seal Beach construction incorporated insights the Corteses had gained through their “desire for data about older adults.” Stairs, steps and curbs would be replaced by ramps. Countertops and wide doors simplified wheelchair access. Showers had built-in seats to avoid slipping accidents. An on-site medical center and pharmacy would provide free access to doctors, diagnostic services, physical therapy and medication to all residents. Every mutual would include large greenbelts, and centralized parking structures would preserve the residential units’ parklike setting and encourage walking and physical activity.

=== Opening ===
On Oct. 29, 1961, about four months after construction began, the first model units, called “manors,” went on public display. By day's end, 10,000 people had thronged the grounds and approximately 550 of the 844 units offered had been sold. By March 1963, the administration estimated 300,000 people had toured the grounds and the model homes.

The development's sub-800-square-foot units drew surprisingly prosperous buyers. Even though most residents no longer worked, their annual per-capita income in 1963 was $6,000, 80% higher than the national average.

On June 8, 1962, a single year after construction began, the first residents moved in. A year later, 5,200 of the units had been sold. Over 10% of the first 4,500 units were purchased via mail transactions, many without the buyers ever having seen Leisure World. All the original units were sold by late 1964.

== Leisure World's "Medicare" ==
The Corteses’ health plan, launched amid a vigorous national debate over government involvement in social welfare measures, was frequently labeled “utopian.” It was an important perk touted in the extensive advertising and public relations campaigns that drew attention from national magazines, local broadcasters and newspapers throughout the United States and Canada.

The community's initial executive director, Lewis M. Letson, formerly the top administrator at St. Francis Medical Center in Lynwood, California, said Leisure World's health plan was explicit proof the free enterprise could effectively meet older adults’ health care requirements: “It indicates that there are better solutions to the medical needs of the elderly than socialized medicine.”

The Corteses made major investments in the medical plan. Cortese recruited a former medical director for the United States Public Health Service, surgeon Weldon A. Williamson, to be Leisure World's medical director. Leisure World was almost immediately recognized as a test bed for senior health. Within the clinic's first year, two studies, on heart and vascular diseases, were being conducted among the community's population.

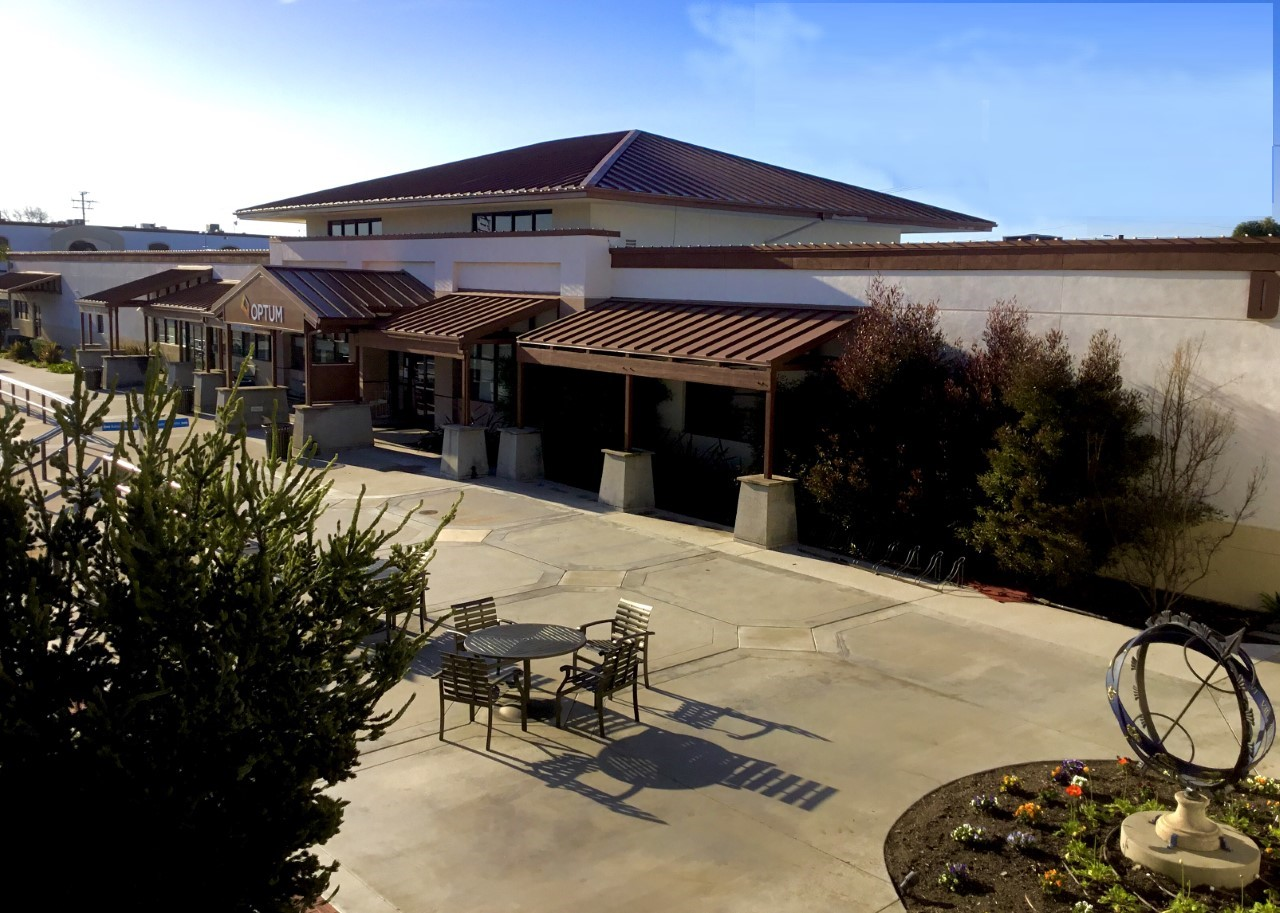
A healthcare center has been onsite since Leisure World's founding.

Similarly, the concentration of seniors in one well-known community located in politically conservative Orange County made Leisure World a target for the John F. Kennedy administration's push for its projected government-subsidized senior health care plan. In a 1963 visit to Leisure World, Kennedy's under-secretary for Health, Education and Welfare, Ivan A. Nestingen, mocked the American Medical Association, which he said characterized medical professionals urging government elder health care as “quacks and charlatans.” After Kennedy's assassination, President Lyndon B. Johnson dispatched his and Kennedy's press secretary, Pierre Salinger, to make another personal pitch for what would become known as Medicare.

Ironically, the Corteses’ health care plan precipitated their removal from direct involvement in Leisure World Seal Beach's management. Almost immediately after the first Leisure World residents settled in, their recognition of the value of free doctor visits, medical tests and prescriptions overwhelmed the 10 doctors and 26 nurses Leisure World had hired to manage the community's health needs. The Corteses’ projections dramatically underestimated the attraction of free health care. Instead of the predicted 6.2 doctor visits per year, Leisure World residents averaged 12 doctor visits annually.

In 1963, the GRF board coped with the unexpected costs by replacing free medical services with a 20% co-pay for all services and prescriptions. In 1964, when the community's governing board asked for an assessment increase, the medical care fee constituted 70% of the additional $10.50 requested. The resulting resident revolt led to the 1965 GRF vs. Leisure World Foundation lawsuit that effectively severed the Corteses’ continued involvement in Leisure World-Seal Beach's administration.

The rollout of the federal Medicare program, enacted by the Johnson administration in 1965, caused Leisure World to abandon its community-run health plan. On March 7, 1966, the first Leisure World residents signed up for Medicare.

== Services ==
With the exception of the free medical plan, the Corteses’ concept of a comprehensive seniors’ community was largely fulfilled. The community operates a heated swimming pool and spa, a 10,000-square-foot fitness center, and 9-hole, par-3 golf course. All were renovated or rebuilt between 2020 and 2022. Dedicated facilities are also provided for pickleball, bocce ball, ballet and dance classes, table tennis, shuffleboard and billiards.

Its five clubhouses contain studios for art, woodworking, lapidary, ceramics and needle arts. Other spaces are provided for video production, theater events and the activities of over 150 clubs.

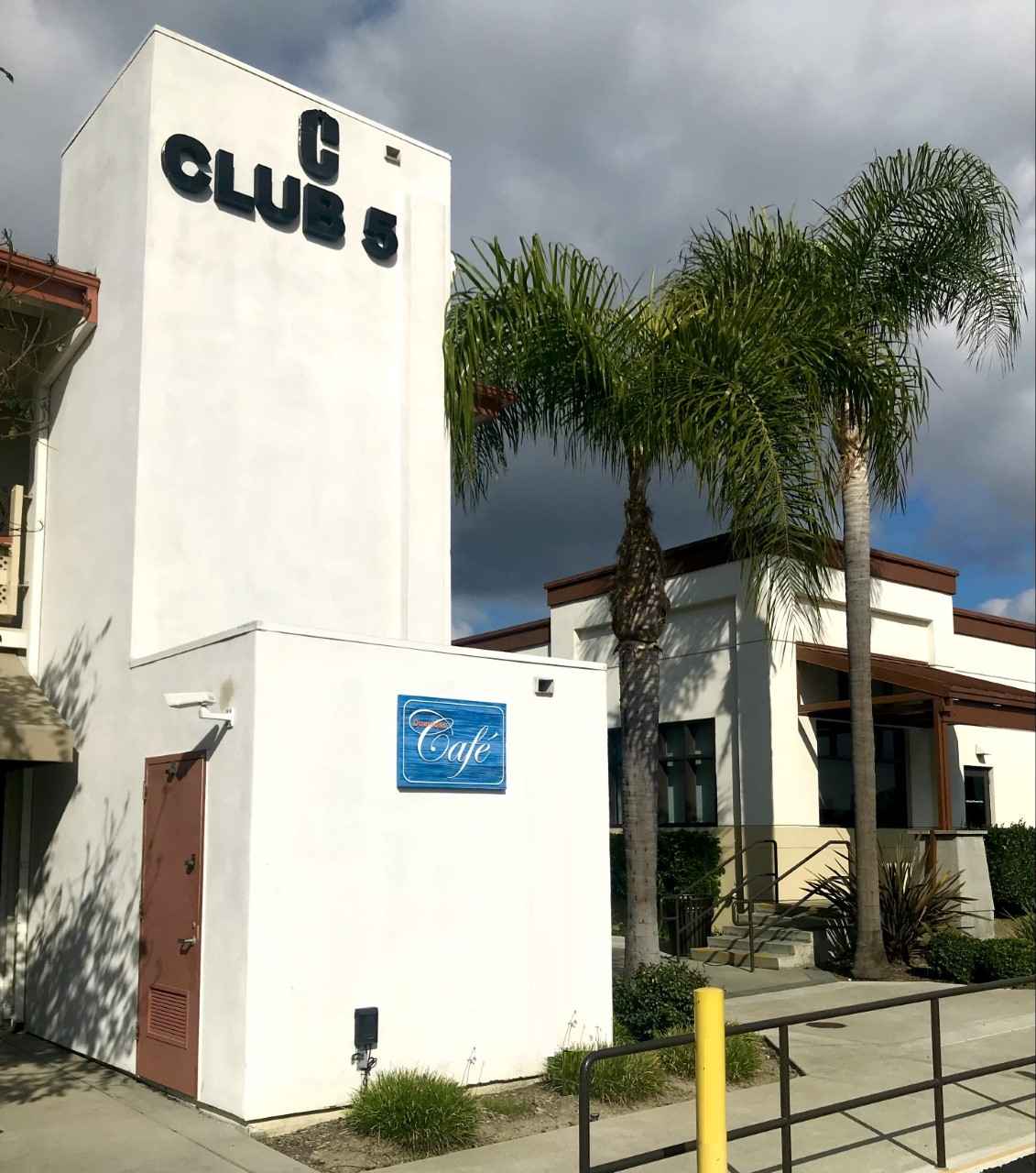
Leisure World's clubhouses host activities for most of the community's 150 clubs.

In the wake of Orange County's 1994 bankruptcy, GRF bought the building and collection of the Orange County Library branch adjacent to Leisure World and enclosed it and its 40,000-volume collection within the community's security wall. In 2021, the community opened an internet-enabled learning center to host college courses, and a fully equipped cooking classroom for instruction in cuisines and nutrition. Arts events and guest speakers appear in the clubhouse meeting rooms and two specially dedicated performance venues, a 2,500-seat outdoor amphitheater that hosts a summer-long series, and a smaller stage adjoining the library.

The community has an on-site medical center managed by a private company that provides resident doctors, X-rays, laboratory services, a physical therapy clinic, optometry services, acupuncture, specialist care, and an adjacent pharmacy. Leisure World also houses a credit union; weekly newspaper; copy center; three independent, free-standing churches, with scores of other congregations meeting in clubhouse facilities; a recycling collection facility; and car wash. Leisure World is one of Seal Beach's major employers, and its approximately 175 full- and part-time workers provide maintenance, infrastructure inspection, property transfer and financial services. The GRF's security department provides patrol service, gate control and parking enforcement 24 hours a day. A Cortese-built 12.5-acre shopping center immediately outside the security wall now houses financial institutions and advisors, medical and dental offices, hair stylists, an automotive repair and service station, and stores selling golf equipment, jewelry, medical supplies, groceries and general supplies. Scheduled minibus routes crisscrossing the community offer free transportation within Leisure World and connections to Orange County Transportation buses and commuter rail lines.

Community volunteers provide other services. The Golden Age Foundation is a 501(c)3 charity that has donated hundreds of thousands of dollars to fund Leisure World projects, and scores of other community groups provide financial and volunteer help to residents and community projects.

== In the News ==
=== Should Elders Have Leisure? ===
Even before Leisure World Seal Beach was completed, the firm's significant marketing campaign assured Leisure World would be the "poster child" in a national discussion of the social, economic and psychological implications of age-segregated communities. While some journalists lauded the youthful energy Leisure World residents exhibited, one Newsweek writer suggested too much leisure weakened elderly minds. He mocked retirement villages as escapist, places where “reality and utopian fantasy merge in ‘an air of elegant euphoria.’” Simultaneously, “old-age ghettos” was how a syndicated essay portrayed Leisure World and its ilk. An Associated Press article, “Let’s Quit Working and Retire,” even chided the pre-70 retirees of Leisure World and similar developments for slacking in their duty to enrich the American economy.

=== 1995 Flood ===
A flood control channel that traverses Leisure World Seal Beach overflowed in the wake of a 5-inch rainstorm on January 4, 1995. Approximately 170 Leisure World units were declared uninhabitable, and 200 more suffered some water damage. The amphitheater filled with 10 feet of water, while the basement of the Redeemer Lutheran Church held 12 feet of water. Seal Beach's mayor estimated the flood caused $2 million in damages.

=== HOA Law ===
Leisure World Seal Beach's pioneering role in introducing cooperative community governance to California led it to be a party in two important lawsuits that helped establish the state's homeowner association (HOA) regulations.

==== Golden Rain Foundation v. Leisure World Foundation (1965–1966) ====
To assure creditors for the Seal Beach development would be paid, the FHA advocated continued professional management of Leisure World. As community fees rose to pay for the Leisure World medical plan, an often-bitter series of public meetings erupted pitting residents against management. According to court documents, “a local city official” suggested to GRF's executive director “that it might be well to conduct an investigation” of Lloyd Gummere, the leader of the residents’ protest group who was also a candidate for the Seal Beach city council. When two private detectives were arrested for wiretapping Gummere's phone, an active revolt began. After a dissident slate of candidates unseated the 1963-64 GRF board, that incumbent board bound the 1964-65 board to a management agreement with a Cortese-affiliated company. Some shareholders suggested the decision ceding control to Cortese's now-multi-community management company weakened the developers’ original promise that “residents will formulate the policies of the community.” Although facing vigorous opposition from the FHA, the new GRF board sued Cortese. In October 1966, the court voided ties with Cortese's management company, allowing the GRF board to make fundamental decisions about managing the community.

==== Golden Rain Foundation v. Carol Franz (2004–2008) ====
A group of shareholders petitioned for access to GRF board documents under California regulations governing HOAs. GRF asserted that because GRF owned no residences, it was not an HOA, but a management company under contract to the home-owning mutuals. In a series of cases ending at the California Court of Appeals, GRF's structure, which GRF's expert witness testified was “unique” within the United States, was ruled to be an HOA and subject to all relevant provisions.

== Demographics ==
In 2019, 9,595 people, with an average age of 74, lived in Leisure World Seal Beach. Slightly more than 60 percent were female. Thirty-three percent of the community's population was over 80. Fifty-one residents were aged 100 or more. The population density of the development's 531 acres is 11,560 people per square mile.

== Attractions ==
The Leisure World Globe, located at the development's Seal Beach Boulevard entrance, is one of the nation's largest globes. Cortese wanted his new development to attract attention and remembered the 50-foot Globe-A-Drome in the 1939 Golden Gate International Exposition’s midway. Frustrated in his attempt to buy the original, he commissioned a 32-foot-tall, 14-ton rotating structure that originally was surrounded by fountains. The Leisure World globe is frequently thought to be modeled on the 1964 New York World’s Fair Unisphere, but it was completed months before the Unisphere’s plans were unveiled. The Leisure World globe is the only free-standing sculptural piece listed among “Orange County’s 125 Icons” during the county's 125th anniversary. It was refurbished in 2016.

The Leisure World Amphitheater is a 2,500-seat outdoor performance space that hosts community gatherings and performances, and national entertainers. Its proscenium, stage and pit closely replicate the Hollywood Bowl’s first permanent structure, which opened in July 1922.

The Leisure World Historical Society Museum, a display of artifacts, photographs and documents, displayed in the first-built Leisure World clubhouse. The development’s historical archives are now located at the University of California, Irvine.

A bronze statue of a ballerina, Premiere Danseuse Etoile, by noted Italian sculptor Pino Conte (1915-1997), is mounted at the entrance to Leisure World Seal Beach’s Administration Building. Now referred to within the community as “Twiggy,” it was a 1963 gift to the community from the Corteses.

=== Located within a 3-mile radius of Leisure World ===
California State University, Long Beach

- Carolyn Campagna Kleefeld Contemporary Art Museum
- Earl Burns Miller Japanese Garden
- Carpenter Arts Center - The Carpenters’ memorabilia are exhibited in this concert hall
- Walter Pyramid – 18-story CSULB arena is one of the United States’ three true pyramids

Joint Forces Training Base – Los Alamitos

- JFTB Aquatics Center: U.S. Women's National Water Polo Team training site is open to public
- Navy Golf Course: public 27-hole facility was Tiger Woods’ childhood home course

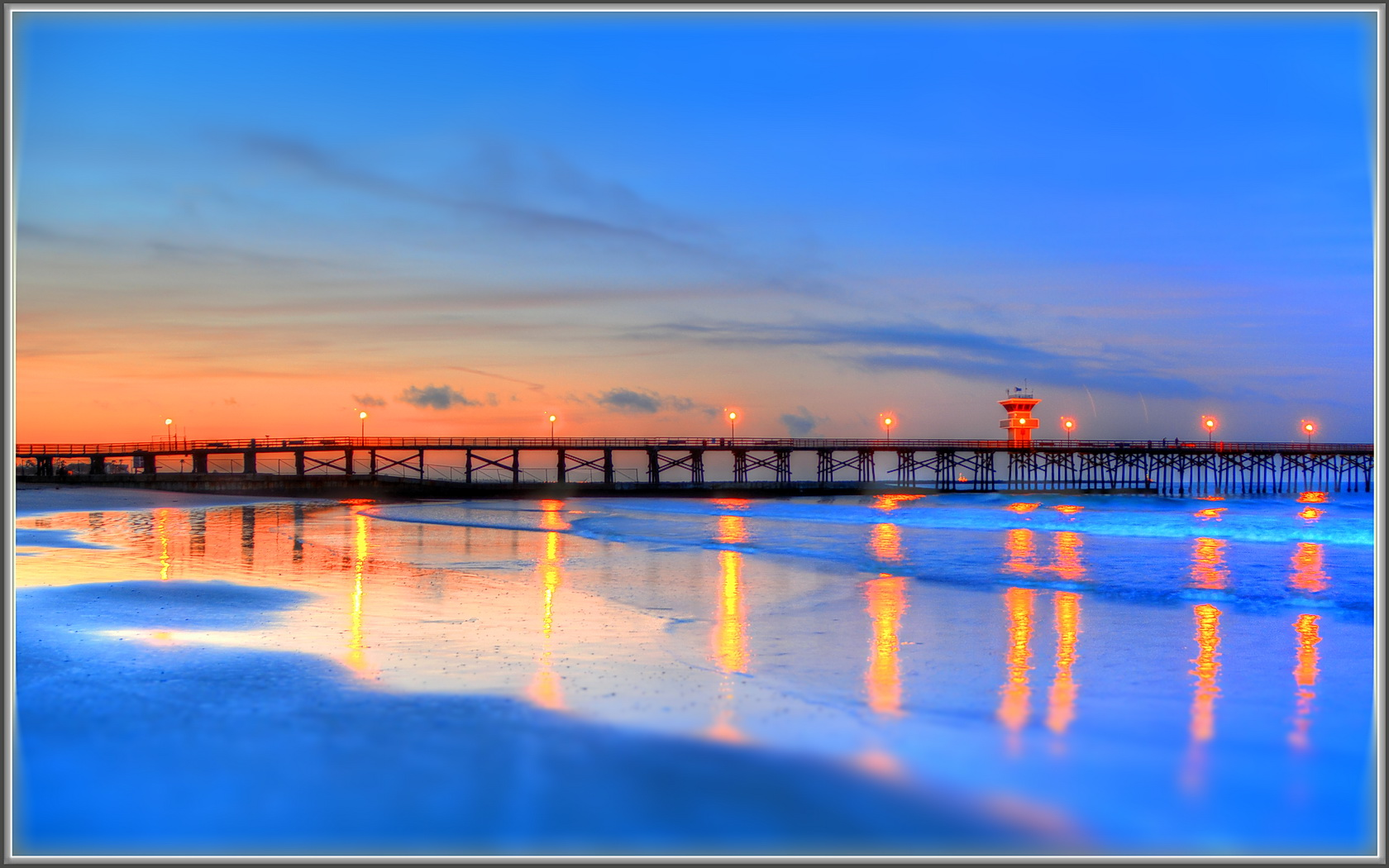
Seal Beach Pier

Long Beach Marina: U.S.’s largest municipally-owned marina system, with 3,600 slips

Rancho Los Alamitos – In the 1850s, this was headquarters for the largest U.S. cattle ranch. Early 19th century buildings and Frederick Law Olmsted Jr.-designed gardens are open for tours.

Seal Beach Municipal Pier – at 1,835 feet, California’s second-longest wooden pier

San Gabriel River Trail – 35-mile trail from Azusa to Seal Beach passes alongside the community

Seal Beach National Wildlife Refuge

U.S. Naval Weapons Station Seal Beach

- World War II National Submarine Memorial – West

== In popular culture ==
In 1964, ABC’s Queen for a Day broadcast an entire show dedicated to women in Leisure World. At the show’s conclusion, host Jack Bailey granted that day’s winner, Leisure World resident Mabel Menke, with her wish for a new tricycle.

In 1986, an episode of NBC’s Highway to Heaven, starring and directed by Michael Landon, was filmed at Leisure World Seal Beach. The episode, titled “Love at Second Sight,” premiered Nov. 6, 1986, in the series’ third season.

Future U.S. presidents Richard Nixon, Ronald Reagan and George H.W. Bush spoke at Leisure World during campaign events. Future presidential candidate, U.S. Sen. Elizabeth Dole, campaigned in Leisure World for her spouse, United States Senate Majority Leader Bob Dole, during his 1996 presidential campaign.

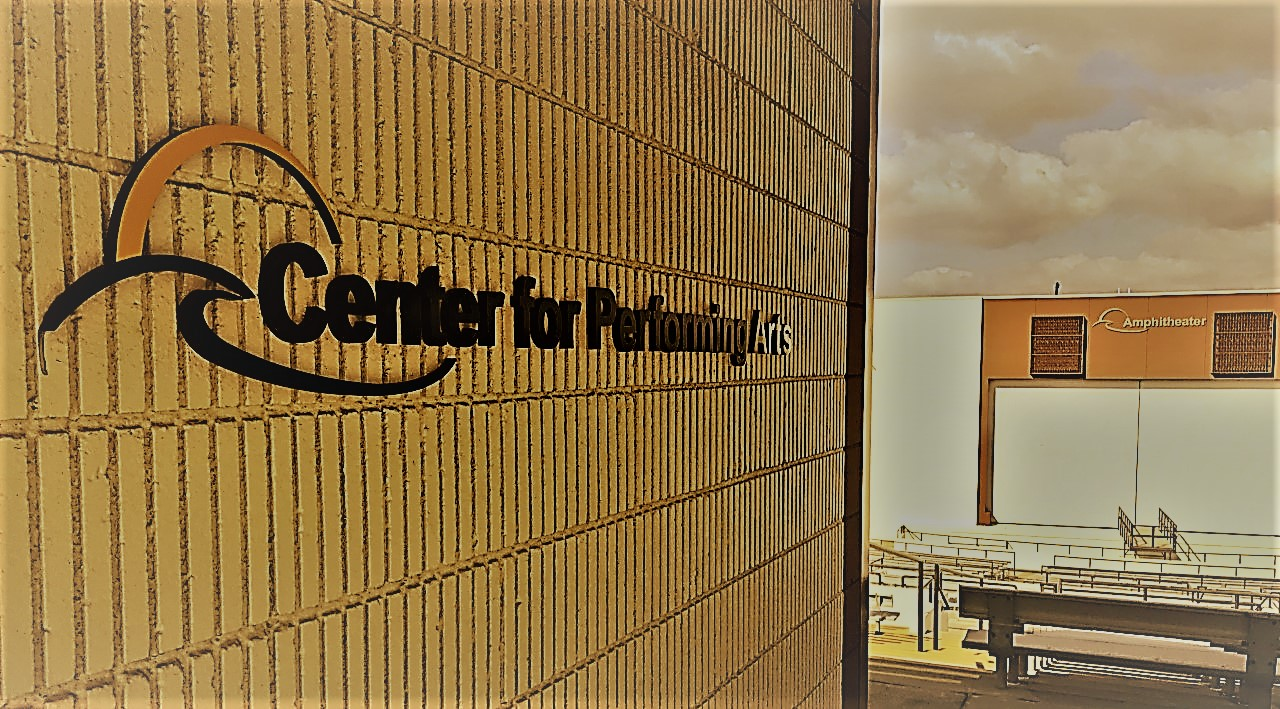
The 2,500-seat amphitheater hosts a summer concert series.

Leisure World Seal Beach's proximity to Los Angeles assured its summer amphitheater concerts often had star lineups. The weekly events have featured singers Debbie Reynolds, Rosemary Clooney, Kathryn Grayson, Pat Boone, Glen Campbell, Anita O’Day, Tony Martin, Buddy Greco, Frankie Avalon, John Davidson and Frankie Laine; and the bands or orchestras of Harry James, Benny Goodman, Gene Krupa, Les Brown, Nelson Riddle and Lawrence Welk. Prominent small groups included The Mills Brothers, The Ink Spots, The Lettermen, The Kingston Trio, The Four Freshmen, The Coasters, The Lennon Sisters, and The Diamonds. Among the actors who appeared at the Amphitheater were Mickey Rooney, Dorothy Lamour, Buddy Ebsen, Nanette Fabray, Martha Raye, Florence Henderson and Sally Kellerman.

== Recognition ==
- Ross Cortese named “Builder of the Year” in 1963 by National Association of Home Builders
- Ross Cortese inducted into Housing Hall of Fame in 1983 by National Association of Home Builders
- Ross and Alona Cortese named among “The Most 100 Influential Builders of the Century” in 1999 by Builder Magazine
- Named among "Seven Most Popular Destinations for Seniors,” in 2017 by The Motley Fool
- Voted “Best Orange County Leisure Community” by Los Angeles Times Readers’ Poll in 2019, 2020 and 2022
- Named among "America's Seven Best and Most Affordable Beach Towns for Retirement in 2020 by National Association of Realtors.
- Named among 10 Most Affordable Beach Towns to Buy a Home in 2022 by National Association of Realtors.
- Voted Best Retirement Community and Best Active Adult Living Community in 2025 by readers of Long Beach Press-Telegram.

== Notable people ==
- Cecile Belle Adam, (1881-1977): After completing post-graduate studies at the University of Wisconsin, Adam published the novel, Red of the Dawn, in 1937.
- Alice B. Addenbrooke, (1881-1972): Led fundraising and supervised restoration to save two National Register of Historic Places properties: Nevada's Bowers Mansion and Fort Churchill State Historic Park, and wrote a book about each.
- Don Albin Alford, (1897-1973): Plowed the fortune he made in the 1921 Signal Hill oil strike into founding and publishing The Independent newspaper, one of the precursors to today’s Long Beach Press-Telegram.
- Tom Amberry, (1922-2017): At age 71, made 2,750 consecutive basketball free throws to set a Guinness World Record.
- William W. Biddle, (1900-1973): Academic social scientist, he made important early steps in studying the psychological effects of propaganda and later altered the study of community development.
- Loureide J. Biddle, (1902-1996): An Earlham College professor, she co-wrote The Community Development Process with her husband, William W. Biddle.
- Dee Booher, (1948-2022): Athlete and actor, she skated in professional roller derby before joining the initial cast of Gorgeous Ladies of Wrestling (G.L.O.W.) as “Matilda the Hun.” She guest hosted The Gong Show 14 times and appeared in Married... with Children and Night Court.
- Ruby Frazier Coppedge, (1892-1970): As Ruby Frazier Frey, she wrote the best-selling 1946 historical novel, "Red Morning," relating the story of her ancestor, Jane Frazier, and her colonial-era capture by the Delaware Tribe, her escape and several-hundred-mile wilderness trek to return to her family.
- Richard C. Currier, (1893-1984): Editing department head at the Hal Roach Studios from 1920 to 1932, he worked on nearly every Laurel and Hardy and Our Gang comedy. During his 39-year career in movies and television, he logged over 400 editing and directing credits.
- Friedrich, Frank (1903-1988), and Joseph (1906-1997): Sibling Hollywood hair stylists who turned Marilyn Monroe blonde, and styled actresses Ingrid Bergman and Rita Hayworth, and wrestler Gorgeous George.
- Earl Stanfield Fullbrook, (1883-1964): University of Nebraska dean of business, he also served as the National Collegiate Athletic Association's secretary/treasurer. The University of Nebraska–Lincoln annually presents the Fullbrook Award for marketing studies.
- Anton Grot (1884-1974): A five-time Academy Award nominee for art direction, Grot was credited with creating the classic 1930s Warner Bros.'s signature look. He is a member of the Art Directors Guild Hall of Fame.
- Luella J. Hall, (1891-1973): After receiving a doctorate in history from Stanford University and completing a 40-year teaching career, Hall published a 1,114-page tome, The United States and Morocco, 1776-1956, shortly before her death.
- Joseph J. Healy, (1926-2019): 1970s CEO of Flying Tiger Line, the world's largest air cargo carrier prior to the airline's purchase by Federal Express Corporation.
- Luke I.C. Kim, (1930-2015): Founding president of the Association of Korean-American Psychiatrists, he was considered a major figure in introducing how cultural factors influence the treatment of mental illness among Asians.
- Mary F. Lindsley, (1907-1997): A creative writing professor at New York City's Hunter College for 41 years, she published over 15 books of fiction, poetry and plays. Also wrote as Mary L. Jaffee.
- Joseph Longfield, (1890-1975): Mayor of Hanford, California, the city's community center is named after him.
- Sherman Lowe, (1894-1968): Screenwriter for Hollywood westerns, adventures, musicals and spy films, he contributed to many serials, including The Cisco Kid, Frank Buck's Jungle Menace, The Green Hornet Strikes Again! and Captain Video: Master of the Stratosphere.
- Glen MacWilliams, (1898-1984): Academy Award nominee for Alfred Hitchcock's 1944 feature, Lifeboat, he photographed films and television shows in England and United States from 1914 through 1969.
- Buddy McDonald, (1922-2008): One of the Our Gang child actors in the early 1930s, as a recovered alcoholic he founded several rehabilitation centers that pioneered "best of practice" techniques for treating addictions.
- Kate Pedigo, (1911-2016): A folk-art painter who wrote and published books in three different genres after her 80th birthday.
- Alvin P. Pierson, (1898-1975): Finance professor at California State-Fullerton for 27 years, he was a Fulbright Program professor in Iraq and served as the university's interim head football coach for two years.
- Francis B. Settle, M.D., (1891-1975): A founding member in 1937 of the American Board of Surgery, the group helped established certification procedures to distinguish surgery as a specialty practice apart from general practitioners.
