= Los Alamitos High School =

Public high school in Los Alamitos, California, United States

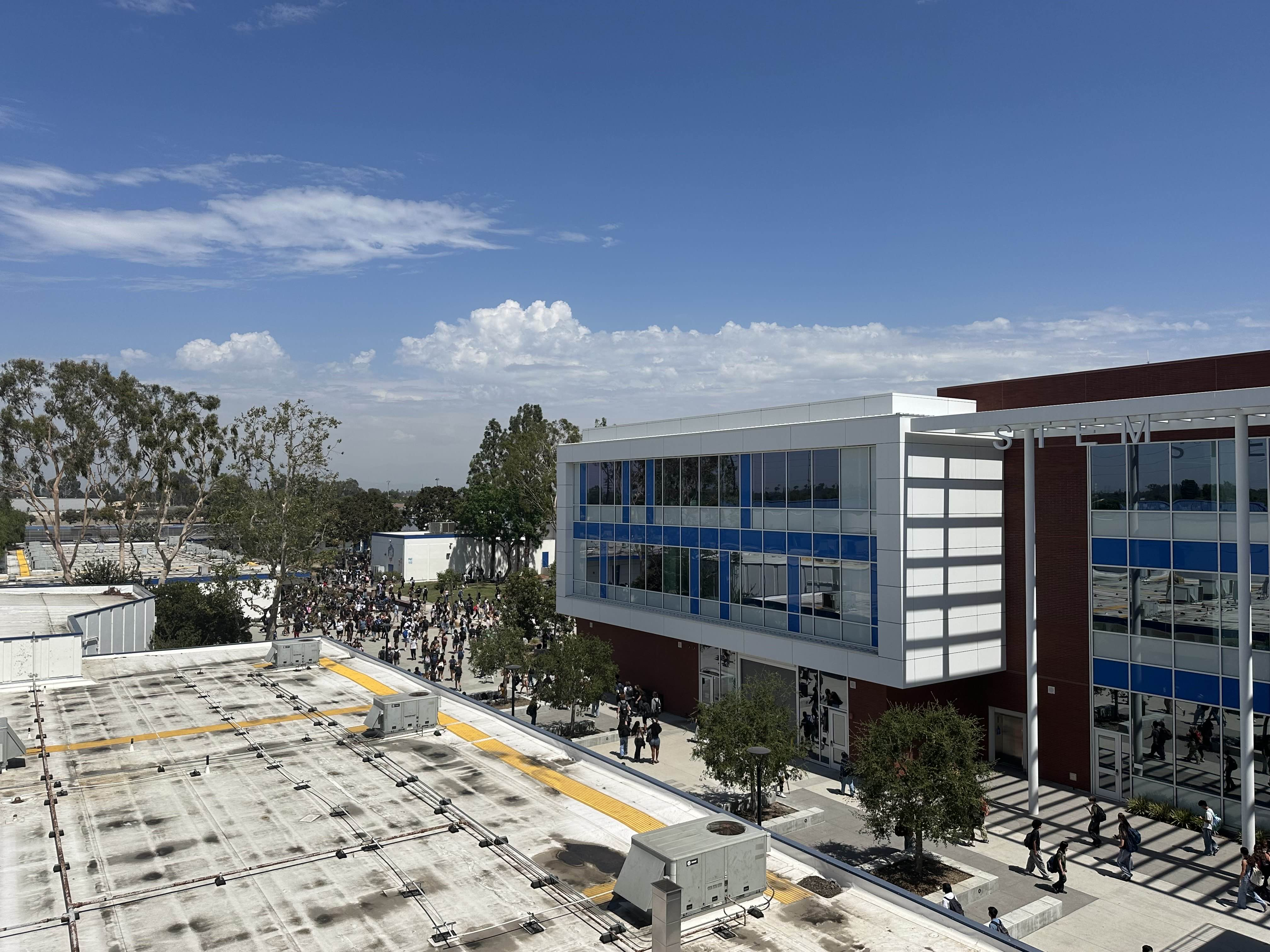

Location
- 3591 W Cerritos Ave; Los Alamitos, California 90720; 33.81141°N 118.07127°W

Information
- Type: Public high school
- Established: 1967
- School district: Los Alamitos Unified School District
- Principal: Cara Vienna
- Teaching staff: 116.50 (FTE)
- Grades: 9 - 12
- Enrollment: 2,915 (2024-2025)
- Student to teacher ratio: 25.02
- Colors: Blue; White; Red; Gold
- Athletics conference: CIF Southern Section; Sunset League
- Mascot: Griffin
- Website: LAHS School website

Los Alamitos High School (also known as Los Al) is a public school for grades 9 to 12 located in Los Alamitos, California, and also serving the city of Seal Beach and the community of Rossmoor. It is the only high school in the Los Alamitos Unified School District. Both Oak Middle School and McAuliffe Middle School feed into Los Alamitos High.

== History ==
Los Alamitos High School initially opened at Pine Junior High with only sophomores before moving to its permanent W. Cerritos campus the next year. During its first two years, the school utilized a highly flexible scheduling system where students hand-wrote their daily class plans. In its third year, the school transitioned to a computer-generated scheduling system to improve student accountability while still allowing students to adjust open periods. However, because some students abused this freedom, the flexible scheduling system was replaced with a traditional school schedule in 1977.

Beginning in fall 1987, the Orange County High School of the Arts was resident on its campus, but its success and growth led it to move to a bigger campus in Santa Ana in 2001.

== Extracurricular activities ==
=== Athletic programs ===
Los Al is known for its success in many Varsity sports. The boys' Varsity Football team won a CIF Southern Section Division 3 title in 1991, Division 2 titles in 1992, 1993 (shared title with Esperanza,) and 2025, and won a Division 1 title in 2002. They have also reached the finals and semi-finals on numerous other occasions.

The Boys' water polo team was also CIF-SS Division II champions in fall 1999, and 2004 and were CIF-SS Masters champions in 2007.

The boys' Los Al Tennis team won the CIF SS Division I Championship in 2001 and again in 2015. After the 2015 season, multiple publications listen the Griffins as the best high school tennis team in the nation. Considering the level of competition in tennis in Southern California, this was a most notable accomplishment. It was in CIF Division I semi-finals in 1999 and 2000. From 1995 through 2001 it had a league record of 69–1, an overall record of 128–18 and produced 16 All-Orange County selections. Additionally, 55 players were honored as scholar athletes and went on to play at college level. The team received recognition from the Mayors of the cities of Los Alamitos and Seal Beach for its contribution to positive publicity.

The girls' volleyball team has won a number of CIF local and state championships. It was CIF Southern Section Division IA champions in 2002, 2004, and 2013 and won CIF Division I State championships in 2003, 2005, and 2006, and came in second 2013. In 2018, the team won the CIF Southern Section Division 2 championship and lost in the quarterfinals in the CIF Division 1 State Championships.

Girls' soccer won CIF section titles in 1996 (Div. II), 1997 (Div. I) and 2005 (Div. I). The last team was also named the No. 1 team in the nation by Student Sports Magazine. Another indicator of the success of the program was that in 2007 there were 17 Los Al alumni girls playing NCAA Division I soccer.

The Griffin Varsity Boys' soccer team won CIF-Southern Section titles in 1991, 2002, and 2026. In 2026, they also won the first-ever CIF Division III State Championships. Cooper Coleman scored the deciding goal in that State Championship Game against Watsonville. Alums Mike Munoz (2001) and Jonathan Bornstein (2002) have both made MLS rosters (LA Galaxy and Chivas USA respectively,) and Bornstein was not only the 2006 MLS Rookie of the Year Award winner, but also captained the US Men's National team roster.

The boys' Basketball team won CIF Division I-A and I-AA championships in 2006 and 2007, respectively. Los Al Basketball great Ali Ton once held the assist record at Davidson College. In 2025, the Griffins returned to the CIF SS Division 1 final, defeating Mira Costa High School 63-60 to win their first title in 18 years. Trent Minter was recognized as CIF Division 1 Player of the Year, Coach Nate Berger CIF Division 1 Coach of the Year, and Wesley Trevino made CIF Division 1 All First Team

The Los Alamitos High School Marching Band has competed in circuits such as Western Band Association (WBA), Marching Band Open Series (MBOS), and the California State Band Championships (CSBC). In 2009 and 2010 they placed 1st in the WBA 3A division as well as the combined 1A/2A/3A Finals, and in 2011 and 2012 the unit placed 3rd in the WBA 3A division. In 2013 they placed 2nd in the WBA 3A division, 3rd in the combined 1A/2A/3A Finals, 1st in the MBOS Black Opal division, and 7th in the combined MBOS Finals. The unit also has an award-winning drumline and color guard.

The LAHS Surf Team took second place over all in ISF State Championships in 2009. Boys' Shortboard finished with second place, bodyboard placed third and Girls' Longboard finished as State Champions. Los Al finished in third place in 2008 and first place in 2007 and 2006.

The LAHS Girls' Lacrosse team was the undefeated CIF Division I Orange County and Southern Section Champions in 2009 and 2010. Los Al finished the season ranked #4 in the state of California.

==== CIF teams ====
Note: This list does not include sports which are currently clubs and thus not officially recognized in CIF.

- Basketball
- Baseball
- Softball
- Football
- Cross Country
- Golf
- Soccer
- Swimming and Diving
- Tennis
- Track and Field
- Volleyball
- Wrestling
- Water Polo
- Surfing
- Lacrosse

=== Show Choir ===
Los Alamitos High School has a noted show choir program. Since 2009, Los Alamitos show choirs have held championship titles more than 175 times at various regional and national competitions, across six competitive show choirs and a concert choir. Most notably Sound FX, but additionally Soundtrax, Connexion, Xquisite, Xtreme, Axcent, and Xpressions.

Sound FX have been named Grand Champion 14 times at national competitions and went undefeated in the 2018, 2020 and 2023 competition seasons. Sound FX has recorded and performed with numerous famous artists, including Barry Manilow, Patti Lupone, Kristin Chenoweth, Journey, Foreigner, and Major Parkinson.

Soundtrax have been named Grand Champion 11 times at national competitions since 2015, and went undefeated in the 2019, 2020, and 2022 competition seasons.

Notable recent alumni of the Los Alamitos show choir program include actress Jenna Lea Rosen and recording artist and American Idol contestant Sophia Wackerman.

List of National Accolades
| Show Choir | National Title | Year(s) Achieved | Citations |
|---|---|---|---|
| Sound FX | SCC Show Choir National Grand Champion | 2010, 2014, 2016, 2019, 2022 | |
| Sound FX | Fame Hollywood Grand Champion | 2012 | |
| Sound FX | Fame Orlando Grand Champion | 2013 | |
| Sound FX | Fame New York Grand Champion | 2015 | |
| Sound FX | Fame Show Choir National Finals Grand Champion | 2015, 2016, 2017 | |
| Sound FX | Heart of America Orlando Grand Champion | 2018 | |
| Sound FX | Heart of America New York City Grand Champion | 2023 | |
| Soundtrax | Show Choir National Grand Champion | 2010, 2014, 2016, 2019, 2022 | |
| Soundtrax | Fame Show Choir National Finals Grand Champion | 2012, 2015, 2016, 2017 | |
| Soundtrax | Fame New York Grand Champion | 2015 | |

== Academic accolades ==
- United States Department of Education National Blue Ribbon School – 1990, 1994, 1998 (Special Honors in Art Education for 1998)
- California Department of Education California Distinguished School – 1988, 1994, 1998, 2009
- California School Boards Association Golden Bell Awards – 1998 (Griffins with a Mission), 2005 (Contemporary Media in the Arts)
- California Gold Ribbon School – 2016

== Notable alumni ==
=== Actors ===
- Dante Basco – actor
- Stephanie J. Block – singer, actress
- Cathy Cavadini – voice actress
- Chad Doreck – actor
- Susan Egan – singer, actress
- Kayla Ewell – actress
- Michael Fishman – actor
- Lauren German – actress
- Jason Lewis – actor
- Allison Mack – actress
- Taryn Manning – actress
- Matthew Morrison – stage actor
- Pedro Pascal – actor
- Sarah Ramos – actress
- Cathy Rigby – Olympic gymnast, stage actress
- Matthew Shaffer – actor
- Clayton Snyder – actor
- Jodie Sweetin – actress
- Anneliese Van der Pol – singer, actress

2020}}

=== Diplomats ===
- Andrew Robert Young 1980 - United States Department of State US Ambassador to Burkina Faso 2016-2020

=== Sports ===
- Andrew Alvarez 2017 - Washington Nationals pitcher
- Jonathan Bornstein 2002 – professional soccer – Querétaro (Liga MX); US national soccer team.
- Tim Carey – Former Arena Football League player.
- Antoine Cason 2004 – Former NFL cornerback, All-American University of Arizona, 2007 NCAA Jim Thorpe Award Winner.
- Ron Cassidy – 1975 – NFL – former (Green Bay Packers) 1979–1985.
- Craig Chamberlain - Kansas City Royals pitcher (1979-1980)
- Lynne Cox 1975 – long-distance open-water swimmer and author.
- Chase d'Arnaud 2005 – former Major League Baseball player.
- Jacqueline Frank DeLuca 1998 – American water polo goalkeeper, 2004 bronze medal Olympian and two-time collegiate National Player of the Year.
- Rachel Fattal 2012 – American water polo player, gold medal at 2016 Olympics.
- Landry Fields 2006 – NBA – former National Basketball Association player and Atlanta Hawks General Manager.
- Greg A. Harris 1974 – former Major League Baseball player.
- Charles Hinkle 2007 - basketball player
- Keenan Howry 1999 – NFL – former Minnesota Vikings wide receiver.
- Mike Kelly 1988 – former Major League Baseball player, 3-time All-America at Arizona State.
- Chris Kluwe 2000 – Former NFL punter, declared candidate for California's 72nd State Assembly district
- Makai Lemon 2021 - Philadelphia Eagles 2026 First Round Pick, former USC Wide Receiver, 2023 Under Armour All-American, 2022 CIF Division 1 Team, and 2022 Max Preps All America Team, 2025 Fred Biletnikoff Award Winner
- Darren McCaughan - MLB starter/reliever for the Seattle Mariners, Cleveland Guardians, Minnesota Twins, and Miami Marlins
- Tylor Megill – New York Mets pitcher
- Mike Munoz 2001 – Former MLS player.
- Malachi Nelson - #1 overall high school football prospect in 2023, played his freshman year at USC before transferring to Boise State, and then transferring again to UTEP the year after.
- Stacey Nelson 2005 – Softball – 2009 Florida Gators softball team; US Women's National team, 2009.
- Robb Nen 1987 – Retired Major League Baseball player. Played for the Texas Rangers, Florida Marlins, and San Francisco Giants.
- Leaonna Odom – WNBA small forward
- Ifeanyi Ohalete 1997 – NFL & AFL – former Washington Redskins, Arizona Cardinals, Cincinnati Bengals, and New York Dragons safety.
- Jacob Nix 2014 – Former San Diego Padres and Orix Buffaloes pitcher.
- Mike Patterson 2001 – NFL – First round draft in 2005 by the Philadelphia Eagles, played for New York Giants, All-American at USC.
- Greg Pirkl - Former MLB and NPB first baseman
- Alex Redmond 2013 – Former Cincinnati Bengals offensive guard.
- Bernard Riley 1999 – NFL & AFL – former defensive tackle of the Los Angeles Avengers, Columbus Destroyers, Arizona Rattlers, and Tampa Bay Buccaneers.
- Jared Rollins – UFC – The Ultimate Fighter season six on Spike.
- Mike Sanford Jr. – offensive coordinator at University of Minnesota, former head coach at Western Kentucky
- Orlando Scandrick 2005 – Former NFL cornerback.
- J. T. Snow 1986 – Retired Major League Baseball player. Played for the New York Yankees, California Angels, San Francisco Giants, and Boston Red Sox.
- Mark Wasikowski 1989 – Head baseball coach for the Oregon Ducks baseball team.
- Justine Wong-Orantes 2013 - Olympic gold medalist and professional volleyball player.
- Eyassu Worku 2016 - Current Professional Basketball Player for KK Dubrovnik in Croatia. All time leading scorer for Los Alamitos, 2016 McDonald's All American Nominee, Orange County Player of the Year. Played all 4 years of college basketball at UCI, scored over 1000 points, and led his team to a 2019 Big West Conference Tournament crown.

=== Music ===
- Kit Armstrong – pianist and composer
- Aaron Barrett – lead singer of the ska band Reel Big Fish
- Joe Escalante – bassist of The Vandals and owner of Kung Fu Records; on-air personality Indie 103-FM
- Scott Klopfenstein – current keyboardist, guitarist and singer from ska band Reel Big Fish as well as lead singer, pianist and guitar player of The Littlest Man Band
- Maile Misajon – singer in the band Eden's Crush
- Monique Powell and Steve White – of the ska band Save Ferris
- Soopafly – Hip hop producer
- Mark Trombino – Drummer of Drive Like Jehu and record producer.
- Chris Tsagakis and Matt Embree – both of Rx Bandits
- Brooks Wackerman – current drummer of Avenged Sevenfold, former drummer of Bad Religion, Suicidal Tendencies, and Bad 4 Good.

=== Notable criminals ===
- Mikhail Markhasev - Murdered Ennis Cosby, the 27 year old son of Bill Cosby, during a robbery.
- Jeremy Strohmeyer – Murdered 7 year old Sherrice Iverson at the Primadonna Resort and Casino in Primm, Nevada
- Daniel Wozniak - Murdered his neighbor and friend, Samuel Eliezer "Sam" Herr and Herr's friend, Juri "Julie" Kibuishi, as part of a plan to frame Herr for Kibuishi’s murder and steal his savings.
