= St. Isidore Catholic Church =

Historic church in California

- U.S. National Register of Historic Places
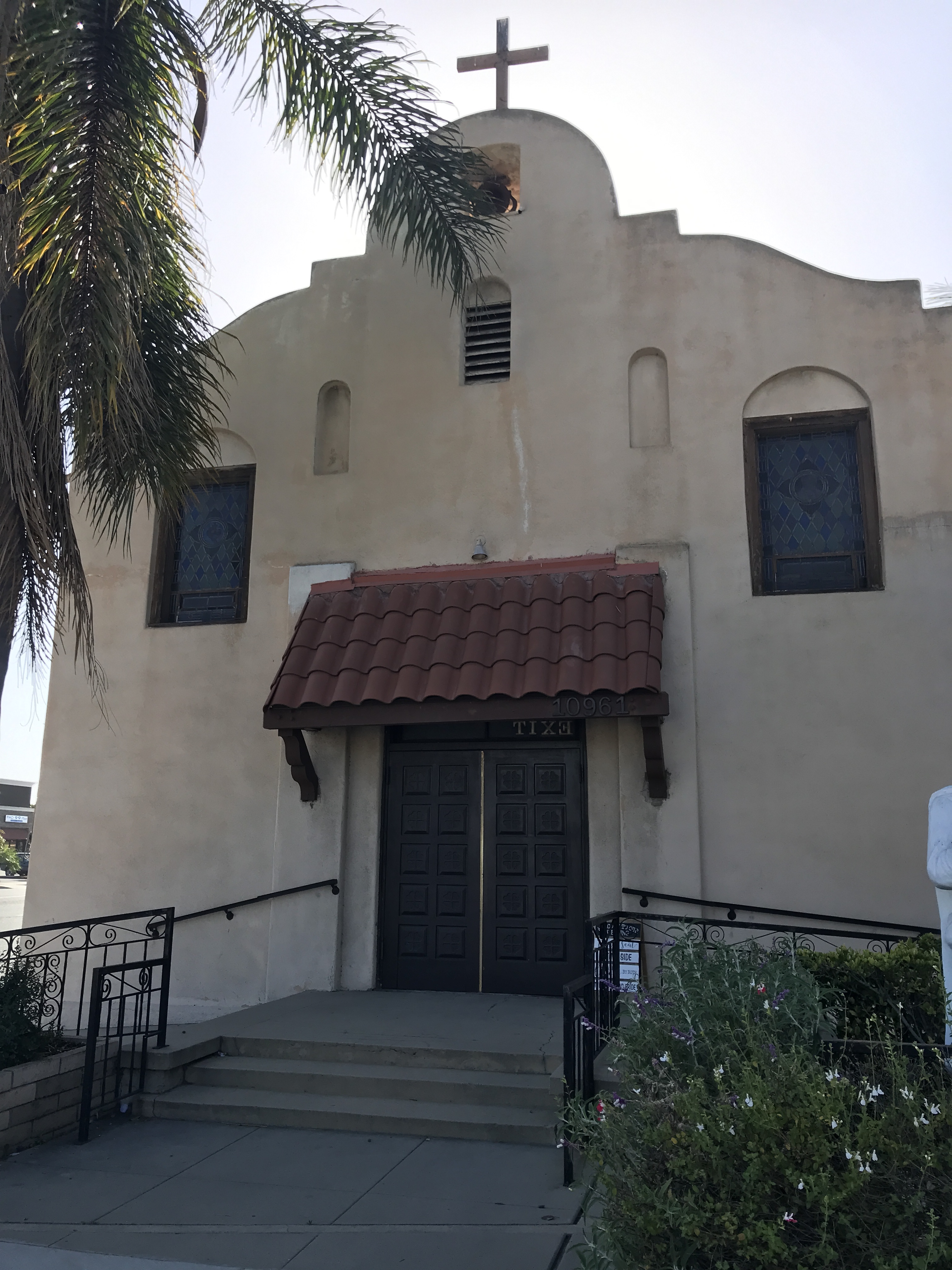
- The church in 2022

- Location within California Location within the United States
- Location: 10961 Reagan St, Los Alamitos, CA 90720
- Coordinates: 33.8033°N 118.0696°W
- Area: 1,871 sq ft (173.8 m^{2})
- Built: 1933
- Architectural style: Mission Revivial
- Website: stisidorehistoricalplaza.org
- NRHP reference No.: 100007440
- Added to NRHP: February 11, 2022

St. Isidore Catholic Church, is a historic church in Los Alamitos, California. It is the oldest building in the city and one of the oldest in Orange County, being built in 1933. It has not held services since 1999, and is planned to be a part of an upcoming community center. It is listed on the National Register of Historic Places.

== History ==
St. Isidore Parish was established in 1921, the same year as Holy Family in Orange and St. Anne in Seal Beach. Before 1921, only five parishes had been established in Orange County. Citizens of Los Alamitos had to use the general store or hotel for mass services before the opening of the church. In 1922, parishioners asked the Bixby Land Company for land to build a church. The company granted permission, and the building was built in 1926, under the leadership of Mike Reagan. It was named after Isidore the Laborer and its first pastor was Miguel Santacana. The church was damaged in the 1933 Long Beach earthquake and had to be rebuilt, reopening in 1935.

In the late 1930s and early 40s, ten stained glass windows were added to the church. They were all installed separately after each funding goal was reached. Some donors' names still can be found on the windows of the church as of 2024. A small rectory and garage were also built in 1938, but it was demolished in 1972. In the 1940s, Fr. McFadden organized the building of the parish hall, constructed by parishioners and referred to as "The People's Hall." It was used for religious education classes.

In 1960, St. Hedwig opened in the city, causing it to have two churches. Fr. Dominic Daley, the pastor of St. Isidore, thought that two churches would cause a financial loss, so he ordered that the church be closed. It was gutted as well, leading to the removal of many items in the church — the only original items left in 2024 from before the church's closure are the stained glass windows.

St. Isidore was reopened in 1972, after Fr. Quinn arrived at St. Hedwig. He was affectionate toward the Hispanic parishioners and held mass there in English and Spanish. However, it was closed again by the Roman Catholic Diocese of Orange in 1999, citing a lack of Spanish-speaking priests and the need to add expensive earthquake prevention measures to the church. The building did not fit many people either, with a maximum capacity of 125. Its last service was held on September 26, 1999.

Following fundraising, the church was bought by the St. Isidore Historical Plaza Organization, a volunteer community service group, in April 2014. Their goal was to restore the chapel and its surrounding buildings and gift it to the City of Los Alamitos for use as a community center, due to its proximity to the center of the city. Restoration of the chapel started immediately after the purchase and finished in the same month. Other buildings are still in need of restoration as of 2024. The church was added to the National Register of Historic Places on February 11, 2022.

== Features ==
Some elements used in the building of the church include "plastered walls, wood beams, wrought iron accents and ceramic tiles." The altar, made from Belgian marble, had marble statues on each side. Many church items, including the altar, were removed from the church following its closure in 1960. When the church reopened, a new altar was made from wood. Its foundation is made from wooden posts on concrete footings, the walls are stucco, and the roof is from terracotta.
