= Paderborn Baskets =

Gartenzaun24 Baskets Paderborn
- Nickname: Baskets
- Leagues: ProA
- Founded: 1969; 57 years ago
- History: List: VBC 69 Paderborn (1969–1991) Paderborn Baskets (91) (1991–1992, 2001–2004, 2006–2007, 2008–2010) BOVA Baskets (1992–1993) Forbo Paderborn 91 (1993–1998) Teamwork Paderborn 91 (1998–2001) Schröno Paderborn Baskets (2004–2006) Digibu Baskets (2007–2008) webmoebel Baskets (2010–2012) Finke Baskets (2012–2016) Uni Baskets Paderborn (2016–2023) Gartenzaun24 Baskets Paderborn (2023–present)
- Arena: Sportzentrum Maspernplatz
- Capacity: 3,014
- Location: Paderborn, Germany
- Team colors: Crimson, OrangeRed, Navy and White
- President: Jordi Perez
- Head coach: Miloš Stanković
- Team captain: Grant Teichmann
- Website: www.paderborn-baskets.de
Home	Away

Paderborn Baskets 91 e.V., for sponsorship reasons named Gartenzaun24 Baskets Paderborn, is a basketball club based in Paderborn, Germany. The club currently plays in the ProA, the second highest basketball league in Germany.

The club reached the 2008–09 Basketball Bundesliga playoffs where Paderborn earned two victories against the defending champion ALBA Berlin against all odds. It has been Paderborn's main accomplishment to date.

== History ==
The immediate predecessor club of the Paderborn Baskets was the VBC 69 Paderborn, founded in 1969, in which competitive basketball was also played in the city for the first time. After only six years, youth teams were able to win championships in the West German Basketball Association (WBV) in 1975, and subsequently youth and junior national players such as Manfred Winter and Bernd Zengerling came forth, who later played in the Basketball Bundesliga and the ProA predecessor leagues. Then in 1984, the first men's team itself succeeded in advancing to the 2nd Basketball Bundesliga Group North. The promotion team mainly included players from the team's own youth, such as Dirk Happe, who had won a bronze medal as a youth national player at the European Cadet (U16) Championships in his own country the year before.

Players of the Basketball Bundesliga Play–off team in 2009 included: Kendale Mccullum, Ryan Logan, Thomas Reuter, Martin Seiferth, Ivan Buntic, Demetrius Ward, Henning Ballhausen, Jens Großmann, Grant Benzinger, Daniel Mixich, Lavelle Felton, Piet Kahl and Jacksons Trapp.

== Current roster ==
Note: Flags indicate national team eligibility at FIBA-sanctioned events. Players may hold other non-FIBA nationalities not displayed.

Paderborn Baskets roster
Players
Coaches

Pos.	No.	Nat.	Name
PG	0	(United States)	Fugett, Jon’il	1.83 m (6 ft 0 in)	85 kg (187 lb)	26 – 28 November 1999
PF	1	(Netherlands)	Ugbo, Emmanuel	2.02 m (6 ft 8 in)	110 kg (243 lb)	23 – 14 April 2003
C	3	(United States)	Spinoso, Nick	2.06 m (6 ft 9 in)	111 kg (245 lb)	24 – 13 October 2002
SG	5	(Germany)	Šilić, Matej	1.88 m (6 ft 2 in)	82 kg (181 lb)	23 – 26 April 2003
SG	9	(Germany)	Schlipf, Nik	1.95 m (6 ft 5 in)	88 kg (194 lb)	24 – 9 August 2002
SG	10	(Germany)	Decker, Nicolas	1.90 m (6 ft 3 in)	84 kg (185 lb)	21 – 28 February 2005
C	11	(Germany)	Frischemeier, Hannes	2.02 m (6 ft 8 in)	93 kg (205 lb)	17 – 15 July 2009
G	12	(Germany)	Koyutürk, Levy	1.88 m (6 ft 2 in)	75 kg (165 lb)	17 – 5 February 2009
F	13	(Germany)	Schultz, Christopher	1.95 m (6 ft 5 in)	100 kg (220 lb)	23 – 21 September 2003
PG	24	(United States)	Worku, Eyassu (C)	1.88 m (6 ft 2 in)	79 kg (174 lb)	28 – 18 October 1998
C	26	(Germany)	Kröger, Leonard	2.05 m (6 ft 9 in)	101 kg (223 lb)	17 – 2 December 2008
G	31	(Germany)	Kollmar, Kevin	1.89 m (6 ft 2 in)	86 kg (190 lb)	24 – 7 April 2002

Head coach

- (Serbia) Miloš Stanković

Assistant coach(es)

- (France) Yuri Dimitri
- (Germany) Florian Held

Legend

- (C) Team captain
- Injured

- Roster
Updated: November 17, 2026

== Head coaches ==
Former team logo

- (Belgium) Werner Rotsaert (1992–1995)
- (United States) Ed Visscher (1995–1996)
- (United States) (Germany) Pat Elzie (1996–1999)
- (Belgium) Werner Rotsaert (1999–2000)
- (Iran) Nima Mehrdadi (2000–2001)
- (United States) (Germany) Doug Spradley (2001–2009)
- (United States) Steven Esterkamp (2019–2024)
- (Serbia) Miloš Stanković (2024–present)

== Players ==
=== Notable players ===
To appear in this section a player must have either:

- Set a club record or won an individual award as a professional player.
- Played at least one official international match for his senior national team at any time.

- (Germany) Stefano Garris
- (Canada) Connor Wood
- (United States) Louis Campbell
- (United States) Chris Ensminger
- (United States) Jamar Diggs
- (United States) Teddy Gipson
- (United States) Ryan Logan
- (United States) Kendale McCullum
