= Sportzentrum Maspernplatz =

Indoor sporting arena in Paderborn, Germany

Coordinates: 51.7246°N 8.75294°E

Sportzentrum Maspernplatz is an indoor sporting arena located in Paderborn, Germany. The capacity of the arena is 3,040 people. It is currently home to the Paderborn Baskets basketball team.
