= Fish-Baughman House =

- U.S. National Register of Historic Places
- The Fish-Baughman House in 2026

- Location within Utah Location within the United States
- Location: 3436 E. Ranch View Dr., Millcreek, Utah
- Coordinates: 40°40′45″N 111°47′50″W
- Area: .20 acres (0.081 ha)
- Built: 1955
- Architect: Cliff May and Chris Choate
- MPS: Historic Resource of Mount Olympus-Mill Creek Community, Salt Lake County, UT 1918-1969 MPS
- NRHP reference No.: 16000420
- Added to NRHP: June 28, 2016

The Fish-Baughman House is a one-story, frame, California Ranch-style house at 3436 E. Ranch View Dr. in Millcreek, Utah. It was built in 1955 and was listed on the National Register of Historic Places in 2016.

It was partly a pre-fabricated structure and was deemed significant "for its association with the architects Cliff May and Chris Choate, and the Cliff May Homes phenomenon of the mid-1950s."

The listing includes a second contributing building.
