= Tim Carey (American football) =

American football player (born 1975)

Profile
- Position: Quarterback

Personal information
- Born: February 20, 1975 (age 51); Los Alamitos, California, U.S.
- Listed weight: 210 lb (95 kg)

Career information
- High school: Los Alamitos (California)
- College: Hawaii
- NFL draft: 1998: undrafted

Career history
- Hawaii Hammerheads (1999); New England Sea Wolves (2000); Chicago Rush (2001–2002); Buffalo Destroyers (2002–2003)

Career AFL statistics
- Comp. / Att.: 207 / 363
- Passing yards: 2,606
- TD–INT: 46–12
- QB rating: 97.42
- Rushing TDs: 1
- Stats at ArenaFan.com

Tim Carey (born February 20, 1975) is an American former professional football quarterback who played four seasons in the Arena Football League (AFL) with the New England Sea Wolves, Chicago Rush and Buffalo Destroyers. He played college football at Stanford and Hawaii.

== Early life ==
Carey played high school football for the Los Alamitos High School Griffins of Los Alamitos, California. He recorded 3,397 passing yards his senior season.

== College career ==
Carey was a member of the Stanford Cardinal football team of Stanford University from 1993 to 1995. He transferred to play for the Hawaii Rainbow Warriors of the University of Hawaii at Manoa from 1996 to 1997.

== Professional career ==
Carey played for the Hawaii Hammerheads of the Indoor Professional Football League in 1999.

Carey signed with the AFL's New England Sea Wolves on March 13, 2000. He played for the Chicago Rush of the AFL from 2001 to 2002. He signed with the Buffalo Destroyers of the AFL on November 27, 2002.
