= Cliff May Experimental House =

House in Los Angeles, California, US

Coordinates: 34.067932°N 118.503700°W

The Cliff May Experimental House was built by Cliff May in the early 1950s as his family's fourth house and developed to push his ideas of "bringing the outdoors in" and open interior planning. The one-story, 1800-sf house is a simple rectangle in plan with a 288-square foot open skylight in the center. May's family of five created different rooms by using movable partitions. The family resided in the home for two years, while May determined how the sizeable skylight and open plan functioned for the residents there. From this experience, the home "Mandalay" was designed by May, which became the last home for his family.

This house is located at 1831 Old Ranch Road in the Riviera Ranch neighborhood of Los Angeles. The house is located behind a locked gate and is not publicly accessible. Thomas D. Church & Associates, Landscape Architects. Peggy Galloway, Interior Designer. It was recognized as a City of Los Angeles Historic Cultural Landmark in 2002. In 2007, design firm Marmol Radziner restored the historic home, re-establishing the open floor plan, replacing the roof, and bringing the home up to current code. The firm also provided landscape design and interior design services.
