= Los Alamitos Unified School District =

School district in California

Address
- 10293 Bloomfield Street Los Alamitos, California, 90720; United States

District information
- Type: Public
- Grades: K–12
- NCES District ID: 0622590

Students and staff
- Students: 9,317
- Teachers: 366.3
- Staff: 382.48
- Student–teacher ratio: 25.44

Other information
- Website: www.losal.org

Los Alamitos Unified School District (LAUSD) is a school district in Los Alamitos, Orange County, California. The school district area includes the communities of Los Alamitos, Rossmoor, Seal Beach, and Surfside. It also includes portions of Cypress. It also includes an area with a Long Beach street address.

== History ==
The Los Alamitos Unified School District was founded in June 1979 after the voters passed a unification referendum breaking the secondary schools away from the Anaheim Union High School District. One of the cochairman of the unification committee was elected to the board (See Mark Abrams) along with three Members of the Board of the then existing Los Alamitos Elementary school district. One of the newly elected members of the new school board was Mark Abrams, a student at Los Alamitos High School and 18 years old. He is considered the youngest elected official in the history of the United States, being elected just three months after his 18th birthday. He was also a current member of the student body and wound up eventually signing his own high school diploma.

Around 1987, Los Alamitos began a day care program from 6:30 AM to 6:00 PM for 24 students who were enrolled in Los Alamitos elementary school. By 1993 the day care program served 800 children in grades Kindergarten through 8. The price was $2.50 per hour per child, with each child serving a weekly minimum of 10 hours. This price was lower than that of an average private program, which would charge $300 per month per child. The childcare program was entirely self-supported by the fees paid by parents. Shirley Horn, a former Los Alamitos teacher and principal who had become a consultant, designed the program, which offered activities including arts instruction, computer training, homework assistance, and after-school recreation.

In 1993, several parents within the nearby Long Beach Unified School District (LBUSD) boundaries enrolled their children in the Los Alamitos day care program so that they could then use LBUSD district transfer rules, stating that parents may enroll their children at a school closest to their daycare provider even if the school is in another school district, to obtain an inter-district transfer from the Los Alamitos district and send their children to Los Alamitos schools. As a result, LBUSD was losing money, because state education funds were paid based on attendance. Horn said "It was never anyone's intention to make the (child-care) program a drawing card from other school districts. It did turn out that way." Gordon Dillow of the Los Angeles Times said "Although school officials say they do not track the racial make-up of their inter-district transfer students, the perception has been that many, perhaps most, of the Long Beach-to-Los Alamitos transfer students are Anglo." Whites were a minority in LBUSD, with 26% of the student body, while they were a majority at Los Alamitos USD, with 75% of the student body. LBUSD established its own afterschool programs so that parents could no longer use the loophole.

== Demographics ==
In the 1992-1993 school year the district schools were about 75% White. During that school year, the Los Alamitos district had about 1,200 students from other school districts. 400 of them lived in the Long Beach Unified School District. Some students had parents working in the Los Alamitos district, and some attended the Los Alamitos daycare in order to go to Los Alamitos schools.

By 2020, the demographics of the district had changed dramatically to include students identifying themselves as White (43%), Hispanic (27%), Asian(14%), and two or more races (8.8%)

== Superintendents ==
- Andrew Pulver (2019 - Current)
- Sherry Kropp (2011 - 2019)
- Greg Franklin (2007 - 2011)
- Carol Hart (1990 - 2007)

== Schools ==
=== Secondary schools ===
High schools:

- Los Alamitos High School (traditional high school)

Middle schools:

- Sharon Christa McAuliffe Middle School
- Oak Middle School

=== Primary schools ===
- Hopkinson Elementary School
- Lee Elementary School
- Los Alamitos Elementary School
- McGaugh Elementary School
- Rossmoor Elementary School
- Jack L. Weaver Elementary School

== Awards ==
=== California Department of Education - California Distinguished Schools ===
- Hopkinson Elementary School - 1993, 2000, 2008, 2014
- Lee Elementary School - 1995, 2004, 2018
- Los Alamitos Elementary School - 1993, 1997
- McGaugh Elementary School - 1992, 1997, 2000, 2004, 2014
- Rossmoor Elementary School - 1987, 1995, 2002, 2008, 2012, 2018
- Weaver Elementary School - 2002, 2006, 2010, 2014, 2018
- McAuliffe Middle School - 1996, 2003, 2009
- Oak Middle School - 2001, 2005, 2009
- Los Alamitos High School - 1988, 1994, 1998, 2009

=== California Department of Education - California Gold Ribbon Schools ===
- Hopkinson Elementary School
- Lee Elementary School
- Los Alamitos Elementary School
- McGaugh Elementary School
- Rossmoor Elementary School
- Weaver Elementary School
- McAuliffe Middle School
- Oak Middle School
- Los Alamitos High School

=== United States Department of Education - National Blue Ribbon Schools ===
- Hopkinson Elementary School - 2001, 2016
- Lee Elementary School - 2001, 2021
- Los Alamitos Elementary School - 2001, 2021
- Rossmoor Elementary School - 1997, 2003, 2014
- Weaver Elementary School - 2004, 2017
- Oak Middle School - 2002, 2006
- McAuliffe Middle School - 2012
- Los Alamitos High School - 1990, 1994, 1998, with Special Honors in Arts Education - 1989, 1993, 1998
