= Western Holly =

Western Stove Company
- Company type: Defunct
- Industry: Appliance
- Founded: 1920
- Fate: closed down: early 1960s (approx.)
- Headquarters: Culver City, California, United States
- Products: gas ranges, electric ranges, built-in gas cooktops and ovens

The Western Holly (sometimes written Western-Holly) stove was a brand manufactured by Western Stove in Culver City, California, which later became part of Rheem. Gas ranges and stand-alone ovens marketed under the Western-Holly brand were particularly popular in Southern California from the 1920s to the 1950s.

== History ==
Western Stove opened its factory in Culver City in 1922. By 1947 Western Stove employed 720 employees on 11 acres, a significant increase from its beginnings in two small buildings with just 20 employees. By 1947, it sold its appliances in eleven Western states, expanding to Texas by opening an office in May of that year. It 1948 it acquired the Bluebonnet Ordnance plant near McGregor, Texas and converted it into a factory for gas ranges. The company then had facilities in both California and Texas.

Rheem purchased stovemaker Western Holly in 1956. It then sold the brand in 1958.

== Features ==
Many Western Holly stoves feature porthole circular windows for their ovens, as opposed to the traditional rectangular shape.

== Popularity ==
In 1952, the Western Holly stove received a design and color award.

== See also ==
- List of stoves
