= Cliff May =

American architect (1903–1989)

- Born: 1906; San Diego, California
- Died: 1989 (aged 82–83); Los Angeles
- Occupation: Architect
- Buildings: California Ranch-style modern house

Cliff May (1903–1989) was a building designer (he was not licensed as an architect until the last year of his life) practicing in California best known and remembered for developing the suburban Post-war "dream home" (California Ranch House), and the Mid-century Modern

== The Ranch-style house ==
Interior of a mid-century ranch-style house designed by Cliff May, c. 1960s

May built Monterey-style furniture as a young man. As a residential/building designer, May designed projects throughout Southern California, including the regions around Los Angeles, San Diego, and Santa Barbara, California. He is credited with creating the pitched-roof, low-slung California Ranch-style house in 1932. He had very little training as an architect. May never formally registered for an architectural license, but obtained one in 1988, one year before his death, when California's governor granted licenses to all registered designers in the state.

During his career, May designed over a thousand custom residences; numerous commercial structures; and from model house prototypes, more than eighteen thousand tract houses had his imprint. May synthesized Spanish Colonial Revival architecture with abstracted California adobe ranchos and Modern architecture. Robert Mondavi chose May to design his winery in which he incorporated features found in construction of California Missions.

In 1932, May's first house sold for $9,500. His work drew attention and the second home he built was featured in Architectural Digest in 1934. He continued to build 50 additional houses in San Diego before moving to Los Angeles in 1935. Many of his 1,000+ houses were built in Southern California, however some were built as far away as Switzerland, Australia and Ireland. During the 1940s and 50s, his work was featured in many publications including Architectural Forum, American Home, California arts and Architecture, Architectural Digest, House Beautiful, Sunset Magazine, Modernism Magazine, Southern California Quarterly, among others.

During the 1950s, May, along with colleague Chris Choate, designed prefabricated tract ranch homes which they sold to builders across the US. Many of these prefab tracts like Rancho Estates in Long Beach were popular and resulted in many homes in the tracts being built and sold. Some, particularly those outside of California, were unprofitable and only resulted in the model homes being built. The partnership between May and Choate ended in 1956 with May's departure.

May said of his architecture, "The ranch house was everything a California house should be -it had cross-ventilation, the floor was level with the ground, and with its courtyard and the exterior corridor, it was about sunshine and informal outdoor living."

The HGTV television show Flip or Flop featured remodels of two Cliff May homes.

== Projects ==
Selected works include:

- O'Leary House (1932), San Diego, California
- Lindstrom House (1933), San Diego, California, (National Register of Historic Places)
- Sheldon Hodge House (1933), San Diego, California, destroyed by gas explosion in the 1970s
- Porterfield Beardsley House (1933), San Diego, California, (May's first commissioned house)
- Highland House (1934), San Diego, California, (listed on the City of San Diego's Historic Register)
- Whalen House (1935), in Bonita, California
- Tucker House (1936), in San Diego, California
- Hacienda Ranch House (1936), in San Diego, California
- Smith House (1936), in La Habra Heights, California
- Oakmont House (1939), in Brentwood Park, Los Angeles, California
- House Beautiful's Pacesetter House (1947), in Los Angeles, California
- Sullivan Canyon Ranches (c.1941-1948), in Los Angeles, California
- Prefab House (1951), in Phoenix, Arizona
- Sunset Magazine headquarters (1951), in Menlo Park, California
- Cliff May Experimental House (1952), in Los Angeles, California
- Tanglewood House (1952), in Lubbock, Texas
- Rancho Rinconada (April 1953) present eastern Cupertino, California - Cliff May pre-fab subdivision of "around 900 homes (per May) (built with Stern & Price)
- Lakewood Rancho Estates (700+ homes) (1953-1954), in Long Beach, California
- Prefab Homes (1954), in Tucson, Arizona
- Lakewood Prefab Homes (1954), in Lakewood, Washington
- Casa View Oaks Prefab Homes (1954-1955), in Dallas, Texas
- Charleston Heights Prefab Homes (1954-1955), in Las Vegas, Nevada
- Harvey Park Prefab Homes (1955), in Denver, Colorado
- 2 Prefab Homes (1955), in Odessa, Texas
- Cherokee Village Prefab Houses (1955), in Cherokee Village, Arkansas
- Castle Hills Prefab Homes (1955), in San Antonio, Texas
- Maywood Hills Prefab Homes (1955), in Salt Lake City, Utah
- Fish-Baughman House (1955), in Millcreek, Utah, listed on the National Register of Historic Places in 2016
- Cliff May House "Mandalay" (1955), in Brentwood, Los Angeles, California
- Cliff May pre-fab homes (9) in Medford, Oregon. (with J.T. Hight builders)
- Cliff May prefab homes - (1956) Santa Maria, California (with builder George Pabst)
- Overdale House (1956), in Columbus, Ohio
- Vientos House (1963), in Camarillo, California
- Ocotillo House (1963), in Tucson, Arizona
- Oxblow House (1968), in Solvang, California
- Private Residence (1969), in Phoenix, Arizona
- Charles House (1973), in Fresno, California
- El Vuelo House (1973), in Rancho Santa Fe, California
- Gerald Katell House (1978), in Rolling Hills, California
- Cliff May tract-housing (79 units, 1956), Westridge Manor, Bishop, California (with Marburt Homes, Inc.)
- Bell Canyon, California 1970’s Equestrian Center, Community Center, Custom Home.

https://pin.it/3Q3jsrA4q

== Personal life ==
May grew up in San Diego, California. On his mother's side he is related to Jose Antonio Estudillo, one of the founders of San Diego. His father's side of the family held a lifetime lease on the old Los Flores Rancho in San Diego County. May lived in his 10,000 square foot "ultimate ranch house" located on a 15-acre site in one of the canyons in the Santa Monica Mountains near Brentwood. May was a record collector and amateur saxophone player and piano player; his home had a sound system that piped-in music to every indoor and outdoor space.

May was also a pilot; he made many trips in his plane to Mexico during his lifetime.

== Death ==
May died in 1989 at the age of 83, at his estate "Mandalay" in Sullivan Canyon in the Brentwood neighborhood of Los Angeles, California.

== Legacy ==
In 2012, the UC Santa Barbara Art, Design & Architecture Museum and the organization Pacific Standard Time mounted a retrospective exhibition, Carefree California: Cliff May and the Romance of the Ranch, 1920-1960. Several books have been published about his work, including the 2008 Rizzoli publication, Cliff May and the Modern Ranch House.

An archive of Cliff May's papers, c. 1931–1989, consisting of 350 linear feet of papers, correspondence, clippings, photographs and ephermera is held in the Architecture and Design Collection of the Art, Design & Architecture Museum at the University Santa Barbara.

== See also ==
- Cliff May Experimental House
