= Rossmoor, California =

- Census-designated place
- Interactive map of Rossmoor, California
- Location in California Location in the United States
- Coordinates: 33°47′20″N 118°4′47″W
- Country: United States
- State: California
- County: Orange
- Established: 1955
- Named for: Ross W. Cortese

Area
  - Total: 1.559 sq mi (4.039 km^{2})
  - Land: 1.559 sq mi (4.039 km^{2})
  - Water: 0 sq mi (0 km^{2}) 0%
- Elevation: 13 ft (4 m)

Population (2020)
  - Total: 10,625
  - Density: 6,813/sq mi (2,631/km^{2})
- Time zone: UTC-8 (PST)
  - Summer (DST): UTC-7 (PDT)
- ZIP code: 90720
- Area code: 562
- FIPS code: 06-63050
- GNIS feature ID: 1661336

Rossmoor is a planned census-designated place located in Orange County, California, United States. As of the 2020 census, the CDP had a total population of 10,625 up from the 2010 census population of 10,244. The gated Leisure World retirement community in the city of Seal Beach is to the south of Rossmoor, Los Alamitos is to the east and north, and Long Beach is to the west (on the other side of the San Gabriel River, the 605 freeway and the border with Los Angeles County). The community of Rossmoor has two shopping centers within its boundaries, but only one—the Rossmoor Village Square, is now within the political boundaries of Rossmoor. A larger shopping center, the Rossmoor Business Center, was annexed, despite many protests, by the City of Seal Beach in 1967. The Center has been remodeled several times and was renamed the Shops at Rossmoor in the early 2000s.

== History ==
The Rossmoor community was developed from 1955 through 1961 by Ross W. Cortese, who had earlier developed the architecturally-significant Lakewood Rancho Estates in Long Beach (1953) and the Frematic Homes (1954) in Anaheim, just north and west of Disneyland. Cortese filed his first subdivision map for Rossmoor on October 20, 1956, and filed his thirteenth and final map on March 21, 1960. Cortese's original partners in securing the first large parcels of land that would become Rossmoor included California governor Goodwin Knight and Judge Alfred Gittelson, who had also partnered with him in the Lakewood Rancho Estates and the Frematic homes. (It was Gittelson who later agreed to annex his Rossmoor Shopping Center property to Seal Beach in the late 1960s.) After Rossmoor, Cortese would construct the first of his very successful Leisure World gated retirement communities in that part of Seal Beach which is immediately south of Rossmoor. The Rossmoor community is easy to recognize because of its red brick "signature wall" that borders the entire unincorporated community. It is a signature of the Rossmoor community that differentiates it from neighboring cities Los Alamitos and Seal Beach. In 1990, the community approved a bond by a 55-45% vote to buy the closed down Benjamin Rush Elementary School and created Rush Park.

There are 3,430 single family homes, one apartment complex (Accent Apartment Homes, originally Rossmoor Manor on Wallingsford Road), and one town house complex (Rossmoor Town Houses with addresses at 12100 Montecito Road or 3342 Bradbury Road) within Rossmoor.

=== Annexation ===
According to a June 2006 consultant's report to the Rossmoor Planning Committee, the most cost effective solution for Rossmoor would be to be annexed by the city of Seal Beach.

Although it is not part of the city of Los Alamitos, it is served under the Los Alamitos "sphere of influence" and was proposed to be annexed to the city by 2007 after the Local Agency Formation Commission reviewed the proposal.

Another proposal would combine Rossmoor with adjacent Seal Beach and Los Alamitos to form one city.

Rossmoor is served by the Rossmoor/Los Alamitos Area Sewer District. The mainly residential area is also served by the Rossmoor Community Services District (CSD), which serves the community as an independent functionary does. The CSD provides services related to public recreation facilities and park development for Rush Park, Rossmoor Park, two mini parks and the Montecito Center. The CSD also administers street lighting, road rights-of-way services, and manages the street sweeping contract. However, the Rossmoor CSD cannot make decisions about the future of the community, which is all delegated to the County of Orange's Unincorporated Islands Program and the Orange County Board of Supervisors.

At the May 22, 2008 meeting, OC LAFCO recommended that the Rossmoor Incorporation Plan go to a vote of the community. A vote by residents on the issue of incorporation was held on November 4, 2008. The proposition for cityhood was resoundingly defeated by a vote of 28% to 72% indicating that the vast majority of residents desired not to be incorporated as a city. Residents also voted down three separate utility tax proposals by a wide margin.

On February 19, 2021, state Assemblymember Janet Nguyen introduced AB-1246 Community services districts, which would have made many "latent powers" available to the Rossmoor Community Services District (Rossmoor CSD). The bill died at the desk in February 2022, never being sent to committee.

== Geography ==
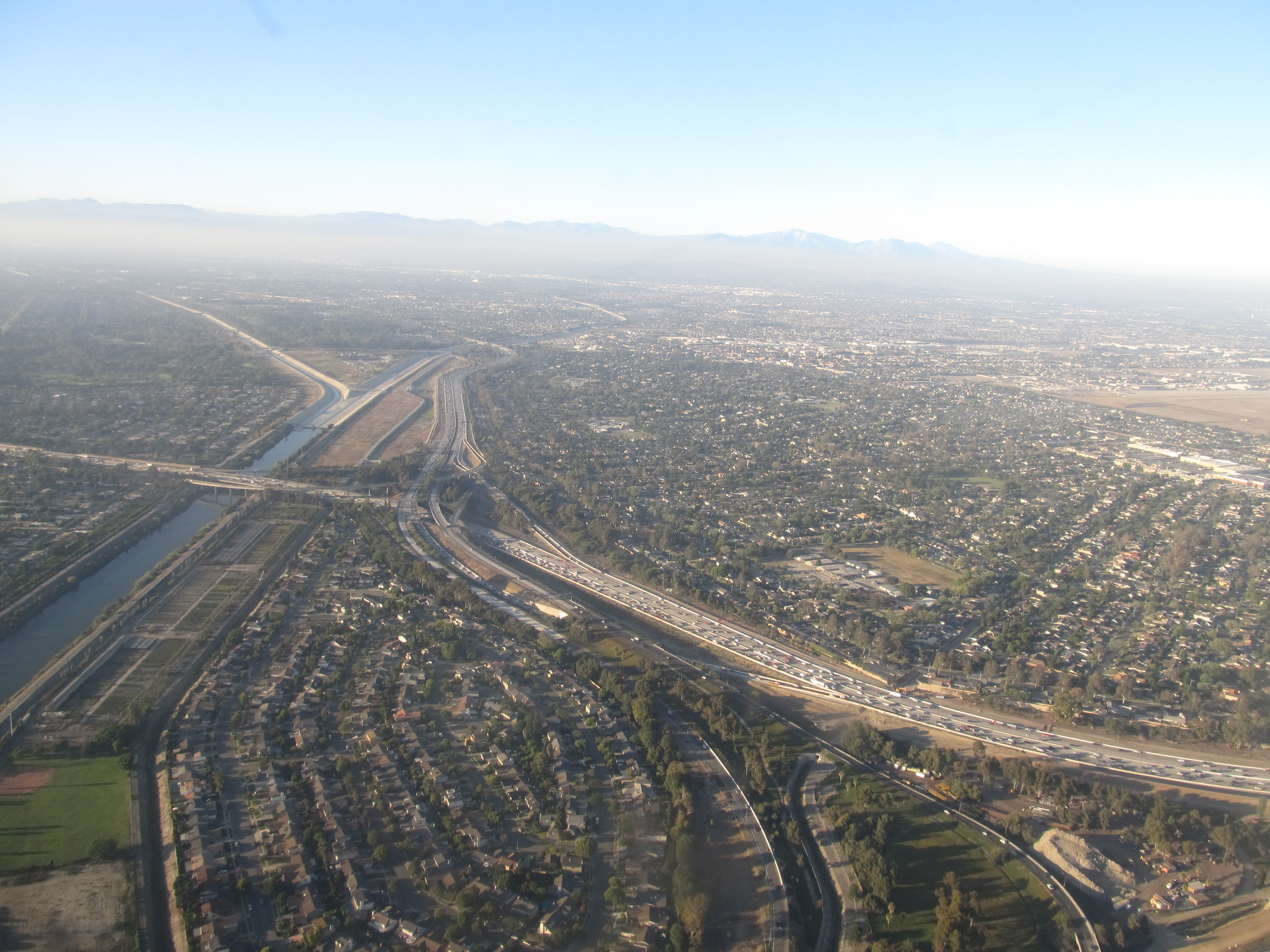
Rossmoor is east of where Coyote Creek meets the San Gabriel River, and northeast of the junction of Interstate 405, Interstate 605 and California State Route 22

Rossmoor is located at 33°47'20" North, 118°4'47" West (33.788917, -118.079721). It borders the cities of Los Alamitos and Seal Beach.

According to the United States Census Bureau, the CDP has a total area of 1.56 square miles (4.0 km^{2}), all land.

=== Climate ===
According to the Köppen Climate Classification system, Rossmoor has a semi-arid climate (abbreviated BSh) with Mediterranean characteristics.

== Demographics ==
Historical population
Census	Pop.	Note	%±
1970	12,922		—
1980	10,457		−19.1%
1990	9,893		−5.4%
2000	10,298		4.1%
2010	10,244		−0.5%
2020	10,625		3.7%
U.S. Decennial Census; 1850–1870 1880-1890; 1900 1910 1920; 1930 1940 1950; 1960 1970 1980; 1990 2000 2010; 2020

Rossmoor first appeared as an unincorporated community in the 1970 U.S. census; and as a census designated place in the 1980 United States census.

=== Racial and ethnic composition ===
Rossmoor CDP, California – Racial and ethnic composition Note: the US Census treats Hispanic/Latino as an ethnic category. This table excludes Latinos from the racial categories and assigns them to a separate category. Hispanics/Latinos may be of any race.
Race / Ethnicity (NH = Non-Hispanic)	Pop 1980	Pop 1990	Pop 2000	Pop 2010	Pop 2020	% 1980	% 1990	% 2000	% 2010	% 2020
White alone (NH)	9,892	8,906	8,662	7,845	6,623	94.60%	90.02%	84.11%	76.58%	62.33%
Black or African American alone (NH)	-	43	77	76	101	-	0.43%	0.75%	0.74%	0.95%
Native American or Alaska Native alone (NH)	15	41	29	29	12	0.14%	0.41%	0.28%	0.28%	0.11%
Asian alone (NH)	210	425	583	812	1,526	2.01%	4.30%	5.66%	7.93%	14.36%
Native Hawaiian or Pacific Islander alone (NH)	210	425	10	21	24	2.01%	4.30%	0.10%	0.20%	0.23%
Other race alone (NH)	46	1	22	7	30	0.44%	0.01%	0.21%	0.07%	0.28%
Mixed race or Multiracial (NH)	x	x	228	280	681	x	x	2.21%	2.73%	6.41%
Hispanic or Latino (any race)	294	477	687	1,174	1,628	2.81%	4.82%	6.67%	11.46%	15.32%
Total	10,457	9,893	10,298	10,244	10,625	100.00%	100.00%	100.00%	100.00%	100.00%

=== 2020 census ===
As of the 2020 census, Rossmoor had a population of 10,625. The population density was 6,815.3 inhabitants per square mile (2,631.4/km^{2}). The age distribution was 24.2% under the age of 18, 7.8% aged 18 to 24, 18.0% aged 25 to 44, 29.7% aged 45 to 64, and 20.4% who were 65 years of age or older. The median age was 45.1 years. For every 100 females, there were 94.2 males, and for every 100 females age 18 and over there were 92.5 males age 18 and over.

The census reported that 99.8% of the population lived in households, 0.2% lived in non-institutionalized group quarters, and no one was institutionalized. There were 3,632 households, out of which 37.5% included children under the age of 18. Of all households, 69.4% were married-couple households, 2.6% were cohabiting couple households, 18.1% had a female householder with no spouse or partner present, and 9.9% had a male householder with no spouse or partner present. About 14.6% of households were one-person households, and 9.8% had someone living alone who was 65 years of age or older. The average household size was 2.92, and there were 2,997 families (82.5% of all households).

There were 3,765 housing units at an average density of 2,415.0 units per square mile (932.4 units/km^{2}), of which 3,632 (96.5%) were occupied. Of these, 86.5% were owner-occupied and 13.5% were occupied by renters. The homeowner vacancy rate was 0.6% and the rental vacancy rate was 5.0%.

100.0% of residents lived in urban areas, while 0.0% lived in rural areas.

=== Income and poverty ===
In 2023, the US Census Bureau estimated that the median household income was $200,833, and the per capita income was $86,963. About 2.9% of families and 3.8% of the population were below the poverty line.

=== 2010 census ===
At the 2010 census Rossmoor had a population of 10,244. The population density was 6,660.6 inhabitants per square mile (2,571.7/km^{2}). The racial makeup of Rossmoor was 8,691 (84.8%) White (76.6% Non-Hispanic White), 84 (0.8%) African American, 36 (0.4%) Native American, 838 (8.2%) Asian, 29 (0.3%) Pacific Islander, 168 (1.6%) from other races, and 398 (3.9%) from two or more races. Hispanic or Latino of any race were 1,174 persons (11.5%).

The whole population lived in households, no one lived in non-institutionalized group quarters and no one was institutionalized.

There were 3,631 households, 1,382 (38.1%) had children under the age of 18 living in them, 2,456 (67.6%) were opposite-sex married couples living together, 326 (9.0%) had a female householder with no husband present, 138 (3.8%) had a male householder with no wife present. There were 90 (2.5%) unmarried opposite-sex partnerships, and 20 (0.6%) same-sex married couples or partnerships. 596 households (16.4%) were one person and 390 (10.7%) had someone living alone who was 65 or older. The average household size was 2.83. There were 2,920 families (80.4% of households); the average family size was 3.17.

The age distribution was 2,550 people (24.9%) under the age of 18, 738 people (7.2%) aged 18 to 24, 1,742 people (17.0%) aged 25 to 44, 3,444 people (33.6%) aged 45 to 64, and 1,770 people (17.3%) who were 65 or older. The median age was 45.5 years. For every 100 females, there were 92.4 males. For every 100 females age 18 and over, there were 90.0 males.

There were 3,710 housing units at an average density of 2,412.3 per square mile, of the occupied units 3,180 (87.6%) were owner-occupied and 451 (12.4%) were rented. The homeowner vacancy rate was 0.4%; the rental vacancy rate was 3.6%. 8,998 people (87.8% of the population) lived in owner-occupied housing units and 1,246 people (12.2%) lived in rental housing units.

According to the 2010 United States Census, Rossmoor had a median household income of $208,807, with 3.3% of the population living below the federal poverty line.

== Government ==
=== Politics ===
As of the 2020 redistricting, Rossmoor is in the 1st Supervisorial District in Orange County, represented by Republican Andrew Do. Because Rossmoor is an unincorporated area within Orange County, the Supervisor is the key local elected official.

In the state legislature Rossmoor is located in the 36th senatorial district, represented by Republican Tony Strickland, and in the 70th Assembly district, represented by Republican Tri Ta.

Federally, Rossmoor is located in California's 45th congressional district, which is represented by Democrat Derek Tran.

== Education ==
The Los Alamitos Unified School District serves Rossmoor. Four of the six elementary schools of the district, Rossmoor, Weaver, Lee, and Hopkinson, are located within the boundaries of Rossmoor.

== Notable people ==
- Frieda Rapoport Caplan, founder of Frieda's, a specialty produce company in Los Alamitos. She created the specialty produce industry in the United States and revolutionized the fresh produce industry.
- Landry Fields, former NBA basketball player for the New York Knicks and Toronto Raptors
- Johan Hultin, Swedish-American pathologist who helped sequence the 1918 influenza virus
- Rocco Grimaldi, hockey player for the Nashville Predators
- Malcolm Lucas, California Supreme Court Chief Justice (1987-1996)
- Joe Escalante, bassist and songwriter for punk rock band The Vandals
