= Los Alamitos, California =

City in California, United States

- City
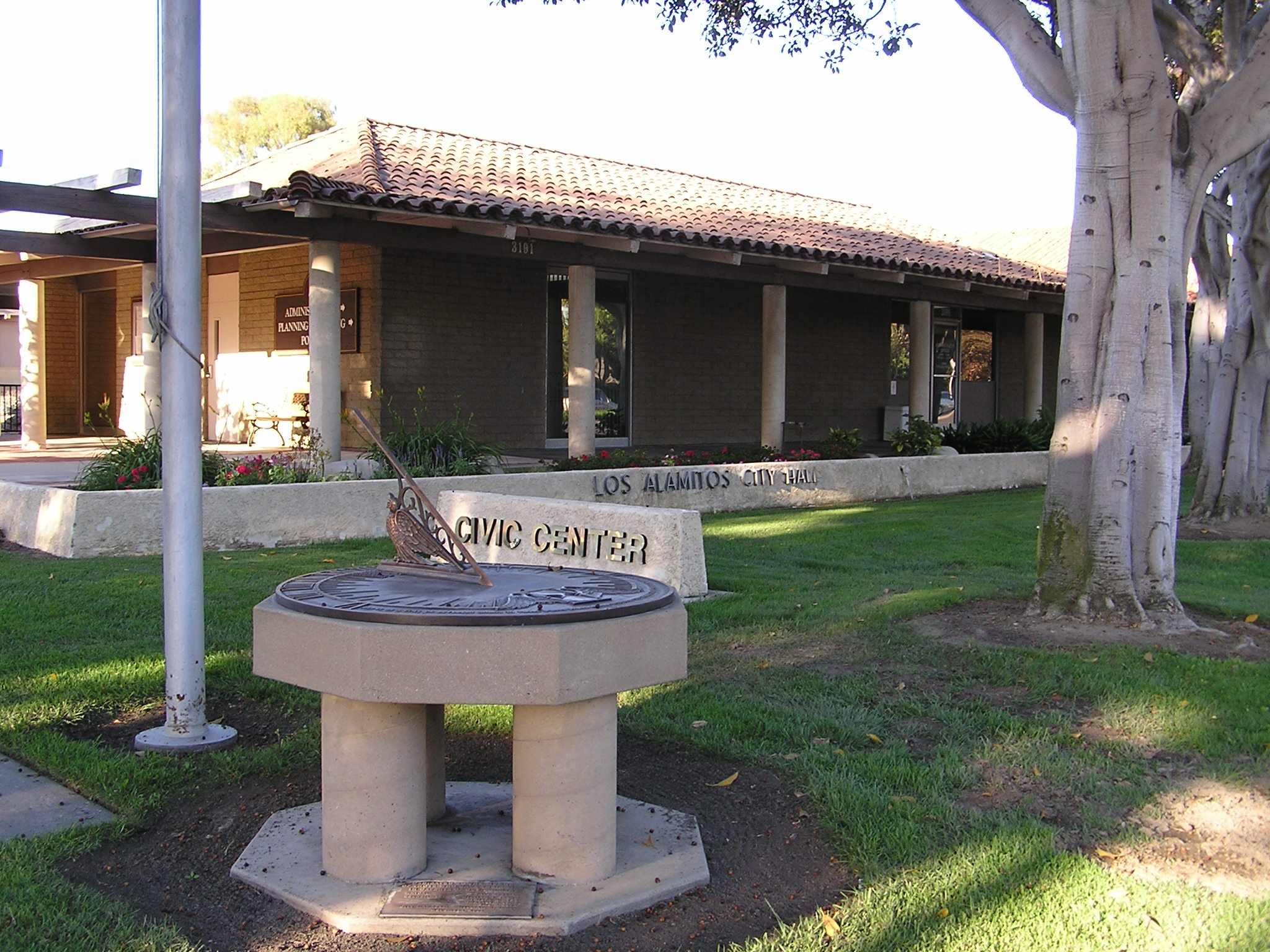
- City Hall

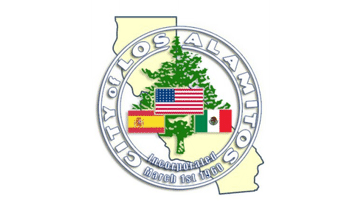
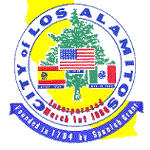
- Flag Seal
- Interactive map of Los Alamitos, California
- Location in the United States
- Coordinates: 33°48′8″N 118°3′52″W
- Country: United States
- State: California
- County: Orange
- Incorporated: March 1, 1960

Government
  - Type: Council-Manager
  - Mayor: Tanya Doby
  - Mayor Pro Tem: Jordan Nefulda
  - City council: Shelley Hasselbrink; Emily Hibard; Gary Loe
  - City Manager: Chet Simmons

Area
  - Total: 4.07 sq mi (10.55 km^{2})
  - Land: 4.01 sq mi (10.39 km^{2})
  - Water: 0.062 sq mi (0.16 km^{2}) 1.60%
- Elevation: 23 ft (7 m)

Population (2020)
  - Total: 11,780
  - Density: 2,936/sq mi (1,134/km^{2})
- Time zone: UTC-8 (PST)
  - Summer (DST): UTC-7 (PDT)
- ZIP Codes: 90720–90721
- Area code: 562
- FIPS code: 06-43224
- GNIS feature ID: 1652748
- Website: cityoflosalamitos.org

Los Alamitos (lohs AL-ə-MEE-tohs; Spanish for 'the little cottonwoods') is a city in Orange County, California, United States. It was incorporated in March 1960. Its population was 11,780 in the 2020 census, up from 11,449 in 2010. A significant part of the city is occupied by Joint Forces Training Base – Los Alamitos, and it hosts the USA Water Polo National Aquatic Center.

== History ==
The Tongva inhabited the area before the city was established, and Rancho Los Alamitos was known as the village of Puvunga. The area is still sacred to the Tongva people.

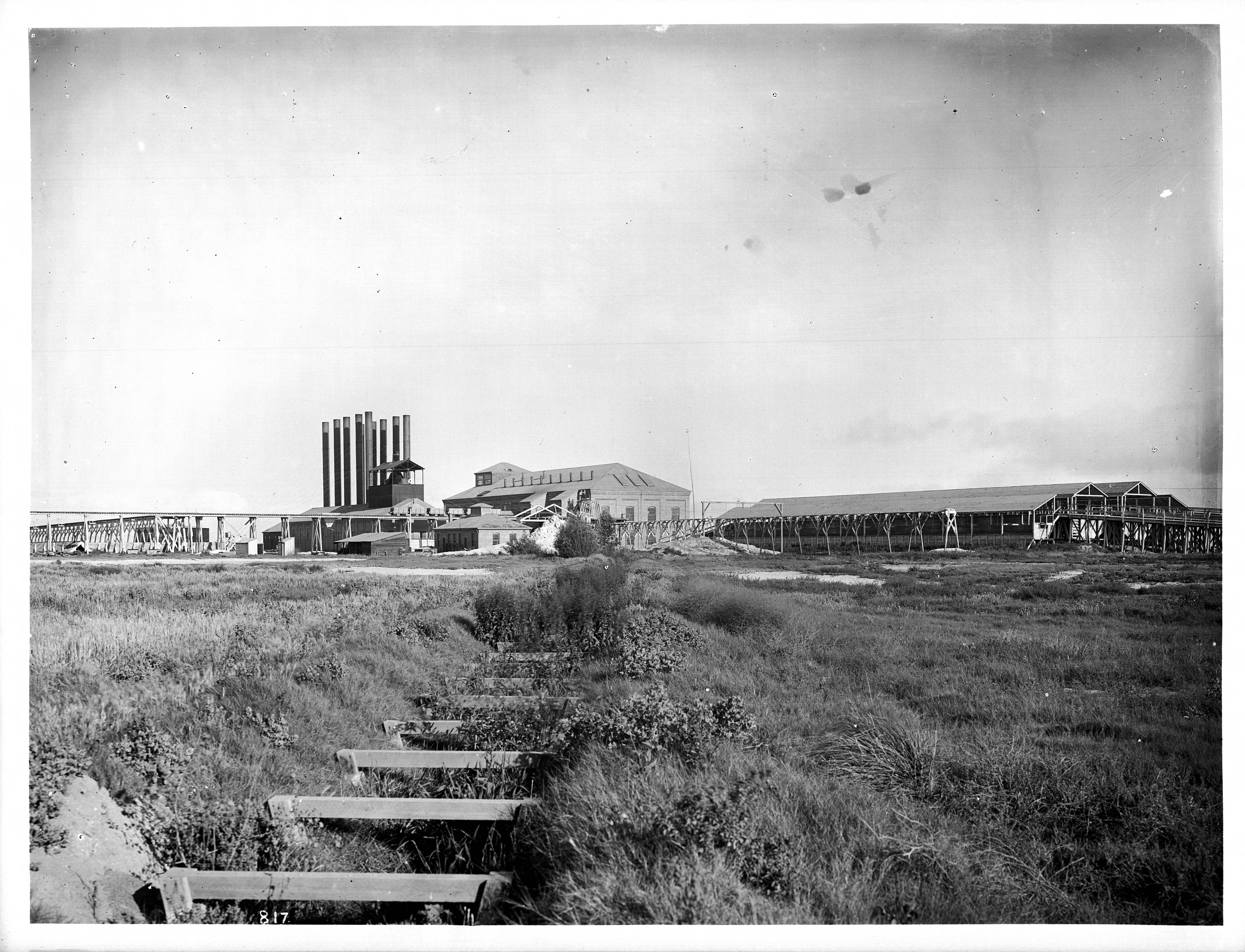
Sugar beet plant built by William A. Clark, near present-day Katella Avenue and Los Alamitos Boulevard, c. 1910

The town of Los Alamitos was established in 1896 by Lewellyn Bixby to support a new sugar-beet factory built by the Clark brothers. William Andrews Clark, a future Senator from Montana, had built his fortune in mining, banking and logging in that state. His younger brother, J. Ross Clark, managed their operations in California after he moved there for health reasons. Lewellyn Bixby, whose family owned the surrounding land on Rancho Los Cerritos and Rancho Los Alamitos, had been trying to build a sugar beet factory in that area for several years. Due to financial losses during the 1880s, he no longer had the money to build the factory complex on his own. Bixby had made a fortune in the 1850s when he and cousins Benjamin and Thomas Flint formed Flint, Bixby & Co. to deal in mutton and wool on Rancho San Justo, south of San Jose. After selling wool to the government during the Civil War, the Flints and Bixby bought land in southern California; this included the future Irvine Ranch and Rancho Los Cerritos, which is much of the western half of Long Beach. Flint, Bixby hired Lewellyn's younger brother, Jotham, to manage the Cerritos. When the company broke up, Lewellyn assumed their southern California properties, moved to Los Angeles and became the senior partner with Jotham.

Around 1881, cousin John W. Bixby wanted to purchase Rancho Los Alamitos with a consortium which included Lewellyn and Jotham and banker Isaias W. Hellman. When John died on May 7, 1887, the ranch was divided among the three families. The northern third, adjacent to the Rancho Los Cerritos (roughly north of present-day Orangewood Avenue), went to the Lewellyn-Jotham faction and became the Bixby Land Company. By the mid-1890s, after the crash following the 1880s land boom, this group was cash-poor and land-rich. After experimenting in northern California with sugar beets, the Bixbys agreed to provide the land and contracted with William A. Clark for capital; E.A. Dyer provided the expertise to build a sugar-beet factory. The community that grew up around the factory complex, with streets of company houses for workers and surrounding farms, was called Los Alamitos. During the early 1900s, sugar beets were delivered to a factory by horse and wagon. Economics, the elimination of a protective tariff, and a 1921 insect infestation reduced the sugar-beet crop in Orange County and ended the industry there and in Los Alamitos. William Clark and his brother H. Ross, who ran the Los Alamitos operation, received 1,000 acres (4.0 km^{2}) east of the factory and purchased 8,000 acres (32 km^{2}) north of the factory (primarily in Rancho Los Cerritos) which became Long Beach Airport, Long Beach City College, and the city of Lakewood. Clark and Hellman were also involved with E. H. Harriman, Henry Edwards Huntington, and the Southern Pacific Railroad in southern California; the Clarks completed a railroad from Los Angeles to Salt Lake City, with a desert stop in Las Vegas.

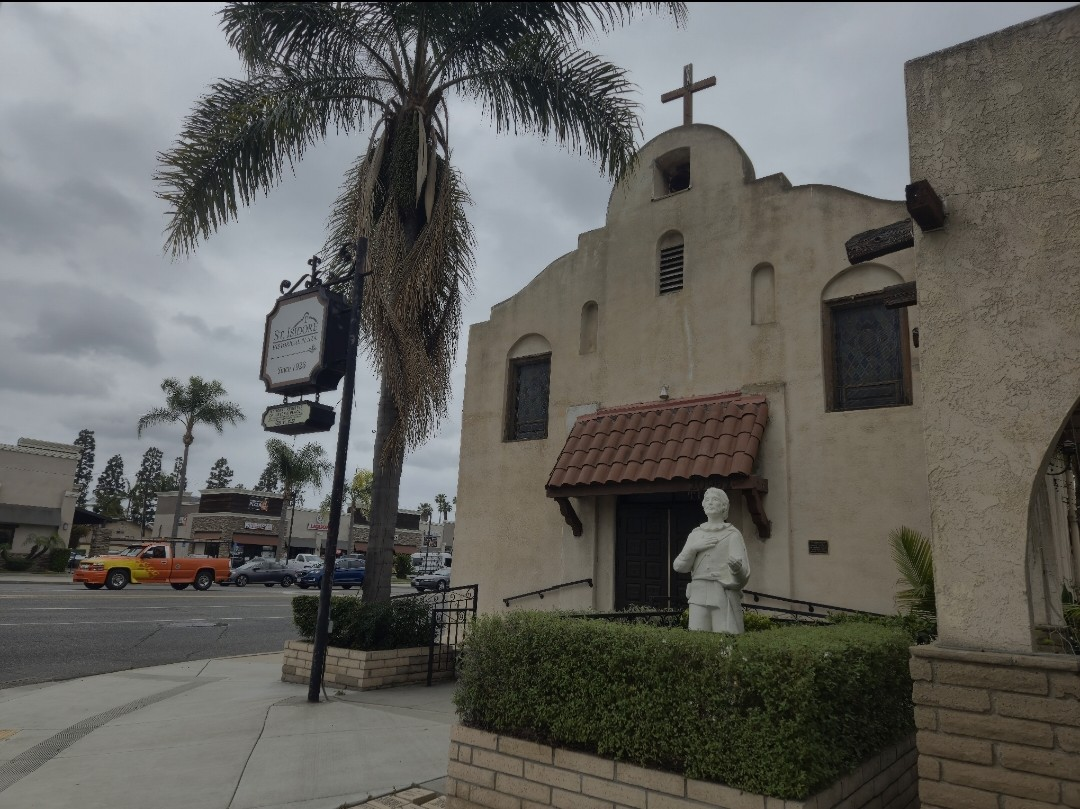
St. Isidore Historic Plaza, built in 1921

On land south of the factory (and present-day Orangewood Avenue), John Bixby's son Fred had a ranch to fatten cattle for slaughter and managed Hellman's land in present-day Seal Beach). Bixby allowed European-immigrant, Mexican, and Japanese farmers to rent land and grow crops. At the beginning of World War II, the Japanese farmers were rounded up by the military and relocated to internment camps in Manzanar and elsewhere.

Before and early in the war, the area around Los Alamitos became a center of the aircraft industry. The Clark heirs arranged for Donald Douglas to begin construction of the Douglas Aircraft Company plant north of the Long Beach airport, and the Navy needed an auxiliary airfield for its reserve training facility at the airport. A touch-and-go field was built on level ground east of Los Alamitos in August 1940, Orange County's first military post. In February 1941, the Navy moved its reserve aviation training from Long Beach and purchased 1,300 acres (5.3 km^{2}). Trainees and other troops began using the new facilities in November of that year, and Naval Reserve Air Base Long Beach moved its operations to NRAB Los Alamitos in May 1942. NRAB Los Alamitos was the nation's busiest reserve air base during the Korean War, but suburban residential development began to curtail its activity by the late 1950s. The Navy moved out in 1972, and the California National Guard took over management of the base as an Armed Forces Reserve Center the following year. It is a reserve support center for units of the Army, Navy, National Guard and Marines and home to other government agencies, including Homeland Security, FEMA and the State of California Office of Emergency Services.

Former military personnel remained in Los Alamitos after the war, living in neighborhoods such as Carrier Row (whose streets are named for World War II aircraft carriers,. Carrier Row was three small subdivisions, built in 1947–48, 1950, and 1955 by different builders. The first subdivision was Alamos Ranchos, first occupied in April 1948. The homes had sewage problems, and the builder stopped after completing the two blocks east of Lexington and south of Katella. In 1950, two more blocks were constructed as Plainview Homes. In 1955, the tract was completed with the construction of Los Alamitos Park. Los Alamitos Terrace, a 193-unit subdivision, was built north of Old Town West on a Bixby-operated dairy farm whose headquarters was present-day Los Alamitos High School.

In 1956, Ross Cortese purchased land to build the walled community of Rossmoor southwest of Los Alamitos. Rossmoor, Orange County's largest single development, was the first walled community in the United States and home to over 10,000 upper-middle-class professionals. Rossmoor's homes were initially designed by Earle G. Kaltenbach, and two later phases were designed by Chris Choate. Ranch-style homes dominated 1950s suburban architecture. Before Rossmoor, Choate and May worked with Cortese on the nearby Lakewood Rancho Estates in Long Beach.

Although Rossmoor is not part of Los Alamitos, they have become linked. When Los Alamitos was incorporated, its population was about 3,400; Rossmoor's population was almost 10,000. Los Alamitos is slightly larger, with a population of over 11,000. Rossmoor's success led to the Los Alamitos subdivisions of Dutch Haven (1960), Rossmoor Highlands (1961), and Suburbia, New Dutch Haven, Greenbrook and College Park North (1967). Los Alamitos has been the hometown for a number of noted athletes, including baseball Hall of Famer Bob Lemon (although he spent more time in Long Beach), and Olympic gymnast Cathy Rigby. The Los Alamitos youth baseball leagues, which began in 1958 as the Rossmoor Little League and (after moving its fields to the Navy base) changing its name to Los Alamitos Youth baseball), developed Andy Messersmith. During the late 1980s, six former league players were playing major-league baseball: Robb Nen, J. T. Snow, Greg Harris, Dennis Lamp, Greg Pirkl, and Mike Kelly. The area has been home to long-distance swimmer Lynne Cox, California Supreme Court Chief Justice Malcolm M. Lucas, and mystery writer Jan Burke.

== Geography ==
Los Alamitos is bordered by Cypress on the north and east, West Garden Grove on the east, and Seal Beach on the south. The census-designated place of Rossmoor is bordered by Los Alamitos on the north, east, and west. The city shares a northwestern border with Long Beach's El Dorado Park neighborhood. Coyote Creek separates Los Alamitos from Long Beach.

=== Flora ===
The most common native plant species are hairy sand verbena, red sand verbena, and pink sand verbena.

=== Climate ===
Los Alamitos, California

Climate chart (precipitation, max. and min. temperature)
J	F	M	A	M	J	J	A	S	O	N	D
3 68 46	3 68 48	2.4 69 50	0.6 73 53	0.2 74 58	0.1 78 61	0 83 65	0.1 85 66	0.2 83 64	0.4 79 58	1.1 73 50	1.8 69 45
- █ Average max. and min. temperatures in °F
- █ Precipitation totals in inches
- Source: Weather.com / NWS
Metric conversion
J	F	M	A	M	J	J	A	S	O	N	D
75 20 8	76 20 9	62 21 10	15 23 12	5.8 23 14	2 26 16	0.5 28 18	2.5 29 19	6.1 28 18	10 26 14	28 23 10	45 21 7
- █ Average max. and min. temperatures in °C
- █ Precipitation totals in mm

Los Alamitos' USDA hardiness zone is 9, and its Sunset climate zone is 22.

== Demographics ==
Historical population
Census	Pop.	Note	%±
1960	4,312		—
1970	11,346		163.1%
1980	11,529		1.6%
1990	11,676		1.3%
2000	11,536		−1.2%
2010	11,449		−0.8%
2020	11,780		2.9%
2024 (est.)	11,846	▲	0.6%
U.S. Decennial Census; 1860–1870 1880-1890; 1900 1910 1920; 1930 1940 1950; 1960 1970 1980; 1990 2000 2010; 2020

Los Alamitos was first listed as a city in the 1960 U.S. census. Before then, the area was part of Seal Beach Township (1950 population 6,824).

=== Racial and ethnic composition ===
Race / Ethnicity (NH = Non-Hispanic)	Pop 1980	Pop 1990	Pop. 2000	Pop. 2010	Pop. 2020	% 1980	% 1990	% 2000	% 2010	% 2020
NH white	9,530	9,040	7,836	6,721	5,449	82.66%	77.42%	67.93%	58.70%	46.26%
NH Black or African American	56	337	358	300	347	0.49%	2.89%	3.10%	2.62%	2.95%
NH Native American or Alaska Native	91	45	31	22	34	0.79%	0.39%	0.27%	0.19%	0.29%
NH Asian	423	781	1,090	1,447	2,060	3.67%	6.69%	9.45%	12.64%	17.49%
NH Native Hawaiian or Pacific Islander	423	781	35	47	69	3.67%	6.69%	0.30%	0.41%	0.59%
NH other	35	13	18	46	68	0.30%	0.11%	0.16%	0.40%	0.58%
NH multiracial	x	x	320	448	727	x	x	2.77%	3.91%	6.17%
Hispanic or Latino	1,394	1,460	1,848	2,418	3,026	12.09%	12.50%	16.02%	21.12%	25.69%
Total	11,529	11,676	11,536	11,449	11,780	100.00%	100.00%	100.00%	100.00%	100.00%

=== 2020 census ===
As of the 2020 census, Los Alamitos had a population of 11,780, with a population density of 2,938.4 inhabitants per square mile (1,134.5/km^{2}).

The city's racial makeup was 53.3% White, 3.3% Black or African American, 0.9% American Indian and Alaska Native, 17.8% Asian, 1.6% Native Hawaiian and Other Pacific Islander, 0.5% from other races, and 15.6% from two or more races. Hispanic or Latino residents of any race were 25.7% of the population.

The census indicated that 98.8% of residents lived in households, 0.1% lived in non-institutionalized group quarters, and 1.1% were institutionalized. 100.0% of residents lived in urban areas and 0.0% lived in rural areas.

There were 4,321 households in Los Alamitos, of which 39.2% had children under age 18 living in them. Of all households, 48.2% were married-couple households, 15.9% had a male householder and no spouse or partner present, and 30.2% had a female householder and no spouse or partner present. Individuals made up 20.9% of all households, and 10.3% had someone living alone who was 65 years of age or older. The average household size was 2.73. There were 3,104 families (72.8% of all households).

The age distribution was 23.5% under age 18, 8.9% ages 18 to 24, 25.4% ages 25 to 44, 26.1% ages 45 to 64, and 16.1% age 65 or older. The median age was 39.3 years. For every 100 females, there were 91.0 males, and for every 100 females age 18 and over there were 86.4 males age 18 and over.

There were 4,376 housing units, with an average density of 1,091.5 units per square mile (421.4 units/km^{2}); 97.5% were occupied and 2.5% were vacant. Of occupied units, 44.4% were owner-occupied and 55.6% were renter-occupied. The homeowner vacancy rate was 0.5% and the rental vacancy rate was 2.2%.

=== 2023 ACS estimates ===
In 2023, the U.S. Census Bureau estimated that the median household income was $98,539 and the per capita income was $51,404. About 7.2 percent of families and 9.3 percent of the population were living below the poverty line.

=== 2010 census ===
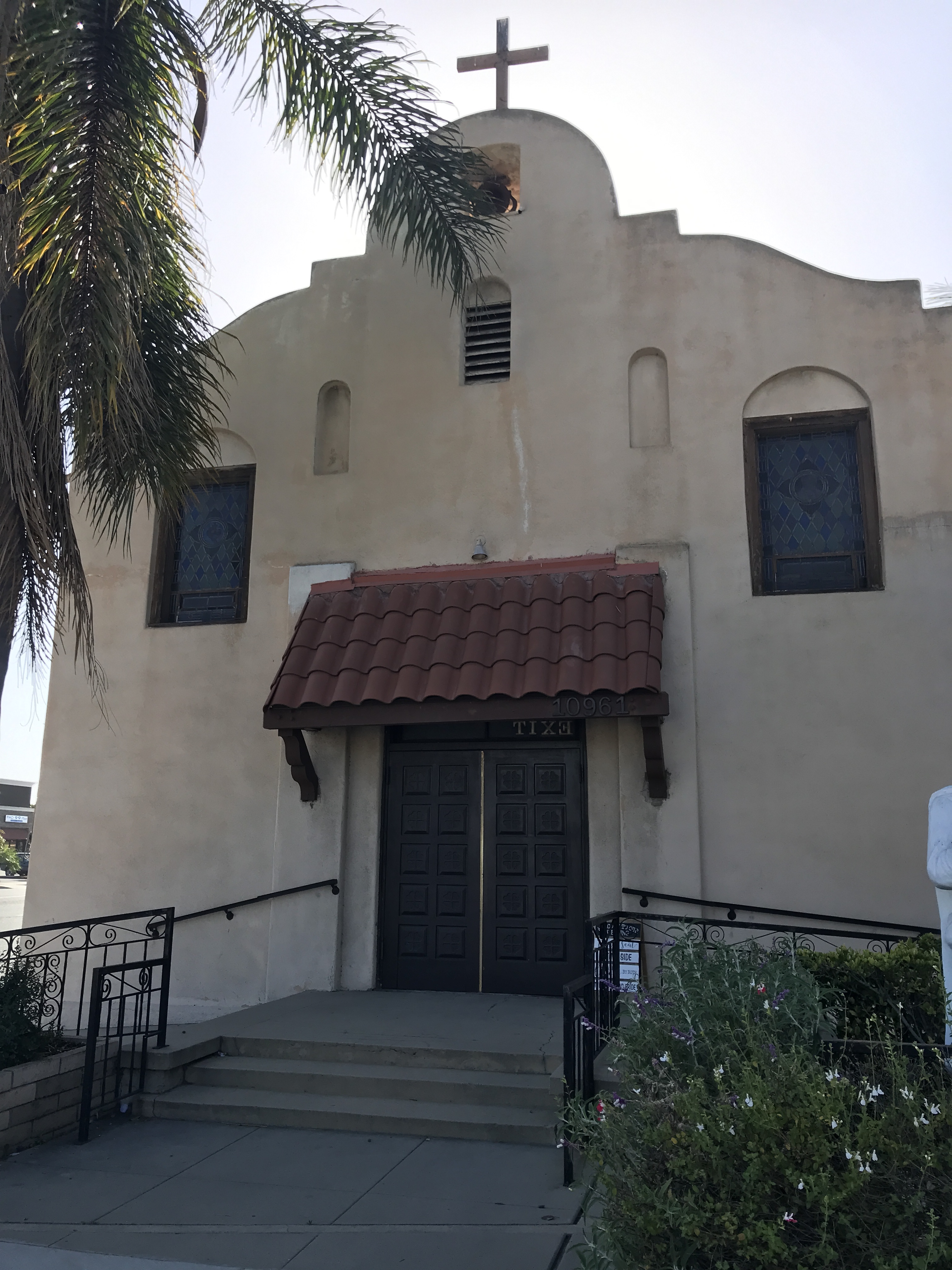
St. Isidore Catholic Church

The city had a 2010 population of 11,449, with a population density of 2,781.8 inhabitants per square mile (1,074.1/km^{2}). Los Alamitos' racial makeup was 8,131 (71 percent) white (58.7 percent non-Hispanic white), 324 (2.8 percent) African American, 51 (0.4 percent) native American, 1,471 (12.8 percent) Asian, 50 (0.4 percent) Pacific islander, 726 (6.3 percent) from other races, and 696 (6.1 percent) from two or more races. The Hispanic or Latino population (any race) was 2,418 (21.1 percent). According to the census, 11,206 people (97.9 percent) lived in households; 40 (0.3 percent) lived in non-institutional group quarters, and 203 (1.8 percent) were institutionalized.

There were 4,212 households, of which 1,610 (38.2 percent) included children under age 18; 2,025 (48.1 percent) were opposite-sex married couples, 731 (17.4 percent) had a female householder with no husband, 282 (6.7 percent) had a male householder with no wife. There were 209 (five percent) unmarried opposite-sex partnerships, and 19 (0.5 percent) same-sex married couples or partnerships. Individuals made up 885 households (21 percent), and 355 (8.4 percent) had someone living alone who was 65 or older. Average household size was 2.66. There were 3,038 families (72.1 percent of all households); the average family size was 3.10.

Ages were diverse, with 2,741 people (23.9 percent) under age 18, 1,077 people (9.4 percent) aged 18 to 24, 2,938 people (25.7 percent) aged 25 to 44, 3,099 people (27.1 percent) aged 45 to 64, and 1,594 people (13.9 percent) age 65 or older. The city's median age was 38.7 years. For every 100 females, there were 89.5 males. For every 100 females age 18 and over, there were 87.1 males.

There were 4,355 housing units, with an average density of 1,058.2 per square mile (408.6/km^{2}), of which 1,967 (46.7 percent) were owner-occupied and 2,245 (53.3 percent) were rented. The homeowner vacancy rate was 0.8 percent, and the rental vacancy rate was 3.1 percent. Owner-occupied units housed 5,274 people (46.1 percent), and 5,932 (51.8 percent) lived in rental housing. Median household income was $80,449, and 7.2 percent of the population lived below the federal poverty line.

== Government ==
Los Alamitos vote by party in presidential elections
Year	Democratic	Republican	Third parties
2024	48.69% (2,853)	47.94% (2,809)	3.38% (198)
2020	51.63% (3,192)	45.74% (2,828)	2.64% (163)
2016	47.08% (2,372)	45.06% (2,270)	7.86% (396)
2012	45.11% (2,212)	51.86% (2,543)	3.04% (149)
2008	47.62% (2,436)	49.98% (2,557)	2.40% (123)
2004	42.63% (2,076)	55.50% (2,703)	1.87% (91)
2000	42.97% (1,919)	52.33% (2,337)	4.70% (210)
1996	41.23% (1,733)	46.75% (1,965)	12.02% (505)
1992	36.65% (1,875)	37.65% (1,926)	25.70% (1,315)
1988	36.59% (1,721)	62.28% (2,929)	1.13% (53)
1984	28.65% (1,249)	70.38% (3,068)	0.96% (42)
1980	29.00% (1,246)	61.38% (2,637)	9.61% (413)

The five-member, elected City Council represents the city's five districts. The council's first meeting of the year appoints one of its members to be mayor for the year. After the selection of a mayor, the mayor holds a city-council election to appoint a council member as mayor pro tempore. Tanya Doby is the mayor of Los Alamitos.

=== State, federal, and county representation ===
In the California State Legislature, Los Alamitos is in the 36th senatorial district, represented by Republican Tony Strickland, and in the 70th Assembly district, represented by Republican Tri Ta In the United States House of Representatives, Los Alamitos is in California's 45th congressional district, represented by Democrat Derek Tran. The city, in the Orange County Board of Supervisors' first district, has been represented by Janet Nguyen since 2024. According to the Orange County Registrar of Voters, Los Alamitos had 7,526 registered voters on May 17, 2025. Of those, 2,676 were registered Republicans; 2,725 were registered Democrats, and 1,577 (26.72 percent) declined to state a political party.

== Economy ==
The first Claim Jumper restaurant opened in Los Alamitos in 1977; in 2025, the location was a Hof's Hut. Neverland Studios, often used by Christian rock bands, was in Los Alamitos. Tillys had its original location in the city.

=== Top employers ===
According to the Los Alamitos 2022 Comprehensive Annual Financial Report, the city's top employers are:

#	Employer	# of employees
1	UCI Health – Los Alamitos	1,100
2	Arrowhead Products	780
3	Trend Offset Printing	700
4	Epson America	693
5	Mittera California	238
6	Discovery Practice Management	205
7	Bar Bakers	200
8	Resare Marketing	191
9	Alamitos West Health & Rehabilitation	145
9	Evergreen Pharmaceutical of California	145
9	Katella Delicatessen-Restaurant-Bakery	145

== Infrastructure ==
=== Bus service ===
Orange County Transportation Authority operates bus service in the city.

=== Water ===
Water in Los Alamitos is supplied by the Golden State Water Company, which obtains its water from the Metropolitan Water District of Southern California by importing water from the Colorado River Aqueduct and the California State Water Project. Groundwater is also pumped from the Orange County Groundwater Basin.

== Notable people ==
- Dana Andrews, actor
- Aaron Barrett, musician, founding member of Reel Big Fish
- Jonathan Bornstein (born 1984), soccer player for USA National Team, Chivas USA, and Chicago Fire
- Tim Carey, football player (attended Los Alamitos High School, but grew up in Seal Beach)
- Kami Cotler (born 1965), actress
- Lynne Cox, long-distance swimmer
- Troy Edgar, American security official
- Landry Fields, basketball player for the New York Knicks (attended Los Alamitos High School, but grew up in Long Beach)
- Ralph Flanagan, Olympic swimmer
- Scott Klopfenstein, musician, former member of Reel Big Fish
- Chris Kluwe, former punter for the Minnesota Vikings (attended Los Alamitos High School, but grew up in Seal Beach)
- Bob Lemon, baseball Hall of Famer as pitcher and manager, lived in City Garden Acres (now Apartment Row) and attended Laurel Elementary before family moved to Long Beach
- Marcedes Lewis, tight end for the Green Bay Packers
- Allison Mack, actress (Chloe in Smallville)
- Taryn Manning (born 1978), actress
- Nikki Monninger, bass guitarist for Silversun Pickups
- Matthew Morrison, singer and actor (Broadway plays, Fox TV's Glee) – attended Los Alamitos HS, but grew up in Cypress
- Tony Muser, former MLB player and manager
- Robb Nen, baseball player—attended Los Alamitos High School, but grew up in Seal Beach
- Cathy Rigby, Olympic gymnast and actress
- Matt "Money" Smith, Fox Sports Radio talk show host
- J. T. Snow (born 1968), baseball player (attended Los Alamitos HS, but grew up in Seal Beach)
- Jodie Sweetin, actress (Stephanie Tanner in Full House)
- Ryan Davis (1979–2013), video game journalist, GameSpot writer and co-founder of Giant Bomb

== Schools ==
The Los Alamitos Unified School District began in 1898 as the Laurel Elementary School District and changed its name in 1953 to the Los Alamitos Elementary School District, providing education through the sixth grade. Students in grades 7-12 attended schools in the Anaheim School District until 1979, when local voters withdrew from the Anaheim High School District and unified their local grades as the Los Alamitos Unified School District.

- Los Alamitos High School (opened September 1967, moved into present location in September 1968)
- Laurel High School (continuation high school, absorbed by Los Alamitos High School in 2014)
- McAuliffe Middle School (originally Pine Junior High)
- Oak Middle School (originally Oak Junior High)
- Hopkinson Elementary in Rossmoor
- Lee Elementary in Rossmoor
- Los Alamitos Elementary
- Rossmoor Elementary in Rossmoor
- Weaver Elementary in Rossmoor
- McGaugh Elementary in Seal Beach
- St. Hedwig School, a K–8 private school

== Friendship cities ==
- Cranbourne, Victoria, Australia
