= WSJU-TV =

Television station in San Juan, Puerto Rico (1985–2017)

- San Juan; Puerto Rico
- Channels: Digital: 31 (UHF); Virtual: 31
- Branding: Aerco Broadcasting Network

Programming
- Affiliations: Independent (1966–1967, 1985–1986, 1989–1991, 1997–1998, 1999–2008, 2009–2011); Dark (1967–1984, 1991–1997, 2017–2018); Religious (1984–1985); Univision (1987–1988); Telefe Internacional (1998–1999); Mega TV (2008–2009); Tiva TV (2011–2015); Telemicro Internacional (2015–2016); SuperLatina TV (2016–2017)

Ownership
- Owner: AiLive Network; (Aerco Broadcasting Corporation)
- Sister stations: WSJU-LD, WQBS, WQBS-FM, WZET, WIOA, WIOC, W295BU, WIBS, WRSJ, WGIT

History
- First air date: May 30, 1985
- Last air date: September 5, 2017 (32 years, 98 days) (license canceled June 26, 2018)
- Former call signs: WRWR-TV (1985–2000)
- Former channel numbers: Analog: 30 (UHF, 1985–2009)
- Call sign meaning: "San Juan"

Technical information
- Facility ID: 4077
- ERP: 66 kW
- HAAT: 267 m (876 ft)
- Transmitter coordinates: 18°16′23″N 66°5′35″W

WSJU-TV (channel 31) was a television station in San Juan, Puerto Rico, owned by Aerco Broadcasting Corporation. The station's studios were located at the IBC-AERCO building at 1554 Bori Street, Urb. Antonsanti in Rio Piedras. Its transmitter was located at Cerro la Marquesa in Aguas Buenas.

During most of the 2000s, the station's programming consisted mostly of music videos until it became an affiliate of Spanish Broadcasting System's Mega TV on August 25, 2008. It was carried by Dish Network and Liberty Puerto Rico.

== Prior use of channel 30 ==
The El Imparcial newspaper built WITA-TV, which operated from June 1966 to June 1967. The station was a financial failure and left the air after a year of broadcasting. The construction permit and additional permits for stations in Ponce and Mayagüez were sold in 1969; the new owner came close to rebuilding the San Juan station and signing on the others but saw its finances unravel and never put any of them back on the air.

== History ==
WRWR-TV received its construction permit on December 18, 1980. Its original permitholders, La Fe del Progreso Broadcasting Corporation, envisioned it as a religious station to be called Nueva Visión (New Vision). The station began broadcasting on channel 30 on May 30, 1985. It was known as Cinema 30 and broadcast older movies. It had translators on channels 16 (WTRA) in Mayagüez and 48 (WIEC) in Ponce. The station was in poor financial condition; by February 1987, it was noted that infomercials and home shopping were taking up an increasing amount of its airtime. Bay Broadcasting attempted to get Mexican broadcaster Televisa to invest in the station. The next month, it affiliated with Univision. In the meantime, the station battled through bankruptcy proceedings initiated in Florida and later transferred to Puerto Rico courts.

The station went off the air around 1991. It then reappeared around 1999 through 2000. It applied to assign its station license from Three Star Telecast to International Broadcasting Corp.

Prior to and including the early 1990s, the call letters WSJU (now WTCV) were used by an NBC affiliated station broadcasting on UHF channel 18 (Liberty channel 12) with studios in Carolina, Puerto Rico. Most of the programming was in English, making it one of at least two stations at the time to broadcast in English (the other was WPRV-TV, "The Bright Spot"). In addition to carrying local television programming like The Judy Gordon Show and Chicola y la Ganga, WSJU carried a variety of NBC programs such as Wheel of Fortune, The Tonight Show Starring Johnny Carson (and later Jay Leno), and Late Night with David Letterman during his run at NBC.

As with many stations serving the metropolitan area of San Juan and vicinity, the transmitter tower was located on top of the peak of El Yunque. Broadcasting hours ran from 6 a.m. to midnight daily. At the end of each broadcast day, the station played video rolls of the Puerto Rican and United States national anthems.

Today, the Carolina studios for the former WSJU are owned and operated by the local affiliate of the Catholic Radio and Television Network, TeleOro channel 13 (WORO-DT; formerly WPRV-TV).

WSJU has continuously been branded as "Tele San Juan" from its time on channel 18 to its current seat on channel 30.

In August 2008, SBS entered into an agreement with WSJU, which had formerly aired music videos, making it an affiliate of Mega TV. Mega TV Puerto Rico, as WSJU was branded from then on, carried a full prime time schedule as well as a Puerto Rico-focused newscast, Meganoticias.

WSJU aired infomercials 15 hours a day (midnight to 3 p.m.).

WSJU-TV ended regular programming on its analog signal, over UHF channel 30, on June 12, 2009, the official date when full-power television stations in the United States transitioned from analog to digital broadcasts under federal mandate. The station's digital signal remained on its pre-transition UHF channel 31. As part of the SAFER Act, WSJU-TV kept its analog signal on the air until June 26 to inform viewers of the digital television transition through a loop of public service announcements from the National Association of Broadcasters.

In August 2009, the station opened a digital subchannel dedicated to music videos. This subchannel made its formal debut in September 2009 as PlayTV. Like competing music video channels TCV and VideoMax, PlayTV allowed viewers to send text messages to friends, which were displayed on air. PlayTV differentiated itself though, in that they assigned numeric codes to each music video, and viewers could send a text message to the station using those codes to request a particular video.

In October 2009, WSJU opened a third subchannel airing programming from the Dominican Republic.

WSJU-TV became the dominant television station for young adults by airing music videos in partnership with major record companies. In 2010, WSJU-TV introduced new television stations that proved to have significant value to TV viewers.

WSJU-TV also developed new media platforms (known as AiLive Network) to complement its electronic media offering, adding iPhone, Android, Internet, Games and many more digital platforms that received WSJU's host of stations regardless of viewers' locations. AiLive also allowed viewers to send text messages to friends, which were displayed on air.

WSJU-TV reached 80 percent of the 1,000,000 households directly over-the-air and 100% of the territory via the three major cable providers.

In April 2017, WSJU-TV announced that it would shut down in the next few months, after the Federal Communications Commission (FCC)'s incentive auction, without any channel sharing agreement. The station successfully sold its spectrum for $5,202,091.

Due to the passage of Hurricane Irma and Hurricane Maria across Puerto Rico, WSJU-TV ceased broadcasting on September 5, 2017, ending nearly 34 years of operation, with the station's studios and transmitter facilities destroyed in the process and knocking the station off the air on September 20. Its license was canceled by the FCC on June 26, 2018.

On June 27, 2019, WSJU-TV's intellectual unit was moved to WSJU-LP in Ceiba, which is now branded as Fresh 99.9 TV, for its music video programming, and W08EI-D, which broadcast TeleMaxx on channel 39.1 until November 1, 2020.

== Subchannels ==
The station's signal was multiplexed:

Subchannels of WSJU-TV
Channel	Res.	Short name	Programming
31.1	480i	WSJU-D1	Main WSJU-TV programming (4:3)
31.2	480i	WSJU-D2	Infomercials (4:3)
31.3	480i	WSJU-D3	France 24 (4:3)
31.4	Audio only	WSJU-D4	WQBS 870 AM
31.5	480i	WSJU-D5	Dominican View (4:3)
31.6	480i	WSJU-D6	TeveSalud (4:3)
