= WVOZ =

WVOZ may refer to:

- WVOZ (AM), a radio station (1260 AM) licensed to serve Ponce, Puerto Rico
- WVOZ-TV, a television station (channel 36, virtual channel 48) licensed to serve Ponce, Puerto Rico
- WBQN, a radio station (1580 AM) licensed to serve Aguadilla, Puerto Rico, which held the call sign WVOZ from 2016 to 2024
- WRSJ, a radio station (1520 AM) licensed to serve San Juan, Puerto Rico, which held the call sign WVOZ from 1996 to 2016
- WQBS (AM), a radio station (870 AM) licensed to serve San Juan, Puerto Rico, which held the call sign WVOZ from 1980 to 1992
- WQBS-FM, a radio station (107.7 FM) licensed to serve Carolina, Puerto Rico, which held the call sign WVOZ-FM from 1983 to 1984 and from 1998 to 2016
- WIDA (AM), a radio station (870 AM) licensed to serve Carolina, Puerto Rico, which held the call sign WVOZ from 1964 to 1980
