= WJPX =

Television station in San Juan, Puerto Rico

WJPX and WIRS

WJPX: San Juan; WIRS: Yauco; Puerto Rico
- Channels for WJPX: Digital: 21 (UHF), shared with WTCV; Virtual: 18, 24, 42
- Channels for WIRS: Digital: 17 (UHF), shared with WVEO; Virtual: 17, 24, 42
- Branding: América Tevé Puerto Rico (general); América Noticias (newscasts)

Programming
- Affiliations: 24.1: América Tevé; 42.1: SonLife

Ownership
- Owner: America CV Network; (America-CV Stations Group, Inc.)

History
- First air date: WJPX: February 15, 1987; WIRS: December 1, 1991
- Former call signs: WJPX: WSJN-TV (1987–1998)
- Former names: WJPX: Telenet (2000–2004)
- Former channel number: WJPX: Analog: 24 (UHF, 1987–2009); WIRS: Analog: 42 (UHF, 1991–2009); Digital: 41 (UHF, 2004–2017)
- Former affiliations: Independent (1987–1990, 1993–1998, 2000–2004); Silent (1990–1993); Pax TV (1998–2000); MTV (2004–2007); America CV Network (2007–2012); MundoFox/MundoMax (2012–2016); WIRS: Religious independent (1991–2004); MTV (2004–2007); America CV Network (2007–2012); América Tevé (2012–2016)
- Call sign meaning: WJPX: San Juan Pax (former affiliation)

Technical information
- Licensing authority: FCC
- Facility ID: WJPX: 58340; WIRS: 39887
- ERP: WJPX: 1,000 kW; 696 kW (STA); WIRS: 36.0 kW
- HAAT: WJPX: 565 m (1,854 ft); WIRS: 372 m (1,220 ft)
- Transmitter coordinates: WJPX: 18°10′3″N 66°34′35″W; WIRS: 18°18′59″N 67°10′41″W
- Translator: see § Satellite stations

Links
- Public license information: WJPX: Public file; LMS; WIRS: Public file; LMS
- Website: www.americatevepr.com

WJPX (channel 24) is a Spanish-language independent television station in San Juan, Puerto Rico. The station brands itself as América TeVé Puerto Rico.

WIRS is a semi-satellite of WJPX and a SonLife-affiliated television station licensed to Yauco, Puerto Rico.

Owned by America CV Stations Group, the two stations share studio facilities located in Amelia Industrial Park in Guaynabo; WJPX shares its transmitter facilities with WTCV at Barrio Cubuy in Canovanas and the transmitter for WIRS is located at the WVEO transmitter site at Cerro Canta Gallo in Aguada.

== History ==
Former logo as a MundoMax affiliate, used from 2015 until 2016.

The station was founded in 1987 and was a 24-hour news station branded as WSJN 24 Horas, El Canal de Noticias. Some Puerto Rican television reporters started their careers at WSJN, such as Maria Celeste Arraras, Ada Torres Toro, Sol Sostre, Nelson Bermejo, Tony Dandrades, Luis Guardiola, Nellie Rivera, Lyanne Melendez, Edna Schmidt and Roberto Cortes.

In 1993, WSJN-TV returned to the air, and was owned by El Nuevo Comandante Racetrack corporation, broadcasting Horse racing, and it is branded as Telenet.

On January 13, 1998, WSJN-TV changed its callsign to the current WJPX, after Paxson Communications purchased the station. On August 31, 1998, WJPX, along with the rest of the Paxson stations, premiered the new Pax TV television network, with a programming mix of infomercials, off-network reruns labeled as "family entertainment", and The Worship Network during overnights.

WJPX was later sold to LIN TV in 2000, which affiliated the station with MTV. At that time, the station broadcast MTV programs (both locally produced and imported from the main MTV network), videos and horse races. The MTV branding and programming were licensed from Viacom, which, incidentally, once owned two of WJPX's then-sister stations: WWHO in Columbus, Ohio and WNDY-TV in Indianapolis, before those stations were sold to LIN in 2005.

On October 19, 2006, LIN TV announced that it had entered into an agreement to sell WJPX along with sister station WAPA-TV to InterMedia Partners for $130 million in cash. The sale was completed on March 30, 2007.

InterMedia Partners then sold the station again to Caribevision Station Group. The sale was completed in October 2007.

From March 19, 2009, the subchannel digital 24.2 began transmitting Camarero Racetrack.

On August 13, 2012, WJPX began broadcasting MundoFox; at that time, América Tevé moved to WIRS channel 42.1. On June 15, 2015, MundoFox (which became MundoMax the following month) was moved to channel 24.1 on WKPV in Ponce, WIRS, and WJWN-TV in San Sebastian, while América Tevé moved to channel 42.1 on WJPX, WKPV, and WJWN.

WJPX's affiliation with MundoMax ended on August 1, 2016. At that time, the station began to carry América Tevé on channel 24.1. On that same date, WIRS launched a new programming format called Teveo, which is stylized as a 24-hour news channel that airs each weekday from 5 p.m. to midnight and weekends from 7 to 11 p.m. Teveo carries all of the station's live newscasts, along with rebroadcasts of its 6 and 11 p.m. newscasts and its public affairs programs. It also added live weekday hour-long 7 and 9 p.m. newscasts on that date, making it the only station in Puerto Rico with newscasts in those timeslots. On weekends, Teveo carries a "week-in-review" selection of its news programs. Paid programming is shown at other times of the day. On November 12, 2016, WIRS was disaffiliated with Teveo and switched to the Sonlife Broadcasting Network, a religious television network, owned by televangelist Jimmy Swaggart, which was seen on W26DK-D channel 25.2 in San Juan, W31DL-D channel 36.2 in Ponce and W51DJ-D channel 51.2 in Mayaguez.

== Technical information ==
=== WJPX subchannels ===
Subchannels of WJPX and WTCV
License	Subchannel	Res.	Short name	Programming
WTCV	18.1	720p	WTCV-HD	Daystar Español
WTCV	18.2	720p	WTCV.2	Daystar
WJPX	24.1	720p	WJPX-HD	América Tevé
WJPX	42.1	480i	SBN.PR	Sonlife

=== WIRS subchannels ===
Subchannels of WVEO and WIRS
License	Subchannel	Res.	Short name	Programming
WVEO	17.1	1080i	MEGA-HD	Daystar Español
WIRS	24.1	1080i	ATV.PR	América Tevé
WIRS	42.1	480i	SBN.PR	Sonlife

WJPX and WJWN-TV shut down their analog signals over UHF channels 24 and 38, on June 12, 2009, the official date on which full-power television stations in the United States transitioned from analog to digital broadcasts under federal mandate. WKPV and WIRS shut down their analog signals on channels 20 and 42 on April 17. The stations' digital signals remained on their pre-transition UHF channels 21, 19, 41 and 39, using virtual channels 24, 42, 20 and 38.

== Satellite stations ==
WJPX and WIRS can be seen across Puerto Rico on the following stations:

Station	City of license	Digital channel	First air date	ERP	HAAT	Facility ID	Transmitter Coordinates	Public license information
WKPV	Ponce	36 (UHF) (shared with WVOZ-TV) (PSIP: 24)	August 6, 1985	23.5 kW (main); 52 kW (application); 1.83 kW (CP); 77.6 kW (STA)	250 m (820 ft)	58341	18°4′42″N 66°44′52″W	Profile; LMS
WJWN-TV	San Sebastián	33 (UHF) (PSIP: 24)	1986	62.1 kW; 245 kW (application)	625.7m	58342	18°8′53.1″N 66°58′58.6″W	Profile; LMS

== FCC spectrum auction & WJPX/WIRS sale ==
In 2012, the Federal Communications Commission announced they were going to hold a voluntary Incentive Auction for a portion of the radio frequency spectrum that is currently used by Digital Television broadcasters across the country. WJPX & WIRS announced he would participate in the auction, since it was estimated the stations would net somewhere in the range of $291 & US$264 Million, much more than it would be worth on the open market otherwise. Since that time the auction estimate has increased to somewhere between $220 & US$198 Million, with the auction currently scheduled to take place in early 2016.

=== Spectrum reallocation ===
On April 13, 2017, it was revealed that WKPV and WIRS's over-the-air spectrum had been sold in the FCC's spectrum reallocation auction, fetching $6,945,255 and $6,657,792 respectively. WKPV and WIRS will not sign off, but it will later share broadcast spectrum with WVEO in Aguadilla and WVOZ-TV in Ponce, both of them are Mega TV owned and operated. America CV stated that WJPX had a better signal than that of WKPV and WIRS.
