= WTCV =

Television station in San Juan, Puerto Rico

- San Juan; Puerto Rico
- Channels: Digital: 21 (UHF), shared with WJPX; Virtual: 18

Programming
- Affiliations: 18.1: Daystar Español; 18.2: Daystar

Ownership
- Owner: Daystar Television Network; (Word of God Fellowship, Inc.)

History
- First air date: October 1, 1964; (original incarnation); July 29, 1984; (current incarnation)
- Former call signs: WTSJ-TV (1964–1972); WSJU (1984–1997); WTCV-TV (1997–2001); WAVB-TV (2001–2002)
- Former channel numbers: Analog: 18 (UHF, 1964–1972, 1984–2009); Digital: 32 (UHF, 2005–2017); Virtual: 32 (2009-2019)
- Former affiliations: NBC (1964–1972, 1984–1991); Silent (1972–1984); Independent (1991–2014); HSN (2001–2002); Destino TV (2013); Mega TV (2014–2025)
- Call sign meaning: "Tu Canal de Videos"

Technical information
- Licensing authority: FCC
- Facility ID: 28954
- ERP: 1,000 kW
- HAAT: 564 m (1,850 ft)
- Transmitter coordinates: 18°16′38″N 65°51′13″W
- Translator(s): see § Satellite stations

Links
- Public license information: Public file; LMS
- Website: daystar.com

WTCV (channel 18) is a religious television station in San Juan, Puerto Rico, owned by the Daystar Television Network. Through a channel sharing agreement with independent station WJPX (channel 24, owned by América-CV Station Group), the two stations share transmitter facilities at Barrio Cubuy in Canovanas.

WTCV operates two satellite stations: WVEO (channel 17) in Aguadilla, with transmitter on Cerro Canto Gallo in Aguada, and WVOZ-TV (channel 36) in Ponce, with transmitter on Sec Servo Paso in Peñuelas.

== History ==
During the 1980s and early 1990s, WTCV was known as WSJU (for San Juan) and was an NBC affiliate, one of three commercial English-language network affiliates broadcasting in Puerto Rico (the others being WPRV-TV and WUJA) during the 80s. Around 1990, the station also carried the Home Shopping Network programming during most of the late morning and afternoon. There are now four commercial English-language network affiliates in Puerto Rico, all of which broadcast from San Juan and Mayagüez.

On September 11, 2014, WTCV became a Mega TV owned-and-operated station, following the sale of Spanish Broadcasting System through its License Management Agreement for $1.9 million, leaving its status as an Independent station, while its former owner, International Broadcasting Corporation continues to be its Licensee, until SBS will transfer WIOA (99.9 FM), WIOC (105.1 FM) and WZET (92.1 FM) to IBC's TV operations. Beginning in March 2015, WTCV's local programming will be produced by SBS Puerto Rico, which owns Z-93, La Nueva 94, Estereotempo and La Mega. The sale of WTCV with SBS was completed on September 1, 2015.

On January 12, 2018, WTCV announced that Conectao's por la Cocina, ¿Y Cual es su Opinion? and Descarao por la Noche had been canceled due to economic loss, as well as expiring contracts with local talent and production staff.

On September 24, 2019, WTCV and its satellite stations switched their virtual channel to 18.1 across all Puerto Rico.

On June 5, 2025, SBS announced the sale of WTCV and its satellites to the Daystar Television Network for $6.5 million; the sale was completed on August 18.

== Notable current on-air staff ==
- Antonio Sanchez "El Gangster" – El Circo
- Braulio Castillo – co-host of La Movida
- Jaime Bayly – Bayly
- Pedro Sevcec – Sevcec
- Alberto Cutié – Hablando Claro Con El Padre Alberto

== Technical information ==
=== WTCV subchannels ===
Subchannels of WJPX and WTCV
License	Subchannel	Res.	Short name	Programming
WTCV	18.1	720p	WTCV-HD	Daystar Español
WTCV	18.2	720p	WTCV.2	Daystar
WJPX	24.1	720p	WJPX-HD	América Tevé
WJPX	42.1	480i	SBN.PR	Sonlife

On February 17, 2009, WTCV signed off its analog signal and completed its move to digital.

=== WVEO subchannels ===
Subchannels of WVEO and WIRS
License	Subchannel	Res.	Short name	Programming
WVEO	17.1	1080i	MEGA-HD	Daystar Español
WIRS	24.1	1080i	ATV.PR	América Tevé
WIRS	42.1	480i	SBN.PR	Sonlife

=== Spectrum reallocation ===
On August 7, 2017, it was revealed that WTCV's over-the-air spectrum had been sold in the FCC's spectrum reallocation auction, fetching $4,737,874. WTCV would not sign off, but it would later share broadcast spectrum with WJPX, affiliated with América TeVé in Puerto Rico that covers the entire metropolitan area.

== Satellite stations ==
WTCV can be seen across Puerto Rico on the following stations:

Station	City of license	Channels (Digital/ Virtual)	First air date	ERP	HAAT	Facility ID	Transmitter coordinates	Public license information
WVEO^{1}	Aguadilla	17 (UHF), shared with WIRS; 18	October 7, 1974	42.5 kW (main); 1.4 kW (DTS); 309 kW (application); 35.2 kW (STA)	372 m (1,220 ft)	61573	18°18′59″N 67°10′41″W	Public file LMS
WVOZ-TV^{2}	Ponce	36 (UHF), shared with WKPV; 18	June 1986	23.5 kW (main); 1.83 kW (CP); 61.7 kW (application)	250 m (820 ft)	29000	18°4′42.8″N 66°44′48.6″W	Public file LMS

Notes:

- 1. WVEO was owned by Southwestern Broadcasting, and serves as a satellite of WKBM-TV from its 1974 sign-on until 1981 and WAPA-TV from 1982 until 1999.
- 2. WVOZ-TV used the callsign WIEC from its 1986 sign-on until 1993.
