= WNYX-LD =

Television station in East Orange, New Jersey

- East Orange, New Jersey; New York, New York; United States
- City: East Orange, New Jersey
- Channels: Digital: 4 (VHF); Virtual: 34

Programming
- Affiliations: 34.1: Infomercials; 34.2: Shop LC; 34.3: Jewelry TV

Ownership
- Owner: SagamoreHill Broadcasting; (SagamoreHill of Kansas City Licenses, LLC)

History
- First air date: 1993
- Former call signs: W23BA (1993–2001); W31CK (2001–2002); W34CP (2002–2003); WPXO-LP (2003–2009); WPXO-LD (2009–2025)
- Former channel numbers: Analog: 23 (UHF, 1993–1999), 34 (UHF, 1999–2001, 2002–2009), 31 (UHF, 2001–2002); Digital: 34 (UHF, 2009–2017)
- Former affiliations: The Box (1993–1996); Infomercials (1996-1998); Pax TV/i/Ion (1998–2007); CV Network (2007–2012); MundoFox/MundoMax (2012–2016); América TeVé (2016–2023); Jewelry Television (2023–2024); Purple TV (2024–2025)

Technical information
- Licensing authority: FCC
- Facility ID: 14311
- Class: LD
- ERP: 0.3 kW
- HAAT: 130.9 m (429 ft)
- Transmitter coordinates: 40°48′7.1″N 74°14′45.5″W

Links
- Public license information: LMS

WNYX-LD (channel 34) is a low-power television station licensed to East Orange, New Jersey, United States, serving the New York City area. The station is owned by SagamoreHill Broadcasting. WNYX-LD's transmitter is located on Orange Mountain in West Orange, New Jersey.

== History ==
WNYX began as a 24-hour music channel called The Box on channel 23 with the call letters W23BA. In 1996, Craig L. Fox sold the station to Paxson Communications, which made it a translator for WHAI-TV, its station in Bridgeport, Connecticut. After Paxson acquired WPXN-TV to serve as its New York outlet, the company sold off the Bridgeport station (which has since become WZME) and made W23BA a translator of WPXN. The following year, it moved to channel 34 due to potential interference from WHSI-TV (now WFTY-DT), which had been assigned channel 23 for its digital signal.

On September 11, 2001, the transmitter facilities of WPXN, along with six other New York City television stations and several radio stations, were destroyed when two hijacked airplanes crashed into the World Trade Center towers. The next day, the Federal Communications Commission (FCC) authorized W23BA to temporarily move its signal to channel 31, boost its power to 240 kW, and change its call letters to W31CK to replace WPXN's signal. When WPXN-TV returned to the air with a new transmitter on the Empire State Building in 2002, W31CK's signal moved back to channel 34 and was assigned W34CP as its new call letters. A year later, the station became WPXO-LP.

In August 2007, WPXO was sold to Caribevision Station Group, LLC. It relaunched on September 11, 2007, as an affiliate of the new network CaribeVision. The station's programming consisted mainly of Argentinian and Brazilian telenovelas (Yago, pasión morena, Mi primer amor—originally known in Argentina as Romeo y Julieta, etc.), talk shows (Margarita, te voy a contar), sitcoms (Here's Lucy, Poné a Francella), infomercials during the mornings, and public domain cartoons on weekends.

During the week of May 4, 2009, WPXO-LP turned off its analog signal and began test broadcasts on digital channel 34. By late May, WPXO was transmitting its programming full-time on the digital channel.

Logo as MundoFox

On July 31, 2012, the CaribeVision network was dissolved and the station became a charter affiliate of MundoFox, which started broadcasting the next day; to provide full-market coverage of the station, it was also simulcast on Fox Television Stations-owned WWOR-DT4. The station was added to Cablevision, Verizon Fios, and Time Warner Cable. The network was renamed MundoMax in 2015 after Fox left the network's partnership; FTS ended the simulcast on WWOR-DT4 shortly thereafter.

Logo as "MundoMax New York", used from August 2015 until leaving the network on August 1, 2016

WPXO-LD's affiliation with MundoMax ended on August 1, 2016. At that time, América Tevé, which had been seen on the station's second digital subchannel, was moved to WPXO's primary channel. MundoMax did not have an affiliate in New York for the last four months of its existence; the network ceased operations on November 30, 2016.

The station was licensed to move its signal to digital channel 4 (the former analog channel allocation of WNBC) effective September 6, 2017.

On May 3, 2023, it was announced that WPXO would be sold to SagamoreHill Broadcasting for $405,000 due to Caribevision Holdings, Inc., the station's then-owner's debt. The deal was finalized in late 2023, and the station was converted to a Jewelry Television affiliate.

In 2024, the station became an affiliate of Purple TV.

On May 28, 2025, WPXO-LD switched its call sign to WNYX-LD.

== Subchannels ==
Subchannels of WNYX-LD
Subchannel	Res.	Short name	Programming
34.1	480i	WNYX-LD	Infomercials
34.2	480i	ShopLc	Shop LC
34.3	480i	JTV	Jewelry TV (4:3)
