= Teleunión =

Television station in Santiago de los Caballeros, Dominican Republic

- Type: Free-to-air
- Country: Dominican Republic
- Headquarters: Santiago de los Caballeros

Programming
- Language: Spanish
- Picture format: 1080i HDTV; (downscaled to 480i for the SD feed)

Ownership
- Owner: Grupo Anthony Marte
- Sister channels: Megavision Channel 2.1 All Cibao Region

History
- Launched: December 18, 1992; 33 years ago

Links
- Website: teleuniontvrd.com

Availability

Terrestrial
- Analog UHF: Channels 45 and 53
- Digital VHF/UHF: Channel 12.1 ATSC

Teleunión is a Dominican television station licensed to Santiago de los Caballeros. The station started broadcasting on December 18, 1992 and is owned by Grupo CAM and has relay stations across the country.

== History ==
Antonio Marte started Teleunión in 1992 on UHF channel 16. In 2009, it became the first Dominican local station to be carried by satellite, using the Satmex-5 satellite for its delivery. This enabled the station to start signing an agreement with the Puerto Rico-Floridian network Mega TV in May 2009, with Venevision International as a mediator. In October 2009, Teleunión's programs were being carried on a subchannel of WSJU-TV, after the main station left Mega TV. The subchannel rebroadcast its key programs (Esta Noche Tu Night, Paparazzi TV Sensacional, María Elvira Live, La Descarga con Alvita etc.) over-the-air in San Juan.

In 2017, the station became the new carrier of Detrás de la Noticia, after a scandal between presenter Esteban Rosario and UHF outlet Nexxo led to its removal.

In March 2022, the station announced that it, alongside sister CAM network Megavisión and radio station Clave FM, won the rights to the 42nd edition of Baloncesto Superior de Santiago.

On November 20, 2024, Teleunión moved to channel 12, as part of its digitization efforts.
