= List of programs broadcast by MundoMax =

The following is a list of programs broadcast on MundoMax, a defunct Spanish-language broadcast television network owned by the Colombian broadcaster RCN Televisión and aimed at adults between the ages of 18 and 34. The network soft-launched on August 1, 2012 and officially debuted on August 13, 2012.

== Final programming ==
=== Telenovelas ===
- A Mano Limpia (August 13 – December 2012)
- Asi Es La Vida
- Amor De Contrabando
- Lado A Lado
- La Vida Sigue
- Rastros De Mentiras
- La Guerrera
- Azúcar
- Chepe Fortuna (August 13, 2012 – January 2013)
- Cumbia Ninja (January 26, 2014 – 2014)
- Diomedes
- El Capo (August 1, 2012 – 2016)
- El Hombre de tu Vida (August 1, 2012 – November 2012)
- José do Egito
- El Joe, la leyenda (August 13 – December 2012)
- El Laberinto De Alicia
- Escuadrón del Aire: Naturaleza (2016)
- Heroes Al Rescate: Puro Destino (2016)
- La Guerrera
- Kdabra (August 1, 2012 - 2013)
- Las Detectivas y El Victor (August 13, 2012 – January 2013)
- Las Santisimas (August 13, 2012 – January 2013)
- Los Exitosos Perez (August 13 – December 2012)
- Lynch (August 1, 2012 – 2012)
- Mentes en Shock (August 13, 2012 – 2013)
- Los Milagros de Jesús (2015)
- Pobres Rico (August 13, 2012 – January 2013)
- El Rey David (April 29 – December 2013)
- Suleiman, El Gran Sultan
- Tiempo final (August 13, 2012 – 2016)
- Tres Caínes (March 6 – June 21, 2013)
- Yo Soy Betty, La Fea (August 13, 2012 – 2015)

Programming produced by Univision for MundoMax:

=== Game shows ===
- 100 Latinos Dijeron (September 9, 2013 – November 30, 2016)
- Atrévete a Cantar (March 18, 2013)
- Minuto Para Ganar (August 13, 2012 – November 30, 2016)

=== Reality shows ===
- El Factor X (July 29, 2013 – September 2016)
- Protagonistas de Nuestra Tele (2013)

=== News programming ===
- Noticias MundoFox (August 13, 2012 – July 27, 2015)

=== Lifestyle programming ===
- Cocineros (August 4, 2012 – 2014)
- Estilo de Vida (August 18, 2012 – 2016)
- Luz en Casa (August 18, 2012 – 2013)
- Manual de Supervivencia (August 18, 2012 – 2016)
- El Sabor de los Oficios (August 18, 2012 – 2016)
- Sabores de Familia (August 18, 2012 – 2014)
- Tu Vida Más Simple (August 4, 2012 – 2016)

=== Sports programming ===
- Premier League (August 25, 2012 – 2016)
- Copa Sudamericana (2012–2016)
- Copa Libertadores (2012–2016)
- Golden Boy Promotions (August 18, 2012 – 2016)
- UEFA Champions League (2012–2015)
- La Ultima Palabra (August 13, 2012 – 2016)

=== Children's programming ===
==== MundoMax Kids ====
- Are We There Yet?: World Adventure (August 5, 2012 – May 25, 2014)
- Artzooka! (August 3, 2014 – November 27, 2016)
- Finding Stuff Out (2015–November 27, 2016)
- Iggy Arbuckle (August 5, 2012 – July 27, 2014)
- The Zula Patrol (August 5, 2012 – July 27, 2014)
- It's a Big Big World (2015–November 27, 2016)
- Making Stuff (June 1, 2014 – 2015)
- Mama Mirabelle's Home Movies (August 5, 2012 – July 27, 2014)
- Toot & Puddle (August 5, 2012 – July 27, 2014)
- Wibbly Pig (August 3, 2014 – November 27, 2016)

==== XtremaMax ====
- Transformers: Prime (2015–November 27, 2016)
- Transformers: Rescue Bots (2015–November 27, 2016)
