= WQBS =

WQBS may refer to:

- WQBS (AM), a radio station (870 AM) licensed to serve San Juan, Puerto Rico
- WQBS-FM, a radio station (107.7 FM) licensed to serve Carolina, Puerto Rico
