= WSJU =

WSJU may refer to:

- WSJU-LD, a low-power television station (channel 32) licensed to serve Ceiba, Puerto Rico
- WSJU-TV, a defunct television station (channel 31) formerly licensed to serve San Juan, Puerto Rico
