= WIOA (disambiguation) =

WIOA may refer to:

- WIOA, a radio station in San Juan, Puerto Rico
- Workforce Innovation and Opportunity Act (WIOA), an American public law pertaining to workforce development
