= The Knee Diaries =

- Created by: Alimorad Farshchian
- Starring: Kimberly Ann Jones; Andy Guze
- Country of origin: United States
- Original language: English
- No. of episodes: 2

Production
- Executive producer: Maria Barba
- Running time: 30 minutes

Original release
- Network: CaribeVision
- Release: December 10, 2007 – present

The Knee Diaries is a documentary series that focuses on various cases of muscular-skeleton ailments, joint injuries and arthritis. Created by Alimorad Farshchian and produced by CaribeVision, the series is hosted by Andy Guze and Kimberly Ann Jones.
