= WBWP-LD =

Television station in West Palm Beach, Florida

- West Palm Beach, Florida; United States
- Channels: Digital: 19 (UHF); Virtual: 19

Programming
- Affiliations: see § Subchannels

Ownership
- Owner: SagamoreHill Broadcasting; (Roseland Broadcasting, Inc.)

History
- First air date: November 1999
- Former call signs: W53AL (CP, 1988–1998); W57CX (1998–2000); WBWP-LP (2000–2011)
- Former channel numbers: Analog: 57 (UHF, 1999–2011); Digital: 25 (UHF, 2011–2020); Virtual: 57 (2011–2022)
- Former affiliations: English-language independent (2003–2004); Spanish independent (2004–2007, 2016–2021); Mega TV (2007–2012); MundoFox/MundoMax (2012–2016); Infomercials (2021–2024)

Technical information
- Licensing authority: FCC
- Facility ID: 56130
- Class: LD
- ERP: 9 kW
- HAAT: 152 m (499 ft)
- Transmitter coordinates: 26°47′59.7″N 80°4′31.7″W

Links
- Public license information: LMS

WBWP-LD (channel 19) is a low-power television station in West Palm Beach, Florida, United States. The station is owned by SagamoreHill Broadcasting. WBWP-LD's transmitter is located on Old Dixie Highway in Lake Park, Florida.

== History ==
WBWP-LP, then on channel 57, began broadcasting by November 1999. In May 2003, it relaunched as a locally based independent station with up to 35 hours a week of local programs and an affiliation with the Omni Broadcasting Network. These included the Spanish-language series La Vida en Florida and a sports talk show, Inside Sports. The centerpiece of its programming was Good Morning Florida, a talk show co-hosted by veteran West Palm Beach news anchor Bob Nichols. An investor in the station in this era was Dan Ross, a former NFL player.

On August 15, 2004, WBWP-LP went to a full-time Spanish-language format, though it suffered damage from Hurricane Jeanne and did not fully relaunch until October. It began broadcasting Mega TV in 2007.

== Subchannels ==
The station's signal is multiplexed:

Subchannels of WBWP-LD
Subchannel	Res.	Short name	Programming
19.1	720p	WBWP-LD	Purple TV
19.2	480i	DstarSP	Daystar Español
19.3	480i	Catchy	Catchy Comedy
19.4	480i	Movies	Movies!
19.5	480i	Heroes	Daystar
19.6	480i	SonLife	Sonlife
19.7	480i	ShopLC	Shop LC
19.8	480i	Toons	MeTV Toons
