= Fox News (disambiguation) =

Fox News is an American multinational conservative news and political commentary television channel and website.

Fox News may also refer to:

- Fox News (1919–1930), a silent-era theatrical newsreel created by William Fox
- Fox News, a term used by some Fox Broadcasting Company stations and affiliates to brand their own local news operations
- Fox News Radio, an American radio network owned by Fox News
- Fox News Sunday, a talk show on the Fox network as a presentation of Fox News Channel
- Fox News Talk, a satellite radio service of Fox News Channel
- Fox Movietone News, a newsreel which began in 1928 in the United Kingdom and the United States

== See also ==
- Lists of Fox television affiliates
- Noticias MundoFox, national news division of the former Spanish-language network MundoFox
