= Pablo Kleinman =

American businessman and commentator

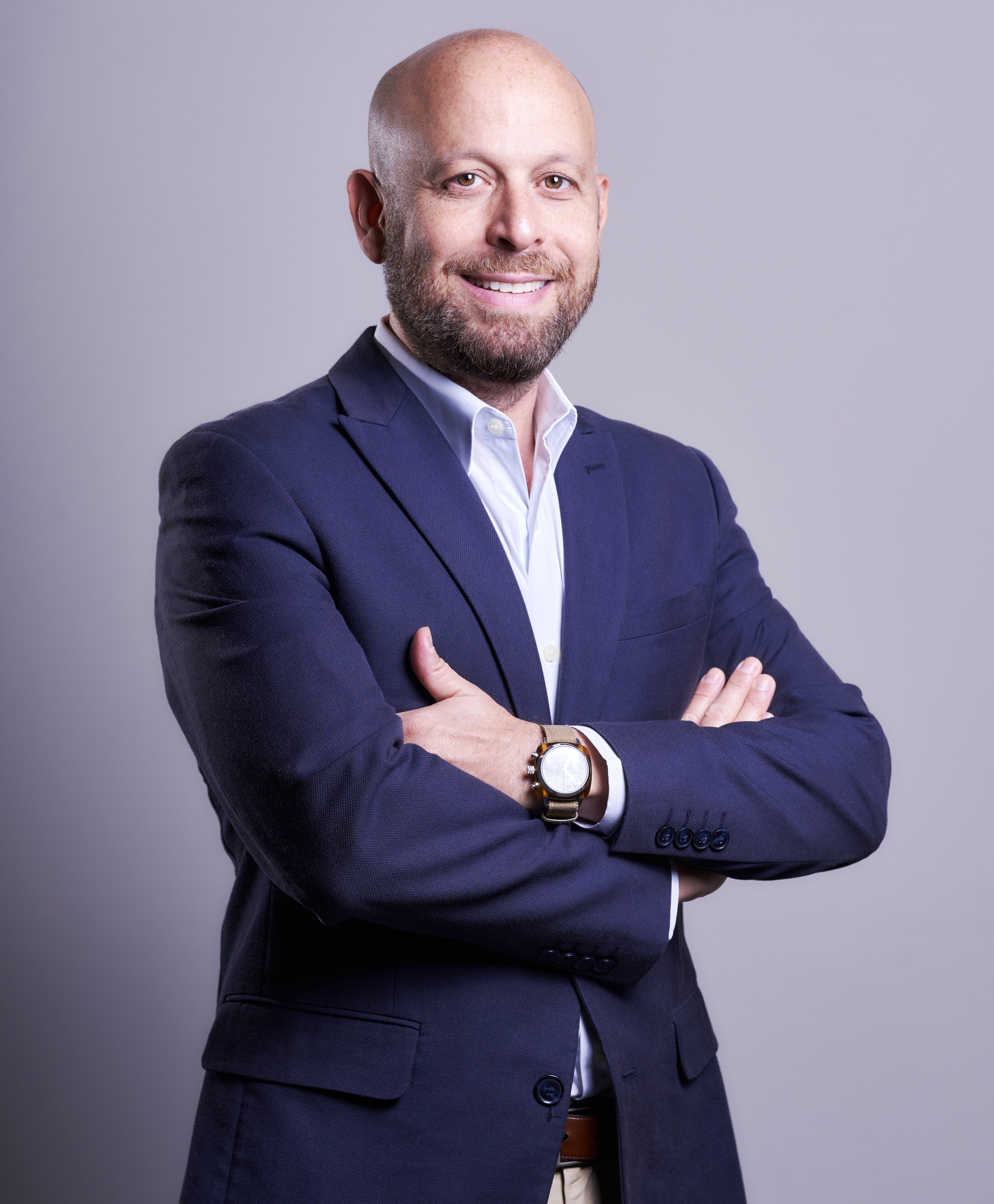
- Born: 1971 (age 54–55); Buenos Aires, Argentina
- Education: University of Southern California (BA); HEC Paris (MBA); London Business School
- Occupations: Entrepreneur, talk show host, political commentator
- Political party: Republican
- Spouse: Rose Kleinman (m. 2016)
- Children: 2

Pablo Kleinman (born 1971) is an Argentine-American entrepreneur and talk show host who was involved in the development of online services in Latin America. Until January 6, 2021, he was the host of Radio California Libre (Radio Free California), produced by Univision's Los Angeles flagship talk radio KTNQ. He is a co-founder and former Chief Operating Officer at VOZ, a Dallas-based U.S. Hispanic media company.

He graduated from the USC School of International Relations (USC, Los Angeles) and went on to study at the London Business School and at the HEC School of Management in Paris, where he obtained an MBA. He was a Republican Party official in California and ran for in Congress in 2014 in the old 30th congressional district, which then encompassed a majority of the San Fernando Valley.

== Early life ==
Kleinman was born in Argentina into a family of Polish-Jewish and Ukrainian-Jewish origin. His maternal family began to arrive in Argentina at the end of the 19th century from Odessa. His grandfather lived in Colonia Mauricio, in Buenos Aires Province, a village of Jewish gauchos founded by the Jewish Colonization Association.

He has spoken before about being the descendant of several rabbinic dynasties and about his family's Davidic lineage and history over several centuries in different parts of Europe, including Medieval Italy and pre-1492 Spain.

He attended elementary school in Buenos Aires and finished the first year at the Colegio Nacional de Buenos Aires before he immigrated to the United States at age 13, settling in Los Angeles with his parents and siblings. Previously his great-grandmother had arrived in the United States via Ellis Island in the 1930s, and his extended family has kept a permanent presence in Southern California since the 1940s. Since 2017 he has resided in Miami with his wife and children.

== Technology work ==
In 1986, at age 15, Kleinman set up an electronic bulletin board system (BBS) in Buenos Aires called "TCC: The Computer Connection" which was one of the first in the region and the first to run under a Microsoft-designed platform. A year later, TCC became FidoCenter, the first node of the worldwide FidoNet network in Latin America. Kleinman was the coordinator of FidoNet for the whole of Latin America (FidoNet's Zone 4) between 1987 and 1991. During that period, FidoNet became the largest public-access computer network in the region. It grew throughout the different countries and reached several hundreds of access points in dozens of Latin American cities.

As FidoNet's coordinator for Latin America, Kleinman was the only foreign participant, invited by the Brazilian region, at the network's first national sysop meeting in Rio de Janeiro in August 1990, where its founding guidelines were agreed.

During the years he spent helping grow FidoNet, Kleinman also engaged in computer network hacking using the pseudonym Doctor Trucho. Under this identity, he was a co-founder of Piratas Unidos Argentinos, the first hacker group in Latin America.

Many of the original participants of FidoNet in Latin America became the pioneers of the Internet in the following years. Kleinman was an active participant of the first Spanish-language newsgroups and was one of the founders of several of the Usenet groups dedicated to Latin American countries. Shortly after and during the following ten years, he participated in the founding of several online services companies, among them, Urbita Network, a series of travel and local-information online websites and apps with several million active users.

== Journalism and media ==
Kleinman began working as a journalist in 1989 as Latin American correspondent for Billboard magazine, its first to cover the region.

In 2004, he founded and became editor-in-chief of Diario de América, the oldest political-opinion journal edited in Spanish in the United States. Around the same time, he became a syndicated writer, with columns regularly published in newspapers throughout Latin America and Spain, such as Chile's El Mercurio and La Nación, Panama's Panamá América and La Prensa, Nicaragua's La Prensa, Peru's El Comercio, Paraguay's Diario ABC Color, Venezuela's Diario 2001, Uruguay's El País, Costa Rica's La Nación, among others, as well as in the United States and the Middle East. Kleinman is also a frequent commentator on a few Spanish-language current affairs television programs, including the nighttime news on the Telemundo Network's Los Angeles station. He has also been featured on English-language television newscasts in the U.S. and Canada, usually talking about Latin American issues.

In April 2013, Kleinman became publisher of El Medio, the first Spanish-language political opinion journal about the Middle East. The magazine became known for espousing a pro-Western editorial line, something uncommon among most Spanish-language publications. It featured points of view generally favorable to the United States, to Israel, and to supporters of liberal democracy throughout the Middle East.

Kleinman regularly guest hosted the daily current affairs show, initially just on Los Angeles's KTNQ and later also on Univision's nationwide talk radio network, Univision America, between 2009 and 2014. He later hosted his own talk show, Radio California Libre (Radio Free California) on Univision's KTNQ until it was cancelled, ostensibly for political reasons, a day after the 2021 United States Capitol attack.

== Political career ==
Kleinman describes himself as being politically center-right. In early 2009, he took to organizing the Fundación Californiana, a Section 501(c)(3) educational charity dedicated to reaffirming the notion of Hispanics as part of the mainstream of American society, primarily through its Romualdo Pacheco Initiative, and to educating the public on the principles of individual self-reliance and market economics in both English and Spanish.

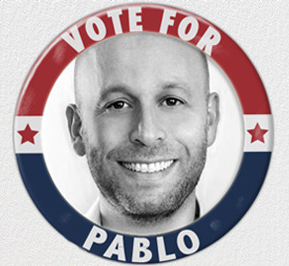
Pablo Kleinman for Congress 2014 Campaign Button

In February 2014, Kleinman announced that he was running for United States Congress in California's 30th congressional district, against long-time incumbent Democrat Brad Sherman. Despite the poor brand image of the Republican Party in Los Angeles and the local trend of moderate Republicans running as Independents, Kleinman ran in the primary as a GOP candidate, describing himself as a "new generation Republican". Kleinman's campaign as the first Hispanic Jewish candidate in a heavily Jewish and Hispanic district generated attention by the media in an area where Democrats have won every election for many years. As a political outsider, he encountered difficulty getting endorsements from members of the Republican establishment, although he did secure prominent endorsements from conservative talk radio hosts as well as from well-known local community figures. Kleinman lost the June 3rd, 2014, primary.

Kleinman's campaign embraced libertarian principles on social issues such as gay rights, a pro-Israel foreign policy and a push for the official recognition of the Armenian Genocide by the United States government, which took place five years later.

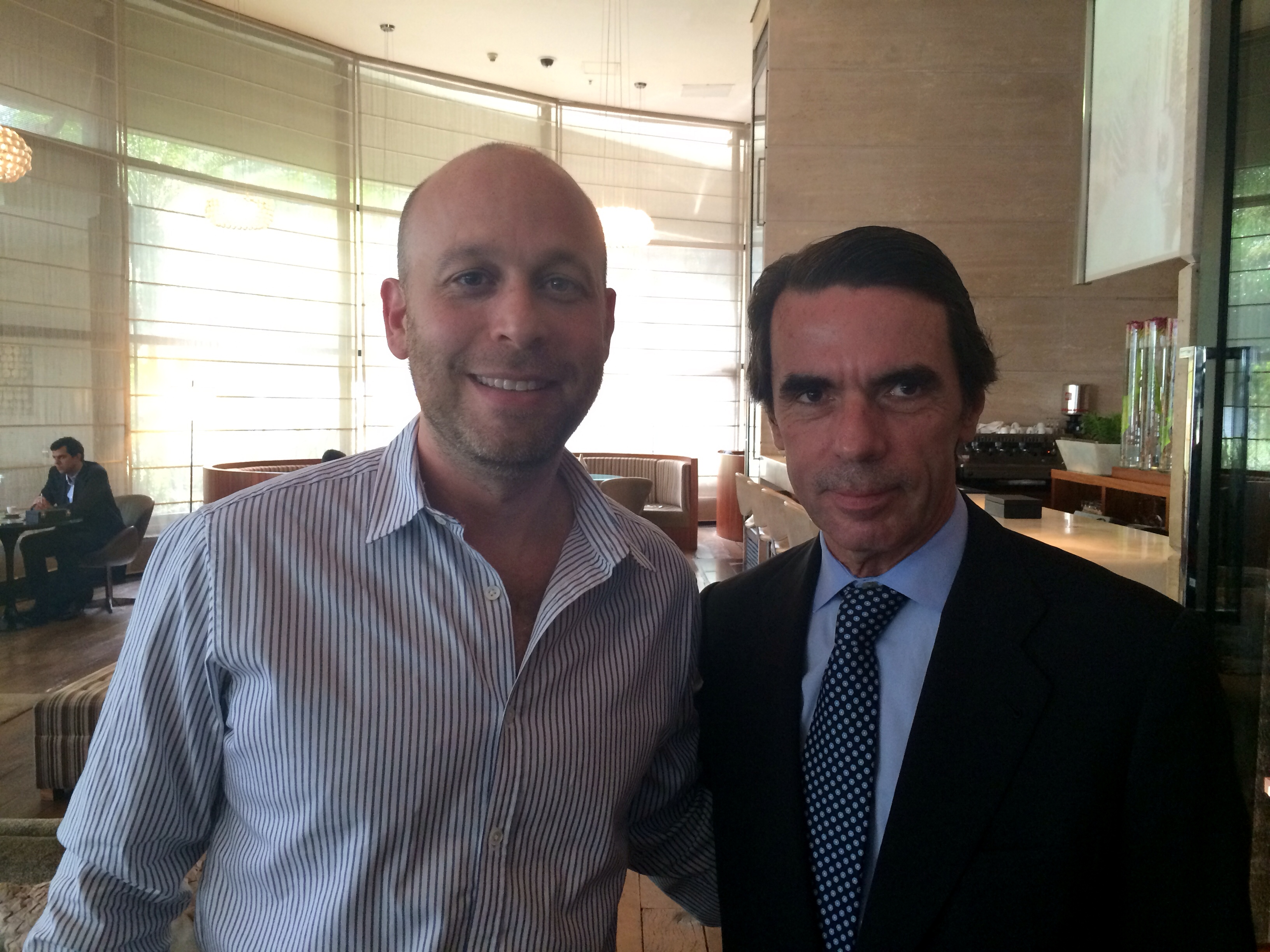
Pablo Kleinman and Spanish PM José María Aznar

He is a former delegate and member of the executive committee of the California Republican Party. On June 7, 2016, he was elected to the central committee of the Los Angeles County Republican Party for a four-year (2016–2020) term.

Kleinman signed the Madrid Charter, a document drafted by the conservative Spanish political party Vox that describes left-wing groups as enemies of Iberian America involved in a "criminal project" that are "under the umbrella of the Cuban regime".

== Philanthropy ==
Kleinman is Vice Chairman and a Member of the Board of Trustees of the Hispanic Jewish Foundation in Spain, which is building the Hispanic-Jewish Museum in Madrid. He is also the president of a sister charity based in Miami, called the Hispanic-Jewish Endowment.
