= Bayly (talk show) =

- Created by: Spanish Broadcasting System
- Directed by: Jaime Bayly
- Presented by: Jaime Bayly
- Country of origin: United States
- Original language: Spanish

Production
- Production locations: Key West, Monroe
- Running time: 60 min. (with commercials)
- Production company: Spanish Broadcasting System

Original release
- Network: Mega TV
- Release: September 6, 2006 – present

Bayly is a late-night talk show hosted by Peruvian journalist Jaime Bayly on Mega TV in the United States.

== History ==
The show debuted on September 4, 2006 as a monologue in which Jaime Bayly discussed politics and interviewed international celebrities.

In 2008 the show won the Suncoast regional Emmy, in the category of "Talent camera commentator and editorialist".

In July 2009, the host did not renew his contract with Mega TV, and the program was cancelled.

In October 2010 Raul Alarcón called Jaime Bayly to return to WSBS-TV/Mega TV with the same show, but with a new concept: stage and celebrity interviews. He suggested that they set aside their political differences.

Since July 2011 the show has been distributed by NTN 24 in DirecTV for Colombia, Ecuador, Argentina, Uruguay, Chile and Peru by Cablevision for Costa Rica and Sky to Mexico.
