= WGDL =

Radio station in Lares, Puerto Rico

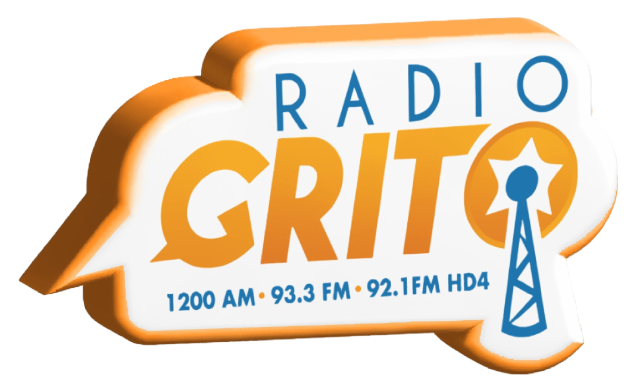
- Lares, Puerto Rico; Puerto Rico
- Broadcast area: Puerto Rico
- Frequency: 1200 kHz
- Branding: Radio Grito

Programming
- Format: Spanish Variety
- Affiliations: Red Informativa de PR

Ownership
- Owner: Lares Broadcasting Corporation
- Sister stations: WMAA-LP

History
- First air date: September 23, 1986; 40 years ago
- Call sign meaning: Grito De Lares

Technical information
- Licensing authority: FCC
- Facility ID: 36564
- Class: B
- Power: 20,000 watts
- Transmitter coordinates: 18°17′40″N 66°53′50″W
- Translator: 93.3 W227DR (Aguadilla)
- Repeater: 92.1 WZET-HD4 (Hormigueros)

Links
- Public license information: Public file; LMS
- Webcast: Lidten Live
- Website: radiogrito.com

WGDL (1200 AM and translator W227DR 93.3 FM, "Radio Grito") is a radio station broadcasting a Spanish Variety format. Licensed to Lares, Puerto Rico, it serves the Puerto Rico area. The station is owned by Lares Broadcasting Corporation.

== History ==
WGDL signed on September 23, 1986. It began operating at night in 1991 under a long-term special temporary authority, made possible by the move of HIBS "Radio Dial" in San Pedro de Macorís, Dominican Republic, to 670 kHz. The station's news programming comes from Red Informativa de Puerto Rico and sister station Red 93.7 FM. The station rebroadcasts all of its programming on 93.3 FM.

== Translator stations ==
Broadcast translator for WGDL
Call sign	Frequency	City of license	FID	ERP (W)	FCC info
W227DR	93.3 FM	Aguadilla, Puerto Rico	200821	.225	LMS
