= WGEN-TV =

Television station in Key West, Florida

- Key West–Miami–Fort Lauderdale, Florida; United States
- City: Key West, Florida
- Channels: Digital: 8 (VHF); Virtual: 8
- Branding: Estrella TV Canal 8; Noticias 8

Programming
- Affiliations: 8.1: Estrella TV; for others, see § Subchannels

Ownership
- Owner: MediaCo; (Estrella Television License LLC)

History
- Founded: May 3, 1991
- First air date: May 26, 1996
- Former call signs: WWFD (1996–2000); WWTU (2000–2002); WVIB (2002–2004)
- Former channel numbers: Analog: 8 (VHF, 1996–2009); Digital: 12 (VHF, until 2009)
- Former affiliations: Portuguese Ind. (1996–2006); Spanish Ind. (2006–2012, 2017–2018); MundoFox/MundoMax (2012–2016); Azteca América (2016–2017)

Technical information
- Licensing authority: FCC
- Facility ID: 27387
- ERP: 7 kW
- HAAT: 55.9 m (183 ft)
- Transmitter coordinates: 24°33′19.8″N 81°48′4.5″W
- Translator(s): see § Translators

Links
- Public license information: Public file; LMS

WGEN-TV (channel 8) is a television station licensed to Key West, Florida, United States, broadcasting the Spanish-language Estrella TV network to the Miami–Fort Lauderdale television market. Owned-and-operated by MediaCo, WGEN-TV's studios are located on Northwest 75th Street in Miami's Medley neighborhood, and its transmitter is located on Southard Street in Key West.

WGEN-TV's over-the-air broadcasting radius only covers the western Florida Keys. Therefore, it is relayed through a network of four low-power translator stations throughout the area, including Miami-licensed W08EV-D, and also relies on cable and satellite carriage to reach the entire South Florida market.

== History ==
The station first signed on the air on May 26, 1996, as WWFD. During the 1990s, the station broadcast in Portuguese with programming aimed at the area's Brazilian population. Channel 8 subsequently changed its call letters to WWTU on February 8, 2000, then to WVIB on February 8, 2002, and finally to its current calls as WGEN-TV on July 1, 2004. Prior to December 2005, WGEN was, under the ownership of Sonia Broadcasting, co-owned with another Key West station, WDLP-TV (channel 22, now WSBS-TV).

In December 2005, WGEN came under the control of Colombian broadcaster Caracol Televisión, which holds a 25% ownership stake in Mapale LLC, the maximum allowed by Federal Communications Commission (FCC) regulations regarding foreign ownership of terrestrial stations. On September 18, 2006, Caracol relaunched the station under the "GenTV" brand and began serving as its primary program supplier; programming on WGEN included Colombian and Brazilian telenovelas, a Colombian-produced news program (Noticias Caracol), and a local version of Desafío 20.06, a reality show similar to Survivor.

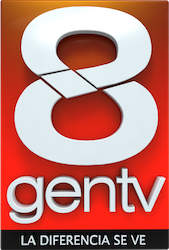
Logo as GenTV

On December 28, 2012, at 8 p.m. Eastern Time, MundoFox moved its Miami affiliation from WJAN-CD (channel 41) to WGEN-TV. While WGEN-TV was controlled by and aired programming from Caracol, as a MundoFox affiliate, it shared an indirect connection with another Colombian network as MundoFox was initially half-owned by the competing RCN Televisión; in July 2015, RCN Televisión acquired Fox's stake in MundoFox and decided to rebrand the network as MundoMax on August 13 of that same year. RCN content came from the network feed of MundoMax, while Caracol programming is distributed directly to WGEN-TV through Mapale LLC. WGEN-TV formerly aired national newscasts from MundoFox through Noticias MundoFox, which used the resources of NTN24, RCN's sister network and international Spanish-language news channel (MundoFox ended its national newscasts in July 2015, after RCN purchasing the network). On December 1, 2016, following the shutdown of MundoMax, WGEN-TV became an affiliate of Azteca América. In November 2017, Azteca América returned to its previous affiliate in the market, WPMF-CD (channel 38); WGEN-TV then returned to the "GenTV" branding and a Spanish independent lineup reliant on Caracol programming.

On January 5, 2018, Radio & Television Business Report reported that Mapale LLC was in the process of filing an application to sell WGEN-TV to Liberman Broadcasting (which was renamed Estrella Media in February 2020, following a corporate reorganization of the company under private equity firm HPS Investment Partners, LLC); following the sale, the station would become an owned-and-operated station of Estrella TV, restoring a full-market outlet for the network after its previous affiliate, the second digital subchannel of WSVN (channel 7), switched to Light TV on July 14, 2017. Liberman confirmed the purchase on January 8, 2018, and announced that the station would join Estrella TV on March 1 under a 'soft launch' period. The sale was completed on March 16, 2018, officially becoming "Estrella TV Canal 8".

== Past programming ==
As of December 2012, locally produced and outsourced programs broadcast by WGEN-TV include ALAIN, Una Mano Amiga, El Show con Tony Benítez and Club 10. Among the notable programs broadcast by WGEN-TV include: Desafío 20.06, ¿Quién manda a quién? (a remake of Who's the Boss?, produced by Caracol and Sony Pictures Television), La boca loca de Paul (hosted by Paul Bouche), La ex and María Elvira. Caracol Televisión-produced and locally-produced programming were removed from the schedule upon Liberman taking control of the station in March 2018, and currently outside of local paid programming, the Estrella TV schedule runs in full.

=== Newscasts ===
WGEN-TV previously broadcast five hours of locally produced newscasts each week (with one hour on weekdays), under the branding of Noticias 8 with the cooperation of its partial Caracol ownership. In 2012, WGEN began broadcasting its local newscasts in high definition. WGEN moved its half-hour weeknight 5 p.m. newscast to 6 p.m. on December 1, once it became an affiliate of Azteca America, rebranding as Hechos Miami 8 to reflect the network's news franchise, Hechos. WGEN was one of the few MundoMax affiliates (if not the only one) to keep its news department after that network shut down its news operation.

Liberman shut down the news operation upon taking control of the station due to its connection to Caracol being severed and considered an audit of WGEN's existing news staff for an eventual relaunch. The Liberman bankruptcy that was filed in November 2018 however likely put these plans on hold, and no further announcements have been made about the return of news to WGEN.

== Technical information ==
=== Subchannels ===
The station's signal is multiplexed:

Subchannels of WGEN-TV
Subchannel	Res.	Short name	Programming
8.1	720p	ESTRELA	Estrella TV
8.2	720p	E-NEWS	Shop LC
8.3	480i	SHOP-HQ	ShopHQ
8.4	480i	SHOP-LC	Shop LC
8.5	480i	BARS	[Blank]
8.6	480i	BARS	[Blank]

=== Analog-to-digital conversion ===
WGEN-TV ended programming on its analog signal, on VHF channel 8, on June 12, 2009, the official date on which full-power television stations in the United States transitioned from analog to digital broadcasts under federal mandate. The station's digital signal relocated from its pre-transition VHF channel 12 to channel 8.

=== Translators ===
WGEN-TV's signal is relayed on four translator stations in the Miami area and the Florida Keys.

Translators of WGEN-TV
Call sign	City of; license	Channel	ERP	HAAT	Facility ID	Transmitter; coordinates
W12DI-D	Key West	12	0.3 kW	55.5 m (182 ft)	168058	24°33′19.8″N 81°48′04.5″W
W18EU-D	Miami	18	15 kW	247.6 m (812 ft)	4332	25°59′10″N 80°11′36.3″W
W08EW-D	Miami	8	3 kW	165.7 m (544 ft)	168060	25°46′25.8″N 80°11′16.7″W
W08EV-D	Miami	8	3 kW	253.6 m (832 ft)	6040	25°59′10″N 80°11′36.3″W

As of March 1, 2018, Liberman's WVFW-LD (channel 34), which had carried Estrella TV previously, became a sister station to WGEN, but continues to carry the network due to WGEN's transmitter location.

W21CL-D was established before 1979 as W65AP, until forced to move out of the 700 MHz band by the digital television transition. W17DG-D was also established before 1979, as was W63AL, which was briefly W23BG from late 1990 to early 1991. WDLP-CA began operations in 1992 as W21BD, which was deleted in June 1994 after its permit expired, and restored the following December. In April 2003, its license was upgraded to Class A status and its calls were changed to WGEN-CA; it was then changed to WDLP-CA the following month, and later to WDLP-CD on August 11, 2011.

W49CL and WGEN-LP in Miami are both now listed as having WSBS-TV in Key West as their parent station, indicating that they may be leased to that station. Both are still owned by WGEN-TV owner Mapale, which does not identify them on the GenTV website's station map. Their successor "digital companion channels" respectively are W24DE-D and WGEN-LD, which both rebroadcast WGEN-TV (unlike full-power stations, they are separate facilities, and as LPTV stations they are not required to simulcast the analog feed on digital).

W38AA in Marathon and W39AC in Key West are listed as having WSBS-TV as their primary station, although in the past the two stations had retransmitted Miami CBS owned-and-operated station WFOR-TV (channel 4). Their respective digital companion channels W08ED-D (under construction) and W12DI-D are shown as having WGEN-TV as the primary station, and 12.1 is shown on WGEN's map as an additional channel for Key West (though only analog channel 21 is shown for Marathon). Because Key West and even Marathon are well within the broadcast range of both WSBS and WGEN, it is unclear why this would be necessary (or in Key West, useful at all), given the total flatness of the terrain and water and the complete lack of other obstructions like tall buildings. The only advantage for WSBS is to continue to be seen on analog television.

All translator stations are owned by Mapale (from the Colombian music genre Mapalé) as they have always been. Digital stations (ending in -D, -LD, or -CD) may use virtual channel 8.1 as the main station does, or may use their physical (RF) channel numbers as their virtual channel. The -CA or -CD suffixes indicate Class A protection from other stations.

On April 13, 2017, the Federal Communications Commission (FCC) announced that WDLP-CD was a successful bidder in the spectrum auction, and would be surrendering its license in exchange for $3,673,224. Mapale LLC surrendered WDLP-CD's license to the FCC for cancellation on June 5, 2017.

W24DE-D's license was cancelled by the FCC on March 12, 2020. W08ED-D's license was surrendered to the FCC and cancelled on May 24, 2023. W21CL-D's license was surrendered to the FCC and cancelled on July 7, 2023.
