= Daniel Sentinelli =

Daniel Santinelli
- Born: 1965 (age 60–61); Buenos Aires
- Known for: being part of the hacking movement of Argentina and being one of the first Argentine hackers to reveal his identity

Daniel "El Chacal" Sentinelli (Buenos Aires, September 1965) is an Argentine hacker. He was one of the first hackers from the country to make his identity public, after he demonstrated for the FBI how easy it was to invade secret networks from the American Government.

== Life ==
El Chacal began his activities as a hacker during the 80s. He was one of the founding members of Piratas Unidos Argentinos in 1986. He was also part of the First Hacking Congress in Argentina, where he spoke about data cryptography using PGP.

In the 90s, worried about the invasion of secret networks from the American government, the FBI sent one of their agents to their basis in Montevideo. El Chacal revealed his identity and made a public demonstration at a cybercafe on Belgrano of how easy it was to hack those systems.

Sentinelli was one of the first Argentine hackers to make his identity public. Afterwards, he began working as a security consultant. He has worked for private companies and for the government. He is also a columnist of Dominio Digital.

== Piratas Unidos Argentinos ==
Piratas Unidos Argentinos (PUA), translated as United Argentine Pirates, was the first known hacker group in Argentina and one of the pioneers in Latin America. Founded in 1986 by a group of youths including Sentinelli (alias "El Chacal") and Pablo Kleinman (alias "Doctor Trucho"), the collective focused on exploring and breaching computer systems, contributing to the emergence of hacker culture in the country. They are described as "conscious hackers" who operated collaboratively and self-taught, often working without formal resources in the early days of personal computing, driven by curiosity about modems and emerging digital networks.

=== History ===
The group emerged in mid-1980s Buenos Aires amid the nascent personal computing scene in Argentina, where bulletin board systems (BBS), Delphi, as well as packet switched networks such as ARPAC and CIBA, served as the primary digital platforms. PUA formed as an informal "local hackers' club" of tech-savvy youths fascinated by modems and early networking. They quickly gained notoriety for disrupting network operators through playful intrusions, experiments, and "phreaking" techniques to access international telephone lines and remote systems. Early activities included breaching the Delphi network in the late 1980s, where members manipulated user accounts, explored hidden administrative functions, and even altered billing systems, frustrating U.S.-based operators who viewed them as mischievous intruders. Their most audacious operations occurred in the early 1990s, when they gained unauthorized access to classified U.S. government networks through compromised military contractors and satellite links. This international reach alarmed authorities, prompting the FBI to send an agent to Montevideo, Uruguay—PUA's informal hub for cross-border activities—in 1992. In a bold response, the group organized a public demonstration at a cybercafé in Buenos Aires' Belgrano neighborhood, where they live-hacked a simulated secure system in front of onlookers and media, illustrating the simplicity of such breaches and drawing widespread attention without resulting in arrests. Although members preferred to describe PUA as "a group of friends sharing knowledge and tools" rather than a structured organization, their collaborative ethos and emphasis on ethical exploration inspired similar hacker scenes across Latin America, including youth clubs in Chile, Brazil, and beyond. Activities peaked in the early 1990s but began to decline around 1991 as key members like Pablo Kleinman shifted focus to legitimate pursuits, such as expanding FidoNet infrastructure in Argentina and academic studies in the United States. The group effectively disbanded by the mid-1990s, as members transitioned to professional cybersecurity roles amid increasing legal scrutiny and the commercialization of the internet.

=== Notable members ===
In his early 20s during PUA's formation, Sentinelli specialized in network intrusions, phreaking, and early cryptography. He was among the first Argentine hackers to publicly reveal his identity in the early 1990s, breaking from the anonymity norm. He lectured at Argentina's inaugural Hacking Congress on Pretty Good Privacy (PGP) encryption and its implications for data security. Following PUA's dissolution, Sentinelli became a respected cybersecurity consultant for corporations, financial institutions, and government agencies, while also serving as a columnist for the digital outlet Dominio Digital.

Pablo Kleinman (alias "Doctor Trucho"), co-founder and technical lead responsible for BBS development and international networking. Kleinman played a pivotal role in growing FidoNet in Argentina from 1987 to 1991, facilitating PUA's access to global systems. His departure in 1991 to pursue studies in the U.S. signaled the group's winding down.

=== Legacy ===
PUA symbolizes the dawn of "information guerrilla warfare" in Latin America, bridging amateur curiosity with early debates on digital access, privacy, and cybersecurity ethics. Their largely non-destructive hacks exposed systemic vulnerabilities in banking, telecommunications, and government systems, influencing the development of initial cybersecurity policies and awareness in Argentina. By publicly demonstrating techniques without malice, they helped demystify hacking and encouraged a shift toward "white-hat" practices. Members' subsequent careers in legitimate fields—such as Sentinelli's consulting work and Kleinman's tech ventures—professionalized the local hacker community, mentoring future generations and contributing to Argentina's growing IT sector. The group's story endures as a cultural touchstone in Argentine technological history, chronicled in journalistic accounts and inspiring narratives of youthful innovation amid limited resources, though they faced no major prosecutions unlike more malicious groups that followed.

== Biography ==
- Negro, El Hacker (2019). El Libro Negro del Hacker (in Spanish). Ediciones Digitales Colombia.
