= WOCK-CD =

Television station in Chicago

- Chicago, Illinois; United States
- Channels: Digital: 4 (VHF); Virtual: 13
- Branding: WOCK 13

Programming
- Affiliations: 13.1: Shop LC; for others, see § Subchannels

Ownership
- Owner: KM Communications; (KM LPTV of Chicago-13, L.L.C.)

History
- Founded: August 22, 1984
- Former call signs: W13BE (1984–1994); WOCK-LP (1994–2000); WOCK-CA (2000–2009)
- Former channel numbers: Analog: 13 (VHF, 1984–2009)
- Former affiliations: Independent (1984–1991, 2016–2020); The Box/MTV2 (1991–2001); CCTV (2001–2003); Azteca América (2003–2008); CV Network (2008–2010); Mega TV (2010–2012); MundoFox/MundoMax (2012–2016)
- Call sign meaning: Rock music (for former music video format)

Technical information
- Licensing authority: FCC
- Facility ID: 35092
- Class: CD
- ERP: 3 kW
- HAAT: 390.1 m (1,280 ft)
- Transmitter coordinates: 41°53′56.1″N 87°37′23.2″W

Links
- Public license information: Public file; LMS

WOCK-CD (channel 13) is a low-power, Class A television station in Chicago, Illinois, United States, affiliated with Shop LC. The station is owned by Skokie-based KM Communications. WOCK-CD's studios are located on North Kedzie Avenue in Chicago, and its transmitter is located atop the John Hancock Center.

== History ==
The station was originally assigned the translator call sign of W13BE; it changed to WOCK-LP in 1994, and received Class A status in 2000, making it WOCK-CA.

WOCK was an affiliate of The Box until that network's acquisition by Viacom in 2001, resulting in The Box being merged into MTV2. The station became an affiliate of Florida-based Videomix which aired hip hop music videos, during the mid-summer 2001. That autumn, it began broadcasting programs from China Central Television, carrying a mix of CCTV-4 and CCTV-9 programming provided by China Star TV. It switched to Azteca América in October 2003, and then to CV Network in late 2008.

WOCK-CA received a construction permit to build a low-power digital television station, WOCK-CD, on channel 4, radiating primarily to the southwest. This took to the air at midnight on June 4, 2009, with WOCK then ceasing its analog transmission.

After the transition, WOCK was running the CV Network programming previously seen on the analog signal on virtual channel 13.1, and Korean language programming, simulcast from co-owned WOCH-CA, on virtual channel 13.2. WOCK dropped CV Network for Mega TV on January 11, 2010.

In July 2010, WOCK acquired LATV from WGN-TV, after the latter dropped the network; it shortly after began its run on WOCK-CD's subchannel, 13.3.

In August 2012, WOCK moved MegaTV to 13.5 and began carrying the MundoFox network on the primary 13.1 in HD. They also dropped LATV, which moved to W25DW-D as 25.5. Additionally, WOCK's main signal was picked up by Fox Television Stations on WPWR-TV over their 50.3 digital subchannel, both to provide a full-power over-the-air signal of MundoFox to the market and to address the weaknesses of transmitting in the low VHF band digitally.

Logo as MundoFox (2012–2015)

On January 28, 2013, America One/Asian American Network on 13.4 was replaced by WeatherNation TV.

On May 27, 2013, MegaTV was replaced by Soul of the South Network.

In January 2014, WeatherNation TV was replaced by Infomercials, then replaced by TheCoolTV a few months later.

On March 1, 2015, Soul of the South was replaced by Arirang after WOCK's owners filed a lawsuit for breach of contract due to non-payment of lease fees.

On March 1, 2015, TheCoolTV was replaced by Karmaloop TV. It was then replaced by FAD Channel in May 2015.

Some time in August 2015, the WPWR-DT3 simulcast of 13.1 was taken dark after ownership of MundoFox was transferred fully to RCN Televisión; the network was rebranded as MundoMax, and Fox had no further obligations to extend WOCK's signal.

In August 2016, 13.1 stopped airing MundoMax and began airing infomercials.

== Newscasts ==
WOCK-CD launched a 9 p.m. newscast, Hoy Noticias MundoFox 13 (later Hoy Noticias MundoMax) on April 18, 2014. The newscast was produced by the Chicago Tribune-owned Spanish-language newspaper Hoy.

== Subchannels ==
The station's digital signal is multiplexed:

Subchannels of WOCK-CD
Subchannel	Res.	Short name	Programming
13.1	1080i	ShopLC	Shop LC
13.2	480i	KBC	KBC-TV (KBS America)
13.3	1080i	ARIRANG	Arirang TV
13.4	480i	CGTN-N	CGTN
13.5	480i	CGTN-D	CGTN Documentary
