= VOZ (media company) =

American conservative Spanish-language news media firm

- Type: Spanish-language multimedia firm
- Industry: Media and Internet
- Founded: July 4, 2022; 4 years ago
- Founders: Orlando Salazar and Pablo Kleinman
- Headquarters: Las Colinas, Irving, Texas, US
- Owner: Voz Media Inc.
- Number of employees: ~30
- Website: voz.us

Voz is an American conservative Spanish language news media firm founded in 2022 by Orlando Salazar with Pablo Kleinman. Its headquarters are in Las Colinas, Irving, Texas.

== History ==
Orlando Salazar, who founded Voz in 2022 and is its CEO, is also a commercial real estate developer and beef company owner. He is a former vice chair of the Republican National Hispanic Assembly. He has described Voz Media's content as "right-of-center".

His co-founder, Pablo Kleinman, the company's former COO, was the host of a daily talk show on Univision Radio until early 2021. He previously founded several technology and media enterprises, and was a congressional candidate and member of the Executive Committee of the California Republican Party.

According to The Dallas Morning News, Voz aims to become a conservative rival to the dominant Spanish language channels Univision and Telemundo. Voz contributors include members of conservative Hispanic groups, former officials who served in Donald Trump's presidency, and members of the America First Policy Institute, a pro-Trump think tank.

In February 2023, Voz Media announced it would buy Mega TV, the Spanish Broadcasting System's (SBS) network television operation, for $64 million, but the deal fell through acrimoniously. A lawsuit by SBS against Voz, Salazar and his wife, Kleinman, and Ryan Morfin was settled in 2024 in what SBS described as a "multimillion-dollar agreement", though the exact amount was not disclosed.

As of 2023, Voz had offices and studios in the Dallas area, Miami, and Madrid.
