= Dominio Digital =

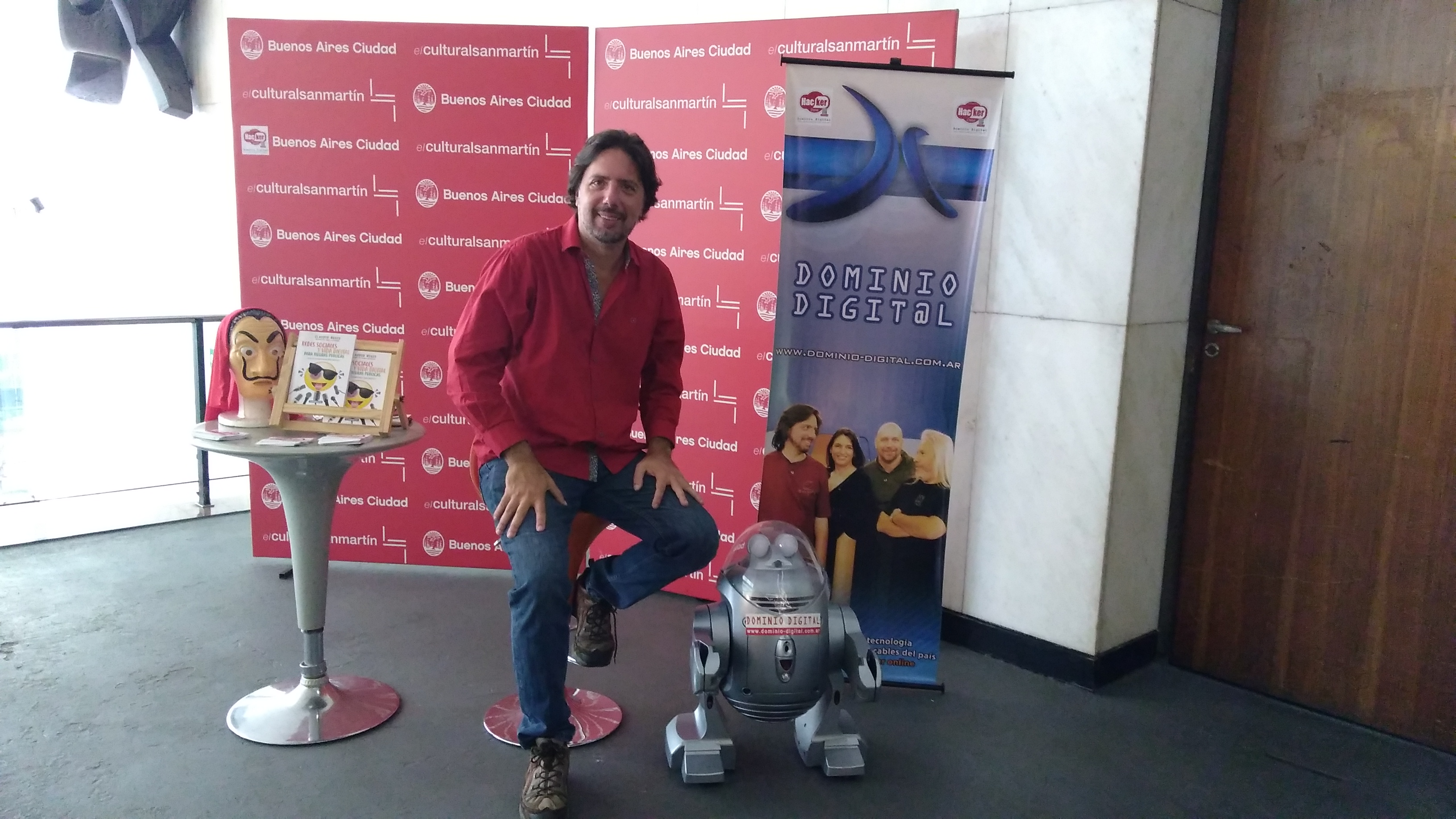
Claudio Regis at the Dominio Digital booth at FLISoL CABA 2018

Dominio Digital is a informatics program from Argentina.

Created in 1996, it was initially streamed on several television channels (Magazine, Metro, Menorah, Canal María, Canal Ideas, Canal Alternativa, etc.). In 2003, it was exclusively streamed on Televisión Pública. It is currently streamed on the internet.

The program is presented by Claudio Regis and originally featured the following columnists: Daniela Gastaminza, Daniel Cialdella, Alejandro Ponicke and Daniel Sentinelli. With time, other columnists have been invited to their staff, including Hernán Popper, Fernando Monticelli, Maximiliano Firtman, Gastón M. Ferreirós, Joel Chornik and Matias Giunta.

== Content ==
The program covered news about several subjects, including technology, privacy and security. The program debates about several current topics, including electronic voting.

Celebrating 15 years since the program first aired, a stratospheric capsule called "Clementina" was launched from San Luis. It reached the hight of 15 thousand feet.
