= WMAA-LP =

Low-power FM radio station in Moca, Puerto Rico

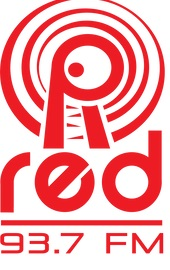
- Moca, Puerto Rico; Puerto Rico
- Frequency: 93.7 MHz
- Branding: Red 93.7

Programming
- Format: Contemporary Christian
- Affiliations: Red Informativa de PR

Ownership
- Owner: Behind the Sound Corp.
- Sister stations: WGDL

History
- First air date: February 1, 2016
- Call sign meaning: Moca; Aguada; Aguadilla

Technical information
- Licensing authority: FCC
- Facility ID: 193601
- Class: L1
- Power: 313 watts
- Transmitter coordinates: 18°14′08.00″N 66°2′12.0″W

Links
- Public license information: LMS
- Website: www.red93fm.com

WMAA-LP (93.7 FM, Red 93.7) is a radio station broadcasting a Contemporary Christian format. Licensed to Moca, Puerto Rico, the station serves the western Puerto Rico area. The station is currently owned by Behind The Sound Corporation, and features programming from Red Informativa de Puerto Rico.
