= América CV Network =

American Spanish-language TV network

América CV
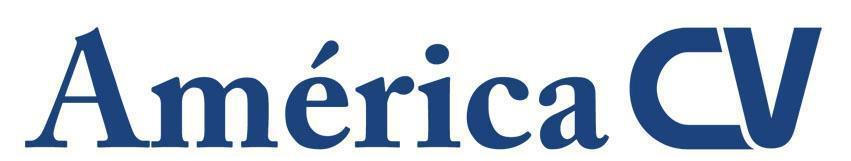
- Type: Spanish broadcast television network
- Country: United States
- Availability: Puerto Rico, Miami and New York City
- Founded: 2007; 19 years ago by Omar Romay; Alejandro Burillo Azcárraga; Carlos Barba
- Owner: Sherjan Broadcasting & Caribevision Holdings (through Barba TV Group & Pegaso Television)
- Parent: América CV Network, LLC
- Key people: Pedro Roig (court-appointed receiver) (Chief Executive Officer); Omar Romay (Head of Programming & Production)
- Dissolved: 2015; 11 years ago
- Former names: CaribeVisión; CV Network
- Official website: www.americacv.com
- Replaced by: América TeVé

América CV was a Spanish television network in the United States, created as a result of the joint venture agreement between Sherjan Broadcasting (owner of América Teve) and Caribevision Holdings (owned by Barba TV Group & Pegaso Television) (owner of CaribeVisiòn). The network's name was a combination of the names of the two companies' broadcasting outlets, América TeVe and CV Network.

== History ==
CaribeVisiòn launched in 2007 with owned-and-operated stations in New York City, Chicago, Miami, and San Juan until November 2009. Eventually being re-branded to CV Network, the network and its related owned-and-operated stations, as well as Sherjan's América TeVe, were brought under the common ownership and management of a new entity, América-CV Network, LLC, and its sister company, América-CV Station Group, Inc.. Sherjan Broadcasting & Caribevision Holdings added their additional programming content to the network's existing programming over time. On July 31, 2012, the four stations contributed by Caribevision Holdings to the joint venture took affiliation with MundoFox, which soft-launched the day after, with the official launch coming August 13. The fifth station, Miami's Channel 41, remained independent. In January 2013, WFUN (also Miami), left the Mundo Fox affiliation, and launched Teveo, a news channel directed at the Spanish-speaking community in Miami. In the late summer of 2016, WPXO abruptly disaffiliated from MundoMax; the network would cease operations in December of that year.

== Former affiliates ==
- WNYX-LD 34.1 New York
- WFUN-LD 41.1 Miami, FL
- WJPX 24.1 San Juan, PR
- WOCK-CD 13.1 Chicago, IL
