= Baron Maurice de Hirsch's Agricultural Settlements in Argentina =

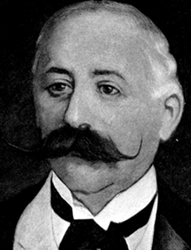
Baron Maurice de Hirsch

Various agricultural settlements in Argentina housed Eastern European (especially Russian) Jews fleeing persecution in hopes of establishing a new life in the wake of the Kiev Pogroms. German Jewish philanthropist Baron Maurice de Hirsch created the settlements to build a future for Eastern European Jewry around the world. After seeing an increase in antisemitism, Hirsch hoped to bring targeted Jews a more substantial solution than charity. As a result, Hirsch created the Jewish Colonisation Association to pursue this goal and used all his fortune to establish colonies in Argentina. Colonies included Mauricio, Moisesville, Villa Clara, San Antonio. Common struggles included finding funding and arable land, as well as leadership issues. Today, as a result, many of the colonies have lost their Jewish culture.

== Background ==
The Argentine Republic, the official name for the country known today as Argentina, was home to multiple agricultural colonies of Jews set up by Maurice de Hirsch, a wealthy philanthropist who became familiar with the struggles of Jews in the empire during his creation of the Oriental Railway, which led him to the Ottoman Empire. Here he compared the experiences of Russian and Ottoman Jews, and upon realizing that the conditions of Russian Jews were even worse than that of those in the Ottoman Empire, he attempted to use his fortune to provide these Jews with an education. Denied by the Russian government, he believed that the only option left was emigration, and established the Jewish Colonization Association in 1891. Upon its formation, the association had a goal:

"To assist and promote the emigration of Jews from any part of Europe or Asia and principally from countries in which they may for the time being be subjected to any special taxes or political or other disabilities to any other part of the world and to form and establish colonies in various parts of North and South America and other countries for agricultural, commercial, and other purposes."

— Ernst Schwarz and Johan C. Te Velde, "Jewish Agricultural Settlement in Argentina: The ICA Experiment".

In the 18th-century, farmers were viewed as prime citizens, and Hirsch wanted to open this status towards the Jews, who had not found success in agriculture across Europe. This idea was called "productivization", and for Jews specifically, it included the idea that being involved in manual labor would banish antisemitism from the world and put them on an even playing field with other groups. Prior to colonization, Argentina had a minimal population, and in 1890 the decline of the economic system provided favorable conditions to buy land. In 1891, Hirsch purchased the first sections of land for the ICA, and by 1939, the company owned 1,519,000 acres in Argentina.

== Agricultural colonies in the Argentine Empire ==
The country of Argentina

Hirsch spent nearly his entire fortune on establishing agricultural colonies in the Argentine Empire, which upon his death in 1896, saw 6,757 colonists across multiple Argentinian Settlements.

=== Moisesville ===
Moisesville was founded in 1890, even before the JCA, which allowed it to become the most successful colony. The colony was first founded by Russian Jewish immigrants fleeing persecution who bought land by themselves. The colony focused on cattle, and uniquely, the colony provided goods for sale, like butter, cheese, and milk, which brought other colonists and created a source of income. The colony boasted public services like schools, synagogues, libraries, theatre, and newspapers.

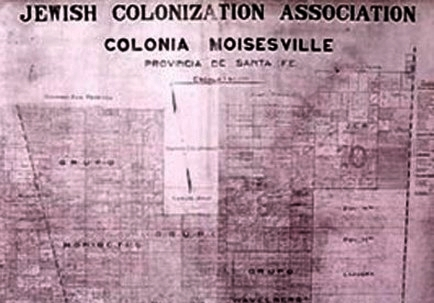
Map of the plots of Colonia Moisesville (Argentina)

=== Mauricio ===
The larger of the two named colonies, Mauricio, was in the modern Buenos Aires Province. Along with specializing in cattle, on the 62,000 acres (25,000 ha), colonists and settlers grew alfalfa, wheat, and maize.

=== Villa Clara ===
A sub-colony of Mauricio, Villa Clara, named after Hirsch's wife, contained 19 villages that worked to cultivate 66,656 acres (26,975 ha) of land. Founded in 1894, forty families from Russia arrived in a colony where everything essential to survival was already provided for them. They produced crops including wheat, flax, rye, and oats, as well as operating a cattle breeding farm. Despite areas with poor drainage, Villa Clara was thought to have topography that would be most conducive to agriculture

=== San Antonio ===
Founded in 1893, this small colony of only 56 families upon its founding included social amenities like a synagogue, school, hospital and more. Additionally, the colony grew fruit, and worked in meat production, from cows as well as poultry.

=== Other colonies ===
Other colonies that do not have much scholarship are Lucienville or Basavilbaso (Founded in 1895), Santa Isabel (1908), and Avigdor (1936).

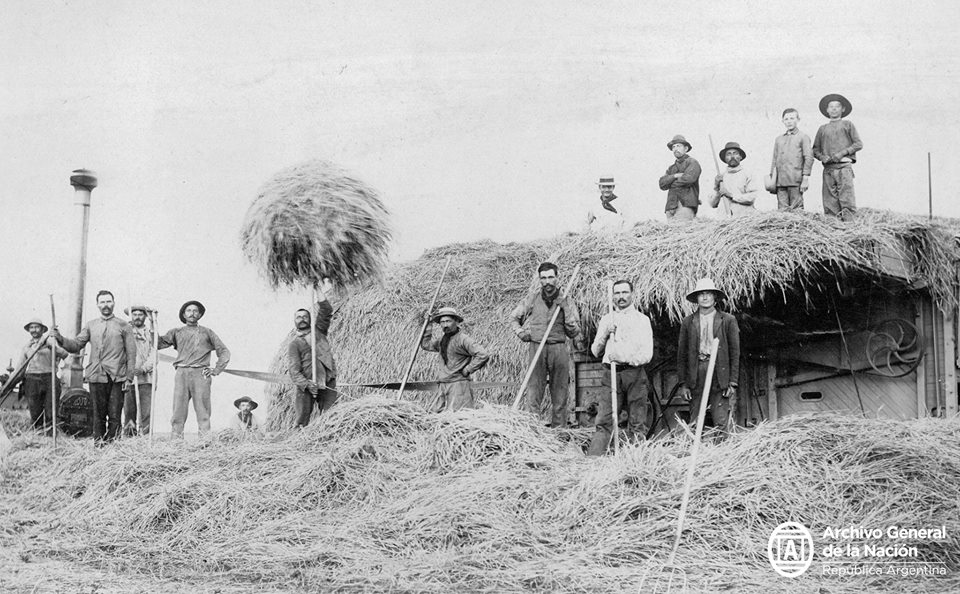
Jewish Settlers of an Argentina Agricultural Colony

=== Challenges within the settlements and their fate ===
In both the original and subsequent colonies, there were a slew of issues experienced by the colonists.

Most pressing was the issue of money, as the startup of the colonies proved to be extremely expensive. There was an attempt at distributing money monthly in hopes of creating more balanced demand, but this quickly failed.

Additionally, the agricultural practices proved problematic in the colonies, as most land was in the hands of the rich, making it difficult for the Jews to find arable land. Because of this, and the fact that there was no soil rotation taking place, the crops could not handle the unpredictable weather patterns of the area, causing agriculture to become a very unstable profession. Additionally, the Jews were forced to plant only one crop despite the low resilience of mono-cropping, as when these crops did succeed, it was the only way the farmers could pay the owners of the land.

The JCA held headquarters in Paris, with the nearest other office being in Buenos Aires, which is about 200 miles (320 km) away. Due to the closest JCA officials being in Buenos Aires, the first settlers were effectively alone in their colonies which they had to establish from the ground up, creating frustration amongst them and unhappiness towards the association, which was addressed later by the organization.

In 2001, Villa Clara saw 2,478 townspeople, and many of the once colonies are well known for their Jewish histories and integrated into historical tourism efforts of the area. The town struggles with income inequality and unemployment, but has become racially, ethnically, and religiously diverse. Jewish populations have decreased across Argentina, but those who remain work hard to keep the memory of the culture alive, through teaching Hebrew, as well as creating museums and cultural centers.

Today, the Jewish Colonization Association exists under the name "The Jewish Charitable Association" and works within Israel to support education, agriculture, and tourism.
