= WIBS =

Radio station in Guayama, Puerto Rico

Guayama, Puerto Rico; Puerto Rico
- Broadcast area: Puerto Rico area
- Frequency: 1540 kHz
- Branding: Caribe 1540 AM / 106.5 FM

Programming
- Format: Spanish Variety

Ownership
- Owner: AiLive Network; (International Broadcasting Corporation)
- Sister stations: WSJU-LD, WQBS, WRSJ, WQBS-FM, WIOA, WIOC, WZET, WGIT

History
- First air date: February 23, 1981
- Former call signs: WBJA (1981-1989)
- Call sign meaning: WIgberto Baez Santiago

Technical information
- Licensing authority: FCC
- Facility ID: 72384
- Class: D
- Power: 1,000 watts daytime only
- Transmitter coordinates: 17°59′44.00″N 66°4′39.00″W
- Translator: 106.5 W293DE (Guayama)

Links
- Public license information: Public file; LMS

WIBS (1540 AM, Radio Caribe) is a radio station broadcasting a Spanish Variety format. Licensed to Guayama, Puerto Rico, the station serves the Puerto Rico area. The station is owned by International Broadcasting Corporation. The station is shared with translator station W293DE 106.5 FM also located in Guayama.

== History ==
The station was assigned the call letters WBJA on February 23, 1981. On October 5, 1989, the station changed its call sign to WIBS.

== Translator stations ==
Broadcast translator for WIBS
| Call sign | Frequency | City of license | FID | ERP (W) | FCC info |
|---|---|---|---|---|---|
| W293DE | 106.5 FM | Guayama, Puerto Rico | 200724 | .25 | LMS |
