= WGIT =

Canóvanas, Puerto Rico; Puerto Rico
- Frequency: 1660 kHz
- Branding: Lighthouse 360

Programming
- Format: Spanish Religious

Ownership
- Owner: IBC-AERCO; (International Broadcasting Corporation)
- Operator: Faro de Santidad, Inc. (under time brokerage agreement)
- Sister stations: WSJU-LD, WQBS, WQBS-FM, WIOA, WIOC, WZET, WRSJ, WIBS

History
- First air date: July 27, 2001; 24 years ago
- Call sign meaning: GIganTe

Technical information
- Licensing authority: FCC
- Facility ID: 87150
- Class: B
- Power: 10,000 watts
- Transmitter coordinates: 18°23′59″N 65°55′16″W
- Translator: 101.1 W266CF (San Juan)

Links
- Public license information: Public file; LMS
- Website: www.farodesantidad.com

WGIT (1660 AM, Lighthouse 360) is a radio station broadcasting a Spanish Religious format. It is licensed to Canóvanas, Puerto Rico, and is owned by International Broadcasting Corporation. It is operated through a Local marketing agreement by Faro de Santidad, Inc. from Vega Baja, Puerto Rico. The station is shared with translator station W266CF 101.1 FM in San Juan, which is owned by Aurio A. Matos Barreto.

== History ==
WGIT originated as the expanded band "twin" of an existing station on the standard AM band. On March 17, 1997 the Federal Communications Commission (FCC) announced that 88 stations had been given permission to move to newly available "Expanded Band" transmitting frequencies, ranging from 1610 to 1700 kHz, with WCHQ in Camuy authorized to move from 1360 to 1660 kHz. The construction permit for the expanded band station on 1660 AM was assigned the callsign WGIT on December 14, 2000. WGIT later moved to Canóvanas and the station signed on the air on July 27, 2001.

An FCC policy for expanded band authorizations was that both the original station and its expanded band counterpart could operate simultaneously for up to five years, after which owners would have to turn in one of the two licenses, depending on whether they preferred the new assignment or elected to remain on the original frequency. On December 24, 2003, after 33 years on the air, WCHQ on 1360 AM went silent and shut down; on April 5, 2004 its license was cancelled and the call sign deleted from its database by the FCC.

== Translator stations ==
Broadcast translator for WGIT
Call sign	Frequency	City of license	FID	ERP (W)	FCC info
W266CF	101.1 FM	San Juan, Puerto Rico	143549	250 vertical	LMS
