= Noticias MundoFox =

- Created by: MundoFox
- Developed by: Jorge Mettey, SVP of News
- Presented by: Rolando Nichols
- Country of origin: United States
- Original language: Spanish

Production
- Executive producer: Luis Arturo Hernández
- Producers: Steve Malavé (East Coast); Sandra de Haro (West Coast)
- Production location: Los Angeles, California
- Running time: 30 minutes (Live 5:30 p.m. ET/PT); 30 minutes (Live 10:30 p.m. ET/PT); 30 minutes (MundoFox Y Ya!)

Original release
- Network: MundoFox
- Release: August 13, 2012 – July 27, 2015

Related
- MundoFox ¡Y Ya!

Noticias MundoFox was the national news division of the Spanish-language network, MundoFox, that was previously co-owned by the Fox Networks Group division of 21st Century Fox and RCN Television. The weeknightly news broadcast of the same name was hosted by Rolando Nichols with correspondents Carolina Sarassa and Max Aub. Following RCN acquiring Fox's share of MundoFox, the channel itself was renamed MundoMax and the newscast was cancelled on July 28, 2015 following the final broadcast the day prior (July 27).

RCN Television's NTN24 was the primary content provider for Noticias MundoFox, which had access to the bureaus of NTN24 and have its talent will appear on the newscast.

== Background ==
Noticias MundoFox has a newsroom based in Los Angeles, California (making it the only major U.S.-based network news division that is not headquartered in the Eastern United States) with bureaus in Mexico City, Washington, D.C., Chicago and New York City; airing on weekdays, four live half-hour editions of its main newscast are broadcast for the Eastern and Central Time Zones at 5:30 p.m. ET (2:30 p.m. PT) and for the Mountain and Pacific Time Zones at 5:30 p.m. PT (8:30 p.m. ET), as well as a live program MundoFox ¡Y Ya! for both coasts, which airs live at 5 and 10 p.m.

Noticias MundoFox's official tagline, which is used in the introduction, is "El Primer noticiero en la tarde y el unico producido en vivo para ambas costas", when translated means, "The only (national) newscast in the early evening and the only newscast produced live for both the East and West coasts". The tagline is in reference to MundoFox being the only network to air its national newscasts an hour earlier than its English and Spanish competitors, which airs their newscasts at 6:30 p.m. and airs a pre-recorded edition for the West coast.

Jorge Mettey, SVP of News for MundoFox was quoted as saying, “We are targeting Latinos, especially young Latinos who probably feel more comfortable speaking in English, but they do understand Spanish, and obviously we are also targeting Latinos who speak only Spanish... We are not focusing on the regular normal issues that newscasts in Spanish focus on, like immigration and that stuff. It is not our focus. We are talking to a different Latino. We are not talking to victims. We are talking to successful people eager to improve their lives.”

48 stations from MundoFox's initial 50-station affiliate body have also committed to developing in-house news departments to provide locally produced Spanish language newscasts to the markets served by the stations, a small number of whom do not have a Spanish language news option on local television (excluding KWHY-TV and WGEN-TV who already operate their own news departments). Affiliates without full-fledged newscasts are expected to produce two-minute local news capsules that will be aired during the network’s Noticias MundoFox national evening newscasts.

On July 16, 2015 21st Century Fox announced that it had sold its stake in MundoFox to RCN, giving the firm full ownership. Fox International Channels president Herman Lopez stated that the company was "proud of having started MundoFox with RCN and are confident that they will realize all of the potential of the network." That following July 28, "Noticias MundoFox" was cancelled and the entire staff was laid-off.

Fox would re-enter the Spanish language TV news market in October 2024, when it began airing Fox Noticias—which, unlike Noticias MundoFox, is produced by Fox News—for one hour each weekday on the Fox Deportes sports cable channel.

== Features ==
- During the newscasts, when a story is talked about, both the website and the lower-thirds uses hashtags to create discussions through social media.
- During the 5:30 p.m. edition of Noticias MundoFox, daily sports news is presented by the presenters of Central Fox, the nightly sports news program from sister network Fox Deportes. A daily segment on learning proper usage of the Spanish language, "Se Habla Espanol" is also featured, presented by North American Academy of the Spanish Language (ANLE) director Dr. Gerardo Piña-Rosales, Secretary Dr. Jorge I. Covarrubias and member Dr. Domnita Dumitrescu.
- In every newscast before the final story of the evening, Noticias MundoFox looks into stories that are happening in Latin America and the world featuring NTN24 reporters as well as a clip from NTN24's Club de Prensa, presented by Juan Carlos Iragorri, is shown discussing the day's stories featuring a MundoFox-exclusive introduction from Iragorri.

== Notable editions ==
- August 13, 2012: Inaugural edition
- September 15, 2012: Noticias MundoFox's first special, "Unidos por un Grito", which was co-hosted by Nichols and former Mexican president Vicente Fox to honor Mexican independence day.
- October 3, 16, and 22, 2012: Following the presidential debates between Barack Obama and Mitt Romney, MundoFox broke into regular programming and offered summaries of the debates with subtitles on-screen whenever Romney and Obama appeared. The Election 2012 coverage was known as "Noticias MundoFox: Comprometido Como Tú". This ultimately led to the creation of the standalone 10 p.m. edition of Noticias MundoFox.
- November 6, 2012: Noticias MundoFox, as part of its "Comprometido Como Tú" Election 2012 coverage, provided multi-platform coverage through its newscasts as well as with news updates and live streams on its website.
- November 22, 2012: Max Aub, who was substituting for Rolando Nichols, announced at the start of the East Coast edition of the newscast that Noticias MundoFox has hit 100th broadcast. The West Coast edition was the 101st broadcast.
- November 30 to December 1, 2012: Noticias MundoFox's "Mexico 12-18" special covering the inauguration of Mexican president Enrique Peña Nieto, which featured Nichols in Mexico co-hosting with a debuting Rick Sanchez as MundoFox contributor and introducing Peggy Carranza as Noticias MundoFox's New York correspondent.
- January 1, 2013: The first edition of Noticias MundoFox of the 2013 calendar year, hosted by Carolina Sarassa. Sarassa, who presented from the newsroom, on the East Coast edition welcomed viewers watching in Miami via WGEN-TV (channel 8), which became the newest MundoFox affiliate in the Miami market in an affiliation switch from the previously announced WJAN-CD.
- March 18, 2013, MundoFox debuted "MundoFOX ¡Y Ya!" which airs at 5 and 10 p.m. ET, and moved the 6 and 10 p.m. editions of "Noticias MundoFox" to 5:30 and 10:30 p.m. ET. Both programs will continue to televised live for both the East and West Coasts.
- June 3, 2013, Noticias MundoFox welcomed Melissa del Pozo as Noticias MundoFox's Mexico correspondent. In addition, beginning from the June 3rd broadcast, Noticias MundoFox's 5:30 East Coast edition aired on tape-delay in New York City on WNYE-TV, officially competing with WXTV and WNJU's 6 p.m. newscasts. The newscast was later dropped.
- February 24–28, 2014, "Noticias MundoFox" was broadcasting from Las Vegas, Nevada to celebrate MundoFox affiliate KMCC launching a news department. Nichols would also introduce KMCC anchor Ricardo Fernandez.
- July 27, 2015, "Noticias MundoFox" aired the final newscast. The following day, the newscast was cancelled and the entire news department was laid off. The "Noticias MundoFox" website was also taken down.
