= WQBS (AM) =

Radio station in San Juan, Puerto Rico

- San Juan, Puerto Rico; Puerto Rico
- Broadcast area: Puerto Rico
- Frequency: 870 kHz
- Branding: QBS 870 AM

Programming
- Format: Talk/Personality/Salsa
- Affiliations: Camarero Radio Network

Ownership
- Owner: IBC-AERCO (sale to SMD Media Group pending); (Aerco Broadcasting Corporation)
- Sister stations: WSJU-LD, WRSJ, WIOA, WIOC, WZET, WIBS, WGIT, WQBS-FM

History
- First air date: November 1, 1954; 71 years ago
- Former call signs: WHOA (1954–1980); WVOZ (1980–1992)
- Call sign meaning: Quality Broadcasting corporation of San Juan (former owners)

Technical information
- Licensing authority: FCC
- Facility ID: 573
- Class: B
- Power: 15,000 watts
- Transmitter coordinates: 18°21′58″N 66°12′56″W
- Repeater: 92.1 WZET-HD3 (Hormigueros)

Links
- Public license information: Public file; LMS
- Website: qbs870.com

WQBS (870 kHz), branded on-air as QBS 870 AM, is an AM radio station broadcasting a Talk/Personality/Salsa format. Licensed to San Juan, Puerto Rico, it serves the Puerto Rico area. The station is currently owned by Aerco Broadcasting Corporation.

WQBS's audio signal was broadcast on WSJU-TV channel 31.4 in San Juan, branded as WQBS TV. WQBS TV is the first over-the-air television channel that broadcasts programming from a radio station. WQBS Radio & WQBS TV broadcasts from studios in the IBC-AERCO Building in Rio Piedras. The channel ceased operations on September 5, 2018.

On June 20, 2024, Aerco Broadcasting Corporation announced a sale of WQBS to SMD Media Group, a new conglomerate that unite three radio networks converting into a multimedia content hub across the globe.
