= WRSJ =

San Juan, Puerto Rico; Puerto Rico
- Broadcast area: Puerto Rico
- Frequency: 1520 kHz
- Branding: Tiva Radio

Programming
- Format: Talk radio

Ownership
- Owner: IBC-AERCO; (International Broadcasting Corporation)
- Sister stations: WQBS, WQBS-FM, WSJU-LD, WGIT, WIBS, WIOA/WIOC, WZET

History
- First air date: August 8, 1950; 75 years ago
- Former call signs: WWWW (1950–1963); WRAI (1963–1996); WVOZ (1996–2016); WBYM (2016)
- Call sign meaning: Radio San Juan

Technical information
- Licensing authority: FCC
- Facility ID: 54958
- Class: B
- Power: 25,000 watts
- Transmitter coordinates: 18°21′11″N 66°12′9″W

Links
- Public license information: Public file; LMS
- Website: tivatv.com

WRSJ (1520 AM), branded on-air as Tiva Radio, is a radio station broadcasting a Talk radio format. Licensed to San Juan, Puerto Rico, it serves the Puerto Rico area. The station is owned by International Broadcasting Corporation.

On September 20, 2017, the station's transmitter site was heavily damaged by Hurricane Maria. One year later, The station returned to the air on December 11, 2018 as a simulcast of WQBS and the transmitter repairs are completed. On December 30, 2018 WRSJ rebrands as Activa 1520 AM and switched to a Spanish Tropical format. On May 11, 2020, the station switched to an Album Oriented Rock format and the current programming remains unchanged. On September 29, 2022, WRSJ switched to an Adult Contemporary format, rebranding itself as Romance 1520. Romance is still available on WZET 92.1 FM HD3 in the western region.
