= WZET =

Radio station licensed to Hormigueros, Puerto Rico

- Hormigueros, Puerto Rico; Puerto Rico
- Broadcast area: Puerto Rico
- Frequency: 92.1 MHz (HD Radio)
- Branding: Mix 107

Programming
- Format: Reggaeton/Urban AC
- Subchannels: HD1: WZET analog HD2: WIOA simulcast (Top 40/CHR); HD3: WQBS simulcast (Talk/Personality/Salsa); HD4: WGDL simulcast (Spanish Variety)

Ownership
- Owner: IBC-AERCO (sale to SMD Media Group pending); (International Broadcasting Corporation)
- Sister stations: WSJU-LD, WQBS, WIOA, WIOC, WIBS, WRSJ, WQBS-FM, WGIT

History
- First air date: 1980; 46 years ago
- Former call signs: WGIT (1980–1987); WBOZ-FM (1987–1991); WEGM (1991–2001); WSMA (2001–2002)
- Call sign meaning: Zeta

Technical information
- Licensing authority: FCC
- Facility ID: 61579
- Class: A
- ERP: 12,950 watts
- HAAT: 837.0 meters (2,746.1 ft)
- Transmitter coordinates: 18°19′13.2″N 67°10′43.3″W
- Translator: 106.9 W295BU (Mayagüez, relays HD2)

Links
- Public license information: Public file; LMS
- Website: www.mix107pr.com www.fresh999.com (HD2) www.qbs870.com (HD3) www.radiogrito.com (HD4)

WZET (92.1 FM), branded on-air as Mix 107, is a radio station licensed to Hormigueros, Puerto Rico, the station serves the Western Puerto Rico area. The station is currently owned by International Broadcasting Corporation.

WZET broadcasts in the HD Radio format, and carries additional programming on three of the station's HD subchannels. In addition, WZET-HD2's programming is simulcast on translator station W295BU 106.9 FM in Mayagüez. Fresh 99.9 FM, QBS 870 AM, and Radio Grito are simulcast on these stations through HD radio, too.

On June 20, 2024, International Broadcasting Corporation announced a sale of WZET/W295BU and other stations to SMD Media Group, a new conglomerate that unite three radio networks converting into a multimedia content hub across the globe.
