= Mega TV (American TV network) =

American television network

- logo for Mega TV
- Type: Television network
- Country: United States; Puerto Rico
- Broadcast area: National (selected markets)
- Headquarters: Miami, Florida

Programming
- Picture format: 1080i (HDTV); 480i (SDTV)

Ownership
- Owner: Spanish Broadcasting System

History
- Founded: March 1, 2006; 20 years ago
- Launched: March 1, 2006

Links
- Website: mega.tv (in Spanish)

Mega TV is an American free-to-air television network based in San Juan, Puerto Rico, that is owned by Spanish Broadcasting System (SBS). It was launched in 2006. The network's flagship is WSBS-TV, a television station licensed to Key West, Florida, with studios also in Miami.

In 2023, SBS said it would sell Mega TV to Voz Media, a conservative Spanish-language news media firm, but the deal fell through due to Voz Media CEO Orlando Salazar’s inability to come up with the funds he had committed to, to close the operation. SBS canceled the purchase agreement and said it would seek another buyer. Orlando Salazar and “his billionaire wife” ended up paying SBS a multi-million dollar fine for Mr. Salazar’s nonperformance.

== History ==
Mega TV was launched on March 1, 2006. Its original slate of programming includes productions aimed to young Hispanic viewers.

In early 2007, the station cut 55 employees to save production costs. A vast majority of locally produced programs such as Desvelados, Xpediente, El Noticero, El Vacilon, Entre Fichas, and Mega Especiales, Puerta Astral ("Star Port") and Agenda del Inmigrante were supposedly placed on hiatus. The channel is scheduled for a summer run with changes in hosts and renamed Codigo Astral ("Star Code").

SBS has entered into agreements with other television stations to air Mega TV programming, including: WBWP-LD in West Palm Beach, Florida; WHDO-CD in Orlando, Florida; WFHD-LD in Tampa, Florida; WHDC-LD in Mount Pleasant, South Carolina; KODF-LD in Dallas, Texas; WOCK-CD in Chicago, Illinois; KLPS-LP in Palm Springs, California; KMCC in Laughlin, Nevada; WMEI in Arecibo, Puerto Rico; and KSDI-LD in Fresno, California. WHDO, WFHD, WHDC, KLPS, and KSDI show Mega TV on digital subchannels. As of May 27, 2013, WOCK-CD in Chicago no longer carries Mega TV.

In February 2023, SBS said it would sell Mega TV to Voz Media, a conservative Spanish-language news media firm based in the Dallas area, but the deal fell through by that September. SBS said it would look for another buyer.

In April 2026, SBS filed for prepackaged Chapter 11 bankruptcy protection as part of a restructuring deal with creditors to significantly reduce debt, lowering interest expense, extending the company's maturity notes until 2030, and supported funds via accounts managed by Brigade Capital, Man Group and Bayside Capital.

== Programming ==
As of September 2021, Mega TV's original programming included:

- Bayly
- Antena Live
- Agenda del Inmigrante
- Dante Night Show
- En Corte con Ricardo Corona
- Ahora con Oscar Haza
- El Arañazo
- MegaNoticiero
- La Corte del Pueblo
- Cuéntame (2020) con Johnny Lozada y Ambar
- Mega Cine Cubano
- A Tacón Quita'o
- Vamonos de Viaje
- Cayo Hueso al Dia
- Mega Kids (E/I programming)
- TV Martí
- 22 Minutos
- Conectao's por la Cocina
- Ceriani
- Lo Mejor de La Radio en Mega TV
- Puerta Astral/Código Astral
- On The Street with Dariel Fernández
- Latin Angels
- Handyman
- Xpediente
- Show Business Extra
- ESPN Deportes en Mega TV
- El Circo de PR
- El Vacilón de NY
- Mundo Loco
- Testigo Directo
- Te Para Tres
- Codigo Secreto
- Esta es tu Casa con Natalia Cruz
- Mega News
- Corazones Guerreros con Natalia Denegri

== Current affiliates ==
- WSBS-TV Channel 22 Key West, Florida (Mega TV O&O/flagship station)

== Former affiliates ==
- KMCC Channel 34 Laughlin, Nevada (Now an Ion Affiliate)
- KLPS-LP channel 19 Indio, California (Now Defunct)
- KTBU Channel 55 Conroe, Texas (Now a Quest owned-and-operated (O&O) sold to Tegna Inc.)
- WOCK-CD Channel 13 Chicago, Illinois (Now an Independent station)
- WBWP-LD Channel 57 West Palm Beach, Florida (Now an Independent station)
- KODF-LD Channel 27 Dallas, Texas (Now Silent)
- KUVM-LD Channel 10.5 Houston, Texas (now Wizebuy TV)
- WHDO-CD Channel 38.2 Orlando, Florida (Now BizTV)
- WFTV Channel 9.2 Orlando, Florida (Now Laff)
- W21AU-D Channel 21.1 Orlando, Florida (now Nuestra Visión)
- WACX Channel 55.11 Orlando, Florida (Subchannel now an Aliento Vision affiliate)
- WATV-LD Channel 47 Orlando, Florida (Now an Azteca América affiliate)
- WSJU-TV Channel 31 San Juan, Puerto Rico (Now Defunct)
- WMEI Channel 14 Arecibo, Puerto Rico (Now Defunct)
- WOST Channel 22 Mayagüez, Puerto Rico (Now an Azteca América affiliate)
- WTCV Channel 18 San Juan, Puerto Rico (Now a Daystar affiliate)
  - WVEO Channel 18 Aguadilla, Puerto Rico (satellite of WTCV)
  - WVOZ-TV Channel 18 Ponce, Puerto Rico (satellite of WTCV)
- WHDC-LD Channel 12.2 Charleston, South Carolina (Subchannel now a Court TV affiliate)
- WTAM-LD Channel 30 Tampa, Florida (Now an Azteca América affiliate)
- WGCT-LD Channel 19.4 Tampa, Florida (now Ace TV)
