= WJAN-CD =

Television station in Miami

WJAN-CD and WFUN-LD

Miami, Florida; United States
- Channels for WJAN-CD: Digital: 33 (UHF); Virtual: 41
- Channels for WFUN-LD: Digital: 20 (UHF), shared with WLMF-LD; Virtual: 41
- Branding: América TeVé (general); América Noticias (newscasts)

Programming
- Affiliations: 41.1: América Tevé; 41.2: Teveo

Ownership
- Owner: América CV Network (Carlos Luis Vasallo Tomé); (América CV Station Group, Inc.)
- Sister stations: WLMF-LD

History
- Founded: WFUN-LD: 1989
- First air date: WJAN-CD: June 24, 1994; WFUN-LD: April 27, 1989
- Former call signs: WJAN-CD: W41BF (1994–1995); WJAN-LP (1995–2000); WJAN-CA (2000–2010); WFUN-LD: W27AQ (1989–1998); W48CI (1998–1999); WFUN-LP (1999–2002); WFUN-CA (2002–2009)
- Former channel number: WJAN-CD: Analog: 41 (UHF, 1995–2010); Digital: 41 (UHF, 2010–2018); WFUN-LD: Analog: 27 (UHF, 1989–1998), 48 (UHF, 1998–2009); Digital: 48 (UHF, 2009–2021)
- Former affiliations: WJAN-CD: MundoFox (2012–2013); WFUN-LD: CBS (via WCIX, 1989–1995); NBC (via WTVJ, 1995–1998); America-CV Network (2007–2012); MundoFox (2012–2013)
- Call sign meaning: WJAN-CD: Sherjan Broadcasting (former name at founding of América CV); WFUN-LD: Former call sign of WAXY (790 AM)

Technical information
- Licensing authority: FCC
- Facility ID: WJAN-CD: 60165; WFUN-LD: 60542
- Class: WJAN-CD: CD; WFUN-LD: LD
- ERP: 15 kW
- HAAT: WJAN-CD: 507.4 m (1,665 ft); WFUN-LD: 54.2 m (178 ft)
- Transmitter coordinates: WJAN-CD: 25°32′25.4″N 80°28′6.2″W; WFUN-LD: 25°59′9″N 80°11′37″W

Links
- Public license information: WJAN-CD: Public file; LMS; WFUN-LD: Public file; LMS
- Website: www.americateve.com

WJAN-CD (channel 41) is a low-power, class A Spanish-language independent station in Miami, Florida, United States. Owned by América CV Station Group, Inc., the station maintains studios on NW 107th Avenue in Hialeah Gardens, and its transmitter is located due south of Aladdin City.

WFUN-LD (channel 41), also licensed to Miami, serves as a translator of WJAN-CD; this station's transmitter is co-located with WJAN-CD's studios.

== History ==
=== WFUN-LD ===
The station's license application was first submitted to the Federal Communications Commission (FCC) in 1980, but a construction permit was not issued until 1988, with a license issued the following year as W27AQ. Owned by Skinner Broadcasting, channel 27 was intended to be a low-power independent TV station branded as "WFUN-TV" and aimed at Broward County. The station, approved to place its transmitter atop the Pompano Beach Club, would have aired sports, financial and other programming.

When W27AQ signed on April 27, however, it did not air its own programming. Instead, it was leased to new CBS affiliate WCIX to serve areas of Broward County that its Homestead-based analog signal could not. In the immediate wake of Hurricane Andrew, which collapsed the Homestead tower, W27AQ remained on the air as WCIX's only broadcast signal. WCIX's translator network remained with the channel 6 facility after the 1995 swap between it and WTVJ.

In June 1998, the station ceased rebroadcasting WTVJ. It moved to UHF channel 48 and its call letters were changed to W48CI. In early 1999, its calls were changed to WFUN-LP; the station license was later upgraded to Class A status and its calls were altered to WFUN-CA in 2002, before reverting to LPTV status in 2004. In 2009, WFUN flash-cut its digital signal into operation on UHF channel 48.

=== WJAN-CD ===
WJAN-CD first signed on the air on June 24, 1994, as W41BF, originally broadcasting on UHF channel 41. That same year, it began broadcasting its first independently produced entertainment series produced for the U.S. Hispanic market, A Oscuras Pero Encendidos. Hosted by producer and entertainer Paul Bouche, the program became a success and in 2000, owner Omar Romay started investing in locally produced entertainment programs. In 1995, the station changed its call letters to WJAN-LP, and its license was upgraded to Class A status as WJAN-CA in 2000. By 2009, the station carried seven hours of original programming each day, and had a share of over 10% of the Spanish-language television audience in the Miami market during prime time hours.

=== Later years ===
WJAN became an affiliate of MundoFox at the network's launch on August 13, 2012, and began branding on-air as "MundoFox 41.1 & 48.2 Miami," in reference to its simulcast on WFUN-LD digital subchannel 48.2. At that time, the station's intellectual operations, known as "América TeVé" moved exclusively (with the exception of its 5 and 10 p.m. newscasts, which are simulcasted on the station), to WFUN-LD digital channel 48.1. On December 28, 2012, MundoFox announced that it would move its Miami affiliation from WJAN to Key West–based WGEN-TV (channel 8), with WJAN and WFUN reverting to independent status.

Due to the loss of the MundoFox affiliation, on January 28, 2013, WJAN-CD and WFUN-LD launched a new programming format called Teveo, which is stylized as a 24-hour news channel that airs each weekday from 5 p.m. to midnight and weekends from 7 to 11 p.m. "Teveo" carries all of the station's live newscasts, along with rebroadcasts of its 6 and 11 p.m. newscasts and its public affairs programs including A Mano Limpia and Sevcec a Fondo. It also added live weekday hour-long 7 and 9 p.m. newscasts on that date, making it the only station in South Florida with newscasts in those timeslots (the 9 p.m. newscast was later canceled on April 12, 2013, to make way for a news/talk program that debuted the following Monday). On weekends, "Teveo" carries a "week-in-review" selection of its news programs. Paid programming is shown at other times of the day.

== Subchannels ==
The stations' signals are multiplexed:

=== WJAN-CD subchannels ===
Subchannels of WJAN-CD
| Subchannel | Res. | Short name | Programming |
|---|---|---|---|
| 41.1 | 720p | ATV-HD | América Tevé |
| 41.2 | 720p | TVEO-HD | Teveo |

=== WFUN-LD subchannels ===
Subchannels of WLMF-LD and WFUN-LD
| License | Subchannel | Res. | Short name | Programming |
|---|---|---|---|---|
| WLMF-LD | 41.3 | 480i | SHOP LC | Shop LC (4:3) |
| WFUN-LD | 41.1 | 720p | ACV-HD | América Tevé |
| WFUN-LD | 41.2 | 720p | TVO-HD | Teveo |
