= WIOA =

Radio station in San Juan, Puerto Rico

- San Juan; Puerto Rico
- Broadcast area: Puerto Rico
- Frequency: 99.9 MHz
- Branding: Fresh 99.9 FM

Programming
- Languages: Spanish and English
- Format: Top 40/CHR

Ownership
- Owner: IBC-AERCO (sale to SMD Media Group pending); (International Broadcasting Corporation)
- Sister stations: WSJU-LD, WRSJ, WGIT, WIOC, WZET, WQBS, WQBS-FM, WIBS

History
- First air date: March 1, 1961
- Former call signs: WFQM (1961–1968); WKYN-FM (1968–1970); WQBS-FM (1970–1977); WIOB (1977–1985)

Technical information
- Licensing authority: FCC
- Facility ID: 8151
- Class: B
- ERP: 37,000 watts
- HAAT: 856.0 meters (2,808.4 ft)
- Transmitter coordinates: 18°16′31″N 66°35′34.8″W

Links
- Public license information: Public file; LMS
- Webcast: Listen Live
- Website: maxima99.com

WIOA (99.9 FM), branded on-air as Fresh 99.9 FM, is a radio station broadcasting a bilingual Top 40/CHR format. Licensed to San Juan, Puerto Rico, it serves the Puerto Rico area. The station is currently owned by International Broadcasting Corporation.

WIOA is simulcast on WIOC 105.1 FM in southern Puerto Rico, including Ponce, and 106.9 FM for western Puerto Rico. On October 14, 2014, Estereotempo moved frequencies from 99.9 FM to 96.5 FM, while Fresh 99.9 FM began broadcasting on October 15, 2014, with better coverage in the metropolitan area. Fresh offered a wide variety of American CHR Music. On February 3, 2025, after ten years as Fresh, the station relaunched as Máxima 99.9 FM maintaining its Top 40/CHR format. Máxima broadcast on 99.9 FM Metro, 105.1 FM South & 92.1 FM West covering the entire market. On June 1, 2026, after one year relaunching Máxima, the station reverted the Fresh branding and keeps the Top 40/CHR format intact.

== WIOC ==
WIOC
- Ponce; Puerto Rico
- Broadcast area: Puerto Rico area
- Frequency: 105.1 MHz
- Branding: Fresh 99.9 FM

Programming
- Languages: Spanish and English
- Format: Top 40/CHR

Ownership
- Owner: IBC-AERCO (sale to SMD Media Group pending); (International Broadcasting Corporation)
- Sister stations: WSJU-LD, WIOA, WZET, WGIT, WIBS, WRSJ, WQBS, WQBS-FM

History
- First air date: 1965; 61 years ago
- Former call signs: WPRP-FM (1965–1977)

Technical information
- Licensing authority: FCC
- Facility ID: 8152
- Class: B
- ERP: 50,000 watts
- HAAT: 820.0 meters (2,690.3 ft)
- Transmitter coordinates: 17°59′53″N 66°38′12″W

Links
- Public license information: Public file; LMS
- Website: fresh999.com

WIOC (105.1 FM), also branded on-air as Fresh 99.9 FM, is a radio station broadcasting a bilingual Top 40/CHR format. Licensed to Ponce, Puerto Rico, the station serves the Puerto Rico area. The station is currently owned by International Broadcasting Corporation.

== History ==
WIOA signed on March 1, 1961 as WFQM. It was originally owned by the Supreme Broadcasting Company of Puerto Rico, controlled by Alfredo Ramírez de Arellano y Bártoli, and it was the FM counterpart to WKYN (630 AM), known as "La Gran Cadena FM" with a beautiful music format. In 1968, the call letters were changed to WKYN-FM, with the WQBS-FM designation adopted in 1970.

By that time the three radio stations that formed the network were WQBS-AM-FM 630 & 99.9 San Juan, WORA-AM-FM 760 and 97.5 Mayagüez, and WPRP-AM-FM 910 and 105.1 Ponce. The FM stations were intended to change their call signs on September 1, 1977, to WIOA, WIOB and WIOC, respectively, but confusion with WHOA (870 AM) in San Juan required the first two stations to change. After WHOA was sold to Pedro Román Collazo and became the current WQBS, WIOA and WIOB exchanged call letters in 1985.

In 1976, the station relaunched as Estereotempo, eventually segueing into a romantic/ballad format in the late 1980s.

Estereotempo moved to WRXD 96.5 FM in San Juan on October 14, 2014, making way for Fresh, a hot adult contemporary format; the Estereotempo format was dismantled in 2018, and WIOB is no longer co-owned. WIOC continues to rebroadcast WIOA. However, the Estereotempo name and its Spanish AC returned on 96.5 in San Juan in 2023.

Originally the antenna and transmitters were located on the roof of Ponce De León 23 story building, 1st Federal Savings. Now they are located on one of the highest peaks next to El Yunque providing much better coverage.

On June 20, 2024, International Broadcasting Corporation announced a sale of WIOA/WIOC and other stations to SMD Media Group, a new conglomerate that unite three radio networks converting into a multimedia content hub across the globe.
