= WQBS-FM =

Radio station in Carolina, Puerto Rico

Carolina, Puerto Rico; Puerto Rico
- Broadcast area: Puerto Rico
- Frequency: 107.7 MHz
- Branding: Mix 107

Programming
- Format: Reggaeton/Urban AC

Ownership
- Owner: IBC-AERCO (sale to SMD Media Group pending); (International Broadcasting Corporation)
- Sister stations: WSJU-LD, WQBS, WRSJ, WGIT, WIBS, WIOA/WIOC, WZET

History
- First air date: 1967; 59 years ago
- Former call signs: WVOZ-FM (1967–1969); WOLA-FM (1969–1983); WVOZ-FM (1983–1994); WAHQ (1994–1998); WVOZ-FM (1998–2016)

Technical information
- Licensing authority: FCC
- Facility ID: 28921
- Class: B
- ERP: 36,000 watts
- HAAT: 878.0 meters (2,880.6 ft)
- Transmitter coordinates: 18°16′31″N 66°55′34.8″W

Links
- Public license information: Public file; LMS
- Website: mix107pr.com

WQBS-FM (107.7 MHz), branded on-air as Mix 107, is a radio station broadcasting an Urban Adult Contemporary format. Licensed to Carolina, Puerto Rico, it serves the Puerto Rico area. The station is currently owned by International Broadcasting Corporation.

WQBS-FM is widely credited as having pioneered the Hurban (short for "Hispanic Urban") radio format. This format mixes English-language rap and R&B with Latin rap, Latin pop and reggaeton.

Personalities such as the announcer Luis J. Ortiz "El Coyote" are recognized for their great contribution to this platform since its inception, positioning urban music in Puerto Rico and countries where the signal of this radio arrived. In addition, recently recognized new communicators outside of radio have been added to renew the radio, one of them is Danya Santana, Maiky Backstage and Richie in the House.

On June 20, 2024, International Broadcasting Corporation announced a sale of WQBS-FM and other stations to SMD Media Group, a new conglomerate that unite three radio networks converting into a multimedia content hub across the globe.
