= MundoMax =

Former American Spanish-language TV network

- Type: Terrestrial television network
- Country: United States
- Broadcast area: Nationwide (via digital terrestrial television in many markets; national feed was available on TV providers elsewhere)
- Affiliates: List of affiliates
- Headquarters: Miami

Programming
- Language: Spanish
- Picture format: 720p (HDTV); 480i (SDTV) (formatted to downconverted widescreen in many markets)

Ownership
- Owner: RCN Televisión
- Key people: Jose Molina (president, MundoMax)

History
- Founded: January 23, 2012
- Launched: August 13, 2012
- Founder: Fox International Channels; RCN Televisión
- Closed: November 30, 2016 (4 years, 109 days)
- Former names: MundoFox (2012–2015)

MundoMax (Spanish pronunciation: [ˈmundomaks]; formerly MundoFox from August 13, 2012, to July 28, 2015) was an American Spanish-language terrestrial television network that was owned by RCN Televisión. The network broadcast programs aimed at Hispanic and Latino American audiences throughout the United States – featuring a mix of telenovelas and other serialized dramas, reality television series, game shows, and feature films (both Spanish-dubbed versions of American films and imported films produced in Spanish-speaking countries).

Headquartered in Los Angeles, MundoMax had been headed since its inception in its pre-July 2015 existence as a joint venture between RCN and U.S.-based Fox Entertainment Group (which originally operated the network through its Fox International Channels division) by network president Jose Molina.

== History ==
=== As MundoFox ===
Original logo as MundoFox, used from August 13, 2012 (or August 1 on some pending affiliates) to July 27, 2015; logo briefly remained in use as on-air bug and on official network social media pages after the rebranding to MundoMax.

MundoMax traces its origins to the announcement by Fox International Channels and RCN Televisión that the two companies would jointly launch a new Spanish language television network in the United States under the MundoFox brand on January 23, 2012. Hernán López, president and CEO of Fox International Channels, said that the network would cater to "an increasing demand for quality Spanish-language content in the U.S. from both viewers and advertisers." According to 2010 United States Census data, among the 309 million people living in the U.S., 50 million of them were of some form of Hispanic and Latino heritage (totaling 16% of the total population); advertising revenue from the Hispanic/Latino market made up $3.6 billion of the $80 billion (or 4.5% of all ad revenue) in the total domestic market in 2011. López noted that the Fox Broadcasting Company saw "similar dynamics in play" when News Corporation (the corporate parent of Fox International Channels at the time of the announcement) launched the network in October 1986 against established English language networks ABC, NBC and CBS; MundoFox, he added, would seek to replicate Fox's early years while launching against established Spanish language networks Univision, Telemundo, and TeleFutura.

MundoFox commenced programming with a soft launch on some of its charter affiliates on August 1, 2012; the network's formal launch occurred twelve days later on August 13. Until it rebranding as MundoMax, MundoFox was headquartered with 21st Century Fox's other U.S. television operations in Los Angeles, California.

Like Fox, MundoFox was named after the film studio that was originally called 20th Century Fox (the network's corporate sibling prior to that studio's acquisition by The Walt Disney Company) and (indirectly) after the producer William Fox, who had founded one of the film studio's predecessors, Fox Film, before it was merged with 20th Century Pictures in 1935.

=== Relaunch as MundoMax ===
On July 16, 2015, 21st Century Fox announced that it had sold its stake in MundoFox to RCN Televisión, giving the Colombian private broadcaster full ownership of the network. Fox International Channels president Herman Lopez stated that the company was "proud of having started MundoFox with RCN and are confident that they will realize all of the potential of the network."

On July 28, 2015, RCN announced that it would rebrand the network as MundoMax effective that day; the name change and new imaging package was fully implemented on-air two weeks later on August 13, coinciding with the third anniversary of the network's launch; however, the logo used by the network under the MundoFox identity remained in use as on-screen bug during programming and on the network's Facebook and Twitter accounts until the rebrand was completed. Additionally, RCN announced that it had shut down the network's news division, with company representatives arguing that news programming was "never part of the plan" for the network. The folding of the news division resulted in the layoff of 35 staff members as a result. On July 31, network president Ibra Morales stated regarding the move that "although we have cancelled Noticias MundoFox, RCN Television Group continues its dedication to bringing quality news coverage to the vibrant and dynamic U.S. Hispanic community".

=== Closure ===
On October 6, 2016, it was announced by RCN Television that MundoMax would end operations and all affiliation contracts on November 30, 2016, and lay off dozens of employees in several departments, including administration, programming, promotions, research and sales in Los Angeles, New York and Miami. It was further confirmed on November 10, 2016. The network cited low ratings (which had not been tabulated since Nielsen Media terminated their contract with the network at the end of September), along with an affiliate base which was unable to acquire cable carriage due to their mainly low-power Class A status where must-carry status was unable to be executed. Several affiliates switched to Estrella TV, with Azteca America and other Spanish-language networks also taking advantage. The network went off the air without any ceremony on the night of November 30 at 11:59 p.m.

== Programming ==
MundoMax operated on a 126-hour network programming schedule, which it adopted in January 2015. It provided general entertainment programming to owned-and-operated and affiliated stations Monday through Fridays from 8:30 a.m. to 1:00 a.m. and Saturdays and Sundays from 10:00 a.m. to 1:00 a.m. Eastern and Pacific Time. Children's programming blocks under the brands "MundoMax Kids" and "XtremaMax" – the former of which features programs compliant with FCC educational programming requirements – aired for three hours each Sunday starting at 9:00 a.m. Eastern and Pacific Time. All other time periods were filled with religious programming or infomercials.

MundoMax had production and distribution agreements with companies including network parent RCN, former co-parent Fox International Channels and 21st Century Fox-owned Shine Group (which produced the company's first Spanish-language programs for the network); RCN co-owned NTN24 and Fox Deportes originally supplied content for the network prior to the divestiture of Fox's interest. Prior to the launch of what began as MundoFox, Fox International Channels was already a major producer of Spanish-language programming and sports for its Latin American and U.S. Hispanic-oriented cable channels, with some of the international programs being distributed to the network for broadcast in the United States. RCN is one of the largest producers and exporters of Spanish-language television programming, and had previously provided content mainly to Univision sister network TeleFutura (now UniMás); it stopped committing productions to other Hispanic-targeted networks in the U.S. in anticipation of MundoFox's launch. Brazilian novelas such as José do Egito and Lado a Lado also aired as did a dubbed version of the Turkish series Muhteşem Yüzyıl under the title "Suleimán - El Gran Sultán."

A signature program format on MundoMax was the "teleseries", which produced fewer episodes compared to telenovelas traditionally seen on Spanish-language television (roughly 80 versus an average of 120), but emphasized action-oriented storylines, diverse locations and increased production values. One such teleseries that appeared on MundoFox at its launch was El Capo, a show produced for RCN by Fox Telecolombia. Once-a-week series are also featured – which air on weekend evenings – including fellow inaugural programs Kdabra and Tiempo Final ("No Return"); the network also airs current and classic telenovelas during the daytime hours (among the initial titles featured on its daytime lineup included Yo Soy Betty, la Fea ("I Am Betty, the Ugly"), the Colombian series that served as the basis for the Televisa novela La Fea Más Bella and the ABC comedy-drama series Ugly Betty, which returned to the network in November 2014). Telenovelas originally aired on the network only on weekdays and in late-night on Saturdays; in April 2014, the network added a three-hour block of comedic and seriocomic telenovelas on Saturday afternoons (which was inaugurated with the network debuts of La Playita ("The Beach"), Las Clinicas ("The Clinic") and the teen-oriented Chica Vampiro ("Vampire Girl")).

Until June 30, 2014, MundoFox filled much of its late night and early morning schedule with same-day repeats of telenovelas and teleseries from its daytime schedule as well as novelas exclusive to the late night schedule; the network dropped the overnight and morning repeats on July 1, 2014, replacing them with a mix of Spanish-dubbed and English language infomercials in the 1:00 to 9:00 a.m. Eastern Time slot, giving it the highest infomercial total of any fully programmed commercial television network in the U.S. (MundoFox's nine hours of daily paid programming content surpassed the six hours carried by competitor Estrella TV among the Spanish broadcast networks, and the eight hours carried by Ion Television (until that network reduced its infomercial block to six hours in January 2015) amongst all networks).

Lifestyle programs (consisting of how-to and cooking series) also aired on the network during the morning hours, particularly on Saturdays; the network also aired game shows, including 100 latinos dijeron ("100 Latinos Said"; which was based on Family Feud) and the now-cancelled Minuto para ganar (which continued to air in reruns as of 2015, and was based on Minute to Win It). The network also aired feature films on weekend afternoons, Saturday evenings and select major holidays (such as Thanksgiving, Christmas and New Year's Day), under the umbrella brand "Cine MundoMax" (originally "Cine MundoFox" until July 26, 2015), consisted of a mix of films produced in Spanish (mainly those from predominately first-language Spanish-speaking countries such as Mexico) or Spanish-dubbed versions of movies originally produced in English (including many produced by sister film studio 20th Century Fox and its subsidiaries). The network also originally aired Spanish dubs of select Fox series (such as Bones and American Dad!), which were dropped from the schedule by January 2014.

Many of the initial original scripted series that air on MundoFox were produced in Colombia, though the network planned to produce U.S.-based series by its second year at the latest. Even though the network's initial slogan was Americano como tú ("American Like You"), MundoFox's president at the time, Emiliano Saccone, said during its 2013-14 upfront presentation that he planned for the network to increase its "Mexican flavor."

It is unknown if any of the programs on MundoMax will air on any other Spanish networks once the shutdown occurred at the end of November. However, its website continued to offer free streaming episodes until mid-December 2016.

=== News programming ===
From August 2012 until July 2015 as MundoFox, the network operated its own news division, Noticias MundoFox ("MundoFox News"), which aimed to offer content that was conscious of the Hispanic market in the United States, and the diversity and sensitivities of the different demographics that comprise that market. Noticias MundoFox's operations included a Los Angeles-based newsroom and a bureau in Washington, D.C., as well as international news content from RCN Televisión's sister international cable news channel, NTN24. The Noticias MundoFox division was operated independently from Fox News Channel, which produces Fox News Sunday and other news content for MundoFox's sister English-language broadcast network, Fox.

Noticias MundoFox produced a weekday evening news program of the same name, which was anchored for most of its run by Rolando Nichols (formerly of the network's Los Angeles affiliate KWHY-TV), that originated from Los Angeles; two live half-hour newscasts were produced every weekday, one for the east coast and the other for the west coast (originally airing at 6:00 p.m., before moving to 5:30 p.m. Eastern Time in 2013) as well as a pre-recorded newscast at 10:30 p.m. Eastern Time (which also originally aired at 10:00 p.m. Eastern until 2013), which was lighter in tone compared to the 5:30 p.m. edition. In 2013, the network launched a supplementary news and features program, MundoFox Y Ya! ("MundoFox Now"), which served as a lead-in to the flagship Noticias MundoFox broadcasts. In addition to conventional news programming, the network also produced Central Fox en MundoFox ("Fox Central on MundoFox"), an hour-long late night sports highlight and analysis program on Sundays produced by Fox Deportes that was cancelled in January 2015; it also produced an afternoon entertainment news and talk program, Que No Te Cuenten ("What They Won't Tell You"), which lasted until its cancellation in August 2014.

Under Fox, MundoFox planned to further expand the amount of news programming on its schedule over time; to help bolster its news division, in November 2012, MundoFox tapped former CNN anchor Rick Sanchez, a contributor to Fox News and its Fox News Latino companion website, to present daily contributions to Noticias MundoFox and host several news specials for the network. However, RCN's takeover of the network led to Noticias MundoFox being cancelled on July 28, 2015, with its time slots being replaced by dubbed reruns of the TruTV caught-on-tape video programs Most Shocking and Most Daring. All the network's news staff, including on-air talent was fired as a result of the shutdown of the news division.

=== Sports programming ===
Sports programming featured on MundoMax formerly had U.S. Spanish-language broadcast rights to the Ultimate Fighting Championship. These rights were effectively lost in the FIC/RCN split, and the network carried no sporting events unless they were time brokered through an outside company.

=== Children's programming ===
In September 2012, shortly after it launched as MundoFox, the network debuted a weekend morning children's program block – which originally aired on both Saturdays and Sundays, before being relegated exclusively to Sunday mornings in 2013 – that was produced in conjunction with National Geographic Kids and Bento Box Entertainment, "National Geographic Niños", which featured live-action and animated series selected to comply with educational programming guidelines set by the Federal Communications Commission; in January 2015, the block was extended to a stripped format, with a half-hour of educational programs airing on weekdays and an additional hour on Sunday mornings.

In September 2013, the network launched a secondary two-hour-long children's program block on Sunday mornings, "XtremaFox", consisting of action-oriented animated series. Following the rebranding as MundoMax, the network's non-E/I children's programming was branded under the banner name "XtremaMax", while the E/I programming was branded under the name "MundoMax Kids".

With the RCN takeover, the Bento Box/National Geographic block was dropped for programming imported from Colombia by RCN in a three-hour Saturday-only block, including Historias clasificadas, Betty Toons, and a Spanish dub of the former PBS series It's a Big Big World (known in Spanish as Un mundo grandote). A Spanish dub of the Universal Kids series Wibbly Pig aired on Monday mornings to fulfill the full three hour requirements.

== Stations ==
By October 2015, MundoMax had affiliation agreements with 60 additional television stations in 57 television markets, encompassing 22 U.S. and two Mexican states, the District of Columbia and the U.S. possession of Puerto Rico. Counting only conventional terrestrial affiliates, the network had a combined national reach of 38.83% of all households in the United States (or 121,322,371 Americans with at least one television set).

In the eight months between the announcement of its formation and the network's formal launch, MundoMax expected to have an estimated national affiliate reach of 75% of U.S. households with at least one television set at the time of its launch. By early March 2012, the network reached charter affiliation deals with 20 stations including KWHY-TV in Los Angeles (which served as the network's West Coast flagship station), WJAN-CD in Miami, KGMC in Fresno and KFWD in Dallas–Fort Worth. These early deals gave MundoFox affiliates in five of the top 10 Hispanic markets and cover at least 40% of U.S. Hispanic households. However, MundoMax's affiliation with WJAN-CD ended on December 28, 2012, with the network's programming moving to full-power station WGEN-TV, then owned by Caracol Television (RCN's main rival in Colombia) through subsidiary Mapale LLC.

48 stations from MundoMax's initial 50-station affiliate body also committed to developing in-house news departments to provide locally produced Spanish-language newscasts to the markets served by the stations, a small number of whom did not have a Spanish-language news option on local television at the time of the network's launch (KWHY and WGEN-TV already operated their own news departments; the former shut down its news operation in August 2015, when RCN Televisión took over KWHY's operations under an outsourcing agreement with its owners, the Meruelo Group). Some affiliates that did not carry full-fledged newscasts had the option to produce two-minute local news capsules inserted into the network's Noticias MundoFox national evening newscasts, weather updates or air local public affairs programming.

Any remaining affiliates prior to the closure on November 30, 2016, had already exercised the option to switch to similar Spanish programming or change affiliations/formats altogether. In the third quarter of 2016 alone, affiliates in Puerto Rico, Dallas, Chicago, and a few other markets have abruptly changed programming or went silent.

== Internet presences ==
MundoMax maintained a website, streaming episodes of the network's existing primetime series after ceasing on-air operations, though there is little notice about it leaving the air. The network's Twitter account was cleared of the network's tweets since October 2016 days before its end, along with their Instagram. The MundoMax Facebook also remained active in an unmonitored state (besides automated posts from RCN's "Es Trending"), with questions about the network's demise going unanswered by the page's moderators. As of December 4, 2016, the Facebook page has been deactivated, and a couple weeks after that, the website was redirected to the URL of RCN Nuestra Tele Internacional, RCN's international subscription network which remains carried in the "Latino" or "Hispanic" tier of most American pay television systems.

== Legal issues ==
One day prior to MundoMax closing down, KM Communications (the owner of then-affiliated station WOCK-CD in Chicago) filed a lawsuit against the network, alleging fraud, breach of contract, unfair business practices and false promises with no intention to keep them (mainly involving the network acting as WOCK-CD's agent for advertising sales), seeking a jury trial and $525,000 in damages. Belinda Vega, an attorney who represents KM LPTV says "MundoMax committed to certain obligations and failed to fulfill their promises.".
