= List of television stations in Puerto Rico =

This is a list of broadcast television stations that are licensed in the Commonwealth of Puerto Rico.

== Full-power ==
- Stations are arranged by media market served and channel position.

Full-power television stations in Puerto Rico
Media market	Station	Channel	Primary affiliation(s)	Notes	Refs
Mayagüez	WIPM-TV	3	Educational independent	(Note: Satellite of WIPR-TV.)	
Mayagüez	WNJX-TV	4	Independent, Telemundo on 2.12	(Note: Satellite of WAPA-TV and WKAQ-TV.)	
Mayagüez	WORA-TV	5	ABC		
Mayagüez	WOLE-DT	12	TeleOnce	(Note: Licensed to Aguadilla, Puerto Rico.) (Note: Satellite of WLII-DT.)	
Mayagüez	WOST	14	Aqui TV		
Mayagüez	WVEO	18	Daystar Español, Daystar on 18.2	(Note: Satellite of WTCV.)	
Mayagüez	WJWN-TV	24	América Tevé	(Note: Licensed to San Sebastián, Puerto Rico.) (Note: Satellite of WJPX.)	
Mayagüez	WIRS	42	Sonlife	(Note: Licensed to Yauco, Puerto Rico.)	
Mayagüez	WCLO-TV	50	Cielo TV	(Note: Licensed to Aguada, Puerto Rico.)	
Mayagüez	WCCV-TV	54	Religious independent	(Note: Licensed to Arecibo, Puerto Rico.)	
Ponce	WTIN-TV	4	Independent, Telemundo on 2.11		
Ponce	WSTE-DT	7	Univision/UniMás, WIPR on 7.2		
Ponce	WSUR-DT	9	TeleOnce		
Ponce	WVOZ-TV	18	Daystar Español, Daystar on 18.2		
Ponce	WKPV	24	America Tevé		
Ponce	WQTO	26	PBS	(Note: Satellite of WMTJ.)	
San Juan	WKAQ-TV	2	Telemundo, NBC on 2.3		
San Juan	WAPA-TV	4	Independent		
San Juan	WRFB	5	ABC	(Note: Licensed to Carolina, Puerto Rico.) (Note: Satellite of WORA-TV.)	
San Juan	WIPR-TV	6	Educational independent		
San Juan	WRUA	8.8	Tiva TV	(Note: Licensed to Fajardo, Puerto Rico.)	
San Juan	WLII-DT	11	TeleOnce	(Note: Licensed to Caguas, Puerto Rico.)	
San Juan	WORO-DT	13	Religious independent		
San Juan	WTCV	18	Daystar Español, Daystar on 18.2		
San Juan	WJPX	24	América TeVé		
San Juan	WELU	34	CTN International	(Note: Licensed to Toa Baja, Puerto Rico.)	
San Juan	WDWL	36	Enlace	(Note: Licensed to Bayamón, Puerto Rico.)	
San Juan	WMTJ	40	PBS		
San Juan	WIDP	46	Religious independent	(Note: Licensed to Guayama, Puerto Rico.)	
San Juan	WUJA	58	Religious independent		
San Juan	WECN	64	Religious independent	(Note: Licensed to Naranjito, Puerto Rico.)	
San Juan	WVSN	68	Religious independent	(Note: Licensed to Humacao, Puerto Rico.) (Note: Satellite of WCCV-TV.)	

== Low-power ==
Low-power television stations in Puerto Rico
Media market	Station	Channel	Primary affiliation(s)	Notes	Refs
Mayagüez	W06DA-D	6	[Blank]		
Mayagüez	W08EJ-D	8	[Blank]	(Note: Licensed to Añasco, Puerto Rico.)	
Mayagüez	WKHD-LD	15	[Blank]		
Mayagüez	WSJP-LD	18	Cozi TV, Fox on 18.2		
Mayagüez	W02CU-D	28	Silent		
Mayagüez	W22FA-D	34	[Blank]		
Mayagüez	WNTE-LD	36	Religious independent		
Mayagüez	WTPM-LD	45	Religious independent		
Ponce	W16CW-D	16	[Blank]	(Note: Licensed to Villalba, Puerto Rico.)	
Ponce	WSTN-LD	18	[Blank]	(Note: Licensed to Isabela, Puerto Rico.)	
Ponce	WUSP-LD	25	Daystar		
Ponce	W02CS-D	28	Silent		
Ponce	W35DS-D	35	[Blank]		
San Juan	WNVI-LD	3	Religious independent	(Note: Licensed to Guaynabo, Puerto Rico.)	
San Juan	W08EI-D	8	Silent		
San Juan	W04DV-D	10	[Blank]		
San Juan	W17DL-D	17	Silent		
San Juan	W18DZ-D	18	[Blank]	(Note: Licensed to Ceiba, Puerto Rico.)	
San Juan	W20DQ-D	20	Silent	(Note: Licensed to Luquillo, Puerto Rico.)	
San Juan	WIMN-CD	20	Independent		
San Juan	WSJN-CD	20	CTNi		
San Juan	WVDO-LD	22	[Blank]		
San Juan	W32FB-D	23	[Blank]		
San Juan	WXWZ-LD	23	Independent		
San Juan	W19EP-D	24	[Blank]	(Note: Licensed to Culebra, Puerto Rico.)	
San Juan	W19EY-D	25	[Blank]		
San Juan	W02CT-D	28	[Blank]		
San Juan	W20DR-D	28	[Blank]		
San Juan	W31DV-D	31	[Blank]		
San Juan	W17EA-D	32	[Blank]	(Note: Licensed to Arroyo, Puerto Rico.)	
San Juan	W33ED-D	34	[Blank]	(Note: Licensed to Vieques, Puerto Rico.)	
San Juan	WWXY-LD	38	Independent		
San Juan	WSJU-LD	42	[Blank]		
San Juan	W10DD-D	44	3ABN Latino		
San Juan	W30ED-D	44	Religious independent		
San Juan	W33EL-D	44	[Blank]		

== Translators ==
Television station translators in Puerto Rico
Media market	Station	Channel	Translating	Notes	Refs
Mayagüez	W05CY-D	5	WORA-TV		
Mayagüez	W10BG-D	10	W05CY-D		
Mayagüez	W21CX-D	12	WOLE-DT		
Mayagüez	WWKQ-LD	19	WOST	(Note: Licensed to Quebradillas, Puerto Rico.)	
Mayagüez	WQSJ-CD	48	WSJN-CD		
Mayagüez	W27DZ-D	51	WOST		
Mayagüez	W16DX-D	54	WCCV-TV		
Ponce	W28EH-D	2	WKAQ-TV	(Note: Licensed to Adjuntas, Puerto Rico.)	
Ponce	W05DB-D	5	WORA-TV		
Ponce	W08EH-D	5	WORA-TV		
Ponce	WQQZ-CD	14	WOST		
Ponce	W13DI-D	54	WCCV-TV		
San Juan	W09AT-D	2	WKAQ-TV		
San Juan	W28EQ-D	2	WKAQ-TV	(Note: Licensed to Utuado, Puerto Rico.)	
San Juan	W05DA-D	5	WORA-TV		
San Juan	W29EE-D	5	WORA-TV	(Note: Licensed to San Lorenzo, Puerto Rico.)	
San Juan	WVQS-LD	8	WSJN-CD	(Note: Licensed to Isabel Segunda, Puerto Rico.)	
San Juan	W20DS-D	10	WVDO-LD		
San Juan	W20EJ-D	26	WOST		

== Defunct ==
- WITA-TV San Juan (1966–1967)
- WMEI Arecibo (2007–2017)
- WSJU-TV San Juan (1985–2017)

== See also ==
- Media of Puerto Rico

== Bibliography ==
- "United States TV Stations: Puerto Rico", Yearbook of Radio and Television, New York: Radio Television Daily, 1964, OCLC 7469377 – via Internet Archive
- Pedro Miranda Corrada (1974). "La cable television en Puerto Rico". Revista Jurídica de la Universidad de Puerto Rico (in Spanish) (42).
