= WWXY-LD =

Television station in San Juan, Puerto Rico

Translator of WSTN-LD, Isabela–Mayagüez
- San Juan; Puerto Rico
- Channels: Digital: 2 (VHF); Virtual: 19, 25, 62

Programming
- Affiliations: 19.1: The Retro Channel; 25.1: Boricua TV; 62.1: Maranatha Radio Ministries TV

Ownership
- Owner: Héctor Marcano Martinez

History
- Founded: 2001
- Former call signs: W62CW (1998–2006); WWXY-LP (2006–2012)
- Former channel numbers: Analog: 62 (UHF, 1998–2006), 38 (UHF, 2006–2012); Digital: 38 (UHF, 2012–2018), 6 (VHF, 2018–2022)
- Former affiliations: Religious (1998–2006); Metro Canal (2006–2008); Acción TV (2008–2010 & 2022); Destino TV (2010-2012); Tiva TV (2012–2015); Dark (2015–2016, 2018–2019); Translator of WIPR-TV (2017–2018); TuBox TV (2019–2021); Canal 38 SJ (2021–2022); TVO (2022-2023); Héctor Marcano TV (2023-2024); DT2: The Retro Channel (2016–2018); DT3: Translator of WORO-DT (2017–2018)

Technical information
- Licensing authority: FCC
- Facility ID: 64856
- Class: LD
- ERP: 2.0 kW
- HAAT: 500 m (1,640 ft)
- Transmitter coordinates: 18°16′41.8″N 66°6′33.5″W

Links
- Public license information: LMS
- Website: www.boricuatv.net www.hectormarcanotv.com

WWXY-LD (channel 19) is an independent television station licensed to San Juan, Puerto Rico. The station is owned by Héctor Marcano Martinez. WWXY-LD's studios are located at the Metro Tower on Avenida Ponce de León in Santurce and its transmitter at Cerro la Marquesa in Aguas Buenas.

== History ==
On September 25, 2017, Due to the passage of Hurricane Irma and Hurricane Maria in Puerto Rico, WIPR-TV (owned by Puerto Rico Public Broadcasting Corporation) simulcast programming on channel 38.1, The Retro Channel on 38.2 and WORO-DT (TeleOro Canal 13) operate on channel 38.3.

On January 1, 2022, WWXY-LD ended its TuBox TV streaming service and became a news-intensive independent station, branded as Acción TV, which simulcast iHeartMedia's Acción Radio programming from its studios in Orlando, Florida. On September 1, 2022, WWXY-LD returns as a general entertainment independent station, rebranding itself as TVO.

== Programming ==
WWXY-LD primarily features news and talk programming, including local programs produced by Marcom Group. Also, WWXY-LD shows public affairs & children's programming. WWXY-LD also broadcasts religious programming from Maranatha Radio Ministries. Paid programming is shown at other times of the day.

== Subchannels ==
Subchannels of WWXY-LD
Channel	Video	Short name	Programming
19.1	1080i	WSTN-LD	The Retro Channel
25.1	480i	BORI TV	Boricua TV
62.1	480i	WRRE-TV	Maranatha Radio Ministries TV
