= WORO =

WORO may refer to:

- WORO (FM), a radio station (92.5 FM) licensed to serve Corozal, Puerto Rico
- WORO-DT, a television station (channel 13) licensed to serve Fajardo, Puerto Rico
- Write Once, Read Occasionally; see Non-RAID drive architectures § MAID
