= W17EA-D =

Television station in Arroyo, Puerto Rico

Translator of WIDP, Guayama, Puerto Rico
- Arroyo; Puerto Rico
- Channels: Digital: 17 (UHF); Virtual: 25, 46

Programming
- Subchannels: 25.11: Cielo TV; 46.1: EBN TV; 46.2: Triunfo 96.9 FM; 46.3: Bethel TV; 46.4: Aliento Visión

Ownership
- Owner: Ebenezer Broadcasting Group, Inc.
- Sister stations: WIDP, WNRT

History
- Founded: 2010
- First air date: 2014
- Former call signs: W32DV-D (2010–2021)
- Former channel numbers: Digital: 32 (UHF, 2014–2021); Virtual: 32 (2014–2022)
- Former affiliations: Independent (2014–2016); ZUUS Latino (2016–2017); Silent (2017–2019); TBN (2019–2020); Translator of WVSN (2020–2022)

Technical information
- Licensing authority: FCC
- Facility ID: 182687
- ERP: 15 kW
- HAAT: 570 m (1,870 ft)
- Transmitter coordinates: 17°59′28.0″N 66°6′23.0″W

Links
- Public license information: LMS
- Website: www.ebnpr.tv

W17EA-D (channel 46) is a low-powered religious television station licensed to Arroyo and serving southeastern Puerto Rico. The station is owned by Ebenezer Broadcasting Group. The station's transmitter is located at Los Veteranos Avenue in Guayama. Its parent station maintains studios on Simón Madera Avenue in San Juan.

== Subchannels ==
The station's digital signal is multiplexed:

Subchannels of WIDP
| Channel | Video | Short name | Programming |
|---|---|---|---|
| 25.11 | 720p | WIDP | Cielo TV |
| 46.1 | 720p | WIDP | EBN TV / Aliento Visión |
| 46.2 | 720p | WIDP | Triunfo 96.9 FM |
| 46.3 | 720p | WIDP | Bethel TV |

Simulcast of subchannels of another station
