= Channel 37 virtual TV stations in the United States =

The following television stations operate on virtual channel 37 in the United States:

- WIMN-CD in Arecibo, Puerto Rico
- WNWT-LD in New York City
- KSLM-LD in Salem, Oregon
