= Fox 13 =

Fox 13 may refer to one of the following television stations in the United States affiliated with the Fox Broadcasting Company:

== Current ==
=== Owned-and-operated stations ===
- KCPQ in Tacoma–Seattle, Washington
- WTVT in Tampa–St. Petersburg, Florida

=== Affiliates ===
- KRQE in Albuquerque–Santa Fe, New Mexico
- KSTU in Salt Lake City, Utah
- WBKO-DT2, a digital channel of WBKO in Bowling Green, Kentucky
- WGME-DT2, a digital channel of WGME-TV in Portland, Maine
- WHBQ-TV in Memphis, Tennessee

== Formerly affiliated ==
- KHNL in Honolulu, Hawaii (1986–1996)
- WPRV-TV (now WORO-DT) in San Juan, Puerto Rico (1989–1992)
