= WUSP =

WUSP may refer to:

- WUSP (AM), a radio station (1550 AM) licensed to serve Utica, New York, United States
- WUSP-LD, a low-power television station (channel 15, virtual 25) licensed to serve Ponce, Puerto Rico
