= WIMN =

WIMN may be:

- WIMN-CD, a religious, class A digital television station located in Arecibo, Puerto Rico
- WiMN - Women’s International Music Network
- WIMN - Sisingamangaraja XII International Airport
- WIMN-FM
- WIMN-AM
