= WECN =

Television station in Naranjito, Puerto Rico

- Naranjito–San Juan; Puerto Rico
- Channels: Digital: 18 (UHF); Virtual: 8, 16, 64
- Branding: Único TV

Programming
- Subchannels: 8.8/16.1: Tiva TV; 64.1: Único TV
- Affiliations: Religious Independent (2015–present)

Ownership
- Owner: Único TV Media; (a subsidiary of Iglesia Cristiana El Caballero de la Cruz, Inc.); (Encuentro Christian Network)
- Sister stations: WRUA

History
- Founded: June 20, 1983
- First air date: 1986
- Former call signs: WART (1983–1986, CP); WMPE (1986, CP)
- Former channel numbers: Analog: 64 (UHF, 1986–2009); Virtual: 18 (2009–2019)
- Former affiliations: Religious (1986–2007); Independent (2007–2010); teleSUR (2009–2014); HispanTV; (2012–2013); ViVe (2013–2014); Silent (2014–2015)
- Call sign meaning: "Encuentro Christian Network"

Technical information
- Facility ID: 19561
- ERP: 1,000 kW (CP); 50 kW (DTS); 25 kW (STA)
- HAAT: 795 m (2,608 ft)
- Transmitter coordinates: 18°58′56″N 66°59′20″W
- Translator(s): WRUA 64.2 Fajardo

Links
- Website: www.unicotv.com

WECN (channel 64), branded on-air as Único TV, is a Spanish Religious television station serving eastern Puerto Rico that is licensed to Naranjito. The station is owned by Único TV Media under its licensee, Encuentro Christian Network. The station's studios are located at Carretera 167, Urbana Rexville in Bayamon and its transmitter is at Barrio Cedro Abajo in Naranjito. WECN programming was also seen on WRUA, channel 33 in Fajardo before that station switched affiliations and frequency to Tiva TV. Since September 24, 2015, WECN returns to the air, broadcasting Religious programming on channel 18.1.

== History ==
WECN began operations in 1986; branded as Telecadena ECN or Encuentro Christian Network, better known as El Canal de Naranjito. WECN thereafter is a Religious Independent station. The station was founded by Televangelist Rafael Torres Ortega, until his death on October 16, 2015. WECN has its studios & offices located at the Iglesia El Caballero de la Cruz Building in Bayamon, Puerto Rico. in the 1990s, WIRS channel 42 in Yauco, (now operated by America CV Network) joins the network and started broadcasting religious programming, throughout the northern Puerto Rico. In 1997, WRUA channel 34 in Fajardo, started broadcasting & joins the Telecadena ECN network, changed its branding to EncuentroVision.

In 2004, Lin Media, the former owners of WAPA-TV & WJPX purchased WIRS for $50,000, leaving WECN & WRUA as the remaining religious stations.

From 2006 to 2007, WRUA operated as a standard independent station, using the Citytv branding, under license from CHUM Limited – it was the first Citytv franchise on American soil. Rogers Media discontinued the licensing for WRUA, after its acquisition of Citytv, and the station now serves as a translator for Tiva TV.

Both prior to its time as Citytv and after, WRUA was and still is a religious station.

In 2009, WECN and WRUA, changed its affiliation with teleSUR, a pan–Latin American terrestrial and satellite news television network from Venezuela. teleSUR is a public company which has various Latin American governments as its sponsors. Its sponsors are the governments of Argentina (20%), Bolivia (5%), Cuba (19%), Ecuador, Nicaragua, Uruguay (10%) and Venezuela (51%).

WECN and WRUA forces to shut down on October 22, 2014, due to financial reasons. as of 2014, WECN is Silent, and its sale is pending to the new officers & directors under Único TV Media for $1.9 million. On March 1, 2015; WRUA returns to the air, and will become a Satellite of WVQS-LD, repeating The Retro Channel on Channel 33.1. On April 17, WRUA will become a full-time Locally owned Independent station, broadcasting Retro Music Videos on channel 33.1, just before WVQS-LD moves CTNi to 50.1 & Telemicro Internacional to WSJU-TV channel 31.1. teleSUR programming is available on Encanto TV, WVDO-LD channel 10.1 in Carolina, W20DQ-D channel 20.1 in Luquillo, W24EI-D channel 22.1 in Naranjito, W02CS-D channel 22.1 in Ponce, W36EP-D channel 22.1 in Yauco, W20DS-D channel 28.1 in Caguas, W20DR-D channel 28.1 in Humacao, W31DV-D channel 31.1 in Guayama, W02CU-D channel 28.1 & WNTE-LD channel 36.1 in Mayaguez. Since September 24, 2015, WECN is back on the air, and will change its branding to Único TV on channel 18.1. The sale of WECN to Único TV Media was completed on September 25, 2015. On November 9, 2015, WECN will simulcast with Tiva TV on channel 18.2, showing lifestyle and health programming.

== Technical information ==
=== Subchannels ===
The station's digital signal is multiplexed:

Channel	Video	Short name	Programming
8.8	720p	TIVA	TIVA TV
64.2	480i	WECN	Único TV

=== Analog-to-digital conversion ===
On February 17, 2009, WECN and WRUA signed off their analog signals. Both WECN/WRUA had completed its digital transmissions, although some people had believed that WECN went digital after WRUA.
