= Channel 54 =

Channel 54 refers to several television stations:

== Canada ==
The following television stations operate on virtual channel 54 in Canada:

- CFTO-DT-54 in Peterborough, Ontario

== See also ==
- Channel 54 virtual TV stations in the United States
