= ABC 5 =

ABC 5 may refer to:

- ABC 5 (American Broadcasting Company affiliates)
- ABC 5, a former name of TV5 (Philippine TV network) owned by TV5 Network Inc.
  - DWET-TV in Metro Manila
