= WITA-TV =

Television station in San Juan, Puerto Rico (1966–1967)

San Juan; Puerto Rico
- Channels: Analog: 30 (UHF)

Programming
- Affiliations: Independent

History
- First air date: June 12, 1966
- Last air date: June 28, 1967; (1 year, 16 days)

Technical information
- ERP: 625 kW
- HAAT: 85 m (280 ft)
- Transmitter coordinates: 18°21′30″N 66°08′00″W

WITA-TV (channel 30) was an independent television station in San Juan, Puerto Rico. It was owned by El Imparcial newspaper and broadcast in English. The station operated from June 1966 to June 1967; the underlying permit continued for several years and was sold to United Hemisphere TV of Puerto Rico but never reactivated. The Federal Communications Commission later voided the sale. The newspaper also held construction permits for ultra high frequency (UHF) stations in Ponce and Mayagüez that were included in the sale but never built.

== History ==
In May 1964, Electronic Enterprises Inc., a company affiliated with the San Juan newspaper El Imparcial and owner of San Juan radio station WITA, applied to the Federal Communications Commission (FCC) to construct three new ultra high frequency (UHF) TV stations in Puerto Rico: channel 30 in San Juan, channel 20 in Ponce, and channel 22 in Mayagüez. The San Juan station received approval on June 16, 1965, followed by the Ponce and Mayagüez stations six months later. El Imparcial Broadcasting Company, which assumed the permit for WITA-TV from Electronic Enterprises, then signed a contract with RCA for a color camera, three black-and-white cameras, and color film equipment, said to be the first complete system of its kind in Puerto Rico.

WITA-TV began broadcasting on June 12, 1966. The station left the air on June 28, 1967, reportedly for financial reasons. A later analysis of the 1972 closure of WTSJ (channel 18), another UHF station, indicated that even then, not all television households on the island could tune the UHF band.

In 1969, El Imparcial Broadcasting arranged sales for all of its properties. WITA-AM-FM in San Juan was sold to Pueblo Broadcasting Company, a division of Pueblo Supermarkets, and WRJS in San Germán was also sold off. The television stations were sold to United Hemisphere TV of Puerto Rico, Inc., a subsidiary of motion picture studio United Hemisphere Pictures. Art Merrill was named general manager of the television stations; he had run the Quality network of English-language FM stations. The $200,000 sale received FCC approval in June 1970, over the objections of Tele San Juan, owner of the English-language WTSJ-TV. United Hemisphere TV immediately announced that the Ponce and Mayagüez stations, under new WUHP-TV and WUHM-TV call letters, would be built as repeaters of WKAQ-TV (Telemundo) in San Juan and that channel 30 would become WUHT-TV and return to the air with English-language programming. United Hemisphere sought approval to upgrade the transmitter of the San Juan station. It went as far as holding a reception for Mayagüez civic leaders to announce the arrival of channel 22.

However, within months, United Hemisphere's television plans fell apart. In November, the commission stayed its grant of previously approved changes to the construction permit for the Mayagüez station on a petition from Tele San Juan and WOLE-TV in Aguadilla. In doing so, it noted that new developments in the firm's financial plans had potentially cast doubt on the earlier finding that the company was financially qualified and that the petitioners had raised claims of lack of complete candor. In federal appeals court, where the petitioners had challenged the sale by El Imparcial to United Hemisphere, the FCC had the case remanded back to the commission. In March 1971, the FCC's Broadcast Bureau asked United Hemisphere to demonstrate its financial qualifications. No reply was ever received, and the commission set aside its approval of the sale on May 26, 1971.
