= Jewish Life Television =

- Country: United States
- Broadcast area: North America
- Headquarters: Los Angeles; New York City; Toronto, Ontario, Canada; Hatillo, PR

Programming
- Language: English
- Picture format: 480i (SDTV)

Ownership
- Owner: JLTV, LLC (Privately Owned)

History
- Launched: 2007 (17 years ago)

Links
- Website: www.jltv.tv

Availability

Terrestrial
- WIMN-CD (Arecibo, PR): 36.1

Streaming media
- Digital media receiver: Roku

Jewish Life Television (JLTV) is an American entertainment television network broadcasting Jewish–themed programming. The network was founded in 2007 by Phil Blazer, a longtime journalist and producer of programming for the Jewish community; Blazer remained with the network until his death in August 2020. The JLTV is funded by the Jewish Life Foundation, and its remaining earnings come from advertising.

In the United States, JLTV is available in almost 50 million households through Comcast, Spectrum and DirecTV as well as various regional cable systems, in addition to offering a live feed of its programming on the Internet. JLTV's broadcast facilities are located in Los Angeles, California.

== Programming ==
JLTV's newest programming features shows, such as international favorites Fauda and Prisoners of War along with many other news, sports, lifestyle and entertainment programming. These include films, documentaries, music, reviews, interviews, reality shows such as InOverOurHeads and special events, such as programming from the Maccabiah Games.

An agreement was made with the Israeli Broadcasting Authority's second outlet Channel 33 to relay JLTV's programs to Israeli over-the-air and cable television, as well as by satellite to Europe and the Middle East in 2009, but its implementation was sluggish due to bureaucracy problems at the broadcaster, coupled by a string of resignations.

In 2019, the network launched the original series, Bubbies Know Best, featuring three Jewish grandmothers serving as matchmakers for a variety of people searching for romance. In 2020, JLTV premiered an episode of their global travel series Air Land & Sea featuring Porto, Portugal, which was awarded "Outstanding Religion Documentary" by the Religion News Association. JLTV, the Museum of Jewish Heritage and JewishGen announced the co-production of a Jewish genealogy series called Generations, set to premiere in 2023.

The network also carries a collection of classic general-interest series with Jewish hosts or leads, including The Jack Benny Program, That Show with Joan Rivers, Candid Camera with Allen Funt, You Bet Your Life with Groucho Marx, The Soupy Sales Show, Bonanza (Lorne Greene and Michael Landon), the Ukrainian sitcom Servant of the People (Volodymyr Zelenskyy) and the mid-20th century dramedy The Goldbergs, along with general-interest public domain Westerns and sitcoms (The Lucy Show, The Beverly Hillbillies, Stories of the Century and Annie Oakley). As of 2023, JLTV also broadcasts the original 1951-59 version of Dragnet.

In 2021, JLTV announced that they would be the first cable television channel in North America to broadcast the two award-winning thriller series Fauda and Prisoners of War.

As of 2025, JLTV has expanded its online offerings into a free ad-supported streaming television suite, which includes the main JLTV service, a fitness channel, a comedy channel, a channel with Israel-centered content, a "classic" channel with public domain shows, and a full-time channel devoted to Soupy Sales.

== Canadian distribution ==
In 2011, JLTV was officially added to the CRTC's approved list of foreign services, allowing the channel to expand into Canada. Ethnic Channels Group, who sponsored the application to get JLTV on the approved list, is the official Canadian distributor of the channel. In July 2014, JLTV officially launched in Canada on Bell Fibe TV.
