= Channel 54 virtual TV stations in the United States =

The following television stations operate on virtual channel 54 in the United States:

- K11LP-D in Cortez, Colorado
- K21OC-D in Corpus Christi, Texas
- K31KW-D in Richland, Washington
- KAJB in Calipatria, California
- KAZA-TV in Avalon, California
- KCEB in Longview, Texas
- KNVA in Austin, Texas
- KQEH in San Jose, California
- KUFS-LD in Fort Smith, Arkansas
- KVVG-LD in Porterville, California
- W13DI-D in Yauco, etc., Puerto Rico
- W16DX-D in Aguada, Puerto Rico
- WCCV-TV in Arecibo, Puerto Rico
- WCVN-TV in Covington, Kentucky
- WFXG in Augusta, Georgia
- WJGP-LD in Kalamazoo, Michigan
- WNUV in Baltimore, Maryland
- WPXK-TV in Jellico, Tennessee
- WQLN in Erie, Pennsylvania
- WRTD-CD in Raleigh, North Carolina
- WTBY-TV in Poughkeepsie, New York
- WTLJ in Muskegon, Michigan
- WUPL in Slidell, Louisiana
- WXTX in Columbus, Georgia
- WZDX in Huntsville, Alabama

The following stations, which are no longer licensed, formerly operated on virtual channel 54:

- WEYS-LD in Miami, Florida
