= Puerto Rico Public Broadcasting Corporation =

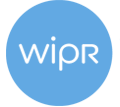
- Type: Non-commercial; broadcast television; public broadcaster
- Country: Puerto Rico
- TV stations: WIPR-TV
- Radio stations: WIPR, WIPR-FM
- Headquarters: San Juan, Puerto Rico
- Callsigns: WIPR, WIPM
- Official website: www.wipr.pr

The Puerto Rico Public Broadcasting Corporation (Spanish: Corporación de Puerto Rico para la Difusión Pública) is the government-owned corporation of Puerto Rico responsible for public broadcasting for the government of Puerto Rico. It was founded in 1949 under the Department of Public Instruction to serve as the primary broadcasting corporation in Puerto Rico. The Corporation owns and operates several radio and television stations, including WIPR (AM), WIPR-FM, and WIPR-TV.

== Radio stations ==
City of license	Callsign	Frequency	Format
San Juan	WIPR	940 AM	Sports radio
San Juan	WIPR-FM	91.3 FM	Classical

== Television stations ==
City of license	Callsign	Channel (Digital)	Channel (Virtual)
San Juan	WIPR-TV	26 (UHF)	6 (VHF)
Mayagüez	WIPM-TV	32 (UHF)	3 (VHF)
Carolina	WVDO-LD	4 (VHF)	6 (VHF)
Mayaguez	WNTE-LD	30 (UHF)	6 (VHF)
