= WIPR-FM =

Classical music radio station in San Juan, Puerto Rico

- San Juan, Puerto Rico; Puerto Rico
- Broadcast area: Puerto Rico
- Frequency: 91.3 MHz
- Branding: Allegro 91.3

Programming
- Format: Classical
- Affiliations: NPR (1970–present); Classical 24 (2021–present)

Ownership
- Owner: Corporación de Puerto Rico para la Difusión Pública; (Puerto Rico Public Broadcasting Corporation)
- Sister stations: WIPR (AM), WIPR-TV, WIPM-TV

History
- First air date: June 3, 1960; 66 years ago
- Call sign meaning: "Wonderful Island of Puerto Rico"

Technical information
- Licensing authority: FCC
- Facility ID: 53860
- Class: B
- ERP: 125,000 watts
- HAAT: 852.0 meters (2,795.3 ft)
- Transmitter coordinates: 18°56′42″N 66°53′35.9″W

Links
- Public license information: Public file; LMS
- Website: www.wipr.pr

WIPR-FM (91.3 MHz), branded on-air as Allegro 91.3, is a radio station broadcasting a classical format, but the station also broadcasts some NPR programs. Licensed to San Juan, Puerto Rico, the station is currently owned by la Corporación de Puerto Rico para la Difusión Pública.

== See also ==
- WIPR (AM)
- WIPR-TV
