= InOverOurHeads =

- Genre: Documentary-style reality television
- Directed by: Malkah Winter
- Starring: Malkah Winter; Yitzi Cusner; Valerie Frank; Simcha Weinberg; Marc Hirsch
- Theme music composer: Scott Altham; Jacinda Espinosa
- Opening theme: Hear Us Now (Poptastic Mix)
- Country of origin: United States
- Original language: English
- No. of seasons: 1
- No. of episodes: 11

Production
- Executive producer: Malkah Winter
- Production locations: Sharon, Massachusetts; Greater Boston; New York metropolitan area
- Running time: Approx. 22 minutes (excluding commercials)

Original release
- Network: JLTV - Jewish Life Television
- Release: May 4 – July 7, 2010

InOverOurHeads is a Jewish documentary-style reality television series currently airing on JLTV - the Jewish Life Television network. It is produced in Sharon, Massachusetts and is shot on location in Greater Boston and the New York metropolitan area. The show was originally created for public-access television, but subsequently was completely revamped for a national audience.

InOverOurHeads is believed to be the first unscripted Jewish reality series. From Date to Mate, which aired on Shalom TV in 2009 utilizes the reality style, but is a fully scripted production featuring professional actors.

Matthue Roth of MyJewishLearning.com calls InOverOurHeads "The Orthodox Jersey Shore. Linda Keenan of the Huffington Post calls the show "The View for Jews".

== Premise ==
InOverOurHeads primarily features Jewish parents in their 20s and 30s who appear to struggle with the challenges of everyday life. Each episode is self-contained and explores a specific subject matter, such as an emotion or Jewish ritual.

While the show is set around an Orthodox Jewish community, the cast members vary in their religious affiliation and level of observance. One cast member, Valerie identifies herself as a Reform Jew, while others vary from Modern Orthodox to Hasidic to an apostate of Orthodox Judaism. The latest cast member, Marc identifies himself as a secular Jew, having been brought up with little knowledge of his Jewish heritage. Marc is also the first single cast member, opening up new avenues for the show to explore Jewish dating and single life.

The show varies from traditional Jewish television programming in that the cast consists neither of professional actors nor subject-matter experts (such as rabbis).

== Episodes ==
| Episode Number | Title | Air Date | Description |
|---|---|---|---|
| 1 | Living Waters | May 4, 2010 | What is the mikveh (ritualarium)? Valerie has never been before. She finds an unexpected emotional experience that goes far beyond family purity. |
| 2 | She Loves to Dance | May 11, 2010 | An Orthodox Jewish mother from Monsey, New York frequents the Manhattan nightclub scene to satisfy her desires for music and dancing. |
| 3 | Expectations | May 25, 2010 | Whether it's parents, spouse, community, or even God, we are often held to high expectations. What are the results of a life lived only to satisfy others? |
| 4 | Happiness | June 1, 2010 | What makes people happy? Is it time with children, music, freedom, spirituality, sex? |
| 5 | Marc | June 8, 2010 | Marc is a music critic and alumnus of Harvard. He wants to meet a Jewish girl, but knows little about Judaism. Malkah takes Marc to meet a shadchan (Jewish matchmaker) and explores what makes men think about when searching for a woman. |
