= Yiye Ávila =

American evangelist

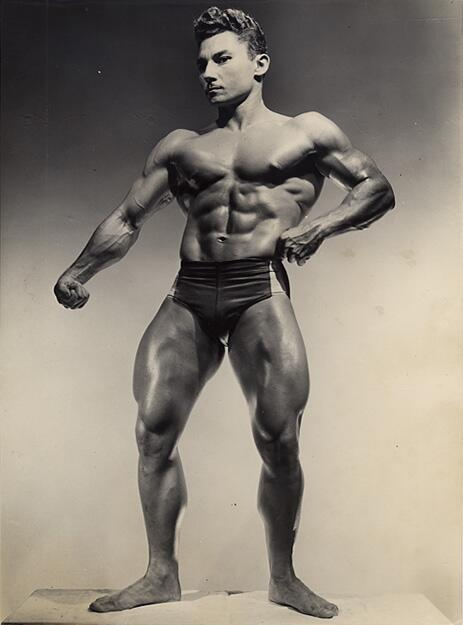
- Born: José Joaquín Ávila Portalatín; September 20, 1925; Camuy, Puerto Rico
- Died: June 28, 2013 (aged 87); Camuy, Puerto Rico
- Education: Interamerican University of Puerto Rico San Germán campus (BS)
- Occupation: Evangelist
- Spouse: Carmen Delia Talavera (m. ?)
- Children: Noemí (+), Doris Myrna, and Carmen Ilia (+)
- Religion: Evangelical Christian
- Congregations served: Ministerio Cristo Viene; Cadena del Milagro
- Professional bodybuilder

Best statistics

Professional (Pro) career
- Best win: NPC Mr Puerto Rico; 1952–1953
- Website: http://yiyeavila.org/

José Joaquín Ávila Portalatín (September 20, 1925 – June 28, 2013), better known as Yiye Ávila, was a Puerto Rican Pentecostal Evangelist and writer of Sephardic origins. His preaching and messages were characterized in proclaiming that the coming of Christ is imminent. He is considered one of the most influential Protestant preachers of the Spanish language. He was also the second runner-up for Mr. North America in 1953.

== Early life ==
José Joaquín Ávila Portalatín was born in Camuy, Puerto Rico. His parents, Pablo Ávila and Herminia Portalatin, were both Sephardic Jew schoolteachers that had converted to Christianity, and he eventually followed in their footsteps. He enrolled at the Interamerican University of Puerto Rico San Germán campus, with plans to study medicine. There he graduated with a bachelor's degree in natural sciences and completed his pre-medical studies. He chose to return to his hometown of Camuy and teach chemistry and biology at the local high school, where he taught for the next 22 years. Eventually a change of careers would come about that would take him to over 100 countries.

== Sporting life ==
He began playing baseball in the Double A level and training as a weight lifter. In 1952, he competed and won the Mr. Puerto Rico bodybuilding contest, and would go on to become the second runner-up for the title of Mr. North America in 1953.

While training for the summer Olympic Games of 1956, Ávila experienced terrible pain in parts of his body and, after various tests, was diagnosed with chronic arthritis by his doctors. This prevented him from participating in the Olympics or in any other future sporting event. The pain was so intense that Ávila suffered limited mobility and could not even perform everyday chores. He turned to Christianity and began praying, seeking divine intervention for his situation. According to him, he received a divine revelation through the reading and study of the Protestant Bible, where he received healing from Jesus Christ. From that time on, he dedicated himself to ministry.

== Evangelism ==
Although Yiye Ávila was always deeply interested in Christianity, he reportedly was convinced to dedicate all his life and work to evangelism after watching a Christian television show hosted by Oral Roberts, an American televangelist, in the early 1960s. In 1967, Ávila retired after 22 years as a teacher and began to concentrate on Christian work instead.

He became a full-time preacher and, in 1972, he invited several friends, family, and neighbors to form the Escuadron Relampago Cristo Viene ("Christ Is Coming Lightning Squadron"), which congregated in a small room in his house to discuss the Bible, salvation, Christianity, and the Apocalypse. Eventually, his ministry and followers increased dramatically, and a new three-story building near the PR # 2 state road was built to accommodate the attending public. His preaching was followed by various church groups and many Latin American evangelists invited him to preach to their local communities and churches. This demand prompted Yiye to create a radio program and, eventually, a television network called Cadena Del Milagro (Miracle Network) so that his preaching could reach those same communities that he visited.

The network and his ministry has grown considerably over the years, expanding to magazines, books, audio tapes, videos and televised scheduled programming. The three-story building which he and his close followers originally built now serves as the headquarters for Yiye's ministry and his television network.

Beginning in the 1970s, Yiye became a laborious evangelist, visiting almost all Latin American countries, many North American cities, and parts of Europe. He appeared on a daily morning telecast preaching selected verses from the Bible and receiving prayer petitions from viewers. He also appeared every Saturday night on the network's flagship show, Campaña Por TV (Campaigning Through TV), where he preached selected verses of the New Testament, presented Evangelical Christian music groups, and invited viewers to convert to Evangelical Christianity.

In his shows, he encouraged viewers to congregate by going to Evangelical Christian churches and to form Evangelical Christian groups to discuss the Bible and current events. These shows and many other programs are broadcast in Puerto Rico and the Caribbean, and are transmitted via satellite to Latin America, the continental United States and certain parts of Europe.

In addition to his television shows and public preaching, Yiye Ávila was a prolific writer, publishing numerous works throughout his ministry years. Many of his public preachings have been recorded and published on tapes and compact discs.

== Personal life and death ==
Yiye Ávila was married to Carmen Delia Talavera (better known as Yeya) and had three daughters: Noemí, Doris Myrna, and Carmen Ilia. In 1989, his daughter Carmen Ilia was murdered by her husband. On April 28, 2009, his daughter Noemi Ávila, an Evangelical pastor herself, died in a car accident in Freites, Venezuela.

Although his ministry has expanded across three continents and he has become a household name among Evangelical Christian families in Latin America, he preferred a humble life, reportedly living in the same house he owned and in the same conditions before his ministry began. In 2009, he suffered a debilitating stroke that limited his speech capabilities, and he retired from public preaching. On June 28, 2013, Yiye Ávila died from cardiac arrest at the age of 87. He was buried at Cementerio Municipal el Remanso de Paz in Camuy, Puerto Rico.

== Literary works ==
Title	Theme	Publisher/publishing date	Notes
The Fast of the Lord: Fast of Victory	Fasting; spiritual life	Yiye Ávila (January 1, 1976)	English, ASIN B0007B0N86
Perfecto Amor: Comentarios Basado en 1ra. Corintios 13 (Perfect Love: Commentary Based on Corinthians 1 Chapter 13)	God is love; religious aspects, Christianity	Editorial Unilit (August 1998)	Spanish, ISBN 0-7899-0070-X
Señales De Su Venida (Signs of His Coming)	Second advent; eschatology	Editorial Unilit	Spanish, ISBN 1-56063-433-2
El Engaño (The Deceipt)	Truthfulness and falsehood in religion (religious aspects)	1990	Spanish
Los Dones del Espiritu (The Gifts of the Spirit)	Biography; spiritual	Editorial Unilit	Spanish, ISBN 1-56063-434-0
El Anticristo (The Antichrist)	Antichrist (biblical teaching); the Great Tribulation	Editorial Unlimited	Spanish, ISBN 1-56063-592-4
¿Pasará La Iglesia Por La Gran Tribulación? (Will the Church Go through the Great Tribulation?)	Tribulation (Christian eschatology)	Editorial Unilit	Spanish, ISBN 1-56063-743-9
Sin Santidad Nadie Le Vera (Without Holiness No One Shall See Him)	Sanctity; spiritual healing	Editorial Unilit	Spanish, ISBN 1-56063-742-0
La Ciencia De La Oración (The Science of Prayer)	Prayer; spirituality	Editorial Unilit (December 1995)	Spanish, ISBN 1-56063-633-5
¿Quiénes Se Irán?: El Arrebatamiento De La Iglesia (Who Will Go?: The Rapture of the Church)	Rapture	Editorial Unilit (December 1995)	Spanish, ISBN 1-56063-996-2
Sanidad Divina: Y Por Su Llaga Fuimos Nosotros Curados (Divine Healing: And By His Wounds We Were Healed)	Biography; spiritual healing	Editorial Unilit (December 1995)	Spanish, ISBN 1-56063-634-3
El Cuerpo Glorificado (The Glorified Body)	Resurrection; Afterlife (Christianity)	Editorial Unilit (August 1998)	English and Spanish, ISBN 0-7899-0071-8
Perfecto Amor: Una Exposición Acerca De Cual Y Como Debe Ser El Amor Que Servirá De Puntal	God; love; religious aspects; Christianity	Editorial Unilit	Spanish, ISBN 0-7899-0070-X
El Cristo De Los Milagros (The Christ of Miracles)	Christianity; spiritual healing	Editorial Unilit	Spanish, ISBN 0-7899-0073-4
El Profeta Elías: La Fe Y Obediencia De Un Hombre Que Consagró Su Vida Al Servicio De Dios	Biblical teachings	Editorial Unilit	Spanish, ISBN 0-7899-0074-2
El Sacrificio De La Cruz (The Sacrifice of the Cross)	Biography; atonement; salvation; the Holy Spirit	Editorial Unilit (December 1996)	Spanish, ISBN 0-7899-0075-0
El Valle De Los Huesos Secos (The Valley of the Dry Bones)	Biblical teachings	Editorial Unilit (December 1996)	Spanish; ISBN 0-7899-0072-6
Perfecto Amor (Perfect Love)	God is love	Editorial Unilit (August 1998)	Spanish, ISBN 0-7899-0070-X

== See also ==
- Billy Graham
- List of Puerto Ricans
