= WIPR (AM) =

- San Juan, Puerto Rico; Puerto Rico
- Broadcast area: Puerto Rico
- Frequency: 940 kHz
- Branding: WIPR 940 AM

Programming
- Format: Talk radio

Ownership
- Owner: Corporación de Puerto Rico para la Difusión Pública; (Puerto Rico Public Broadcasting Corporation)
- Sister stations: WIPR-FM, WIPR-TV, WIPM-TV

History
- First air date: January 26, 1949; 77 years ago
- Call sign meaning: "Wonderful Island of Puerto Rico"

Technical information
- Licensing authority: FCC
- Facility ID: 53861
- Class: B
- Power: 10,000 watts
- Transmitter coordinates: 18°25′36″N 66°58′29″W

Links
- Public license information: Public file; LMS
- Website: www.wipr.pr

WIPR (940 kHz), branded on-air as WIPR 940 AM, is a public, non-commercial AM radio station broadcasting a Talk radio format. Licensed to San Juan, Puerto Rico, the station is owned by the Corporación de Puerto Rico para la Difusión Pública (English: Puerto Rico Public Broadcasting Corporation).

WIPR's audio signal had been simulcast on WIPR-TV channel 6.6 in San Juan & WIPM-TV channel 3.6 in Mayaguez, but was removed on March 20, 2017.

On November 18, 2020, WIPR was granted a construction permit from the Federal Communications Commission (FCC) to move to a new transmitter site and to decrease power to 3,000 watts day and 1,900 watts night but is still broadcasting at 10,000 watts fulltime.

== See also ==
- WIPR-FM
- WIPR-TV
