= WELU =

Television station in Toa Baja, Puerto Rico

- Toa Baja; Puerto Rico
- Channels: Digital: 22 (UHF), shared with WSJN-CD; Virtual: 34
- Branding: CTNi Puerto Rico

Programming
- Affiliations: 34.1: CTN International

Ownership
- Owner: Senda Educational Broadcasting, Inc.
- Operator: Christian Television Network
- Sister stations: WSJN-CD, WQSJ-CD, WVQS-LD, WUSP-LD

History
- Founded: October 14, 1983
- First air date: August 15, 1986 (in Aguadilla; license moved to Toa Baja in 2018)
- Former call signs: WKKU (1983–1986, CP only)
- Former channel numbers: Analog: 32 (UHF, 1986–2009); Digital: 34 (UHF, 2009–2018), 20 (UHF, until 2018); Virtual: 32 (2009–2018)
- Former affiliations: Religious Independent (1986–2014)

Technical information
- Licensing authority: FCC
- Facility ID: 26602
- ERP: 12.7 kW
- HAAT: 317.3 m (1,041 ft)
- Transmitter coordinates: 18°17′30.8″N 66°9′59.6″W

Links
- Public license information: Public file; LMS
- Website: www.sbnnetwork.org; www.ctnonline.com/affiliate/ctni/

WELU (channel 34), branded as CTNi Puerto Rico, is a religious television station licensed to Toa Baja, Puerto Rico. Owned by Senda Educational Broadcasting, the station shares transmitter facilities with WSJN-CD (channel 20) at the Monte Renovados La Peña in Bayamón.

== Technical information ==
=== Subchannels ===
Subchannels of WSJN-CD and WELU
License	Channel	Res.	Short name	Programming
WSJN-CD	8.1	720p	TIVA-TV	Tiva TV
WSJN-CD	20.1	480i	CTNi-DT	CTN International
WSJN-CD	44.1	480i	Q44CK-D	3ABN Latino
WELU	34.1	480i	WELU-DT	CTN International

=== Analog-to-digital conversion ===
On June 12, 2009, WELU signed off analog broadcast and reverting to digital channel.

=== Spectrum reallocation ===
On August 14, 2017, it was revealed that WELU's over-the-air spectrum had been sold in the FCC's spectrum reallocation auction, fetching $375,347. WELU will not sign off, but it will later share broadcast spectrum with WSJN-CD that also covers the entire metropolitan area. Also will change their city of license from Aguadilla to Toa Baja.
