= WUSP-LD =

Television station in Ponce, Puerto Rico

- Ponce; Puerto Rico
- Channels: Digital: 15 (UHF); Virtual: 8, 20, 44, 60
- Branding: CTNi Puerto Rico

Programming
- Affiliations: see § Subchannels

Ownership
- Owner: Senda Educational Broadcasting; (Senda Educational Broadcasting, Inc.)
- Operator: Christian Television Network
- Sister stations: WELU, WQSJ-CD, WSJN-CD, WVQS-LD

History
- First air date: 2014
- Former call signs: W26DU-D (2010–2012)
- Former channel numbers: Digital: 26 (UHF, 2014–2019)
- Former affiliations: Daystar (2014–2021)

Technical information
- Licensing authority: FCC
- Facility ID: 182087
- ERP: 87.0 kW
- Transmitter coordinates: 18°9′15.0″N 66°13′15.0″W

Links
- Public license information: LMS
- Website: www.ctni.org

WUSP-LD (channel 20) is a low-power television station in Ponce, Puerto Rico as an affiliate of CTN International. The station is owned by Senda Educational Broadcasting, a subsidiary of the Christian Television Network. WUSP-LD's transmitter is located in Cerro Maravilla.

== Technical information ==
=== Subchannels ===
The station's digital signal is multiplexed:

Subchannels of WUSP-LD
| Channel | Res. | Short name | Programming |
|---|---|---|---|
| 8.1 | 720p | TIVA-TV | Simulcast of WRUA / Tiva TV |
| 20.1 | 720p | CTNi-DT | Simulcast of WSJN-CD / CTN International |
| 20.2 | 480i | CTN | CTN (4:3) |
| 44.1 | 480i | W44CK-D | Simulcast of W10DD-D / 3ABN Latino (4:3) |
| 60.1 | 480i | FARO TV | Lighthouse TV (4:3) |
