= WKVM =

Radio station in San Juan, Puerto Rico

- San Juan, Puerto Rico; Puerto Rico
- Broadcast area: Puerto Rico
- Frequency: 810 kHz
- Branding: Radio Paz 810

Programming
- Format: Catholic radio

Ownership
- Owner: Grupo RTC; (Radio Paz/WKVM-AM Trust)
- Sister stations: WORO, WORO-DT

History
- First air date: February 1, 1945; 81 years ago (in Arecibo); November 14, 1951; 74 years ago (in San Juan); May 1, 1991; 35 years ago (as a Catholic radio station)
- Former frequencies: 1230 kHz (1945–1947); 1070 kHz (1947–1951)

Technical information
- Licensing authority: FCC
- Facility ID: 8096
- Class: B
- Power: 50,000 watts unlimited
- Transmitter coordinates: 18°21′47″N 66°58′13″W

Links
- Public license information: Public file; LMS
- Website: 810am.bellezamag.com

WKVM (810 AM), branded on-air as Radio Paz 810, is a non-commercial radio station in San Juan, Puerto Rico. The station is owned by Grupo RTC, under its licensee, Radio Paz/WKVM-AM Trust. It airs a mix of Catholic radio programs along with some non-religious shows.

WKVM is powered at 50,000 watts at all times, the only radio station on Puerto Rico with the maximum power day and night. But because 810 AM is a clear channel frequency, WKVM uses a directional antenna at all times to avoid interference.
