= WSJN-CD =

Television station in San Juan, Puerto Rico

- San Juan; Puerto Rico
- Channels: Digital: 22 (UHF), shared with WELU; Virtual: 8, 20, 44, 60
- Branding: CTNi Puerto Rico

Programming
- Affiliations: 20.1: CTN International

Ownership
- Owner: Wanda Rolon
- Operator: Christian Television Network
- Sister stations: WELU, WUSP-LD, WVQS-LD

History
- First air date: 1990
- Former call signs: W15BB (1990–2003); WSJN-CA (2003–2009)
- Former channel numbers: Analog: 15 (UHF, 1990–2009); Digital: 20 (UHF, 2009–2018)
- Former affiliations: Religious Independent (1990–2013)
- Call sign meaning: San Juan

Technical information
- Licensing authority: FCC
- Facility ID: 48239
- Class: CD
- ERP: 12.7 kW
- HAAT: 317.3 m (1,041 ft)
- Transmitter coordinates: 18°17′30.8″N 66°9′59.6″W
- Translator(s): WQSJ-CD 20.1 (Quebradillas)

Links
- Public license information: Public file; LMS
- Website: www.sbnnetwork.org; www.ctnonline.com/affiliate/ctni/

WSJN-CD (channel 20) is a Class A religious television station in San Juan, Puerto Rico. The station is owned by Wanda Rolon and operated by Christian Television Network, along with satellite station WQSJ-CD (channel 20) in Quebradillas, Puerto Rico. WSJN-CD shares transmitter facilities with WELU (channel 34) at the Monte Renovados La Peña in Bayamón. The station has its studios and offices located at Barrio Piñas in Toa Alta.

== History ==
WSJN-CD began operations in 1990, and it was owned by Ministerio Codech en Avance, Inc. Prior to this, WSJN-CD and WQSJ-CD were affiliated with Telecadena SBN between 1999 and 2013. In 2013, the stations switched affiliations to the CTNi network.

== Subchannels ==
Subchannels of WSJN-CD and WELU
License	Subchannel	Res.	Short name	Programming
WSJN-CD	8.1	720p	TIVA-TV	Tiva TV
WSJN-CD	20.1	480i	CTNi-DT	CTN International
WSJN-CD	44.1	480i	Q44CK-D	3ABN Latino
WELU	34.1	480i	WELU-DT	CTN International
