= ABC 5 (American Broadcasting Company affiliates) =

ABC 5 may refer to:

== Current ==
- KECY-DT2 in El Centro, California–Yuma, Arizona (cable channel, broadcasts on channel 9.2)
- KFBB-TV in Great Falls, Montana
- KOCO-TV in Oklahoma City, Oklahoma
- KRGV-TV in Weslaco–Brownsville–McAllen–Harlingen, Texas
- KSTP-TV in St. Paul–Minneapolis, Minnesota
- WCVB-TV in Boston, Massachusetts
- WEWS-TV in Cleveland, Ohio
- WOI-DT in Ames–Des Moines, Iowa
- WORA-TV in Mayagüez, Puerto Rico

== Former ==
- KORN/KXON/KDLT-TV in Sioux Falls, South Dakota (1969–1983)
- WFRV-TV in Green Bay, Wisconsin (1953–1959 and again from 1983 to 1992)
- KCTV in Kansas City, Missouri (1953–1955)
- WRAL-TV in Raleigh–Durham, North Carolina (1957–1985)
- KING-TV in Seattle, Washington (1953–1959)
