= WORO (FM) =

Radio station in Corozal, Puerto Rico

Corozal, Puerto Rico; Puerto Rico
- Broadcast area: San Juan metropolitan area
- Frequency: 92.5 MHz
- Branding: Oro 92.5

Programming
- Format: Easy listening

Ownership
- Owner: Grupo RTC; (Radio ORO/WORO-FM Trust Archdiocese of San Juan)
- Sister stations: WORO-DT, WKVM

History
- First air date: 1968; 58 years ago
- Former call signs: WVVE (1968–1977)
- Call sign meaning: COROzal

Technical information
- Licensing authority: FCC
- Facility ID: 9335
- Class: B
- ERP: 50,000 watts
- HAAT: 855.0 meters (2,805.1 ft)
- Transmitter coordinates: 18°15′59″N 66°19′58″W

Links
- Public license information: Public file; LMS
- Webcast: Listen Live
- Website: empiezatudia.com

WORO (92.5 FM), branded on-air as Oro 92.5, is a radio station that broadcasts in a Spanish-language easy listening radio format. It is owned by the Catholic Church. Licensed to Corozal, Puerto Rico, it serves the central-eastern Puerto Rico area. The station is owned by Grupo RTC, under its licensee Radio ORO/WORO-FM Trust Archdiocese of San Juan.
