= WIDP =

Television station in Guayama, Puerto Rico

- Guayama–San Juan; Puerto Rico
- City: Guayama, Puerto Rico
- Channels: Digital: 34 (UHF); Virtual: 25, 46

Programming
- Subchannels: 25.11: Cielo TV; 46.1: EBN TV, Aliento Visión; 46.2: Triunfo 96.9 FM; 46.3: Bethel TV
- Affiliations: Religious Independent (2005-present)

Ownership
- Owner: Ebenezer Broadcasting Group, Inc.
- Sister stations: WNRT

History
- Founded: January 25, 1990
- First air date: 1997
- Former names: TeleTriunfo (1997–2008)
- Former channel numbers: 46 (analog, 1997–2009); 45 (digital, 2005–2018)
- Former affiliations: TBN Enlace (1997–2005)
- Call sign meaning: Iglesia de Dios Pentecostal

Technical information
- Licensing authority: FCC
- Facility ID: 18410
- ERP: 40.3 kW; 500 kW (STA)
- HAAT: 631 m (2,070 ft)
- Transmitter coordinates: 18°16′37″N 65°51′58″W
- Translator(s): W17EA-D 17 Arroyo

Links
- Public license information: Public file; LMS
- Website: www.ebnpr.tv

WIDP (channel 46) is a Spanish-language religious television station licensed to Guayama, Puerto Rico. Founded January 25, 1990, the station is owned by Ebenezer Broadcasting Group. The station also had an analog on-channel booster, WIDP1 in Las Palmas, Puerto Rico. WIDP's studios are located in Simón Madera Avenue in San Juan with its transmitter at Barrio Cubuy in Canovanas.

In September 2009, WIDP debuted a subchannel named EBN Music, which airs religious music videos 24/7.

== Subchannels ==
Subchannels of WIDP
Channel	Video	Short name	Programming
25.11	720p	WIDP	Cielo TV
46.1	720p	WIDP	EBN TV / Aliento Visión
46.2	720p	WIDP	Triunfo 96.9 FM
46.3	720p	WIDP	Bethel TV

Simulcast of subchannels of another station
