= WIPR-TV =

Television station in San Juan, Puerto Rico

WIPR-TV and WIPM-TV
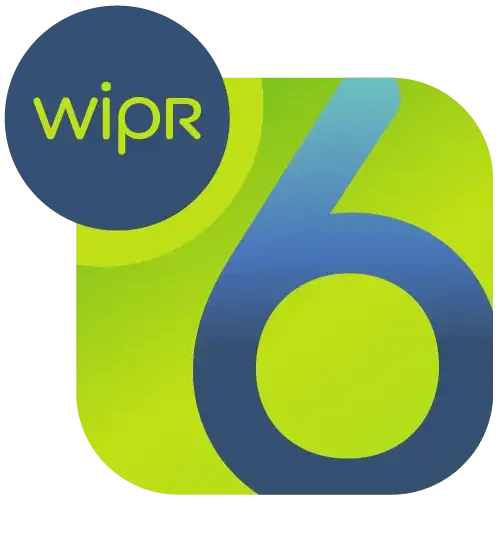

WIPR-TV: San Juan; WIPM-TV: Mayagüez; Puerto Rico
- Channels for WIPR-TV: Digital: 26 (UHF); Virtual: 6
- Channels for WIPM-TV: Digital: 32 (UHF); Virtual: 3
- Branding: WIPR Television (general); Notiséis 360 (newscasts); Kids TV Puerto Rico (6.3/3.3)

Programming
- Affiliations: 6.1/3.1: Educational Independent; 6.3/3.3: Kids TV

Ownership
- Owner: Corporación de Puerto Rico para la Difusión Pública; (Puerto Rico Public Broadcasting Corporation)
- Sister stations: WIPR, WIPR-FM

History
- Founded: WIPR-TV: 1958; WIPM-TV: 1961
- First air date: WIPR-TV: January 6, 1958; WIPM-TV: April 28, 1961
- Former channel number: WIPR-TV: Analog: 6 (VHF, 1958–2009); Digital: 55 (UHF, 2003–2009), 43 (UHF, 2009–2018); WIPM-TV: Analog: 3 (VHF, 1961–2009); Digital: 35 (UHF, 2003–2018)
- Former affiliations: WIPR-TV: NET (1958–1970); PBS (1970–2011, 2022); V-Me (2009–2017); WIPM-TV: NET (1961–1970); PBS (1970–2011, 2022); V-Me (2009–2017)
- Call sign meaning: WIPR-TV: "Wonderful Island of Puerto Rico"; WIPM-TV: WIPR Mayagüez

Technical information
- Licensing authority: FCC
- Facility ID: WIPR-TV: 53859; WIPM-TV: 53863
- ERP: WIPR-TV: 800 kW; 1 kW (DTS); 250 kW (STA); WIPM-TV: 585 kW
- HAAT: WIPR-TV: 841 m (2,759 ft); WIPM-TV: 881 m (2,890 ft)
- Transmitter coordinates: WIPR-TV: 18°6′35″N 66°3′4″W; WIPM-TV: 18°8′53.1″N 66°58′58.6″W
- Translator: WSTE-DT 7.2 Ponce

Links
- Public license information: WIPR-TV: Public file; LMS; WIPM-TV: Public file; LMS
- Website: wipr.pr

WIPR-TV (channel 6) is a non-commercial educational public television station in San Juan, Puerto Rico, owned by the Corporación de Puerto Rico para la Difusión Pública (English: Puerto Rico Public Broadcasting Corporation). Most of the channel's content is local programming. WIPR-TV's studios are located on Hostos Avenue in Hato Rey. Its transmitter is located at Cerro La Santa in Cayey near the Bosque Estatal de Carite mountain reserve.

Much of WIPR's programming is in Spanish, as with most Puerto Rico television stations. The station is branded as WIPR Television. Previously, the station was branded as Teve 6 / Teve 3, TUTV - Tu Universo Televisión, and Puerto Rico TV.

WIPR-TV also operates a semi-satellite on the island's west coast, WIPM-TV (channel 3) in Mayagüez. WIPM-TV's transmitter is located atop Monte del Estado in Maricao.

== History ==
WIPR-TV was created as a result of lobbying for public broadcasting in Puerto Rico, beginning in the 1950s. The station went on the air for the first time on Three Kings Day (January 6), 1958, becoming the first educational television station in Latin America, and the facilities were dedicated in memory of revered Borinquen entertainer Ramón Rivero (Diplo). It was also the first non-commercial station in the Caribbean, and the first to stream on the Internet.

The station was one of the few TV stations in Puerto Rico with English-language programming as part of their PBS membership and also carried PBS Kids programming. This ended on July 1, 2011, after WIPR and PBS failed to reach an agreement to renew the station's membership, with money previously allocated to PBS membership dues being invested in the station's local programming. WMTJ then became the island's only PBS station.

WIPR-TV and WIPM-TV ended regular programming on their analog signals, over VHF channels 6 and 3, on June 12, 2009, the official date on which full-power television stations in the United States transitioned from analog to digital broadcasts under federal mandate. As part of the SAFER Act, WIPR-TV and WIPM-TV kept its analog signal on the air until July 12 to inform viewers of the digital television transition through a loop of public service announcements from the National Association of Broadcasters.

On April 26, 2022, WIPR-TV officially rejoined PBS after ten years as an educational independent station and returned to being Puerto Rico's primary PBS member station.

== Programming ==
WIPR-TV shows local programming as well as PBS programming, including educational, children's, and human interest shows.

=== Notiséis 360 ===
In the 1980s the station had a popular newscast called Panorama Mundial ("World View"), hosted by Doris Torres. In 1995, WIPR launched a newscast branded as Noti-Seis or "News Six". The newscast was first anchored by Pedro Luis García and Gloria Soltero and only had a 6 p.m. edition. Later that year, the station premiered a 9 p.m. edition anchored by the same 6 p.m. team.

In 2002, a new news format was created with a local newscast (TUTV Informa) and an international newscast (TUTV Internacional); the newscasts were anchored by Gloria Soltero and David Reyes. TUTV also produced a weekly in-depth newscast on Sundays, called TUTV Analiza.

TUTV's programming received various awards. Locally, En Todas was awarded by the American Heart Association. Five productions received Emmy Award nominations and one of TUTV's producers received an Emmy in the Entertainment Program category.

On August 31, 2009, when TUTV was rebranded as "Puerto Rico TV", its news department was relaunched as Noticias 24/7; around this time, WIPR introduced a 24-hour news channel of the same name on channels 6.5 and 3.5.

On September 26, 2018, Noticias 24/7 was rebranded as Notiséis 360.

=== List of original programs seen on WIPR-TV ===
- Aquí Estamos with Shanira Blanco
- Estudio Actoral with Dean Zayas
- El Show De Chucho Avellanet
- Noches de Ayer with Tommy Muñiz
- Días de Cine with Edgardo Huertas
- En la Cancha with Tony Lebrón and Jerry González
- Esto lo hago Yo with Douglas Candelario
- Medios Sociales with Yizette Cifredo
- Sábados Sinfonicos
- Notiséis Especial
- Los Más Buscados
- Detrás del Fotógrafo
- Alianza al Día
- Música para Tus Oidos with Hermes Croatto
- Animaleando with Nynah
- Te Cuento lo que Leí
- Prohibido Olvidar
- Al Máximo con Geraldine
- Agenda Puerto Rico
- Impulso del Oeste
- En La Punta de la Lengua
- Travesías con Sabor
- Prohibido Olvidar

== Technical information ==
=== Subchannels ===
The stations' signals are multiplexed:

Subchannels of WIPR-TV and WIPM-TV
Channel		Res.	Short name		Programming
WIPR-TV	WIPM-TV	Res.	WIPR-TV	WIPM-TV	Programming
6.1	3.1	1080i	WIPR-HD	WIPM-HD	Main WIPR-TV programming
6.2	3.2	480i	WIPR-D2	WIPM-D2	WIPR 940AM (Audio only)
6.3	3.3	720p	KIDS HD		Kids TV Puerto Rico

=== Digital and high definition ===
WIPR-TV, the island's first public television station, also became the first in the evolution to digital and high definition.

On July 7, 2008, President Víctor J. Montilla (now, Executive VP & general manager of New Channels at WORA-TV) held a press conference at the station, where he inaugurated WIPR-TV's high-definition facilities. TUTV became the first station in Puerto Rico to produce and broadcast in high-definition format. The station upgraded its lighting and built new sets as part of the transition. The first program to be transmitted in this format was Contigo.

== See also ==
- WIPR (AM)
- WIPR-FM
