= WNRT =

Christian radio station in Manatí, Puerto Rico

- Manatí, Puerto Rico; Puerto Rico
- Broadcast area: San Juan, Puerto Rico
- Frequency: 96.9 MHz
- Branding: Triunfo 96.9 FM

Programming
- Format: Contemporary Christian

Ownership
- Owner: Arecibo Broadcasting Corporation; (La Voz Evangélica de Puerto Rico, Inc.)
- Sister stations: WIDP Former: WMNT (AM) until 1986

History
- First air date: August 24, 1967; 58 years ago
- Former call signs: WMNT-FM (1967–1971, CP); WMLD-FM (1971–1985)
- Call sign meaning: TR iu N fo backward

Technical information
- Licensing authority: FCC
- Facility ID: 36195
- Class: B
- ERP: 50,000 watts
- HAAT: 873.0 meters (2,864.2 ft)
- Transmitter coordinates: 18°15′41″N 66°32′16″W

Links
- Public license information: Public file; LMS
- Website: triunfo969.fm

WNRT (96.9 FM), branded on-air as Triunfo 96.9 FM, is a radio station broadcasting a Contemporary Christian format. Licensed to Manatí, Puerto Rico, it serves the northern Puerto Rico area. and it is currently owned by Arecibo Broadcasting Corporation.

The station is relayed through booster stations, WNRT-FM1 in Caguas and WNRT-FM2 in Mayagüez, both operating at 96.9 FM.

== History ==
WNRT-FM was founded in 1971 by Mr. Pedro Collazo Barbosa and Mr. Efrain Archilla Roig under the call sign WMLD-FM and the branding name "Radio Melodia". On June 20, 1967, a construction permit was applied by the Arecibo Broadcasting Corporation, Inc. for a new FM broadcast station to be operated on the 96.9mc frequency with 18.25kW power. On April 15, 1968 it was granted and on August 24, 1971 it was officially inaugurated. In 1982, WMLD-FM then known as "Ritmo 97" was acquired along with its sister station WMNT-AM, then known as "Radio Atenas 1500 AM" by La Voz Evangelica de Puerto Rico, Inc. WMLD-FM immediately became "Radio Triunfo" and WMNT-AM became "Radio Aleluya", both with a Christian format. On May 18, 1986, La Voz Evangelica de Puerto Rico, Inc., returned WMNT-AM to Mr. Pedro Collazo, who changed its brand name again to "Radio Atenas 1500 AM" and its programming to its old format, while WMLD-FM remained owned by La Voz Evangélica de Puerto Rico, Inc. and changed its call sign to WNRT-FM. Actually "Triunfo 96.9 FM" is one of the Christian stations with greatest coverage on the island and its programming mixes music and talk shows with Christian messages.
