= Quasi-synchronous transmission =

In radio broadcasting, quasi-synchronous transmission is a method of achieving wider area coverage using multiple transmitters but without needing multiple frequencies. It became technically feasible in the mid 1970s, but was rapidly superseded by cellular networks in the early 1980s, so it is rarely found today. It was invented by engineer J. T. Murasko of UK radiotelephone manufacturer Dymar Electronics.

The principle of operation is to precisely control the transmission frequency so accurately that interference between adjacent transmitters is kept under control, with a beat frequency of about 10-15 hertz only. While this creates some audible affects in the receiver in the overlap region, it is usually tolerable and doesn't affect the intelligibility of the signal. Narrowband Frequency modulation is used exclusively, so that the capture effect will select the stronger of two transmitters wherever one predominates. While frequency control down to 1-2 hertz accuracy is achievable, this is undesirable, since the cancellation of signals would wipe out the signal at the receiver for up to a second. The deliberate offset prevents this at the expense of a "motorboating" effect.

Transmitters use highly stable crystal ovens as their primary oscillator and frequency synthesisers to generate multiple channels from this.
