= WRFB =

Television station in Carolina, Puerto Rico

Satellite of WORA-TV, Mayagüez, Puerto Rico

- Carolina–San Juan; Puerto Rico
- City: Carolina, Puerto Rico
- Channels: Digital: 30 (UHF); Virtual: 5
- Branding: WORA 5 / ABC Puerto Rico (general); ABC News Extra (newscasts)

Programming
- Affiliations: 5.1: ABC; for others, see § Subchannels

Ownership
- Owner: Telecinco Media Holdings; (Telecinco, Inc.)
- Sister stations: WORA-TV

History
- Founded: October 2, 1989
- First air date: 1997
- Former call signs: WDZE (1997–1998); WZDE (1998–2001)
- Former channel numbers: Analog: 52 (UHF, 1997–2009); Digital: 51 (UHF, 2009–2017); Virtual: 51 (2009–2019)
- Former affiliations: Independent (1997–2016); DestinoTV (2013); Telemicro Internacional (2013–2014); Silent (2014, 2016, 2017–2019); SuperCanal (2016–2017); Telemundo (2019); ABC (5.2, 2019)
- Call sign meaning: R&F Broadcasting (former owner)

Technical information
- Licensing authority: FCC
- Facility ID: 54443
- ERP: 250 kW; 40 kW (STA)
- HAAT: 305.8 m (1,003 ft)
- Transmitter coordinates: 18°16′26.06″N 66°5′40.41″W
- Translator(s): W05DA-D Fajardo; W05DB-D Ponce; W29EE-D San Lorenzo

Links
- Public license information: Public file; LMS
- Website: www.abc.pr

WRFB (channel 5), branded ABC Puerto Rico, is a television station licensed to Carolina, serving the San Juan area as an affiliate of ABC. It is a full-time satellite of Mayagüez-licensed WORA-TV (channel 5) which is owned by Telecinco Media Holdings. WRFB's transmitter is located on Cerro Marquesa in Aguas Buenas; its parent station maintains studios on Ponce de León Avenue in Santurce, with additional studios at the Guanajibo Building on Calle Clemente in Mayagüez.

== Sale to Telecinco ==
On June 15, 2017, WRFB sold for over $600,000 to Telecinco, Inc. through subsidiary ERA International Corporation, and after the transaction with a $30,000 deposit had been made by the buyer, this became a sister station of WORA-TV in Mayagüez. WRFB was to be used to bring ABC network programming as a satellite of WORA-DT2, and TVE programming from VIVE/WORA-DT3, expanding the coverage area. The sale of WRFB to Telecinco was completed on October 22, 2017.

Due to the passage of Hurricane Maria, WRFB went off the air on September 20. WRFB returned to the air for a brief period of testing, then went silent once again on August 19, 2018. After months off the air, the station returned to the air on February 22, 2019, as a repeater for WORA-TV and switched its virtual channel position from channel 51 to channel 5.

== Technical information ==
=== Subchannels ===
Subchannels of WORA-TV, WRFB and repeaters
Channel			Res.	Aspect	Short name	Programming
WORA-TV; WRFB	W05CY-D	W10BG-D	Res.	Aspect	Short name	Programming
5.1	5.5	10.1	720p	16:9	ABC-PR	ABC
5.2	5.6	10.2	720p	16:9	UIA-TV	Inter Online TV
5.3	5.7	10.3	480i	16:9	VIVE	VIVE Television / 24h
5.4	5.8	10.4	720p	16:9	Tele5.4	Telecinco / Camarero TV

=== Analog-to-digital conversion ===
On June 12, 2009, WRFB signed off its analog signal and completed its move to digital.
