= Revista Jurídica de la Universidad de Puerto Rico =

University of Puerto Rico Law Journal

- Language: English

Standard abbreviations
- Bluebook: Rev. Jur. U.P.R.
- ISO 4: Rev. Juríd. Univ. P. R.

Indexing
- ISSN: 0886-2516
- OCLC no.: 01763967

Links
- Journal homepage

Revista Jurídica de la Universidad de Puerto Rico (University of Puerto Rico Law Journal) was established in March 1932 by Manuel Rodríguez Ramos and Manuel García Cabrera, and later Eulogio Riera and Gilberto Concepción de Gracia.
