= WRRE =

Radio station in Juncos, Puerto Rico

- Juncos, Puerto Rico; Puerto Rico
- Frequency: 1460 kHz
- Branding: Maranatha Radio Ministries

Programming
- Format: Religious

Ownership
- Owner: Héctor Delgado; (Maranatha Radio Ministries)

History
- First air date: February 16, 1972
- Former call signs: WCID (1971-1977); WFAB (1977-1989)
- Call sign meaning: Radio Redentor Este

Technical information
- Licensing authority: FCC
- Facility ID: 54564
- Class: B
- Power: 1,500 watts day 2,750 watts night
- Transmitter coordinates: 18°12′54″N 65°54′33″W

Links
- Public license information: Public file; LMS
- Website: maranatharadioministries.com

WRRE (1460 AM) is a Religious radio station licensed in Juncos, Puerto Rico, the station serves the Puerto Rico area. The station is owned by Héctor Delgado, through licensee Maranatha Radio Ministries. Héctor Delgado, known as Héctor el Father, former Puerto Rican singer of reggaeton and is considered one of the most prominent singers in the history of reggaetón, winner of important awards such as the Billboard. In 2008 he retired from the genre. WRRE is part of the Maranatha Radio Ministries Network.

The station was assigned the WRRE call letters by the Federal Communications Commission on July 15, 1989.

== History ==
In the beginning of the 1960s, the planning and construction of a powerful radio station on the 1460 AM frequency near the city of Juncos that covered the entire island of Puerto Rico with its sister station WFBA in San Sebastian (covering the northwest area On the same frequency, now WLRP). In 1971 it was called Radio Cid (WCID), then in 1977 changed its name to WFAB "La Fabulosa de Juncos". During the 1980s and 1990s, the station changed to a Christian format under the names of Radio Maranatha, then WRRE "Radio Redentor del Este", "Radio Emanuel", "Radio Viva" and "Sonido Santidad".

From October 7, 2015, Héctor Delgado acquires and relaunches WRRE, in a format of Religious Ministry, and with this new format WRRE will initiate its new brand, known as "Maranatha Radio Ministries" simultaneously transmitting through its YouTube Channel, APP, Web Page, Facebook Live and Internet Television. The Internet application (APP) of Maranatha Radio Ministries WRRE 1460 AM reached in the first 6 months the number of more than 50,000 installations in the Google Play Store, an unprecedented number in the Christian radio stations in Puerto Rico. In his most popular program of the morning called "Un Nuevo Despertar", Héctor Delgado also participates with singer Julio Ramos, formerly known as "Julio Voltio". A station born in the heart of God to supply your need, is its slogan. WRRE now issues under the direction of Héctor Delgado (President) and Ángel Figueroa (General Manager).
