= WIMN-CD =

Television station in Arecibo, Puerto Rico

- Arecibo; Puerto Rico
- Channels: Digital: 36 (UHF); Virtual: 8.2, 37, 77, 99
- Branding: Paradise Network

Programming
- Affiliations: see § Subchannels

Ownership
- Owner: Paradise Network, Inc.; (Estate of Carmen Cabrera)

History
- Former call signs: W28AH (1987-2001); W20BX (2001-2003); WIMN-CA (2003-2015)
- Former channel numbers: Analog: 28 (UHF, 1987–2001); 20 (UHF, 2001–2013); Virtual: 36 (2013–2021)
- Former affiliations: Channel America (1987–1996); Independent (1996–2001); Religious Independent (2001–2014); JLTV (2014–2023)

Technical information
- Licensing authority: FCC
- ERP: 1,000 kW
- HAAT: 565 m (1,854 ft)

Links
- Public license information: Public file; LMS
- Website: www.paradisenetwork.tv www.dnj.tv www.caribbeanadvantage.com

WIMN-CD (channel 37) is a Class A Independent television station licensed to Arecibo, Puerto Rico. The station is owned by Paradise Network, Inc., and its studios are located next to Arecibo Mall.

== History ==
At the beginning in 1987, WIMN used to broadcast music videos, music specials and local news about Arecibo and the Northern Region, but then became part of Channel America. In 2001, WIMN-CA started broadcasting religious programming, now under the management of Carmen Cabrera, and was branded as Mega TV. In 2013, months after switching its digital signal, WIMN-CA joined JLTV. As of September 28, 2014, WIMN-CA changed its branding to JLTV Puerto Rico. On June 6, 2015, the station was licensed for digital operation and changed its call sign to WIMN-CD. On September 20, 2017, WIMN-CD was forced to go off the air due to the passage of Hurricane Maria. Since October 1, 2018, WIMN-CD returned to the air from its new transmitter and reverted its branding to Israel TV. On September 15, 2023, the station changed their virtual channels to 8.1, 37.1 and 99.9. On October 1, 2023, WIMN-CD changed its branding to Paradise Network and features local programming including some programs from Tiva TV and Radio Once. The station also broadcast tourism information for Puerto Rican residents.

== Subchannels ==
Subchannels of WIMN-CD
Channel	Res.	Short name	Programming
8.2	720p	TIVA TV	Translator of WRUA / Tiva TV
37.1	1080i	WIMN-TV	Paradise Network
77.1	1080i	WIMN	DNJ TV
99.9	720p	CATV	Caribbean Advantage TV

== Logos ==
Former logo used as channel 20 until 2015.
