= WVQS-LD =

Television station in Vieques, Puerto Rico

Translator of WSJN-CD, San Juan, Puerto Rico
- Vieques; Puerto Rico
- Channels: Digital: 14 (UHF); Virtual: 8, 20, 34, 44, 60
- Branding: CTNi Puerto Rico

Programming
- Affiliations: 8.1: Tiva TV; 20.1: CTN International; 20.2: CTN; 34.1: CTN International; 44.1: 3ABN Latino; 60.1: Lighthouse TV

Ownership
- Owner: Senda Educational Broadcasting; (Senda Educational Broadcasting, Inc.)
- Operator: Christian Television Network
- Sister stations: WELU, WQSJ-CD, WSJN-CD, WUSP-LD

History
- Founded: 1990
- Former call signs: W28BA (1990–2003); WVQS-LP (2003–2011)
- Former channel numbers: Analog: 28 (1990–2007), 50 (2007–2011); Digital: 50 (UHF, 2011–2019); Virtual: 50 (2011–2019)
- Former affiliations: Independent (2003–2011); The Retro Channel (2011–2012, 2014–2015); TeLe-Romantica (2012–2013); Telemicro Internacional (2013–2014)
- Call sign meaning: Vieques

Technical information
- Licensing authority: FCC
- Facility ID: 32144
- Class: LD
- ERP: 560 kW
- HAAT: 657 m (2,156 ft)

Links
- Public license information: LMS
- Website: www.sbnnetwork.org www.ctni.org

WVQS-LD (channel 20) is a television station licensed to Vieques, Puerto Rico. The station is owned and operated by Senda Educational Broadcasting, a subsidiary of Christian Television Network.

On April 15, 2015, WVQS-LD changed its affiliation with CTN International on channel 50.1 & CTN on channel 50.2, rebroadcasting WSJN-CD.

Its sister station is WUSP-LD 251 in Ponce (a CTN International affiliate). This station is also owned by Senda Educational Broadcasting, Inc.

== Digital Television ==
WVQS-LD's digital signal is multiplexed:

Channel	Video	Short name	Programming
8.1	720p	TIVA-TV	Tiva TV
20.1	720p	CTNi-DT	CTN International
20.2	480i	CTN	CTN
34.1	480i	WELU-DT	CTN International
44.1	480i	W44CK-D	3ABN Latino
60.1	480i	FARO TV	Lighthouse TV
