= WOLE-DT =

Television station in Aguadilla, Puerto Rico

Satellite of WLII-DT, Caguas–San Juan, Puerto Rico
- Aguadilla–Mayagüez; Puerto Rico
- City: Aguadilla, Puerto Rico
- Channels: Digital: 12 (VHF); Virtual: 12
- Branding: TeleOnce (general); Las Noticias (newscasts)

Programming
- Affiliations: 12.1: TeleOnce; 12.2: Noticias 24/7

Ownership
- Owner: Liberman Media Group LLC
- Sister stations: WLII-DT

History
- First air date: May 10, 1960 (Note: The Broadcasting and Cable Yearbook says May 13, while the Television and Cable Factbook says May 10.)
- Former call signs: WOLE-TV (1960–2009)
- Former channel numbers: Analog: 12 (VHF, 1960–2009)
- Former affiliations: Repeater for WAPA-TV (1960–1979, 1984–1994); Repeater for WKAQ-TV (1979–1984, 1995–2014); Univision (2014–2025)
- Call sign meaning: ¡Olé!, a Spanish expression of enthusiasm or affirmation

Technical information
- Licensing authority: FCC
- Facility ID: 71725
- ERP: 47.5 kW; 275 kW (STA); 120 kW (CP)
- HAAT: 661 m (2,169 ft)
- Transmitter coordinates: 18°8′56″N 66°59′20″W
- Translator(s): W21CX-D (UHF) Mayagüez

Links
- Public license information: Public file; LMS
- Website: TeleOnce

WOLE-DT (channel 12) is a Spanish-language independent television station licensed to Aguadilla, Puerto Rico, serving Mayagüez and the western part of the island. It is a full-time satellite of San Juan–based WLII-DT (channel 11, licensed to Caguas), owned by Liberman Media Group. WOLE-DT's sales office is located in the Westernbank Building in downtown Mayagüez, and its transmitter is located at Monte del Estado in Maricao. Its parent station maintains studios on Calle Carazo in Guaynabo and has additional studios in Barrio Palmar in Aguadilla.

WOLE-DT operates a translator, W21CX-D (channel 21), licensed to Mayagüez.

== History ==
WOLE-TV started broadcasting on May 10, 1960, as the second television station on Puerto Rico's west coast. The station was owned by Western Broadcasting Corporation of Puerto Rico, and served as a repeater for WAPA-TV from 1960 to 1979 and again from 1984 to 1994. During its early years, the station produced its own programming, but its schedule eventually shifted toward infomercials, possibly due to the lack of interest from local businesses in advertising on television. In 1979, the station entered a new affiliation agreement with WKAQ-TV (Telemundo) until 1984 and again from January 1, 1995, until December 31, 2014.

On October 15, 2014, Univision Communications announced that WOLE-DT would become a semi-satellite of then Univision station WLII-DT (now Teleonce). The programming change occurred on January 1, 2015. With the move, WOLE dropped all programming from WKAQ-TV and Telemundo, which quickly entered into negotiations with WLII's existing western Puerto Rico satellite, WORA-TV (channel 5).

On July 22, 2018, Univision Communications announced that it had purchased retransmission partner WOLE-DT from Western Broadcasting Corp. of Puerto Rico for $3,666,666.64, solidifying its Puerto Rico station line up. The sale was completed on December 5, 2018.

On February 25, 2020, investment firms ForgeLight (launched by founder & CEO & ex-Viacom CFO Wade Davis) and Searchlight Capital agreed to acquire the 64% controlling stake of Univision Communications which owned WLII-DT, while minority owner Televisa continued to hold its 36% stake with the company. However, both Searchlight and ForgeLight had a stake in Hemisphere Media Group, which owns WAPA-TV in San Juan (which also operates WNJX-TV, a repeater in the same area WOLE-DT operates). Because of this, Univision was required to divest WLII and its satellite stations (including WOLE-DT) in order to comply with ownership limits.

On August 27, 2020, Univision announced that WLII and its satellite stations (WOLE-DT and WSUR-DT) would be acquired by Liberman Media Group for $1 million each. The sale was completed on December 10, 2020. Univision retained WSTE-DT, WKAQ-AM and WKAQ-FM. It was also reported that WLII would bring back the TeleOnce branding, which the station used for 15 years from 1986 to 2002. On January 19, 2021, Liberman Media Group named Winter Horton as the new general manager for the station. WLII-DT (and its repeaters) aired as Univision Puerto Rico until February 18, 2021, when the on screen branding switched to TeleOnce at 8 p.m.

In December 2025, TeleOnce announced that its affiliation contract with Univision would expire on December 31, with the station going independent the following day after 23 years as the island's Univision affiliate.

== News operation ==
WOLE-DT formerly produced a local news operation called Edición Puerto Rico, similar to WKAQ-TV and WAPA-TV's news offerings. Aired weekdays at 5:30 p.m. and 10 p.m., the newscast concentrates on events happening in and around Puerto Rico, and interacts with others through social media platforms. The program was also aired on WLII, Facebook Live and the station's website. Currently, WOLE-DT produces news segments for Las Noticias TeleOnce, titled Las Noticias en el Oeste and seen across Puerto Rico.

== Subchannels ==
The station's signal is multiplexed:

Subchannels of WOLE-DT
Channel	Res.	Short name	Programming
12.1	1080i	WOLE-DT	Teleonce
12.2	720p	WOLE-DT	Noticias 24/7

== Logos ==
WOLE's logo from 2015 to 2018.

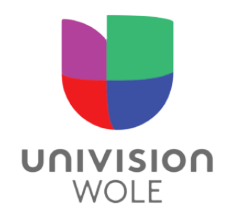
WOLE's logo from 2019 to 2021.

WOLE's logo from 2021 to Present
