= Broadcast transmitter =

Radio broadcast hardware

A broadcast transmitter is an electronic device that radiates radio waves modulated with information content intended to be received by the general public. Examples are a radio broadcasting transmitter which transmits audio (sound) to broadcast radio receivers (radios) owned by the public, or a television transmitter, which transmits moving images (video) to television receivers (televisions). The term often includes the antenna which radiates the radio waves, and the building and facilities associated with the transmitter. A broadcasting station (radio station or television station) consists of a broadcast transmitter along with the production studio which originates the broadcasts. Broadcast transmitters must be licensed by governments, and are restricted to specific frequencies and power levels. Each transmitter is assigned a unique identifier consisting of a string of letters and numbers called a callsign, which must be used in all broadcasts.

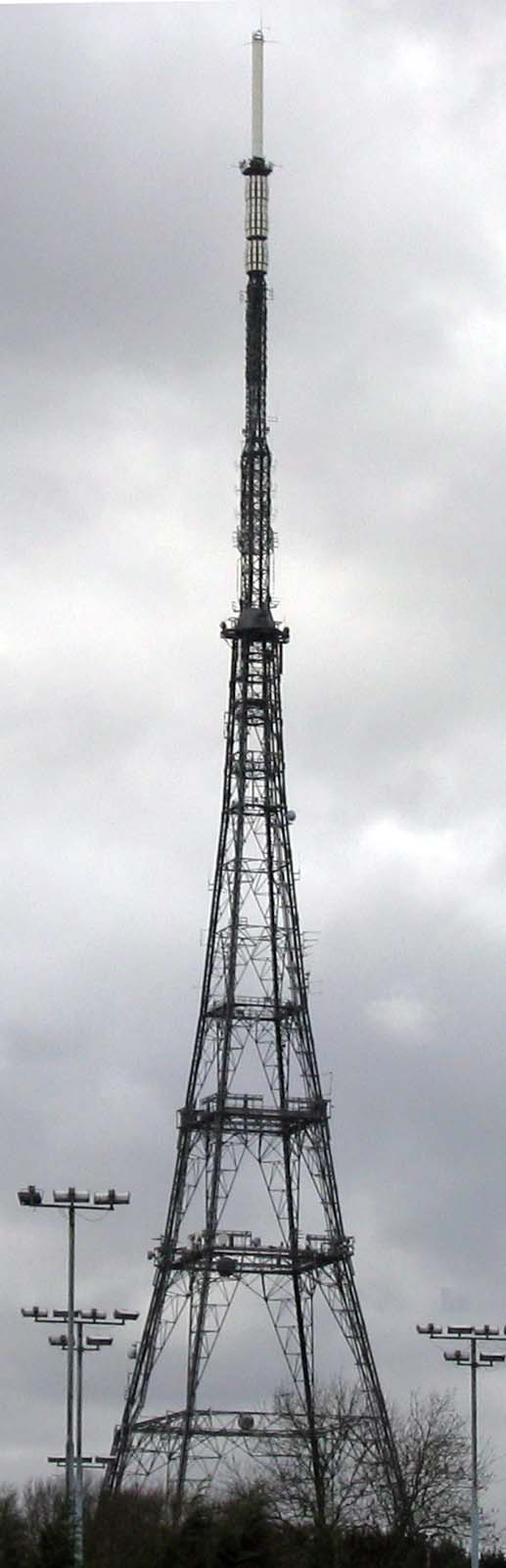
Antenna tower of Crystal Palace transmitter, London

== Exciter ==
In broadcasting and telecommunication, the part which contains the oscillator, modulator, and sometimes audio processor, is called the "exciter". Most transmitters use the heterodyne principle, so they also have frequency conversion units. Confusingly, the high-power amplifier, which the exciter then feeds into is often called the "transmitter" by broadcast engineers. The final output is given as transmitter power output (TPO), although this is not what most stations are rated by.

Effective radiated power (ERP) is used when calculating station coverage, even for most non-broadcast stations. It is the TPO, minus any attenuation or radiated loss in the line to the antenna, multiplied by the gain (magnification), which the antenna provides toward the horizon. This antenna gain is important, because achieving a desired signal strength without it would result in an enormous electric utility bill for the transmitter, and a prohibitively expensive transmitter. For most large stations in the VHF- and UHF-range, the transmitter power is no more than 20% of the ERP.

For VLF, LF, MF and HF the ERP is typically not determined separately. In most cases the transmission power found in lists of transmitters is the value for the output of the transmitter. This is only correct for omnidirectional aerials with a length of a quarter wavelength or shorter. For other aerial types there are gain factors, which can reach values until 50 for shortwave directional beams in the direction of maximum beam intensity.

Since some authors take account of gain factors of aerials of transmitters for frequencies below 30 MHz and others not, there are often discrepancies of the values of transmitted powers.

== Power supply ==
Transmitters are sometimes fed from a higher voltage level of the power supply grid than necessary in order to improve security of supply. For example, the Allouis, Konstantynow, and Roumoules transmitters are fed from the high-voltage network (110 kV in Alouis and Konstantynow, 150 kV in Roumoules) even though a power supply from the medium-voltage level of the power grid (about 20 kV) would be able to deliver enough power.

== Cooling of final stages ==
Low-power transmitters do not require special cooling equipment. Modern transmitters can be incredibly efficient, with efficiencies exceeding 98 percent. However, a broadcast transmitter with a megawatt power stage transferring 98% of that into the antenna can also be viewed as a 20 kilowatt electric heater.

For medium-power transmitters up to several tens of kilowatts, including 50 kW AM and 20 kW FM, forced air cooling is generally used. At power levels above these some transmitters have the output stage cooled by a forced liquid cooling system analogous to an automobile cooling system. Since the coolant directly touches the high-voltage anodes of the tubes, only distilled, deionised water or a special dielectric coolant can be used in the cooling circuit. This high-purity coolant is in turn cooled by a heat exchanger, where the second cooling circuit can use water of ordinary quality because it is not in contact with energized parts. Very high-power tubes of small physical size may use evaporative or vapor cooling by water in contact with the anode. The production of steam allows a high heat flow in a small space.

== Protection equipment ==
The high voltages used in high power transmitters (up to 40 kV) require extensive protection equipment. Also, transmitters are exposed to damage from lightning. Transmitters may be damaged if operated without an antenna, so protection circuits must detect the loss of the antenna and switch off the transmitter immediately. Tube-based transmitters must have power applied in the proper sequence, with the filament voltage applied before the anode voltage, otherwise the tubes can be damaged. The output stage must be monitored for standing waves, which indicate that generated power is not being radiated but instead is being reflected back into the transmitter.

Lightning protection is required between the transmitter and antenna. This consists of spark gaps and gas-filled surge arresters to limit the voltage that appears on the transmitter terminals. The control instrument that measures the voltage standing-wave ratio switches the transmitter off briefly if a higher voltage standing-wave ratio is detected after a lightning strike, as the reflections are probably due to lightning damage. If this does not succeed after several attempts, the antenna may be damaged and the transmitter should remain switched off. In some transmitting plants UV detectors are fitted in critical places, to switch off the transmitter if an arc is detected. The operating voltages, modulation factor, frequency and other transmitter parameters are monitored for protection and diagnostic purposes, and may be displayed locally and/or at a remote control room.

== Building ==
A commercial transmitter site will usually have a control building to shelter the transmitter components and control devices. This is usually a purely functional building, which may contain apparatus for both radio and television transmitters. To reduce transmission line loss the transmitter building is usually immediately adjacent to the antenna for VHF and UHF sites, but for lower frequencies it may be desirable to have a distance of a few score or several hundred metres between the building and the antenna. Some transmitting towers have enclosures built into the tower to house radio relay link transmitters or other, relatively low-power transmitters. A few transmitter buildings may include limited broadcasting facilities to allow a station to use the building as a backup studio in case of incapacitation of the main facility.

== Legal and regulatory aspects ==
Since radio waves go over borders, international agreements control radio transmissions. In European countries like Germany, often the national Post Office is the regulating authority. In the United States, broadcast and industrial transmitters are regulated by the Federal Communications Commission (FCC). In Canada, technical aspects of broadcast and radio transmitters are controlled by Industry Canada, but broadcast content is regulated separately by the Canadian Radio-television and Telecommunications Commission (CRTC). In Australia transmitters, spectrum, and content are controlled by the Australian Communications and Media Authority (ACMA). The International Telecommunication Union (ITU) helps managing the radio-frequency spectrum internationally.

== Planning ==
As in any costly project, the planning of a high power transmitter site requires great care. This begins with the location. A minimum distance, which depends on the transmitter frequency, transmitter power, and the design of the transmitting antennas, is required to protect people from the radio frequency energy. Antenna towers are often very tall and therefore flight paths must be evaluated. Sufficient electric power must be available for high power transmitters. Transmitters for long and medium wave require good grounding and soil of high electrical conductivity. Locations at the sea or in river valleys are ideal, but the flood danger must be considered. Transmitters for UHF are best on high mountains to improve the range (see radio propagation). The antenna pattern must be considered because it is costly to change the pattern of a long-wave or medium-wave antenna.

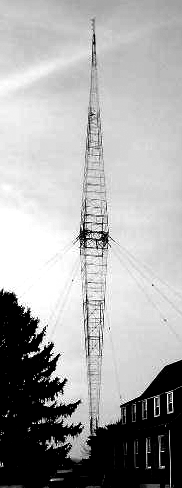
Antenna guyed tower

Transmitting antennas for long and medium wave are usually implemented as a mast radiator. Similar antennas with smaller dimensions are used also for short wave transmitters, if these send in the round spray enterprise. For arranging radiation at free standing steel towers fastened planar arrays are used. Radio towers for UHF and TV transmitters can be implemented in principle as grounded constructions. Towers may be steel lattice masts or reinforced concrete towers with antennas mounted at the top. Some transmitting towers for UHF have high-altitude operating rooms and/or facilities such as restaurants and observation platforms, which are accessible by elevator. Such towers are usually called TV tower. For microwaves one frequently uses parabolic antennas. These can be set up for applications of radio relay links on transmitting towers for FM to special platforms. For example, large parabolic antennas ranging from 3 to 100 meters in diameter are necessary to pass on signals to television satellites and space vehicles. These plants, which can be used if necessary also as radio telescope, are established on free standing constructions, whereby there are also numerous special designs, like the radio telescope in Arecibo.

Just as important as the planning of the construction and location of the transmitter is how its output fits in with existing transmissions. Two transmitters cannot broadcast on the same frequency in the same area as this would cause co-channel interference. The other two groups (B and C/D) utilise the middle and top third of the band. By replicating this grouping across the country (using different groups for adjacent transmitters), co-channel interference can be minimised, and in addition, those in marginal reception areas can use more efficient grouped receiving antennas. Unfortunately, in the UK, this carefully planned system has had to be compromised with the advent of digital broadcasting which (during the changeover period at least) requires yet more channel space, and consequently the additional digital broadcast channels cannot always be fitted within the transmitter's existing group. Thus many UK transmitters have become "wideband" with the consequent need for replacement of receiving antennas (see external links). Once the Digital Switch Over (DSO) occurs the plan is that most transmitters will revert to their original groups, source Ofcom July 2007.

Further complication arises when adjacent transmitters have to transmit on the same frequency and under these circumstances the broadcast radiation patterns are attenuated in the relevant direction(s). A good example of this is in the United Kingdom, where the Waltham transmitting station broadcasts at high power on the same frequencies as the Sandy Heath transmitting station's high power transmissions, with the two being only 50 miles apart. Thus Waltham's antenna array does not broadcast these two channels in the direction of Sandy Heath and vice versa.

Where a particular service needs to have wide coverage, this is usually achieved by using multiple transmitters at different locations. Usually, these transmitters will operate at different frequencies to avoid interference where coverage overlaps. Examples include national broadcasting networks and cellular networks. In the latter, frequency switching is automatically done by the receiver as necessary, in the former, manual retuning is more common (though the Radio Data System is an example of automatic frequency switching in broadcast networks). Another system for extending coverage using multiple transmitters is quasi-synchronous transmission, but this is rarely used nowadays.

== Main and relay (repeater) transmitters ==
Transmitting stations are usually either classified as main stations or relay stations (also known as repeaters, translators or sometimes "transposers").

Main stations are defined as those that generate their own modulated output signal from a baseband (unmodulated) input. Usually main stations operate at high power and cover large areas.

Relay stations (translators) take an already modulated input signal, usually by direct reception of a parent station off the air, and simply rebroadcast it on another frequency. Usually relay stations operate at medium or low power, and are used to fill in pockets of poor reception within, or at the fringe of, the service area of a parent main station.

Note that a main station may also take its input signal directly off-air from another station, however this signal would be fully demodulated to baseband first, processed, and then remodulated for transmission.

== Transmitters in culture ==
Some cities in Europe, like Mühlacker, Ismaning, Langenberg, Kalundborg, Hörby and Allouis became famous as sites of powerful transmitters. For example, Goliath transmitter was a VLF transmitter of Nazi Germany's Kriegsmarine during World War II located near Kalbe an der Milde in Saxony-Anhalt, Germany. Some transmitting towers like the radio tower Berlin or the TV tower Stuttgart have become landmarks of cities. Many transmitting plants have very high radio towers that are masterpieces of engineering.

Having the tallest building in the world, the nation, the state/province/prefecture, city, etc., has often been considered something to brag about. Often, builders of high-rise buildings have used transmitter antennas to lay claim to having the tallest building. A historic example was the "tallest building" feud between the Chrysler Building and the Empire State Building in New York, New York.

Some towers have an observation deck accessible to tourists. An example is the Ostankino Tower in Moscow, which was completed in 1967 on the 50th anniversary of the October Revolution to demonstrate the technical abilities of the Soviet Union. As very tall radio towers of any construction type are prominent landmarks, requiring careful planning and construction, and high-power transmitters especially in the long- and medium-wave ranges can be received over long distances, such facilities were often mentioned in propaganda. Other examples were the Deutschlandsender Herzberg/Elster and the Warsaw Radio Mast.

KVLY-TV's tower located near Blanchard, North Dakota was the tallest artificial structure in the world when it was completed in 1963. It was surpassed in 1974 by the Warszawa radio mast, but regained its title when the latter collapsed in 1991. It was surpassed by the Burj Khalifa skyscraper in early 2009, but the KVLY-TV mast is still the tallest transmitter.

== Records ==
- Tallest radio/television mast:
  - 1974–1991: Konstantynow for 2000 kW longwave transmitter, 646.38 m (2120 ft 8 in)
  - 1963–1974 and since 1991: KVLY Tower, 2,063 ft (628.8 m)
- Highest power:
  - Longwave, Taldom transmitter, 2500 kW
  - Medium wave, Bolshakovo transmitter, 2500 kW
- Highest transmission sites (Europe):
  - FM Pic du Aigu in Chamonix
  - MW Pic Blanc in Andorra
- Highest transmission sites (North America):
  - KMXD FM on Tushar Mountains

== See also ==
- List of famous transmission sites
- Radio transmitter design
- Transmitter station
- TV transmitter
- Transposer
