= WRUA =

Television station in Fajardo, Puerto Rico

- Fajardo–San Juan; Puerto Rico
- City: Fajardo, Puerto Rico
- Channels: Digital: 16 (UHF); Virtual: 8, 64
- Branding: Tiva TV

Programming
- Subchannels: 8.8: Tiva TV; 64.1: Único TV
- Affiliations: Spanish Independent

Ownership
- Owner: Eastern Television (a subsidiary of Iglesia Cristiana El Caballero de la Cruz, Inc.); (Eastern Television Corporation)
- Operator: Grupo TIVA
- Sister stations: WECN

History
- Founded: 1990
- First air date: March 7, 1997
- Former channel numbers: Analog: 34 (UHF, 1997–2009); Digital: 33 (UHF, 2009–2018)
- Former affiliations: Religious (via WECN; 1997–2006, 2007–2010); Citytv (2006–2007); teleSUR (2010–2014); Silent (2014–2015); The Retro Channel (2015)

Technical information
- Facility ID: 15320
- ERP: 50 kW (main); 18 kW (STA)
- HAAT: 823.1 m (2,700 ft)
- Transmitter coordinates: 18°18′29.0″N 65°47′40.0″W
- Translator(s): WSJN-CD 8.1 San Juan; WQSJ-CD 8.1 Quebradillas; W08EI-D 8.2 Guaynabo; W08EJ-D 8.2 Añasco; W08EH-D 8.1 Ponce

Links
- Website: www.tivatv.com www.unicotv.com

W08EI-D
Translator of WRUA, Fajardo, Puerto Rico
- Guaynabo–San Juan; Puerto Rico
- City: Guaynabo, Puerto Rico
- Channels: Digital: 8 (VHF); Virtual: 8
- Branding: see WRUA; Salvacion TV (on DT2)

Programming
- Subchannels: 8.2: Tiva TV; 8.3: Salvación TV; 8.7: Paraiso TV
- Affiliations: Independent

Ownership
- Owner: Grupo TIVA; (Alejandro Luciano)

History
- Founded: 2010
- First air date: June 6, 2014

Technical information
- Facility ID: 182428
- Class: LPTV
- ERP: 1,000 kW
- HAAT: 776 m (2,546 ft)

WRUA (channel 8), branded on-air as Tiva TV, is a Spanish-language independent television station serving northeastern Puerto Rico that is licensed to Fajardo. The station is owned by Eastern Television Corporation and operated by Grupo TIVA, a joint venture between Dr. Norman Gonzalez Chacon, under Dr. Norman's Broadcasting (stockholder), Iglesia Cristiana El Caballero de la Cruz (station licensee) & Alejandro Luciano (shareholder, owner of translator stations). The station is showing lifestyle and health programs. WRUA maintains its studios located at Julio Andino Street, at the corner of Simon Madera Avenue in Rio Piedras and its transmitter is located in the El Yunque National Forest.

W08EI-D (virtual and digital channel 8) in Guaynabo operates as a full-time translator of WRUA, serving San Juan and eastern Puerto Rico. The station is owned by Alejandro Luciano. The transmitter is located at Cerro La Marquesa in Aguas Buenas.

== History ==
On March 7, 1997, WRUA channel 34 started broadcasting religious programming. WRUA was owned by Damarys de Jesus, who serves as a general manager. In 2000, WRUA is sold to Eastern Television Corporation for $40,000, and joining the Telecadena ECN religious network, as satellite of WECN.

From 2006 to 2007, WRUA operated as a standard independent station, using the Citytv branding, under license from CHUM Limited – it was the first Citytv franchise on American soil. Rogers Media discontinued the licensing for WRUA, after its acquisition of Citytv, and the station formerly serves as a translator for WECN.

Both prior to its time as Citytv and after, WRUA was and still is a religious station.

WECN & WRUA forces to shut down on October 22, 2014, due to financial reasons. as of 2015, WECN is Silent, and its sale is pending to the new officers & directors, under Único TV Media for $1.9 million. On March 1, 2015; WRUA returns to the air, and will become a Satellite of WVQS-LD, repeating Telemicro Internacional on Channel 33.1 & The Retro Channel on 33.2. On April 17, WRUA will become a full-time Locally owned Independent station, broadcasting Retro Music Videos on channel 33.1, just before WVQS-LD moves CTNi to 50.1 & Telemicro Internacional to WSJU-TV channel 31.1.

On August 10, 2015, WRUA moves its frequency from 33.1 to channel 8.1, becoming a satellite of WWXY-LD, as part of the Tiva TV Network.

On October 27, 2015, WRUA will sell $1,000,000 to Grupo TIVA (Dr. Norman Gonzalez, president, Edwin Gonzalez, general manager), the owners of WWXY-LD, marking its move to low-power channel 38, and will become the first full-power VHF O&O television station to be owned by TIVA. The sale was completed on December 7, 2015.

== Digital television ==
The stations' digital signals are multiplexed:

Virtual channels for WRUA
Channel	Video	Short name	Programming
8.8	720p	TIVA	Main WRUA programming / TIVA TV
64.1	480i	WECN	Translator of WECN / Único TV

Virtual channels for W08EI-D (digital channel 8)
Channel	Video	Short name	Programming
8.2	720p	Tiva HD	Translator of WRUA / TIVA TV
8.3	720p	Salv TV	Salvación TV
8.7	480i	WTPM	Translator of WTPM-LD / Paraiso TV

=== Analog-to-digital conversion ===
On February 17, 2009, WECN and WRUA signed off their analog signals.

== Translator stations ==
WRUA can be seen across Puerto Rico on the following stations:

City of license	Callsign	Channel
San Juan	WSJN-CD	8.1
Guaynabo	W08EI-D	8.2
Ponce	W08EH-D	8.1
Añasco	W08EJ-D	8.1
Quebradillas	WQSJ-CD	8.1
