= WORA-TV =

Television station in Mayagüez, Puerto Rico

- Mayagüez–Aguadilla; Puerto Rico
- City: Mayagüez, Puerto Rico
- Channels: Digital: 29 (UHF); Virtual: 5, 10
- Branding: WORA 5 / ABC Puerto Rico (general); ABC News Extra (newscasts)

Programming
- Affiliations: 5.1: ABC; for others, see § Subchannels

Ownership
- Owner: Telecinco Media Holdings; (Telecinco, Inc.)
- Sister stations: WRFB

History
- Founded: January 27, 1955
- First air date: October 12, 1955
- Former channel numbers: Analog: 5 (VHF, 1955–2009)
- Former affiliations: Spanish Independent (1955–1969); Repeater for WRIK-TV (1969–1979); Repeater for WAPA-TV (1979–1985); Repeater for WKAQ-TV (1985–1994, 2015—2019); Repeater for WLII-DT (1995–2014)
- Call sign meaning: Named after former sister station WORA (AM)

Technical information
- Licensing authority: FCC
- Facility ID: 64865
- ERP: 1,000 kW
- HAAT: 634.2 m (2,081 ft)
- Transmitter coordinates: 18°8′56″N 66°59′20″W
- Translator(s): W05CY-D 5.5 Mayagüez; W10BG-D 10.1 Mayagüez

Links
- Public license information: Public file; LMS
- Website: www.abc.pr

WORA-TV (channel 5), branded ABC Puerto Rico, is a television station in Mayagüez, Puerto Rico, affiliated with ABC and owned by Telecinco Media Holdings. WORA-TV's studios are located on Avenida Ponce de León in Santurce, with additional studios at the Guanajibo Building on Calle Clemente in Mayagüez. The station's transmitter is located at Monte del Estado in Maricao.

WRFB (channel 5) in Carolina operates as a full-time satellite of WORA-TV, serving San Juan and eastern Puerto Rico.

== History ==
Former WORA-TV logo from 1998 to 2011.

Founded by Alfredo Ramírez de Arellano y Bártoli in 1955, WORA-TV was the first television station on Puerto Rico's west coast and the third station islandwide after WKAQ-TV and WAPA-TV. The station was named for then-sister station WORA radio (760 AM), which one year later was joined by WORA-FM (97.5 FM, now WIOB), the first FM broadcaster on the west coast. During its early years, the station produced its own programming, but its schedule eventually shifted toward infomercials, possibly due to the lack of interest from local businesses in advertising on television. In 1969, WORA-TV became a repeater station for WRIK-TV, airing their programming on the west coast of the island.

In 1979, WORA-TV entered into an affiliation agreement with San Juan-based WAPA-TV, ending its run as a locally-run independent station. After that, most television stations on the island's western coast followed suit. By joining economically stronger stations from the San Juan market, market divisions on the island ended.

In 1985, WORA-TV changed its affiliation agreement to WKAQ-TV, and on January 1, 1995, it began a new affiliation agreement with WLII.

Former WORA-TV logo from 2014 to 2022.

On September 19, 2014, it was announced that WORA would become an ABC affiliate on November 1, 2014, replacing low-power station WPRU-LP, carrying the network on a subchannel branded as ABC 5.

On January 1, 2015, WORA-TV again become a semi-satellite of WKAQ-TV on channel 5.1. Univision programming moved to WOLE-DT channel 12, on the same date. On March 9, 2015, WORA's third digital subchannel added a new channel, Vive, which broadcast series from Televisión Española. Vive later switched to a simulcast of the 24H news channel from TVE on July 1, 2019.

On June 27, 2019, WORA-TV announced that it would end its affiliation with WKAQ-TV by December 31, leaving Telemundo without a western affiliate after more than four years; later, Hemisphere Media Group, the owners of WAPA-TV, announced that Telemundo would air on a subchannel of WAPA-owned WNJX-TV on January 1, 2020. On December 18, WORA-TV announced that ABC programming would move the station's primary channel on January 1, 2020.

On December 1, 2020, WORA-TV, WRFB and its translator stations launched Telecinco (subchannel 5.4), a new independent station combining news programming from RT and horse racing from Hipodromo Camarero. It was the second major change on the multiplex; earlier that year, the Interamerican University of Puerto Rico began offering online classes as "Inter Online TV" on subchannel 5.2. On March 1, 2022, the station removed RT programming after the 2022 Russian invasion of Ukraine, replacing it with Deutsche Welle.

== Programming ==
In addition to ABC network programming, WORA-TV airs some local programming in Spanish, mostly on Sunday afternoons.

=== News operation ===
WORA-TV had a small news division branded WORA-TV Noticias, which aired during WKAQ-TV's Telenoticias news broadcasts on the Telemundo subchannel. These 15- to 30-minute news segments focus on events happening in and around Mayagüez and Puerto Rico's west coast. On June 28, 2019, the day after the end of the WKAQ rebroadcast agreement was announced, WORA-TV laid off 19 employees and closed its entire news department.

Currently, WORA-TV airs a simulcast of WABC-TV's Eyewitness News. Unlike most ABC affiliates, which produce their local newscasts in English, WORA-TV produces their local newscasts in Spanish. The local programs, Directo y Sin Filtro (hosted by Limarys Suarez, Carmen Jovet, and Jonathan Lebrón Ayala) and Primetime (hosted by Nicole Marie Colón), are broadcast in the evening.

On April 14, 2021, after nearly two years without a regional news operation, WORA-TV announced its return to news programming with the launch of ABC News Extra, a local 7 p.m. weeknight newscast anchored by Veronique Abreu Tañon and Yarimar Marrero.

=== Local programs produced by WORA-TV ===
- ABC News Extra
- Directo y Sin Filtro
- Primetime
- De Show con Gricel
- Fan Zone
- La Gran Entrevista
- Veronique
- Juan de Vega de Show
- Por las Fiestas de mi Pueblo
- Turismo con Perea
- Muy Interesante

== Technical information ==
=== Subchannels ===
Subchannels of WORA-TV, WRFB and repeaters
Channel			Res.	Short name	Programming
WORA-TV; WRFB	W05CY-D	W10BG-D	Res.	Short name	Programming
5.1	5.5	10.1	720p	ABC-PR	ABC
5.2	5.6	10.2	720p	Tele5.2	DW
5.4	5.8	10.4	720p	Tele5.4	The Retro Channel (music videos) / Camarero TV

=== Analog-to-digital conversion ===
WORA-TV ended regular programming on its analog signal, over VHF channel 5, on June 12, 2009, the official date when full-power television stations in the United States transitioned from analog to digital broadcasts under federal mandate. The station's digital signal remained on its pre-transition UHF channel 29, using virtual channel 5.

As part of the SAFER Act, WORA-TV kept its analog signal on the air until June 26 to inform viewers of the digital television transition through a loop of public service announcements from the National Association of Broadcasters.

=== Translator stations ===
WORA-TV and its subchannels can be seen across Puerto Rico on the following stations:

- Carolina: WRFB 5.1
- Fajardo: W05DA-D
- Mayagüez: W05CY-D
- Mayagüez: W10BG-D
- Ponce: W05DB-D
- San Lorenzo: W29EE-D
