= WORO-DT =

Television station in Fajardo, Puerto Rico

- Fajardo–San Juan; Puerto Rico
- City: Fajardo, Puerto Rico
- Channels: Digital: 13 (VHF); Virtual: 13
- Branding: TeleOro Canal 13 (general) Noticias 13 (newscasts); EWTN Español (13.2); Shabum TV (13.3)

Programming
- Affiliations: 13.1/13.4: Independent; 13.2: EWTN Español; 13.3: Shabum TV

Ownership
- Owner: Archdiocese of San Juan de Puerto Rico (Grupo RTC); (Tele Oro Canal 13 - WORO-DT Trust)
- Sister stations: WORO, WKVM

History
- Founded: 1984
- First air date: November 1, 1984
- Former call signs: WPRV-TV (1984–2006); WORO-TV (2006–2009)
- Former channel numbers: Analog: 13 (VHF, 1984–2009); Digital: 33 (UHF, 2004–2009)
- Former affiliations: ABC (1984–1989); Fox (1989–1992); Silent (1992–1995); Deportes 13 (2002–2007)
- Call sign meaning: Oro = Spanish for gold

Technical information
- Licensing authority: FCC
- Facility ID: 73901
- ERP: 30 kW
- HAAT: 355 m (1,165 ft)
- Transmitter coordinates: 18°18′28″N 65°47′41″W

Links
- Public license information: Public file; LMS
- Website: www.canal13pr.tv www.shabum.tv

WORO-DT (channel 13), branded TeleOro Canal 13, is an educational-religious independent television station licensed to Fajardo, Puerto Rico. The station is owned by Grupo RTC under the Roman Catholic Archdiocese of San Juan, WORO-DT's studios are located on Avenida Iturregui in Carolina, and its transmitter is located in the El Yunque National Forest.

== History ==
=== A 25-year legal fight ===
On July 16, 1958, Continental Broadcasting Corporation, owner of radio station WHOA in San Juan, was awarded a construction permit to build channel 13 in Fajardo, the first television station to be licensed there. The new station, which took the call letters WSTE (unrelated to the current WSTE on channel 7), proposed a transmitter in the Sardinera neighborhood of Fajardo. Continental's primary stakeholder, Carmina Méndez de Miller, sold the construction permit three years later to WSTE-TV, Inc., receiving 20 percent of the new company's stock; the new company was owned by the Griffin-Leake group.

Under Griffin-Leake control, WSTE set its sights on more powerful facilities. On November 10, 1961, just days after consummating its purchase, WSTE-TV, Inc., filed to move the tower to El Yunque, from which it would put a signal into San Juan. The Federal Communications Commission (FCC) initially awarded the grant in May 1962, but a group of objectors soon emerged to appeal the grant in the United States Court of Appeals for the District of Columbia Circuit. This group consisted of San Juan television stations WAPA-TV and WKAQ-TV, a consortium of mobile radio users, and San Juan's only UHF outlet, WTSJ-TV (channel 18), alleging potentially harmful interference, misrepresentations with the FCC, and potential harm to the development of UHF broadcasting. Two more site change amendments were made by WSTE in response to interference concerns to radar and aviation systems. However, these were not sufficient to cure the deficiencies, and in February 1968, the FCC rescinded the grant and designated WSTE's transmitter site application for hearing.

In 1972, the FCC denied the revised application, this time on technical grounds, because the proposed station would not have provided a city-grade signal to 100 percent of Fajardo, the city of license. WSTE-TV appealed to the court of appeals, proposing to add a UHF translator on channel 56 in order to fill in gaps in coverage in Fajardo. The FCC had found in a 1971 case that the island's rugged terrain had merited tempering of the application of its rules. After the court found in WSTE's favor in 1977 in large part due to the translator application, the FCC granted the application in 1979 and denied a petition for reconsideration by WAPA in 1980.

=== As an English-language station ===
On November 1, 1984, channel 13 finally appeared in Puerto Rico, under the new call letters WPRV-TV. The station, with facilities in Fajardo and the Río Piedras area of San Juan, was primarily an English-language outlet, affiliated with ABC and in the late 1980s and early 1990s with Fox (WUJA was the island's original Fox affiliate from 1986 to 1989).

WPRV-TV struggled financially throughout its history. In December 1987, it filed for Chapter 11 bankruptcy; the case was converted to Chapter 7 in 1989. The largest creditor of the television station, Ponce Federal Bank, was bypassed in favor of an attempt to sell channel 13 to Puerto Rico Family Channel, Inc. (PRFC). Problems soon emerged with the proposed buyer. The trustee appointed to manage the television station could not identify the principals of the buyer, and questions arose about its financial capacity; further, one of the representatives of the company, Norman González Chacón, was facing felony criminal charges that the court feared could jeopardize the license transfer. Amid the proceedings, channel 13 went silent on September 22, 1992.

=== Archdiocesan ownership ===
In March 1994, WPRV-TV was sold to the Archdiocese of San Juan, which was allowed to own the failing TV station alongside its AM and FM outlets. Channel 13 returned to the air on October 11, 1995, as "Teleoro", a Catholic television station under the management of Cardinal Luis Aponte Martinez. The call letters were changed to WORO-TV in 2006 to match the archdiocese's WORO (92.5 FM) serving San Juan.

In 2002, WORO-TV leased its prime time hours to local producer Angelo Medina for his sport programming block branded as "Deportes 13". During these hours, Deportes 13 aired sports-related programming and events such as MLB, NBA, and Liga de Voleibol Superior Masculino among others. The format was discontinued on May 13, 2007.

Singer, writer and producer Silverio Pérez had a variety show called Buenas Noches con Silverio (Good Night with Silverio).

In August 2008, TeleOro announced that the station would develop a news program titled Hora Informativa. The program's goal is to cover local news as well as material that other channels consider "soft". Segments were led by Luis Penchi and José Ángel Cordero and covered controversial themes that might not be covered otherwise due to the station's religious focus. Today, WORO produces local news (branded as Noticias 13) weeknights at 6 and 11 p.m., as well as Saturdays at 5 p.m. and Sundays at 4 p.m.

On September 20, 2017, in the aftermath of Hurricane Maria, WORO-DT was forced to go off the air, suffering damage to the station's building, transmitter and equipment. The station then broadcast as a subchannel of Hector Marcano's WWXY-LD on channel 38.3 until August 1, 2018. The station returned to the air on August 27, 2018, from a provisional antenna. On February 5, 2019, WORO-DT resumed full-power broadcasts from its new and powerful transmitter from the top of El Yunque, that covers the entire island. Repairs to the old transmitter equipment were made by the engineering department.

== Technical information ==
=== Subchannels ===
The station's digital signal is multiplexed:

Subchannels of WORO-DT
Channel	Res.	Short name	Programming
13.1	1080i	WORO-HD	Main WORO-DT programming
13.2	480i	EWTN	EWTN Español
13.3	480i	SHABUM	Shabum TV (Kids Programming)

=== Analog-to-digital conversion ===
On February 17, 2009, WORO signed off its analog signal and completed its move to digital.

== See also ==
- Catholic television
- Catholic television channels
- Catholic television networks
