= WCCV-TV =

Television station in Arecibo, Puerto Rico

WCCV-TV and WVSN
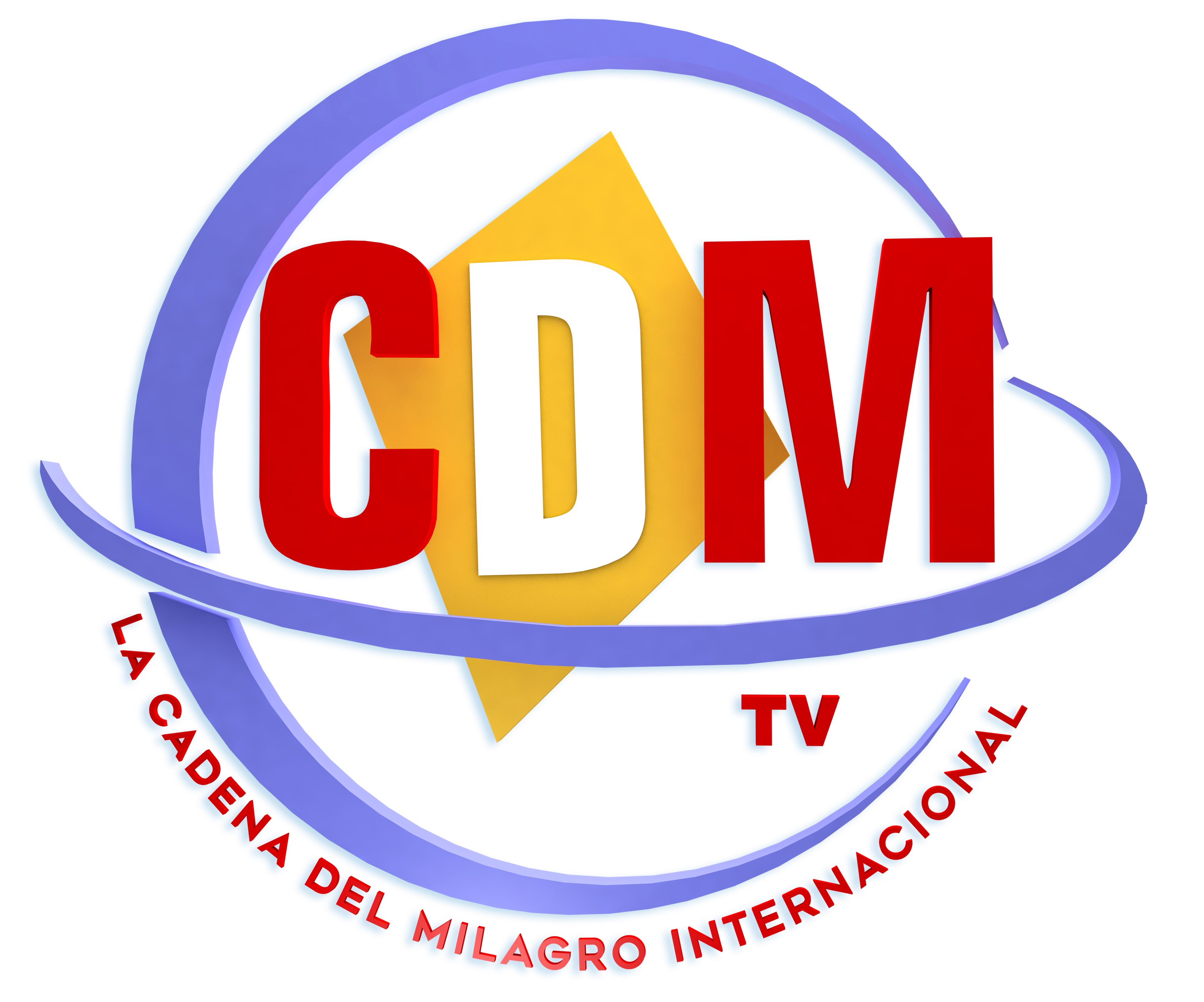

WCCV-TV: Arecibo; WVSN: Humacao; Puerto Rico
- Channels for WCCV-TV: Digital: 35 (UHF); Virtual: 54
- Channels for WVSN: Digital: 23 (UHF); Virtual: 68
- Branding: La Cadena del Milagro (The Miracle Network)

Programming
- Affiliations: 54.1/68.1: Spanish religious independent

Ownership
- Owner: Asociacion Evangelistica Cristo Viene, Inc.

History
- Founded: WCCV-TV: April 29, 1988; WVSN: March 12, 1984 (original incarnation) October 30, 1986 (current incarnation)
- First air date: November 15, 1981
- Former call signs: WCCV-TV: WATX-TV (1982–1989)
- Former channel number: WCCV-TV: Analog: 54 (UHF, 1982–2009); Digital: 46 (UHF, 2005–2019); WVSN: Analog: 68 (UHF, 1984–2009); Digital: 49 (UHF, 2005–2019)
- Former affiliations: Independent (1982–1989): WVSN: Music videos (1984–1986); Silent (1986); Independent (1986–1989)
- Call sign meaning: Cadena Cristo Viene

Technical information
- Licensing authority: FCC
- Facility ID: WCCV-TV: 3001; WVSN: 67190
- ERP: WCCV-TV: 60 kW; WVSN: 50 kW
- HAAT: WCCV-TV: 521 m (1,709 ft); WVSN: 623 m (2,044 ft)
- Transmitter coordinates: WCCV-TV: 18°14′0″N 66°45′33″W; WVSN: 18°16′37″N 65°51′8″W
- Translators: W13DI-D Yauco, etc.; W16DX-D Aguada; W18EN-D Sion Farm, USVI

Links
- Public license information: WCCV-TV: Public file; LMS; WVSN: Public file; LMS
- Website: cdminternacional.com

WCCV-TV (channel 54) is a religious independent television station in Arecibo, Puerto Rico. It is relayed on satellite station WVSN (channel 68) in Humacao. Owned by the Asociacion Evangelistica Cristo Viene, Inc., the stations maintain studios at Barrio Membrillo in Camuy. WCCV-TV's transmitter is located at Cerro Roncador in Utuado, while WVSN's antenna is at Barrio Cubuy in Canovanas.

== History ==
=== WCCV-TV ===
WCCV-TV began operations in 1982 as WATX-TV, and was an independent with local programming. It was owned by Bay Industries. In 1984, WATX-TV, became a satellite of WSJU (channel 18), later in 1987, to WRWR-TV (channel 30). On January 7, 1988, televangelist Yiye Avila bought WATX-TV for $40,000; the sale was completed on August 25, 1988. In 1989, WATX-TV changed its callsign to WCCV-TV and became a religious network known as La Cadena del Milagro.

=== WVSN ===
WVSN began operations on March 12, 1984, and was the first independent television station that broadcast music videos from the 60s, 70s & 80s based in Humacao. WVSN was owned by Radio Voz, until its closure on August 6, 1986. On October 30, 1986, WVSN resumed broadcasting, operating under the station general manager, Tito Atiles Natal, and was broadcasting music videos and local programming. In the 1990s, Yiye Avila bought WVSN for $20,000 and it became a repeater of WCCV-TV, La Cadena del Milagro. Currently, WVSN has its studios and offices located in Caparra Terrace in San Juan with its transmitter at Barrio Cubuy in Canovanas.

== Technical information ==
=== Subchannel ===
Subchannels of WCCV-TV and WVSN
Subchannel		Res.	Short name		Programming
WCCV-TV	WVSN	Res.	WCCV-TV	WVSN	Programming
54.1	68.1	1080i	WCCV-HD	WVSN-HD	Main programming

=== Analog-to-digital conversion ===
On February 17, 2009, WCCV-TV and WVSN signed off their analog signals and completed their move to digital.
