= List of radio stations in U.S. territories =

The following are lists of FCC-licensed radio stations in the unincorporated territories of the United States, which can be sorted by their call signs, frequencies, cities of license, licensees, and programming formats.

== American Samoa ==
Call sign	Frequency	City of License	Licensee	Format
KGIF	88.1 FM	Tafuna	Leone Church of Christ	
KIOE	91.3 FM	Utulei Village	Leone Church of Christ	Religious
KKAS-LP	94.5 FM	Tafuna	Life Inc Ministry	Religious Teaching
KKBT	104.7 FM	Leone	Contemporary Communications LLC	Rhythmic Contemporary
KKHJ-FM	93.1 FM	Pago Pago	South Seas Broadcasting, Inc.	Hot AC/Pop/Top 40
KMOA	89.7 FM	Nu'uuli	Teen Challenge of American Samoa	Religious
KPPO	90.5 FM	Mapusaga	Second Samoan Congregational Church of Long Beach	Religious
KSBS-FM	92.1 FM	Pago Pago	Samoa Technologies	R&B Adult Contemporary, Samoan & Polynesian Mix
KULA-LP	95.1 FM	Ili'Ili	Pacific Islands Bible School	Religious Teaching
KVPP	88.9 FM	Pago Pago	Rev. Shannon Cummings DBA Pure Truth Ministries	
WVUV-FM	103.1 FM	Fagaitua	South Seas Broadcasting, Inc.	Samoan/Polynesian

== Guam ==
Call sign	Frequency	City of License	Licensee	Format
KGCA-LP	106.9 FM	Tumon	KGCA Inc.	Religious
KGUM-FM	105.1 FM	Dededo	Glimpse Media	News/Talk (weekdays); Caribbean music (with local Reggae) (weekends)
KHMG	88.1 FM	Barrigada	Harvest Christian Academy	Religious
KICH	630 AM	Agana	Good News Broadcasting Corporation	Chamorro
KIJI	104.3 FM	Tumon	Choice Broadcasting Company, LLC	Classic Hits
KISH	102.9 FM	Agana	Inter-Island Communications	Chamorro
KMOY	92.7 FM	Dededo	Moy Communications, Inc.	Adult Top 40
KNUT	101.1 FM	Tamuning	Choice Broadcasting Company	Rhythmic Contemporary
KOKU	100.3 FM	Agana	Moy Communications, Inc.	Top 40/CHR
KOLG	90.9 FM	Agana	Anthony Sablan A Puron, OFM Cap. D.D. Archbishop of Agana	Religious
KPRG	89.3 FM	Agana	Guam Educational Radio Foundation	NPR/Classical/Jazz/Reggae/New Wave/Talk
KSDA-FM	91.9 FM	Agat	Good News Broadcasting Corporation	Religious
KSTO	95.5 FM	Agana	Inter-Island Communications	Adult Contemporary
KTKB-FM	101.9 FM	Agana	KM Broadcasting of Guam, L.L.C.	OPM/Top 40
KTWG	801 AM	Agana	Edward H. Poppe, Jr. and Frances W. Poppe	Religious
KUAM-FM	93.9 FM	Agana	Pacific Telestations, LLC	Adult Contemporary
KUSG	1350 AM	Agana	Management Advisory Services, Inc.	News/Talk
KZGU	99.5 FM	Mangilao	Glimpse Media	Country
KZGZ	97.5 FM	Agana	Glimpse Media	Rhythmic Contemporary

== Northern Mariana Islands ==
Call sign	Frequency	City of License	Licensee	Format
KCKD	90.7 FM	Garapan	Marianas Educational Media Services, Inc.	Religious
KKMP	1440 AM	Garapan-Saipan	Blue Continent Communications Inc.	Island music
KMOP	91.5 FM	Garapan	Marianas Educational Media Services, Inc.	Religious
KORU	89.9 FM	Garapan-Saipan	Good News Broadcasting Corporation	Religious
KPXP	97.9 FM	Garapan-Saipan	Sorensen Pacific Broadcasting Inc.	Adult album alternative
KRNM	88.1 FM	Chalan Kanoa-Saipan	Marianas Educational Media Services, Inc.	NPR
KWAW	100.3 FM	Garapan-Saipan	Leon Padilla Ganacias	Rhythmic contemporary
KZMI	103.9 FM	Garapan-Saipan	Holonet Corporation	Adult Contemporary

== Puerto Rico ==
Call sign	Frequency	City of License	Licensee	Format
WABA	850 AM	Aguadilla	Aguadilla Radio & TV Corp, Inc.	Spanish Variety
WAEL-FM	96.1 FM	Maricao	WAEL, Inc.	Spanish CHR
WALO	1240 AM	Humacao	Ochoa Broadcasting Corp.	Spanish News/Talk
WAPA	680 AM	San Juan	NotiRadio Broadcasting, LLC	Spanish News/Talk
WBMJ	1190 AM	San Juan	Calvary Evangelistic Mission, Inc.	Spanish Religious
WBQN	1580 AM	Aguadilla	NotiRadio Broadcasting, LLC	Spanish News/Talk
WBSG	1510 AM	Lajas	Perry Broadcasting Systems	Spanish Variety
WBYM	1560 AM	Bayamon	Caguas Educational TV, Inc.	Spanish Religious
WCGB	1060 AM	Juana Diaz	Calvary Evangelistic Mission, Inc	Spanish Religious
WCMA	1600 AM	Bayamon	Aurio A. Matos Barreto	Spanish Variety
WCMN	1280 AM	Arecibo	Caribbean Broadcasting Corp.	Spanish CHR/Latino
WCMN-FM	107.3 FM	Arecibo	Caribbean Broadcasting Corp.	Top 40/Spanish and English CHR
WCPR	1450 AM	Coamo	Coamo Broadcasting Corp.	Spanish Variety
WCRP	88.1 FM	Guayama	Ministerio Radial Cristo Viene Pronto, Inc.	Contemporary Christian
WCXQ-LP	98.1 FM	Isabela-Camuy	Community Action Corp.	Spanish Variety
WDEP	1490 AM	Ponce	Media Power Group, Inc.	Spanish News/Talk
WDIN	102.9 FM	Camuy	Northcoast Broadcasters, Inc.	Spanish Variety
WDNO	960 AM	Quebradillas	New Life Broadcasting Inc.	Contemporary Christian
WEGA	1350 AM	Vega Baja	A Radio Company, Inc.	Spanish Contemporary Christian
WEGM	95.1 FM	San German	Spanish Broadcasting System Holding Company, Inc.	Spanish and English Top 40/Contemporary
WELX	101.5 FM	Isabela	La Equis Broadcasting Corp.	Spanish CHR/Latino
WENA	1330 AM	Yauco	Southern Broadcasting Corp.	Spanish Variety
WERR	104.1 FM	Vega Alta	Radio Redentor	Contemporary Christian
WEXS	610 AM	Patillas	Community Broadcasting, Inc.	Spanish Variety
WFAB	890 AM	Ceiba	Daniel Rosario Diaz	Religious Ministry
WFDT	105.5 FM	Aguada	Arso Radio Corp.	Adult Contemporary
WFID	95.7 FM	Rio Piedras	Madifide, Inc.	Adult Contemporary
WGDL	1200 AM	Lares	Lares Broadcasting Corp.	Local Information/Music
WGIT	1660 AM	Canovanas	International Broadcasting Corporation	Spanish Religious
WHOY	1210 AM	Salinas	Colon Radio Corp.	Spanish Variety
WIAC	740 AM	San Juan	Bestov Broadcasting, Inc.	Spanish News/Talk
WIBS	1540 AM	Guayama	International Broadcasting Corporation	Spanish Variety
WIDA	1400 AM	Carolina	Radio Vida, Inc.	Spanish Religious
WIDA-FM	90.5 FM	Carolina	Radio Vida, Inc.	Religious
WIDI	99.5 FM	Quebradillas	AA Broadcast, LLC	Adult Hits
WIOA	99.9 FM	San Juan	International Broadcasting Corporation	Top 40/Spanish and English CHR
WIOB	97.5 FM	Mayagüez	Spanish Broadcasting System Holding Company, Inc.	Spanish Tropical
WIOC	105.1 FM	Ponce	International Broadcasting Corporation	Top 40/Spanish and English CHR
WIPR	940 AM	San Juan	Puerto Rico Public Broadcasting Corporation	Spanish News/Talk/Music
WIPR-FM	91.3 FM	San Juan	Puerto Rico Public Broadcasting Corporation	Classical Music
WISA	1390 AM	Isabela	Isabela Broadcasting, Inc.	Spanish News/Talk
WIVA-FM	100.3 FM	Aguadilla	Arso Radio Corp.	Spanish Tropical
WIVV	1370 AM	Island Of Vieques	Calvary Evangelistic Mission, Inc.	Spanish Religious
WJDZ	90.1 FM	Pastillo	Siembra Fertil PR, Inc.	Spanish Religious
WJED-LP	107.9 FM	Guanica	Onda Cultural del Sur, Inc.	Educational
WJIT	1250 AM	Sabana	Aurio A. Matos Barreto	Spanish Variety
WJKL	105.7 FM	San Juan	Educational Media Foundation	Contemporary Christian
WJVP	89.3 FM	Culebra	Tabernaculo de Santidad Inc.	Spanish Religious
WKAQ	580 AM	San Juan	WLII/WSUR License Partnership, G.P.	Spanish News/Talk
WKAQ-FM	104.7 FM	San Juan	WLII/WSUR License Partnership, G.P.	Spanish and English Contemporary (CHR)
WKFE	1550 AM	Yauco	Media Power Group, Inc.	Spanish News/Talk
WKJB	710 AM	Mayagüez	Radio Station WKJB AM-FM, Inc.	Spanish
WKUM	1470 AM	Orocovis	Cumbre Media Group Corp.	Spanish News/Talk
WKVM	810 AM	San Juan	Radio Paz/WKVM-AM Trust	Catholic
WLEO	1170 AM	Ponce	Iglesia Episcopal Puertorriqueña, Inc.	Spanish Variety
WLEY	1080 AM	Cayey	Media Power Group, Inc.	Spanish News/Talk
WLRP	1460 AM	San Sebastian	Las Raices Pepinianas, Inc.	Spanish Variety
WLUZ	88.5 FM	Levittown	La Gigante Siembra, Inc.	Contemporary Christian
WLYM-LP	90.9 FM	Mayaguez-Anasco	Feeding Homeless Corp.	Adult Contemporary
WMAA-LP	93.7 FM	Moca	Behind the Sound Corp.	Spanish Contemporary Christian
WMDD	1480 AM	Fajardo	Pan Caribbean Broadcasting of PR, Inc.	Spanish Music
WMEG	106.9 FM	Guayama	WMEG Licensing, Inc.	Spanish and English Top 40/Contemporary
WMIA	1070 AM	Arecibo	NotiRadio Broadcasting, LLC	Spanish
WMIO	102.3 FM	Cabo Rojo	Arso Radio Corp.	Rhythmic Top 40
WMLG	89.9 FM	Guayanilla	Caguas Educational TV, Inc.	Contemporary Christian
WMNT	1500 AM	Manati	Manati Radio and Media	Local Information/Music
WMSW	1120 AM	Hatillo	Aurora Broadcasting Corp.	News/Talk
WMTI	1160 AM	Barceloneta-Manati	NotiRadio Broadcasting, LLC	Spanish News/Talk
WNEL	1430 AM	Caguas	Turabo Radio Corp.	Spanish News/Music
WNIK	1230 AM	Arecibo	Unik Broadcasting System Corp.	News/Talk
WNIK-FM	106.5 FM	Arecibo	Kelly Broadcasting System Corp.	CHR Spanish/English
WNNV	91.7 FM	San German	Siembra Fertil PR, Inc.	Contemporary Christian
WNOD	94.1 FM	Mayagüez	Spanish Broadcasting System Holding Company, Inc.	Reggaeton/Urban AC
WNRT	96.9 FM	Manati	La Voz Evangelica de Puerto Rico	Contemporary Christian
WNVE	98.7 FM	Culebra	Juan Carlos Matos Barreto	Spanish Religious
WNVI	1040 AM	Moca	Aurio A. Matos Barreto	Spanish Variety
WNVM	97.7 FM	Cidra	New Life Broadcasting, Inc.	Contemporary Christian
WODA	94.7 FM	Bayamon	Spanish Broadcasting System Holding Company, Inc.	Reggaeton/Urban AC
WODB-LP	90.9 FM	Caguas	Caguas Community Radio, Inc.	Contemporary Christian
WOIZ	1130 AM	Guayanilla	Radio Antillas of Harriet Broadcasters	Spanish Variety
WOLA	1380 AM	Barranquitas	Radio Procer, Inc.	Spanish Variety
WOQI	1020 AM	Adjuntas	Radio Casa Pueblo, Inc.	Community Radio
WORA	760 AM	Mayagüez	Arso Radio Corp.	Spanish News/Talk
WORO	92.5 FM	Corozal	Radio ORO/WORO-FM Trust Archdiocese of San Juan	Catholic
WOSO	1300 AM	Mayagüez	NotiRadio Broadcasting, LLC	Spanish News/Talk
WOYE	97.3 FM	Rio Grande	AA Broadcast, LLC	Adult Hits
WPAB	550 AM	Ponce	WPAB, Inc.	Spanish News/Talk
WPPC	1570 AM	Penuelas	Radio Felicidad, Inc.	Religious Ministry
WPRA	990 AM	Mayagüez	WPRA, Inc.	Local Information/Music
WPRM-FM	99.1 FM	San Juan	Arso Radio Corp.	Spanish Tropical
WPRP	910 AM	Ponce	Arso Radio Corp.	Spanish News/Talk
WPUC-FM	88.9 FM	Ponce	Pontifical Catholic University of Puerto Rico Service Association	Catholic
WQBS	870 AM	San Juan	AERCO Broadcasting Corp.	Spanish
WQBS-FM	107.7 FM	Carolina	International Broadcasting Corporation	Reggaeton/Urban AC
WQHD-LP	91.1 FM	Aguada-Aguadilla	West Coast Broadcasting	Oldies
WQII	1140 AM	San Juan	Communications Counsel Group, Inc.	Spanish
WQML	101.5 FM	Ceiba	Caguas Educational TV	Contemporary Christian
WRIO	101.1 FM	Ponce	Arso Radio Corp.	Spanish Tropical
WRRE	1460 AM	Juncos	Maranatha Radio Ministries	Spanish Religious
WRRH	106.1 FM	Hormigueros	Renacer Broadcasters Corp.	Contemporary Christian
WRSJ	1520 AM	San Juan	International Broadcasting Corporation	Spanish Tropical
WRSS	1410 AM	San Sebastian	Angel Vera-Maury	Spanish News/Talk
WRTU	89.7 FM	San Juan	University of Puerto Rico	Educational/Variety
WRUO	88.3 FM	Mayagüez	University of Puerto Rico	Educational/Variety
WRXD	96.5 FM	Fajardo	WRXD Licensing, Inc.	Adult Contemporary
WSKN	1320 AM	San Juan	Media Power Group, Inc.	Spanish News/Talk
WSOL	1090 AM	San German	San German Broadcasters Group	Spanish Variety
WSXQ-LP	90.9 FM	Aguadilla	Super Radio Corp.	Spanish Variety
WTOK-FM	102.5 FM	San Juan	WIAC-FM, Inc.	Top 40/Spanish and English Contemporary (CHR)
WTPM	92.9 FM	Aguadilla	Corp. of the Seventh Day Adventists of West PR	Religious Ministry
WUKQ	1420 AM	Ponce	WLII/WSUR License Partnership, G.P.	Spanish News/Talk
WUKQ-FM	98.7 FM	Mayagüez	WLII/WSUR License Partnership, G.P.	Spanish and English Contemporary (CHR)
WUNO	630 AM	San Juan	Arso Radio Corp.	Spanish News & Talk
WUPR	1530 AM	Utuado	Central Broadcasting Corp.	Spanish Variety
WUTD-FM	89.9 FM	Utuado	Family Educational Association, Inc.	
WUTL-LP	90.9 FM	Utuado	Young Family Sports Association Corporation	Spanish Variety
WVID	90.3 FM	Añasco	Centro Colegial Cristiano, Inc.	Jazz
WVIS	106.1 FM	Vieques	V.I. Stereo Communications Corporation (PR)	American CHR
WVJP	1110 AM	Caguas	Borinquen Broadcasting Co, Inc.	Talk/AC
WVJP-FM	103.3 FM	Caguas	Borinquen Broadcasting Co, Inc.	Spanish Variety
WVOZ	1260 AM	Ponce	NotiRadio Broadcasting, LLC	Spanish News/Talk
WVPJ-LP	107.9 FM	Mayaguez	Iglesia Evangelica Sion, Inc.	Religious Ministry
WWNA	1340 AM	Aguadilla	DBS Radio, Inc.	Spanish Variety
WXEW	840 AM	Yabucoa	WXEW Radio Victoria, Inc.	Spanish News/Talk
WXHD	98.1 FM	Santa Isabel	Amor Radio Group Corp.	Spanish CHR/Latino
WXLX	103.7 FM	Lajas	Radio X Broadcasting Corp.	Spanish CHR/Latino
WXRF	1590 AM	Guayama	NotiRadio Broadcasting, LLC	Spanish News/Talk
WXYX	100.7 FM	Bayamon	Raad Broadcasting Corp.	Spanish CHR/Latino
WYAC	930 AM	Cabo Rojo	Bestov Broadcasting, Inc.	Spanish News/Talk
WYAS	92.1 FM	Luquillo	Radio Sol 92 WZOL, Inc.	Contemporary Christian
WYEL	600 AM	Mayagüez	WLII/WSUR License Partnership, G.P.	Spanish News/Talk
WYKQ-LP	107.9 FM	Aguadilla-Aguada	Radio Transformando Vidas Corp.	Religious
WYQE	92.9 FM	Naguabo	Fajardo Broadcasting Co, Inc.	Spanish Variety
WZAR	101.9 FM	Ponce	Uno Radio of Ponce, Inc.	Adult Contemporary
WZCA	91.7 FM	Quebradillas	La Gigante Siembra, Inc.	Spanish Variety
WZCL-LP	98.1 FM	Cabo Rojo	Clubradio PR Community, Inc.	Adult Contemporary
WZET	92.1 FM	Hormigueros	International Broadcasting Corporation	Urban Adult Contemporary
WZFE-LP	98.3 FM	Moca	Concilio de Iglesias Rios de Vida, Inc.	Religious Ministry
WZMT	93.3 FM	Ponce	Spanish Broadcasting System Holding Company, Inc.	Spanish Tropical
WZNT	93.7 FM	San Juan	Spanish Broadcasting System Holding Company, Inc.	Spanish Tropical
WZOL	98.3 FM	Las Piedras	Radio Sol 92, WZOL, Inc.	Religious Ministry

== United States Virgin Islands ==
Call sign	Frequency	City of License	Owner	Format
WAXJ	103.5 FM	Frederiksted	Reef Broadcasting, Inc.	Urban Contemporary
WDHP	1620 AM	Frederiksted	Reef Broadcasting, Inc.	Full Service
WEVI	101.3 FM	Frederiksted	HSR Communications, LLC	Urban Contemporary
WGOD-FM	97.9 FM	Charlotte Amalie	North Caribbean Conference of SDA Broadcasting Corp.	Religious
WIGT	1690 AM	Charlotte Amalie	Three Angels Corporation	Religious
WIVH	89.9 FM	Christiansted	Good News for Life	Religious
WIVI	102.1 FM	Cruz Bay	Ackley Caribbean Enterprises Inc.	Classic Rock
WJKC	95.1 FM	Christiansted	Radio 95, Incorporated	"Isle 95" Urban Contemporary/Hip Hop/Reggae
WLDV	107.9 FM	Frederiksted	Creative Minds, LLC	Variety
WMNG	104.9 FM	Christiansted	Clara Communications Corporation	"The Mongoose" Classic Hits
WMYP	98.3 FM	Frederiksted	Amanda Friedman	Spanish Music
WSKX	90.7 FM	Christiansted	Better Communication Group, Inc.	
WSTA	1340 AM	Charlotte Amalie	OCC Acquisitions, Inc.	Variety
WSTX	970 AM	Christiansted	Caledonia Communication Corporation	News/Talk
WSTX-FM	100.3 FM	Christiansted	Caledonia Communication Corporation	Reggae
WTJC-LP	96.9 FM	Charlotte Amalie	Methodist Church St. Thomas St. John Circuit Inc.	Religious
WTJX-FM	93.1 FM	Charlotte Amalie	Virgin Islands Public Television System	NPR
WUVI-LP	97.3 FM	John Brewers Bay	University of the Virgin Islands	College radio
WVIE	107.3 FM	Charlotte Amalie	Educational Media Foundation	Contemporary Christian
WVIQ	99.5 FM	Christiansted	JKC Communications of the Virgin Islands, Inc.	Adult Contemporary
WVJZ	105.3 FM	Charlotte Amalie	Gark, LLC	Mainstream Urban
WVSE	91.9 FM	Christiansted	Crucian Educational Nonprofit Group Inc.	Spanish Variety
WVVI-FM	93.5 FM	Christiansted	Rwave, LLC	Country
WVWI	1000 AM	Charlotte Amalie	Infinity Broadcasting, LLC	News/Talk
WWKS	96.1 FM	Charlotte Amalie	Gark, LLC	Urban Contemporary
WZER	104.3 FM	Charlotte Amalie	Radio Redentor Inc.	Contemporary Christian

== Wake Island ==
- KEAD (1490 AM, Defunct)

== See also ==
- Media of Puerto Rico

== Bibliography ==
- "United States AM Stations: Territories and Possessions", Yearbook of Radio and Television, New York: Radio Television Daily, 1964, OCLC 7469377 – via Internet Archive
