= Media of Puerto Rico =

The media of Puerto Rico includes local radio stations, television stations and newspapers; for the majority of all these the language is Spanish. There are also three stations of the American Forces Network.

== Newspapers ==
- El Nuevo Día
- El Vocero
- La Estrella
- Metro
- News Is My Business
- NotiCel
- Primera Hora
- Puerto Rico Daily Sun
- La Democracia
- La Perla del Sur
- The San Juan Star

== Magazines ==
- Vea
- Imagen
- Teve Guía
- IN Puerto Rico Magazine

== Radio stations ==
Radio transmission first began in Puerto Rico on December 3, 1922 with WKAQ (AM), making it the first radio broadcasting station on the island and the fifth in the world. Its purpose was to transmit news and weather updates with commercials. By 1937, the advertising industry had entered radio on the Island; and by the year 1942, there were five radio broadcasting stations in Puerto Rico. These five stations were based in San Juan, Ponce and Mayagüez.

There are currently over one hundred and forty radio stations being broadcast in Puerto Rico as of March 1, 2019. These radio stations broadcast in different formats, some of the most popular being religious, news/talk, and music. The city of San Juan currently transmits more radio stations than any other city in Puerto Rico. Ponce and Mayagüez also remain popular locations for radio transmission.

Radio transmission in Puerto Rico was highly interrupted during Hurricane Maria. After Hurricane Maria had passed, there was a spike in radio use in Puerto Rico, as it served as a main source of news information after the natural disaster.

The following radio stations transmit from Puerto Rico:

Call sign	Frequency	City of License	Licensee	Format
WABA	850 AM	Aguadilla	Aguadilla Radio & TV Corp, Inc.	Spanish Variety
WAEL-FM	96.1 FM	Maricao	WAEL, Inc.	Spanish Music
WALO	1240 AM	Humacao	Ochoa Broadcasting Corp.	Spanish News/Talk
WAPA	1260 AM	Ponce	Wifredo G. Blanco PI	Spanish News/Talk
WBMJ	1190 AM	San Juan	Calvary Evangelistic Mission, Inc.	Spanish Religious
WBQN	680 AM	San Juan	Wifredo G. Blanco PI	Spanish News/Talk
WBSG	1510 AM	Lajas	Perry Broadcasting Systems	Spanish Variety
WBYM	1560 AM	Bayamon	Caguas Educational TV, Inc.	Spanish Religious
WCGB	1060 AM	Juana Diaz	Calvary Evangelistic Mission, Inc	Spanish Religious
WCMA	1600 AM	Bayamon, Fajardo	Ekklesia Broadcasting System	Spanish Religious
WCMN	1280 AM	Arecibo	Caribbean Broadcasting Corp.	Spanish CHR/Latino
WCMN-FM	107.3 FM	Arecibo	Caribbean Broadcasting Corp.	Spanish CHR/Latino
WCPR	1450 AM	Coamo	Coamo Broadcasting Corp.	Spanish Variety
WCRP	88.1 FM	Guayama	Ministerio Radial Cristo Viene Pronto, Inc.	Spanish Religious
WCXQ-LP	98.1 FM	Isabela-Camuy	Community Action Corp.	Spanish Variety
WDEP	1490 AM	Ponce	Media Power Group, Inc.	Spanish News/Talk
WDIN	102.9 FM	Camuy	Northcoast Broadcasters, Inc.	Spanish Variety
WDNO	960 AM	Quebradillas	New Life Broadcasting Inc.	Spanish Music
WEGA	1350 AM	Vega Baja	A Radio Company, Inc.	Spanish Religious
WEGM	95.1 FM	San German	Spanish Broadcasting System Holding Company, Inc.	Spanish and English Top 40/Contemporary
WELX	101.5 FM	Isabela	La Equis Broadcasting Corp.	Spanish CHR/Latino
WENA	1330 AM	Yauco	Southern Broadcasting Corp.	Spanish Variety
WERR	104.1 FM	Vega Alta	Radio Redentor	Spanish Religious
WEXS	610 AM	Patillas	Community Broadcasting, Inc.	Spanish Variety
WFAB	890 AM	Ceiba	Daniel Rosario Diaz	Religious Ministry
WFDT	105.5 FM	Aguada	Arso Radio Corp.	Spanish Adult Contemporary
WFID	95.7 FM	Rio Piedras	Madifide, Inc.	Spanish Adult Contemporary
WGDL	1200 AM	Lares	Lares Broadcasting Corp.	Local Information/Music
WGIT	1660 AM	Canovanas	International Broadcasting Corporation	Spanish Religious
WHOY	1210 AM	Salinas	Colon Radio Corp.	Spanish Variety
WIAC	740 AM	San Juan	Bestov Broadcasting, Inc.	Spanish News/Talk
WIBS	1540 AM	Guayama	International Broadcasting Corporation	Spanish Variety
WIDA	1400 AM	Carolina	Radio Vida, Inc.	Spanish Religious
WIDA-FM	90.5 FM	Carolina	Radio Vida, Inc.	Religious
WIDI	99.5 FM	Quebradillas	AA Broadcast, Inc.	American CHR
WIOA	99.9 FM	San Juan	International Broadcasting Corporation	American CHR
WIOB	97.5 FM	Mayagüez	Spanish Broadcasting System Holding Company, Inc.	Spanish Music/Salsa
WIOC	105.1 FM	Ponce	International Broadcasting Corporation	American CHR
WIPR	940 AM	San Juan	Puerto Rico Public Broadcasting Corporation	Spanish News/Talk/Music
WIPR-FM	91.3 FM	San Juan	Puerto Rico Public Broadcasting Corporation	Classical music
WISA	1390 AM	Isabela	Isabela Broadcasting, Inc.	Spanish News/Talk
WIVA-FM	100.3 FM	Aguadilla	Arso Radio Corp.	Spanish Music/Salsa
WIVV	1370 AM	Island Of Vieques	Calvary Evangelistic Mission, Inc.	Spanish Religious
WJDZ	90.1 FM	Pastillo	Siembra Fertil PR, Inc.	Spanish Religious
WJED-LP	107.9 FM	Guanica	Onda Cultural del Sur, Inc.	Educational
WJIT	1250 AM	Sabana	JP Broadcast Corp.	Spanish Variety
WJKL	105.7 FM	San Juan	Educational Media Foundation	Christian Music
WJVP	89.3 FM	Culebra	Tabernaculo de Santidad Inc.	Spanish Religious
WKAQ	580 AM	San Juan	WLII/WSUR License Partnership, G.P.	Spanish News/Talk
WKAQ-FM	104.7 FM	San Juan	WLII/WSUR License Partnership, G.P.	Spanish and English Contemporary (CHR)
WKFE	1550 AM	Yauco	Media Power Group, Inc.	Spanish News/Talk
WKJB	710 AM	Mayagüez	Radio Station WKJB AM-FM, Inc.	Spanish
WKUM	1470 AM	Orocovis	Cumbre Media Group Corp.	Spanish News/Talk
WKVM	810 AM	San Juan	Catholic, Apostolic & Roman Church in Puerto Rico	Catholic
WLEO	1170 AM	Ponce	Uno Radio of Ponce, Inc.	Spanish
WLEY	1080 AM	Cayey	Media Power Group, Inc.	Spanish News/Talk
WLRP	1460 AM	San Sebastian	Las Raices Pepinianas, Inc.	Spanish Variety
WLUZ	88.5 FM	Levittown	La Gigante Siembra, Inc.	Spanish Religious
WLYM-LP	90.9 FM	Mayaguez	Feeding Homeless Corp.	Adult Contemporary
WMAA-LP	93.7 FM	Moca	Behind the Sound Corp.	Spanish Religious
WMDD	1480 AM	Fajardo	Pan Caribbean Broadcasting of PR, Inc.	Spanish Music
WMEG	106.9 FM	Guayama	WMEG Licensing, Inc.	Spanish and English Top 40/Contemporary
WMIA	1070 AM	Arecibo	Wifredo G. Blanco PI	Spanish
WMIO	102.3 FM	Cabo Rojo	Arso Radio Corp.	American CHR
WMLG	89.9 FM	Guayanilla	Caguas Educational TV, Inc.	Spanish Religious
WMNT	1500 AM	Manati	Manati Radio Corp.	Local Information/Music
WMSW	1120 AM	Hatillo	Aurora Broadcasting Corp.	News/Talk
WMTI	1160 AM	Barceloneta-Manati	Radio Borinquen, Inc.	Spanish Variety
WNEL	1430 AM	Caguas	Turabo Radio Corp.	Spanish News/Music
WNIK	1230 AM	Arecibo	Unik Broadcasting System Corp.	News/Talk
WNIK-FM	106.5 FM	Arecibo	Kelly Broadcasting System Corp.	CHR Spanish/English
WNNV	91.7 FM	San German	Siembra Fertil PR, Inc.	Spanish Religious
WNOD	94.1 FM	Mayagüez	Spanish Broadcasting System Holding Company, Inc.	Spanish/Reggaeton
WNRT	96.9 FM	Manati	La Voz Evangelica de Puerto Rico	Spanish Religious
WNVE	98.7 FM	Culebra	Western New Life, Inc.	Spanish Religious
WNVI	1040 AM	Moca	Aurio A. Matos Barreto	Religious Ministry
WNVM	97.7 FM	Cidra	New Life Broadcasting, Inc.	Spanish Religious
WODA	94.7 FM	Bayamon	Spanish Broadcasting System Holding Company, Inc.	Spanish/Reggaeton
WODB-LP	90.9 FM	Caguas	Iglesia Refugio, Sanidad y Adoración	Spanish Religious
WOIZ	1130 AM	Guayanilla	Radio Antillas of Harriet Broadcasters	Spanish Variety
WOLA	1380 AM	Barranquitas	Radio Procer, Inc.	Spanish Variety
WOQI	1020 AM	Adjuntas	Radio Casa Pueblo, Inc.	Community Radio
WORA	760 AM	Mayagüez	Arso Radio Corp.	Spanish News/Talk
WORO	92.5 FM	Corozal	Catholic, Apostolic & Roman Church in Puerto Rico	Catholic
WOSO	1030 AM	San Juan	Sherman Broadcasting Corp.	Silent
WOYE	97.3 FM	Rio Grande	AA Broadcast, Inc.	American CHR
WPAB	550 AM	Ponce	WPAB, Inc.	Spanish News/Talk
WPPC	1570 AM	Penuelas	Radio Felicidad, Inc.	Religious Ministry
WPRA	990 AM	Mayagüez	WPRA, Inc.	Local Information/Music
WPRM-FM	99.1 FM	San Juan	Arso Radio Corp.	Spanish CHR/Latino/Salsa
WPRP	910 AM	Ponce	Arso Radio Corp.	Spanish News/Talk
WPUC-FM	88.9 FM	Ponce	Pontifical Catholic University of Puerto Rico Service Association	Catholic
WQBS	870 AM	San Juan	AERCO Broadcasting Corp.	Spanish
WQBS-FM	107.7 FM	Carolina	International Broadcasting Corporation	Spanish CHR/Latino
WQHD-LP	91.1 FM	Aguada-Aguadilla	West Coast Broadcasting	Oldies
WQII	1140 AM	San Juan	Communications Counsel Group, Inc.	Spanish
WQML	101.5 FM	Ceiba	Caguas Educational TV, Inc.	Religious
WRIO	101.1 FM	Ponce	Arso Radio Corp.	Spanish/Salsa
WRRE	1460 AM	Juncos	Maranatha Radio Ministries	Spanish Religious
WRRH	106.1 FM	Hormigueros	Renacer Broadcasters Corp.	Spanish Religious
WRSJ	1520 AM	San Juan	International Broadcasting Corporation	News/Talk
WRSS	1410 AM	San Sebastian	Angel Vera-Maury	Spanish News/Talk
WRTU	89.7 FM	San Juan	University of Puerto Rico	Educational
WRUO	88.3 FM	Mayagüez	University of Puerto Rico	Educational
WRXD	96.5 FM	Fajardo	WRXD Licensing, Inc.	Spanish Contemporary Hit Radio
WSKN	1320 AM	San Juan	Media Power Group, Inc.	Spanish News/Talk
WSOL	1090 AM	San German	San German Broadcasters Group	Spanish Variety
WTIL	1300 AM	Mayagüez	Wifredo G. Blanco PI	Spanish News/Talk
WTOK-FM	102.5 FM	San Juan	WIAC-FM, Inc.	American CHR
WTPM	92.9 FM	Aguadilla	Corp. of the Seventh Day Adventists of West PR	Religious Ministry
WUKQ	1420 AM	Ponce	WLII/WSUR License Partnership, G.P.	Spanish News/Talk
WUKQ-FM	98.7 FM	Mayagüez	WLII/WSUR License Partnership, G.P.	Spanish and English Contemporary (CHR)
WUNO	630 AM	San Juan	Arso Radio Corp.	Spanish News & Talk
WUPR	1530 AM	Utuado	Central Broadcasting Corp.	Spanish Variety
WVID	90.3 FM	Añasco	Centro Colegial Cristiano, Inc.	Jazz
WVIS	106.1 FM	Vieques	V.I. Stereo Communications Corporation (PR)	American CHR
WVJP	1110 AM	Caguas	Borinquen Broadcasting Co, Inc.	
WVJP-FM	103.3 FM	Caguas	Borinquen Broadcasting Co, Inc.	Spanish CHR/Latino
WVOZ	1580 AM	Aguadilla	Wifredo G. Blanco PI	Spanish News/Talk
WVPJ-LP	107.9 FM	Mayaguez	Iglesia Evangelica Sion, Inc.	Religious Ministry
WWNA	1340 AM	Aguadilla	DBS Radio, Inc.	Spanish Variety
WXEW	840 AM	Yabucoa	WXEW Radio Victoria, Inc.	Spanish News/Talk
WXHD	98.1 FM	Santa Isabel	Amor Radio Group Corp.	Spanish CHR/Latino
WXLX	103.7 FM	Lajas	Radio X Broadcasting Corp.	Spanish CHR/Latino
WXRF	1590 AM	Guayama	Wifredo G. Blanco PI	Spanish News/Talk
WXYX	100.7 FM	Bayamon	Raad Broadcasting Corp.	Spanish CHR/Latino
WYAC	930 AM	Cabo Rojo	Bestov Broadcasting, Inc.	Spanish News/Talk
WYAS	92.1 FM	Luquillo	Radio Sol 92 WZOL, Inc.	Spanish Religious
WYEL	600 AM	Mayagüez	WLII/WSUR License Partnership, G.P.	Spanish News/Talk
WYKO	880 AM	Sabana Grande	Juan Galiano Rivera	Spanish Variety
WYKQ-LP	107.9 FM	Aguadilla-Aguada	Taller Cultural Jaycoa, Inc.	Educational
WYQE	92.9 FM	Naguabo	Fajardo Broadcasting Co, Inc.	Spanish Variety
WZAR	101.9 FM	Ponce	Uno Radio of Ponce, Inc.	Spanish Adult Contemporary
WZCA	91.7 FM	Quebradillas	La Gigante Siembra, Inc.	Religious Ministry
WZCL-LP	98.1 FM	Cabo Rojo	Clubradio PR Community, Inc.	Spanish Adult Contemporary
WZET	92.1 FM	Hormigueros	International Broadcasting Corporation	Spanish CHR/Latino
WZFE-LP	98.3 FM	Moca	Concilio de Iglesias Rios de Vida, Inc.	Religious Ministry
WZMT	93.3 FM	Ponce	Spanish Broadcasting System Holding Company, Inc.	Spanish/Salsa
WZNT	93.7 FM	San Juan	Spanish Broadcasting System Holding Company, Inc.	Spanish/Salsa
WZOL	98.3 FM	Las Piedras	Radio Sol 92, WZOL, Inc.	Religious Ministry

== Television stations ==
- WKAQ-TV
- WORA-TV
- WAPA-TV
- WTIN-TV
- WNJX-TV
- WIPR-TV
- WIPM-TV
- WSTE-DT
- WLII-DT
- WSUR-DT
- WOLE-DT
- WORO-DT
- WJPX
- WIRS
- WKPV
- WJWN-TV
- WSJP-LD
- WTCV
- WVOZ-TV
- WVEO
- WMTJ
- WQTO
- WIDP
- WSJN-CD
- WQSJ-CD
- WELU
- WVQS-LD
- WRFB
- WUJA
- WZNA-LD
- WQHA
- WVDO-LD
- WNTE-LD
- WUSP-LD
- WOST
- WWKQ-LD
- WQQZ-CD

== Television stars ==
- Rita Moreno
- Osvaldo Ríos
- Roselyn Sánchez
- Carlos Ponce
- Luis Guzmán
- Amaury Nolasco
- Giselle Blondet
- Zuleyka Rivera
- Jessie Camacho
- Paula Miranda
- Luis Roberto Guzmán
- Don Omar
- David Zayas
- Ramon Rodriguez
- Paul Calderón
- Joyce Giraud
- Armando Riesco
- Shalim Ortiz
- Maria Celeste Arraras
- Jaslene Gonzalez
- Barbara Bermudo

== See also ==
- Puerto Rican literature
- Media of the United States
- Journalism in Puerto Rico
- Freedom of the press in Puerto Rico

== Bibliography ==
=== in English ===
- "United States AM Stations: Puerto Rico", Yearbook of Radio and Television, New York: Radio Television Daily, 1964, OCLC 7469377 – via Internet Archive + FM Stations on the Air: Puerto Rico
- Federico A. Subervi-Vélez; et al. (1990). "Mass Media in Puerto Rico". In Stuart H. Surlin; Walter C. Soderlund (eds.). Mass Media and the Caribbean. New York: Gordon and Breach. pp. 149–176. ISBN 978-2-88124-447-6.
- FCC AM Query Results for Puerto Rico
- FCC FM Query Results for Puerto Rico

=== in Spanish ===
- Pedro Luis Perea Roselló (1962), Los periódicos y los periodistas de Mayagüez (in Spanish), Ponce: Ediciones Aldecoa, OCLC 912547459
- Pablo Tirado Mercado (1974), Anatomía del periodismo puertorriqueño (in Spanish), Mexico: B. Costa-Amic, OCLC 2585609
- Robert Anderson; Gustavo Marrero Irizarry (1977), La Prensa en Puerto Rico (in Spanish), San Juan: Comision de Derechos Civiles, OCLC 22129637 (About freedom of the press)
- José A. Romeu (1985). Panorama del periodismo puertorriqueño (in Spanish). Universidad de Puerto Rico. ISBN 0847700674.
- El Periodismo en Puerto Rico: reflexiones, reseñas y ensayos (in Spanish), Interamerican University of Puerto Rico, 1987, ISBN 0934369526
- Asociación de Periodistas de Puerto Rico, ed. (2006). Dos siglos de periodismo puertorriqueño (in Spanish). Vol. 2. San Juan: Casa de Periodistas Editorial. ISBN 0974310212. (Essays)
- Lourdes Lugo-Ortiz (2011). "Valores y motivaciones profesionales: los periodistas en Puerto Rico en la era digital" [Professional Values and Motivations: Puerto Rican Journalists in the Digital Age]. Estudios Sobre el Mensaje Periodistico (in Spanish). 17. Universidad Complutense de Madrid. ISSN 1134-1629.
- Rafael Matos; Arturo Yépez, eds. (2014). La noticia y yo: nuestros periodistas y sus memorias (in Spanish). San Juan: Editorial Universidad de Puerto Rico. ISBN 9780847716265. (Covers 1930s-1980s)
- Historia de la radio en Puerto Rico
- La Radioafición en Puerto Rico
- La radio y sus oyentes durante el huracán María: un reexamen de la relación medio-audiencia en situaciones de desastres
- WAPA Radio "abrazó" a Puerto Rico en el peor momento de María
