= News media in Puerto Rico =

Mass media are the means through which information is transmitted to a large audience. This includes newspapers, television, radio, and more recently the Internet. Organizations that provide news through mass media in Puerto Rico are collectively known as the news media in Puerto Rico.

== History ==
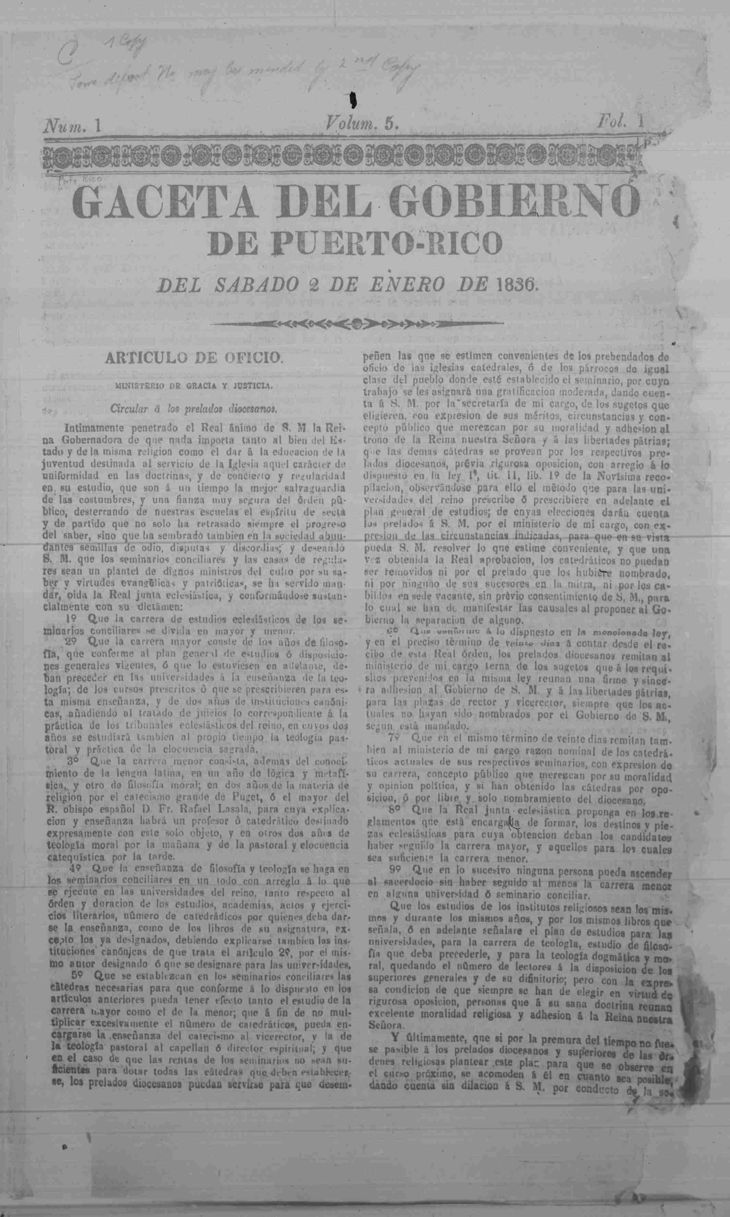
Front page of "La Gaceta de Puerto Rico" in January 1836

News media in Puerto Rico can be traced back to the establishment of Spanish colonial rule and the introduction of a Spanish-led government. Captain General, Toribio Montes established a printing press at the Spanish government's headquarters and began publishing "La Gaceta del Gobierno de Puerto Rico. The newspaper would be published twice a week (Wednesdays and Saturdays) and would cost 1 Spanish dollar. Through the 1800s several newspapers began publication including "Diario Economico de Puerto Rico, "El Cigarrón, El Investigador, and "Diario Liberal y de Variedades de Puerto Rico the former being the first one to be published daily. Most newspapers were being published out of the capital city of San Juan. The western city of Mayagüez became the first city to have its own newspaper in the island. "El Imparcial" began publishing in 1848 but was quickly shut down by the Spanish government because it included articles criticizing them.

In 1909, El Diario de Puerto Rico (Puerto Rico's Diary) was founded in the city of Ponce, Puerto Rico by Guillermo V. Cintron. By 1911 the newspaper had changed its name to El Día (The Day), a name that remained for over 70 years. In 1945, El Día was sold to Luis A. Ferré. When Ferré was elected governor of Puerto Rico in 1968, he sold the paper to his son Antonio Luis Ferré, who moved the paper's headquarters from Ponce to the capital San Juan, Puerto Rico and changed the newspaper's name to El Nuevo Día. On November 17, 1997, the Ferré-Rangel Family launched a secondary newspaper known as Primera Hora, the paper's mission was to deliver the news in a more laid back mode as opposed to the hard hitting journalism that could be found in El Nuevo Dia, while it started with a price of 25 cents, Primera Hora is now distributed free in Puerto Rico and through its website. In 2011, The Ferré-Rangel family created GFR Media (Grupo Ferré-Rangel Media) a holdings company that administers El Nuevo Dia, Primera Hora, Shop.PR, Clasificados PR, and Oferta del Dia.

In 1919, Romualdo Real founded "El Mundo" (The World) which quickly became a national newspaper with a wider audience. In 1929 Angel Ramos and journalist José Coll Vidal bought "El Mundo" and in 1944 Ramos acquired sole ownership of the newspaper. In 1922, Puerto Rico received its first radio station WKAQ-AM which focused on a talk radio and news format.

In 1952, Ramos acquired WKAQ-AM and met with governor Luis Muñoz Marín to express his intention on creating the first ever media conglomerate in the island. The agreement between Ramos and Marín stated that Empresas El Mundo Broadcasting would be allowed to use the services of Engineer Rafael Delgado Márquez, who was the administrator of Authority of Communications of Puerto Rico, to develop the first commercial station in Puerto Rico WKAQ-TV however due to the FCC freeze of 1948 the development of the station was held back until 1954. On March 28, 1954, at 6:45 p.m. WKAQ-TV started broadcasting the first ever newscast in the history of the island "Telenoticias" anchored by Evelio Otero. Otero served as anchored and producer of "Telenoticias" until 1962, he became known for editorializing on the stories presented and for translating stories in English received from American news outlets. In 1962, ahead of the arrival of colored television, El Mundo Enterprises decided on moving their headquarters to a new state of the art facility in Hato Rey. The new headquarters would become Puerto Rico's first ever communications building housing the operations of WKAQ-TV, WKAQ-AM and the newspaper El Mundo. Currently the building still houses the studios for WKAQ-TV however the radio operations have moved to Guaynabo and the newspaper operations have shut down.

WAPA-TV would begin broadcasting in March 1954 but it was not until 1967 that the network aired its first newscast. Evelio Otero moved from WKAQ-TV to anchor the new newscast called ''Noticentro'' (NewsCenter), Otero remained as the sole news anchor for NotiCentro until 1980 when he left the station and was replaced by Guillermo José Torres who would set the Guinness World Records as the anchorman with the longest career in the same station after 43 years. In September 2023, WAPA's owners finalized a deal to acquire WKAQ-AM and WKAQ-FM, launching their new venture called WAPA Media.

Guillermo Jose Torres (pictured) anchored Noticentro for over 40 years

In 1974, El Vocero began publishing as a newspaper. Founded by journalist and economist Gaspar Roca El Vocero looked to become a crime oriented tabloid, however in the late 1980s after the closing of El Mundo, El Vocero looked to become a mainstream newspaper by adding legitimate news articles and well known columnists. In April 2007, Roca died and his son Miguel Roca took over leadership of El Vocero. The newspaper would declare bankruptcy in December 2013. After its bankruptcy El Vocero was bought by a local group of entrepreneurs under the name Publi-Inversiones. El Vocero would relaunch in 2014 as a free newspaper a practice that was later adopted by competitor GFR Media with their Primera Hora newspaper.

In 1976, WLII-DT doing business as Telecadena Perez Perry launched their news segments called Un minuto en las noticias (A minute in the news) hosted by Annie Alfaro, and later Braulio Castillo Jr. the segments were short in length and highlighted the day's most important stories. Later in a joint venture with WSTE-DT (then known WLUZ) they presented the news magazine, Camara 7. In 1986 WLII launched their official newscast known as Las Noticias (The News). WLII-DT was later sold to Univision in 2002 and the newscast was dubbed Las Noticias Univision to reflect the change. On October 17, 2014, Univision announced that Jaime Bauzá was ascending his position to senior vice-president and general manager of all of the network's operations in Puerto Rico. The first change he made was the firing of 109 employees. This caused the closing of the entire news department, including reporters, anchors, cameramen, etc. On that day, the morning show Tu Mañana was shown normally, but after that, the midday show Tu Mediodia wasn't shown. Instead, a Mexican drama was shown. During that time, reporter Daisy Sánchez published on her Twitter account the announcing of the news department's closing.

On February 18, 2021, TeleOnce hired José Enrique "Kike" Cruz, who was news director at WAPA-TV for 32 years and who worked at the station from 1976 until his retirement in 2018 as an adviser for the revamped news department after more than six years without newscasts. On April 14, 2021, TeleOnce hired Jenny Suarez, a former news producer at WAPA-TV, as its vice-president of the revamped news department.

On June 7, 2021, WLII-DT confirmed their intentions to relaunch their newscasts with the new telecast set to premiere in late July/early August 2021 in the 5 p.m. slot. Celimar Adames Casalduc (who anchored WAPA-TV's NotiCentro for 18 years) would join TeleOnce as the lead anchor for the newscast and Deborah Martorell (who served as WAPA-TV's Chief Meteorologist for 27 years) would also be joining as TeleOnce's Chief Meteorologist. Nuria Sebazco (who previously hosted TeleOnce's morning newscast Tu Mañana) was also announced to be returning to the network (migrating from WKAQ-TV) and Tatiana Ortiz (also from WKAQ) was also announced as on air talent. On June 8, 2021, WLII-DT announced that Ricardo Currás (formerly of WKAQ-TV and who anchored morning newscasts from Univision O&O WXTV-DT), would join Adames as co-anchor.

Ricardo Currás and Celimar Adames close out the premiere broadcast of the Las Noticias revival in 2021

On June 23, 2021, WLII-DT announced that their relaunched newscast would be called Las Noticias TeleOnce thus reviving the original brand that ran for almost 30 years. Las Noticias TeleOnce premiered on July 12, 2021, with three editions: Las Noticias: Ahora (The News: Now) at 3:55 p.m., Las Noticias: Prime (The News: Prime) at 4:55 p.m. and Las Noticias: Última Edición (The News: Final Edition) at 10:00 p.m. All three editions will be anchored by Adames and Currás and will feature Martorell on the weather and Luis Joel Aymat (who anchored the former Edicion Puerto Rico newscast) in sports.

In 1958, WIPR-TV was launched as a non-commercial public television station owned by the government of Puerto Rico and operated through the Puerto Rico Public Broadcasting Corporation but it wasn't until 1995 when the station would launch their own news operation called NotiSeis (News Six). The newscast was anchored by Gloria Soltero and Pedro Luis Garcia. Currently the newscast carries the name Notiseis 360.

Other media ventures in Puerto Rico include The San Juan Star, Metro Newspaper, Claridad, Caribbean Business, NotiCel and a series of regional papers such as Vision, La Calle, Jornada PR, among others.

== Structure ==
=== Public Sector ===
The Puerto Rico Public Broadcasting Corporation owns and operates two stations WIPR-TV channel 6 in San Juan and WIPM-TV channel 3 in Mayagüez, Puerto Rico. Both channels operate under the name Puerto Rico TV and feature a mix of locally produced programming and PBS programming from the United States. The company also operates a streaming app called PRTV+ which features episodes of their locally produced shows as well as their newscast Notiseis 360.

On radio the PRBC operates WIPR (AM) which is a talk based radio station and WIPR-FM which rebroadcasts NPR programming.

=== Private Sector ===
==== Telemundo de Puerto Rico ====
Since 2005, NBCUniversal has owned and operated WKAQ-TV (presented as Telemundo) and its sub channels which include Punto 2 and NBC Puerto Rico (a repeater of WNBC).

==== WAPA Media ====
Holdings include WAPA-TV, WAPA Deportes (WAPA Sports), WAPA América, WKAQ-AM and WKAQ-FM (known as KQ-105).

==== Liberman Media Group ====
Holdings include WLII-DT, WOLE-DT, WSUR-DT and W21CX-D.

==== GFR Media ====
Holdings include El Nuevo Día and Primera Hora.

==== UNO Radio Group ====
Holdings include WUNO, WPRP, WORA (AM), WNEL, WFID, Cadena Salsoul, WTOK-FM, WCMN-FM and WMIO

==== Borinquen Radio (Wapa Radio Group) ====
Holdings include WBQN, WAPA (AM) , WTIL, WXRF, WVOZ (AM), WMTI (AM) and WMIA (AM)

==== Spanish Broadcasting System ====
Holdings in Puerto Rico include WMEG, WRXD, WZNT, WODA and Mega TV

==== Red Informativa de Puerto Rico ====
Holdings include WKUM, WUPR, WEXS, WGDL, WMAA-LP and WMDD
