= Toca de to =

Toca de to can refer to:

- WTOK-FM, a radio station at 102.5 FM licensed to San Juan, Puerto Rico
- WCMN-FM, a radio station at 107.3 FM licensed to Arecibo, Puerto Rico
- WMIO, a radio station at 102.3 FM licensed to Cabo Rojo, Puerto Rico
