= WCMN =

WCMN can refer to:

- WCMN (AM), a radio station (1280 AM) licensed to serve Arecibo, Puerto Rico
- WCMN-FM, a radio station (107.3 FM) licensed to serve Arecibo, Puerto Rico
- WCMN-LD, a low-power television station (channel 14, virtual 13) licensed to serve St. Cloud–Sartell, Minnesota, United States
- Acronym for The West China Missionary News
