= WORA =

WORA may mean:

- WORA (AM), a radio station (760 AM) licensed to Mayagüez, Puerto Rico
- WORA-TV, a television station (channel 5) licensed to Mayagüez, Puerto Rico
- Write once, run anywhere (WORA), a slogan used by Sun Microsystems
