= WPRM =

WPRM may refer to:

- WPRM-FM, a radio station in Puerto Rico operated by Cadena Salsoul
- Western Pacific Railroad Museum, a museum in Portola, California, United States
- Worker-Peasant Red Guards, also translated as Workers and Peasants' Red Militia, North Korean paramilitary force
