= WTOK =

WTOK can refer to:

- WTOK-FM, a radio station at 102.5 FM licensed to San Juan, Puerto Rico.
- WTOK-TV, a television station (channel 13, virtual 11) licensed to serve Meridian, Mississippi.
