= WPRP =

Radio station in Ponce, Puerto Rico

Ponce, Puerto Rico; Puerto Rico
- Broadcast area: Puerto Rico area
- Frequency: 910 kHz
- Branding: Noti Uno Sur

Programming
- Format: News
- Affiliations: iHeartMedia

Ownership
- Owner: Uno Radio Group; (Arso Radio Corporation)
- Sister stations: WCMN, WCMN-FM, WORA, WUNO, WFID, WZAR, WFDT, WPRM, WIVA-FM, WRIO, WTOK-FM, WMIO, WNEL

History
- First air date: May 30, 1936; 89 years ago
- Call sign meaning: Primera Radioemisora Ponceña

Technical information
- Licensing authority: FCC
- Facility ID: 54475
- Class: B
- Power: 4,250 watts
- Transmitter coordinates: 17°18′59.1″N 66°36′50.4″W
- Translator: 95.5 W238DH (Ponce)

Links
- Public license information: Public file; LMS
- Webcast: Listen live (via iHeartRadio)
- Website: notiuno.com

WPRP (910 AM) is a radio station broadcasting a News radio format. Licensed to Ponce, Puerto Rico, the station serves the Puerto Rico area. The station is currently owned by Arso Radio Corporation. The station is shared with translator station W238DH 95.5 FM also located in Ponce.

== History ==
The station was the first one to operate in southern Puerto Rico. It was owned and operated by Julio M. Conesa, an electrical engineer who designed and built the radio station's equipment himself. Its building, still standing on PR-2, was the first radio station building in Puerto Rico to be built specifically for that purpose. Julius H. Conesa Braun, son of Julio Mariano Conesa Renovales in 1955 organized Ponce Broadcasting Corporation with friend Charlie Cordero and built four radio stations WLEO, Ponce; WKFE, Yauco; WLEY, Cayey and WLEO-FM later named WZAR. In 1969, Julio H. Conesa Garcia started working with PBC in marketing and management. Also, Carlos M. Conesa Garcia, his brother and eventually Julio's daughter Teresita Conesa Risco. Julio H. Conesa Garcia along with Ricardo Hermida, David Ortiz Cintron and Byron Mitchell organized the largest Radio News Network in Puerto Rico, known as Radio Cadena Noticiosa, later Cadena Ultima Hora and finally as NOTI-UNO. Julio H. Conesa acquired for PBC, WZBS-AM in Ponce changing the call letters to WZUR. When Julius H. Conesa Braun died, Julio H. Conesa Garcia remained managing PBC until 1998. A series of disagreements and acts of treason from within marked the eventual sale of Ponce Broadcasting to Arso Radio Corp. months later.

== Translator stations ==
Broadcast translator for WPRP
Call sign	Frequency	City of license	FID	ERP (W)	FCC info
W238DH	95.5 FM	Ponce, Puerto Rico	203175	250	LMS
