= KEAD =

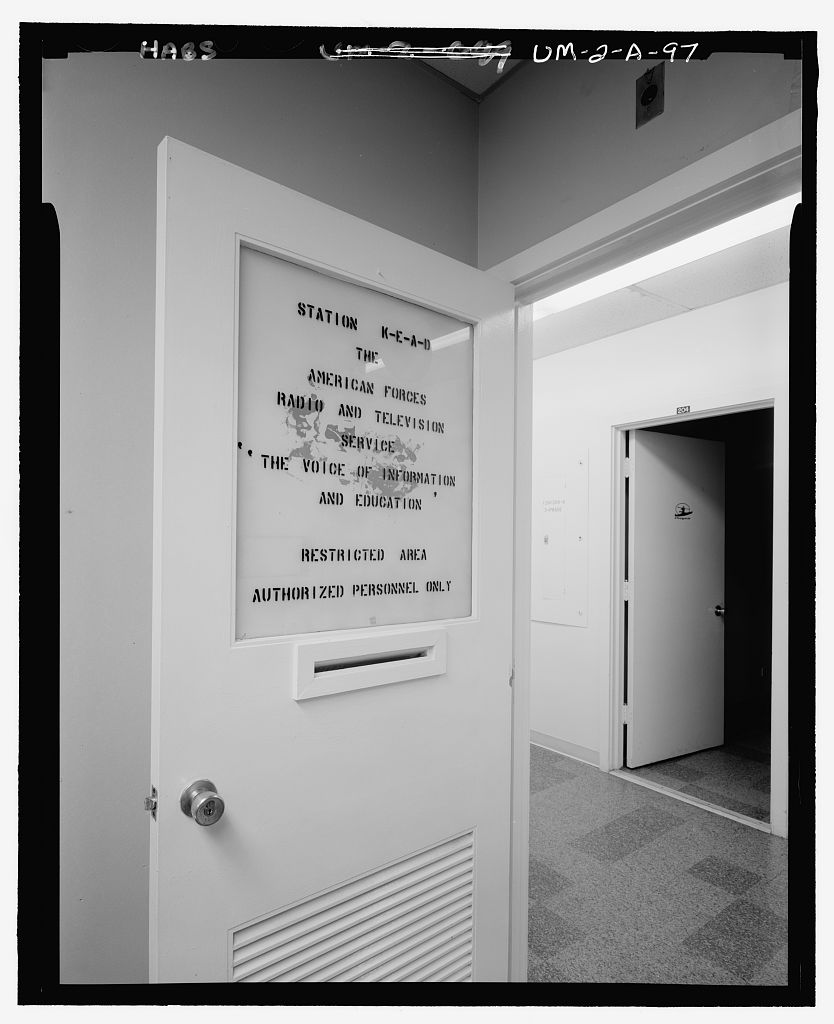

United States
- Broadcast area: Wake Island
- Frequency: 1490 kHz

Programming
- Format: Free-form

Ownership
- Owner: Armed Forces Radio and Television Services

History
- First air date: before February 1969

Technical information
- Licensing authority: FCC
- Power: 500 watts
- Transmitter coordinates: 19°17′N 166°39′E

Links
- Public license information: Public file; LMS

KEAD was the callsign for two defunct American Forces Radio and Television Service radio stations on Wake Island, an unorganized, unincorporated territory of the United States.

== Info ==
On 1490 kHz AM, the station carried a mix of free-form live programming hosted by military personnel and other workers stationed on the island, while on KEAD-FM 104.5 MHz, the station played pre-recorded easy-listening music off reel-to-reel tapes. The KEAD callsign was previously assigned to the Civil Aeronautics Authority navigation service station based on the island.

== Recent discoveries ==
In 2011, some 9,000 vintage vinyl records provided by AFRTS to the station from the mid-1960s into the 1970s were discovered in the old studio in a restricted area of the Wake Island Airfield terminal building.
