= Primera Hora (Puerto Rico) =

Puerto Rican newspaper

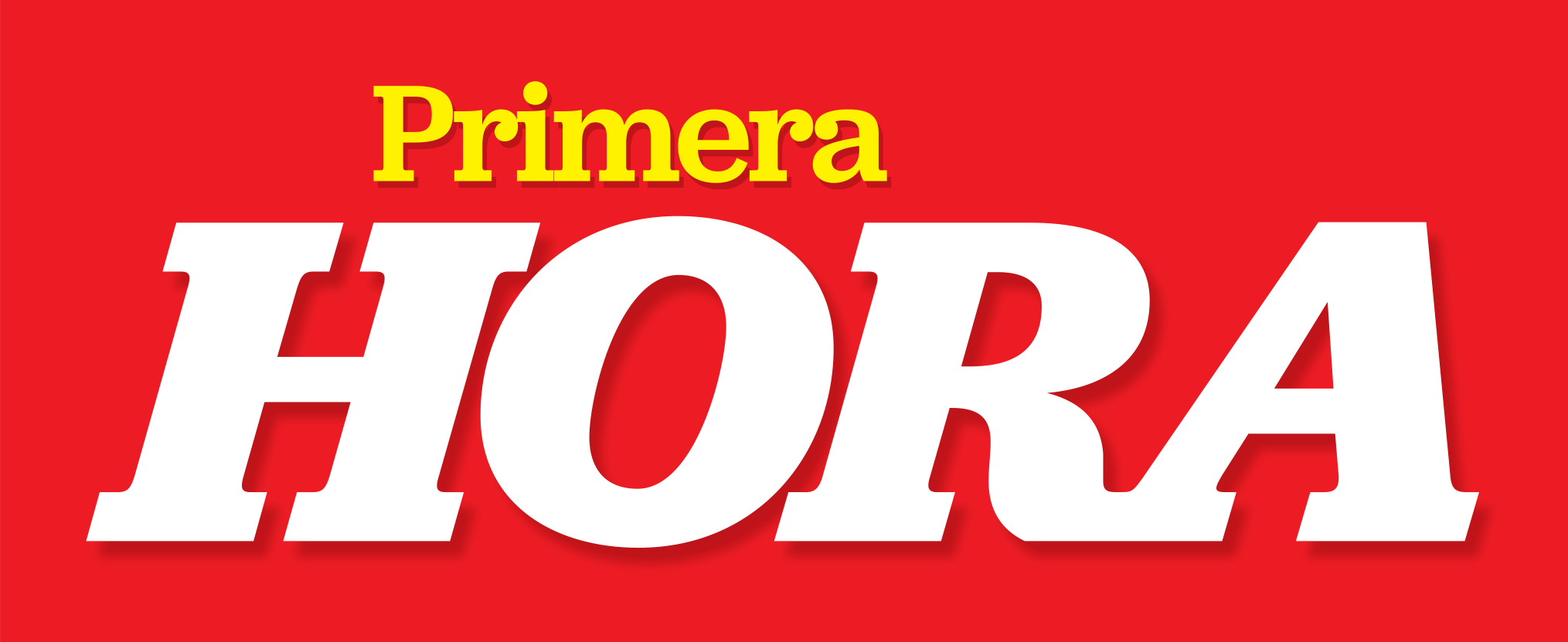
- Type: Daily newspaper
- Format: Tabloid (digital only)
- Owner: Grupo Ferré-Rangel (GFR Media)
- Founder(s): Carlos Nido; Héctor Olave
- President: Yalixa Rivera Cruz
- Founded: 1997
- Language: Spanish
- Headquarters: Guaynabo, Puerto Rico
- Website: primerahora.com

Primera Hora is an online daily newspaper doing coverage in Puerto Rico. Primera Hora was founded in 1997, and is a subsidiary of GFR Media. It is headquartered in Guaynabo, Puerto Rico.

== History ==
It was established on November 17, 1997, by Carlos Nido and Héctor Olave. Distributed free of charge through a print edition from Monday to Friday, readers can get Primera Hora through subscription, in establishments and at traffic lights throughout the island. Reaching more than 200,000 people with its regionalized distribution, Primerahora.com is also the second most visited local news website in Puerto Rico.

Primera Hora also fleshed out questions raised by Puerto Rican politicians in 2002, by publishing research findings and even conducting its own research during a national controversy over reggaeton music and perreo, a popular dance move associated with reggaeton. Primera Hora conducted its minor survey on how dancing perreo to reggaeton music affects youth, specifically young women in Puerto Rico.

As of September 24 of 2026, it has discontinued its print edition, becoming digital-only.

As of 2026, Primera Hora is published by GFR Media.
