= WHOY =

Salinas, Puerto Rico; Puerto Rico
- Broadcast area: Puerto Rico area
- Frequency: 1210 kHz
- Branding: Radio Hoy

Programming
- Format: Spanish variety format

Ownership
- Owner: Martin Colon; (Colon Radio Corporation)

History
- First air date: May 16, 1967; 58 years ago

Technical information
- Licensing authority: FCC
- Facility ID: 29229
- Class: B
- ERP: 5,000 watts
- Transmitter coordinates: 17°58′38.00″N 66°18′14.00″W

Links
- Public license information: Public file; LMS
- Website: radiowhoy.com

WHOY (1210 AM) is a radio station broadcasting a Spanish variety format. It is licensed to Salinas, Puerto Rico, United States, and it serves the Puerto Rico area. The station is owned by Martin Colon and its licensee is held by Colon Radio Corporation.
