= WENA =

Radio station in Yauco, Puerto Rico

Yauco, Puerto Rico; Puerto Rico
- Broadcast area: Puerto Rico area
- Frequency: 1330 kHz
- Branding: La Buena 1330

Programming
- Format: Variety

Ownership
- Owner: Southern Broadcasting Corporation; (Broadcasting Network of Puerto Rico)

History
- First air date: February 6, 1979
- Call sign meaning: La BuENA

Technical information
- Licensing authority: FCC
- Facility ID: 61257
- Class: B
- Power: 2,000 watts day 1,400 watts night
- Transmitter coordinates: 18°2′4.00″N 66°51′48.00″W

Links
- Public license information: Public file; LMS
- Website: labuena1330am.com

WENA (1330 AM) is a radio station broadcasting a Variety format. It is licensed to Yauco, Puerto Rico, and serves the Puerto Rico area. The station is owned by Southern Broadcasting Corporation.
