= WXEW =

Yabucoa, Puerto Rico; Puerto Rico
- Frequency: 840 kHz
- Branding: Victoria 840

Programming
- Format: Spanish Variety
- Affiliations: CyberNews

Ownership
- Owner: WXEW Radio Victoria, Inc.; (Calderon Family)

History
- First air date: May 11, 1975

Technical information
- Licensing authority: FCC
- Facility ID: 74206
- Class: B
- Power: 5,000 watts day 1,000 watts night
- Transmitter coordinates: 18°02′58″N 65°52′07″W

Links
- Public license information: Public file; LMS
- Website: victoria840.com

WXEW (840 AM, "Victoria 840") is a radio station licensed to serve Yabucoa, Puerto Rico. The station is owned by WXEW Radio Victoria, Inc. It airs a Spanish Variety format.

The station was assigned the WXEW call letters by the Federal Communications Commission.

== Logos ==
Former WXEW logo.
