= WOLA (AM) =

Barranquitas, Puerto Rico; Puerto Rico
- Broadcast area: Puerto Rico
- Frequency: 1380 kHz
- Branding: Radio Procer

Programming
- Format: Spanish Adult Contemporary

Ownership
- Owner: Centro Media Group; (Radio Procer Inc.)

History
- First air date: 1976
- Former call signs: WEAH (1976-1983)

Technical information
- Licensing authority: FCC
- Facility ID: 67343
- Class: B
- ERP: 1,000 watts unlimited
- Transmitter coordinates: 18°11′1.00″N 66°18′24.00″W
- Translator: 98.5 W253DB (Barranquitas)

Links
- Public license information: Public file; LMS

WOLA (1380 kHz) is an AM radio station broadcasting a Spanish adult contemporary format. Licensed to Barranquitas, Puerto Rico, the station serves the Puerto Rico area. The station is currently owned by Centro Media Group, through licensee Radio Procer, Inc.

== History ==
The station went on the air as WEAH on February 23, 1976. On October 24, 1983, the station changed its call sign to the current WOLA.

== Translator stations ==
Broadcast translator for WOLA
Call sign	Frequency	City of license	FID	ERP (W)	FCC info
W253DB	98.5 FM	Barranquitas, Puerto Rico	202068	.022	LMS
