= WJVP =

Culebra, Puerto Rico; Puerto Rico
- Broadcast area: Puerto Rico
- Frequency: 89.3 MHz
- Branding: Radio Kodesh

Programming
- Format: Religious

Ownership
- Owner: Rev. Elizabeth Ortiz Valle; (Tabernaculo de Santidad Inc.)

History
- First air date: February 19, 1996; 30 years ago

Technical information
- Licensing authority: FCC
- Facility ID: 11619
- Class: B
- ERP: 50,000 watts
- HAAT: 174.0 meters (570.9 ft)
- Transmitter coordinates: 18°19′37.00″N 65°18′21.00″W

Links
- Public license information: Public file; LMS

WJVP (89.3 FM, Radio Kodesh) is a radio station broadcasting a Christian radio format. It is licensed to Culebra, Puerto Rico, and serves the Puerto Rico area. The station is owned by Rev. Elizabeth Ortiz Valle, licensed to Tabernaculo de Santidad Inc.

From its station's beginnings in 1996 until 2018, WJVP was owned by Jorge Raschke and was licensed to Clamor Broadcasting Network. CBN now operates as an online radio station.

On August 16, 2017, WJVP has filed for an STA to operate at a temporary site with reduced power after losing its lease; the station claims that other tenants blamed it for the smell of its diesel generator, and that a bullet was fired into the transmitter building and acid thrown at the guy lines. On August 25, after one year off the air, WJVP resumes broadcasting with reduced power.

On August 23, 2018, Tabernaculo de Santidad Inc. filed a $1,000 deal to purchase WJVP from Clamor Broadcasting Network. The sale was consummated on November 5, 2018.
