= WCMN (AM) =

Arecibo, Puerto Rico; Puerto Rico
- Frequency: 1280 kHz
- Branding: Noti Uno 1280

Programming
- Format: News
- Affiliations: CNN Radio iHeartMedia

Ownership
- Owner: Uno Radio Group; (Caribbean Broadcasting Corporation)
- Sister stations: WUNO, WPRP, WORA, WNEL, WFID, WZAR, WFDT, WPRM-FM, WIVA-FM, WRIO, WTOK-FM, WCMN-FM, WMIO

History
- First air date: September 15, 1947
- Call sign meaning: Carlos Esteva Mercedes Esteva Norte (station founders and station location on the island)

Technical information
- Licensing authority: FCC
- Facility ID: 8792
- Class: B
- Power: 5,000 watts day 1,000 watts night
- Transmitter coordinates: 18°28′52.00″N 66°41′16.00″W
- Translator: 92.1 W221ER (Arecibo)

Links
- Public license information: Public file; LMS
- Webcast: Listen live (via iHeartRadio)
- Website: http://notiuno.com

WCMN (1280 kHz, "Noti Uno Norte") is an AM radio station broadcasting a news radio format. Licensed to Arecibo, Puerto Rico. The station is currently owned by Caribbean Broadcasting Corporation. The station is shared with translator station W221ER 92.1 FM also located in Arecibo.

== Translator stations ==
Broadcast translator for WCMN
Call sign	Frequency	City of license	FID	ERP (W)	FCC info
W221ER	92.1 FM	Arecibo, Puerto Rico	203172	.001	LMS
