= WCXQ-LP =

- Isabela-Camuy, Puerto Rico; Puerto Rico
- Frequency: 98.1 MHz
- Branding: Top 98.1

Programming
- Format: Contemporary hit radio
- Affiliations: Red Informativa de PR

Ownership
- Owner: Community Action Corp.

History
- First air date: July 2014

Technical information
- Licensing authority: FCC
- Facility ID: 194659
- Class: L1
- Power: 100 watts
- Transmitter coordinates: 18°28′40.34″N 67°0′20.52″W
- Translator: VCJ-AMTX200 1690 kHz (Aguadilla)

Links
- Public license information: LMS
- Website: www.topradio98.tv

WCXQ-LP (98.1 FM, Top 98.1) is a radio station broadcasting a CHR format. Licensed to Isabela-Camuy, Puerto Rico, the station serves the northern and western Puerto Rico area. The station is currently owned by Community Action Corporation.
