= WQHD-LP =

- Aguada-Aguadilla, Puerto Rico; Puerto Rico
- Frequency: 91.1 MHz
- Branding: Super Q

Programming
- Format: Spanish Tropical

Ownership
- Owner: West Coast Broadcasting

History
- First air date: July 2014; 11 years ago
- Former call signs: WCHQ-LP (2014); WWOY-LP (2014–2017)
- Former frequencies: 94.5 MHz (2014–2019); 90.7 MHz (2019–2023)

Technical information
- Licensing authority: FCC
- Facility ID: 194408
- Class: L1
- ERP: 12 watts
- HAAT: 85.0 meters (278.9 ft)
- Transmitter coordinates: 18°21′8.70″N 67°11′32.40″W

Links
- Public license information: LMS
- Website: superq91.com

WQHD-LP (91.1 FM, Super Q) is a radio station broadcasting a Spanish Tropical format. Licensed to Aguada-Aguadilla, Puerto Rico, the station serves the western Puerto Rico area. The station is currently owned by West Coast Broadcasting.
