= WAEL-FM =

- Maricao, Puerto Rico; Puerto Rico
- Broadcast area: Mayaguez, Puerto Rico
- Frequency: 96.1 MHz
- Branding: FM96

Programming
- Format: Spanish CHR

Ownership
- Owner: WAEL, Inc.; (Pirallo-Lopez Family)

History
- First air date: 1972; 54 years ago

Technical information
- Licensing authority: FCC
- Facility ID: 70685
- Class: B
- ERP: 24,000 watts
- HAAT: 855.0 meters (2,805.1 ft)
- Transmitter coordinates: 18°59′57″N 66°59′15″W

Links
- Public license information: Public file; LMS
- Website: fm96puertorico.com

WAEL-FM (96.1 MHz), branded on-air as FM96, is a radio station with offices and studios in Mayaguez, Puerto Rico, covers the western half of the island. Transmitter and tower at Monte del Estado Maricao, Puerto Rico. On air since early 1970s.

== Ownership ==
WAEL-FM is owned and operated by WAEL, Inc. a Puerto Rican company founded in 1957 by the Pirallo-Lopez family, studios at De Diego 3 este Mayaguez, Puerto Rico.

Telephone office 787-832-4560 and 787-834-4696 on air.

== Programming ==
Spanish hits like Merengue, Salsa, Baladas, Bachatas, Rock en Espanol.

- 6 am to 10 am La Movida con Elvin Seguinot
- 10 am to 3 pm Jose Mendez
- 11 am to 1 pm La Hora del Comelon con Rousty y Jose Mendez "El Bandido"
- 3 pm to 7 pm Bumper to Bumper con Juan Carlos "The Boss"
- 8 pm to 1 am Jose Vivas
- 1 am to 6 am M-Th Abigail Th-Fr Ernesto Velez
- Weekends Fin de Semana Melitza Nazario y Ernesto Velez
