= WYQE =

- Naguabo, Puerto Rico; Puerto Rico
- Broadcast area: Puerto Rico
- Frequency: 92.9 MHz
- Branding: Yunque 92.9fm

Programming
- Format: Spanish Variety
- Affiliations: EBS MEDIA

Ownership
- Owner: JN Music Group y EBS Media; (Fajardo Broadcasting Company, Inc.)
- Sister stations: Visión 96.1fm, Ekklesia Visión 1600am

History
- First air date: December 29, 1994; 31 years ago
- Call sign meaning: W YunQuE

Technical information
- Licensing authority: FCC
- Facility ID: 19056
- Class: A
- ERP: 3,900 watts
- HAAT: 229.0 meters (751.3 ft)
- Transmitter coordinates: 18°16′42.8″N 65°40′11.5″W

Links
- Public license information: Public file; LMS
- Website: yunque93.com

WYQE (92.9 FM), branded on-air as Yunque 92.9fm, is a radio station broadcasting a Spanish Variety format. Licensed to Naguabo, Puerto Rico, it serves the Puerto Rico area. The station is currently owned by JN Music Group, a subsidiary of HMS Distributors, and the licensee is Fajardo Broadcasting Company, Inc. The station is currently operated by EBSMedia pursuant to a purchase agreement.
