= WRRH =

- Hormigueros, Puerto Rico; Puerto Rico
- Broadcast area: Puerto Rico
- Frequency: 106.1 MHz
- Branding: Renacer 106.1 FM

Programming
- Format: Contemporary Christian

Ownership
- Owner: Renacer Broadcasters Corporation; (Renacer Broadcasting, Inc.)

History
- First air date: March 17, 1995; 31 years ago
- Call sign meaning: Radio Renacer Hormigueros

Technical information
- Licensing authority: FCC
- Facility ID: 55693
- Class: B
- ERP: 60,000 watts
- HAAT: 854.0 meters (2,801.8 ft)
- Transmitter coordinates: 18°58′44″N 66°58′50″W

Links
- Public license information: Public file; LMS
- Website: renacer1061.com

WRRH (106.1 FM), branded on-air as Renacer 106.1 FM, is a radio station broadcasting a Contemporary Christian format. Licensed to Hormigueros, Puerto Rico, it serves the Puerto Rico area. The station is currently owned by Renacer Broadcasters Corporation.

The call letter "WRRH" also refer to the radio station of the Ramapo-Indian Hills School District in Franklin Lakes-Oakland-Wyckoff, New Jersey until 1989. It was a part-time, student-run radio station at 88.7 FM.
