= WZFE-LP =

- Moca, Puerto Rico; Puerto Rico
- Frequency: 98.3 MHz
- Branding: Radio Fe

Programming
- Format: Contemporary Christian

Ownership
- Owner: Melix Nieves; (Concilio de Iglesias Rios de Vida, Inc.)

History
- Former frequencies: 97.9 MHz (2014-2023)

Technical information
- Licensing authority: FCC
- Facility ID: 194188
- Class: L1
- Power: 132 watts
- Transmitter coordinates: 18°14′08.00″N 66°2′12.0″W

Links
- Public license information: LMS
- Website: www.radiofepr.org

WZFE-LP (98.3 FM, Radio FE) is a radio station broadcasting a Contemporary Christian format. Licensed to Moca, Puerto Rico, the station serves the western Puerto Rico area. The station is currently owned by Concilio de Iglesias Rios de Vida.
