= WZCL-LP =

- Cabo Rojo-Mayagüez, Puerto Rico; Puerto Rico
- Frequency: 98.1 MHz
- Branding: Club Radio

Programming
- Format: Adult Contemporary/News Talk

Ownership
- Owner: Club Radio PR Community, Inc.

History
- First air date: January 12, 2015

Technical information
- Licensing authority: FCC
- Facility ID: 192255
- Class: L1
- ERP: 65 watts
- Transmitter coordinates: 18°7′32.0″N 67°9′4.0″W

Links
- Public license information: LMS
- Website: www.club981.com

WZCL-LP (98.1 FM, Club Radio) is a radio station broadcasting an Adult Contemporary/News Talk format. Licensed to Cabo Rojo-Mayagüez, Puerto Rico, the station serves the western Puerto Rico area. The station is currently owned by Club Radio PR Community, Inc.
