= WCRP (FM) =

Christian radio station in Guayama, Puerto Rico

- Guayama, Puerto Rico; Puerto Rico
- Broadcast area: Puerto Rico
- Frequency: 88.1 MHz
- Branding: 88.1 Inspira

Programming
- Format: Contemporary Christian

Ownership
- Owner: Diaz-Pabon Ministries; (Ministerio Radial Cristo Viene Pronto, Inc.)

History
- First air date: January 14, 1982; 44 years ago
- Call sign meaning: Cristo Viene Pronto

Technical information
- Licensing authority: FCC
- Facility ID: 42685
- Class: B
- ERP: 31,000 watts
- HAAT: 853.0 meters (2,798.6 ft)
- Transmitter coordinates: 18°56′47″N 66°53′58″W

Links
- Public license information: Public file; LMS
- Webcast: Listen Live
- Website: 881inspira.fm

WCRP (88.1 MHz), branded on-air as 88.1 Inspira, is an FM radio station broadcasting a Contemporary Christian format. Licensed to Guayama, Puerto Rico, it serves the greater Puerto Rico area. The station is currently owned by Diaz-Pabon Ministries, through the licensee, Ministerio Radial Cristo Viene Pronto, Inc.
