= WBSG =

Radio station in Lajas, Puerto Rico

- Lajas, Puerto Rico; Puerto Rico
- Broadcast area: Puerto Rico
- Frequency: 1510 kHz
- Branding: Super 1510

Programming
- Format: Spanish variety

Ownership
- Owner: Perry John Galiano Cruz; (Perry Broadcasting Systems)

History
- First air date: 1985
- Former call signs: WIVD (1983-1984); WAVB (1984-2001); WTCV (2001-2002); WSQD (2002-2006)

Technical information
- Licensing authority: FCC
- Facility ID: 53629
- Class: B
- Power: 1,000 watts unlimited
- Transmitter coordinates: 18°2′11″N 67°4′58″W

Links
- Public license information: Public file; LMS
- Website: www.super1510.com

WBSG (1510 AM) is a radio station broadcasting a Spanish variety format. Licensed to Lajas, Puerto Rico, it serves all of Puerto Rico. The station is owned by Perry Broadcasting Systems. The WBSG call letters were assigned by the Federal Communications Commission on November 22, 2006.
