= WODB-LP =

Radio station licensed to Caguas, Puerto Rico

- Caguas, Puerto Rico; Puerto Rico
- Frequency: 90.9 MHz
- Branding: Adoración 90.9 FM

Programming
- Format: Contemporary Christian

Ownership
- Owner: Caguas Community Radio, Inc.

Technical information
- Licensing authority: FCC
- Facility ID: 194728
- Class: L1
- Power: 256 watts
- Transmitter coordinates: 18°14′08.00″N 66°2′12.0″W

Links
- Public license information: LMS
- Website: adoracion909fm.com

WODB-LP (90.9 FM) is a radio station broadcasting a Contemporary Christian format. Licensed to Caguas, Puerto Rico, the station serves the central Puerto Rico area. WODB-LP is owned by Caguas Community Radio, Inc. The station was a dream come true of the radio announcer Miguel A. Melendez requested in 2013 under Iglesia Refugio, Sanidad y Adoración, Inc. The station was sold to Caguas Community Radio on November 13, 2023.
