= WYKQ-LP =

- Aguadilla-Aguada, Puerto Rico; Puerto Rico
- Frequency: 107.9 MHz
- Branding: Candelita7

Programming
- Format: Contemporary Christian
- Affiliations: Candelita7

Ownership
- Owner: Radio Transformando Vidas Corp.

History
- First air date: December 22, 2016
- Former call signs: WVDJ-LP (2015-2019)

Technical information
- Licensing authority: FCC
- Facility ID: 192521
- Class: L1
- Power: 116 watts
- Transmitter coordinates: 18°13′29.3″N 67°9′22.9″W

Links
- Public license information: LMS
- Website: www.candelita7.com

WYKQ-LP (107.9 FM, Candelita7) is a radio station broadcasting a Contemporary Christian format. Licensed to Aguadilla-Aguada, Puerto Rico, the station serves the western Puerto Rico area. The station is currently owned by Radio Transformando Vidas Corp.

On January 4, 2019, Taller Cultural Jaycoa sells WVDJ-LP for no consideration to Restauracion Ministries, Inc, a non-profit corporation managed by Jose Mercado Montalvo and it is expected to switch to a Contemporary Christian format. All of the WVDJ programming has been moved to an online radio station. On January 9, the station changed the call letters to WYKQ-LP. The sale of the station was dismissed on January 19, 2019. Instead, WYKQ-LP had still operated by Restauracion Ministries.

On March 3, 2020, for the second time in a row, Taller Cultural Jaycoa will sell WYKQ-LP to Restauracion Ministries, Inc; while maintaining the Contemporary Christian format. The sale was completed on April 14, 2020.
