= WPPC =

Radio station in Peñuelas, Puerto Rico

- Peñuelas, Puerto Rico; Puerto Rico
- Broadcast area: Puerto Rico
- Frequency: 1570 kHz
- Branding: Radio Felicidad

Programming
- Format: Religious

Ownership
- Owner: Ponce Gospel Broadcasting; (Radio Felicidad, Inc.)

History
- First air date: July 2, 1976
- Call sign meaning: Peñuelas-Ponce

Technical information
- Licensing authority: FCC
- Facility ID: 52948
- Class: D
- Power: 1,000 watts day 126 watts night
- Transmitter coordinates: 18°3′47″N 66°43′4″W
- Translator: 92.1 W221EB (Ponce)

Links
- Public license information: Public file; LMS
- Webcast: Listen Live
- Website: radiofelicidadpr.com

WPPC (1570 AM) is a radio station broadcasting a Religious format in Peñuelas, Puerto Rico. The station is currently owned by Ponce Gospel Broadcasting, and its license is held by Radio Felicidad, Inc.

== Translator stations ==
Broadcast translator for WPPC
Call sign	Frequency	City of license	FID	ERP (W)	FCC info
W221EB	92.1 FM	Ponce, Puerto Rico	201352	.25	LMS
