= WQII =

- San Juan, Puerto Rico; Puerto Rico
- Broadcast area: Puerto Rico
- Frequency: 1140 kHz
- Branding: 11Q Radio 1140 AM

Programming
- Format: Talk/Personality

Ownership
- Owner: Communications Counsel Group; (Communications Counsel Group, Inc.)

History
- First air date: September 7, 1948
- Former call signs: WITA (1948-1970); WJIT (1970-1975)
- Call sign meaning: QII (backwards) = 11Q

Technical information
- Licensing authority: FCC
- Facility ID: 12712
- Class: B
- Power: 10,000 watts unlimited
- Transmitter coordinates: 18°21′30″N 66°8′5″W

Links
- Public license information: Public file; LMS
- Website: 11qradio.com

WQII (1140 AM) is a radio station broadcasting a Talk/Personality format. Licensed to San Juan, Puerto Rico, it serves the Puerto Rico area. The station is currently owned by Communications Counsel Group.

== 11Q TV ==
11Q TV is an online-video streaming service, owned by 11Q Radio. 11Q TV broadcasts local programming, that includes: news, sports, lifestyle & community service programs, from its studios in San Juan. 11Q TV consists of both a 24-hour linear streaming channel and on-demand programming from 11Q 1140 AM. 11Q TV is available on the station's website: www.11qradio.com.
