= WRSS =

Radio station in San Sebastián, Puerto Rico

- San Sebastián, Puerto Rico; Puerto Rico
- Broadcast area: Puerto Rico
- Frequency: 1410 kHz
- Branding: Radio Progreso

Programming
- Format: Spanish News/Talk

Ownership
- Owner: Angel Vera-Maury; (Radio Progreso, Inc.)

History
- First air date: June 21, 1984
- Call sign meaning: Radio San Sebastian

Technical information
- Licensing authority: FCC
- Facility ID: 49971
- Class: B
- Power: 1,000 watts unlimited
- Transmitter coordinates: 18°19′14″N 66°58′45″W

Links
- Public license information: Public file; LMS

WRSS (1410 AM) is a radio station broadcasting a Spanish News/Talk format. Licensed to San Sebastián, Puerto Rico, it serves the Puerto Rico area. The station is currently owned by Angel Vera-Maury. Its station licensee is Radio Progreso, Inc.
