= WOQI =

Radio station to serve Adjuntas, Puerto Rico

Adjuntas, Puerto Rico; Puerto Rico
- Frequency: 1020 kHz
- Branding: Radio Casa Pueblo

Programming
- Format: Spanish Community

Ownership
- Owner: Casa Pueblo; (Radio Casa Pueblo, Inc.)

History
- First air date: January 16, 1989
- Former call signs: WPJC (1989-2001)
- Call sign meaning: COQUI

Technical information
- Licensing authority: FCC
- Facility ID: 64593
- Class: B
- Power: 1,000 watts day 280 watts night
- Transmitter coordinates: 18°09′04″N 66°42′48″W

Links
- Public license information: Public file; LMS
- Website: WOQI Online

WOQI (1020 AM, "Radio Casa Pueblo") is a Community radio station licensed to serve Adjuntas, Puerto Rico. The station is owned by Radio Casa Pueblo, Inc. The station was the first to operate entirely with renewable energy. It airs a Spanish non-profit variety format.

The station was assigned the WOQI call letters by the Federal Communications Commission on March 20, 2001.
