= WCPR (AM) =

Radio station in Coamo, Puerto Rico

- Coamo, Puerto Rico; Puerto Rico
- Frequency: 1450 kHz
- Branding: Radio Coamo

Programming
- Format: Spanish variety format

Ownership
- Owner: José David Soler Cordero; (Coamo Broadcasting Corporation)

History
- First air date: June 30, 1967
- Call sign meaning: Coamo Puerto Rico

Technical information
- Licensing authority: FCC
- Facility ID: 12136
- Class: B
- Power: 1,000 watts unlimited
- Transmitter coordinates: 18°05′21.00″N 66°22′13.86″W

Links
- Public license information: Public file; LMS

WCPR (1450 kHz) is an AM radio station broadcasting a Spanish variety format. It is licensed to Coamo, Puerto Rico, and is owned by José David Soler Cordero under its licensee, Coamo Broadcasting Corporation.
