= WMIO =

- Cabo Rojo, Puerto Rico; Puerto Rico
- Broadcast area: Puerto Rico
- Frequency: 102.3 MHz
- Branding: HOT 102.5

Programming
- Languages: Spanish and English
- Format: Top 40/CHR
- Affiliations: iHeartMedia

Ownership
- Owner: Uno Radio Group; (Arso Radio Corporation)
- Sister stations: WCMN, WCMN-FM, WUNO, WFID, WPRM-FM, WTOK-FM, WNEL, WPRP, WRIO, WZAR, WORA, WIVA-FM, WFDT

History
- First air date: December 15, 1988; 37 years ago
- Call sign meaning: Maria Isabel Ortiz (station founder)

Technical information
- Licensing authority: FCC
- Facility ID: 40052
- Class: B
- ERP: 31,000 watts
- HAAT: 827.0 meters (2,713.3 ft)
- Transmitter coordinates: 18°59′37″N 67°50′38.9″W

Links
- Public license information: Public file; LMS
- Webcast: Listen live (via iHeartRadio)
- Website: Hot102pr.com

WMIO (102.3 FM), branded on-air as HOT 102.5, is a radio station broadcasting a bilingual Top 40/CHR format. Licensed to Cabo Rojo, Puerto Rico, it serves the Puerto Rico area. The station is currently owned by Uno Radio Group and repeats the audio of WCMN-FM.

== History ==
On December 15, 1988, WMIO begins operations on 102.3 FM, branded as MusiRadio. the station was founded by Maria Isabel Ortiz Avilés, which is the daughter of radio entrepreneur, David Ortiz. The station was broadcast Beautiful Music and Adult Standards. in the 1990s, WMIO was a repeater for WFID, and later with WIAC-FM, until was sold to Bestov Broadcasting on April 14, 1999.

In March 2007, Uno Radio Group officially acquired WMIO from Bestov Broadcasting (previously known as Audioactiva 102.3 FM) and chained it with WCMN-FM "Toca De To' 107.3 FM".

On January 9, 2009, MSG Radio Inc. acquired WIAC-FM and through a contract with Uno Radio Group the Toca De To' brand was moved to 102.5 FM on January 16, 2009. Old Toca De To stations WCMN-FM 107.3 and WMIO 102.3 continue as "107.3 Mi Emisora" and did not simulcast WIAC-FM.

In August 2011 and after 102.5 FM change its name to Hot 102, 107.3 FM and 102.3 FM adopted again the brand "Toca De To" but this time as a slogan. By 2012, WMIO and WCMN became a simulcast of WTOK's Top 40 format.
