= WLEO =

Radio station licensed to serve Puerto Rico

- Ponce, Puerto Rico; Puerto Rico
- Broadcast area: Puerto Rico
- Frequency: 1170 kHz
- Branding: Radio Leo

Programming
- Format: Spanish Variety

Ownership
- Owner: Episcopal Media Group; (Iglesia Episcopal Puertorriqueña, Inc.)

History
- First air date: December 11, 1956
- Former call signs: WZUR (1997–2002)

Technical information
- Licensing authority: FCC
- Facility ID: 52943
- Class: B
- Power: 20,000 watts
- Transmitter coordinates: 17°58′52″N 66°36′51″W

Links
- Public license information: Public file; LMS
- Website: radioleo1170.com

WLEO (1170 AM), branded on-air as Radio Leo, is a radio station broadcasting a Spanish Variety format. Licensed to Ponce, Puerto Rico, it serves the Puerto Rico area. The station is currently owned by the Episcopal Diocese of Puerto Rico.

== Ownership ==
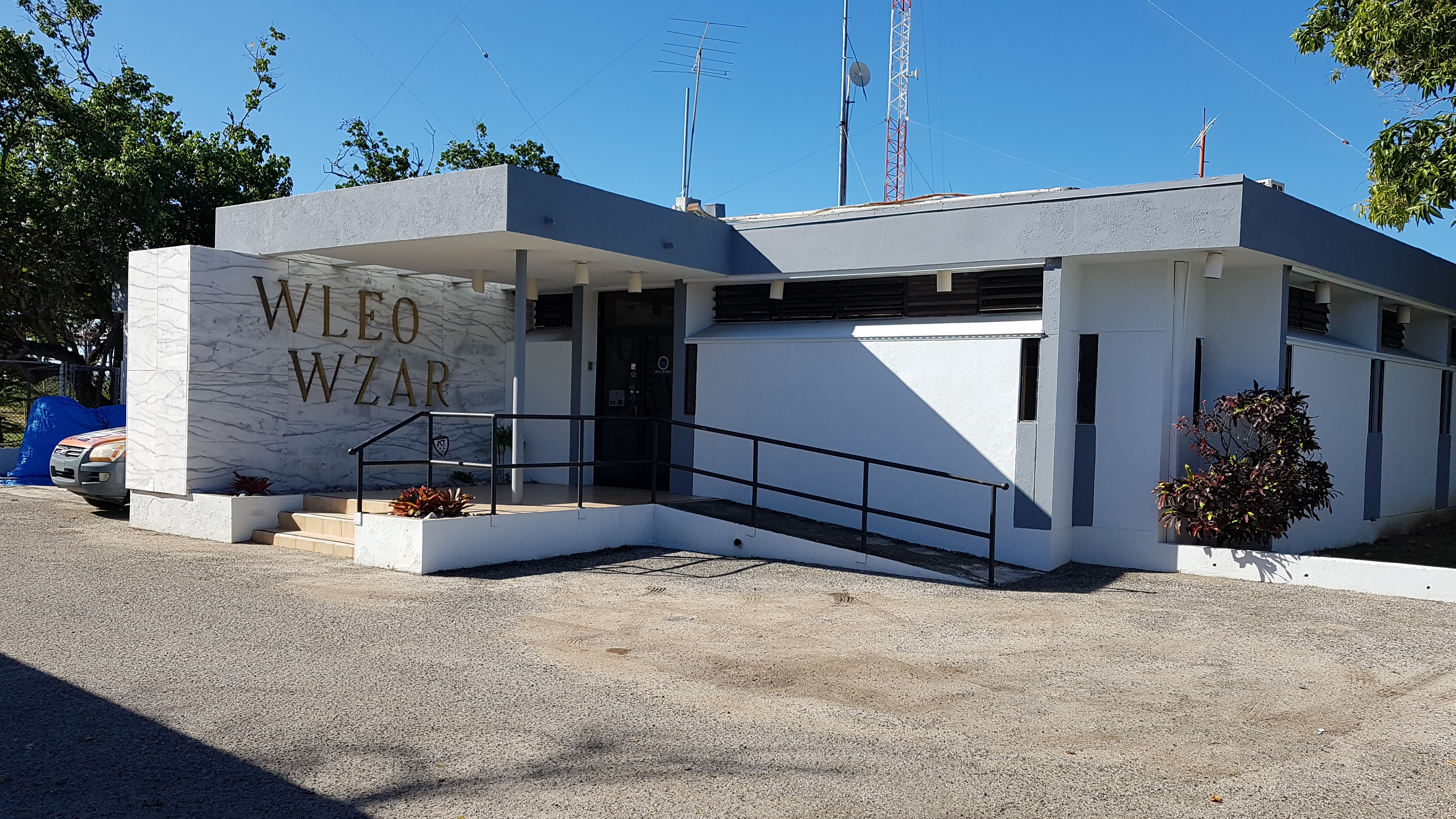
WLEO Radio Station at Puerto Viejo, Barrio Playa, Ponce, PR

Previous logo

In July 1999, Uno Radio of Ponce Inc., Caguas, P.R. (Jesus M. Soto, chairman) reached an agreement to purchase five radio stations in Puerto Rico from Ponce Broadcasting Corp. (Janero G. Scarano Sr., Julio C. Braum, Luis F. Sala, Catalina Scarano and Sala Business Corp., shareholders) for a reported sale price of $10.75 million.

On 24 December 2019, the Episcopal Diocese of Puerto Rico reached an agreement to purchase WLEO from Uno Radio Group for $1.1 million. The sale was consummated on 29 February 2020.
