= WFID =

Radio station in Río Piedras–San Juan, Puerto Rico

Río Piedras, Puerto Rico; United States
- Broadcast area: San Juan, Puerto Rico
- Frequency: 95.7 MHz
- Branding: Fidelity

Programming
- Languages: Spanish and English
- Format: Adult Contemporary
- Affiliations: iHeartMedia (2020–present)

Ownership
- Owner: Uno Radio Group; (Madifide, Inc.)
- Sister stations: WUNO, WPRP, WORA, WCMN, WPRM, WIVA, WRIO, WTOK-FM, WCMN-FM, WMIO, WNEL

History
- First air date: November 17, 1958; 67 years ago
- Call sign meaning: Fidelity

Technical information
- Licensing authority: FCC
- Facility ID: 10063
- Class: B
- ERP: 50,000 watts
- HAAT: 857.0 meters (2,811.7 ft)
- Transmitter coordinates: 18°16′58″N 68°58′55.9″W

Links
- Public license information: Public file; LMS
- Webcast: Listen live (via iHeartRadio)
- Website: fidelitypr.com

WFID (95.7 FM), branded on-air as Fidelity, is a radio station licensed to serve Río Piedras, Puerto Rico, established in 1958. As of 2015 it is owned by the Uno Radio Group, and the broadcast license held by Madifide, Inc.

WFID broadcasts an Adult Contemporary music format.

== History ==
WFID's predecessor was Fidelity Broadcasting Corporation. The founders, Rafael Acosta and his wife Victoria Suarez, made their first broadcast from their house with a 250W FM transmitter on November 17, 1958 before hiring others. It was Puerto Rico's third FM radio station (along with WIOB in Mayagüez and WKAQ-FM in San Juan).

Originally, WFID broadcast on 95.9 MHz, but this frequency was at that time catalogued as Class A, subject to power restrictions, so Acosta applied for a change to 95.7 MHz, class B, increased in 1962 to 12,500 watts. Acosta frequently travelled to the United States to stay up to date with technology, particularly the Gates transmitters and equipment. Acosta died in 1971, before FM became predominant. In 1962 it became the first FM radio station to broadcast in stereo in Puerto Rico and Latin America. After Acosta's death the station was managed by Suarez, known as Doña Vicky, and the Acostas' son José Julián and daughter Carola. In 1980 Beautiful Music Service began broadcasting music for businesses. In 1983 the recently acquired WUNO was turned into NotiUno, a newstalk radio station. As of 2015 the 50,000-watt WFID was owned and operated by Arso Radio Corporation under Jesús Soto, who had been a friend of Acosta's.

Carlos Montalbán, brother of Ricardo Montalbán was the principal announcer in the early 1970s. WFID was the first FM radio station to broadcast salsa in stereo, Saturday nights on their program "El Bailable Don Q". The program switched to Spanish ballads when the first salsa FM station came on the air. That radio station was Jesus Soto's WPRM-FM, SalSoul 98.

In June 2025, the Puerto Rico State Senate recognized the work of Amós Morales for his significant contribution to the media in Puerto Rico.

== Satellites ==
Callsign	Frequency	City of license	Broadcast Area	ERP	HAAT	First air date	Former callsigns	Licensee
WFDT	105.5 FM	Aguada		31,000 watts	650.0 meters (2,132.5 ft)	April 20, 1977; 48 years ago	WRFE (1977–1992); WNNV (1992–2000)	Arso Radio Corporation
WZAR	101.9 FM	Ponce		31,000 watts	789.0 meters (2,588.6 ft)	March 17, 1966; 59 years ago	WLEO-FM (1966–1979)	Uno Radio of Ponce, Inc.

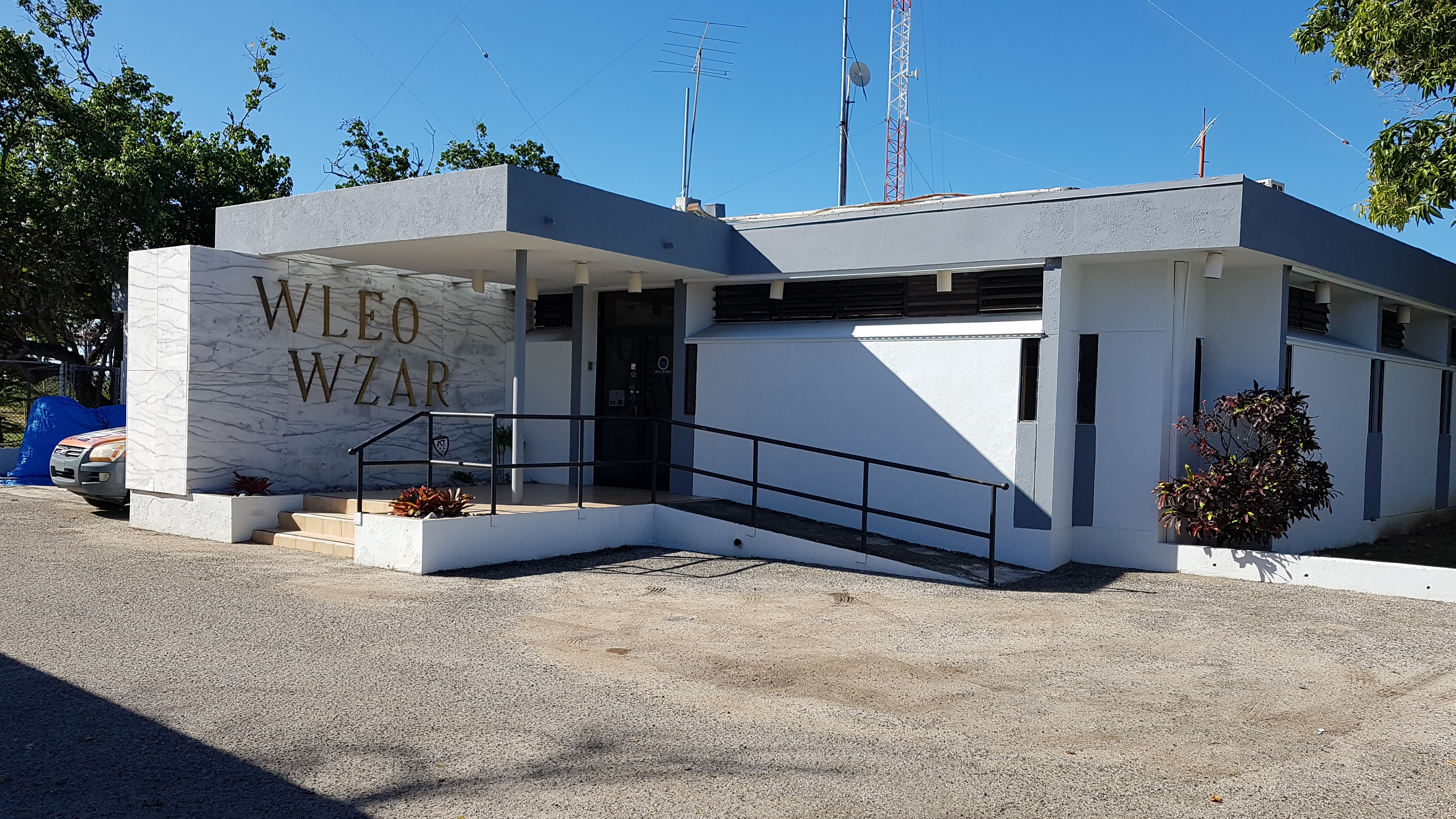
WZAR Radio Station at Puerto Viejo, Barrio Playa, Ponce, Puerto Rico

Logo until 2010.
