= WKUM =

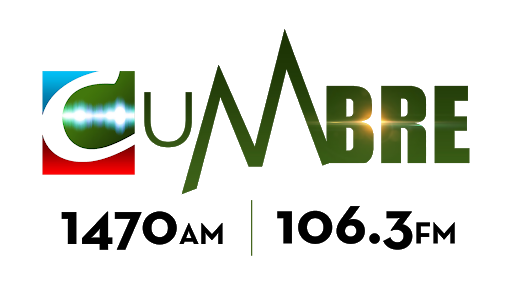

Orocovis, Puerto Rico; Puerto Rico
- Broadcast area: Puerto Rico
- Frequency: 1470 kHz
- Branding: Cumbre 1470 AM / 106.3 FM

Programming
- Format: Spanish Variety format/News talk
- Affiliations: Red Informativa de PR

Ownership
- Owner: Cumbre Media Group Corp.; (Dr. Luis Rodriguez Gotay)

History
- First air date: October 15, 1979
- Former call signs: WKCK (1979-2015)
- Call sign meaning: KUMbre

Technical information
- Licensing authority: FCC
- Facility ID: 54782
- Class: B
- Power: 2,400 watts day 4,300 watts night
- Transmitter coordinates: 18°15′24″N 66°25′0″W
- Translator: 106.3 W292GC (Corozal)

Links
- Public license information: Public file; LMS
- Website: cumbre1470am.com

WKUM (1470 AM) is a radio station broadcasting a Spanish variety format. Licensed to Orocovis, Puerto Rico, it serves the Puerto Rico area. The station was founded in 1979 and is currently owned by Cumbre Media Group Corp and features programming from Red Informativa de PR.

== History ==
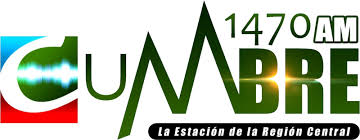
Logo before translator sign on

WKUM was founded on October 15, 1979, by Luis Rodríguez Bou. Formerly "WKCK Radio Cumbre" ("cumbre" is "summit" in Spanish language). After the death of Rodríguez Bou his son, Dr. Luis Rodríguez Gotay, assumes control of the station and changes its format from music-top 40 to news-talk.

== Translator stations ==
Broadcast translator for WKUM
Call sign	Frequency	City of license	FID	ERP (W)	FCC info
W292GC	106.3 FM	Corozal, Puerto Rico	203041	.237	LMS
