= WUPR =

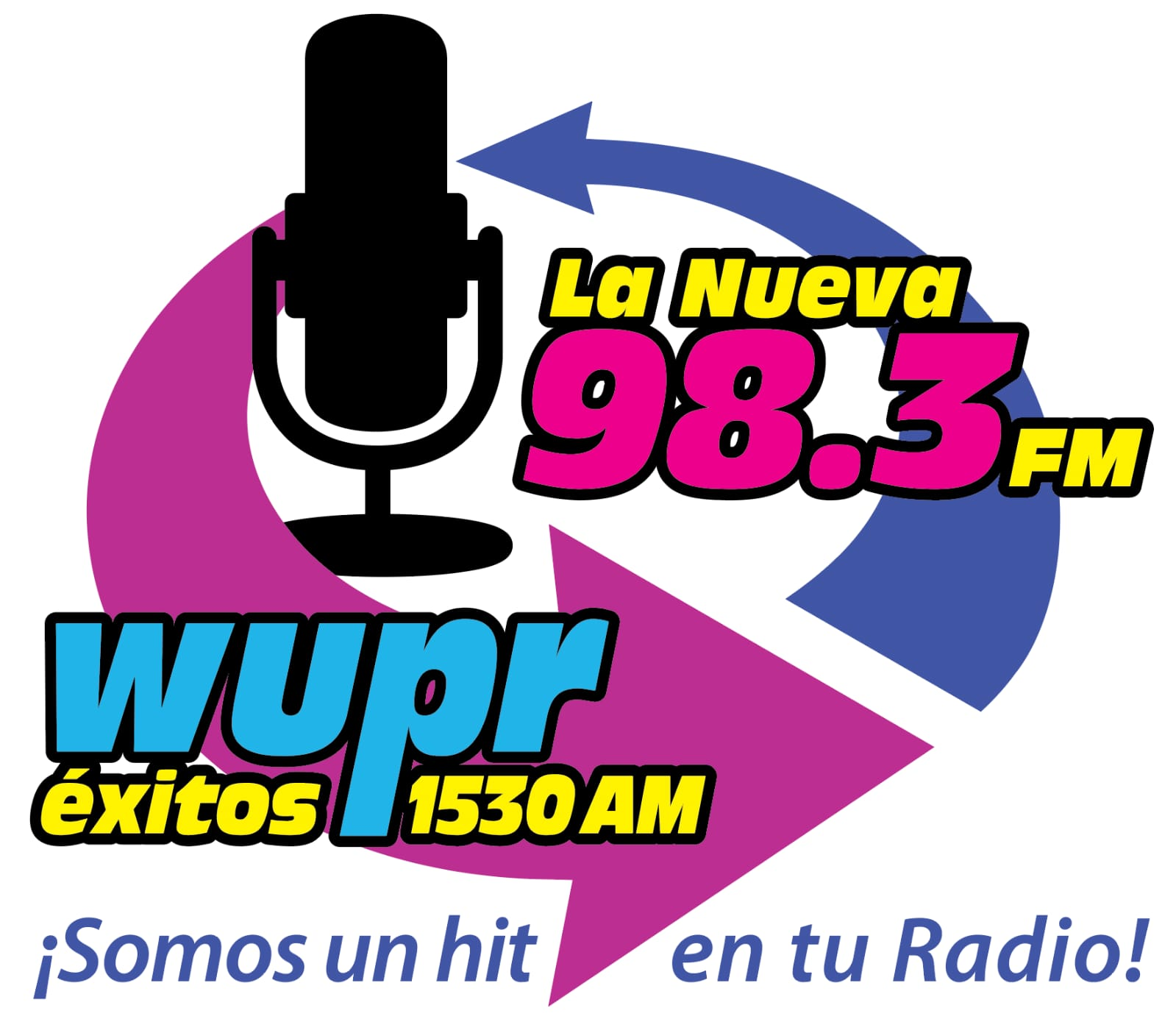

Utuado, Puerto Rico; Puerto Rico
- Broadcast area: Puerto Rico
- Frequency: 1530 kHz
- Branding: Éxitos 1530 y La Nueva 98.3

Programming
- Format: Spanish variety
- Affiliations: Red Informativa de PR

Ownership
- Owner: Central Broadcasting Corporation

History
- First air date: April 4, 1964
- Call sign meaning: Utuado Puerto Rico

Technical information
- Licensing authority: FCC
- Facility ID: 9791
- Class: B
- Power: 1,000 watts day 250 watts night
- Transmitter coordinates: 18°16′4″N 66°42′35″W
- Translator: 98.3 W252EG (Utuado)

Links
- Public license information: Public file; LMS
- Webcast: Listen Live
- Website: WUPR Online

WUPR (1530 AM), branded on-air as Éxitos 1530 y La Nueva 98.3, is a radio station broadcasting a Spanish variety format. Licensed to Utuado, Puerto Rico, it serves the Puerto Rico area. The station is owned by Central Broadcasting Corporation and features programming from Red Informativa de PR.

== History ==
WUPR was founded on April 4, 1964 by Benito Martinez. After the death of Benito Martinez in 1992 his son, Jose Martinez Giraud, assumed control of the station and changed its format from music-top 40 to music and news-talk.

== Translator stations ==
Broadcast translator for WUPR
Call sign	Frequency	City of license	FID	ERP (W)	FCC info
W252EG	98.3 FM	Utuado, Puerto Rico	203235	250	LMS
