= WORA (AM) =

Radio station in Mayagüez, Puerto Rico

- Mayagüez, Puerto Rico; Puerto Rico
- Frequency: 760 kHz
- Branding: Noti Uno Oeste

Programming
- Format: News/talk
- Affiliations: iHeartMedia

Ownership
- Owner: Uno Radio Group; (Arso Radio Corporation)
- Sister stations: WCMN, WCMN-FM, WNEL, WMIO, WPRP, WUNO, WFID, WZAR, WFDT, WTOK-FM, WPRM-FM, WIVA-FM, WRIO

History
- First air date: 1947; 79 years ago
- Call sign meaning: Oeste Ramirez de Arellano

Technical information
- Licensing authority: FCC
- Facility ID: 54480
- Class: B
- Power: 5,000 watts unlimited
- Transmitter coordinates: 18°11′30″N 67°9′28″W
- Translator: 99.9 W260DR (Mayagüez)

Links
- Public license information: Public file; LMS
- Webcast: Listen live (via iHeartRadio)
- Website: www.notiuno.com

WORA (760 kHz, "Noti Uno Oeste") is an AM radio station licensed to serve Mayagüez, Puerto Rico. The station is owned by the Uno Radio Group and licensed to the Arso Radio Corporation. It airs a news/talk format. The station is shared with translator station W260DR 99.9 FM also located in Mayagüez.

The station was assigned the WORA call letters by the Federal Communications Commission in 1947.

== Translator stations ==
Broadcast translator for WORA
Call sign	Frequency	City of license	FID	ERP (W)	FCC info
W260DR	99.9 FM	Mayagüez, Puerto Rico	203174	250	LMS
