= WUNO =

Radio station in San Juan, Puerto Rico

- San Juan, Puerto Rico; Puerto Rico
- Broadcast area: Puerto Rico
- Frequency: 630 kHz
- Branding: Noti Uno 630

Programming
- Format: News Talk Information
- Affiliations: CNN Radio iHeartMedia

Ownership
- Owner: Uno Radio Group; (Arso Radio Corporation)
- Sister stations: WFID, WPRM-FM, WTOK-FM, WPRP, WRIO, WZAR, WORA, WIVA-FM, WMIO, WFDT, WCMN, WCMN-FM, WNEL

History
- First air date: November 5, 1957; 68 years ago
- Former call signs: WKYN (1957–1960); WQBS (1960–1992); WSKN (1992–2000)
- Call sign meaning: Noti UNO Metro

Technical information
- Licensing authority: FCC
- Facility ID: 54476
- Class: B
- Power: 50,000 watts unlimited
- Transmitter coordinates: 18°25′59″N 66°16′22″W
- Translator: 94.3 W232DH (San Juan)

Links
- Public license information: Public file; LMS
- Webcast: Listen live (via iHeartRadio)
- Website: notiuno.com

WUNO (630 AM), branded on-air as Noti Uno 630, is a radio station broadcasting a News Talk Information format. Licensed to San Juan, Puerto Rico, it serves the Puerto Rico area. The station is currently owned by Uno Radio Group and features programming from CNN Radio. The station's programming is also heard on translator station W232DH 94.3 FM, serving the entire metropolitan area.

== History ==
The idea of consolidating Puerto Rico's major radio networks under a single parent company and under one roof stems from the vision of its founder and current Chairman of the Board, Mr. Jesús M. Soto, three decades ago. A visionary and entrepreneur, Soto acquired his first radio stations against all predictions of success. These were followed by WNEL-AM (founded on July 21, 1947) and WPRM-FM, which in 1972 gave rise to Turabo Radio Corporation and Arso Radio Corporation. At that time, the rise of FM radio stations began and the Cadena Salsoul phenomenon, the leader in radio audiences on the island, was born. In the 1980s, Soto began planning the expansion of his radio stations by acquiring WIVA-FM in the western region and making Salsoul the first tropical music radio station in Puerto Rico. Years later, the South Region also joined with the purchase of WRIO-FM, providing coverage across the entire island. The trend toward market consolidation motivated Soto, along with two of his sons who joined him in the business, Luis Alberto "Tuto" and Anthony "Junior" (RIP), to pursue their expansion plans by acquiring radio stations in the state of Florida. However, Puerto Rico had always been his focus and starting point. Thus, in 1997, Soto saw the opportunity to return two of the metropolitan area's leading radio stations to Puerto Rican hands by acquiring WUNO-AM (established in 1935) and WFID-FM (established in 1958). With this acquisition of Noti-Uno and Fidelity, two new radio formats were added to those already in operation, and the Uno Radio Group consortium was created. In 2001, under the presidency of Luis A. Soto, the company made a historic frequency change from Noti-Uno to Super Kadena, with Uno Radio acquiring the station's assets to improve Noti-Uno's signal and coverage across the island. In 2004, Uno Radio Group continued its expansion plans by acquiring two new stations: WCMN-FM and WCMN-AM, or Noti-Uno del Norte. With these two stations, they were able to expand their format offerings and coverage. In 2009, WCMN-FM became "107.3 Mi Emisora" (107.3 My Station), with a youth format that officially became Hot 102 in 2011. WCMN-AM began broadcasting Noti-Uno's entire programming in northern Puerto Rico. WCMN-AM and FM were established in 1946. Currently, Uno Radio Group is a network of radio stations run by a family of Puerto Rican broadcasters who have been actively involved in the local radio industry for over three decades. In fact, after the death of Soto's eldest son, Anthony "Junior," the youngest member of the family, Jaime "Gogo," joined the company.

== NotiUno TV ==
NotiUno TV is an online-video streaming service, owned by Uno Radio Group. NotiUno TV broadcasts news and analysis programming, from its studios in San Juan. NotiUno TV consists of both a 24-hour linear streaming channel and on-demand programming from NotiUno 630 AM. NotiUno TV is available on NotiUno.com or on Liberty Cablevision channel 734

== NotiUno Network ==
WUNO & W232DH are the flagship stations of the NotiUno Radio Network. WUNO's programming is also heard on WPRP 910 AM & W238DH 95.5 FM in Ponce and the south, WCMN 1280 AM & W221ER 92.1 FM in Arecibo and the north, WORA 760 AM and W260DR 99.9 FM in Mayaguez-Aguadilla and the west and WNEL 1430 AM in Caguas and the central region.

== Translator stations ==
Broadcast translator for WUNO
Call sign	Frequency	City of license	FID	ERP (W)	FCC info
W232DH	94.3 FM	San Juan, Puerto Rico	85936	250	LMS

== Programming ==
- Normando en la Mañana con Normando Valentín
- A Palo Limpio con los licenciados Iván Rivera y Ramón Rosario
- Sin Miedo con Alejandro García Padilla y Carmelo Ríos
- Pelota Dura con Ferdinand Pérez
- Profesor Ángel Rosa en el 630
- En Caliente con Carmen Jovet
- En La Mirilla con Luis Dávila Colón
- El Pique de Falú con Luis Enrique Falú
- NotiUno en la Noche
- Tema Libre
- Contacto NotiUno

== Weekend programming ==
- Mundo Natural
- Cita Medica
- Sobre la Noticia
- Dando Soluciones
- Viva Carolina Tu Revista Radial
- Desde la Sociedad Civil
- Ortopedia al Dia
- Economia 101
- Nuestros Jovenes Conversan
- Siempre Alfred
- Dinares de Iraq y Mucho Mas
- Hasta que la Muerte nos Separe
- Momentos de Amor y de Bohemia
- Alegria para el Alma
- Sembrando Semillas
- Medicina Alternativa
- Vivir con Salud
- Conferencia de Prensa
- Lo Mejor Para Todos
- Sentencia 630
- Politica Social
- Todo Sobre Veteranos
- Cuba 630
- De Cara al Futuro
- Noti Uno Internacional
