= WEXS =

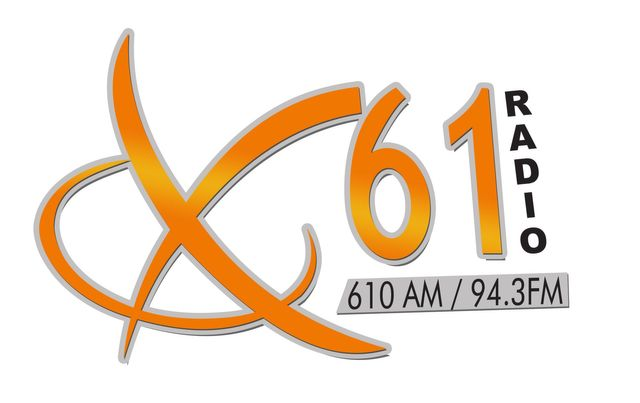

Patillas, Puerto Rico; Puerto Rico
- Broadcast area: Puerto Rico area
- Frequency: 610 kHz
- Branding: X61

Programming
- Format: Contemporary hit radio
- Affiliations: Red Informativa de PR

Ownership
- Owner: Garcia-Cruz Radio Corporation; (Community Broadcasting, Inc.)

History
- First air date: August 20, 1991
- Call sign meaning: Emisora X del Sureste; EXitoS

Technical information
- Licensing authority: FCC
- Facility ID: 12819
- Class: B
- ERP: 250 watts day 1,000 watts night
- Transmitter coordinates: 18°0′36.00″N 66°1′28.00″W
- Translator: 94.3 W232DR (Patillas)

Links
- Public license information: Public file; LMS

WEXS (610 AM, "X61") is a radio station broadcasting a contemporary hit radio format. Licensed to Patillas, Puerto Rico, the station serves the Puerto Rico area. The station is currently owned by Garcia-Cruz Radio Corporation, through licensee Community Broadcasting, Inc. and features programming from Red Informativa de PR.

== Logos ==
Former WEXS logo.

== Translator stations ==
Broadcast translator for WEXS
Call sign	Frequency	City of license	FID	ERP (W)	FCC info
W232DR	94.3 FM	Patillas, Puerto Rico	202780	.25	LMS
