= WNEL =

Radio station in Caguas, Puerto Rico

Caguas, Puerto Rico; Puerto Rico
- Frequency: 1430 kHz
- Branding: Radio Tiempo

Programming
- Format: News/Sports/Spanish Oldies
- Affiliations: NotiUno, iHeartMedia

Ownership
- Owner: Uno Radio Group; (Turabo Radio Corporation)
- Sister stations: WUNO, WPRP, WORA, WCMN, WFID, WZAR, WFDT, WPRM-FM, WIVA-FM, WRIO, WTOK-FM, WCMN-FM, WMIO

History
- First air date: July 21, 1947; 78 years ago
- Former call signs: WRIA (1947–1952); WMIA (1952–1955)

Technical information
- Licensing authority: FCC
- Facility ID: 68355
- Class: B
- Power: 5,000 watts
- Transmitter coordinates: 18.245781°N 66.022801°W
- Translator: 96.1 W241CW (Caguas)

Links
- Public license information: Public file; LMS
- Website: www.radiotiempo.net

WNEL (1430 AM, Radio Tiempo) is a radio station in Caguas, Puerto Rico, broadcasting a News, Sports and Spanish Oldies format. The station is currently owned by Turabo Radio Corporation. The station is rebroadcast on translator station W241CW (96.1 FM), also located in Caguas.

== History ==
The Inter-American Radio Corporation applied for a construction permit to build a new radio station in Caguas on July 30, 1946, and was granted the permit for a 250-watt outlet on 1450 kHz on December 26 of that year. The firm was owned by the Biascochea family of San Juan. WRIA went on the air on July 21, 1947, with a twelve-hour inaugural program. The young station became embroiled in a conflict with the Federal Communications Commission (FCC). On November 15, 1950, the commission revoked WRIA's broadcast license and ordered the station to cease operating within 15 days for failure to follow FCC engineering rules and regulations. The station requested a formal hearing, being allowed to continue operating in the process, and was granted one by the commission in January 1951. The station argued financial issues had caused the engineering shortfalls. After the hearing, the station's technical facilities improved to the point where one commissioner, Paul A. Walker, set aside the revocation ruling in October 1950. The commission then granted WRIA a renewal.

WRIA became WMIA on July 4, 1952. By 1953, the station was including time information every five minutes, calling itself "El Reloj de Borinquen" (The Clock of Borinquen). The station changed its call sign again to WNEL on February 8, 1955. The studios were heavily damaged in a 1979 fire; the station was able to remain on the air by hastily moving to an office above a Chase Manhattan Bank branch.

== Translator stations ==
Broadcast translator for WNEL
Call sign	Frequency	City of license	FID	ERP (W)	FCC info
W241CW	96.1 FM	Caguas, Puerto Rico	203170	.25	LMS
