= WMDD =

Radio station in Fajardo, Puerto Rico

Fajardo, Puerto Rico; Puerto Rico
- Frequency: 1480 kHz
- Branding: El 1480

Programming
- Format: Spanish tropical; news talk
- Affiliations: Red Informativa de PR

Ownership
- Owner: Pan Caribbean Broadcasting de P.R., Inc.; (Friedman Family)

History
- First air date: November 26, 1947
- Call sign meaning: Madrazo Diaz Diaz

Technical information
- Licensing authority: FCC
- Facility ID: 51427
- Class: B
- Power: 5,000 watts (unlimited)
- Transmitter coordinates: 18°21′46″N 65°38′24″W
- Translator: 106.5 W293DU (Fajardo)

Links
- Public license information: Public file; LMS
- Website: www.el1480.net

WMDD (1480 AM) is a radio station licensed to serve Fajardo, Puerto Rico. The station is owned by Pan Caribbean Broadcasting de P.R., Inc. It airs a Spanish tropical and news-talk format.

The station was assigned the WMDD call letters by the Federal Communications Commission on November 26, 1947.

== Translator stations ==
Broadcast translator for WMDD
Call sign	Frequency	City of license	FID	ERP (W)	FCC info
W293DU	106.5 FM	Fajardo, Puerto Rico	202123	.25	LMS
