= WCMN-FM =

Radio station in Arecibo, Puerto Rico

Arecibo, Puerto Rico; Puerto Rico
- Broadcast area: San Juan, Puerto Rico
- Frequency: 107.3 MHz
- Branding: HOT 102.5

Programming
- Languages: Spanish and English
- Format: Top 40/CHR
- Affiliations: iHeartMedia

Ownership
- Owner: Uno Radio Group; (Caribbean Broadcasting Corporation)
- Sister stations: WTOK-FM, WMIO, WUNO, WPRP, WORA, WCMN, WNEL, WPRM-FM, WIVA-FM, WRIO, WFID, WZAR, WFDT

History
- First air date: 1967; 59 years ago
- Call sign meaning: Carlos Esteva Mercedes Esteva Norte (station founders and station location on the island)

Technical information
- Licensing authority: FCC
- Facility ID: 8790
- Class: B
- ERP: 21,450 watts
- HAAT: 825.0 meters (2,706.7 ft)
- Transmitter coordinates: 18°14′45″N 66°48′38″W
- Repeaters: 107.3 WCMN-FM3 (Ponce); 107.3 WCMN-FM6 (Mayagüez)

Links
- Public license information: Public file; LMS
- Webcast: Listen live (via iHeartRadio)
- Website: hot102pr.com

WCMN-FM (107.3 MHz), branded on-air as HOT 102.5, is a radio station broadcasting a bilingual Top 40/CHR format. Licensed to Arecibo, Puerto Rico, it serves the Puerto Rico area. The station is currently owned by Uno Radio Group.

The station is relayed through booster stations, WCMN-FM3 in Ponce and WCMN-FM6 in Mayagüez, which also broadcasts on 107.3 MHz.

== History ==
WCMN-FM was the first FM radio station to be licensed on the north of Puerto Rico. During most of its history it was called "Delta 107". In February 2004, WCMN-FM was acquired by "Uno Radio Group". In May 2004, WCMN-FM changed its brand name from "107.3 Delta" to just "107.3" and added the "Toca De Tó" slogan which eventually became the new brand name.

In March 2007, Uno Radio Group officially acquired WMIO from Bestov Broadcasting (previously known as Audioactiva 102.3 FM) and chained it with WCMN-FM.

On January 9, 2009, MSG Radio Inc. acquired WIAC-FM and the Toca De Tó brand moved to 102.5 FM on January 16, 2009. Old Toca De Tó stations WCMN-FM 107.3 and WMIO 102.3 continue as "107.3 Mi Emisora" and not chained to WIAC-FM.

After 102.5 FM changed its name to HOT 102 in August 2011, 107.3 FM adopted again the brand "Toca De Tó" but as a slogan.

On October 9, 2012, WCMN-FM was sold to the HOT 102 brand and as of that very same day, the station acts as a re-transmitter for the HOT brand.

== Logos ==
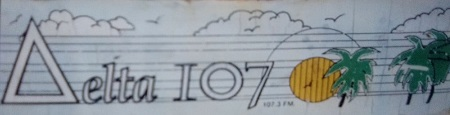
Delta 107

Toca De Tó from 2005 to 2009

Mi Emisora until October 8, 2012
