= Cadena Salsoul =

Radio station in Puerto Rico

- Puerto Rico; Puerto Rico
- Branding: 99.1 Salsoul

Programming
- Format: Salsa
- Affiliations: iHeartMedia (2020–present)

Ownership
- Owner: Uno Radio Group; (Arso Radio Corporation)
- Sister stations: WFID, WZAR, WFDT, WUNO, WPRP, WORA, WCMN, WNEL, WTOK-FM, WCMN-FM, WMIO

History
- First air date: April 1959

Links
- Webcast: Listen live (via iHeartRadio)
- Website: salsoul.com

Cadena Salsoul is an entertainment-focused salsa radio network in Puerto Rico.

The SalSoul Network, made up of two simulcast FM facilities, has been top rated in every significant demographic since 1986. In the important age groups, the network often doubled the audience of the number two station in this market of 125 stations and 3.5 million persons.

The WPRM-FM and WIVA-FM network made up the first instance in the U.S. of using two FM signals to cover all of a large market. WPRM covers San Juan and Ponce; WIVA covers Mayagüez and Arecibo. They also added WRIO Ponce to the network. Together, they cover the "consolidated" market favored by advertising agencies. In a survey conducted in 2015, listeners ranked them the third best station, after KQ 105 FM and Z-93 FM. Through use of parallel clustering, spots could be sold locally on either signal for smaller retail accounts.

Since 26 December 2012, and after 53 years broadcasting on the frequency of 98.5 FM, the radio station, with the approval of the Federal Communications Commission in the United States, has changed to 99.1 FM for the best coverage.

== Programming ==
- Salsoteca
- El Gobierno de la Mañana
- El Bello y La Bestia
- El Piquete
- La Joda

== Transmitters ==
Cadena Salsoul transmitters
Call sign	Frequency	City of license	Facility ID	ERP (W)	HAAT	Class	Transmitter coordinates	Founded	Former call signs
WPRM-FM	99.1 FM (Note: 98.5 MHz from 1959 to 2012)	San Juan	2875	25,000	855.0 meters (2,805.1 ft)	B	18°56′46.5″N 66°03′06.4″W	April 1959	—
WIVA-FM	100.3 FM	Aguadilla	2876	23,000	852.0 meters (2,795.3 ft)	B	18°59′10.2″N 66°59′22.4″W	March 1964	WABA-FM (1964–1972)
WRIO	101.1 FM	Ponce	20591	50,000	805.0 meters (2,641.1 ft)	B	18°51′39.9″N 66°39′14″W	1983	WMTT (1983–1986)
