= WTOK-FM =

Radio station based in San Juan, Puerto Rico

- San Juan, Puerto Rico; Puerto Rico
- Broadcast area: San Juan, Puerto Rico
- Frequency: 102.5 MHz
- Branding: HOT 102.5

Programming
- Languages: Spanish and English
- Format: Top 40/CHR

Ownership
- Owner: Uno Radio Group; (WIAC-FM, Inc.)
- Sister stations: WMIO; WCMN-FM; WFID; WZAR; WFDT; WPRM-FM; WIVA-FM; WRIO; WUNO; WPRP; WORA; WCMN; WNEL

History
- First air date: 1961
- Former call signs: WIAC-FM (1961–2010)
- Call sign meaning: To K from Toca

Technical information
- Licensing authority: FCC
- Facility ID: 4936
- Class: B
- ERP: 50,000 watts
- HAAT: 854.0 meters (2,801.8 ft)
- Transmitter coordinates: 18°16′47″N 65°56′41″W

Links
- Public license information: Public file; LMS
- Webcast: Listen live (via iHeartRadio)
- Website: www.hot102pr.com

WTOK-FM (102.5 FM), branded on-air as HOT 102.5, is a radio station broadcasting a bilingual Top 40/CHR format. This station is based in San Juan, Puerto Rico, is owned by Uno Radio Group and its license is held by Jesus Soto's WIAC-FM, Inc.

== WTOK-FM history ==
During most of its history, WTOK-FM was called "Sistema 102" and the call sign was WIAC-FM. On January 9, 2009, MSG acquired WIAC-FM and at same time the Toca De To' brand. On January 16, 2009, Toca De To' launched on WIAC-FM 102.5 FM. On July 27, 2010, MSG Radio Inc., changed the call sign to WTOK-FM referred to the word "Toca". On July 4, 2011, began a new programming under the name of "HOT 102"

== Toca De To' ==
The Toca De To' brand launched in May 2004 after Uno Radio Group acquired WCMN-FM. During most of its history WCMN-FM was called "Delta 107". In May 2004, WCMN-FM changed its brand name from "107.3 Delta" to just "107.3" and added the "Toca De To'" slogan which eventually became the new brand name.

In March 2007, Uno Radio Group officially acquired WMIO from Bestov Broadcasting (previously known as Audioactiva 102.3 FM) and chained it with WCMN-FM.

On January 9, 2009, MSG Radio Inc. acquired WIAC-FM from Bestov Broadcasting and signed a shared services agreement with Uno Radio Group which allows MSG Radio Inc. to use the brand Toca De To' on January 16, 2009. Old Toca De To' stations WCMN-FM 107.3 and WMIO 102.3 continue as "107.3 Mi Emisora" and do not simulcast WIAC-FM.

On July 27, 2010, MSG Radio Inc., changed the call sign to WTOK-FM, which referred to the word "Toca" (this was not to be confused with the ABC-affiliated television station in Meridian, Mississippi, which has used the WTOK call sign since its inception in 1953).

== HOT 102 ==
On July 4, 2011, began a new programming under the name of "HOT 102", leaving behind the brand "Toca De To'". The new format of the station is an American CHR, featuring a heavily Rhythmic/Dance-leaning direction but includes Pop songs. On August 20, 2011, and after 102.5 FM change its name to Hot 102, 107.3 FM adopted again the brand "Toca De To" but this time as a slogan.

On September 21, 2012, Jesus Soto acquired WTOK-FM from MSG Radio, through licensee WIAC-FM, Inc.

On October 9, 2012, WTOK-FM acquired Mi Emisora brand and as off that very same day, the latter acts as a re-transmitter for the HOT brand.

On September 20, 2017, following the passage of Hurricane Maria across the island. WTOK-FM was forced to go off the air, but returned afterwards once power was restored to the island.

== Programming ==
- Hot 102 Weekend Special
