= IHeartRadio =

American internet radio platform

iHeartRadio
- Type: Internet radio; Podcast publisher; Music recommender system
- Country: United States (including Puerto Rico); Australia; New Zealand; Canada; Mexico
- Headquarters: San Antonio, Texas, U.S.
- Owner: iHeartMedia
- Key people: Bob Pittman (Chairman/CEO, iHeartMedia, Inc.); Rich Bressler (President, Chief Operating Officer and Chief Financial Officer, in iHeartRadio, Inc.; CEO, iHeartMedia Multiplatform Group); Conal Byrne (CEO, Digital Audio Group, iHeartMedia Inc.)
- Launch date: August 1, 2008; 18 years ago
- Affiliations: Abilene Christian University; Advanced Media Partners, LLC; Alaska Public Media; Alvin Community College; American Family Association; American General Media; ANCO Media Group; Arizona Western College; Arkansas State University; Armada Media Corporation; ARN Australia; Atlantic Coast Radio; Audacy, Inc.; Bahakel Communications; Beasley Broadcast Group; Bell Media; Bible Broadcasting Network; Boise State University; Bott Radio Network; Bristol Broadcasting Company; Broadway Media; Calvary Chapel Association; Central Michigan University; Central Texas College; CNN/Warner Bros. Discovery; Colorado Public Radio; Connoisseur Media; Cox Radio; Crawford Broadcasting; Cromwell Radio Group; Cumulus Media; Davidson College; Draper Holdings Business Trust; Diocese of Saint Petersburg; East Baton Rouge Parish School System; Eastern New Mexico University; Elizabeth City State University; Emmis Communications; Entravision Communications; Evanov Radio Group; Federated Media; Forcht Broadcasting; Georgia Public Broadcasting; Good Karma Sports; Griffin Media; Gulf Coast State College; Hall Communications; Howard University; Hub City Radio; Hubbard Broadcasting; Hutchinson Community College; Iliad Media Group; Interlochen Center for the Arts; Iowa Public Radio; Isothermal Community College; JVC Media; Koahnic Broadcast Corporation; Kroenke Sports & Entertainment; Lane Community College; Leighton Media; Lincoln University; Live365; Louisiana State University Shreveport; LSU New Orleans; Max Media; Mereulo Media; Middle Tennessee State University; Midwest Communications; Mid-West Family Broadcasting; Minnesota Christian Broadcasters; Minnesota Public Radio; Mississippi State University; Missouri State University; Monticello Media; Moody Bible Institute; Morehead State University; Morgan Murphy Media; Murray State University; Nevada Public Radio; New Orleans Jazz & Heritage Festival; Nexstar Media Group; Nez Perce; North Carolina Central University; North Carolina State University; Northern Michigan University; Northwestern Media; NRG Media; NZME; Pamal Broadcasting; Pensacola Christian College; Perry Publishing and Broadcasting; Pittsburg State University; Prairie Winds Broadcasting, Inc.; Radio Dubuque; Radio Training Network; Real Presence Radio; Relevant Radio; Renda Media; Saga Communications; Salem Media Group; San Carlos Apache Indian Reservation; Seven Mountains Media; Seventh-day Adventist Church; South Carolina Educational Television; South Carolina Public Radio; Southeast Missouri State University; Southern Oregon University; Sovereign Communications; Spanish Broadcasting System; St. Lawrence University; Stephens Media Group; SummitMedia; Taxi Productions; Telesouth Communications; Texas A&M University; Texas Southern University; The Chickasaw Nation; The HomeSlice Group; Turner Broadcasting; Today (American TV program); Tri-County Broadcasting; Uforia Audio Network; University of Alabama; University of Alaska Fairbanks; University of Arizona; University of Arkansas; University of Arkansas at Little Rock; University of Florida; University of Kansas; University of Louisiana at Lafayette; University of Missouri–Kansas City; University of Missouri–St. Louis; University of Montana; University of New Mexico; University of North Texas; University of Oklahoma; University of South Florida; University of Tennessee; University of West Florida; Uno Radio Group; Urban One; VCY America; Virginia Tech; Walla Walla University; Western Iowa Tech Community College; Wichita State University; Withers Broadcasting; World Radio Missionary Fellowship, Inc.
- Official website: iHeartRadio

iHeartRadio (often shortened to iHeart) is the flagship brand of iHeartMedia, an American mass media company. First used in August 2008 to market Clear Channel Communications' freemium radio and music streaming service, the umbrella brand was progressively broadened to encompass Clear Channel's national radio network and other consumer-facing ventures, culminating with Clear Channel itself rebranding as iHeartMedia in 2014. Its main radio competitors are Audacy, TuneIn and SiriusXM.

== History ==
iHeartRadio is owned by iHeartMedia, which was rebranded from Clear Channel in 2014. Prior to 2008, Clear Channel Communications' various audio products were decentralized. Individual stations streamed from their own sites (or, in many cases, did not, owing to voluminous syndication and local advertising clearance issues), and the Format Lab website provided feeds of between 40 and 80 networks that were used primarily on Clear Channel's HD Radio subchannels, many of which transitioned to iHeartRadio unchanged. In August 2008, Clear Channel launched the iHeartMusic website, featuring entertainment news, national news, music content including albums, singles on demand, music videos, and access to over 750 Clear Channel radio stations online.

On October 7, 2008, Clear Channel Radio launched the first version of iHeartRadio iPhone OS app. 12 radio stations in 8 markets were included in this first release. In 2009, iHeartRadio was made available to BlackBerry devices and the Android operating system and then Sonos in 2010. September 2011 marked the official launch of the free, all-in-one iHeartRadio service featuring thousands of live radio stations and custom artist stations. The launch coincided with the inaugural iHeartRadio Music Festival, the annual two-day event hosted by Ryan Seacrest at the MGM Grand Las Vegas.

The app was expanded to the Xbox 360 and webOS. On April 20, 2012, iHeartRadio launched on the iPad. On June 8, 2012, iHeartRadio concluded a deal to power Yahoo! Music's Radio service, previously powered by CBS Radio.

In mid-October 2012, iHeartRadio launched online audio news, weather and traffic streams for major American metropolitan areas, branded as "24/7 News". On March 1, 2013, iHeartRadio was added to the Roku digital media receiver. As of 2019, the app was available on more than 250 devices and platforms.

In July 2013, iHeartRadio began adding stations from outside the United States like CHUM-FM and CFBT-FM in Canada and Virgin Radio Dubai in the United Arab Emirates. On July 14, 2013, iHeartRadio launched in New Zealand and Australia.

On July 24, 2013, iHeartRadio launched a new talk radio feature: iHeartRadio Talk. It featured original on-demand programming from celebrities like Ryan Seacrest and allowed users to upload their own content through Spreaker. In 2014, the iHeartRadio Talk feature was renamed "Shows & Personalities" in 2014 and "Podcasts" in 2016.

On November 10, 2015, iHeartRadio launched a spin-off app known as iHeartRadio Family—a curated experience targeting children. It features a simplified interface and a selection of age-appropriate stations (such as Radio Disney, and stations curated by artists and personalities popular among the demographic). Build-A-Bear Workshop served as a launch sponsor for the app, which included the addition of a "Build-a-Bear Workshop Radio" channel in the app.

In 2016, iHeartMedia announced subscription based on demand services "iHeartRadio Plus" and "iHeartRadio all Access powered by Napster". On December 1, 2016, iHeartMedia launched the services in beta on iOS and Android to the American users.

iHeartRadio launched in Canada on October 7, 2016, in association with Bell Media.

At the 2017 Consumer Electronics Show, iHeartRadio expanded Plus and All Access to other platforms including desktop.

iHeartRadio launched in Mexico on October 29, 2018, in association with Grupo ACIR.

Parent company iHeartMedia filed for bankruptcy in 2018, due in part to competition from Spotify and SiriusXM.

From the start of service, many of its own radio stations that identified with a callsign and the metro area they serve have the end tag that identifies them as "An iHeartRadio Station", or for live national music stations such as Eclectic Rock or iHeart80s, their end tags identify them as "An iHeartRadio Original Station" (they also ID the HD2/HD3 stations that simulcast). Though starting in 2019, iHeartRadio introduces its own "Sonic Logo", a five-note sounder with two heartbeats at the end. It includes specific variations (including vocal versions) for different formats or productions.

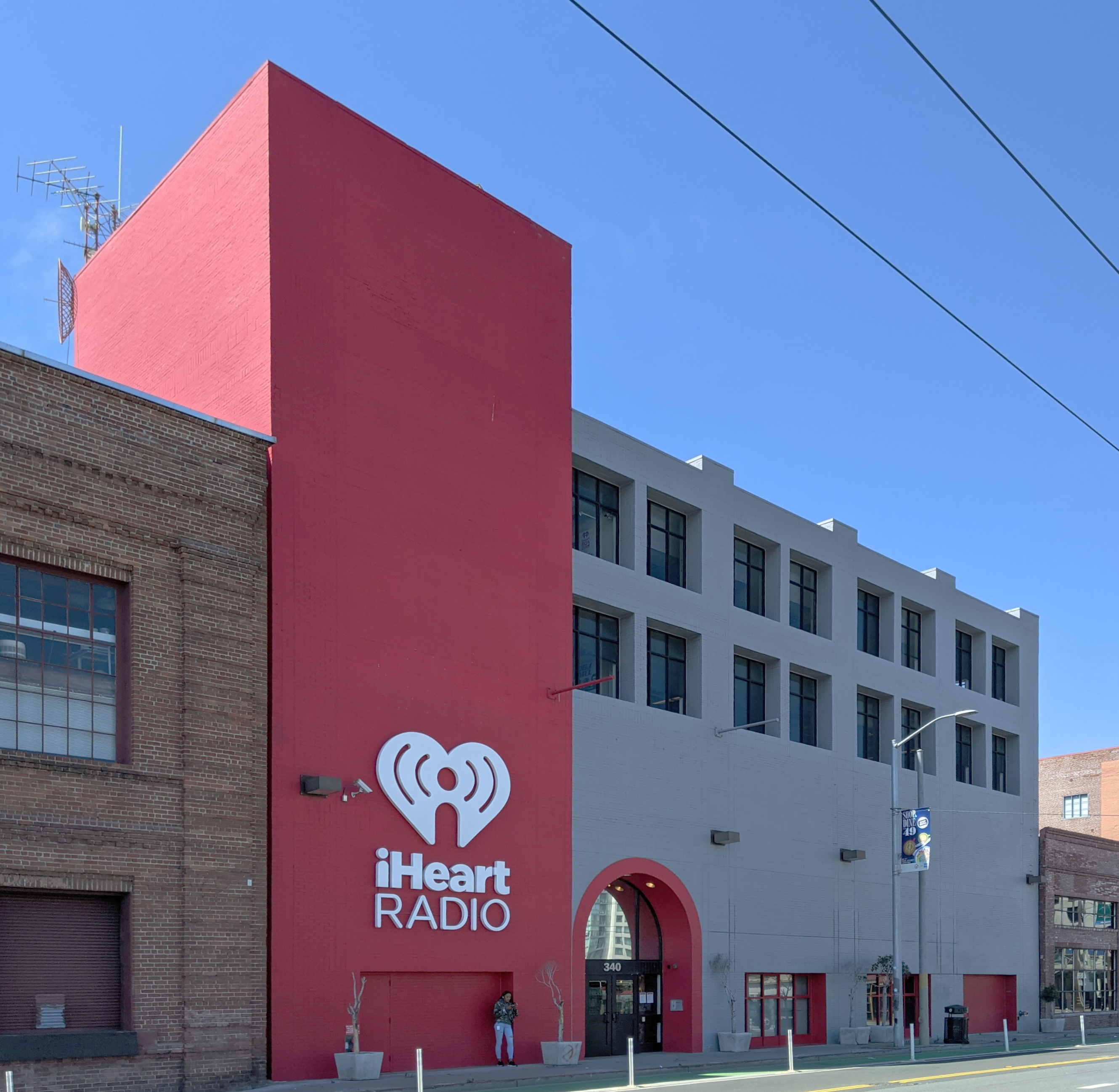
iHeartRadio offices in San Francisco

In 2019, The New York Times described iHeartRadio as the largest radio broadcaster in the United States, with 848 terrestrial stations. While being considered for purchase by Liberty Media in early 2020, iHeart fired employees en masse in what the bankrupt company described as technology-driven layoffs. Reporting on the number of firings ranged from dozens or hundreds to "as many as 850" or more than 1,000 of its then-12,500 employees.

On April 23, 2020, the iHeartRadio app was launched in association with Uno Radio Group, which owns the NotiUno, Salsoul, Fidelity and Hot 102 brands in Puerto Rico.

On December 1, 2021, iHeartRadio signed a deal with Roku to provide The Roku Channel a dozen live radio stations as FAST channels with Music Choice-style imagery.

On September 27, 2023, the Minnesota Timberwolves and Lynx announced that their radio broadcasts would move to the iHeartRadio app, with the majority of Lynx games and some Timberwolves games simulcast on co-owned KFXN-FM.

=== Acquisitions ===
In September 2018, iHeartMedia announced it would acquire U.S. podcast publisher Stuff Media, LLC, formerly the podcast publishing division of HowStuffWorks, for $55 million.

As of 2022, iHeartRadio is the leading podcast publisher on Podtrac, with over 400 million downloads each month. In November 2018, iHeart also bought Jelli. In October 2020, it was announced that the company would acquire Voxnest, the parent company of Spreaker, a podcast-hosting company. Among podcast feeds whose oldest episode dates from 2025, 106,699 were hosted on Spreaker and 86,799 on Anchor, according to a count of the Podcast Index feed list taken in August 2026. iHeart has since also bought Triton Digital from Scripps. In February 2022, iHeartMedia invested in Sounder.

== Availability and supported devices ==
iHeartRadio is available in Australia, Canada, the United States, Puerto Rico, Mexico, and New Zealand, but blocks access from others such as Britain.

Launched in 2011, the iHeartRadio app has more than 188 million registered users and is available on over 500 platforms and over 2,000 different connected devices — including smart speakers, digital auto dashes, tablets, wearables, smartphones, virtual assistants, televisions and gaming consoles.

In 2024, iHeartMedia made major changes to the iHeartRadio apps' user interface. The changes were intended to mimic features from a car radio, including tuners, live radio, and song lyrics.

== Functionality and rating system ==
Listeners can hear live radio stations, personalized music stations, create playlists, listen to podcasts and more. The iHeartRadio player has a Like/Dislike (Thumbs Up/Thumbs Down) rating tool used on songs playing on live and customized radio stations. "Liking" or "disliking" songs for all live stations provides feedback to the station being played. "Liking" a song on customized stations will have it and songs like it played more often. "Disliking" a song on customized stations means that song will not be played again. This data is used to personalize users' "My Favorites Radio" station. As My Favorites Radio learns a user's music taste over time, it adds various bonus tracks into the mix. Songs can easily be removed from the station.

For a time since the service's beginnings until 2020, iHeartRadio had a "Discovery Tuner" to the custom stations where listeners could adjust the tuner to play familiar songs – or select "Less Familiar" to play a wider variety – or "Mixed".

== International ==
=== Australia & New Zealand ===
Before 2014, iHeartRadio operated Australian Radio Network as a joint venture with APN News and Media but now operates an Australian version wholly owned by ARN Media. New Zealand assets are now licensed by NZME.

=== Canada ===
On January 6, 2016, iHeartMedia announced that the iHeartRadio service would expand into Canada as part of a licensing deal with Bell Media. The company described the Canadian version of the service as being a "franchised" operation; Bell handles Canadian music licensing, marketing, and distribution of the service, and provides content from its properties. Bell also gained rights to organize Canadian versions of the company's branded events, such as the Jingle Ball, and co-branded the annual awards show organized through its cable channel Much as the iHeartRadio Much Music Video Awards.

The service went live in Canada on October 7, 2016, and on December 4, 2017, additional features were added to the service, including podcasts, additional stations, and a deal with Evanov Radio Group to add its stations to the service. Stingray Radio similarly joined in June 2023, followed by Corus Entertainment in May 2024, Pattison Media in November 2024, and Vista Radio in April 2025.

Its main competitor is Radioplayer Canada, which is backed by a consortium of other Canadian radio broadcasters.

=== Mexico ===
iHeartMedia announced iHeartRadio's expansion to Mexico on October 29, 2018, through an exclusive partnership with Grupo ACIR, a Mexican broadcasting company. iHeartRadio México includes all 56 Grupo ACIR and 850 iHeartMedia live broadcast radio stations from across Mexico and the U.S., including music, news/talk, comedy and sports content. Through the expansion, listeners also have access to all of iHeartMedia's exclusive digital-only iHeartRadio Original stations spanning all genres of music, as well as Grupo ACIR's own offer of digital-only stations featuring the most popular genres in Mexico. Users can also access the top English and Spanish language podcasts and on-air personalities.

== Brand expansion ==
Clear Channel/iHeartMedia built its national event franchise around the iHeartRadio consumer brand, beginning with the iHeartRadio Music Festival in 2011. The next year, the annual Jingle Ball concert in Los Angeles was expanded into a national iHeartRadio Jingle Ball Tour. Other music festivals followed: the iHeartRadio Country Festival, iHeartRadio Fiesta Latina, and ALTer Ego.

Programming produced under iHeartRadio billing includes iHeartRadio Countdown, the iHeartRadio Music Awards, and the iHeartRadio Podcast Awards. As of around 2017, iHeartMedia also operated iHeartRadio Theaters in Los Angeles and New York City. The iHeartRadio Theater in New York City, formerly the P. C. Richard & Son Theater, is a ground floor 250-seat theater at 32 Avenue of the Americas. The iHeartRadio Theater Los Angeles, located at The Burbank Studios in Burbank, opened in 2013. The theater is a converted soundstage that was previously used by The Tonight Show with Jay Leno. Both theaters are generally used for private promotional performances, with attendees exclusively consisting of radio contest winners, VIPs, and the like.
