= WMTI =

WMTI may refer to:

- WMTI (AM), a radio station (1160 AM) licensed to serve Barceloneta and Manatí, Puerto Rico
- WBQN, a radio station (1580 AM) licensed to serve Aguadilla, Puerto Rico, which held the call sign WMTI for most of the period between 1981 and 2004, and for most of the period between 2015 and 2016
- WRKN (FM), a radio station (106.1) licensed to serve Picayune, Mississippi, United States, which held the call sign WMTI from 2006 to 2015
