= WAPA (AM) =

Radio station licensed to San Juan, Puerto Rico

- San Juan, Puerto Rico; Puerto Rico
- Broadcast area: Puerto Rico
- Frequency: 680 kHz
- Branding: WAPA Radio

Programming
- Format: News-talk
- Affiliations: CNN en Español

Ownership
- Owner: Wifredo G. Blanco-Pi; (NotiRadio Broadcasting, LLC)
- Sister stations: WBQN, WMIA, WMTI, WOSO, WVOZ, WXRF

History
- First air date: January 15, 1947; 79 years ago
- Former call signs: WAPA (1946–2022); WBQN (2022–2024)
- Call sign meaning: Asociación de Productores de Azúcar (Puerto Rico Sugar Growers' Association)

Technical information
- Licensing authority: FCC
- Facility ID: 8889
- Class: B
- Power: 10,000 watts day; 9,500 watts night
- Transmitter coordinates: 18°24′16″N 65°56′52″W
- Translator: 95.3 W237FF (San Juan)

Links
- Public license information: Public file; LMS
- Website: waparadio.com

WAPA (680 kHz) is an AM radio station licensed to San Juan, Puerto Rico, broadcasting a news-talk format. The station serves as the flagship station of the WAPA Radio News Network and is owned by Wifredo G. Blanco-Pi (d/b/a NotiRadio Broadcasting, LLC). It is an affiliate of CNN en Español radio news network. The station is rebroadcast at 95.3 FM by translator station W237FF, also located in San Juan.

WAPA's programming is heard on over seven AM radio stations and their associated FM translators across the island:

Call sign	Frequency	City of license	FCC info
WAPA	680 AM	San Juan, Puerto Rico	FCC (WAPA)
WVOZ	1260 AM	Ponce, Puerto Rico	FCC (WVOZ)
WOSO	1300 AM	Mayaguez, Puerto Rico	FCC (WOSO)
WMIA	1070 AM	Arecibo, Puerto Rico	FCC (WMIA)
WBQN	1580 AM	Aguadilla, Puerto Rico	FCC (WBQN)
WXRF	1590 AM	Guayama, Puerto Rico	FCC (WXRF)
WMTI	1160 AM	Barceloneta-Manati, Puerto Rico	FCC (WMTI)

Broadcast translator for WAPA
Call sign	Frequency	City of license	FID	ERP (W)	FCC info
W237FF	95.3 FM	San Juan, Puerto Rico	202163	250	LMS

Broadcast translator for WVOZ
Call sign	Frequency	City of license	FID	ERP (W)	FCC info
W268DJ	101.5 FM	Ponce, Puerto Rico	202168	250	LMS

Broadcast translator for WOSO
Call sign	Frequency	City of license	FID	ERP (W)	FCC info
W265EC	100.9 FM	Mayaguez, Puerto Rico	202165	250	LMS

Broadcast translator for WMIA
Call sign	Frequency	City of license	FID	ERP (W)	FCC info
W227DY	93.3 FM	Arecibo, Puerto Rico	202161	180	LMS

Broadcast translator for WMTI
Call sign	Frequency	City of license	FID	ERP (W)	FCC info
W287DR	105.3 FM	Barceloneta, Puerto Rico	202952	210	LMS

Broadcast translator for WBQN
Call sign	Frequency	City of license	FID	ERP (W)	FCC info
W286DL	105.1 FM	Aguadilla, Puerto Rico	202169	250	LMS

Broadcast translator for WXRF
Call sign	Frequency	City of license	FID	ERP (W)	FCC info
W280FS	103.9 FM	Guayama, Puerto Rico	202164	250	LMS

== History ==
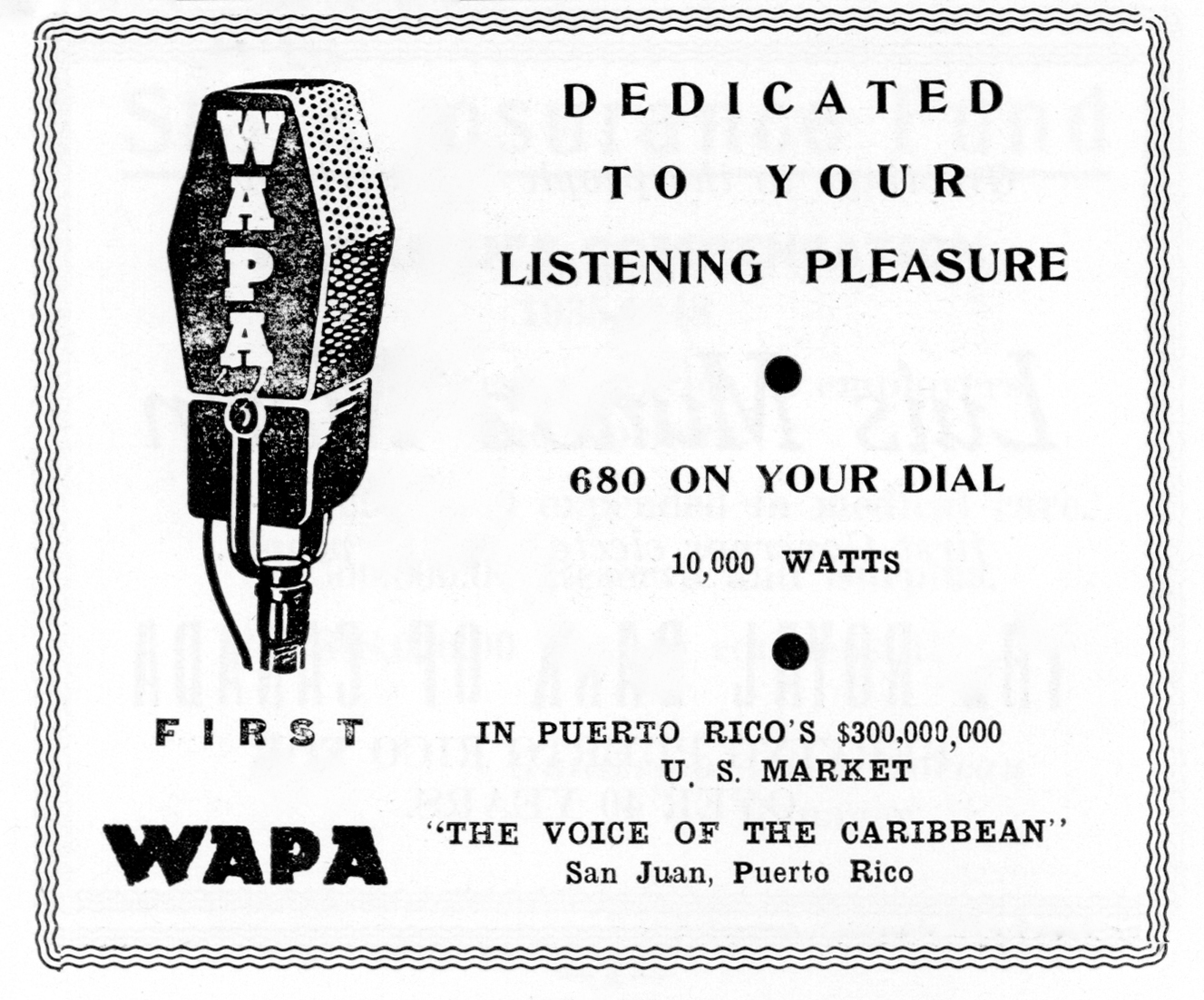
WAPA Advertisement from 1949

The station's original call sign, WAPA, was a partial abbreviation of the station's original owners, the now-defunct Asociación de Productores de Azúcar, or Puerto Rico Sugar Grower's Association. In the late 1960s, it was acquired by Hearst Corporation. In 1991, it was acquired by NotiRadio Broadcasting (Eng. Wifredo G. Blanco-Pi, owner and his son Eng. Jorge Blanco, news director).

In 1996, NotiRadio Broadcasting acquired radio station WISO 1260 in Ponce from South Puerto Rico Broadcasting Corporation (founded by Luis Freyre in 1953); this became the second radio station of the WAPA Radio News Network.

In 2014, after 66 years of local operation, WXRF 1590 AM in Guayama (originally founded by Jose Fuster) was acquired from International Broadcasting Corporation by NotiRadio Broadcasting for $100,000, as the third radio station of WAPA Radio. On March 24, this station changed its call letters to WGYA.

On March 14, 2017, after a year off the air due to transmitter problems, NotiRadio Broadcasting resumed operations of WVOZ 1580 AM in Morovis-Manatí, rejoining the WAPA Radio News Network, since its establishment, 35 years ago in 1981. The station was acquired from International Broadcasting Corporation for $150,000. WVOZ became silent due to technical maintenance and financial reasons in April 2016.

On March 2, 2017, WAPA Radio acquired WMIA 1070 AM in Arecibo (originally owned by Abacoa Radio Corporation) for over $250,000, and the sale was completed on April 14, 2017. On May 1, WMIA became the new "WAPA Radio News Network" station, serving the northern area.

WVOZ changed its community of license from Morovis to Aguadilla, after WI3XSO's license was cancelled on May 8. The community of license move was granted on December 28, 2017. WAPA Radio was now a network of five radio stations across the island.

On June 21, 2017, WTIL 1300 AM in Mayaguez buys for a three-way swap from La Mas Z Radio, Inc., when awaiting the transaction completes, this becomes the sixth radio station of the WAPA Radio News Network on August 1. On August 3, WGYA changed back to the original WXRF call letters. On August 15, the sale of WTIL to Blanco Pi was completed.

WAPA was the only radio station to remain on the air throughout the passage of Hurricane Maria on September 20, 2017. The station helped family members contact each other by relaying messages of safety. WAPA's programming was reduced to 17 and a half hours from 4:45 AM until 9 PM, operating with a diesel generator, that some areas of the transmitters don't have electrical grid. As of 2018, WAPA's programming was heard on weekdays from 4:45 AM to 10 PM, Saturdays from 5 AM to 10 PM and Sundays from 6 AM to 10 PM.

On May 23, 2022, after WAPA-TV acquired radio stations WKAQ (AM) and FM in San Juan, and in order to avoid confusion between unrelated broadcasting entities, branding for "WAPA Radio" was changed to "Borinquen Radio". The WBQN call letters that had been assigned to a station on 1160 AM in Barceloneta-Manatí were moved to the former WAPA at 680 AM in San Juan, and several other call sign changes were made around the network. Another call swap, on October 11, 2024, restored the WAPA call sign to the station.

=== Synchronous relay station ===
Until 2017, WAPA's programming was relayed through an experimental synchronous booster station that also transmitted on 680 kHz: WA2XPA in Arecibo, which was originally licensed September 26, 2003.

On November 7, 2016, the Federal Communications Commission (FCC) stated that the license for WA2XPA would only be renewed for six months, after which the station would be deleted. The reason given was that the station had far exceeded the six-year maximum permitted for experimental authorizations.

On April 19, 2017, the FCC confirmed its ruling that WA2XPA's license would not be renewed. The ruling stated that it must discontinue operation on May 7, 2017 and the license would be cancelled on May 8, 2017.

A petition for review of the cancellation order was submitted on April 24, 2017. The petition was withdrawn on September 5, 2017, and the license was cancelled on May 16, 2018.
