= WXRF =

WAPA news/talk radio station in Guayama, Puerto Rico

- Guayama, Puerto Rico; United States
- Broadcast area: Puerto Rico
- Frequency: 1590 kHz
- Branding: Radio Guayama

Programming
- Format: Spanish talk
- Affiliations: CNN en Español

Ownership
- Owner: Wifredo G. Blanco Pi; (NotiRadio Broadcasting, LLC)
- Sister stations: WAPA, WBQN, WMTI, WMIA, WOSO, WVOZ

History
- First air date: July 23, 1948
- Former call signs: WXRF (1948–2014); WGYA (2014–2017)

Technical information
- Licensing authority: FCC
- Facility ID: 25531
- Class: B
- Power: 1,000 watts
- Transmitter coordinates: 17°57′13″N 66°56′51″W
- Translator: 103.9 W280FS (Guayama)

Links
- Public license information: Public file; LMS
- Website: http://waparadio.com

WXRF (1590 AM, "Radio Guayama") is a radio station licensed to Guayama, Puerto Rico. The station is part of the WAPA Radio News Network and is owned and operated by NotiRadio Broadcasting, LLC, and features programming from CNN en Español. It airs a Spanish-language talk format. The station is shared with translator station W280FS 103.9 FM also in Guayama.

== Call letters ==
The station was assigned the WGYA call letters by the Federal Communications Commission (FCC) on March 24, 2014. It changed back to its original WXRF call sign on August 2, 2017.

== Translator stations ==
Broadcast translator for WXRF
Call sign	Frequency	City of license	FID	ERP (W)	FCC info
W280FS	103.9 FM	Guayama, Puerto Rico	202164	250	LMS
