= WOSO (AM) =

Radio station in Mayagüez, Puerto Rico

- Mayagüez, Puerto Rico; Puerto Rico
- Broadcast area: Puerto Rico
- Frequency: 1300 kHz
- Branding: Radio Oso

Programming
- Format: News talk
- Affiliations: CNN en Español

Ownership
- Owner: Wifredo G. Blanco-Pi; (NotiRadio Broadcasting, LLC)
- Sister stations: WAPA, WBQN, WMIA, WMTI, WVOZ, WXRF

History
- First air date: December 27, 1950; 75 years ago
- Former call signs: WTIL (1950–2024)
- Call sign meaning: "Oso" (Spanish for "bear")

Technical information
- Licensing authority: FCC
- Facility ID: 40780
- Class: B
- Power: 10,000 watts
- Transmitter coordinates: 18°11′50″N 67°10′54″W
- Translator: 100.9 W265EC (Mayagüez)

Links
- Public license information: Public file; LMS
- Website: www.waparadio.com

WOSO (1300 AM), branded on-air as Radio Oso, is a radio station broadcasting a news/talk format. Licensed to Mayaguez, Puerto Rico, it serves the Puerto Rico area. The station is currently owned by NotiRadio Broadcasting, LLC. The station is part of the WAPA Radio News Network and features programming from CNN en Español. The station is shared with translator station W265EC 100.9 FM, also in Mayaguez. WOSO was founded in 1950 by Gilbert Mamery as WTIL, and changed owners over the years. It is the second oldest radio station in the western region.

== Sale to NotiRadio Broadcasting ==
On June 21, 2017, WTIL bought from La Mas Z Radio, Inc. to Wifredo G. Blanco Pi, swapping WBYM 1560 AM in Bayamon to La Mas Z from WTIL, in a three-way swap. The deal also involved International Broadcasting Corporation receiving land and equipment at the site of WAPA 680 AM in Carolina, PR from Blanco Pi and permission to relocate WGIT 1660 AM in Canovanas to that site and build a transmitter building, and IBC may sell or rent at $600 a month the WBYM transmitter site to La Mas Z Radio. On July 31, WTIL ended their local and Spanish Oldies format after 67 years of operation. When the transaction closed and awaiting the consummation, on August 3, this became the sixth radio station of the WAPA Radio News Network. The sale was completed on August 15, 2017.

The WAPA Radio Network now consists of seven AM and seven FM radio stations across the island, WAPA 680 / W237FF 95.3 in San Juan, WMIA 1070 / W227DY 93.3 in Arecibo, WVOZ 1260 / W268DJ 101.5 in Ponce, WOSO 1300 / W265EC 100.9 in Mayaguez, WXRF 1590 / W280FS 103.9 in Guayama, WBQN 1580 / W286DL 105.1 in Aguadilla and WMTI 1160 / W287DR 105.3 in Barceloneta-Manati.

On December 11, 2024, WTIL requested a call sign change to WOSO effective December 17, shortly after the previous WOSO in San Juan lost its license.

== Translator stations ==
Broadcast translator for WOSO
Call sign	Frequency	City of license	FID	ERP (W)	FCC info
W265EC	100.9 FM	Mayaguez, Puerto Rico	202165	250	LMS
