= WMIA (AM) =

WAPA news/talk radio station in Arecibo, Puerto Rico

- Arecibo, Puerto Rico; Puerto Rico
- Frequency: 1070 kHz
- Branding: MIA Radio Arecibo

Programming
- Format: News talk
- Affiliations: CNN Radio

Ownership
- Owner: Wifredo G. Blanco-Pi; (NotiRadio Broadcasting, LLC)
- Sister stations: WAPA, WBQN, WMTI, WOSO, WVOZ, WXRF

History
- First air date: March 14, 1957; 69 years ago
- Call sign meaning: "Mia"

Technical information
- Licensing authority: FCC
- Facility ID: 254
- Class: B
- Power: 6,000 watts
- Transmitter coordinates: 18°27′33″N 66°45′20″W
- Translator: 93.3 W227DY (Arecibo)

Links
- Public license information: Public file; LMS
- Website: www.waparadio.com

WMIA (1070 kHz), branded on-air as MIA Radio Arecibo is an AM radio station licensed to serve Arecibo, Puerto Rico. The station is owned by Wifredo G. Blanco Pi and it is part of the WAPA Radio News Network. It airs a news/talk format and features programming from CNN Radio. The station is shared with translator station W227DY 93.3 FM also in Arecibo.

The station was assigned the WMIA call letters by the Federal Communications Commission.

== Ownership ==
In 1957, WMIA began operations on 1070 kHz. The station was owned and operated by Abacoa Radio Corporation until April 2017.

On March 2, 2017, Wifredo G. Blanco Pi reached an agreement to purchase WMIA from Abacoa Radio Corp. The sale was completed on April 12, 2017.

This becomes the fifth station of the WAPA Radio News Network.

The WAPA Radio Network now consists of seven AM and seven FM radio stations across the island, WAPA 680 / W237FF 95.3 in San Juan, WMIA 1070 / W227DY 93.3 in Arecibo, WVOZ 1260 / W268DJ 101.5 in Ponce, WTIL 1300 / W265EC 100.9 in Mayaguez, WXRF 1590 / W280FS 103.9 in Guayama, WBQN 1580 / W286DL 105.1 in Aguadilla and WMTI 1160 / W287DR 105.3 in Barceloneta-Manati.

== Translator stations ==
Broadcast translator for WMIA
Call sign	Frequency	City of license	FID	ERP (W)	FCC info
W227DY	93.3 FM	Arecibo, Puerto Rico	202161	180	LMS
