= WMTI (AM) =

Radio station in Barceloneta–Manatí, Puerto Rico

Barceloneta–Manatí, Puerto Rico; Puerto Rico
- Broadcast area: Puerto Rico
- Frequency: 1160 kHz
- Branding: Manatí 1160

Programming
- Format: News-talk
- Affiliations: CNN Radio

Ownership
- Owner: Wilfredo G. Blanco-Pi; (NotiRadio Broadcasting, LLC)
- Sister stations: WAPA; WBQN; WMIA; WOSO; WVOZ; WXRF

History
- First air date: March 1, 1975
- Former call signs: WBQN (1974–2022); WAPA (2022); WISO (2022)
- Call sign meaning: "Manatí"

Technical information
- Licensing authority: FCC
- Facility ID: 54502
- Class: B
- Power: 5,000 watts day; 3,500 watts night
- Transmitter coordinates: 18°26′23″N 66°33′7″W
- Translator: 105.3 W287DR (Barceloneta-Manatí)

Links
- Public license information: Public file; LMS
- Website: waparadio.com

WMTI (1160 kHz), branded on-air as Manatí 1160 is an AM radio station broadcasting a News Talk Information format. It is licensed to Barceloneta–Manatí, Puerto Rico, and serves the Puerto Rico area. The station is owned by Wilfredo G. Blanco-Pi and is part of the WAPA Radio News Network. The station is rebroadcast by FM translator W287DR 105.3 FM, also in Barceloneta-Manatí.

The station was assigned the WBQN call letters by the Federal Communications Commission on January 24, 1974. It began broadcasting in March 1975 and was originally owned by Ángel Rivera. The station changed its call sign to WAPA on May 27, 2022, to WISO on June 10, 2022, and then to WMTI on June 24, 2022.

== Translator ==
Broadcast translator for WMTI
Call sign	Frequency	City of license	FID	ERP (W)	FCC info
W287DR	105.3 FM	Barceloneta–Manatí, Puerto Rico	202952	210	LMS
