= WVOZ (AM) =

Radio station licensed to Ponce, Puerto Rico

- Ponce, Puerto Rico; United States
- Broadcast area: Puerto Rico
- Frequency: 1260 kHz
- Branding: Radio Señorial

Programming
- Format: Talk radio

Ownership
- Owner: Wilfredo G. Blanco Pi; (NotiRadio Broadcasting, LLC)
- Sister stations: WAPA, WBQN, WMIA, WMTI, WOSO, WXRF

History
- First air date: September 15, 1953
- Former call signs: WISO (1953–2022); WAPA (2022–2024); WBQN (2024)
- Call sign meaning: "Voz" is the Spanish word for "voice"

Technical information
- Licensing authority: FCC
- Facility ID: 61147
- Class: B
- Power: 2,300 watts
- Transmitter coordinates: 17°59′53″N 66°38′12″W
- Translator: 101.5 W268DJ (Ponce)

Links
- Public license information: Public file; LMS
- Website: waparadio.com

WVOZ (1260 AM, "Radio Señorial") is an radio station broadcasting a talk format as part of the "WAPA Radio News Network". Licensed to Ponce, Puerto Rico, the station is owned by Wilfredo G. Blanco Pi, licensed to NotiRadio Broadcasting, LLC.

Its programming is also carried by FM translator station W268DJ at 101.5 MHz, also in Ponce.

== History ==
The station was first licensed, as WISO, in 1953 to the South Puerto Rico Broadcasting Company.

On May 23, 2022, after WAPA-TV acquired radio stations WKAQ (AM) and FM in San Juan, and in order to avoid confusion between unrelated broadcasting entities, branding for "WAPA Radio" was changed to "Borinquen Radio". The WBQN call letters that had been assigned to a station on 1160 AM in Barceloneta-Manatí were moved to the former WAPA at 680 AM in San Juan on May 27, and several other call sign changes were made around the network. One resulting change occurred on June 14, 2022, when WISO's call sign was changed to WAPA. The call sign was changed again in October 2024: to WBQN on October 11, and to WVOZ on October 18.

=== Synchronous relay stations ===
Until 2017, WISO's programming was relayed through two experimental synchronous booster stations that also transmitted on 1260 kHz: WI2XSO, originally licensed June 6, 1999, in Mayaguez, and WI3XSO, originally licensed October 22, 2002, in Aguadilla.

On November 7, 2016, the Federal Communications Commission (FCC) stated that the licenses for WI2XSO and WI3XSO would only be renewed for six months, after which the stations would be deleted. The reason given was that both stations had far exceeded the six-year maximum permitted for experimental authorizations. Petitions for review of the order to cancel the licenses was submitted on November 23, 2016, and April 24, 2017. However, they were unsuccessful, and the licenses for both WI2XSO and WI3XSO were deleted on May 16, 2017.

In 2018, a second station, WVOZ (1580 AM), changed its community of license from Morovis to Aguadilla, and began broadcasting from the former WI3XSO facility.

== Translator stations ==
Broadcast translator for WVOZ
Call sign	Frequency	City of license	FID	ERP (W)	FCC info
W268DJ	101.5 FM	Ponce, Puerto Rico	202168	250	LMS
