= WBQN =

News and talk radio station in Puerto Rico

- Aguadilla, Puerto Rico; Puerto Rico
- Broadcast area: Puerto Rico
- Frequency: 1580 kHz
- Branding: Radio Borinquen

Programming
- Format: News talk
- Affiliations: CNN en Español

Ownership
- Owner: Wifredo G. Blanco-Pi; (NotiRadio Broadcasting, LLC)
- Sister stations: WAPA, WMIA, WMTI, WOSO, WVOZ, WXRF

History
- First air date: May 6, 1981; 44 years ago
- Former call signs: WCQC (1981–1987); WMTI (1988–1994); WGFE (1994); WMTI (1994–2002); WTCV (2002); WMTI (2002–2004); WEKO (2004–2015); WMTI (2015–2016); WGFE (2016); WMTI (2016); WVOZ (2016–2024)
- Call sign meaning: Borinquen, the native name for the island of Puerto Rico

Technical information
- Licensing authority: FCC
- Facility ID: 72452
- Class: B
- Power: 1,000 watts
- Transmitter coordinates: 18°20′32″N 66°25′58″W
- Translator: 105.1 W286DL (Aguadilla)

Links
- Public license information: Public file; LMS
- Website: www.waparadio.com

WBQN (1580 AM), branded on-air as Radio Borinquen is a radio station broadcasting a news talk format. Licensed to Aguadilla, Puerto Rico, it serves the Western Puerto Rico area. The station is part of the WAPA Radio News Network and it is currently owned by NotiRadio Broadcasting, LLC, managed by Wifredo G. Blanco-Pi. The station is shared with translator station W286DL 105.1 FM also in Aguadilla.

== History ==
WBQN (as WCQC) was founded in 1981 by Cuban station engineer Wifredo G. Blanco-Pi. The station was originally licensed to Morovis, Puerto Rico and It was the first station nationwide to operate an experimental synchronous booster at Manati, P.R. in 1987. Blanco-Pi had to sell the station in 1991 to acquire WAPA 680 AM in order to expand the NotiRadio Network. The experience he acquired with WCQC's experimental synchronous booster made him possible to expand the NotiRadio network using this technology.

=== Sale to International Broadcasting Corporation ===
In 1988, WCQC was sold to International Broadcasting Corporation, changing the call sign to WMTI and would become a full service radio station. In 1994, the station changed to WGFE, branded as Radio G-FE, later switched back to WMTI. In 1996, WMTI was sold to Wanda Rolon, and broadcasts religious programming. 2 years later, in 1998 the station was sold back to the previous owner, International Broadcasting Corporation, joining the Cadena Radio Voz network. In 2003, the station once again changed its call letters to WEKO, and would become Radio Eko, focusing on a local basis. In 2014, WEKO started religious programming from Faro de Santidad and in 2015, the WMTI callsign returned on the 1580 AM dial. On June 22, 2016, WMTI went silent due to transmitter repairs and technical reasons.

=== WAPA Radio returns to 1580 AM ===
Blanco-Pi purchased WMTI on August 1, 2016, the day that WMTI was silent, preparing its return to the WAPA Radio News Network. On November 11, the station changed its callsign to WVOZ. On March 13, 2017, after 1 year off the air, WVOZ resumed operations from its new transmitter in Morovis, broadcasting the full WAPA Radio News Network schedule.

=== WVOZ moves to Aguadilla ===
On March 27, 2017, WVOZ filed an application that would change its city of license to Aguadilla and will move to the existing facility of WI3XSO, which shut down on May 7, and cancelled its license on May 8, 2017. The construction permit to move their city of license from Morovis to Aguadilla was granted on December 28, 2017. The city of license to Aguadilla was granted on December 28, 2018.

On October 18, 2024, WVOZ swapped call signs with WBQN (1260 AM) in Ponce.

== Translator stations ==
Broadcast translator for WBQN
Call sign	Frequency	City of license	FID	ERP (W)	FCC info
W286DL	105.1 FM	Aguadilla, Puerto Rico	202169	250	LMS
