= List of newspapers in Puerto Rico =

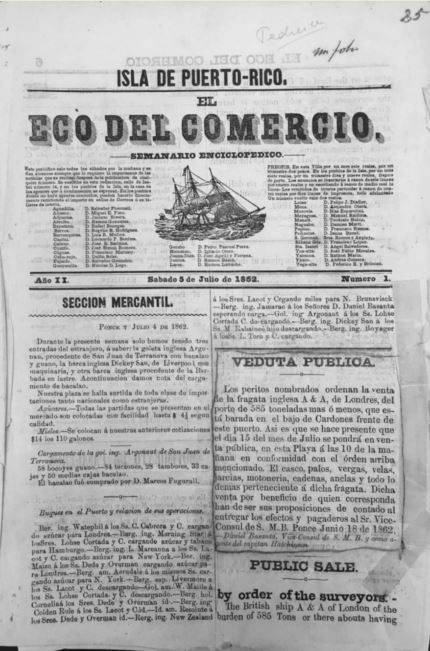
The 5 July 1852 cover page of "El Eco del Comercio", a newspaper published in Ponce between 1857 and 1867

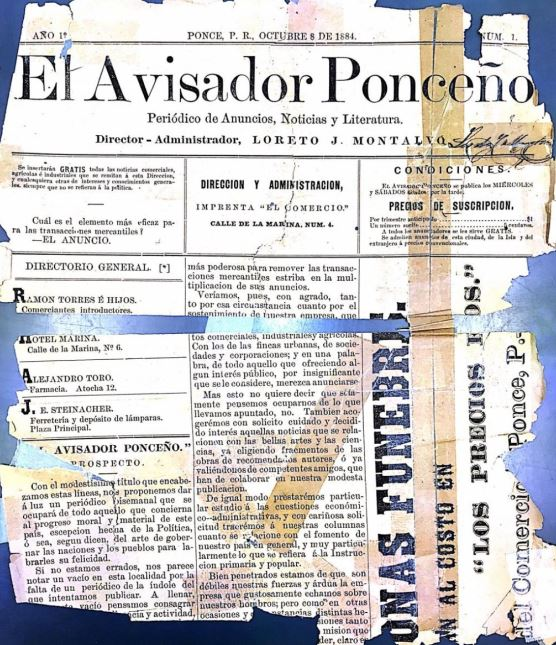
The 8 October 1884 issue of El Avisador Ponceño

This is a list of newspapers in Puerto Rico. Unless otherwise indicated, all papers are published in the Spanish language.

== List of newspapers ==
Title	Locale	Year est.	Publisher/parent company	Notes
Caribbean Business	San Juan		Latin Media House LLC	Weekly (island-wide). English language.
Claridad	San Juan	1959		Weekly (island-wide). Digitized copies available at Newspaper Digital Library: Digital Library of the Caribbean (Claridad).
De Todo	Carolina	1979		Regional
Es Noticia	Ponce	2015	SCC Comunicaciones LLC	Regional; Online with a printed biweekly version
La Esquina	Maunabo			Regional
El Laurel Sureño (Note: DBA, Periódico El Laurel, aka, "PEL")	Ponce	2010	El Laurel Sureño, Inc.	Regional
News Is My Business		2010 (Nov)	News Is My Business	Online. English language.
NotiCel	San Juan	2011	O2 Comunicaciones Inc	Online
Noticias Sur P.R.	Ponce	2010 (September)	Noticias Sur PR LLC	Online
El Nuevo Día	Guaynabo	1970	GFR Media	Daily (island-wide); Print copies are available at Archivo Histórico Municipal de Ponce (entire printed collection)
La Opinión del Sur	Ponce	2001	Periódico El Oriental, Inc.	Regional
La Perla del Sur	Ponce	1982 (3–7 Nov)	La Perla del Sur, Inc.	Regional. Omar Alfonso, editor. Print copies are available at Pontificia Universidad Católica de Puerto Rico Library (Unknown holdings) and Archivo Histórico Municipal de Ponce (entire printed collection)
Presencia	Carolina			Regional
Primera Hora	Guaynabo	1997		Daily (island-wide); Print copies are available at Archivo Histórico Municipal de Ponce (entire printed collection)
The San Juan Daily Star	San Juan			Online. English language.
Tribunal del Pueblo	Gurabo	2018		Online
El Vocero	San Juan	1974		Daily (island-wide); Print copies are available at Archivo Histórico Municipal de Ponce (entire printed collection)
Voces del Sur	Ponce	2010	Nexo Comunicaciones Inc.	Regional
El Sol de Puerto Rico	Ponce	2012	Periódico El Sol de Puerto Rico	Regional

== Defunct newspapers ==
=== 19th century ===
Title	Locale	Year est.	Year ceased	Availability	Notes
Gaceta de Puerto Rico	San Juan	1806	1902	Digitized issues available at Newspaper Digital Library: Digital Library of the Caribbean (Gazeta ('sic') de Puerto Rico). and on the Library of Congress website. Digitized issues also available at Colección Puertorriqueña.	Official organ of the Government of Puerto Rico.
Diario Económico de Puerto Rico	San Juan	1814			Founded by Alejandro Ramírez. Issued by the Sociedad Económica de Amigos del País en Puerto Rico
El Ponceño: periódico literario mercantil y de avisos	Ponce	1852 (Jul 10)	1854 (Jul 22) (Note: In what appears to be a typo, on 25 July 2012, La Perla del Sur reported "El Ponceño" closed on "22 June 1854". See Conmemoran la fundación de El Ponceño. by Reinaldo Millán.)	Microfilm and photocopies are available at the University of Puerto Rico at Ponce Adelina Coppin Alvarado Library (numbers 1–51 of 1852–1853 and numbers 50–108 of 1853–1854). Print copies are available at UPR-JML Library (v.1, no.3 (Jul 1852) to v.3, no.108 (Jul 1854)).	Ponce's first newspaper. A weekly publication. Daniel Rivera, founder.
El Observador Ponceño	Ponce	1852			Felipe Conde, owner; Benito Vilardell, editor. Enciclopedia Puerto Rico calls this "Ponce's first newspaper (See, Newspapers, 19th Century. Grupo Editorial EPRL. Encyclopedia Puerto Rico. Accessed 18 August 2019.) However, Emilio Pasarell notes that, though the start of the paper was announced in La Gaceta de Puerto Rico, he doubts it was ever published due to the government's suppression of the press at the time.(See, Emilio J. Pasarell, Notas Bibliográficas Acerca de los Periódicos de Ponce. El Mundo (San Juan, Puerto Rico) Year XVII. Issue 6,153. 18 August 1935. pp. 2, 4, 12. Item 1.) Most historians agree that El Ponceño was the first paper published in Ponce.
El Fénix: periódico local, instructivo, mercantil y de avisos	Ponce	1855 (Jul 7)	1860	Photocopies and microfilm copies are available at UPRP Library (7 July 1855 to 1860).	Benito Vilardell, editor. Augusto Pasarell, editor. Juan de Dios Conde, editor.
El Eco del Comercio: semanario enciclopédico	Ponce	1861 (Jun)	1867 (c.)		Encyclopedic Weekly; Lázaro Martínez, editor.
El Faro	Ponce	1861			
El Interacto	Ponce	1865 (Oct c.) (Note: Unless it refers to a different paper by the same name, Encyclopedia Puerto Rico states this was a clandestine paper and was published from 1865 to 1866, when it changed its name to "El País" (Most likely El País: periódico político, literario, agrícola, mercantil y de avisos, as it started publishing c. 1866.), and ceased publishing in 1868 (as "El País"). (See Newspapers, 19th Century. Enciclopedia Puerto Rico. 2019.))	1866	Print copies are available at the UPR-JML Library (v.1 n.2 (Nov 1865) to v.1 n.21 (Mar 1867)).	It was a Sunday supplement to the El Propagador newspaper, during the city's theatrical season.
El Propagador: periódico político, literario, mercantil y de avisos	Ponce	1865 (Nov 4) (Note: Enciclopedia Puerto Rico states this was a clandestine paper, and was published from 1865 to 1866, when it changed its name to "El País" (Most likely El País: periódico político, literario, agrícola, mercantil y de avisos, as it started publishing in 1866), and ceased publishing in 1868 (as "El País"). (See Newspapers, 19th Century. Enciclopedia Puerto Rico. 2019.))	1866 (Apr)	Print copies are available at the UPR-JML Library (v.1 n.2 (Nov 1865) to v.1 n.21 (Mar 1867)).	Weekly. Francisco Vidal, editor; Daniel Bousquet and Fernando Velarde, collaborators. Was followed by "El Pais" (f. 8 August 1866) in August 1866.
El Moscardón	Ponce	1865 (Nov)	1865 (c.)		Clandestine newspaper.
El Estracto	Ponce	1865			
El Crepúsculo	Ponce	1866 (Mar)			Francisco Vidal, editor.
El País: periódico político, literario, agrícola, mercantil y de avisos	Ponce	1866 (Aug 8)	1868	Print copies are available at UPR-JML Library (v.1, no.8 (Sep 1866) to v.1, no.27 (Nov 1867)); and Archivo General de Puerto Rico (v.1, no.30 (Feb 1867) to v.1, no.42 (Apr 1867)).	Francisco Vidal, editor. Successor of El Propagador (f. 4 Nov 1865).
El Anunciador	Ponce	1867 (Jul)		Print copies are available at the UPR-JML Library (Jun 1867 to Jul 1867).	Free biweekly dedicated to publishing advertisements.
La Azucena	Ponce	1870 (20 Nov)	1877 (31 Aug)	Fotocopies are available at University of Puerto Rico at Ponce Adelina Coppin Alvarado Library (November 1870 to 31 January 1871, and 15 August 1874 to 31 August 1877).	Alejandro Tapia y Rivera, director Magazine. Issues from 20 November 1870 to 10 February 1871 were published in Ponce; the paper then reappeared in San Juan on 15 August 1874 and was published there until 31 August 1877. However, Fay Fowlie de Flores states the last issue published in Ponce was dated 31 January 1871.
El Pasatiempo	Ponce	1870 (Note: Emilio Pasarell states this paper started publishing in January 1872.)			Rafael Rodríguez, director.
La Hoja de Anuncios	Ponce	1870			Short-lived newspaper
El Heraldo del Trabajo: periódico semanal... (Note: p. 27 of Repertorio Colectivo de Periódicos de Puerto Rico: Lista Preliminar de Periódicos en las Instituciones Participantes lists two papers published in Ponce by this name, one subtitled "periódico semanal" and the other one subtitled "semanario agrícola, mercantil, industrial, literario, de ciencias, artes, noticias y anuncios". It's not clear if these were two different papers entirely (e.g., different companies, publishers, founding dates, business addresses, founders and directors, etc.) or the same paper that was later renamed, whether with or without a lapse/hiatus in publication.) (Note: Fay Fowlie de Flores, in her Ponce, Perla del Sur: Una Bibliografía Anotada, p. 301, writes about a paper founded in 1877, also by Mario Braschi, but titled "El Heraldo del Trabajador". That is, Fay Fowlie de Flores's paper had a name just slightly different from the one listed at Repertorio Colectivo de Periódicos de Puerto Rico: Lista Preliminar de Periódicos en las Instituciones Participantes, p. 27. As such, it is possible the correct name of this paper is El Heraldo del Trabajador.)	Ponce	1870 (Note: Fay Fowlie de Flores, in her Ponce, Perla del Sur: Una Bibliografía Anotada, p. 301, writes about a paper founded in 1877, also by Mario Braschi, but titled "El Heraldo del Trabajador". That is, Fay Fowlie de Flores's paper had a name just slightly different from the one listed at Repertorio Colectivo de Periódicos de Puerto Rico: Lista Preliminar de Periódicos en las Instituciones Participantes, p. 27. The paper listed at Repertorio, however, had volume #1 issues dated the same year (year 1877) of those published by Heraldo del Trabajo. As such, it is likely these two papers are one and the same but that either Repertorio or Fay Fowlie de Flores misspelled the name of the paper.)	1875	Print copies are available at the Archivo General de Puerto Rico (v.1, no.Unknown (Apr 1877) to v.1, no.Unknown (May 1877)).	Daily; (Note: Neumann Gandía states the paper was a daily but another source, Repertorio Colectivo de Periódicos en Puerto Rico (1986), states it was a weekly. See Repertorio Colectivo de Periódicos de Puerto Rico: Lista Preliminar de Periódicos en las Instituciones Participantes. Sistema de Bibliotecas. Universidad de Puerto Rico. Project Funded by the National Endowment for the Humanities. November 1986. p.27. Accessed 11 September 2021.) Mario Braschi, director
Don Severo Cantaclaro: semanario satírico – político y literario.	Ponce	1871 (Note: Socorro Girón, in her Ponce, El teatro La Perla y La Campana de la Almudaina, pages 154 and 182, states the paper started publishing in 1873 (specifically, 20 April 1873). Enciclopedia Puerto Rico also states an 1873 start year. Emilio Pasarell also states 20 April 1873 as its start date.)	1874 (Feb)	Print copies are available at the UPR-JML Library (v.1, no.2 (Apr 1873) to v.1, no.15 (Jul 1873)).	Weekly; Mario Braschi, editor
Don Cándido	San Juan	1872 (May) (Note: Eduardo Neumann (1913, p.151) states this paper was from Ponce but, 22 years later, Pasarell (El Mundo, 1935) does not mention it in his comprehensive list of 230 papers from Ponce. Also, 34 years later yet, in 1969, Pedreira makes it categorically clear this paper was published out of San Juan including, unlike Neumann's vague "during those times" reference, the much more concrete "May 1872" paper founding date.)			Weekly
El Derecho: periódico político, literario, comercial y de anuncios.	Ponce	1873 (Apr 22) (Note: Emilio Pasarell states it started on 20 April 1873.)	1873 (Oct 22) (Note: Apparently in a typographical error, the same historian, Socorro Girón, states in the same work, Ponce, el teatro La Perla y La Campana de la Almudaina, p. 182, that the newspaper "El Derecho" lasted until 1875.) (Note: Emilio Pasarell states it lasted until 1874.)	Print copies are available at the UPR-JML Library (v.1, no.2 (Apr 1873) to v.1, no.37 (Oct 1872 [sic, "1873"?])). (Note: Pedreira states that this paper published 37 issues, and its last issue was on 22 October 1873 (See: Antonio S. Pedreira. "El Periodismo en Puerto Rico." 1969. p.111.))	Roman Baldorioty de Castro, director
La Linterna	Ponce	1873 (Oct)	1874 (Jan)		Weekly. Jose Rosendo Cordero, director
El Diablillo Rojo: periódico democrático, satírico y de anuncios	Ponce	1873	1874	Print copies are available at the UPR-JML Library (v.2 n.3 (Jan 1874)).	Weekly Juan Geraldino Acosta, director
El Artesano: periódico republicano federal	Ponce	1874 (Jan 4)		Print copies are available at the UPR-JML Library (v1. n.2 (Jan 1874) to v.1, n.4 (Jan 1874[Sic])).	Weekly; Wistremundo Muñoz, director. (Note: Nowadays (2022), a more accurate title would be El Obrero, since what is called "obrero" (worker) today, was called "artesano" (artisan) in 1874. See Socorro Girón's Ponce, El teatro La Perla y La Campana de la Almudaina (1992), p. 156.)
El Avisador: Semanario de anuncios y de noticias mercantiles	Ponce	1874 (Apr 29) (Note: Pedreira states this paper started publishing in March 1874. See, Antonio S. Pedreira, El Periodismo en Puerto Rico, Rio Piedras, Puerto Rico: Editorial Edil, 1969, p.401.)			Published on Saturdays, free of cost. Ramón Marín, director
El Avisador: periódico literario, de intereses materiales, mercantil, y de anuncios.	Ponce	1874 (May 21)	1875	Print copies are available at the UPR-JML Library (v.1., n.1. (May 1874) to v.1, no.45 (Apr 1875)), and at Archivo General de Puerto Rico (v.1, no.14 (Aug 1874) to v.1, no.19 (Sept 1874)).	Published on Thursdays. Ramón Marín, founder; Loreto Montalvo, editor
La Semana: periódico literario, de costumbres, noticioso, mercantil y de anuncios	Ponce	1875 (Feb 7) (Note: Socorro Giron states the paper started 7 February 1873.(See, Socorro Girón. Ponce, el Teatro La Perla y La Campana de la Almudaina. p.182.))		Print copies are available at UPR-JML Library (v.1, no.1 (7 February 1875)).	Francisco Vidal, (hijo) founder; was renamed El País (Note: Pasarell states the 7 February 1875 was the paper's only issue, stating it was substituted by "El País" (f. 21 February 1875) on 21 February 1875.)
El País: periódico político, literario, mercantil y de anuncios	Ponce	1875 (Feb 21)		Print copies are available at UPR-JML Library (v.1, no.1 (Fen 1875) to v.1, no.9 (Apr 1875)).	Weekly (Fridays); Francisco Vidal, hijo, director. El País was the successor of La Semana (7 Feb 1875)
La Crónica de Ponce: periódico político, literario, de noticias e intereses materiales, comerciales y de anuncios	Ponce	1875 (May) (Note: Eduardo Neumann Gandía, in his Verdadera y Auténtica Historia de la Ciudad de Ponce, p. 154, states La Crónica was founded in 1878, and Paul G. Miller, in his Historia de Puerto Rico (New York: Rand, McNally and Co. 1922.), p. 507, states La Crónica was founded in 1894. (See Historia de Puerto Rico. Accessed 24 July 2019.)	1881 (Oct) (Note: The same historian, Socorro Girón, and in the same book appears to state La Crónica ceased publishing in 1887 (p. 189.))	Print copies are available at Archivo General de Puerto Rico (v.1, no.50 (Apr 1876) to v.5, no.112 (Apr 1980 [sic, "1890"?]).	Weekly; name was later changed to La Crónica. Roman Baldorioty de Castro and Ramón Marín, founders. Emilio Pasarell clarifies this paper succeeded "El Avisador" and had two life periods. During its first life epoch it was "periódico literario, de noticias y de intereses materiales", its founder-director was Ramón Marín and its editor was Mario Braschi. Then, during its second epoch, starting in 1880, it was a "periódico politico defensor del partido autonomista", its director was Roman Baldorioty de Castro, and editors were Jose Ramon Abad and Jose Joaquin Vargas.
La Civilización: Semanario politico, literario, de artes, noticias y anuncios	Ponce	1876 (Apr) (Note: Emilio Pasarell states it was founded in 1875.)	1893	Print copies are available at the Archivo General de Puerto Rico (v.1, n.11 (Jun 1876) to v.9, n.515 (May 1884)).	Weekly; Luis R. Velázquez, editor
La Lira	Ponce	1876			Monthly
El Heraldo del Trabajo: semanario agrícola, mercantil, industrial, literario, de ciencias, artes, noticias y anuncios (Note: p. 27 of Repertorio Colectivo de Periódicos de Puerto Rico: Lista Preliminar de Periódicos en las Instituciones Participantes lists two papers published in Ponce by this name, one subtitled "periódico semanal" and the other one subtitled "semanario agrícola, mercantil, industrial, literario, de ciencias, artes, noticias y anuncios". It's not clear if these were two different papers entirely (e.g., different companies, publishers, founding dates, business addresses, founders and directors, etc.) or the same paper that was later renamed, whether with or without a lapse/hiatus in publication.) (Note: Fay Fowlie de Flores, in her Ponce, Perla del Sur: Una Bibliografía Anotada, p. 301, writes about a paper founded in 1877, also by Mario Braschi, but titled "El Heraldo del Trabajador". That is, Fay Fowlie de Flores's paper had a name just slightly different from the one listed at Repertorio Colectivo de Periódicos de Puerto Rico: Lista Preliminar de Periódicos en las Instituciones Participantes, p. 27. As such, it is possible the correct name of this paper El Heraldo del Trabajador.)	Ponce	1877 (Note: Fay Fowlie de Flores, in her Ponce, Perla del Sur: Una Bibliografía Anotada, p. 301, writes about a paper founded in 1877, also by Mario Braschi, but titled "El Heraldo del Trabajador". That is, Fay Fowlie de Flores's paper had a name just slightly different from the one listed at Repertorio Colectivo de Periódicos de Puerto Rico: Lista Preliminar de Periódicos en las Instituciones Participantes, p. 27. The paper listed at Repertorio, however, had volume #1 issues dated the same year (year 1877) of those published by Heraldo del Trabajo. As such, it is likely these two papers are one and the same but that either Repertorio or Fay Fowlie de Flores misspelled the name of the paper.)		Print copies are available UPR-JML Library (v.2, no.15 (Aug 1878) to v.2, no.42 (Feb 1878 [sic])).	Daily; (Note: Neumann Gandía (p.154) states the paper was a daily but another source, Repertorio Colectivo de Periódicos en Puerto Rico (1986), states it was a weekly. See Repertorio Colectivo de Periódicos de Puerto Rico: Lista Preliminar de Periódicos en las Instituciones Participantes. Sistema de Bibliotecas. Universidad de Puerto Rico. Project Funded by the National Endowment for the Humanities. November 1986. p.27. Accessed 11 September 2021.) Mario Braschi, director
La Juventud Liberal: periódico politico	Ponce	1877 (c.) (Note: Emilio Pasarell states it began circulating in 1885.)	1887		Daily; Mario Braschi and Jose Ramon Adab, editors It merged into La Revista de Puerto Rico (1887–1894).
El Contemporáneo	Ponce	1878 (Note: Socorro Girón (Ponce, el teatro La Perla y La Campana de la Almudaina. Gobierno Municipal de Ponce. 1992. p. 182.) appears to state the paper began publishing in 1879. Emilio Pasarell states it was founded in September 1879; Pasarell also states this paper was re-founded a few weeks later in the paper "La Civilización.".)			Daily; Eduardo Neumann Gandía, director.
La Página	Ponce	1879 (Jan 16)			Bimonthly magazine; Eduardo Carreras, director; organ of the Gabinete de Lectura Ponceño.
El Eco de Ponce: periódico enciclopédico	Ponce	1880 (Jul) (Note: Another source, José S. Alegría in El periodismo puertorriqueño desde su aparición hasta los comienzos del siglo XX., states this paper started in 1865.)	1880 (Nov)	Print copies are available at the UPR-JML Library (Jul 1880).	Weekly, published every Monday Sotero Figueroa, director.
El Mallete	Ponce	1880			Mario Braschi, director; it was a masonic magazine.
La Revista Mercantil	Ponce	1881 (Feb)			Luis R. Velázquez, editor; Bi-weekly Conservative; Biweekly.
El Comercio	Ponce	1881 (Feb)			Juan F. Terreforte
El Eco del Comercio	Ponce	1881 (Mar)		Short-lived.	
La Avispa	Ponce	1881 (Apr) (Note: In an apparent case of a typographical error, Socorro Girón --in agreement with Antonio S. Pedreira-- states on p. 191 of her Ponce, el teatro La Perla y La Campana de la Almudaina that La Avispa started publishing in April 1881, but on her p. 182 she states it started publishing in 1879.)			Sotero Figueroa, founder.
El Diapasón	Ponce	1881 (Jul)	1881 (Jul)		Pedro Gabriel Carreras
La Cotorra	Ponce	1881 (Sep)	1881 (Dec)		"Periódico crítico literario, comercial y de noticias" (Critical literary, commercial and news newspaper).
El Pueblo: risas y burlas, sátiras punzantes, verdades amargas	Ponce	1881 (Oct 7)		Print copies are available at UPR-JML Library (v.1, no.1 (7 Oct 1881)).	
El Pueblo: periódico liberal reformista	Ponce	1881 (Oct) (Note: Pasarell states it started in 1882.)	1887 (Oct 6)	Print copies are available at UPR-JML Library (v.1, no.112 (Jul 1882) to v.4, no.532 (May 1885)).	This paper was the successor of La Crónica (1875–1881) and was itself succeeded by El Popular (1887–1889). Ramón Marín, Mario Braschi, and Jose Ramon Abad, directors
El Trabajo	Ponce	1882 (Jun 15)			Antonio M. Molina, editor-director.
El Agricultor	Ponce	1882			
La Civilización: periódico liberal	Ponce	1882 (c.)		Print copies are available at the Archivo General de Puerto Rico (v.8, n.Unknown (Jun 188?) to v.9, n.546 (Oct 1884).	Apparently a daily
El Estudio: repertorio científico, literario y satirico	Ponce	1883 (May 1)		Year 1, Issue 14 (16 Dec 1883) available at La Colección Puertorriqueña here. Also, print copies are available at Archivo General de Puerto Rico (v.1, no.14 (Nov 1883) to v.2, no. 21 (Nov. 1893)).	Biweekly; Manuel Zeno Gandía, director. Magazine.
El Bombero	Ponce	1884 (Oct 1)		Print copies are available at the UPR-JML Library (v.1 n.5 (Feb 1885)).	Virgilio Biaggi, director Organ of the Cuerpo de Bomberos de Ponce.
El Avisador Ponceño: periódico de anuncios, noticias y literatura	Ponce	1884 (Oct 8)		Print copies are available at the UPR-JML Library (v.1., n.1. (Oct 1884)).	Loreto Montalvo, director.
El Derecho Popular	Ponce	1884 (Jan))			Liberal, pro-reforms paper. Jose Ramon Abad, founder; Mario Braschi, editor-director
El Delta	Ponce	1885			Mario Braschi, director. Masonic magazine.
El Pabellón Español	Ponce	1883 (Apr) (Note: Pasarell states it started in 1885. (See, Emilio J. Pasarell. Notas Bibliográficas Acerca de los Periódicos de Ponce. El Mundo (San Juan, Puerto Rico). Year XVII. Issue 6,153. 18 August 1935. pp.2, 4, 12. Item 39.))	1886		Casiano Balbás, director. Organ of the Partido Incondicional Español political party. This paper was also called El Pabellón Nacional by some.
Revista de Puerto Rico	Ponce	1887 (Jun 15)	1894 ("end of")	Print copies are available at UPR-JML Library (v.1, no.1 (Aug 1886) to v.7, no.155 (Dec 1892)).	Daily; Francisco Cepeda, editor. Suppressed on 6 October 1887, reappeared on 2 March 1888; suspended on 23 July 1888. The paper was founded in San Juan on 18 August 1886.
El Popular: periódico político, de intereses materiales, de noticias, comercial y de anuncios.	Ponce	1887 (Oct)	1889 (Dec)	Print copies are available at Manuscript Division, Library of Congress (2a Época, Año 1, num. 70, 7 abril 1888).	Ramón Marín, Mario Braschi, and Jose Ramon Abad, directors. This paper succeeded El Pueblo (1881–1889).
El Listín Comercial	Ponce	1888	1894 (Note: Antonio Pedreida says it published until 1899. (See Antonio S. Pedreira. El Periodismo en Puerto Rico. Rio Piedras, Puerto Rico: Editorial Edil. 1969. p.481.))		Jose Llorens Echevarria, director-editor; published from Barrio La Playa.
El Obrero	Ponce	1889	1890		
La Democracia: decano de la prensa puertorriqueña	Ponce	1890 (Jul 1)	1948	Digitized issues available at Newspaper Digital Library: Digital Library of the Caribbean (La Democracia)..	Published in Ponce from 1 July 1890 to 19 September 1900, then in Caguas where it published its first issue on 23 October 1900 and published until 1902, then in San Juan where it published its first issue on 1 June 1904.; Continued by Diario de Puerto Rico 1948-
El Porvenir	Ponce	1890 (Jul)			Rafael Muñoz Grillo and Alejo Muñoz, directors.
El Diario de Ponce: periódico autonomista, politico y literario(1890) (Note: "El Diario de Ponce" is not to be confused with "El Diario de Puerto Rico", which later became "El Dia", and is currently (2022) "El Nuevo Dia".)	Ponce	1890 (Nov 1)			This paper was the successor of El Popular (1887–1889). Daily. Ramón Marín, director; (Note: Antonio S. Pedreira and Emilio Pasarell disagree as to the director of this paper: whereas Pedreira says its director was Ramon Marin, Pasarell states its directors were Luis Caballer and Luis R. Velazquez.)
El Comercio de Puerto Rico	Ponce	1890			Luis R. Velazquez, director
El Cronista	Ponce	1890			Ramón Marín, director
El Postillón	Ponce	1891 (Apr 23)	1891 (Aug)	Print copies are available at UPR-JML Library (v.Unknown, no.Unknown (4 Jul 1891)).	Daily. Francisco Gonzalo Marin, director
El Estandarte	Ponce	1891 (Jul 20)			Conservative weekly. Luis Caballer, director.
La Sombra	Ponce	1891 (Jul 22)			Luis Caballer, founder.
El País	Ponce	1891 (Sep 19)			Triweekly; Luis R. Velázquez, director.
El Amigo de tu Hogar	Ponce	1892 (Feb 1)			Farmacia Arrillaga, editors
La Revista Mercantil: defensor de los intereses generales del país	Ponce	1892 (Apr 18) (Note: Neumann Gandía states this publication started "around 1894". See Verdadera y Autentica Historia de la Ciudad de Ponce, p.156)	1897(c.)	Print copies are available at UPR-JML Library (v.3, no.237 (Feb 1895) to v.3, no.294 (Sep 1895)).	Luis R. Velázquez, editor; Bi-weekly
El Diario de Ponce(1892) (Note: "El Diario de Ponce" is not to be confused with "El Diario de Puerto Rico", which later became "El Dia", and is currently (2022) "El Nuevo Dia".)	Ponce	1892 (May 1)		Print copies are available at Archivo General de Puerto Rico (no.1 (May 1892)).	Daily, except Tuesdays; Ramón Marín, director.
El Estudio	Ponce	1892 (May 2)	1893 (December) (Note: Pedreira states the paper did noyt published any issues in June 1893. (See Antonio S. Pedreira. El Periodismo en Puerto Rico. Rio Piedras, Puerto Rico. Editorial Edil. 1969. P. 448.))		Spiritualist free-thinkers Weekly; Jose Morin Fernandez, founder.
El Noticiero: periódico politico, independiente, regionalista y de información universal. (Note: Pedreira calls it a political liberal paper. See Pedreira, p. 493.)	Ponce	1892 (May) (Note: Pedreira states it started on 4 July 1892 (See Antonio S. Pedreira. El Periodismo en Puerto Rico. Rio Piedras, PR. Editorial Edil. 1969. p. 493))	1897 (Dec 30)	Print copies are available at UPR-JML Library (v.6, no.775 (16 Jul 1897)); Archivo General de Puerto Rico (v.1, no.44 (Oct 1892) to v.3, no.397 (Jan 1895)).	This paper was the successor of El Diario de Ponce; was a tri-weekly Ramón Marín, Mario Braschi, and Jose Ramon Abad, directors
El Carnaval: Revista alegre y literaria y semanario satírico	Ponce	1892 (Aug 9)			Leonardo A. Ponce de Leon, director Suspended for financial reasons in September 1892.
La Revista Obrera	Ponce	1892 (Sept)	1895		Ramon Morel Campos, founder.
El Siboney	Ponce	1893 (Oct)	1895 (Note: Pedreira states it was still in publication in 1898 (See Antonio S. Pedreira. El Periodismo en Puerto Rico. Rio Piedras, Puerto Rico. Editorial Edil. 1969. p. 539.)		Ramon Moral Campos, founder.
La Libertad: ciencias, literatura, noticias, anuncios	Ponce	1894 (Feb 18)	1897 (Jun 28)	Print copies are available at UPR-JML Library (v.1, no.Unknown (Feb 1894) to v.2, no.12 (Sept 1895)); Archivo General de Puerto Rico (v.1, no.1 (Feb 1894) to v.Unknown, no.292 (Jan 1897)).	Felix Matos Bernier, director Triweekly. Published 18 Feb 1984 through June 1894; 16 December 1894 through April 1895; 8 August 1895 (as a daily); disappeared and lived again from 4 March 1896 through 28 June 1897.
El Eco del Sur	Ponce	1894 (Jun)	1894 (Nov 16)		Daily; Ramon Morel Campos, founder
El Independiente: Semanario dominical	Ponce	1894 (Jul)	1894 (Sep)		Agustin Navarrete, founder; the paper was suspended in Sept 1894.
El Amigo del Pueblo	Ponce	1894			Isaac Irizarry Sasport, director.
La Razón	Ponce	1895 (Jan 5)	1895 (Apr)		A paper for children; Short-lived, reappeared in Sept 1985, then again in May 1896.
El Infantil	Ponce	1895 (Jan)	1895 (Apr)		A paper for children 9 and 10 years old.
La Bomba: órgano del pueblo	Ponce	1895 (Feb 7)	1899 (c.)	Print copies are available at the UPR-JML Library (v.1., n.1. (Feb 1895) to v.1, no.15 (Apr 1895)), and at Archivo General de Puerto Rico (v.1, no.1 (Feb 1895)).	This paper was published in three "epochs": First epoch, 7 Feb to 3 May 1895; Second epoch, 22 September to 18 October 1898; (Note: During this epoch, its director was arrested by the American authorities in Puerto Rico after publishing an article titled "Bandidos o Soldados?" (Bandits or Soldiers?) and the paper was shut down by U.S. General Henry, the military governor of Puerto Rico. (See Antonio S. Pedreira. El Periodismo en Puerto Rico. Rio Piedras, Puerto Rico: Editorial Edil. 1969. p.407.)) Third epoch, 1 January 1899; triweekly.
La Ilusión	Ponce	1895 (Apr 2)			A paper for children; Guillermo Vivas Valdivieso, director. Was shut down by the city mayor.
El Cautivo	Ponce	1895 (Apr 23)	1895 (Jun 1)	Print copies are available at the UPR-JML Library (v.1 n.1 (Apr 1895) to v.1, no.18 (Jun 1895)) and Archivo General de Puerto Rico (v.1, n.2 (Apr [Sic] 1895).	Francisco E. Montañez, director. (Note: While journalist Felix Matos Bernier was jailed, this paper (which translates into English as "The Captive") was published in place of "La Libertad" (English: "Freedom).)
El Propio Esfuerzo	Ponce	1895 (May 9)			Autonomist triweekly.
El Centinela	Ponce	1895 (Sep)	1895 (Dec)		"Temporarily" suspended in December 1895; Enrique Lopez, director.
La Pequeña Antilla: trisemanario politico, de asuntos útiles al procomún, literatura, ciencias, artes y anuncios	Ponce	1895 (Nov 23)		Print copies are available at UPR-JML Library (v.1, no.19 (24 January 1896)); and Archivo General de Puerto Rico (v.2, no.186 (9 Jun 1897)).	Luis Caballer, founder. Triweekly.
La Nueva Idea	Ponce	1895 (Dec 15)			Literary Sunday paper. Felix Matos Bernier, director.
El Tiempo	Ponce	1895 (c.)			Pedro R. de Diego, director
El Heraldo Español	Ponce	1895 (c.)	1896 (c.)		Daily; Vicente Balbás y Capó, editor
El Eco del Comercio	Ponce	1896 (Jan)			
La Juventud	Ponce	1896 (May)			Children's paper; ceased publishing then reappeared in August 1896.
El Anunciador	Ponce	1896 (Oct 1)			Eugenio Deschamps, director.
La Prensa Ponceña	Ponce	1896 (Dec 16) (Note: The first and last issues have the same date (16 Dec 1896) because only one issue was released.)	1896 (Dec 16) (Note: The first and last issues have the same date (16 Dec 1896) because only one issue was released.)		Printed only 1 issue: 16 December 1896.
La Revista Mensual	Ponce	1896			
El Chisme	Ponce	1897 (Feb)	1897		Satirical biweekly.
La Patria: diario politico, órgano del Partido Republicano (Note: Neither Emilio J. Pasarell (Emilio J. Pasarell. Notas Bibliográficas Acerca de los Periódicos de Ponce. El Mundo (San Juan, Puerto Rico). Year XVII. Issue 6,153. 18 August 1935. pp.2, 4, 12. Items 78 and 95.) nor Antonio S. Pedreira (Antonio S. Pedreira. El Periodismo en Puerto Rico. Rio Piedras, Puerto Rico: Editorial Edil. 1969. p.503.) call this paper "órgano del Partido Republicano." Antonio Pedreira does say it was a "conservative newspaper", but no mention is made it was "órgano del Partido Republicano". Further, considering that Partido Republicano Puertorriqueño was not founded until 4 July 1899, two full years after this paper ceased publishing, it would be unlikely for the paper to be the organ of a party that did not yet exist. Furthermore, the only other Puerto Rican political party with the word "republicano" in its name would be Partido Republicano de Puerto Rico, which also did not exist until 1903, a full 6 years after this paper ceased publishing. As such, the "órgano del Partido Republicano" subtitle found at Repertorio Colectivo de Periódicos de Puerto Rico: Lista Preliminar de Periódicos en las Instituciones Participantes appears to be an error.)	Ponce	1897 (May)	1897 (Aug)		Adolfo Llanos Alcaraz, director; Carlos Lopez de Tord, editor; conservative newspaper
El Sastre del Campillo	Ponce	1897 (Aug 1)			Literary weekly; Humorous-satirical weekly. Luis Rodriguez Cabrero, director
El Autonomista	Ponce	1898 (Jan 5)			Jose Llorens Echevarria, director; political daily; Organ of the Union Liberal Autonomista.
El Domingo Alegre: castigat ridendo mores	Ponce	1898 (Mar)		Print copies are available at the UPR-JML Library (v.2 n.63 (April 1898)).	Weekly; was first published in Mayaguez in December 1896, lasting a short time. Then reappeared in Ponce in March 1898. Luis Emilio David, director.
La Estrella Solitaria: diario de la tarde	Ponce	1898 (Jul 29)	1899 (Sep)	Print copies are available at the UPR-JML Library (v.1, no.18 (1898) and Archivo General de Puerto Rico (v.1, no.54 (Oct 1908)).	Luis Caballer, director. Evening Daily. Independent political daily.
La Nueva Era: diario de la tarde	Ponce	1898 (Jul 30)		Print copies are available at Archivo General de Puerto Rico (v.1, no.90 (Nov 1898) to v.2, no.449 (Apr 1900)).	Jose Llorens Echevarria, director Daily, except Sundays; it was not published for a short time in January 1899 but continued publishing in February of that year; it was still published in 1900.
El Correo de Puerto Rico: periódico de intereses generales, literatura, ciencias, anuncios y de información universal	Ponce	1898 (Aug 1)	1899 (Apr)	Print copies are available at the UPR-JML Library (v.1, no.51 (Oct 1898) to v.1, no.206 (Apr 1899) and Archivo General de Puerto Rico (v.1, (Apr 1899)).	Also published in English as "The Porto Rico Mail"; Eugenio Deschamp and Eugenio Astol, founders.
La Voz del Obrero	Ponce	1898 (Aug)			Reappeared in April 1899 and, after a few weeks, it was renamed La Liga Obrera.
La Bomba	Ponce	1898 (Sep)		Print copies are available at the Universidad del Sagrado Corazon Library (v.1., n.1. (Sept 1898) to v.1, no.8 (Oct 1898)).	This paper was published in three "epochs": First, 7 Feb to 3 May 1895; Second, 22 September to 18 October 1898; (Note: during this epoch, its director was arrested by American authorities after publishing an article titled "Bandidos o Soldados?" (Bandits or Soldiers?) and the paper was shut down by U.S. General Henry, the military governor of Puerto Rico. (See Antonio S. Pedreira. El Periodismo en Puerto Rico. Rio Piedras, Puerto Rico: Editorial Edil. 1969. p.407.)) Third, 1 Jan 1899. Evaristo Izcoa Diaz, director.
El Cañón: defensor de los intereses del pueblo	Ponce	1898 (Nov 2)			José Picó Matos, director; Joaquín Tellechea, editor. The paper was suspended by mayor Luis Porrata-Doría and, on 4 January 1900, it reappeared under the direction of Luis Caballer, Evaristo Izcoa Diaz and Leonardo A. Ponce de Leon.
El Loro	Ponce	1898 (Dec 16)	1899		Humorous newspaper.
La Broma	Ponce	1898 (Dec 28)	1899		Reappeared in 1900.
El Fonógrafo	Ponce	1898 (Dec)	1899		Luis R. Velázquez, editor.
La Liga Obrera	Ponce	1898 (Dec)	1899 (Feb 15)		This paper was a re-birth of "La Voz del Obrero", which had started publishing in August 1898. Fernando J. Matias, editor.
El Obrero Liberal	Ponce (Note: While Enciclopedia Puerto Rico states this was a Ponce paper, Antonio S. Pedreira states this was a San Juan newspaper.)	1898			Supported the labor movement.
El Porvenir Social	Ponce (Note: While Enciclopedia Puerto Rico states this was a Ponce paper, Antonio S. Pedreira states this was a San Juan newspaper.)	1898			Fernando J. Matias, editor.
La Metralla	Ponce	1899 (Jan 18)	1899 (Feb)		Independent political triweekly.
Canta Claro: diario político independiente, satírico y humorístico.	Ponce	1899 (Feb 1)		Print copies are available at the UPR-JML Library (v.1 n.13 (Feb 1899)).	Independent political daily.
Porto Rico American	Ponce	1899 (Feb 4)			
El Album	Ponce	1899 (Feb 18)			
El Combate: periódico puertorriqueño para el pueblo puertorriqueño	Ponce	1899 (Feb 25)	1899 (Feb 27)	Print copies are available at the UPR-JML Library (v.1, no.37 (Jul 1899) to v.1, no.108 (Sep 1899)), at Archivo General de Puerto Rico (v.1, no.38 (Jul 1899) to v.1, no.112 (Oct 1899)) and at Universidad del Sagrado Corazon (v.1, no.2 (May 1899) to v.1, no.71 (Aug 1899)).	This paper was a re-branding of the third epoch of "La Bomba" (founded 1 January 1899). Its 4th epoch started on 22 May 1899 and was still publishing in May 1900. Evaristo Izcoa Diaz, director Apparently a daily.
Frégoli	Ponce	1899 (Mar 5)			Suspended publishing and then reappeared in December 1901.
La Patria: diario de información y eco imparcial de la opinión publica	Ponce	1899 (Mar 21) (Note: See also, Eduardo Neumann Gandía. Verdadera y Auténtica Historia de la Ciudad de Ponce. p. 161.)		Print copies are available at UPR-JML Library (v.1, no.10 (Apr 1899) to v.1, no.56 (May 1899)) and Archivo General de Puerto Rico (v.1, no.15 (Apr 1899) to v.1, no.25 (Apr 1899)).	Leonardo A. Ponce de Leon, director
Plumas: Semanario literario, de ciencias, artes y literatura	Ponce	1899 (Apr)	1899 (Aug)		Weekly; Eugenio Astol, director.
El Grito del Pueblo	Ponce	1899 (Jul)			Guillermo Atiles Garcia, director.
El Independiente	Ponce	1899 (Jul)			T. Carrion Maduro, director.
El Pueblo: Trisemanario politico y literario	Ponce	1899 (Aug 20)			Tomas Carrion Maduro, director.
El Ideal Católico	Ponce	1899 (Aug)		Print copies are available UPR-JML Library (v.1, no.1 (Aug 1899) to v.18, no.1108 (Mar 1915)).	P. Janices, director
El Caribe: Diario politico	Ponce	1899 (Sep)			Carlos del Toro, director
El Ciclón	Ponce	1899 (Sep)			Tomas Carrion Maduro, director.
La Propaganda: Diario politico independiente	Ponce	1899 (Oct)			Luis Caballer, director.
La Vanguardia: Diario politico republicano	Ponce	1899 (Oct 29)	1900		Lasted until 1900, but reappeared for a short time in 1901.
El Debate	Ponce	1899 (Dec)			

=== 20th century ===
Title	Locale	Year est.	Year ceased	Availability	Notes
El Amigo del Pueblo: periódico bisemanal	Ponce	1900 (Jan 1)			Guillermo Atiles Garcia, director.
El Derecho Popular: periódico politico	Ponce	1900 (Jan 25)	1900 (Feb 15)		Quintin Petifre Marcano, director.
La Semana Cómica	Ponce	1900 (Apr 20)			
El Eco de la Marina	Ponce	1900 (May 1)			
El Correo del Sur: diario de la mañana. Independiente, de información general, literatura y anuncios.	Ponce	1900 (May 8) (Note: In what may be a typographical error, Pasarell states this paper started publishing 9 years after Pedreira's start date, that is, on 8 May 1909. See Emilio J. Pasarell. Notas Bibliográficas Acerca de los Periódicos de Ponce. El Mundo (San Juan, Puerto Rico) Year XVII. Issue 6,153. 18 August 1935. pp.2, 4, 12. Item 151.)	1909 (Nov)	Print copies are available at Archivo General de Puerto Rico (Aug 1909).	Daily. Juan Braschi, director.
El Eco del Sur	Ponce	1900 (May c.)			
La Opinión: diario politico	Ponce	1900 (Jun 12)	1901	Print copies are available at Archivo General de Puerto Rico (v.2, no.236 (May 1901)).	Daily; Manuel Zeno Gandía, director
El Deber: diario de la tarde	Ponce	1900 (Jun 19)			Federal newspaper.
La Voz de la Marina	Ponce	1900 (Jun)			
La Campaña: Diario republicano de la tarde	Ponce	1900 (Jul 11) (Note: Pasarell states the paper started publishing on 11 July 1900, but Pedreira states it started on June 11 of that year.)			J. Ferreras, director.
El Jorobao	Ponce	1900 (Aug 4)			Juan Caliente (Evaristo Izcoa Diaz), director.
El Diario de Ponce: periódico politico, de intereses generales, información, y anuncios.(1900) (Note: "El Diario de Ponce" is not to be confused with "El Diario de Puerto Rico" (1909–1911), which later became "El Dia"(1911–1970), and is currently (2022) "El Nuevo Dia" (1970 and on).)	Ponce	1900 (Dec 1)	1903 (Jun 13)	Print copies are available at the UPR-JML Library (v.2 n.14 (May 1902)) and Archivo General de Puerto Rico (v.2, no.290 (Oct 1902)).	Daily. Edelmiro J. Lespier, founder and director. Defender of the Federal Party of Puerto Rico.
El Postillón	Ponce	1900 (c.)			Satirical tri-weekly. Enrique Santiago, director.
La Protesta	Ponce	1901 (Jan)			Political daily; Republican; I. Irizarry Sasport, director.
El Siglo XX	Ponce	1901 (Feb 1)	1902 (c.)		Weekly magazine
Listín Comercial: periódico del comercio	Ponce	1901 (Mar)	1902 (c.)		Joaquin Ferreras, director.
La Justicia	Ponce	1901 (Apr 15)	1901 (Oct)	Print copies are available at UPR-JML Library (v.1, no.49 (Aug 1901) to v.1, no.52 (Aug 1901)).	Republican triweekly; published from 15 April 1901, but disappeared in July then reappeared and was published until October 1901.
La Juventud Alegre: semanario joco-serio de literatura y anuncios	Ponce	1901 (Apr 24)			Weekly
La Información	Ponce	1901 (May 17)			Tri-Weekly
El 25 de Julio	Ponce	1901 (Jul) (Note: Pasarell states it was printed in 1902. See, Emilio J. Pasarell, Notas Bibliográficas Acerca de los Periódicos de Ponce, El Mundo (San Juan, Puerto Rico), Year XVII, Issue 6,153 18 August 1935 pp.2 4, 12 Item 118.)			Only one commemorative issue was printed in July 1901. (Note: Pasarell states it was printed in 1902. See, Emilio J. Pasarell, Notas Bibliográficas Acerca de los Periódicos de Ponce, El Mundo (San Juan, Puerto Rico), Year XVII, Issue 6,153 18 August 1935 pp.2 4, 12 Item 118.)
El Mime	Ponce	1901 (Aug 25)			Political satire weekly.
El Mosquitero	Ponce	1901 (Sep 2)			The organ of those who supported Mayor José de Guzmán Benítez, known as "Los Guzmancistas".
El Tiempo: diario independiente	Ponce	1901 (Nov 16)			Pedro R. de Diego, director.
Voz de la Patria	Mayaguez	1901	1922		
El Águila de Puerto Rico	Ponce	1902 (Jan 8)	1934 (Mar)	Print copies are available at UPR-JML Library (v.1, no.1 (Jan 1902) to v.Unknown, no.Unknown (Jun 1924)); Archivo Histórico de Ponce (8 January 1902 to 3 July 1931). Microfilm copies are available at University of Puerto Rico at Ponce Adelina Coppin Alvarado Library (8 January 1902 to 3 July 1931)).	A newspaper of the Partido Republicano Puertorriqueño political party. Manuel V. Domenech, Pedro J. Rosaly, and Ulpiano Colom, founders. Alfonso Gual, publisher and director. This paper appeared on 8 January 1902 and disappeared on 3 July 1931. It then reappeared on 1 January 1934 and lasted 2 months.
El Porvenir: diario politico de la tarde	Ponce	1902 (Feb 3)		Print copies are available at UPR-JML Library (v.1, no.50 (Apr 1902) to v.Unknown, no.Unknown (7 May 1902)).	Quintín Negrón Sanjurjo, director
Union Obrera	Ponce	1902 (Mar)	1932 (c.)		Santiago Iglesias, founder. Alejo Castro, director.
El Republicano puro: órgano del comité local de Ponce	Ponce	1902 (Aug)		Print copies are available at UPR-JML Library (v.1, no.5 (Aug 1901) to v.1, no.13 (Sep 1901)).	
La Avispa	Ponce	1902 (c.)			
El Eco de Ponce: periódico independiente	Ponce	1903 (Sep)			
La Tempestad	Ponce	1903	1905		
La República: por la union y para la union	Ponce	1904 (May 1)		Print copies are available at UPR-JML Library (v.1, no.20 (May 1904) to v.1, no.176 (Nov 1904)).	Juan Pericas Diaz, director
Crónica de Higiene y de Medicina Tropical	Ponce	1904 (May 1) (Note: Pasarell states it started in June 1904)			J. P. Raldiris, director.
El Doble Cero	Ponce	1904 (Aug) (Note: Pasarell states this paper was published in 1906. See Emilio J. Pasarell. Notas Bibliográficas Acerca de los Periódicos de Ponce. El Mundo (San Juan, Puerto Rico) Year XVII. Issue 6,153. 18 August 1935. pp.2, 4, 12. Item 145.)			Tomas Carrion Maduro, director.
Puerto Rico	Ponce	1904 (Oct 3)			Initially a Union of Puerto Rico daily, but independent later on.
El Laurel	Ponce	1904 (Dec 12) (Note: Pasarell states this publication first came out on 10 December 1904. See, Emilio J. Pasarell, Notas Bibliográficas Acerca de los Periódicos de Ponce. El Mundo (San Juan, Puerto Rico) Year XVII, issue 6,153, 18 August 1935, pp.2 4, 12, item 138.)			Literary magazine; Cesar Américo Bustamante
La Picota	Ponce	1904 (Dec)			Guillermo Atiles Garcia, director
El Abanico	Ponce	1904 (c.)			Ramon C. Colon, director.
El Testigo Evangélico	Ponce	1905 (Jan)			Weekly; Protestant. In 1910 it merged with Puerto Rico Evangélico.
El Eco de Puerto Rico: diario de la tarde	Ponce	1905 (Jun 2)	1905 (Oct)	Print copies are available at the UPR-JML Library (v.1, no.30 (Jul 1905) to v.1, no.58 (Aug 1905)).	Daily
La Lucha	Ponce	1905 (c.)			Republican political daily; Ignacio Martinez, director.
El Buen Sentido	Ponce	1906 (Jan 1)	1913		Francisco Arjona, director
El Postillón	Ponce	1906 (Jan)			Satirical tri-weekly.
La Campaña: Diario politico	Ponce	1906			Ignacio Martinez and Alfonso Gual, directors.
La Razón Libre: trisemanario politico, literatura, información y anuncios	Ponce	1907 (Jul 30) (Note: Pasarell states this paper started publishing in 1906. See Emilio J. Pasarell. Notas Bibliográficas Acerca de los Periódicos de Ponce. El Mundo (San Juan, Puerto Rico) Year XVII. Issue 6,153. 18 August 1935. pp.2, 4, 12. Item 146.)		Print copies are available at Archivo General de Puerto Rico (v.1, no.30 (Feb 1867) to v.1, no.41 (30 Jul 1907)).	Tri-weekly. Enrique Santiago, director.
La Voz del Pueblo	Ponce	1907 (Nov 4)			Unionist newspaper and successor of La Razón Libre; Fernando J. Matias, director.
El Tiempo	San Juan	1907			
The Portorrican Student	Ponce	1908 (Nov 5)			Weekly student magazine; directed and managed by students.
Porto Rico Progress	San Juan	1908			English-language
La Voz del Pueblo	Ponce	1908 (c.)			Socialist newspaper; Fernando J. Matos, director.
La Conciencia Libre: semanario librepensador	Ponce	1909 (Sep 19)	1921	Print copies are available at the UPR-JML Library (v.1, no.1 (Sept 1909) to v.12, no.671 (Jan 1921)).	Weekly. Official organ of the free-thinkers.
El Diario de Puerto Rico: periódico politico (Note: Not to be confused with "El Diario de Ponce", founded c.1900.) (Note: There was also a newspaper called "El Diario de Puerto Rico: periódico popular de la tarde" published in San Juan, starting in July 1893, another one called "Diario de Puerto Rico: de avisos y noticias" also published in San Juan starting around August 1896, and a "Diario de Puerto Rico" published out of San Juan as well, starting around December 1899.)	Ponce	1909 (Dec 13)	1911 (Apr 28)	Print copies are available at Archivo General de Puerto Rico (v.1 n.1 (Dec. 1909)), and Archivo Histórico Municipal de Ponce (entire printed collection)	Its name was changed to El Día on 28 April 1911; Guillermo V. Cintrón, founder
Puerto Rico Ilustrado	San Juan	1910	1952 (c.)		Weekly magazine
El Diario	Ponce	1910			Daily
La Prensa: Revista de ciencias morales, políticas y literarias.	Ponce	1910 (Jan 15)	1910 (Apr 16 c.)		Weekly magazine
El Buscapié	Ponce	1910 (Apr)			
Diario del Oeste	Mayaguez	1911			
Frégoli	Ponce	1911 (Jan)			Satirical weekl; Jose Mas y Perez, director.
Fiat Lux	Ponce	1911 (Feb 9)	1916		Jose A. Casals, director
El Día: decano de la prensa de Puerto Rico	Ponce	1911 (May 2)	1970	Archivo Histórico Municipal de Ponce (entire printed collection)	This paper was the successor of El Diario de Puerto Rico (1909–1911); Eugenio Astol, director; Guillermo Vivas Valdivieso become its director in 1928. In 1970, its name was changed to El Nuevo Día; Guillermo V. Cintrón, founder
El Observador	Ponce	1911 (Oct 14)		Print copies are available at UPR-JML Library (v.1, no.1 (Oct 1911) to v.Unknown, no.Unknown (23 Mar 1912)).	Weekly; published in Spanish and English (The Observer).
La Estrella de Oriente	Ponce	1911 (Nov) (Note: Pasarell says it started publishing in 1912. See, Emilio J. Pasarell. Notas Bibliográficas Acerca de los Periódicos de Ponce. El Mundo (San Juan, Puerto Rico) Year XVII. Issue 6,153. 18 August 1935. pp.2, 4, 12. Item 161.)			Theosophist magazine; Olivia Paoli de Braschi, director. (Note: Pasarell says this magazine was directed by Enrique Santiago. See, Emilio J. Pasarell. Notas Bibliográficas Acerca de los Periódicos de Ponce. El Mundo (San Juan, Puerto Rico) Year XVII. Issue 6,153. 18 August 1935. pp.2, 4, 12. Item 161.)
Juan Bobo	Ponce	1912 (Apr)			Ignacio Otero, director
El Amigo del Pueblo: diario de la mañana defensor de Puerto Rico y de la raza latinoamericana	Ponce	1912 (May 30)	1912 (Jul)	Print copies are available at the UPR-JML Library (v.1 n.1 (May 1912)).	Daily. Tomas Cerón Camargo and Luis Caballer, editors.
Puerto Rico Evangélico	Ponce	1912 (Jul 10)			Nondaily; Protestant
El Estudiante Ponceño	Ponce	1912 (Nov 1)	1913 (Jul 1)		Monthly magazine; (Note: Pasarell says this magazine was published biweekly. See, Emilio J. Pasarell. Notas Bibliográficas Acerca de los Periódicos de Ponce. El Mundo (San Juan, Puerto Rico) Year XVII. Issue 6,153. 18 August 1935. pp.2, 4, 12. Item 163.) Julio Fiol Negron, director.
El Noticiero: diario de la tarde de información general	Ponce	1912 (Dec 12) (Note: Pasarell states the paper started on 2 December 1912. See, Emilio J. Pasarell. Notas Bibliográficas Acerca de los Periódicos de Ponce. El Mundo (San Juan, Puerto Rico) Year XVII. Issue 6,153. 18 August 1935. pp.2, 4, 12. Item 160.)	1914 (Sep)	Print copies are available at Archivo General de Puerto Rico (v.1, no.1 (Dec 1912)).	Daily; Manuel Mocete Padilla, director.
La Tribuna	Ponce	1912 (c.)			
Adelante!: Semanario de Intereses Generales	Ponce	1913 (Jun 7)		Print copies are available at the Archivo General de Puerto Rico (v.1 n.1 (June 1913)).	Weekly (Note: Repertorio Colectivo calls this a semanario (weekly) (See Repertorio Colectivo, p.2), but Pedreira states it was a monthly magazine (See Pedreira, p.388).)
La Revista Cafetera	Ponce	1913 (Sep)	1918 (Jun) (Note: Pasarell states it printed 60 issues, and that the last issue was dated March 1919. See, Emilio J. Pasarell. Notas Bibliográficas Acerca de los Periódicos de Ponce. El Mundo (San Juan, Puerto Rico) Year XVII. Issue 6,153. 18 August 1935. pp.2, 4, 12. Item 169.)		Monthly; Ramon Almonte, director; it published 60 issues.
Cumbres	Ponce	1913 (Dec)			Monthly magazine; Guillermo Atiles Garcia, director.
Rasgos	Ponce	1913			Monthly magazine. Julio Fiol Negron, director.
Justicia	San Juan	1913			Published by Federación Libre de los Trabajadores de Puerto Rico
Liga de Detallistas	Ponce	1913 (c.)			
La Trinchera	Ponce	1914 (Jan)			Daily; Rafael Matos Bernier, director.
La Opinión: diario de la mañana	Ponce	1914 (Jun 19)		Print copies are available at Archivo General de Puerto Rico (v.1, no.1 (Jun 1914) to v.1, no.25 (Jul 1914)).	Unionist daily; Felix Matos Bernier, director. Daily
El Nacional	Ponce	1914 (Jun)			Carlos Q. Georgetti, director.
Vida Bohemia	Ponce	1914			Weekly; Horacio Franceschi, director.
Fraternidad	Ponce	1914			Magazine; Jose Norat Rodriguez, et al., directors.
El Eco de Ponce	Ponce	1914 (c.)			
Ponce High School Arcus	Ponce	1915 (Jan)			School magazine; Angel Fiol, director
El Ensayo	Ponce	1915 (Nov) (Note: Pasarell states it started in January 1915. See Emilio J. Pasarell. Notas Bibliográficas Acerca de los Periódicos de Ponce. El Mundo (San Juan, Puerto Rico) Year XVII. Issue 6,153. 18 August 1935. pp.2, 4, 12. Item 175.)			Manuel Tous Soto, director;Catholic magazine.
Heraldo Escolar	Ponce	1915 (Dec 15) (Note: Following the chronological timeline by Pasarell, this periodical may have started publishing in 1918, not 1915. See Emilio J. Pasarell. Notas Bibliográficas Acerca de los Periódicos de Ponce. El Mundo (San Juan, Puerto Rico) Year XVII. Issue 6,153. 18 August 1935. pp.2, 4, 12. Item 181.)			Bimonthly.
El Diluvio	San Juan	1915	1940	Print copies are available at UPR-JML Library (Unknown holdings) and UPRP (1936 to 1938).	Had a section on Ponce titled "Notas de Ponce" or "Ponce al vuelo"
Pro-Ponce: órgano de "La Liga Progresista"	Ponce	1916 (Jun) (Note: Pedreira states it was being published in 1912.)		Print copies are available at Archivo General de Puerto Rico (v.1, no.1 (Jun 1916) to v.1, no.9 (Jul 1916).	Guillermo Salazar, editor; organ of the Liga Progresista.
La Acción Social	Ponce	1916 (Nov 4)			Catholic weekly.
La Metralla	Ponce	1916			Miguel Martinez, director.
La Idea	Ponce	1916 (c.)			Weekly magazine; Bolivar Pagan, director.
La Opinión: diario independiente	Ponce	1918 (Jan 16)			Vida Moderna, editors; Tomas Carrion Maduro, director.
La Victoria: órgano de propaganda aliada	Ponce	1918 (Feb 8)		Print copies are available at UPR-JML Library (v.1, no.1 (Feb 1918) to v.1, no.26 (Feb 1919)).	Daily
La Aurora	Ponce	1918 (May)	1918 (Oct c.)		Bolivar Pagan, director.
El Alba Roja	Ponce	1918 (Aug 24)	1919 (Note: In 1919 it moved to Guayama and in 1923 it moved to Arroyo. See, Antonio S. Pedreira. El Periodismo en Puerto Rico. Rio Piedras, Puerto Rico: Editorial Edil. 1969. pp.390–391.)		Socialist weekly; Moises Echevarria, director.
El Imparcial: el diario ilustrado	San Juan	1918	1973 (Feb 28) (Note: This is the latest date of publication provided by reliable sources)	Digitized copies available at Colección Puertorriqueña. Print copies are available at UPR-JML Library (v.1, no.1 (Nov 1918) to v.1, no.20 (Mar 1979)); Archivo General de Puerto Rico (v.4, no.18 (Nov 1935) to v.Unknown, no.Unknown (Mar 1937)); Carnegie Library (v.Unknown, no.Unknown (Jan 1964) to v.Unknown, no.Unknown (Nov 1973)); Biblioteca General de Puerto Rico (v.7, no.29 (Feb 1893) to v.18, no.7,014 (Nov 1950)); Biblioteca Legislativa (v.21, no.8,087 (Jan 1954) to v.38, no. 14,110 (Oct 1972)); Universidad Católica de Puerto Rico, Biblioteca Encarnación Valdes (v.17, no.6,528 (Jul 1949) to v. 38, no. 14,368 (Oct 1973)); UPR-RUM Library (v.18, no.95 (Apr 1935) to v.38, no.14,210 (Feb 1973)); Universidad del Sagrado Corazón (v.Unknown, no.Unknown (Dic 1935) to v.Unknown, no.Unknown (Sept 1956)), Archivo Histórico Municipal de Ponce (entire printed collection)	
La Revista Moderna	Ponce (Note: Pedreida does not have a newspaper or magazine by this name published in Ponce. He does have a publications by this name, but published in Mayaguez, not Ponce, and its director was someone other than Elpidio de Mier. See, Antonio S. Pedreira. El Periodismo en Puerto Rico. Rio Piedras, Puerto Rico: Editorial Edil. 1969. p.533.)	1918			Elpidio de Mier, director.
El Clamor de Ponce	Ponce	1918	1920		Francisco R. Vizcarrondo, director.
El Mundo	San Juan	1919	1986	Digitized issues available at Newspaper Digital Library: Digital Library of the Caribbean (El Mundo). and at Colección Puertorriqueña. Print copies are available at UPR-JML Library (v.1, no.1 (Feb 1919)); Archivo General de Puerto Rico (v.3, no.717 (Jun 1921) to v.24, no.9,452 (Oct 1942)); Archivo Histórico Municipal de San German (v.1, no.3,521 (Oct 1929) to v.33, no.14, 786 (Aug 1952)); Carnegie Library (v.Unknown, no.Unknown (Jan 1919)); Biblioteca General de Puerto Rico (v.6, no.1,812 (Dec 1924) to v.45, no.16,026 (Nov 1962)); Biblioteca Legislativa (v.Unknown, no.Unknown (Jan 1960) to v.Unknown, no.Unknown (Dec 1984)); Universidad Central de Bayamón Library (v.Unknown, no.Unknown (Sept 1944)); Universidad Católica de Puerto Rico, Biblioteca Encarnación Valdes (v.55, no.73 (May 1974)); University of Puerto Rico at Cayey Library (v.Unknown, no.Unknown (Unknown month 1919)); University of Puerto Rico at Bayamón Library (v.Unknown, no.Unknown (Mar 1919) to v.Unknown, no.Unknown (Unknown month 1970)); UPR-RUM Library (v.1, no.1 (Feb 1919)); Universidad del Sagrado Corazon (v.Unknown, no.Unknown (Jan 1925)); Universidad del Turabo (v.28, no.10,455 (Jan 1946)) and Archivo Histórico Municipal de Ponce (entire printed collection)	
El Cirujano Menor	Ponce	1920 (Apr) (Note: Pasarell appears to state it was still published in 1930. See Emilio J. Pasarell. Notas Bibliográficas Acerca de los Periódicos de Ponce. El Mundo (San Juan, Puerto Rico) Year XVII. Issue 6,153. 18 August 1935. pp.2, 4, 12. Item 207.)			Guadalupe G. Perez, director; monthly organ of the Asociación de Cirujanos Menores.
Boletín de las Hijas de María	Ponce	1920 (Aug 15)	1922 (Aug 1)		Padres Paules, editors; bi-monthly.
El Combate: diario Independentista	Ponce	1920 (Sep)			Julio del Toro Fernandez, director; daily; supported the philosophy of the Puerto Rico independence movement.
La Retranca	Ponce	1920 (c.)			Carlos Q. Georgetti.
Alma	Ponce	1922 (Feb 15)	1924 (c.)		Isabel Motta de Ramery, director; bi-monthly.
El Boletín Parroquial	Ponce	1922 (Aug 15)	1926 (Jul)		Padre Florencio Garcia Paul, director. Catholic weekly.
El Obrero de Ponce	Ponce	1923 (Apr 15)	1924 (May 4)		Socialist Party weekly; Sandalio E. Alonso, director.
El Dependiente	Ponce	1923 (Aug)			P. V. Martinez, director; official organ of the Asociación de Empleados de Comercio. Weekly.
El Nacionalista de Ponce	Ponce	1923 (c.)	1928		Official organ of the Partido Nacionalista de Puerto Rico in Ponce. Weekly; Ramon Mayoral Barnes, director-editor.
El Hípico de Ponce	Ponce	1924 (c.)			Carlos Caballero, director; weekly.
La Tribuna: diario socialista	Ponce	1925 (Aug 13)	1969 (c.) (Note: Pedreira states it was still being published at the time of the release of his book (year 1969). See Antonio S. Pedreira. El Periodismo en Puerto Rico. Rio Piedras, Puerto Rico: Editorial Edil. 1969. p.545.)	Print copies are available at Archivo General de Puerto Rico (v.1, no.17 (Sep 1925) to v.4, no.727 (Mar 1929)).	Daily. Moises Echevarria, director.
El Liberal: semanario politico-aliancista	Ponce	1926 (Dec 17)			Manuel Mayoral Barnes, director. E. Ramos Antonini and Joaquin Tellechea, editors.
Hoja Parroquial de Ponce	Ponce	1926 (c.)	1928		Padres Paules, directors.
Luminarias	Ponce	1926 (c.)			Jose Norat Rodriguez, director; a monthly magazine.
Las Escuelas de Ponce: periódico defensor de la instrucción publica, democrática y gratuita para niños (Note: It appears this paper also went by the name Ponce Escolar. See, Emilio Pasarell, item 197.)	Ponce	1927 (c.)		Print copies are available at the UPR-JML Library (v.1, no.10 (24 Jun 1927).	Eugenio Lecompte, director.
Ariel	Ponce	1928 (c.)			Domingo Candelario, director; monthly magazine of the Ponce High School.
El Intransigente	Ponce	1929 (Jan)	1935 (c.)		Eduardo Ramu, directors; independent nationalist weekly.
Revista Comercial de Puerto Rico	Ponce	1929 (Mar 1)			Jesus Maria Benitez y Manuel Mayoral Barnes, directors; bimonthly.
Rayo de Luz	Ponce	1929 (c.)	1930 (c.)		Mariano Gautier, founder; Juan I. Saliva, director; bimonthly spiritualist weekly.
El Nacionalista de Puerto Rico	Ponce	1930 (Aug 1)			Pedro Albizu Campos and A. Gonzalez Orona, directors.
Heraldo Latino	Ponce	1930			Jose Obdulio Colon, director; monthly magazine presenting communist doctrines; became a weekly under the directorship of A. M. Saavedra.
La Voz del Pueblo	Ponce	1930			Salomon Rosario, director.
Nuevo Ambiente	Ponce	1930 (c.)			Bienvenido G. Camacho, director; weekly.
La Barra	Ponce	1930 (c.)			R. Castillo Lozano, director; Luis Fortuño Janeiro, administrador; political weekly.
El Brujo	Ponce	1930 (c.)			R. Martinez Campos, director; brief satirical weekly.
El Combate	Ponce	1931 (Jan 24)			Luis Justiniano, director; weekly; supported the philosophy of the Partido Republicano Puro political party.
La Fricción	Ponce	1931 (Aug 6)			R. Martinez Campos, director; weekly.
Patria	Ponce	1931 (Sep 1)			Jose Elias Levi, director; literary weekly; "barely circulated".
Habana News	Ponce	1931 (Oct)			Published by Teatro Habana; M. Gonzalez, director.
El Liberal: semanario politico ilustrado	Ponce	1932 (Sept)			Joaquin del Llano, director; illustrated political weekly.
La Chispa	Ponce	1932 (Oct 9)			Carlos Q. Georgetti, director; political daily.
La Gaceta	Ponce	1933 (Feb 4)		Print copies are available at Archivo Histórico Municipal de Ponce (entire printed collection)	Ernesto Santana, director; impartial weekly.
El Derecho	Ponce	1933 (Apr)			Guardia de Honor de la Union Republicana, editors; published with irregular frequency.
Ecos del Sur	Ponce	1933 (Jun)			Eusebio Rodriguez Martinez, director; was a political weekly until 2 January 1934 when it became a daily.
La Gaceta Comunista	Ponce	1933 (Aug)			Miguel Bahamonde, director.
Modern Business College Review	Ponce	1933 (Dec 18)			Ligia Pietri Salas, director; bimonthly.
Movietonets	Ponce	1934 (Jan)			M. Gonzalez de Lamair, director. A cinematographic paper.
La Opinión: periódico politico informativo	Ponce	1934 (Apr 14)			Antonio Mirabal, director; weekly.
El Mensajero Dominical	Ponce	1934 (Apr)			A publication of the Iglesia de la Santísima Trinidad; a weekly but published irregularly.
El Detallista	Ponce	1934 (May 7)			Defender of the retailers; Eusebio Rodriguez Martinez, director; weekly.
La Bandera Liberal	Ponce	1934 (Jun 9)			Supported the philosophy of the Liberal Party of Puerto Rico political party; weekly; Eloy Rentas Torres, director.
Cine Parlante	Ponce	1934 (Aug 9)			Cinematic bimonthly.
Puerto Rico Comercial	Ponce	1934 (Oct 1)			Jose de la Cruz, director; bimonthly.
Mi Compañero	Ponce	1934 (Nov 10)			School weekly; Lorenza Brunet, director.
Rojo y Negro	Ponce	1934 (c.)			Organ of the Asociación de Cronistas Deportivos Escolares; Luis E. Ramos, director.
La Defensa del pueblo: periódico afirmacionista – defensor de los intereses del pueblo	Ponce	1935 (Dec)		Print copies are available at Archivo General de Puerto Rico (v.1, no.1 (Dic 1935) to v.1, no.2 (Jan 1936)).	
La Simiente: semanario nacionalista de información general	Ponce	1935 (c.)		Print copies are available at UPR-JML Library (v.1, no.24 (30 September 1935)).	Weekly. Defender of Puerto Rico's independence.
La Revista Gráfica del Sur	Ponce	1939	1945		Weekly; José A. Lanauze Rolón and Joaquín Gil de La Madrid Padilla, founders.
Puerto Rico World Journal	San Juan	1940			
Germinal: periódico de ideas, doctrinas y combate	Ponce	1941 (c.)		Print copies are available UPR-JML Library (v.1, no.4 (Jun 1941) to v.2, no.24 (Apr 1942)).	
Prensa libre: semanario de combate e intercambio intelectual panamericano	Ponce	1944 (Sep)		Print copies are available at UPR-JML Library (v.1, no.1 (Sep 1944) to v.1, no.13 (Dec 1944)).	Weekly
El Universal	San Juan	1947 (c.)	1948	Digitized copies available at Colección Puertorriqueña.	
San Juan Star	San Juan	1959	2008	Printed copies are available at Archivo Histórico Municipal de Ponce (entire printed collection)	Daily (island-wide). Published 5 days a week; English-language.
Entre Nosotros: órgano intergrupal de los cursos del Profesor Carlos Mendez Santos	Ponce	1969 (c.)		Print copies are available at the UPR-JML Library (v.3, no.6 (Nov. 1972) to v.9, no.16 (Apr-May 1980)).	
SUR: boletín del Ateneo de Ponce	Ponce	1972 (c.)			
La Opinión de Ponce: analiza la vida puertorriqueña	Ponce	1973 (c.)		Print copies are available at UPR-JML Library (v.2, no.48 (Sep 1974) to v.3, no.72 (Mar 1975)).	Ramon Quiñones. Apparently issued twice per month.
El Regional del Sur: al servicio de la comunidad	Ponce	1973 (c.)		Print copies are available at UPR-JML Library (v.1, no.6 (May 1973) to v.1, no.7 (May 1973)).	
El País: primer periódico social, cívico, cultural y deportivo de Puerto Rico	Ponce	1974 (c.)		Print copies are available at UPR-JML Library (v.Unknown, no.Unknown (Feb 1975) to v.2, no.6 (May 1975)); and Universidad Católica de Puerto Rico, Biblioteca Encarnación Valdes (v.Unknown, no.Unknown (Feb 1975) to v.2, no.6 (May 1975)).	
El Tiempo: el periódico de Ponce	Ponce	1977 (May 1)		Print copies are available at UPR-JML Library (v.1, no.Unknown (1 May 1977)); and Universidad Católica de Puerto Rico, Biblioteca Encarnación Valdes (v.1, no.1 (May 1977) to v.1, no.2 (May 1977)).	
La Estrella del Sur	San Juan	1978 (Oct)	1980 (Aug)	Print copies are available at Pontificia Universidad Católica de Puerto Rico Library (Unknown holdings).	
Ponce al Dia	Ponce	1979 (Nov 7)		Print copies are available at Pontificia Universidad Católica de Puerto Rico Library (7 nov 1979-on).	
El Reportero: diario independiente de la tarde	San Juan	1980	1987	Digitized copies available at Coleccion Puertorriqueña. Printed copies are available at Archivo Histórico Municipal de Ponce (entire printed collection)	
La Estrella Norte	Arecibo	1983 (c.)	2015		
La Estrella Oeste	Mayagüez	1983 (c.)	2015		
ACR Informa	Ponce	1984 (Sep c.)		Print copies are available at the UCPR, Biblioteca Encarnación Valdez (v.1 n.2 (Sept 1984)).	PUCPR, Biblioteca Encarnacion Valdes?
La Fuente: la fuente informativa del area del sur	Ponce	1985 (c.)		Print copies are available UPR-JML Library (v.2, no.7 (Jan-Feb 1986) to v. 2, no. 8 (Mar 1986)), Carnegie Library (v.1, no. 2 (Mar 1899) to v.1, no.5 (Nov 1885)) to ?; Biblioteca General de Puerto Rico (v.2, no.7 (Ene-Feb 1986), Universidad Católica de Puerto Rico, Biblioteca Encarnación Valdes (v.1, no.1 (May 1885) to 8 May 1986)).	Weekly
La Raza	Ponce	1986 (Apr)		Print copies are available at Universidad Católica de Puerto Rico, Biblioteca Encarnación Valdes (v.1, no.1 (Apr 1986) to v.1, no.4 (Apr 1986)).	
El Sureño: periódico del sur	Ponce	1986 (c.)		Print copies are available at Universidad Católica de Puerto Rico, Biblioteca Encarnación Valdes (v.2, no.1 (May 1986)) and 1–15 April 1986.	
La Epoca	Ponce	1986 (Apr 6)		Print copies are available at the UPR-JML Library (v.1, no.1 (6 April 1986).	
El Ponce Star	San Juan	1998 (2 Feb) (Note: Most likely date based on being a daily and having its 16 October 1998 issue being labeled "Vol 1 # 256".)	2008 (29 Aug) (Note: The most likely date since this paper was the Ponce edition of The San Juan Star and the San Juan Star published its last issue on 29 August 2008)	Print copies are available at Archivo Histórico Municipal de Ponce (entire printed collection)	Daily. This paper was the Ponce edition of The San Juan Star which had island-wide circulation.

=== 21st century ===
Title	Locale	Year est.	Year ceased	Availability	Notes
Puerto Rico Daily Sun	San Juan	2008			
El Sur a la Vista	Ponce	2009 (Oct)	2012 (Jan c.)		Regional Online.

=== Diaspora/Exile newspapers ===
These are defunct papers not published in Puerto Rico for political reasons.

Title	Locale	Year est.	Year ceased	Notes
Boletín de la Revolución	New York	c. 1869	c. 1869	Digitized copies available at Coleccion Puertorriqueña

== See also ==
- Media of Puerto Rico
- List of Spanish-language newspapers published in the United States
- Journalism in Puerto Rico
- Puerto Rican literature

== Bibliography ==
=== in English ===
- "List of Newspapers and Periodicals Published in Porto Rico", Register of Porto Rico for 1910, San Juan: Bureau of Supplies, Printing, and Transportation, 1911, p. 286, hdl:2027/nyp.33433057101119
- Michael Wright (15 November 1982), "5 Daily Newspapers Vier for Puerto Rico's Readers", New York Times
- Mireya Navarro (19 September 1997), "Puerto Rico Newspaper War Puts Editors at Odds", New York Times

=== in Spanish ===
- "Puerto Rico: San Juan: Periódicos". Anuario del comercio, de la industria, de la magistratura y de la administración de España, sus colonias, Cuba, Puerto-Rico y Filipinas, estados hispano-americanos y Portugal (in Spanish). Vol. 4. Madrid: Bailly-Bailliere e Hijos. 1908.
- Antonio S. Pedreira (1941). El periodismo en Puerto Rico: bosquejo histórico desde su iniciación hasta el 1930. Monografías de la Universidad de Puerto Rico (in Spanish). OCLC 1469629.
- El periodismo puertorriqueño desde su aparición hasta los comienzos del siglo XX. José S. Alegría. Instituto de Cultura Puertorriqueña. San Juan, Puerto Rico. 1960.
- Miguel B. Márquez (2000). "Sobre los comienzos del periodismo en Puerto Rico" [On the beginnings of journalism in Puerto Rico]. Revista Latina de Comunicación Social (in Spanish). 33. Spain: University of La Laguna. ISSN 1138-5820.
