= La Democracia (newspaper) =

Newspaper founded in 1890 in Ponce, Puerto Rico

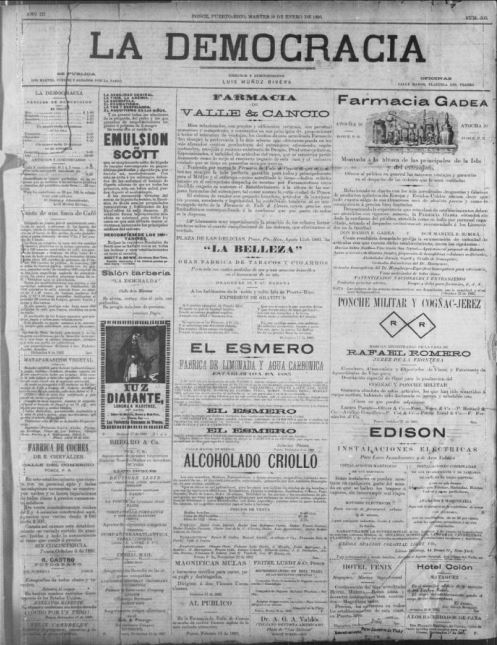
- 10 January 1893 issue of La Democracia
- Type: Daily newspaper
- Format: Tabloid
- Owner: Luis Munoz Rivera
- Founder: Luis Muñoz Rivera
- Editor: Americo Marin; Luis Muñoz Marín
- Founded: 1 July 1890
- Political alignment: Liberal
- Language: Spanish
- Ceased publication: 1948
- Headquarters: Imprenta "El Vapor"; Calle Cristina; Ponce, Puerto Rico

La Democracia, founded on 1 July 1890, was a newspaper published by Luis Muñoz Rivera in Ponce, Puerto Rico. It crusaded for Puerto Rican self-government. At a publication length of 58 years, it was the longest continuously-running Puerto Rican Spanish newspaper of its time, and one of the longest continuously running Puerto Rican newspapers of all time.

== History ==
La Democracia was for many years the official organ of the Liberal Party. It began in Ponce in 1890, as a newspaper with three issues per week, but in May, 1893, it became a daily. After ten years in Ponce, in 1900 it moved to Caguas. In 1904, it moved again, to San Juan. Originally not a daily, it became a daily when Muñoz Rivera imported a Marinori press from the United States. The Marinori press could produce 25,000 copies of a newspaper in one hour.

== Coverage ==
The publication was mostly directed towards politics, but it also included poetry and stories published by Puerto Rican artists. The newspaper brought immediate controversy, which eventually led to Muñoz Rivera's arrest. Protests were organized throughout Puerto Rico and he was released after his father paid 15,000 pesetas as bond. Muñoz Rivera sold his half of the store, in order to raise funds for the publication's establishment.

Among the better known writers and contributors in La Democracia were Carlos del Toro Fernández, Gumersindo Rivas, Mariano Abril, Luis Rodríguez Cabrero, and José A. Negrón Sanjurjo, Rafael Matos Bernier, Antonio R. Barceló, José Coll y Vidal, Alfredo Vargas, José Dávila Ricci, Luis Muñoz Marín, Sebastián Dalmau Canet, Samuel R. Quiñones.

== Legacy ==
La Democracia "laid the groundwork for Ponce's journalistic tradition." The building structure where La Democracia was edited and printed still stands in Ponce, on Calle Cristina across from Hotel Melia; a plaque on the side of the building states "site of Imprenta 'El Vapor' of Luis Muñoz Rivera".

== Other Ponce-based papers ==
- El Ponceño (1852)
- El Fénix (1855)
- El Derecho (1873) By Roman Baldorioty de Castro.
- La Crónica (1894) By Ramón Marín.
- El Postillón (1894) By Francisco Gonzalo Marín.
- El Día (1909)
- La Revista de Puerto Rico (ca. 1916)
- La Perla del Sur (1982) By Juan J. Nogueras.

== See also ==
- List of newspapers in Puerto Rico
