= El Ponceño =

Puerto Rican newspaper

- Periódico literario, local, mercantil y de avisos
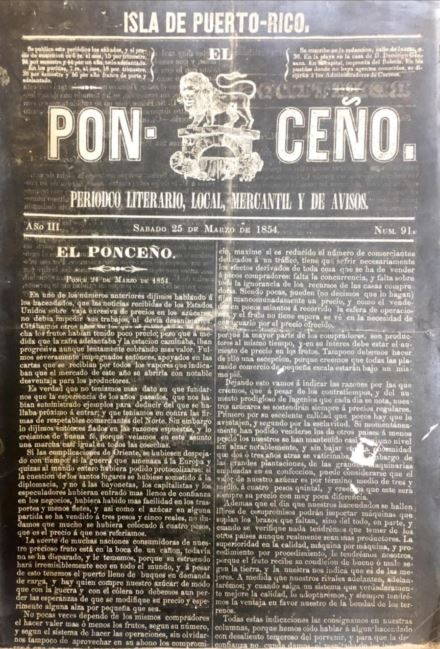
- The 25 March 1854 issue of "El Ponceño"
- Type: Weekly newspaper
- Format: Tabloid
- Owner(s): Felipe Conde,
- Founder: Felipe Conde
- Editor: Felipe Conde, Benito Vilardell, and Augusto Pasarell-Mills
- Founded: 10 July 1852 (Note: Mariano Vidal Armstrong (Estampas, Tradiciones y Leyendas de Ponce. Instituto de Cultura Puertorriqueña. 1986. p. 99.) states the paper was founded on 1 July 1852.)
- Ceased publication: 22 June 1854
- Political alignment: Liberal
- Language: Spanish
- Headquarters: Calle Cristina; Ponce, Puerto Rico

El Ponceño, founded in 1852, was the first newspaper published in Ponce, Puerto Rico. The paper was originally named "El Observador Ponceño" but it was shortened to "El Ponceño".

== History ==
El Ponceño was founded by Daniel Rivera. Daniel received help for the establishment of the newspaper from the modern philosopher, author and politician Dr. Don Andrés López de Medrano. El Ponceño came to the light of day at a time of political repression of the press in Puerto Rico. Yet, "despite a late start in Puerto Rico, the press played a significant role in the literature and the cultural life of Puerto Rico. The Royal Decree of 1834 censured the printing of texts and this was also applied to the press. In 1836 there was a restoration of the freedom of the press for Spanish papers but not for papers published in the Spanish colonies. Despite this, in 1839 the Boletín Instructivo y Mercantil de Puerto Rico was established in San Juan. In 1848 El Imparcial was founded in Mayaguez; it lasted 50 days before being vanished by Governor Juan Prim. Likewise El Ponceño was also shut down, but "in its short life it managed to become part of the cultural life and the sustainment of economic development" of the area. The paper was founded in 1852 in the city of Ponce as "El Observador Ponceño" It was a weekly paper, published on Saturdays. Its offices were located on Calle Cristina, in the same structure that Luis Muñoz Rivera later published "La Democracia."

== Coverage ==
The paper covered issues related to municipal (improvements, roads, bridges) and island affairs as well as political matters. Poetry was one method used in the paper to publish popular thought. Satire was another. One of the better known writers in this paper was Ramon Marin. Ramon Marin later became a well-known Ponce historian and one of his grandchildren became governor of Puerto Rico. According to Villagómez, one reason the paper evaded official censure was because it contained mostly articles that "were not a threat to the colonial political system but a criticism to the pro-slavery society in Ponce.

== Closure ==
Enjoying two years of continuous weekly publishing, El Ponceño was shut down by the Spanish government in July 1854. The orders came from the Spanish governor in the Island, Fernando de Norzagaray, for offending the conservative views of his administration. Tensions had been building for some time, but the 22 July 1854 publishing of a poem by Daniel Rivera title "Agüeybaná El Bravo" proved too much for the conservative Spanish government to bear. The poem praised the 1511 Taino Indian revolt against the Spanish invaders. Daniel Rivera was sent into exile by Norzagaray.

Daniel Rivera's poem read, in part, as follows:

"¡Ea, compañeros! Vamos al combate: Honor la patria a defender nos llama; Si en paz, contento el corazón no late La guerra nos dará fortuna y fama; Hasta la mar que nuestra costa bate Ondas escupe y agitada brama, Que cual nosotros contemplar quisiera Libre esta perla de la gente ibera."	"Hey brothers! Let's go to the fight: The motherland calls us to defend our honor; If our hearts do not beat peacefully War will grant us fortune and fame; Even the sea that beats our shores Spits waves and rumbles with alarm, For like us it, too, would like to see Our pearl freed from the Iberian people."

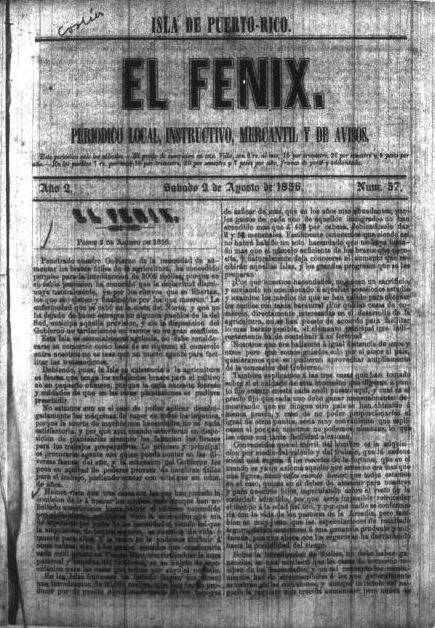
The 2 August 1856 issue of "El Fénix", the paper that the El Ponceño owners opened after their paper was shut down

After the closing of El Ponceño, Vilardell founded El Fénix, and performed as both reporter and editor. He also went into the insurance business.

== Other Ponce-based papers ==
- El Fénix (1855)
- La Democracia (1890-1948) Imprenta El Vapor. Founded by Luis Muñoz Rivera.
- El Día (1909)
- La Perla del Sur (1982) By Juan J. Nogueras.
- La Revista de Puerto Rico
- El Derecho (1873) By Roman Baldorioty de Castro.
- La Crónica (1894) By Ramón Marín.
- El Postillón (1890) By Francisco Gonzalo Marín.

== See also ==
- List of newspapers in Puerto Rico
