= News Is My Business =

Online newspaper about Puerto Rico

News Is My Business is an online newspaper covering business topics related to Puerto Rico. The newspaper was founded by Michelle Kantrow, a recipient of an Overseas Press Club award. (Note: Trend Offset Printing. "...Kantrow, who won three major awards in 2008 for her business reporting, including the Overseas Press Club of Puerto Rico’s Teodoro Moscoso Award for Excellence in Business Journalism...") (Note: Overseas Press Club (2010) "Los ganadores del Premio Especial Teodoro Moscoso al Periodismo de Negocios y Finanzas han sido: 2007-2008 Michelle Kantrow, The San Juan Star") The newspaper is listed by the Puerto Rico Government Development Bank as an "english language source of news on Puerto Rico" and is often cited as a news source by several organizations including the Puerto Rico Products Association, Connect Puerto Rico, Voxxi, Metro International, El Nuevo Día, and the Puerto Rico Center for the New Economy.
