= Jessi Smiles =

American influencer and YouTuber (born 1993)

- Born: Jessica Vazquez; August 18, 1993 (age 33)
- Education: Miami Dade College (dropped out)
- Occupations: YouTuber; influencer; podcaster; singer
- Spouse: Nassim Ssimou (m. 2017)
- Children: 2

YouTube information
- Channel: JessiSmiles
- Years active: 2013–present
- Subscribers: 960 thousand
- Views: 108.5 million
- Last updated: March 8, 2026

Jessica Vasquez (born August 18, 1993), known professionally as Jessi Smiles, is an American YouTuber, podcaster, and influencer. She rose to prominence on Vine starting in 2013 and has been described as one of the platform's earliest stars. As of 2026, she co-hosts the podcast Do We Know Them?

== Early life ==
Vasquez was born on August 18, 1993. She is of Cuban descent. She has one brother, a pianist named Joel "Joey" Vazquez. Her mother, Cristina Ferrero, worked as her manager in 2014; her parents divorced when she was young. As a child, she won various singing competitions throughout Miami. Eight months before her scheduled graduation, she dropped out of high school and was subsequently homeschooled. She later attended Miami Dade College, but dropped out after one semester. She auditioned for the televised music competition series The X Factor and The Voice, but did not advance past auditions.

== Career ==
In mid-2013, while working as both a receptionist at a laser hair removal spa and as a makeup artist in Miami, Smiles began posting recreations of popular videos on the service Vine. She became known for her relatable comedy skits about subjects such as popular culture, relationship struggles, liking food, her resemblance to Jennifer Lawrence, and "failing at being sexy". In her first Vine to appear on the platform's popular page, "The Shit Guys Care About", she twerked in short-shorts; she soon reached 100 thousand followers and quit her spa job. In August 2013, four weeks after starting her account, she accrued one million followers and was verified on Vine, also appearing in a video with Pharrell Williams.

In 2014, she had more than 3.4 million followers on Vine, was its second most-followed user, and frequently made collaborative videos with user Gabbie Hanna. Business Insider included Smiles on their 2014 list of the biggest Vine stars in the world. Also that year, she launched a YouTube channel for her music, Jessi Sings, and released her debut single, "What If I". She starred in a television advertisement for the HP Pavilion x360 laptop alongside Viners Zach King, Brodie Smith, and Robby Ayala, which premiered in August 2014. She posted her last video on Vine, which promoted her YouTube channel, in March 2016 before it was discontinued in January 2017.

By 2024, she had begun co-hosting the social media–focused podcast Do We Know Them? with Lily Marston. In June of 2025, Jessi Smiles also launched a second podcast with friend Kathleen Lights called The JK Podcast.

== Public image and accolades ==
Voxxi included her on their list of the best Latino creators on Vine in 2013, with Jessica Lucia Roiz writing that she was "without a doubt one of the funniest 'chicas'" on the platform. Also that year, Gabriel Morales of ABC News called her "Vine's superstar princess" who was known for her "sense of humor and charm". For Rolling Stone, David Kushner called Smiles one of "Vine's first superstars" in 2014 and attributed her popularity online to "some cocktail of charm, humor and sex appeal".

At the Shorty Awards, she was nominated for Vine Star of the Year in 2015 and for YouTube Comedian in 2017.

== Personal life ==
Smiles married Nassim Ssimou in April 2017. She gave birth to a son, Noah, in August of that year.

=== Curtis Lepore relationship and assault allegations ===
Smiles began dating fellow Viner Curtis Lepore in 2013. Their first in-person meeting was on August 4th, in New York City's Washington Square Park, organized by managers at the social media agency Collab, shared by fans with the hashtags "#jessimeetscurtis" and "#curtisandjessimeet", and attended by around 2,000 people, including a live band and Nev Schulman, the host of the MTV series Catfish.

David Kushner, in an article for Rolling Stone, wrote that Smiles and Lepore's relationship "became the biggest story Vine had ever seen" and "the first love story to unfold like this online"; New York Magazine's Camille Dodero described them as "Vine's first celebrity couple"; and Samantha Grasso of The Daily Dot called them "[Vine's] first star couple".

Two weeks after their first in-person meeting, Smiles flew out to LA to visit him, but the two broke up four days later; Smiles still stayed in LA for the planned duration of the trip. On August 31, Smiles hit her head while filming a Vine, likely resulting in a concussion; Lepore, insisting someone needed to watch over her, drove Smiles to his home and, she alleged, raped her in her sleep. He was arrested in September 2013 in North Hollywood on rape charges, which were publicized in a TMZ article in January 2014. The allegations quickly went viral on social media and prompted death threats against Smiles. That February, he agreed to a plea deal and pleaded no contest to a lesser charge of felony assault.

In November 2019, Smiles uploaded a video alleging that Gabbie Hanna, her former best friend, defended and collaborated with Lepore following his plea deal. In 2014, prior to having met either Smiles or Lepore, on the day TMZ had broken the news about the rape charges, Hanna had posted multiple tweets expressing skepticism about Smiles's accusations. Social media users soon criticized Hanna as a rape apologist. In June 2021, in response to what Smiles described as Hanna continuously mischaracterizing her own interactions with Lepore as having been fewer than there actually were, Smiles uploaded several videos of a 2020 phone call between her and Hanna. In Smiles's hour-and-20-minute long video "Gabbie Hanna will never stop", uploaded to YouTube in July 2021, she asked Hanna to stop mentioning her rape trial. Gizmodo included Hanna's subsequent response video to Smiles on their list of the worst YouTube apology videos of all time in 2023.

== Discography ==
List of singles, showing year released and album title
Title	Year	Album
"What If I"	2014	Non-album singles
"Bitch, Please!"	2014	Non-album singles
"Learn to Love" (with Joel Vazquez)	2019	Non-album singles
"Perfect Timing" (with Benjamin Card)	2025	Non-album singles
