= Eduardo Neumann Gandía =

Puerto Rican historian (1852–1913)

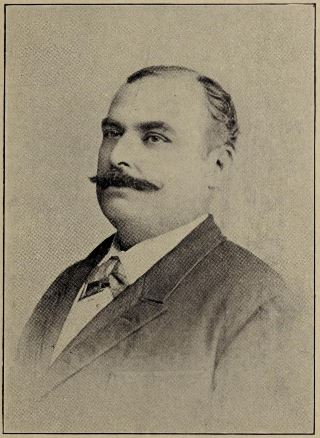
- Eduardo Neumann Gandia, c. 1910
- Born: 26 April 1852; Ponce, Puerto Rico
- Died: 9 September 1913 (aged 61); Cherbourg, France
- Occupations: Educator, Historian
- Spouse: Josefa Labarthe Tirado
- Children: Josefa, Zaida
- Relatives: Guillermo Neumann (father); Josefa Gandia (mother); Manuel Zeno Gandia (cousin)

Eduardo Neumann Gandía (26 April 1852 – 9 September 1913), was one of Puerto Rico's most accomplished historians. He is particularly well known for his nineteenth century book Verdadera y Auténtica Historia de la Ciudad de Ponce: desde sus primitivos tiempos hasta la época contemporánea. (Note: Eduardo Neumann Gandia. Verdadera y Autentica Historia de la Ciudad de Ponce. San Juan, Puerto Rico: Imprenta Burrillo. 1913. (See, Francisco Antonio Scarano, "Sugar and slavery in Puerto Rico: the municipality of Ponce, 1815-1849", Section "Bibliography: Other Printed Sources", page 466. Ph. D. Thesis. Columbia University. 1978.) Reprinted in San Juan, Puerto Rico, by Instituto de Cultura Puertorriqueña in 1987. See also, Mariano Vidal Armstrong, "Eduardo Newmann Gandia, Genealogia Vida y Obra." Ponce, Puerto Rico. 1960. p. 7. printed at Imprenta de Aldecoa. Burgos, Spain.) His father was Guillermo Neumann, who was mayor of Ponce from 23 April 1851 to 30 September 1851. Eduardo Neumann Gandía's most important work was Benefactores y Hombres Notables de Puerto Rico. (Vol. I, 1896; Vol. II, 1899). Neumann wrote profusely during a period of 30 years, producing some 20 major works plus numerous articles in newspapers and periodicals.

== Biography ==
Neumann Gandia was born in Ponce. His father was Guillermo Neumann, mayor of Ponce in 1851. His mother was Josefa Gandia, a devout Catholic in the city of Ponce. Manuel Zeno Gandia was his cousin.

Neumann Gandia was known for his autonomic leanings. Reflecting, in 1913, upon the liberties Spain had given Puerto Rico almost 200 years before the U.S. invasion of the Island, he pointed out that Spain had allowed native-born Puerto Rican Ramon Power to serve as a member of Spain's "Junta Suprema del Gobierno Nacional" (equivalent to a member of the national cabinet in modern western governments) as well as vice-president at the Cortes of Cádiz (roughly equivalent to vice'president of the national congress in modern times). Analyzing the freedoms granted by Spain to Puerto Rico he wrote,

"Noble and fair Spanish Republic, which gave Puerto Rico it then [year 1812] all the advancements and freedoms that it proclaimed for itself without prejudices or reservations, freedoms that after one hundred years the American Government refuses to grant us. If Spain did not give more, it was because it couldn't, influenced as it was by "awkward gangs" that lurked around and which imposed themselves upon the Captaincy General to the point of having the audacity of having them deposed of their power, as it happened with Don Simón de la Torre."

== Career ==
Neumann Gandía distinguished himself as an essayist and teacher, as well as an accomplished historian and prolific writer. The best known of his books is his 1913 Verdadera y Auténtica Historia de la Ciudad de Ponce, desde sus primitivos tiempos hasta la época contemporánea ("True and Authentic History of the City of Ponce, from its primitive times to the contemporary age"), a comprehensive and detailed history of the City of Ponce covering over 250 years, from 1646 to 1911. Neumman was also a prolific art collector. He had particularly keen interest in Taino and Antillean pottery in Puerto Rico. Part of his "Bird-Effigy" bowl collection was acquired by Jesse Walter Fewkes in 1919.

== Death, honors and accolades ==
Neumann Gandia died in Cherbourg, France, on 9 September 1913, the same year his last book Verdadera y Auténtica Historia de la Ciudad de Ponce was published. In San Juan there is a public housing development named after him. There is also a middle school in Ponce honoring his memory and contributions. He is also recognized at Ponce's Park of Illustrious Ponce Citizens.

== Works by Neumann Gandia ==
The following are works by Eduardo Neumann Gandia:

- La Exposición de Filadelfia y el Movimiento intelectual en la Unión Americana. 1877.
- Hojas Sueltas: Viajes por los Estados Unidos de America, La Exposición de Paris y España. 1879.
- Estudios Astronómicos. 1880.
- Elementos de Analogía. 1880.
- Elementos de Sintaxis, Análisis Lógico y Ejercicios de Composición. 1881.
- Nociones de Aritmética. 1884.
- Importancia social del Maestro y estado de Instrucción en Puerto Rico. 1889.
- Las Escuelas de Adultos: Su Organización y Metodología. 1890.
- Reforma de la Segunda Enseñanza. 1890.
- Estudio Histórico Sobre el Asedio de los Ingleses a la Capital en 1797. ca. 1893.
- Benefactores y hombres notables de Puerto-Rico: bocetos biográficos-críticos con un estudio sobre nuestros gobernadores generales. Obra exornada profusamente con hermosos fotograbados. Volume I. 1899. Ponce, Puerto Rico: Establecimiento Tipográfico "La Libertad" (Calle Sol #3). 1896.
- Benefactores y hombres notables de Puerto-Rico: bocetos biográficos-críticos. Obra exornada profusamente con hermosos fotograbados. Volume II. Ponce, Puerto Rico: Imprenta del "Listín Comercial" (Calle Villa #4). 1899.
- La Independencia Americana y el Gobierno Civil. 1899.
- Impresiones de viaje por Norte America. Eduardo Neumann Gandía. (New York: F. J. Dassori. 108 Park Row.) 1910.
- Verdadera y Auténtica historia de la Ciudad de Ponce desde sus primitivos tiempos hasta la época contemporánea: Resultado de prolijas investigaciones, libres de errores, fecha irrefutable de su fundación hallada por el autor, datos nuevos apoyados en documentos inéditos, efemérides originales, noticias cronológicas, mapas antiguos y modernos, infinitos fotograbados y retratos de personajes.'' (Originally printed in April 1913 in Ponce, Puerto Rico.) Reprinted by Instituto de Cultura Puertorriqueña. San Juan, Puerto Rico. 1987.

== See also ==
- Ponce, Puerto Rico
- List of Puerto Ricans
