= Vicente Julbe =

Mayor of Ponce, Puerto Rico

Coronel Vicente Julbe

54th Mayor of Ponce, Puerto Rico
- In office 1 October 1851 – 14 February 1854
- Preceded by: Guillermo Neumann
- Succeeded by: Julio Duboc

Personal details
- Born: c. 1800
- Died: c. 1860
- Profession: Military

Vicente Julbe (c. 1800 – c. 1860) was Mayor of Ponce, Puerto Rico, from 1 October 1851 to 14 February 1854. (Note: Socorro Girón states Vicente Julbe's position was that of a corregidor, a person named by the King to act as mayor.(Socorro Girón. Ponce, el Teatro La Perla y La Campana de la Almudaina. Gobierno Municipal de Ponce. Ponce, Puerto Rico. 1992. page 52.)) He was a Spanish military officer with the rank of Coronel.

== Mayoral term ==
Julbe is remembered for an edict he issued in October 1852. It stipulated that all homeowners were responsible for building a sidewalk in front of the houses. The sidewalk was to be 45 inches wide, have a slight inclination towards the street for rain water runoff, and be made of bricks.

== See also ==
- List of Puerto Ricans
- List of mayors of Ponce, Puerto Rico

== Notes ==
Political offices
Preceded by Guillermo Neumann	Mayor of Ponce, Puerto Rico; 1 October 1851 – 14 February 1854	Succeeded by Julio Duboc
