= Ramón Marín =

Puerto Rican polymath (1832–1902)

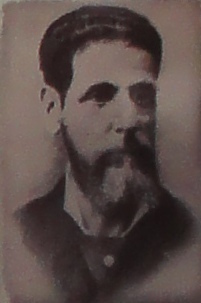
- Ramón Marín Solá, circa 1870
- Born: 12 January 1832; Arecibo, Puerto Rico
- Died: 13 September 1902; San Juan, Puerto Rico
- Occupations: Historian, journalist, educator, politician, writer
- Spouses: María Amalia Castilla; Candelaria Marien
- Children: Vicente, Ramón, Américo, Alejandro, and Eduardo; Amalia and Aurora

Ramón Marín Solá (12 January 1832 – 13 September 1902) was a Puerto Rican educator, journalist, politician, historian, poet, and playwright. He is best remembered for his 1875 historical masterpiece, "Las fiestas populares de Ponce."

== Early life ==
Ramón Marín Solá was born in Arecibo, Puerto Rico, on 2 January 1832 and died in San Juan, Puerto Rico, on 13 September 1902. His parents were Vicente Marín and his slave Rosa. He studied at Arecibo's Liceo San Felipe and in 1850, at 18 years old, he moved to Cabo Rojo, Puerto Rico, to work as a teacher. He was an active member of Aurora Masonic Lodge in Ponce. He had two children, a son, Americo Marín Castillo, and a daughter, Aurora.

== Career ==
=== Teacher ===
It was during his time as a teacher in Cabo Rojo that Ramón Marín started his career as a writer. Marín's was first published on 20 August 1853, in the "El Ponceño" news weekly, a publication from Ponce, Puerto Rico. He submitted several other writings that were also published. In 1856 Marín Sola graduated as a teacher.

In 1860, Marín moved to Yabucoa, Puerto Rico, where he founded a school. In 1866 Marín Sola established at his school in Yabucoa the first school for adults on the island. While in Yabucoa, Marín was a survivor of the 1867 San Narciso Hurricane.

=== Journalist ===
Marín moved to the city of Ponce during the tumultuous years of the late 1860s, joining Manuel Gregorio Tavárez and Manuel Zeno Gandia.

On 21 May 1874, Marín founded his first newspaper "El Avisador." In May 1875 he published his second paper in Ponce, "La Crónica de Ponce", later renamed "La Crónica". In 1880 Marín also became the director of Roman Baldorioty de Castro's paper, the first paper founded to defend the autonomist ideals of the time. In December 1885, Ramón Marín published a 72-page pamphlet titled "Las Fiestas Populares de Ponce".

In October 1881, Marín cofounded with Mario Braschi "El Pueblo", an evening paper printed every other day. Papers during those years did not last long due to the colonial government's oppression of the freedom of the press. On 7 October 1887, he founded "El Popular", also as a result of the oppression of the colonial government.

=== Politician ===
In 1879, Marín was selected clerk of the electoral commission in Ponce. On 19 February 1886, Ramón Marín became part of the founding committee of the Partido Liberal Puertorriqueño together with Martin Corchado, Rafael Pujals and others. Also with Pujals, Corchado and others, Marín was signatory of the Plan de Ponce, a "carta magna" seeking freedom from the Spanish imperialists. In 1887 Marín and Baldorioty de Castro were arrested by the colonial authorities as they attempted to travel to Spain to denounce before the Spanish Cortes the oppression of the colonial government on the people of Puerto Rico via the "Compontes" – forced removal of citizens from their homes for detention by the authorities without any charges. They were later transferred to the jail at El Morro in San Juan. The young pharmacist Juan Arrillaga Cortes, aided by Xavier Mariani, Olimpio Otero, and others, would later successfully make the trip to Madrid to denounce the atrocities of the colonial government in Puerto Rico.

=== Playwright ===
Marín's theatrical works were presented at Teatro La Perla in Ponce. Among his best remembered works are "El Hijo del Amor" (The son of love) and "Lazos de Amor" (Bonds of love).

== Family life ==
On 5 September 1856 Marín Sola married María Amalia Castilla. Together they had five sons: Vicente, Ramón, Americo, Alejandro, and Eduardo. They also had two daughters: Amalia and Aurora. His daughter Amalia Marín would later marry Luis Muñoz Rivera, a young man whom Ramón Marín mentored. One child from that marriage, Luis, would later become the first elected governor of Puerto Rico. Ramon's wife, María Amalia Castilla Beiro died on 6 May 1873, at the age of 28, and Marín then married Candelaria Marien with whom he lived the rest of his life. Ramón Marín on September 13, 1902, in San Juan, Puerto Rico, he was buried at Santa María Magdalena de Pazzis Cemetery in San Juan.

== Honors and recognitions ==
In Arecibo there is a public housing development named after him. In Ponce, there is a school named after him. In Guaynabo there is an elementary school carrying his name in Urbanización Luis Muñoz Rivera.

He is also honored at Ponce's Park of Illustrious Ponce Citizens, both as a historian, as well as a journalist. Together with Federico Degetau, Ramon Marin is the only honoree to be honored for contributions in more than one field at the park.

== Works ==
- Las fiestas populares de Ponce. 1875. Reprint (Rio Piedras: Editorial de la Universidad de Puerto Rico, 1994).

== See also ==
- Ponce, Puerto Rico
- List of Puerto Ricans
