= Guillermo Neumann =

Mayor of Ponce, Puerto Rico

53rd Mayor of Ponce, Puerto Rico
- In office 23 April 1851 – 30 September 1851
- Preceded by: Manuel Cedeño de Poveda
- Succeeded by: Vicente Julbe

Personal details
- Born: c. 1800
- Died: c. 1860
- Children: Eduardo Neumann Gandia
- Profession: Politician

Guillermo Neumann (c. 1800 – c. 1860) was Mayor of Ponce, Puerto Rico, from 23 April 1851 to 30 September 1851. (Note: Socorro Girón states he was a "corregidor", a person chosen by the King to act as mayor.)

== Civil service ==
Neumann was the administrator of the Ponce Customs House in 1846.

== Family life ==
Guillermo Neumann was father to Eduardo Neumann Gandia, who would become a prolific historian.

== See also ==
- List of Puerto Ricans
- List of mayors of Ponce, Puerto Rico

== Notes ==
Political offices
Preceded by Manuel Cedeño de Poveda	Mayor of Ponce, Puerto Rico; 23 April 1851 - 30 September 1851	Succeeded by Vicente Julbe
