= Curtis Lepore =

American actor (born 1983)

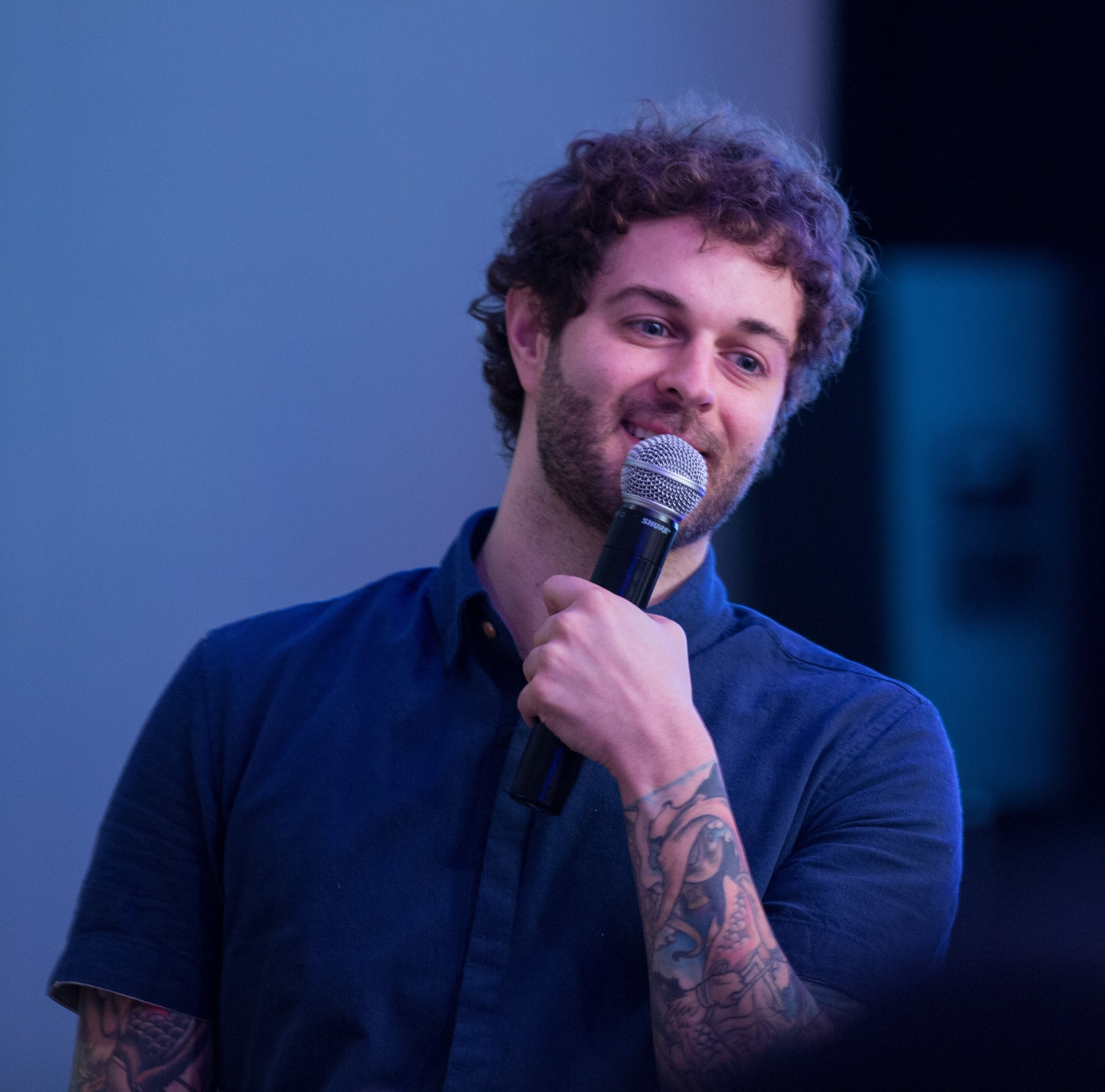
- Lepore in 2016
- Born: June 28, 1983 (age 43); Smithtown, New York, U.S.
- Education: State University of New York at Oswego
- Occupations: Vine star, musician
- Years active: 2009–present
- Known for: Vine skits

Curtis Lepore (born June 28, 1983) is an American actor, musician and internet celebrity who gained popularity on the short-form video sharing platform Vine in 2013. In August 2016, he was the seventh most popular user on Vine.

== Career ==
From 2009 to 2012, Curtis Lepore was the frontman and a founding member of the straight edge hardcore band GhostXShip from his hometown of Syracuse, New York. In 2012, Lepore left the band. Lepore later provided featured vocals on the song "Black Death" for beatdown hardcore band No Zodiac. Lepore and No Zodiac maintained close ties for many years. He also embarked on a European tour with No Zodiac in 2013, where he provided lead vocals substituting for the band's then-vocalist, Gerardo Pavon, who was unable to travel outside the country because of visa issues.

In January 2013, following his exit from GhostXShip, Lepore moved to Los Angeles, hoping to pursue a career in video-game graphics. While unemployed and couch-surfing at the homes of friends, he began posting videos on the app Vine. Lepore, who already had 20,000 Instagram followers on an account mostly dedicated to photos of his dog, Buster Beans, quickly gained popularity on the app. Many of Lepore's Vine videos involved collaborations with other Vine stars such as Lele Pons, Christian DelGrosso, and KingBach. By August of that year, he was one of the top 10 creators on Vine, with over 4 million followers. He was one of the first Vine creators to receive a brand endorsement, and one of the first clients of a Vine talent agency, GrapeStory.

Lepore was also part of the first Vine celebrity relationship with fellow video creator Jessi Smiles. The two met in person for the first time in Washington Square Park in New York as part of a public event arranged by their managers, which featured a live band, an appearance by Nev Schulman, the host of the MTV series Catfish, and a special hashtag to commemorate the event, and was attended by nearly 2,000 people.

Lepore and Smiles dated for less than a month, shortly after which he was arrested on charges of rape.

== Legal issues ==
In 2013, Lepore was alleged to have raped his then-girlfriend, Jessi Smiles. The incident occurred when Smiles was in Los Angeles. She had traveled there to visit him, but the two broke up shortly after her arrival. On August 31, Smiles hit her head while filming a video, sustaining a concussion. She stated that Lepore drove her to his house to help her while she was recovering, and once asleep, Lepore raped her. He was arrested in September 2013 on rape charges. Lepore, who pleaded not guilty, was released on $100,000 bail. In February 2014, Lepore took a plea deal in the case; the rape charges were dropped and he pleaded guilty to a lesser charge of felony assault. In February 2015, Lepore's felony assault charges were reduced to a misdemeanor. In December 2019, Lepore released a statement talking about the case.

== Personal life ==
Lepore was raised in Smithtown, New York. He attended SUNY Oswego before moving to Los Angeles. He is vegan and straight edge. He had a Boston Terrier named Buster Beans whom he adopted in 2010 from an elderly couple who could no longer care for him. As of March 2015, Buster had over a million of his own followers on Vine. Buster died later in 2016. Lepore is actively involved in a variety of national and local charitable organizations, such as Stuff-A-Truck, a project which focuses on donating toys to underprivileged children.

== Filmography ==
=== Music videos ===
Year	Artist	Title	Role	Notes
2014	Bart Baker	"Wiggle Parody"	Anthony Wiggle	
