= Periódico La Esquina =

Newspaper in Puerto Rico

Periódico La Esquina is a newspaper in Puerto Rico which is only available in the east part of the island.

== See also ==
- List of newspapers in Puerto Rico
