= Tribunal del Pueblo =

Puerto Rican digital newspaper

- Front page of Tribunal del Pueblo for 28 June 2019
- Type: Daily online newspaper
- Owner(s): Boriken Blockchains LLC (Boriken Blockchains)
- Founder(s): Samuel Ortiz Ramos, Alexander Sanchez Maldonado; Samuel Beníquez
- Publisher: Boriken Blockchains LLC
- Editor: Samuel Ortiz Ramos
- Founded: 2018; 7 years ago (as Tribunal del Pueblo); Guaynabo, Puerto Rico
- Language: Spanish
- Headquarters: Gurabo, Puerto Rico
- Website: www.tribunaldelpueblo.com

Tribunal del Pueblo (English: People's Court) is the multiplatform Puerto Rico newspaper founded in 2018. Today it is a subsidiary of Boriken Blockchains LLC. Its headquarters are located in Gurabo, Puerto Rico.

== Tribunal del Pueblo ==
Tribunal del Pueblo was founded in 2018 in the city of Guaynabo by the businessman, producer, musician and Emmy nominee, Samuel Beníquez. In 2019 it became the only online newspaper that created a special section called Borikwood, which is the alias created exclusively by Boriken Blockchains LLC to be used only in the newspaper Tribunal del Pueblo to inform about the Puerto Rico film industry, located in the Caribbean. The term was created by them with premeditation to refer to the entire Puerto Rican film and creative industry. The word Borikwood is a play on words between "Borik" (referring to Borikén, name with which the natives of the Taino tribe called the island, which over time evolved to the name of Borínquen, name that is still used in reference to Puerto Rico, hence the name "boricua") and the other word "Hollywood", capital of the US film industry. From archipelago Puerto Rico, innumerable talents have marked the history of Hollywood in cinematography, as well as in music. The Tribunal del Pueblo created this section, to inform primarily all Puerto Ricans living in the diaspora about everything that is happening in Borikwood and inform the world's fans of Puerto Rican talent and creativity, because until that time no other newspaper, printed, nor online, had a section entirely dedicated to this industry and the name Borikwood had never existed before.

== See also ==
- List of newspapers in Puerto Rico
