= Martín Corchado =

Puerto Rican physician (1839–1898)

Dr. Martín Corchado
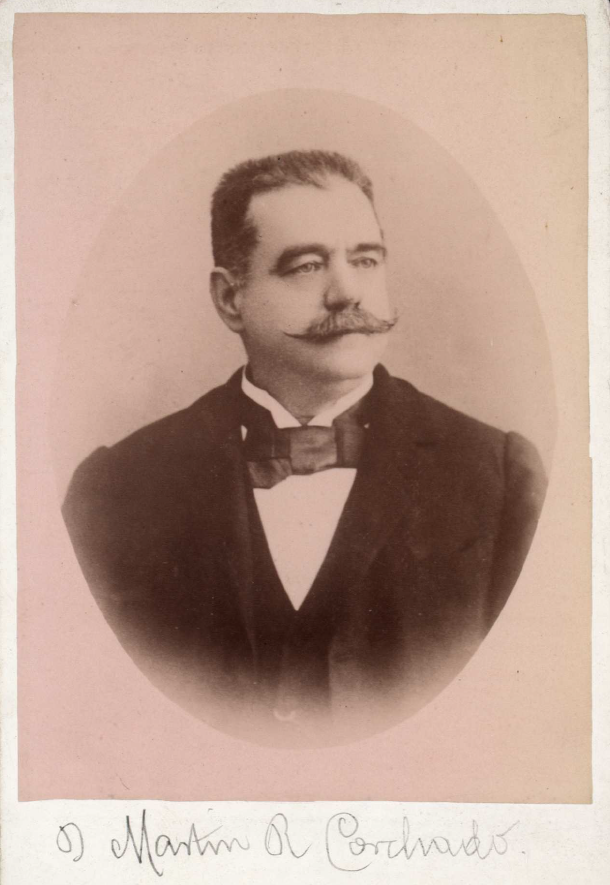
- "One of the most eminent Puerto Rican medical researchers of the nineteenth century."
- Born: 25 April 1839; Isabela, Puerto Rico
- Died: 2 April 1898 (aged 58); Ponce, Puerto Rico
- Education: University of Barcelona, ca. 1878. Complutense University of Madrid, 1880.
- Years active: 1880 - 1898
- Known for: Provided free medical care to the needy
- Medical career
- Profession: Physician, Medical researcher, Politician
- Institutions: Hospital Tricoche
- Sub-specialties: Ophthalmology
- Research: Tuberculosis

Martín Corchado (25 April 1839 – 2 April 1898) was a nineteenth-century Puerto Rican physician who excelled in charitable medical services as well as in the field of medical research. He owned the first microscope brought to Puerto Rico, which he used to do research on tuberculosis.

== Early life ==
Martín R. Corchado y Juarbe was born on 25 April 1839 in Isabela, Puerto Rico. His parents were Juan Eugenio Corchado and Juana Eugenia Juarbe. He was the elder brother to Manuel Corchado y Juarbe. He moved to Ponce around 1874.

== Schooling ==
Corchado y Juarbe studied medicine at the University of Barcelona, where he graduated with a bachelor's degree in medicine. He then moved to Madrid where in 1880 received his doctoral degree in medicine at the Complutense University of Madrid. Subsequently, Corchado then lived in Paris, France, where he studied ophthalmology. Corchado was one of the first Puerto Ricans to work under Louis Pasteur in his institute in Paris.

== Career ==
After this, he returned to Puerto Rico to practice medicine, settling in Ponce, Covering the years 1885-1889, Corchado was the second medical director of Hospital Tricoche (after Rafael Pujals). He stood out for providing free medical services to the residents of Ponce and nearby towns. He provided medical services to the poor, those in prison, and acted as a forensic physician in courts of law.

=== Research ===
Corchado owned the first microscope brought to Puerto Rico. He researched and studied tuberculosis and published his results in the publications of the time, including "El Vapor". Corchado has been recorded as being "one of the most eminent Puerto Rican medical researchers of the nineteenth century."

== Political views ==
A believer in the political autonomy for Puerto Rico from Spain, Corchado was also president of the Puerto Rico Autonomist Party, and one of the signers of the Plan de Ponce with Roman Baldorioty de Castro, Antonio E. Molina, Guillermo Oppenheimer, Pedro Salazar, Luis Gautier, Lazaro Martinez, Marcial Morales, Rafael Pujals, Ramon Marin, Enrique Cabrera and Jose Ramon Abad.

== Death ==
Corchado died in Ponce on 2 April 1898 from complications from a cold when, not wanting to take time off to attend to his own health, he continued providing medical care to the needy. He was 59 years old.

== Honors and recognitions ==
In Ponce, there is a street in the Mariani sector of barrio Segundo of the Ponce Historic Zone area named after him. He is also recognized at Ponce's Park of Illustrious Ponce Citizens.

== See also ==
- Ponce, Puerto Rico
- List of Puerto Ricans
- Médicos notables del Antaño Ponceño. Lorenzo A. Balasquide. Instituto de Cultura Puertorriqueña, San Juan, 1984. Pages: 67. (Nine biographies of Ponce doctors from the nineteenth century: Dr. Rafael Pujals, Dr. Gabriel Villaronga, Dr. Virgilio Biaggi, Dr. Eusebio Coronas y Fernández, Dr. Martín Corchado, Dr. José Julio Henna, Dr. Juan Iglesias Genebriera, Dr. Manuel Antonio Zavala Rodríguez y Dr. Manuel Pasarell Rius.)
