= Manuel Zeno Gandía =

Puerto Rican writer (1855–1930)

- Manuel Zeno Gandía
- Born: January 10, 1855; Arecibo, Puerto Rico
- Died: January 30, 1930 (aged 75); San Juan, Puerto Rico
- Occupations: Physician; poet; novelist; journalist; politician
- Relatives: Eduardo Neumann Gandía (cousin)
- Writing career
- Notable work: La Charca

Manuel Zeno Gandía (January 10, 1855 – January 30, 1930) was a Puerto Rican physician, poet, novelist, journalist and politician. He is best known as the author of La Charca (The Pond), a novel considered by many to be the first Puerto Rican novel.

== Early years ==
Zeno Gandía was born in Arecibo, Puerto Rico, to wealthy land-owning parents. After receiving his primary and secondary education in his hometown, he went to Spain where he studied medicine at the Colegio de Cirugía de San Carlos de Madrid. He graduated with the titles of Doctor in Medicine and Surgeon. He developed his love for political literature during his stay in Spain. His interest in politics led him to become an outspoken advocate for colonial reform. Eduardo Neumann Gandía was his cousin.

== Physician, poet and novelist ==
When Zeno Gandía returned to Puerto Rico, he set up his medical practice in the city of Ponce. While in Ponce, Zeno Gandia was medical director at the Port of Ponce "in the years up to 1895". It was during this time that Zeno Gandia wrote La Charca. In 1894, he published La Charca (The Pond), "Considered the greatest Puerto Rican novel of the 19th century". The novel's plot deals with the harsh life in the remote and mountainous coffee regions in Puerto Rico. This naturalist novel speaks of the injustices the poor farm worker suffered at the hands of rich landowners. La Charca is a Puerto Rican classic and is one of four novels in Las Crónicas de un Mundo enfermo (Chronicles of a Sick World). The other three are Garduña, El Negocio (The Business) and Redentores (The Redeemers). These novels were also written while Zeno Gandia was a physician in Barrio Playa, Ponce. El Negocio was published in 1922. In the 1960s, Zeno Gandía's best-known novel, La Charca was translated to English by Kal Wagenheim. In English, it remains in print as The Pond, and is published by Markus Wiener Publishers of Princeton, New Jersey. Zeno Gandia had published many poems prior to writing La Charca. Among these poems were La Señora Duquesa and Abismo.

== Journalist ==
While in Ponce, Zeno Gandia was already politically active and, as many others during this time in Puerto Rico, he used the press to publish his political ideas. With Amy Braschi, he founded in Ponce the paper El Estudio in 1896. Around 1900, he also founded La Opinion and led it as its editor. In 1902, he then bought La Correspondencia and directed it until 1914. To keep up with his growing journalism business, he imported Puerto Rico's first monotype press and its first Rotary printing press.

== Politician and independence advocate ==
Zeno Gandia was the first Puerto Rican to propose the creation of an independence party for Puerto Rico. After Puerto Rico was invaded by American forces during the Spanish–American War in 1898, Zeno Gandía traveled to Washington, D.C. where, together with Eugenio María de Hostos, he proposed the idea of independence for Puerto Rico. The men were disappointed when their ideas were rejected by the government of the United States and the island was converted into a territory. Zeno Gandía returned to the island where he continued to write and was politically active. As a member of the Puerto Rico Union Party, he also advocated allowing voters to choose among non-colonial options, including annexation, an independent protectorate and autonomy. Under the American Government installed in Puerto Rico, Zeno Gandia was a member of the Puerto Rico House of Representatives in 1900 and in 1907. In 1912, Zeno Gandía joined the Independence Party, a new political party founded by Rosendo Matienzo Cintrón which promoted Puerto Rico's independence. That same year, Zeno Gandía together with Matienzo Cintrón and Luis Lloréns Torres wrote a manifesto which stated that it was time for Puerto Rico to have its independence. Their Independence Party, which also included Eugenio Benítez Castaño and Pedro Franceschi as founding members, was the first party in Puerto Rico's history to plead for Puerto Rico's independence and it established a precedent for future organizations with similar ideologies.

== Legacy ==
Zeno Gandía died in Santurce, Puerto Rico, in 1930. He was buried at the Puerto Rico Memorial in Carolina, Puerto Rico. Manuel Zeno Gandía memory was honored by naming a school and avenues after him. In his native Arecibo, the credit cooperative and an industrial park are named after Zeno Gandía. An 11-foot-high (3.4 m) statue of him was unveiled on 27 March 2007, by Senate President Kenneth McClintock on the grounds of Puerto Rico's Capitol, to honor Zeno Gandía, with Zeno Gandia's grandchildren, great-grandchildren and great-great-grandchildren in attendance. Zeno Gandia is recognized at Ponce's Tricentennial Park for his contributions in the field of literature.

== See also ==
- List of Puerto Rican writers
- List of Puerto Ricans
- Puerto Rican literature
