= La Perla del Sur =

Puerto Rican newspaper

- La Noticia Que Te Llega
- Type: Weekly newspaper
- Format: Tabloid
- Owner(s): Nogueras family (until 15 June 2022); Abel Misla Villalba (since 16 June 2022)
- Founder(s): Juan J. Nogueras de la Cruz
- Publisher: Juno Printing (until 15 June 2022); The Urban Media House (since 15 September 2022)
- President: Juan J. Nogueras Soroeta (until 15 June 2022); Javier de Jesús Martínez (since 15 September 2022)
- Editor: Omar Alfonso
- Founded: 3 November 1982
- Language: Spanish
- Headquarters: Ponce, Puerto Rico
- Circulation: 75,000
- Website: www.periodicolaperla.com

La Perla del Sur is a weekly online Spanish-language newspaper based in Ponce, Puerto Rico, catering to a regional audience. It started as a printed paper distributed in nine towns in southern Puerto Rico and had a circulation of 75,000. It also had an Internet portal where the entire printed version of the paper could be accessed. It was founded in 1983. After a three-month hiatus from June to September 2022, the paper re-opened as an online-only paper on 15 September 2022 under new ownership.

== History ==
The newspaper was founded in Ponce in 1983 by Juan Nogueras de la Cruz with a crew of six employees. It was first published every other week, had 32 pages and a circulation of 40,000 copies. At first it circulated only in Ponce and Juana Diaz, but a year after its foundation it started circulating also in the towns of Santa Isabel, Coamo, Guayanilla, Peñuelas and Yauco.

In its beginnings the paper was printed by a third party, but starting on 2 February 1993, the paper started publishing at Juno Printing, a wholly owned subsidiary of La Perla del Sur. The paper was known as "El periódico de Ponce y la región Sur de Puerto Rico." (The Newspaper and Southern region of Puerto Rico). It was a weekly newspaper, published on Wednesdays.

Until its final print run, the paper was distributed, free of charge, in the towns of Ponce, Peñuelas, Guayanilla, Yauco, Santa Isabel, Villalba, Juana Diaz, Salinas, and Coamo. The company had approximately 30 employees.

The paper ceased publication on 15 June 2022 in its printed form, and reappeared, under new ownership, as an electronic online-only paper on 15 September 2022, exactly three months later.

== Reception ==
In 2012, it received an award for its coverage of Gasoducto del Norte in the category of investigative reporting specifically for "El tiempo desmiente la Vía Verde" (Time unmasks Via Verde) article series. The presenter of the award, the Puerto Rico Newspaper Association, stated the series was "a well-developed and well-written work. The reporting does away with the myth that regional newspapers are not interested in subjects involving national issues".

== See also ==
- List of newspapers in Puerto Rico
