= Voxxi =

News website

VOXXI
- Company type: Private
- Industry: News Website
- Founder: Emilio Sánchez and Salomon Melgen
- Area served: Worldwide
- Website: www.voxxi.com

Voxxi, stylized as VOXXI, was an online newspaper that was launched by Spaniard journalist Emilio Sánchez (former EFE staff) and investor Salomon Melgen in 2011 but was shut down in 2015 amidst Melgen being charged for fraud by the US Justice Department, along with the company's unsuccessful business strategy. The news site was created in order to distribute content for Latino individuals whose dominant language was English, in competition with services provided by English-based news services looking to expand their influence in the Latino marketplace.

== History ==
At its 2011 launch at the Newseum in Washington, D.C., Voxxi partnered with the National Hispanic Foundation for the Arts in the promotion of the advancement of Latino people in America. In 2013, Voxxi stopped publishing health content and instead launched a stand-alone site called Saludify as part of a vertical site strategy consisting of "launching targeted niche sites to offer advertisers very desirable audiences" under the Voxxi umbrella. Saludify.com had a variety of health-related sections including "prevention", "psychology", "fitness", "nutrition", "sexuality", "health news" and "children's health", among others.

VOXXI started operation with a number of staff members, including developers, marketing specialists, editors, social media managers and a large pool of writers and contributors. The online newspaper was successful. Sanchez and Melgen decided to switch gears in 2013 and continue operation with only three people on staff, a handful of interns and a few writers. Subsequently, site traffic for Voxxi and Saludify steeply and significantly declined.

In 2014, Sanchez associated with "InteractiveONE" in an effort to return to the previously successful strategies, but the partnership was unsuccessful. In March 2015, VOXXI and Saludify quietly shut down. Sanchez later admitted in written statement that this was partly due to the failure in building enough traffic to secure revenue. "A lack of funding, erroneous strategy, fierce competition, insufficient web traffic and other market factors have forced the shutdown of VOXXI, three years after its launch," explained Media Moves.
