= El Nuevo Día =

Puerto Rican daily newspaper

- Front page of El Nuevo Día for 26 July 2008
- Type: Daily newspaper
- Format: Tabloid (soon to be digital only)
- Owner: Grupo Ferré-Rangel (GFR Media)
- Founder(s): Guillermo V. Cintrón, Eugenio Astol; Nemesio Canales (assistants)
- Publisher: El Día, Inc
- Editor: Luis Alberto Ferré Rangel
- Founded: 1909; 117 years ago (as El Diario de Puerto Rico); Ponce, Puerto Rico
- Language: Spanish
- Headquarters: Guaynabo, Puerto Rico
- Circulation: 22,000 Digital Subscribers
- Website: elnuevodia.com

El Nuevo Día (English: The New Day) is the newspaper with the largest circulation in Puerto Rico. It is considered the territory's newspaper of record. El Nuevo Día was founded in 1909 in Ponce, Puerto Rico, and is a subsidiary of GFR Media. It is headquartered in Guaynabo, Puerto Rico.

== History ==
=== Original run as El Dia ===
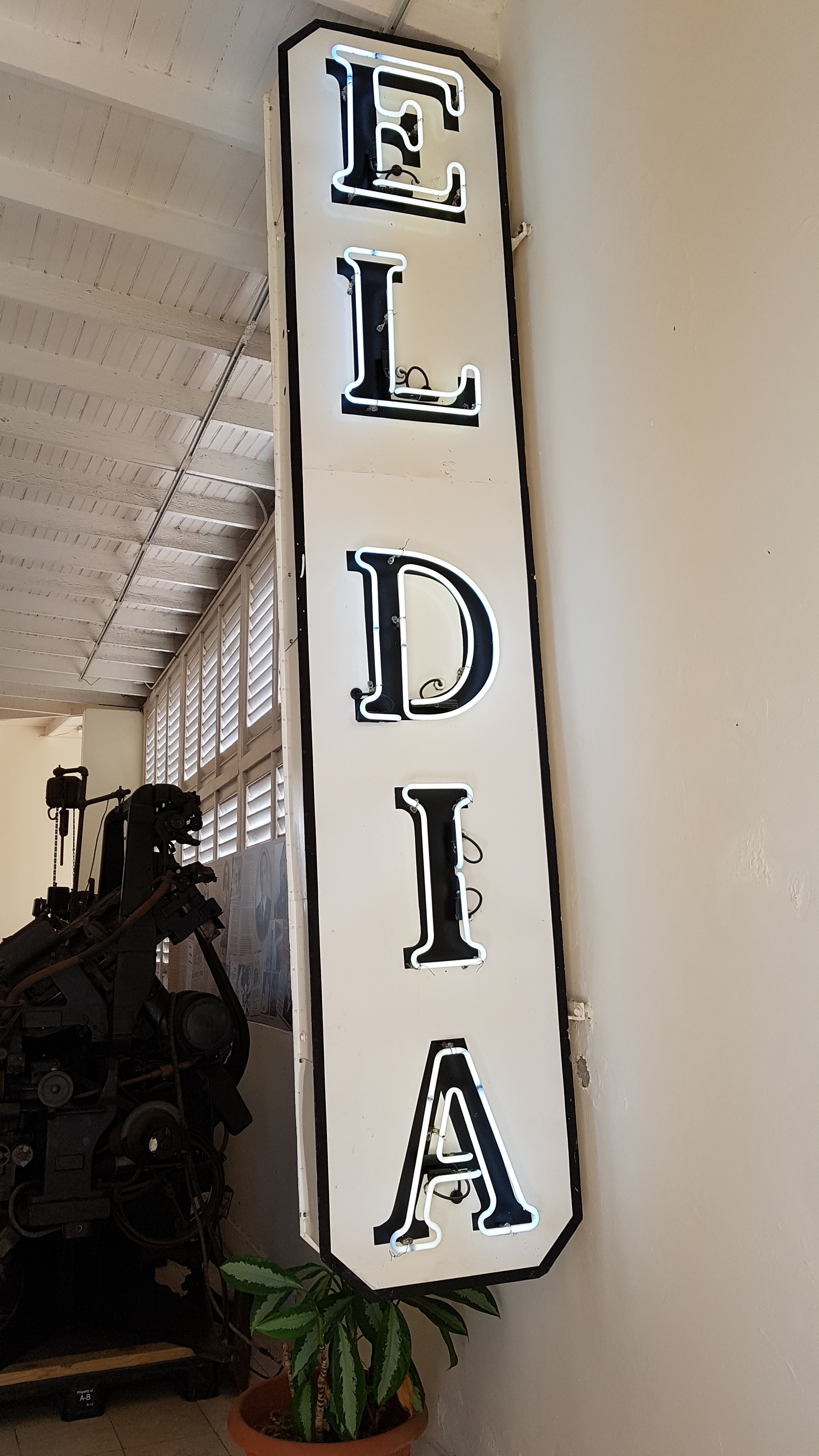
Sign from former headquarters of the El Día newspaper, while on Calle Salud, Ponce (1945–1970), now on display at Museo de la Historia de Ponce

El Nuevo Día was founded in 1909 in the city of Ponce as "El Diario de Puerto Rico," (Note: From 1909 to 1911, the newspaper was called "El Diario de Puerto Rico". In 1911 it shortened its name to "El Día", a name it would carry until its 1970 move to San Juan and reorganization, where it was renamed "El Nuevo Día". In 1950, under Luis A. Ferre's directorship, El Día adopted its first slogan, "El Decano de la Prensa Puertorriqueña" (English: The dean of the Puerto Rican press"). Years later, it took on the slogan "Periódico político defensor de los ideales de la Unión de Puerto Rico y de los intereses generales del país." (English: "A political newspaper defender of the ideals of the Unión de Puerto Rico and the general interests of the [Puerto Rican] country").) later changing its name to "El Día" in 1911, a name it kept for nearly seven decades. Its founder was Guillermo V. Cintrón, with assistance from Eugenio Astol and Nemesio Canales. Its editorial staff consisted of Felix Matos Bernier, Juan Braschi, Nemesio R. Canales, Felix Astol, and Eugenio Deschamps. El Día was a regional newspaper from Ponce that covered regional news with occasional sensationalism.

In 1928 Guillermo V. Cintron sold the paper to Guillermo Vivas Valdivieso who formed an editorial team consisting of the three Gil De Lamadrid brothers (Jesus, Joaquin and Alfredo), Enrique Colon Barega, and Julio Enrique Monagas, and published the paper until 1945. Under his directorship the paper also started distribution in San Juan, Puerto Rico. On 8 November 1945, the newspaper was acquired by Ponce native and future governor Luis A. Ferré. The cement magnate converted its narrative into a pro-statehood publication, placing it in one of the factions promoting options to solve the status issue. Its board of directors consisted of Raul Matos Balaguer, Arturo Gallardo Guerrero, Miguel Sotero Palermo, Juan A. Wirshing, and Luis A. Ferre. After Ferré was elected governor of Puerto Rico in 1968, his eldest son, Antonio Luis Ferré, purchased the paper from his father for a dollar. The paper's slogan was "Y vivamos la moral, que es lo que nos hace falta" (roughly, "And let us live by the moral yardstick, which is what we lack"). Gustavo Cubas and Benito del Cueto, both linked to the Ferré family, were intended to join the paper from the get go.

=== Launch of El Nuevo Día ===
Two years after this, Antonio Luis moved the newspaper to San Juan and renamed it "El Nuevo Día". The first edition under this rebrand was published on May 18, 1970, amidst socioeconomic changes and political clashes, with Antonio Luis Ferré stating that the paper would favor statehood. El Nuevo Día entered into an alliance with Ferré's Partido Nuevo Progresista (PNP), echoing the institutional stances. Despite this, Antonio Luis Ferré portrayed his editorial line as neutral, claiming that it only covered what was news. Debuting during Luis A. Ferré's final year as governor, El Nuevo Día only covered the government's official versions during this timeframe. When the Comisión de Derechos Civiles investigated the objectivity of the Puerto Rican press, Antonio Luis Ferré declined participating in the process. This process led to the Consejo de Prensa being proposed to safeguard freedom of press. It also inspired Robert Anderson's La prensa en Puerto Rico.

This placed it at odds with several competing newspapers, with pro-independence Claridad denounced that despite having three times less distribution as El Imparcial, the paper received more government advertising. Gratuitous distribution was employed as a loophole to avoid legal conflict.Luis A. Ferré prohibited the presence of Claridad in the press conferences at La Fortaleza, citing that it was a political publication. The paper was banned until restrictions were lifted to allow a statehooder paper. El Mundo was critical of the Luis A. Ferré administration, leading to the rejection of the statehooders (who argued that it favored the PPD). Despite being generally apathetic to party-based politics, The San Juan Star would denounce corruption scandals during the Ferré administration.

The paper's first director under Antonio Luis Ferre was Carlos Castañeda from Cuba, who was wrestled away from El Mundo, which unsuccessfully tried to retain his services. Graphic designer José Díaz de Villegas were brought in by El Nuevo Día to complete the "daily magazine" format. Dimas Planas (previously of The San Juan Star) and Saúl Pérez Lozano completed the newspaper director. Ferré, himself a Cuban descendant, brought in exile members including Díaz de Villegas, general manager Gustavo Cubas, production manager Rodolfo Martínez and sales manager Alfredo Arias. The only Puerto Rican in a prominent position was Fernando Sánchez, who was in charge of circulation. Other members of the staff were Hugo del Cañal, Fernando Heydrich, Eduardo Valero, Rafael Carrasquillo, Ray García, Ángel Alonso, Sergio Peréz Grau, José Prados Herrero, José A. Collado, Ariel Ortiz Tellechea, Rafael López Rosas and Ismael Fernández.

During its first years in San Juan, El Nuevo Día's newsroom was located in the "Torre de la Reina" building, near the Luis Muñoz Rivera Park in Puerta de Tierra. Publishers Group was employed, impossing the use of illustrations and photos along concise headlines. Employing a presentation format that was new to the local press, the publication found a following. Castañeda emphasized design, topography and cartoon, also giving preferential treatment to photographers (a first among local newspapers) that included additional training, salaries equal to those of journalists and participation in all field assignments. Times was used 8.5 in 9 points and sans serif was used 9 in 10 points. An added emphasis on image quality that introduced lab techniques, avoided the use of flash and equipped the four photographers in the staff wit 35 mm Nikon cameras and 200 ASA film was used for sharper image quality.

Articles were confined in as little space as possible, an attempt to avoid "page jumping" and streamline reading. All these changes were attempts to attract 1970s youth, which were perceived as being trained by television culture to rely on visual input and lacked a "reading culture". El Nuevo Día also had a commercial press. Emphasis was given to sports, show business, law enforcement and other topics besides politics. Its coverage of Roberto Clemente's performance for the World Series-winning Pittsburgh Pirates and Marisol Malaret's Miss Universe victory popularized this approach. Gloria Leal was brought in to write sections targeted towards women, a job that had been previously refined by Castañeda and evolved into the long-running Por Dentro section.

During its early years, El Nuevo Día did not give emphasis to academics. Edgardo Rodríguez Juliá is one of the few academics to join the paper. The creation of the Asociación de Periodistas (ASPRO) and a journalism program at the UPR coincided with this. El Nuevo Día moved 16,000 copies its first year, duplicating this to 30,000 the following year. Within three years, the number had risen to 120, 000. The working environment created by low wages and foreign directors in El Mundo created miscontent among its employees, who failed to reach agreements during eight months of negotiations. The ensuing strike began on February 11, 1972, and extended until October, allowing El Nuevo Día to capitalize and displace the paper. The process featured numerous legal measures from both sides and clashes between the protesters and the police.

This motivated other groups including PIP, PSP, FUPI, FEPI and MOU to support the union workers. This resulted in the helicopters used by the administration of El Mundo, in an attempt to overcome the strike and weaken the syndicate by continuing to publish with sympathetic employees, being disabled. Claridad joined a boycott. Meanwhile, PNP lawmakers and functionaries such as Mario Gaztambide, Rafael Llovet, Ramón Rivera Valentín and Frank Romero-besides the party's base- supported the process due to perceiving El Mundo as an enemy. The government itself aided in extending the conflict by contracting the strikers. Ultimately, the union workers prevailed and defeated the administration's attempt to exclude circulation from syndicate protection. Ferré used his position within both El Nuevo Día and the PNP administration to gather government support for the protests. The economic impact of losing revenue from publicity in an election year ultimately began a sharp decline for El Mundo, who could no longer move over 100,000 copies. In 1974, the newspaper also lost chief of redaction Miguel A. Santín to El Nuevo Día. By 1979, El Nuevo Día had surpassed El Mundo in distribution.

=== 1975-1989 ===
After the Ferré administration ended, the affiliation with statehood was toned down and not openly mentioned. Editorials were suspended for some time in 1975, but made a reappearance by the next year in sporadic form. Prior to the 1976 elections, the paper promoted voting for individual candidates, this while supporting Barceló. According to two studies on the matter, El Nuevo Día supported his reelection in 1980 and continued favoring the PNP until at least 1988. However, the friction between Barceló and the press following the Cerro Maravilla murders led to an editorial by Castañeda following his 1984 defeat.

While the topic was covered in The San Juan Star, Claridad and to a lesser extent El Mundo, El Nuevo Día ignored the early stages of the Cerro Maravilla murder case investigation. It wasn't until the Associated Press and the other local newspapers discussed contradictions in the version of governor Carlos Romero Barceló that director Roberto Fabricio published a piece on April 30, 1979. A damage control campaign by the administration ensued. As El Nuevo Día denounced Fabricio in an editorial by Castañeda (returning to the daily role after being promoted to editorial vice-president) on May 4, the director left the publication. The newspaper then adopted a conciliatory tone towards Romero Barceló, supporting the governor's proposal of a federal investigation. The family of the victims opposed the involvement of the United States, as clashes between independence groups and the FBI were in full swing during the 1970s. The situation was complicated, as El Nuevo Día adviser Héctor M. Laffitte was in charge of defending police officers accused of the murders, but the publication failed to publish a disclaimer about it during its coverage. During this time, Roberto Fabricio was selected as director of El Nuevo Día.

Entering the 1980s, El Nuevo Día had become print's mass communication leader, economically benefiting the Ferré family. During this decade, El Nuevo Día was critical of El Reportero, which they accused of supporting the PPD. The paper used its superior distribution to sway advertising away from the new publication. In contrast to the political and crime news emphasized in the covers of other papers, El Nuevo Día gave room to sports and other entertainment matters. This pattern was also seen in special sections. Jesús García led a sports department that had gained a second front page within El Nuevo Día. During this time, Ángel Olivieras allowed the recently graduated Amarilys Ortiz a role within the section, but denied her permanency based on gender. By 1985, El Nuevo Día was nearing 45% of the market. A year later, the publication was moving 200,000 daily copies and controlled 50% of the market. In 1986, to its current location municipality of Guaynabo, purchasing the building for 22 million dollars. With the end of both El Mundo and El Reportero, El Nuevo Día grew to control almost 60% by 1990 and 70% five years later.

=== 1990-2010 ===
García served as director of El Nuevo Día from 1990 to 1996, when he left the role to the Ferré siblings. Feeling that they could change society, the paper underwent a decentralization in its administration, bringing in younger educated journalists and attempted to include the average citizen in its news (though non partisan groups rarely made it to the cover). During this decade, El Nuevo Día supported the Centro de Libertad de Prensa of the Universidad del Sagrado Corazón and internships for UPR students. The Rosselló administration marked a departure from El Nuevo Día's historical support of the PNP, leading open conflict that resulted in the government withdrawing advertising from it. By the paper's 25th Anniversary, Ferré claimed that the publication never made an alliance with "any political party". The conflict between El Nuevo Día and Rosselló lasted from April 1997 to May 1999. It began with a piece on pay for play about a group named "Empresarios con Rosselló" leading to a suspension of advertising by the administration. After Rosselló extended his offensive against other Ferré corporations, the Sociedad Interamericana de Prensa confronted him, but were dismissed. The governor also cited that Antonio Luis Ferré had pressured the government by using El Nuevo Día's paper to discuss matter concerning other companies (which he felt was a hostile reminder of their influence in the media). A number of journalistic, civilian and professional organizations sided with the paper citing freedom of press. Ultimately, both sides reached an agreement in which Rosselló allowed advertising in the paper. During this conflict, El Nuevo Día made widespread use of federal sources. The struggle costed 20 million for the newspaper. Despite this, at one point, El Nuevo Día dominated media share in Puerto Rico, an inversion of the usual trend were newspapers trail television.

"El Nuevo Día" continues to be owned and published by the Ferré family. During the late 1990s, Luis Alberto Ferré joined as a journalist for environmental topics, while co-directing along his sister María Luisa. María Eugenia was placed in charge of marketing and sales. In April 1999, Luis Alberto became the sole director. He adopted a critical stance on the status of newspapers in Puerto Rico, in particular of what he referred to as "bipolar journalism" and a lack of introspection. In 2000, El Nuevo Día sponsored a series of academic activities on democracy and journalism where self-critic was a fixture. During the 2000s, María Eugenia became president of El Nuevo Día. María Lorenza, who worked marketing and sales for Primera Hora, was placed in charge of the paper's supplemental content.

Entering the 21st Century, journalist experienced a crisis bolstered by credibility issues product of the involvement of marketers and reader apathy. By 1996, Castañeda (who was still part of the board of El Nuevo Día) was publicly critical of the way in which conformism, bureaucracy and prioritizing money making has affected the local press. The introduction of the "Bombón de la Semana" during the 2000s served as an example of how marketing overcame journalism in the model of GFR's publications. Castañedas’ criticism included a book that he authored for the paper's 25th Anniversary or a 1996 conference, has not been republished afterwards. El Nuevo Día still used anonymous sources, which on occasion led to opinions and incomplete or unverifiable statements making way to its pages.

Despite portraying itself in a different light, celebrity news still made the cover of El Nuevo Día sporadically. "Por Dentro", "Domingo" and "En Grande" were dedicated to trivial topics, while intellectual projects like "Foro" and "Letras" were short lived and assimilated into the latter. The advent of its digital platform, endi.com, has led to El Nuevo Día recruiting young journalists to monitor the media and republish. The community initiatives created by El Nuevo Día are usually temporary in nature, though the introduction of blogs and editorials authored by external figures have allowed room for the reader. In addition to its political and community sections, El Nuevo Día also has sports, entertainment and business sections. Its previous television commercial campaign slogan read: El Nuevo Día: Un Gran Periodico ("El Nuevo Día: A Great Newspaper"). The campaign slogan recently changed to "El Nuevo Día: Conocer es Crecer" ("El Nuevo Día: To Know is to Grow"). A weekly supplement known as "La Gran Historia Ilustrada de Puerto Rico" was introduced in 2007.

From 2003 to 2008, El Nuevo Día had an Orlando edition called El Nuevo Día Orlando. It started publication on 2 September 2003 and was published on weekdays. When Primera Hora was launched, it was described as "Coke Diet" to El Nuevo Día's "Coca Cola". On 13 November 2009, the newspaper began to circulate free of charge. The paper printed 25,000 copies daily. A study showed that 96% percent of people who read the Orlando edition read it at home. The Orlando edition ceased publication on 29 August 2008. The newspaper's current president is María Eugenia Ferré Rangel and the current editor is Luis Alberto Ferré Rangel. Of the 209 millions El Nuevo Día made in 2005, 146 were in advertising. Until 2010, El Nuevo Día generated more revenue than all of its competitors collectively. During this decade it reached distribution of 300,000 copies for 75% of the market.

=== 2010-present ===
Its main competitor in terms of distribution is El Vocero. Content-wise, the papers have somewhat different news formats and audiences. While El Nuevo Día has been known largely for its political reporting, El Vocero has traditionally taken a more tabloid-oriented approach, giving greater prominence to news stories on daily street crime. More recently, however, "El Vocero" has begun to put greater emphasis to political and business news, making it a more direct competitor to "El Nuevo Día."

In September 2026, El Nuevo Día discontinued its print edition, becoming digital-only.

== Columnists ==
- Benjamín Torres Gotay
- Eduardo Lalo
- Fernando Cabanillas
- Geovanny Vicente
- Jaime Lluch
- José Curet
- Juan Zaragoza
- Mayra Montero
- Pedro Reina Pérez
- Rafael Cox Alomar
- Rosa Mercado
- Silverio Pérez

== Awards and recognitions ==
=== Critical reception ===
Journalist Luis Fernando Díaz calls it the "most complete model" of Puerto Rico's third wave of journalism and the most modern version of Puerto Rican journalism upon launch.

== See also ==
- List of newspapers in Puerto Rico
