= Channel 24 digital TV stations in the United States =

The following television stations broadcast on digital channel 24 in the United States:

- K24AG-D in Trapper Creek, Alaska
- K24BY-D in Pahrump, Nevada
- K24CH-D in Cortez, etc., Colorado
- K24CT-D in Alamogordo, New Mexico
- K24CY-D in St. George, Utah, on virtual channel 14, which rebroadcasts KJZZ-TV
- K24DD-D in Plevna, Montana
- K24DK-D in Bullhead City, Arizona
- K24DT-D in Aberdeen, South Dakota
- K24EY-D in Walker Lake, Nevada
- K24EZ-D in Idalia, Colorado, on virtual channel 20, which rebroadcasts KTVD
- K24FE-D in Beaver, etc., Utah
- K24FF-D in Lovelock, Nevada
- K24FH-D in Glide, etc., Oregon
- K24FL-D in Columbus, Montana
- K24FU-D in Pleasant Valley, Colorado, on virtual channel 51, which rebroadcasts K16NJ-D
- K24GD-D in Hardin, Montana
- K24GE-D in Wells, Nevada
- K24GO-D in Blair, Nebraska
- K24GT-D in Kemmerer, Wyoming
- K24GY-D in Ely, Nevada
- K24HG-D in Cozad, Nebraska
- K24HH-D in Wichita Falls, Texas
- K24HP-D in Price, etc., Utah
- K24HQ-D in Boulder, Colorado, on virtual channel 6, which rebroadcasts KRMA-TV
- K24HU-D in Burley, etc., Idaho
- K24IB-D in Verdi/Mogul, Nevada
- K24ID-D in Ferndale, Montana
- K24IM-D in Keosauqua, Iowa
- K24IN-D in Green River, Utah
- K24IP-D in Huntington, Utah
- K24IT-D in Hoquiam, Washington, on virtual channel 5, which rebroadcasts K05RG-D
- K24IV-D in Farmington, New Mexico
- K24IX-D in Turkey, Texas
- K24IY-D in Raton, New Mexico
- K24JE-D in Sunriver, Oregon
- K24JG-D in Norfolk, Nebraska
- K24JL-D in Beowowe, Nevada
- K24JN-D in Lewiston, Idaho
- K24JO-D in Crawford, Colorado
- K24JV-D in St. James, Minnesota
- K24KG-D in Madras, Oregon
- K24KJ-D in Libby, Montana
- K24KM-D in Colstrip, etc., Montana
- K24KR-D in Jacks Cabin, Colorado, on virtual channel 2, which rebroadcasts K09TH-D
- K24KS-D in Flagstaff, Arizona, on virtual channel 15, which rebroadcasts KNXV-TV
- K24KT-D in Walker, Minnesota, on virtual channel 24, which rebroadcasts KARE
- K24KU-D in Chinook, Montana
- K24KV-D in Logan, Utah, on virtual channel 24
- K24KX-D in Cedarville, California
- K24LM-D in Bridgeport, Washington
- K24LQ-D in Collbran, Colorado
- K24LS-D in Lucerne Valley, California, on virtual channel 24
- K24LX-D in Orderville, Utah
- K24LY-D in Cottage Grove, Oregon
- K24MB-D in Hobbs, New Mexico
- K24MC-D in Baker Valley, Oregon
- K24MD-D in Sayre, Oklahoma
- K24ME-D in Milton-Freewater, Oregon
- K24MF-D in Florence, Oregon
- K24MH-D in Powers, Oregon
- K24MI-D in Redding, California
- K24MJ-D in Shoshoni, Wyoming
- K24MK-D in Glenrock, Wyoming
- K24ML-D in Taos, New Mexico
- K24MM-D in Red Lake, Minnesota
- K24MN-D in Phillips County, Montana
- K24MO-D in Tyler, Texas
- K24MP-D in Butte, Montana
- K24MQ-D in Marysvale, Utah
- K24MS-D in Roseau, Minnesota
- K24MT-D in International Falls, Minnesota
- K24MU-D in Summit County, Utah
- K24MV-D in Fort Peck, Montana
- K24MW-D in Clovis, New Mexico
- K24MX-D in Deming, New Mexico
- K24MY-D in Kanarraville, Utah
- K24MZ-D in Fillmore, etc., Utah
- K24NA-D in Delta, Utah
- K24NB-D in Elko, Nevada
- K24NC-D in Roosevelt, Utah, on virtual channel 14, which rebroadcasts KJZZ-TV
- K24ND-D in Orangeville, Utah, on virtual channel 30, which rebroadcasts KUCW
- K24NE-D in Overton, Nevada
- K24NF-D in Tucumcari, New Mexico
- K24NG-D in Lake Havasu City, Arizona
- K24NH-D in Durango, Colorado
- K24NI-D in Yuma, Arizona
- K24NK-D in Memphis, Texas
- K24NM-D in Sargents, Colorado
- K24NO-D in Bonners Ferry, Idaho
- K24NQ-D in Golconda, Nevada
- K24NR-D in Amarillo, Texas
- K24NS-D in Stateline, Nevada
- K24NZ-D in Carbondale, Colorado
- K24OE-D in Jackson, Wyoming
- K24OJ-D in Uvalde, Texas
- K24ON-D in Ridgecrest, California
- KAAP-LD in Santa Cruz, California, on virtual channel 24
- KAGW-CD in Wichita, Kansas
- KATU in Portland, Oregon, on virtual channel 2
- KBID-LP in Fresno, California
- KBIT-LD in Monterey, California
- KBNT-CD in San Diego, California, on virtual channel 17
- KCCX-LD in Corpus Christi, Texas
- KCSD-TV in Sioux Falls, South Dakota
- KCTV in Kansas City, Missouri, on virtual channel 5
- KCWL-LD in Monroe, Louisiana
- KDSO-LD in Medford, Oregon
- KEGS-LD in Las Vegas, Nevada
- KEGW-CD in Siloam Springs, Arkansas
- KEOO-LD in Midland, Texas
- KETH-TV in Houston, Texas, on virtual channel 14
- KFAM-CD in Lake Charles, Louisiana
- KFSM-TV in Van Buren, Arkansas
- KGMV in Wailuku, Hawaii
- KIAT-LD in Jonesboro, Arkansas
- KILM in Inglewood, California, uses KPXN-TV's spectrum, on virtual channel 64
- KIMT in Mason City, Iowa
- KIVI-TV in Nampa, Idaho
- KKFX-CD in San Luis Obispo, California
- KKTF-LD in Chico, California
- KMAX-TV in Sacramento, California, on virtual channel 31
- KMLN-LD in Fort Collins, Colorado, on virtual channel 23, which rebroadcasts KDEO-LD
- KMOV in St. Louis, Missouri, on virtual channel 4
- KNAT-TV in Albuquerque, New Mexico
- KNDM in Minot, North Dakota
- KOKH-TV in Oklahoma City, Oklahoma
- KPMF-LD in Paragould, Arkansas
- KPNZ in Ogden, Utah, on virtual channel 24
- KPXN-TV in San Bernardino, California, on virtual channel 30
- KQUP in Pullman, Washington
- KRDK-TV in Fargo/Valley City, North Dakota (as of 6/25/20)
- KRDO-TV in Colorado Springs, Colorado
- KRLJ-LD in Joplin, Missouri
- KRPG-LD in Des Moines, Iowa
- KSAX in Alexandria, Minnesota, on virtual channel 42
- KSNB-TV in York, Nebraska
- KTTA-LD in Monroe, Utah, on virtual channel 8
- KTUL in McAlester, Oklahoma
- KTVK in Phoenix, Arizona, on virtual channel 3
- KTXU-LD in West Lake Hills, Texas
- KUNS-TV in Bellevue, Washington, an ATSC 3.0 station, on virtual channel 51
- KVEO-TV in Brownsville, Texas
- KVTN-DT in Pine Bluff, Arkansas
- KWEX-DT in San Antonio, Texas
- KXAS-TV in Fort Worth, Texas, on virtual channel 5
- KXIP-LD in Paris, Texas
- KXTQ-CD in Lubbock, Texas
- KYCW-LD in Branson, Missouri
- KZLL-LD in Joplin, Missouri
- W24CL-D in Grantsburg, Wisconsin, on virtual channel 28, which rebroadcasts WHWC-TV
- W24CS-D in Reading, Pennsylvania, on virtual channel 69, which rebroadcasts WFMZ-AB
- W24DB-D in Clarks Summit, Pennsylvania
- W24DL-D in Saginaw, Michigan
- W24EC-D in Manteo, North Carolina
- W24ER-D in Clarksburg, West Virginia
- W24ES-D in Moorefield, West Virginia
- W24ET-D in Atlantic City, New Jersey
- W24EU-D in Erie, Pennsylvania
- W24EX-D in Florence, South Carolina
- W24EZ-D in Allingtown, Connecticut (switched to channel 16 and switched call letters to WETN-LD in 2024).
- W24FB-D in Brazil, Indiana
- W24FC-D in Augusta, Georgia
- W39CA-D in Fulton, Mississippi
- WAMI-DT in Hollywood, Florida, on virtual channel 69
- WCML in Alpena, Michigan
- WCNC-TV in Charlotte, North Carolina, on virtual channel 36
- WDCO-CD in Woodstock, Virginia, on virtual channel 10
- WDDA-LD in Chattanooga, Tennessee
- WDEM-CD in Columbus, Ohio, on virtual channel 17
- WDLH-LD in Evansville, Indiana
- WDMW-LD in Milwaukee, Wisconsin
- WDPB in Seaford, Delaware
- WDSC-TV in New Smyrna Beach, Florida, on virtual channel 15
- WDWL in Bayamon, Puerto Rico, uses WUJA's spectrum, on virtual channel 36
- WEAO in Akron, Ohio, on virtual channel 49
- WETP-TV in Sneedville, Tennessee
- WFLD in Chicago, Illinois, on virtual channel 32
- WFMZ-AB in Allentown, Pennsylvania, on virtual channel 69, which rebroadcasts WFMZ-TV and WDPN-TV
- WGMB-TV in Baton Rouge, Louisiana
- WGTA in Toccoa, Georgia, on virtual channel 32
- WHIQ in Huntsville, Alabama
- WHOI in Peoria, Illinois
- WHRM-TV in Wausau, Wisconsin
- WHSV-TV (DRT) in Winchester, Virginia, on virtual channel 3
- WHTX-LD in Springfield, Massachusetts
- WIPL in Lewiston, Maine
- WITV in Charleston, South Carolina
- WJTS-CD in Jasper, Indiana
- WKON in Owenton, Kentucky
- WKSY-LD in Rome, Georgia
- WLNE-TV in New Bedford, Massachusetts
- WLWD-LD in Dayton, Ohio
- WMDN in Meridian, Mississippi
- WNKY in Bowling Green, Kentucky
- WNPX-LD in Nashville, Tennessee
- WNYE-TV in New York, New York, on virtual channel 25
- WONO-CD in Syracuse, etc., New York
- WPDN-LD in Pittsburgh, Pennsylvania, on virtual channel 65
- WPHA-CD in Philadelphia, Pennsylvania, on virtual channel 24.
- WPTA in Fort Wayne, Indiana
- WPWR-TV in Gary, Indiana, uses WFLD's spectrum, on virtual channel 50
- WPXC-TV in Brunswick, Georgia
- WPXD-TV in Ann Arbor, Michigan, on virtual channel 31
- WPXI (DRT) in Uniontown, Pennsylvania, on virtual channel 11
- WPXJ-TV in Batavia, New York
- WQQZ-CD in Ponce, Puerto Rico, on virtual channel 14, which rebroadcasts WOST
- WRLH-TV in Richmond, Virginia
- WRLM in Canton, Ohio, uses WEAO's spectrum, on virtual channel 47
- WSRE in Pensacola, Florida
- WTAJ-TV in Altoona, Pennsylvania
- WTBM-CD in Birmingham, Alabama
- WTEN in Albany, New York
- WTLF in Tallahassee, Florida
- WTLJ in Muskegon, Michigan
- WUBX-CD in Durham, etc., North Carolina, on virtual channel 31
- WUDZ-LD in Indianapolis, Indiana, on virtual channel 28
- WUJA in Caguas, Puerto Rico, on virtual channel 58
- WUWT-CD in Union City, Tennessee
- WVAH-TV in Charleston, West Virginia
- WVNC-LD in Watertown, New York
- WVND-LD in Suwanee, Georgia, on virtual channel 31
- WWAY in Wilmington, North Carolina
- WWDD-LD in Baltimore, Maryland
- WWEO-LD in Defuniak Springs, Florida
- WWSB in Sarasota, Florida, on virtual channel 40
- WXTX in Columbus, Georgia
- WYKE-CD in Inglis/Yankeetown, Florida
- WZCK-LD in Madison, Wisconsin

The following stations, which are no longer licensed, formerly broadcast on digital channel 24:

- K24CS-D in Granite Falls, Minnesota
- K24DA-D in Big Piney, etc., Wyoming
- K24IQ-D in Billings, Montana
- K24JI-D in Hermiston, Oregon
- K24JR-D in Orr, Minnesota
- K24KD-D in Salix, Iowa
- K24NL-D in Weed, California
- K24NN-D in Twin Falls, Idaho
- KIJK-LD in Lincoln, Nebraska
- KQFW-LD in Dallas, Texas
- KRUB-LD in Cedar Rapids, Iowa
- KXLJ-LD in Juneau, Alaska
- KZSA-LD in San Angelo, Texas
- W24BB-D in East Stroudsburg, Pennsylvania
- W24DE-D in Miami, Florida
- W24DM-D in Gainesville, Florida
- W24DN-D in Clarksburg, West Virginia
- WLNN-CD in Boone, North Carolina
- WUEB-LD in Rockford, Illinois
