= WQML =

WQML may refer to:

- WQML (FM), a radio station (101.5 FM) licensed to serve Ceiba, Puerto Rico
- WNVE (FM), a radio station (98.7 FM) licensed to serve Culebra, Puerto Rico, which held the call sign WQML from 2009 to 2013 and from 2014 to 2018
