= WBRQ =

WBRQ may refer to:

- WBRQ (FM), a defunct radio station (91.9 FM) formerly licensed to serve La Grange, Georgia, United States
- WNVM, a radio station (97.7 FM) licensed to serve Cidra, Puerto Rico, which held the call sign WBRQ from 1972 to 2009
