= WNVE =

WNVE may refer to:

- WNVE (FM), a radio station (98.7 FM) licensed to serve Culebra, Puerto Rico
- WQML (FM), a radio station (101.5 FM) licensed to serve Ceiba, Puerto Rico, which held the call sign WNVE from 2014 to 2018
- WAIO, a radio station (95.1 FM) licensed to serve Honeoye Falls, New York, United States, which held the call sign WNVE from 1995 to 2004
