= JBR =

JBR may refer to:

== People ==
- JonBenét Ramsey (1990–1996), American murdered child
- Jung Bahadur Rana (1817–1877), Nepalese prime minister
- Other prime ministers of the Rana dynasty

== Places ==
- Jumeirah Beach Residence, a waterfront community in Dubai, UAE
- Jonesboro Municipal Airport, Arkansas (IATA:JBR)

== Other uses ==
- JetBrains Runtime, an OpenJDK flavor
- "Jingle Bell Rock", a 1957 Christmas song by Bobby Helms
