= The Mall at Turtle Creek =

Destroyed mall in Jonesboro, Arkansas, U.S.

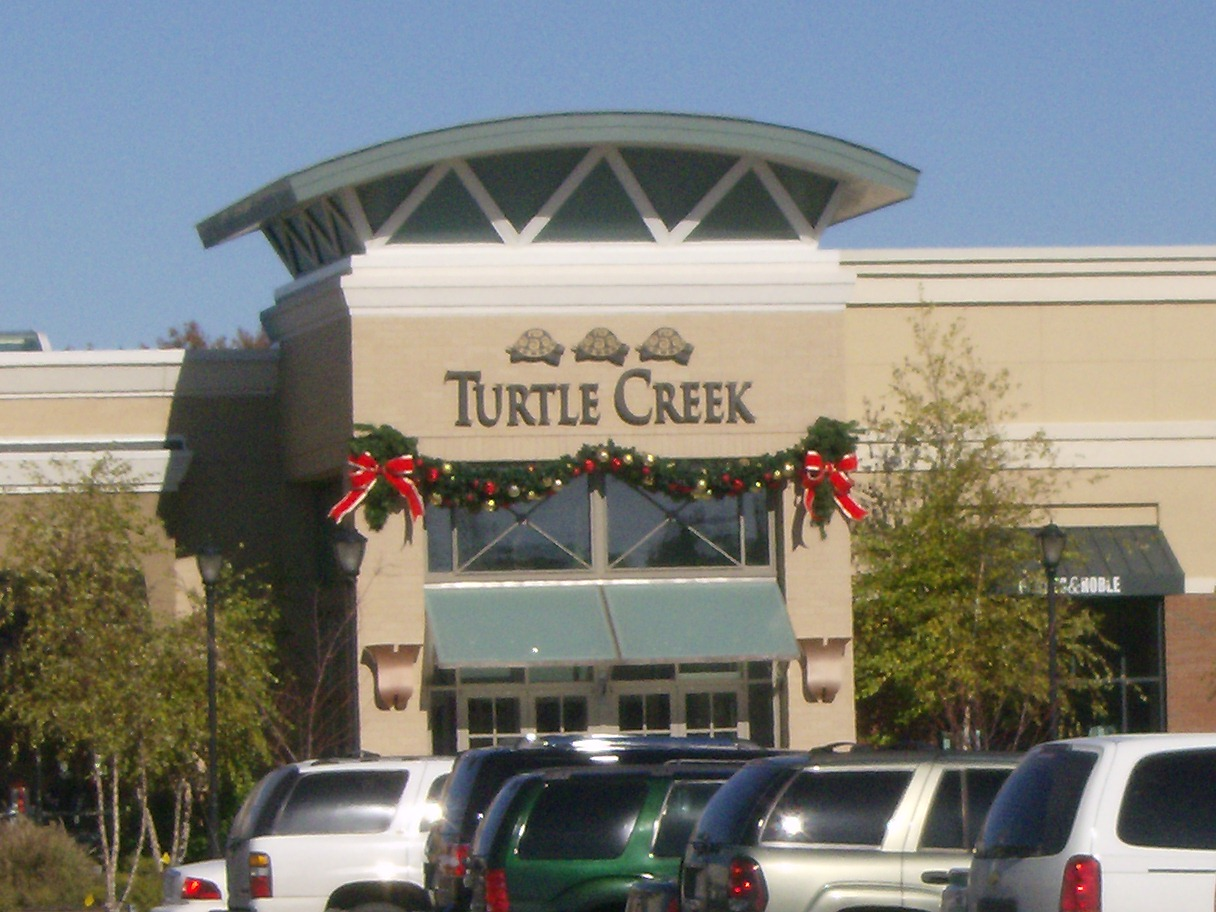
- Main entrance (November 2007)
- Location: Jonesboro, Arkansas, United States
- Coordinates: 35.8234°N 90.6640°W
- Address: 3000 East Highland Drive
- Opened: March 29, 2006; 20 years ago
- Closed: March 29, 2020; 6 years ago
- Developer: David Hocker & Associates; MBC Holdings
- Manager: Haag Brown
- Owner: Haag Brown
- Architect: CMH Architects, Inc.
- Num. of stores: Before tornado: 100+; After tornado: None
- Num. of anchor tenants: 3
- Floor area: Before tornado: 750,000 square feet (69,677.3 m^{2}); After tornado: 360,000 square feet (33,445.1 m^{2})
- Floors: 1 (2 in Dillard's)
- Parking: Parking lot with 5,000 free spaces
- Public transit: JETS bus routes: Blue, Gold, Red, Green
- Website: mallatturtlecreek.com (2019 archive)

The Mall at Turtle Creek was an enclosed shopping mall in Jonesboro, Arkansas, that closed in 2020 due to the 2020 Jonesboro tornado. As of September 2020, the only stores in operation at the property are JCPenney, Dillard's and Target.

== Overview ==
The mall was rectangular and stretched over a 73-acre (300,000 m^{2}) plot. The developers wanted to give the mall a "Main Street" look, with 100 stores arranged along two sides of the mall facing each other, a pedestrian walkway on each side, and various vendors occupying the mid-aisles. The mall was constructed with Dillard's anchoring the east end of the mall, Target anchoring the west end of the mall, and JCPenney anchoring the southwest end of the mall. Along with the three main anchors, the mall included three junior anchors: Best Buy, Barnes & Noble, and Bed Bath & Beyond, all along the southeast end. Before the tornado, The Mall at Turtle Creek had a gross area of 750,000 sq ft (70,000 m^{2}) and was the fifth largest mall in Arkansas. With only the three anchors standing after the tornado damage, the remaining total retail floor area is 364,199 square feet.

== History ==
Construction of The Mall at Turtle Creek began in September 2004. Target and JCPenney opened their stores in late 2005, and Dillard's opened its store early in 2006. The rest of the mall held its grand opening in March 2006 and was the only enclosed mall to open in the country that year.

Rouse Properties purchased the mall from its original owners, Turtle Creek Partners, LLC, which was composed of Owensboro, Kentucky-based developer David E. Hocker, Memphis-based developer Martin Belz, and Jonesboro, Arkansas-based developer Bruce Burrow, in February 2013. In July 2016, Brookfield Asset Management acquired Rouse Properties and its portfolio, including The Mall at Turtle Creek.

Rouse Properties was then absorbed into Brookfield Properties in August 2018 following Brookfield's acquisition of Rouse Properties' then parent company, General Growth Properties.

=== 2020 tornado ===
At approximately 5:00 p.m. CDT on March 28, 2020, an EF3 tornado swept through the east side of Jonesboro, impacting the mall, Jonesboro Municipal Airport, and nearby commercial and residential areas. The tornado was categorized as an EF2 when it struck the mall, causing significant damage to the main entrance and most of its retail stores. In the preceding days, the mall had been temporarily closed due to COVID-19 pandemic restrictions and was nearly empty of customers. The tornado caused 22 injuries in Jonesboro and resulted in no fatalities. Dillard's, JCPenney, and Target have since reopened. On September 4, 2020, it was announced that Barnes & Noble would not reopen.

=== Fate of the mall ===
After the 2020 tornado damaged The Mall at Turtle Creek, the only stores that reopened were JCPenney, Target, and Dillard's. Ten months after the tornado, the city of Jonesboro issued a 30-day notice to mall owner Brookfield Properties, ordering the property to be cleaned up. Three months after the notice, the cleanup process began. As of 2022, two years after the tornado, the mall has yet to be rebuilt and resembles a construction site. Jonesboro Mayor Harold Copenhaver stated he has encouraged Brookfield Properties to rebuild the mall, but stated the city has limited options because Brookfield Properties is a private organization. According to KAIT8, Brookfield Properties had no comment on the mall, nor its future. In 2023, Syracuse, New York-based Spinoso Real Estate Group was assigned as a third-party to manage the property.

=== Redevelopment ===
In September 2025, local investor Haag Brown Commercial Development & Real Estate acquired the site for $4.85 million.

Haag Brown announced that a 96,000-square-foot open-air power center would be constructed on the former mall site.

As part of this plan, Brown is actively recruiting national retailers, including some who were previous tenants of the mall before it was destroyed by the tornado. Construction on the new facility is anticipated to begin in 2026.

== See also ==
- Indian Mall
