= 2020 Jonesboro tornado =

2020 tornado in Arkansas, U.S.

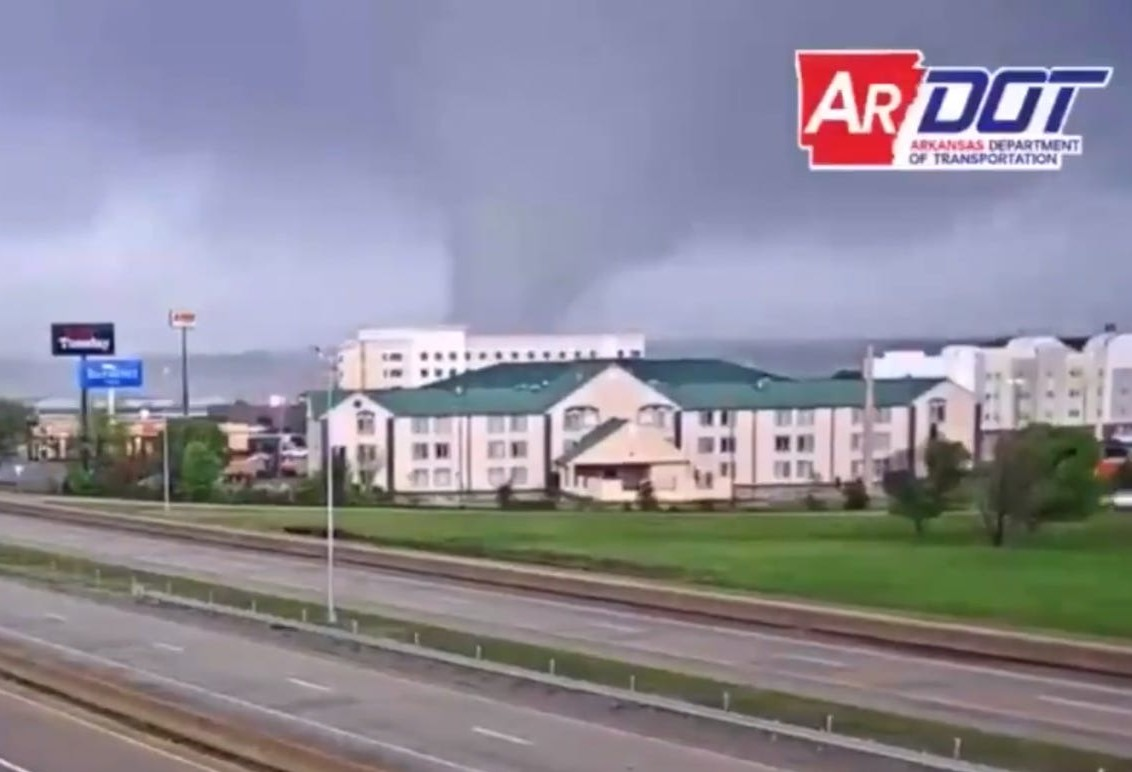
- Top: A traffic camera still of the tornado shortly after forming in Jonesboro Bottom: The tornado crossing a parking lot in Jonesboro

Meteorological history
- Formed: March 28, 2020, 4:58 p.m. CDT (UTC−05:00)
- Dissipated: March 28, 2020, 5:14 p.m. CDT (UTC−05:00)
- Duration: 16 minutes

EF3 tornado
- on the Enhanced Fujita scale
- Path length: 12.55 miles (20.20 km)
- Highest winds: 150 mph (240 km/h)

Overall effects
- Fatalities: 0
- Injuries: 22
- Economic losses: $300 million (2020 USD)
- Areas affected: Jonesboro and areas east of Brookland, Arkansas, US
- Part of the Tornadoes of 2020

On the afternoon of March 28, 2020, a large and intense tornado moved through Craighead County, Arkansas, United States, striking the eastern portions of Jonesboro. The tornado, which was on the ground for 16 minutes and tracked for 12.55 miles (20.20 km), injured 22 people and damaged an estimated 300 buildings. The tornado, rated EF3 on the Enhanced Fujita scale, heavily damaged planes and hangars at the Jonesboro Municipal Airport and damaged The Mall at Turtle Creek beyond repair. The tornado was captured widely on video, being seen on traffic cameras and tower cameras that were shown to the public during live coverage of the event.

The tornado first touched down at 4:58 pm Central Daylight Time (CDT) reaching EF2 intensity as it impacted a retail area. The tornado continued to strengthen as it neared The Mall at Turtle Creek, which sustained heavy damage. To the northeast, the tornado reached EF3 intensity at it directly impacted the Jonesboro Municipal Airport, where hangars were destroyed and a Beechcraft King Air 200 was blown down the airport's runway. At a railroad located to the northeast, 112 railcars were blown off. The tornado slightly wavered in intensity at this location. Continuing to track to the northeast, it again reached EF3 intensity as it struck a subdivision of homes. Wind speeds as the tornado struck the homes were estimated to have been as high as 150 miles per hour (240 km/h). The tornado then began to consistently weaken, dissipating 16 minutes after touching down.

== Advanced forecasting ==
On March 25, meteorologists working for the Storm Prediction Center (SPC) outlined a "slight", level 2-out-of-5 risk of severe weather in northern Oklahoma, western Missouri, southeastern Kansas and a small portion of Arkansas. The following day, on March 26, the SPC moved the slight risk slightly northward, putting northern Arkansas in a "marginal", level 1-out-of-5 risk but moving it out of the slight risk area. The SPC also outlined a 5% risk of tornadoes for northern Oklahoma and southern Kansas, while a 2% risk of tornadoes existed from central Oklahoma to central Missouri. The Day 3 convective outlook outlined on March 26 showed southeastern Arkansas in a slight risk area, although Jonesboro remained in a marginal risk.

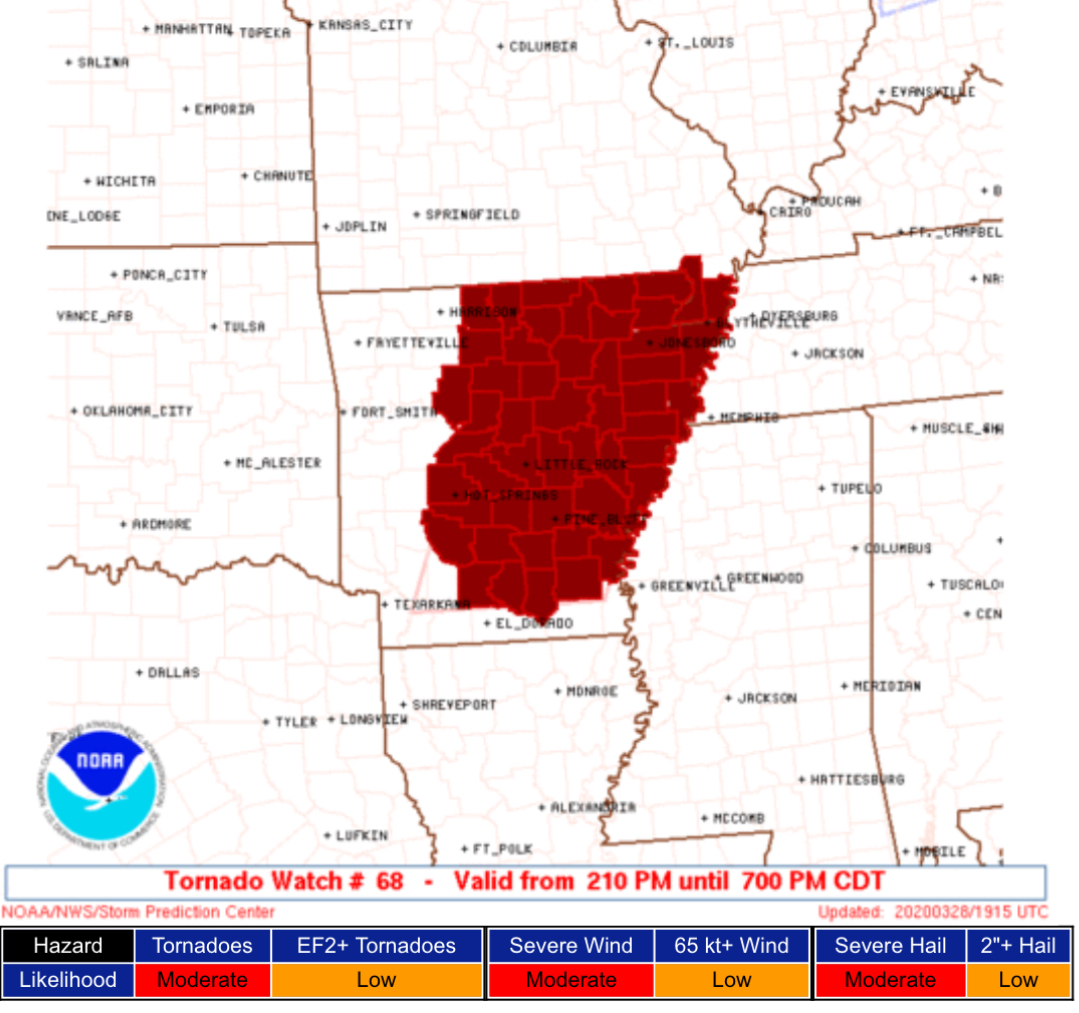
Tornado Watch #68, which covered much of Arkansas, preceded the tornado

The Day 1 convective outlook on March 28 saw the majority of Arkansas put in a slight risk area, with the SPC outlining a 5% chance of tornadoes in northeastern Arkansas. In addition, 15% risks were introduced for both hail and wind, covering much of Arkansas in conjunction with the slight risk area. To the north, a "moderate", level 4-out-of-5 risk was outlined for Central Illinois and extreme eastern Iowa, which was driven by a 15% risk of tornadoes within 25 miles of a given point, commonly known as a "hatched area".

In a 20:00 UTC update convective outlook on March 28, Arkansas was introduced to an expansion of the initial 5% tornado risk, which now covered the eastern half of the state. An "enhanced", level 3-out-of-5 risk was outlined for the Missouri Bootheel and small portions of northern Arkansas. A 30% risk for damaging winds was also expanded southward, stretching into northern Arkansas.

Later on March 28, Tornado Watch #68 was issued for much of Arkansas. The tornado watch outlined a moderate risk of tornadoes, but a low risk of EF2+ tornadoes.

== Tornado summary ==
The tornado first touched down just east of McClellan Drive at 4:58 pm CDT, moving to the northeast. The tornado initially produced EF0-consistent damage before reaching EF1 intensity on Spencer Circle. EF2 intensity was reached as the tornado impacted the intersection of Race Street and South Caraway Road. At 2801 South Caroway Road, a video showed the tornado impacting and destroying the Gateway Tire and Service Center; a damage study by engineers Timothy P. Marshall and Garry Woodall noted the building was "blown apart" and pieces of the building struck power lines, causing power flashes. On the southern edge of the tornado's path, a building suffered a wall failure. To the north, a large steel building suffered a progressive structural collapse as it was directly by the tornado, which at the time maintained wind speeds as high as 131 miles per hour (211 km/h). The tornado wavered in strength as it crossed over Stone Street, producing EF1 damage to an office building. A post office in the area lost its roof, and several retail outlets were damaged by the tornado.

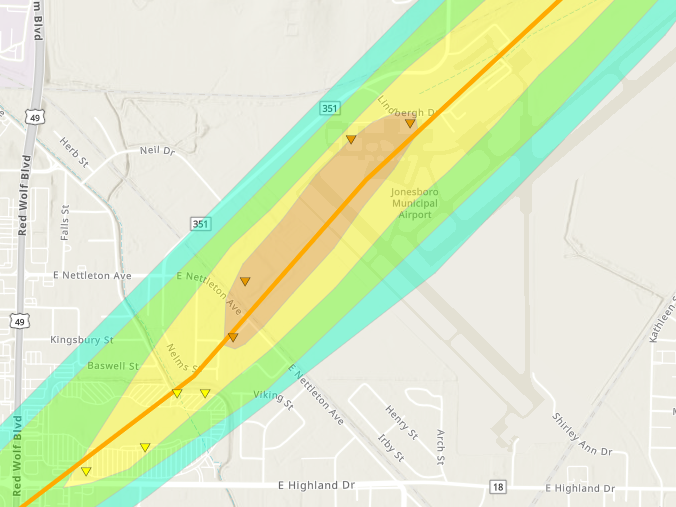
Track and intensity map of the tornado through the Jonesboro Municipal Airport. Key EF0 65–85 mph EF1 86–110 mph EF2 111–135 mph EF3 136–165 mph ⎯ Center of the tornado

The tornado re-intensified as it crossed East Highland Drive, reaching EF3 intensity above a subdivision of homes and destroying at least one home southwest of the Jonesboro Municipal Airport. The tornado then entered The Mall at Turtle Creek, heavily damaging the building and collapsing several walls in varying directions. The mall flooded following the tornado.

The tornado maintained 148-mile-per-hour (238 km/h) wind speeds as it drew closer to the airport, where another steel building collapsed under the tornadic winds. On the grounds of the Jonesboro Municipal Airport, the tornado inflicted EF3 damage to steel buildings and hangars north of the tarmac; at least one plane was overturned. The Aircraft Owners and Pilots Association noted that 50 aircraft were damaged at the airport and that a Beechcraft King Air 200 was blown down the runway by the tornado. A maintenance hangar owned by Fly Jonesboro was also destroyed. It weakened to EF2 intensity on Lindbergh Drive before entering a large neighborhood of homes on and to the north of Yukon Drive. At least one home was damaged at EF2 intensity on Wildwood Point. To the north of the airport, the tornado derailed 112 railcars off of a railroad.

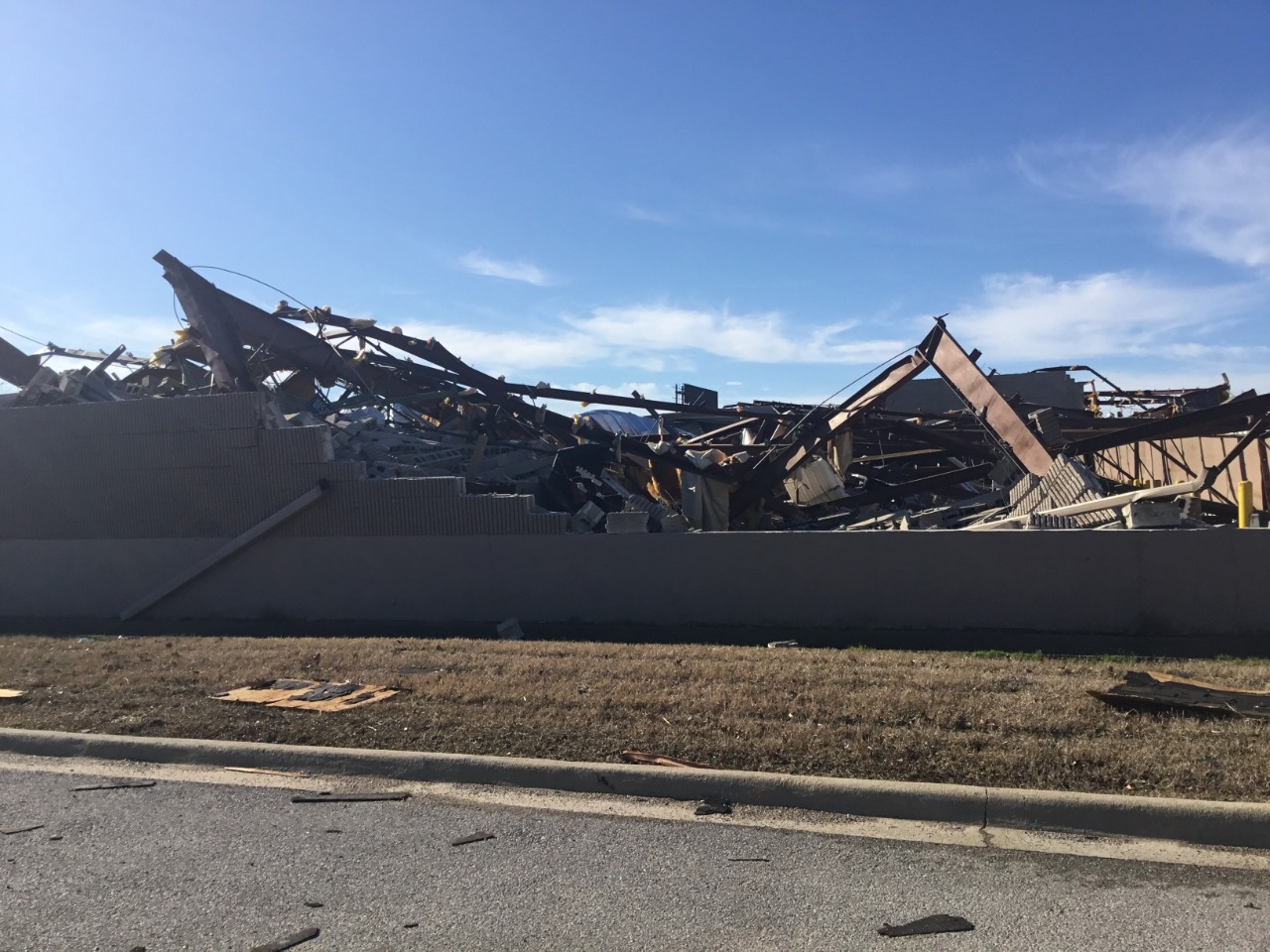
The collapsed Gateway Tire and Service on South Caroway Road in Jonesboro

On Wildwood Lane, the tornado again reached EF3 intensity, inflicting EF3-rated damage to homes. The tornado maintained this intensity while tracking over Tiffany Lane and over Prospect Road, where a home was destroyed at EF3 intensity; the tornado had estimated wind speeds of 145 miles per hour (233 km/h) at this location. The tornado then crossed Elizabeth Lane, before impacting a few homes on Nathan Drive. On the corner of Nathan Drive and Tawn Drive, at least one home was completely destroyed at EF3 intensity.

The tornado weakened after crossing Troy Cove, where EF2 damage was inflicted to a home. The tornado then crossed the Murray Creek and impacted Smithfield Drive, where it entered another subdivision of homes. On Slimbridge Drive and Laura Lea Drive, at least three homes were deroofed at EF2 intensity. The tornado continued to weaken, dropping to EF1 intensity as it tracked over a field south of Darrick Circle, before re-reaching EF2 intensity as it impacted and tracked parallel to U.S. Route 49 and East Johnson Avenue. A small building located off the highway partially collapsed in wind speeds estimated to have been as high as 135 miles per hour (217 km/h). Further to the northeast, a steel building was heavily damaged at EF2 intensity.

Traffic camera video of the tornado in Jonesboro

A short distance northeast, the tornado weakened to EF1 intensity, moving to the east and clipping Jonesboro Junction. A home located on County Road 928 received EF1 damage, being directly impacted by the tornado. The tornado began to track through less-populated areas near the end of its life, only striking a subdivision of homes on Eason Street and Dooley Street. The tornado crossed the three-way intersection of County Road 933 and County Road 938 and later County Roads 936 and 939 while beginning to become thinner. Shortly after tracking over Arkansas Highway 230 the tornado weakened to EF0 intensity before dissipating east of Aetna in Craighead County at 5:14 pm CDT.

The tornado was on the ground for 12.55 miles (20.20 km), reaching a maximum width of 600 yards (550 m). The tornado injured 22 people and received an EF3 rating by the National Weather Service (NWS), with maximum wind speeds estimated to have been approximately 150 miles per hour (240 km/h). News channel KAIT broadcast live video of the tornado, helping warn the public in advance.

== Aftermath ==
=== Damage and casualties ===
The tornado damaged or destroyed many buildings in and around Jonesboro. The tornado caused monetary damage that totaled an estimated $300 million (2020 USD). In addition to structural and monetary figures, 22 people were injured in the tornado. The lack of fatalities was attributed to the COVID-19 pandemic in Arkansas, which led to public spaces being less crowded than usual and residents already being in their homes. Two of the injured stayed in the hospital overnight, but nobody sustained life-threatening injuries.

=== Warnings ===
The NWS was praised on social media platform X (at the time called Twitter) for its advanced warnings of the event, including a tornado warning that was issued ten minutes before the tornado actually touched down. In addition to advanced warnings, the tornado was covered live on television and warnings were transmitted via the NOAA Weather Radio outlet, which according to Midland Radio "undoubtedly saved lives".

=== Damage survey ===
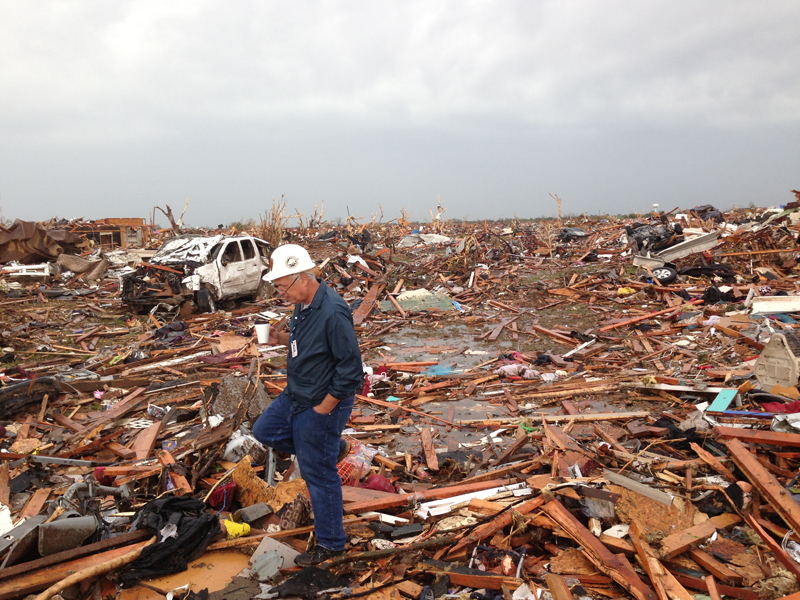
Timothy P. Marshall (seen in 2013) conducted an in-depth survey of buildings damaged by the tornado

In November 2022, structural engineers Timothy P. Marshall and Gary Woodall for the Haag Engineering Company conducted a detailed damage survey on the tornado. The survey, titled "Damage survey of the Jonesboro, Arkansas tornado: March 28, 2020" noted that cleanup efforts began immediately after the tornado, which made surveying of tornado damage difficult. The survey used Google Street View and other historical imagery to compare the damaged buildings to their pre-tornado state.

One of the buildings surveyed was Cheddar's Scratch Kitchen, which was directly impacted by the tornado. The building was wood and steel-framed with large windows extending along the building's northern side. The windows blew inward during the tornado, compromising the interior of the structure and lifting up the roof. The survey determined that wind speeds at this location reached 110 miles per hour (180 km/h), which corresponds to an upper-end EF1 rating.

In October 2021, Cheddar's Scratch Kitchen was reopened to the public after being rebuilt; 25 of the original employees returned to work at the restaurant.

=== Recovery efforts ===
The tornado was described by Weather Underground as "the first U.S. weather disaster of the coronavirus-shutdown era". Rick Crawford, state representative for the area, stated that “in the midst of this response, maintaining the appropriate posture with regard to COVID-19 is going to be an added challenge”; the pandemic was affecting Arkansas at the time of the tornado. The City of Jonesboro ordered a 7 pm curfew.

Heart to Heart International and other humanitarian groups like the International Red Cross and Red Crescent Movement helped with recovery efforts in Jonesboro, as well as first responders and emergency personnel from the region. Bay, Arkansas Police Chief Paul Keith stated that “After the tornado passed, [the area] was inundated with first responders from all over". StormPoint, a non-profit group, flew a drone to survey and capture imagery of the tornado's damage path, which was conducted to aid the Jonesboro Police Department.

== Other tornadoes ==
Several weaker tornadoes were associated with the storm system that produced the Jonesboro tornado.

List of confirmed tornadoes – Saturday, March 28, 2020 (Note: All dates are based on the local time zone where the tornado touched down; however, all times are in Coordinated Universal Time for consistency.)
EF#	Location	County / Parish	State	Start Coord.	Time (UTC)	Path length	Max width	Summary
EF1	NE of Carl to S of Fontanelle	Adams, Adair	Iowa	41.1507°N 94.6368°W	18:59–19:15	7.47 mi (12.02 km)	115 yd (105 m)	A tornado damaged an outbuilding, with the rest of the path being over open land.
EF1	SE of Amagon	Jackson	Arkansas	35.5072°N 91.1184°W	21:18–21:24	5.33 mi (8.58 km)	200 yd (180 m)	Multiple metal buildings and tractor sheds were damaged or destroyed, and some homes were damaged in and around the small community of Algoa. Farm equipment, outbuildings, and more homes were damaged further along the path, and a few semi-trailers were overturned or rolled. Some trees were uprooted, and power poles were snapped as well.
EF0	SSW of Rhodes	Marshall	Iowa	41.8819°N 93.206°W	21:26–21:28	1.3 mi (2.1 km)	75 yd (69 m)	A tornado moved through rural farmland, causing minor damage to a few groves of trees.
EF1	E of Paragould	Greene	Arkansas	36.05°N 90.3808°W	22:25–22:30	2.97 mi (4.78 km)	100 yd (91 m)	An industrial building, a grain bin, a mobile home, and several storage buildings were damaged. A center pivot irrigation system was overturned, and numerous trees were downed.
EFU	SW of Oneida	Knox	Illinois	41.0624°N 90.238°W	22:39–22:40	0.12 mi (0.19 km)	10 yd (9.1 m)	A brief tornado touched down in a field just southwest of Oneida with no damage reported.
EFU	S of Hudson	Black Hawk	Iowa	42.3136°N 92.4686°W	22:39–22:42	2.32 mi (3.73 km)	40 yd (37 m)	A tornado in a rural area passed very close to a house, but did no damage.
EF0	ENE of Hudson to S of Waterloo	Black Hawk	Iowa	42.4201°N 92.3874°W	22:49–22:51	2.06 mi (3.32 km)	115 yd (105 m)	A tornado removed the roof of a barn and destroyed a garage. Other buildings and trees were also damaged.
EFU	NW of Evandale	Black Hawk	Iowa	42.4725°N 92.3138°W	22:55–22:56	0.32 mi (0.51 km)	20 yd (18 m)	A tornado occurred in an unpopulated near the Waterloo Waste Water Treatment Plant along the Cedar River. While tree damage may have occurred, no damage was reported.
EF1	NNW of Jesup to SE of Fairbank	Buchanan	Iowa	42.5086°N 92.0809°W	23:15–23:25	7.38 mi (11.88 km)	50 yd (46 m)	A tornado moved north-northeast passing through Littleton. There was damage to outbuildings and a barn while also uprooting trees at a farmstead.
EF1	Western Oelwein	Fayette	Iowa	42.648°N 91.9414°W	23:30–23:36	3.93 mi (6.32 km)	140 yd (130 m)	A rain-wrapped tornado damaged apartment buildings and trees on the west side of Oelwein. One person was indirectly injured after stepping on broken glass after the tornado dissipated.
EF0	E of Maynard	Fayette	Iowa	42.7525°N 91.8552°W	23:40–23:43	3.6 mi (5.8 km)	50 yd (46 m)	A weak tornado caused minor damage at several farms.
EFU	ESE of Andover to ENE of Cambridge	Henry	Illinois	41.28°N 90.24°W	00:43–00:44	1.07 mi (1.72 km)	10 yd (9.1 m)	A brief tornado was photographed but did no observable damage.
EF2	Corydon to W of Spottsville	Henderson	Kentucky	37.7418°N 87.7038°W	00:58–01:12	16.79 mi (27.02 km)	500 yd (460 m)	This low-end EF2 tornado downed trees in Corydon before moving through the southern fringes of Henderson. Dozens of homes sustained roof, siding, fascia, and soffit damage, and over a dozen barns and outbuildings sustained roof or structural damage. One large, well-built barn was completely destroyed with the debris scattered across a field. Hundreds of trees were either snapped or uprooted along the path, and several power poles were snapped as well.
EF1	SE of Ipava	Fulton	Illinois	40.3361°N 90.319°W	01:01–01:04	2.06 mi (3.32 km)	100 yd (91 m)	A barn, gazebo, the front porch of a house, outbuildings, and several roofs were damaged.
EF2	Newburgh	Henderson (Kentucky), Warrick (Indiana)	Kentucky, Indiana	37.9372°N 87.4181°W	01:18–01:25	5.06 mi (8.14 km)	575 yd (526 m)	Five homes in town sustained partial to total roof loss, one of which had a few top floor exterior walls ripped off. Dozens more homes sustained minor to moderate damage. Many garages and other small buildings were damaged, and hundreds of trees were either snapped or uprooted, some of which fell on homes. Numerous power lines were knocked down as well. Two people sustained minor injuries.
EF1	WSW of Tampico	Whiteside	Illinois	41.6003°N 89.8725°W	01:20–01:22	2.17 mi (3.49 km)	20 yd (18 m)	Outbuildings were damaged, a farm irrigation system was flipped over, and trees were uprooted.
EF1	SW of Sherrill	Dubuque	Iowa	42.5947°N 90.8138°W	01:25–01:31	3.8 mi (6.1 km)	50 yd (46 m)	Outbuildings were significantly damaged, and several trees were uprooted.
EF1	N of Potosi to W of Ellenboro	Grant	Wisconsin	42.7060°N 90.7067°W	01:35–01:41	6.22 mi (10.01 km)	120 yd (110 m)	Numerous farms and outbuildings were damaged, and trees and power lines were blown down.
EF1	Western Peoria	Peoria	Illinois	40.6571°N 89.6754°W	01:58–02:03	3.27 mi (5.26 km)	50 yd (46 m)	This tornado touched down in the western part of Peoria. Roofs were damaged at a shopping center and in a subdivision, and trees were damaged at a golf course.
EF1	E of Oregon to WSW of Stillman Valley	Ogle	Illinois	42.0178°N 89.2964°W	02:13–02:24	7.03 mi (11.31 km)	400 yd (370 m)	Several structures were damaged, primarily barns and outbuildings. A few homes were damaged as well. and trees and power lines were downed.

== See also ==
- Weather of 2020
- List of North American tornadoes and tornado outbreaks
- 2021 Monette–Samburg tornado – an EF4 tornado that affected the Lake City community east of Jonesboro in December 2021
