= WZNA-LD =

Television station in Guaynabo, Puerto Rico

WNVI-LD
- Guaynabo–San Juan; Puerto Rico
- City: Guaynabo, Puerto Rico
- Channels: Digital: 3 (VHF); Virtual: 3
- Branding: Cielo TV

Programming
- Subchannels: 3.1: Cielo TV
- Affiliations: Religious

Ownership
- Owner: New Life Broadcasting; (Juan Carlos Matos Barreto)
- Sister stations: WNVM, WNVE, WDNO, WCLO-TV, WKHD-LD, W06DA-D

History
- Founded: May 17, 2011
- First air date: April 1, 2014
- Former call signs: W40DE-D (2011–2012); W03BS-D (2012–2013); WVTE-LD (2013–2016)
- Former channel numbers: Digital: 40 (UHF, 2011–2012)
- Former affiliations: CNN Latino (2013)
- Call sign meaning: "Nueva Vida"

Technical information
- Licensing authority: FCC
- Facility ID: 182895
- ERP: 2.7 kW
- HAAT: 599 m (1,965 ft)
- Transmitter coordinates: 18°16′49.0″N 66°6′35.0″W

Links
- Public license information: LMS
- Website: www.nuevavida.fm

WNVI-LD (channel 3), branded on-air as Cielo TV, is a Spanish religious television station licensed to Guaynabo, Puerto Rico. the station is owned by New Life Broadcasting; the owners of radio stations WNVM 97.7 FM, WDNO 960 AM & WNVE 98.7 FM. The licensee is managed by Juan Carlos Matos Barreto, who serves as President & General manager of the station. The station's transmitter is located at Cerro La Marquesa in Aguas Buenas. WNVI-LD is part of the Nueva Vida Christian Television network. The station's programming consists of Christian music videos.

== Subchannel ==
=== Digital channel ===
Channel	Res.	Short name	Programming
3.1	720p	WNVI-TV	Cielo TV

== About Cielo TV ==
OptimaVision starts as a video-streaming service. On November 14, 2013, OptimaVision launched WNTE-LD channel 36 in Mayaguez, now owned by Make TV Corporation, as a satellite of WVDO-LD. WZNA-LD (as WVTE-LD) followed on March 24, 2014. WCLO-TV, channel 50 (formerly a repeater for WUJA channel 58), was sold for $29 million to Western New Life, Inc. on May 2, 2014, and became the third channel in the network. NCN Television moved its programming to WQHA-DT2. On January 1, 2018, OptimaVision rebrands itself as Zona TV. On August 1, the station Was once again rebranded as Nueva Vida TV. On January 1 2025 is Renamed as Cielo TV.
