= WMLG =

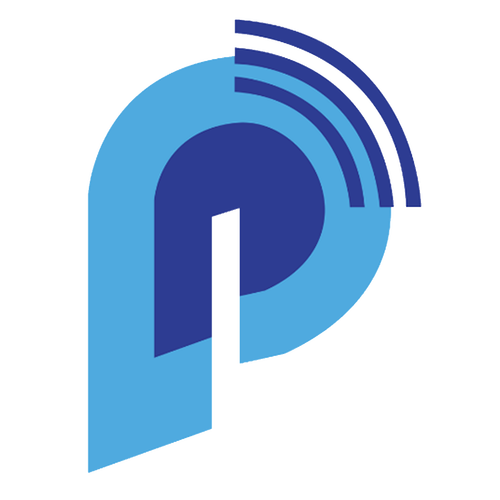
- Guayanilla, Puerto Rico; Puerto Rico
- Broadcast area: Puerto Rico
- Frequency: 89.9 MHz
- Branding: Pura Palabra Radio

Programming
- Format: Contemporary Christian

Ownership
- Owner: Pura Palabra Media Group; (Caguas Educational TV, Inc.)
- Sister stations: WBYM, WQML, WLAZ, WUJA

History
- First air date: June 25, 2013; 13 years ago
- Former call signs: WDPP (2011–2017)

Technical information
- Licensing authority: FCC
- Facility ID: 176335
- Class: A
- ERP: 500 watts
- HAAT: −129.0 meters (−423.2 ft)
- Transmitter coordinates: 18°01′04.9″N 66°46′21″W

Links
- Public license information: Public file; LMS
- Webcast: Listen Live
- Website: purapalabra.com

WMLG (89.9 FM) is a radio station broadcasting a Contemporary Christian format. Licensed to Guayanilla, Puerto Rico, it serves the southern and western Puerto Rico area. The station is currently owned by Pura Palabra Media Group. Originally known as WDPP, the station was a satellite of WLUZ, Sacra FM, until 2016. in that year, WMLG was known as Faro de Santidad. The station changed its call sign to WMLG on July 10, 2017. Due to the passage of Hurricane Maria, WMLG forced to go off the air on September 25, 2017. The station returned to the air as a satellite of Pura Palabra Radio on June 7, 2018.

On July 18, WMLG was sold by La Gigante Siembra to Pura Palabra Media Group, owner of Christian radio and television stations in Puerto Rico for over $100,000. This gives Pura Palabra its first radio station in the southern region. According to the FCC filing, $600,000 will be paid with the transfer of the license, and four annual payments of $100,000. In the event of non-payment, the license will revert to La Gigante Siembra.

WMLG alongside WBYM in Bayamon will join other stations owned by Pura Palabra Media Group, radio stations WLAZ in Kissimmee, Florida, WQML in Ceiba, W268BK in San Juan and Television station WUJA in Caguas, Puerto Rico. The sale was completed on September 12, 2018.
