= WCLO-TV =

Television station in Aguada, Puerto Rico

- Aguada–Mayagüez; Puerto Rico
- City: Aguada, Puerto Rico
- Channels: Digital: 25 (UHF); Virtual: 50
- Branding: Cielo TV

Programming
- Affiliations: 25.1/50.1: Religious

Ownership
- Owner: New Life Broadcasting; (Western New Life, Inc.)
- Sister stations: WNVM; WNVE; WDNO; WZNA-LD

History
- First air date: April 19, 1993
- Former call signs: WQHA (1990–2024)
- Former names: Nueva Vida TV (2017–2024)
- Former channel numbers: Analog: 50 (UHF, 1993–2009); Digital: 62 (UHF, 2005–2009), 50 (UHF, 2009–2019); Virtual: 50 (2009–2018)
- Former affiliations: Satellite of WUJA (1993–2014)
- Call sign meaning: Cielo

Technical information
- Facility ID: 3255
- ERP: 26.9 kW
- HAAT: 908 m (2,979 ft)
- Transmitter coordinates: 18°13′56.5″N 66°45′42″W
- Repeater: WJPX 50.11 San Juan

Links
- Website: www.nuevavida.fm

W06DA-D (translator of WCLO-TV)
- Aguada–Mayagüez; Puerto Rico
- City: Aguada, Puerto Rico
- Channels: Digital: 6 (VHF); Virtual: 6
- Branding: Cielo TV

Programming
- Subchannels: 6.1: Cielo TV
- Affiliations: Religious/Positiv

Ownership
- Owner: New Life Broadcasting; (Juan Carlos Matos Barreto)

History
- Founded: December 18, 2012

Technical information
- Facility ID: 188724
- ERP: 3.7 kW
- HAAT: 750 m (2,461 ft)
- Transmitter coordinates: 18°9′0.0″N 66°59′0.0″W

WKHD-LD (translator of WCLO-TV)
- Mayaguez / Aguadilla, Puerto Rico
- Channels: Digital: 15 (UHF) Virtual: 15
- Branding: Cielo TV

Programming
- Subchannels: 15.1: Cielo TV
- Affiliations: Religious/Positiv

Ownership
- Owner: New Life Broadcasting; (Juan Carlos Matos Barreto)

History
- Founded: June 6, 2016
- Former call signs: W44DW-D (2016-2020); W15EI-D (2020–2021)
- Former channel numbers: Digital: 44 (UHF, 2017–2020)

Technical information
- Facility ID: 188817
- ERP: 1.9 kW
- HAAT: 790 m (2,592 ft)
- Transmitter coordinates: 18°18′41.8″N 67°11′24.6″W

WCLO-TV (channel 25), branded on-air as Cielo TV, is a Spanish-language religious television station licensed to Aguada, Puerto Rico. Founded in 1993, the station is owned and operated by New Life Broadcasting, making it a sister station to radio stations WNVM, WDNO and WNVE. The licensee is Western New Life, Inc. WCLO-TV's programming is also seen on translator station, W06DA-D, channel 6 in Aguada. The station broadcasts Christian music videos 24 hours a day.

WKHD-LD (channel 15) serves as a full-time translator of WCLO-TV and covers all the entire western region.

== Cielo TV Christian Television Network ==
WCLO-TV is the flagship station of the Nueva Vida Christian Television Network, it is simulcasting on low-power television stations, WZNA-LD, channel 3.1 in Guaynabo, Puerto Rico, and WKHD-LD channel 15.1 in Mayaguez, Puerto Rico. Both stations are owned by New Life Broadcasting's president, Juan Carlos Matos Barreto.

== Digital television ==
=== Digital channels ===
==== WCLO-TV subchannels ====
WCLO-TV's signal is multiplexed:

| Channel | Res. | Short name | Programming |
|---|---|---|---|
| 25.1 | 720p | WCLO-D1 | Cielo TV |
| 50.1 | 720p | WCLO-D2 | Cielo TV |

==== W06DA-D subchannels ====
W06DA-D's signal is multiplexed:

| Channel | Res. | Short name | Programming |
|---|---|---|---|
| 6.1 | 720p | WCLO-DT | Cielo TV |

==== WKHD-LD subchannels ====
WKHD-LD's signal is multiplexed:

| Channel | Res. | Short name | Programming |
|---|---|---|---|
| 15.1 | 720p | WKHD-DT | Cielo TV |

=== Analog-to-digital conversion ===
On January 13, 2009, WCLO-TV (as WQHA) signed off its analog signal and completed its move to digital.

== About Nueva Vida TV (Now Cielo TV) ==
OptimaVision starts as a video-streaming service. On November 14, 2013, OptimaVision launched WNTE-LD channel 36 in Mayaguez, now owned by Make TV Corporation, as a satellite of WVDO-LD. WVTE-LD Channel 3 followed on March 24, 2014. WQHA Channel 50 (formerly a repeater for WUJA) was sold for $29 million to Western New Life, Inc. on May 2, 2014, and became the third channel in the network. NCN Television moved its programming to digital subchannel 50.2. On January 1, 2018, OptimaVision rebrands itself as Zona TV. On August 1, the station Was once again rebranded as Nueva Vida TV. ON January 1 2025, the Station is once again named Chanced as Cielo TV.

== FCC spectrum auction and WQHA sale ==
In 2012, the Federal Communications Commission announced they were going to hold a voluntary Incentive Auction for a portion of the radio frequency spectrum that is currently used by Digital Television broadcasters across the country. WQHA's owner, New Life Broadcasting announced he would participate in the auction, since it was estimated the station would net somewhere in the range of US$127 Million, much more than it would be worth on the open market otherwise. Since that time the auction estimate has increased to somewhere between $95 and US$50 Million, with the auction currently scheduled to take place in early 2016.
