= WDNO =

Quebradillas, Puerto Rico; Puerto Rico
- Frequency: 960 kHz
- Branding: Nueva Vida

Programming
- Format: Contemporary Christian

Ownership
- Owner: Juan Carlos Matos Barreto and Ana G. Velez Montes; (New Life Broadcasting Inc.)
- Sister stations: WNVM, WNVE, WZNA-LD, WCLO-TV, WKHD-LD

History
- First air date: 1985; 41 years ago
- Former call signs: WJYT (1985–1988); WORR (1988–1992); WKVN (1992–2004); WCHQ (2004–2011)
- Call sign meaning: Del; Norte

Technical information
- Licensing authority: FCC
- Facility ID: 11621
- Class: B
- Power: 10,000 watts
- Transmitter coordinates: 18°20′58.00″N 67°15′51.00″W
- Translators: 97.9 W250CF (Arecibo); 104.5 W283DR (Aguadilla)

Links
- Public license information: Public file; LMS
- Website: nuevavida.fm

WDNO (960 AM), branded on-air as Nueva Vida, is a radio station broadcasting a Contemporary Christian format. Licensed to Quebradillas, Puerto Rico, the station is currently owned by Juan Carlos Matos Barreto and Ana G. Velez Montes, through licensee New Life Broadcasting. WDNO is simulcast on W250CF 97.9 FM in Arecibo and W283DR 104.5 FM in Aguadilla.

== History ==
The station was assigned the call letters WJYT on 1982-06-28. On 1988-07-07, the station changed its call sign to WORR, on 1992-09-28 to WKVN, on 2004-07-06 to WCHQ, and on 2011-01-19 to the current WDNO.

== Ownership ==
In July 2003, International Broadcasting Corp. (Angel Roman, president) reached an agreement to buy two radio stations, WRSJ and WKVN (now WDNO), from Concillio Mision Cristiano Fuente de Agua Viva Inc. (Otoniel Font, president) for a reported sale price of $1.45 million.

Since October 1, 2016 and after 29 years broadcasting in the frequency 103.7 FM, WDNO and the translator station with the approval of the Federal Communications Commission in the United States, has changed to 97.9 FM for best coverage. In March 2018, the station announced that the FM translator in Arecibo will move the frequency to 98.3 FM in the next few months and the callsign will change to W252EA, pending FCC approval, But the translator remain itself on the same frequency (97.9 MHz) and with the same call letters (W250CF).

== Translator stations ==
Broadcast translators for WDNO
Call sign	Frequency	City of license	FID	ERP (W)	FCC info
W250CF	97.9 FM	Arecibo, Puerto Rico	26656	.023	LMS
W283DR	104.5 FM	Aguadilla, Puerto Rico	202073	.025	LMS
