= Indian Mall =

Former shopping mall in Jonesboro, Arkansas

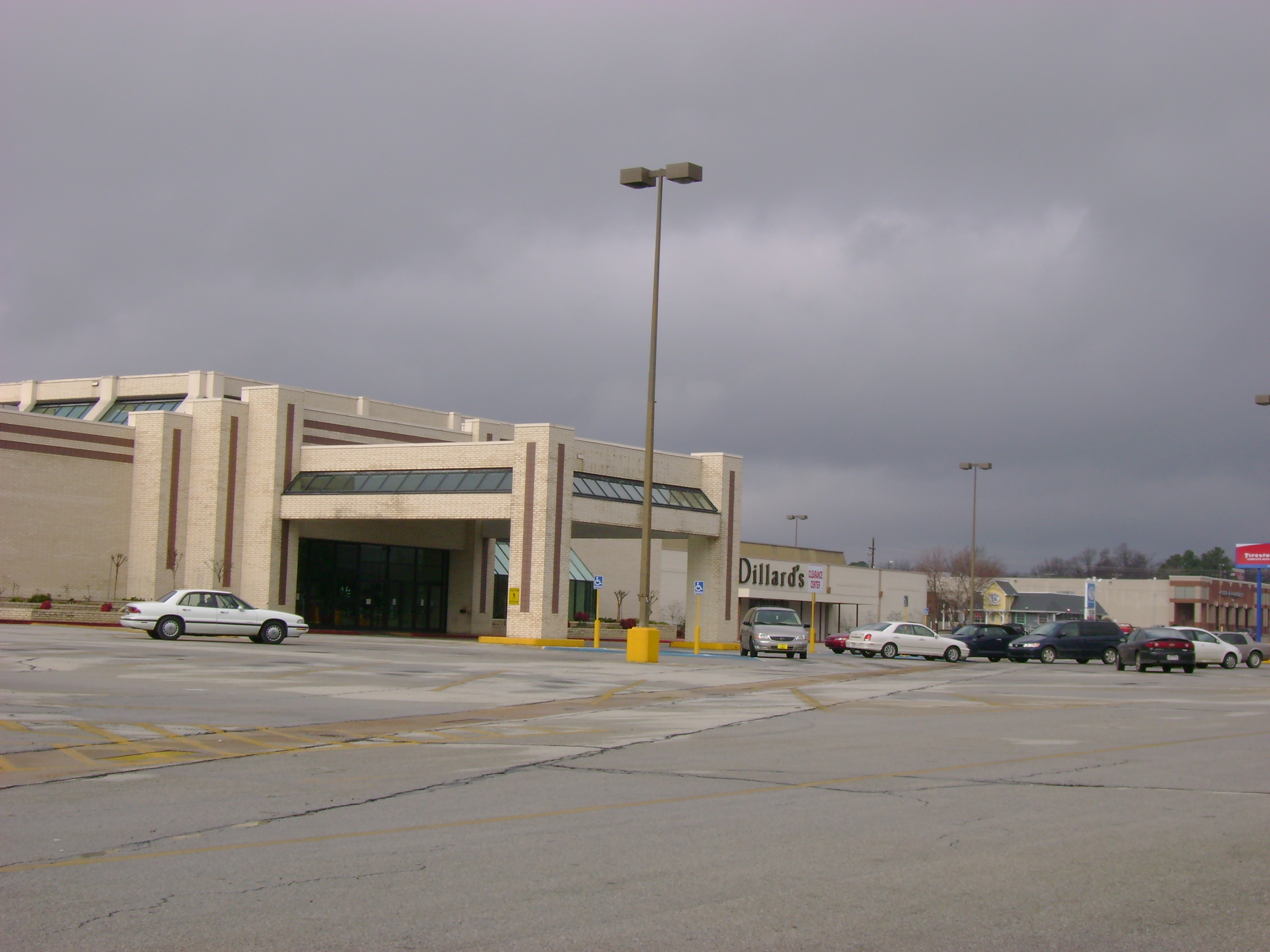
- The front and main entrance of Indian Mall
- Location: Jonesboro, Arkansas, United States
- Coordinates: 35.8233°N 90.6797°W
- Opened: May 1, 1968; 58 years ago
- Closed: February 2008; 18 years ago
- Developer: Warmack & Co. LLC
- Manager: MBC Holdings LLC
- Owner: MBC Holdings LLC
- Num. of stores: 2
- Num. of anchor tenants: 4
- Floor area: 385,641 sq ft (35,827.2 m^{2})
- Floors: 1
- Parking: 1,000 spaces

Indian Mall was an enclosed shopping mall located at the intersection of Highland Drive and Caraway Road in Jonesboro, Arkansas. The location was close in proximity to the junction of Interstate 555 and Arkansas Highway 1.

For more than thirty years, Indian Mall was the only shopping center serving Northeast Arkansas. The nearby opening of The Mall at Turtle Creek in 2006 drew many tenants away from Indian Mall, including the Dillard's and JCPenney anchors. Indian Mall then became a dead mall, losing all of its tenants except for Sears, an insurance office and a GameStop which remained for nearly two years. As of February 2008, the mall has been closed off except for Sears, and was demolished for a Kroger in 2012.

== Mall development ==
Indian Mall opened in 1968 as a shopping destination for Jonesboro and northeastern Arkansas. It was also the second mall in the state (the first being Phoenix Village Mall in Fort Smith). Indian Mall derived its name from the name of nearby Arkansas State University's mascot.

The mall first opened as a small shopping center with Blass (a chain owned by Dillard's; the store was later re-branded Dillard's), TG&Y, Sears, and a supermarket called Stimson's. The mall sustained heavy damage during a series of tornadoes that struck the city on May 27, 1973. JCPenney was added in 1976. TG&Y closed in the 1980s; Dillard's then moved its men's wear and home goods to the former TG&Y space. The supermarket space was converted to a food court in the 1980s as well.

Indian Mall was used to host various events including athletic team appearances and signings as well as fundraisers for different organizations across the state and country.

In 1998, shortly after the Westside Middle School shooting, Indian Mall received significant press coverage as the location where Rev. Phillip McClure, a local pastor, started ministering to people.

Until 2006, Indian Mall was the only mall serving northeastern Arkansas. It featured a variety of national chain tenants, including The Gap, Waldenbooks, Sam Goody, KB Toys, and Dollar Tree.

== New mall proposals ==
As early as 1994, rumors circulated on the arrival of a newer, larger mall to serve the expanding city. Two mall proposals eventually surfaced, one of the proposals being made by Indian Mall's owner, Warmack & Company. Warmack's proposal, dubbed Southern Hills Mall, was to feature a similar tenant roster to the Indian Mall. Southern Hills Mall was also slated to include newer, larger stores for JCPenney, Dillard's, and Sears, in addition to a new Target; the Indian Mall would then be converted to non-retail use under this plan. Meanwhile, David Hocker & Associates, a company based in Kentucky, was also proposing a new mall, called The Mall at Turtle Creek; this proposed mall was also to feature Dillard's among its anchors.

Due to a variety of issues, Warmack's Southern Hills Mall never materialized. However, The Mall at Turtle Creek did open in 2006, including a new Dillard's and a new JCPenney among its anchors. As a result, JCPenney closed its store at Indian Mall, and the Dillard's at Indian Mall was converted to a clearance center (with the Dillard's Men's store closing entirely). Similarly, many of the older mall's tenants re-located to the Mall at Turtle Creek. The site where Southern Hills Mall would have been built has since been put up for sale.

=== Closure and redevelopment ===
In August 2007, MBC Holdings entered into talks with the Warmack Company to purchase the Indian Mall. MBC Holdings plans on destructing most of the site and then developing it into additional retail space. The deal is contingent on several areas. One is the city of Jonesboro's willingness to allow more retail development and plans for the stores that still occupy the Indian mall and have multi-year leases.

MBC Holdings LLC closed on the property in late 2007. The mall closed February 2008, and was demolished in March 2012. In June 2013, a request was approved to tear down the mall and replace it with a Kroger store.

On December 28, 2016, it was announced that Sears would be closing as part of a plan to close 30 stores nationwide. The store closed in April 2017. The auto center closed on October 14, 2017.
