= WNVM =

Cidra, Puerto Rico; Puerto Rico
- Broadcast area: Puerto Rico
- Frequency: 97.7 MHz
- Branding: Nueva Vida FM

Programming
- Format: Contemporary Christian

Ownership
- Owner: New Life Broadcasting; (New Life Broadcasting, Inc.)
- Sister stations: WNVE, WDNO, WZNA-LD, WCLO-TV, WKHD-LD

History
- First air date: March 1, 1972 (53 years ago)
- Former call signs: WBRQ (1972–2009)
- Call sign meaning: Nueva Vida Musica

Technical information
- Licensing authority: FCC
- Facility ID: 1891
- Class: A
- ERP: 38,000 watts
- HAAT: 829.0 meters (2,719.8 ft)
- Transmitter coordinates: 18°16′49.27″N 66°56′35.30″W
- Repeater: 97.7 WNVM-FM1 (Cayey)

Links
- Public license information: Public file; LMS
- Website: nuevavida.fm

WNVM (97.7 FM), branded on-air as Nueva Vida FM, is a radio station licensed to serve Cidra, Puerto Rico. The station is owned by New Life Broadcasting, Inc.

WNVM broadcasts a Contemporary Christian music format to all of Puerto Rico.

Known as WBRQ from its founding in 1972 until 2009, this station was assigned the WNVM call letters by the Federal Communications Commission on January 27, 2009.

The station is relayed through booster station, WNVM-FM1 in Cayey, which also broadcasts at 97.7 FM.

== List of Nueva Vida stations ==
Call sign	Frequency	City of license	FCC info
WNVM	97.7 FM	Cidra, PR	FCC (WNVM)
WNVM-FM1	97.7 FM	Cayey, PR	FCC (WNVM-FM1)
WNVE	98.7 FM	Culebra, PR	FCC (WNVE)
WDNO	960 AM	Quebradillas, PR	FCC (WDNO)
W250CF	97.9 FM	Arecibo, PR	FCC (W250CF)
W283DR	104.5 FM	Aguadilla, PR	FCC (W283DR)

== Nueva Vida TV ==
On November 14, 2013, OptimaVision launched WNTE-LD Channel 36. WVTE-LD (now WZNA-LD) Channel 3 followed on March 24, 2014. WQHA Channel 50 (formerly a repeater for WUJA) was sold for $29 million to Western New Life, Inc. on May 2, 2014, and became the third channel in the network. NCN Television moved its programming to digital subchannel 50.2. On January 1, 2018, OptimaVision relaunched as Zona TV. As of March 2020, the stations now used the Nueva Vida TV branding.

== List of Nueva Vida TV stations ==
- WZNA-LD Channel 3.1 Guaynabo, Puerto Rico (New Life Broadcasting flagship station)
- WKHD-LD Channel 15.1 Mayaguez, Puerto Rico (secondary station)
- W06DA-D Channel 6.1 Aguada, Puerto Rico (translator station)
- WCLO-TV Channel 25.1 Aguada, Puerto Rico (Owned by Western New Life, Inc.)

== TAB Deportes 101.3 ==
TAB Deportes began broadcasting on October 18, 2013, with 18 hours a day of sports programming, including from Tiro Al Blanco. TAB Deportes was transmitting on W267BL 101.3 FM & WNVM 97.7 FM HD3. On February 24, 2014, TAB Deportes ceased operations after 5 months on the air, and will replace WUJA's audio signal on 101.3FM. On June 15, 2014, W267BL changed its callsign & frequency to W268BK 101.5 FM. Currently, W268BK is owned by Caguas Educational TV, inc., the owners of WUJA.

== Programming ==
- En Ruta
- Gózatelo con Nonny
- De Show Con Kenny Joe
- Nueva Vida En la Noche
- Nueva Vida Urbano
- Nueva Vida En el Fin de Semana

== Logos ==
Former WNVM logo from 2009 to 2016.
