= WLAZ =

Spanish-language contemporary Christian music radio station in Kissimmee, Florida

Coordinates: 28.174°N 81.283°W

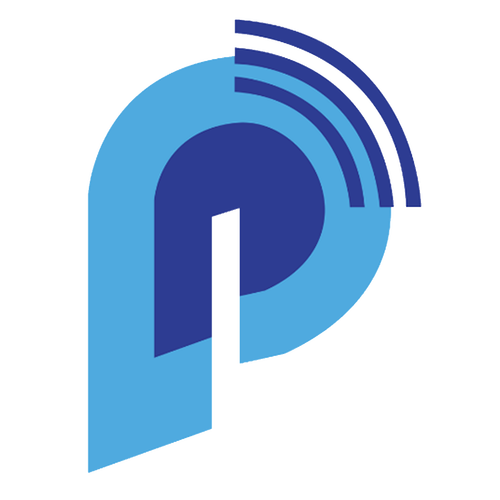
- Kissimmee, Florida; United States
- Broadcast area: Central Florida
- Frequency: 89.1 MHz
- Branding: "Pura Palabra Radio"

Programming
- Format: Spanish Contemporary Christian

Ownership
- Owner: Pura Palabra Media Group; (Caguas Educational TV, Inc.)
- Sister stations: WUJA, WQML, WBYM, WMLG

Technical information
- Licensing authority: FCC
- Facility ID: 27292
- Class: C3
- ERP: 5,200 watts
- HAAT: 159 meters (522 ft)

Links
- Public license information: Public file; LMS
- Website: www.purapalabra.com

WLAZ (89.1 FM) is a non-commercial, listener-supported radio station broadcasting a Spanish Contemporary Christian radio format. Licensed to Kissimmee, Florida, United States, it serves the Kissimmee / St. Cloud area. The station is currently owned by Pura Palabra Media Group.
