= WNVE (FM) =

Culebra, Puerto Rico; Puerto Rico
- Frequency: 98.7 MHz
- Branding: Nueva Vida FM

Programming
- Format: Contemporary Christian

Ownership
- Owner: New Life Broadcasting; (Juan Carlos Matos Barreto)
- Sister stations: WNVM, WDNO, WZNA-LD, WCLO-TV, WKHD-LD

History
- First air date: 2009; 17 years ago
- Former call signs: WQML (2009–2013); WNVE (2013–2014); WQML (2014–2018)

Technical information
- Licensing authority: FCC
- Facility ID: 183333
- Class: A
- ERP: 6,000 watts
- HAAT: 821.0 meters (2,693.6 ft)
- Transmitter coordinates: 18°57′49.8″N 65°26′27.8″W

Links
- Public license information: Public file; LMS
- Website: nuevavida.fm

WNVE (98.7 MHz) is an FM radio station from Culebra, Puerto Rico broadcasting a Contemporary Christian format. This station is owned by New Life Broadcasting, which licensee is held by Juan Carlos Matos Barreto (President & General Manager of the station).

On November 9, 2017, New Life Broadcasting (Juan Carlos Matos Barreto, president) files to swap WNVE/101.5 in Ceiba and a $1.2 million cash payment to Pura Palabra Media Group (Otoniel Font, president) in exchange for the then-WQML. Once the swap closes, will switch back to the original WNVE call letters and Nueva Vida FM Programming. According to the terms of the contract New Life will allow Pura Palabra Media to program the HD3 channel of WNVM as part of the deal in order to feed its San Juan-licensed translator W268BK at 101.5 FM which carries its Pura Palabra Radio programming. The sale was completed on May 24, 2018.

The station changed its call sign to WNVE on March 30, 2018.
