= WQML (FM) =

Contemporary Christian radio station in Ceiba, Puerto Rico

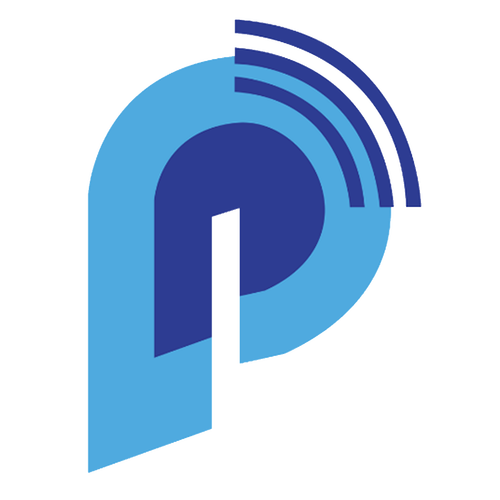

Ceiba, Puerto Rico; Puerto Rico
- Frequency: 101.5 MHz
- Branding: Pura Palabra Radio

Programming
- Format: Contemporary Christian

Ownership
- Owner: Pura Palabra Media Group; (Caguas Educational TV)
- Sister stations: WUJA, WLAZ, WBYM, WMLG

History
- First air date: June 23, 1995; 30 years ago
- Former call signs: WXZX (1995–2007); WJZG (2007–2009); WNVE (2009–2013); WQML (2013–2014); WNVE (2014–2018)
- Former frequencies: 106.5 MHz (1995–2007); 102.1 MHz (2007–2014); 101.7 MHz (2014–2017)

Technical information
- Licensing authority: FCC
- Facility ID: 3250
- Class: B
- ERP: 50,000 watts
- HAAT: 824.0 meters (2,703.4 ft)
- Transmitter coordinates: 18°16′57.2″N 65°40′14.4″W

Links
- Public license information: Public file; LMS
- Webcast: Listen Live
- Website: purapalabra.com

WQML (101.5 MHz), branded on-air as Pura Palabra Radio, is an FM radio station broadcasting a Contemporary Christian format. Licensed to Ceiba, Puerto Rico, the station serves the eastern Puerto Rico area. The station is currently owned by Pura Palabra Media Group through its licensee, Caguas Educational TV.

On November 9, 2017, Pura Palabra Media Group (Otoniel Font, president) files to swap WQML/98.7 in Culebra and a $1.2 million cash payment to New Life Broadcasting (Juan Carlos Matos Barreto, president) in exchange for the then-WNVE. Once the swap closes, the station will switch to Pura Palabra Radio and the call letters will changed to WQML. According to the terms of the contract, New Life will allow Pura Palabra Media to program the HD3 channel of WNVM as part of the deal in order to feed its San Juan-licensed translator W268BK at 101.5 FM which carries its Pura Palabra Radio programming. The sale was completed on May 10, 2018.

The station changed its call sign to WQML on March 30, 2018.
