= WBRQ (FM) =

LaGrange, Georgia; United States
- Frequency: 91.9 MHz
- Branding: Q92

Programming
- Format: Defunct (formerly Blues/Gospel)

Ownership
- Owner: Ben Jordan Communications Corporation

History
- Former call signs: WGLG (2008); WWOF (2008–2009)

Technical information
- Licensing authority: FCC
- Facility ID: 90858
- Class: A
- ERP: 1,000 watts
- HAAT: 13 metres (43 ft)
- Transmitter coordinates: 32°00′48″N 85°02′58″W

Links
- Public license information: Public file; LMS
- Webcast: Listen Live
- Website: Official Website

WBRQ (91.9 FM) was a radio station licensed to serve the community of LaGrange, Georgia. The station was owned by Ben Jordan Communications Corporation, and aired a blues/gospel format.

The station was assigned the call sign WGLG by the Federal Communications Commission (FCC) on June 25, 2008. The station changed its call sign to WWOF on November 7, 2008, and to WBRQ on February 4, 2009.

Effective November 3, 2023, the FCC cancelled WBRQ's license, due to the station having been silent since at least July 25, 2022.
