= KAIT =

Television station in Jonesboro, Arkansas

- Jonesboro, Arkansas; United States
- Channels: Digital: 27 (UHF); Virtual: 8
- Branding: KAIT, K8; K8 News; CW K8 (8.3)

Programming
- Affiliations: 8.1: ABC; 8.2: NBC; 8.3: CW+

Ownership
- Owner: Gray Media; (Gray Television Licensee, LLC)
- Sister stations: KJTB-LD, KJBW-LD

History
- First air date: July 15, 1963
- Former call signs: KAIT-TV (1963–2003)
- Former channel numbers: Analog: 8 (VHF, 1963–2009); Digital: 9 (VHF, 2001–2009), 8 (VHF, 2009–2021)
- Former affiliations: Independent (1963–1965)

Technical information
- Licensing authority: FCC
- Facility ID: 13988
- ERP: 1,000 kW
- HAAT: 527.4 m (1,730 ft)
- Transmitter coordinates: 35°53′22″N 90°56′8″W

Links
- Public license information: Public file; LMS
- Website: www.kait8.com

KAIT (channel 8) is a television station in Jonesboro, Arkansas, United States, affiliated with ABC, NBC, and The CW Plus. It is owned by Gray Media alongside Telemundo affiliate KJTB-LD (channel 36) and KJBW-LD (channel 35). The three stations share studios on New Haven Church Road (County Road 766) north of Jonesboro; KAIT's transmitter is located north of Egypt, Arkansas.

KAIT began broadcasting in 1963 as an independent station before becoming an ABC affiliate in 1965. It was built by George Hernreich, a Fort Smith businessman. Hernreich paid bribes to an ABC representative in 1969, resulting in a years-long legal challenge that almost saw KAIT lose its broadcast license. After the Federal Communications Commission (FCC) reversed an earlier decision to revoke the KAIT license, the station was sold to Channel Communications in 1984, Cosmos Broadcasting in 1986, and Raycom Media in 2005. Under Raycom, KAIT added subchannels affiliated with NBC and The CW. Raycom merged with Gray Television in 2019. The station has traditionally dominated the Jonesboro media market in revenue and ratings, though its coverage area and viewership extends beyond the defined media market.

== History ==
=== Construction and early years ===
Though channel 8 was assigned to Jonesboro in 1952, it went unused for a decade. Jonesboro radio station KBTM applied for channel 8 in 1954 and was granted a construction permit for KBTM-TV in 1955, only to seek to transfer it the next year to the owner of KATV in Pine Bluff. KATV intended to use KBTM-TV to broadcast its ABC programming and shows aired by the Pine Bluff station as well as local shows, which would be produced by KBTM radio staff. Construction never started, and the permit was surrendered in late October 1957. The surrender followed the Federal Communications Commission (FCC) issuing a letter to the station asking why it should not have its permit stripped.

Radio station KXJK in Forrest City, Arkansas, asked the FCC in May 1958 to move channel 8 there. The proposal was rebutted by George Hernreich, a Fort Smith businessman, who declared his intention to apply for channel 8 at Jonesboro. The FCC denied the KXJK move request in February 1959 and granted Hernreich's application for channel 8 on April 8, 1960, after KBTM (by this time under new ownership) withdrew a competing application.

Construction of KAIT-TV began in early 1963 at a site 4 miles (6.4 km) north of Jonesboro. During erection of the 300-foot (91 m) tower, the large antenna crashed to the ground. After weeks of test patterns and sporadic other broadcasts, KAIT-TV began regular programming on July 15, 1963. It was an independent station, airing local features including news and a children's show as well as movies.

=== ABC affiliation and FCC hearing ===
The station joined ABC on October 1, 1965, enabling it to present color network programming and lengthen its broadcast day. Network affiliation provided resources that KAIT had instead been obtaining without permission. The station had previously rebroadcast programs from other stations without authorization, including coverage of the Watts riots and two Project Gemini launches, as well as excerpts from NBC's Huntley-Brinkley Report. In 1966, the FCC fined Hernreich $1,000 for this and other violations. KAIT renewed its ABC affiliation in 1967, and Hernreich sought increases in the network compensation rate ABC paid it to air network programming. Hernreich was successful in seeking these increases after he made two bribes to Thomas G. Sullivan, a regional station relations manager for the network.

In March 1970, the FCC began a private investigation into allegations of station owners bribing ABC for network affiliation after ABC accused Sullivan of accepting a bribe from WKTR-TV serving Dayton, Ohio. After Sullivan was fired, ABC rescinded the compensation increases it had previously granted to KAIT-TV. The inquiry implicated Hernreich and indicated that he may have paid an ABC representative. As a result, in July 1971, the FCC designated KAIT-TV's broadcast license renewal for hearing. It allowed Hernreich to start broadcasting KFPW-TV at Fort Smith but conditioned a final license on the outcome of the hearing. In April 1973, FCC administrative law judge Forest L. McClenning ruled that Hernreich should lose the licenses for both stations. He found that Hernreich lacked the qualifications to be a broadcast licensee, putting his other holdings—two AM radio stations and an FM outlet in other Arkansas cities—in peril. McClenning rejected allegations from Hernreich that the payments were made on threat of losing the ABC affiliation for KAIT-TV. On appeal to the FCC in 1974, Hernreich won a license for KFPW-TV in Fort Smith and was found to be generally qualified, but the commission on a 3-2 vote denied a license renewal for KAIT-TV.

Hernreich petitioned the FCC to reconsider its split action on his television licenses, arguing that such a decision on his actions did not hold water and claiming that the profits from the Jonesboro station were necessary to run KFPW-TV in Fort Smith. His attorneys claimed that the decision was inconsistent and failed to account for ABC's role in the bribery scandal. The FCC ultimately agreed with Hernreich and reversed its 1974 decision in 1979, allowing KAIT-TV to remain on the air.

=== Channel and Cosmos/Liberty ownership ===
After KAIT-TV's license was renewed, George Hernreich stepped down as chairman of Hernreich Broadcasting Stations in 1980. In 1981, the station installed a new transmitter, increasing its coverage area. Three years later, his son Bob—citing the distance between Jonesboro and Fort Smith and an interest to pursue other business ventures—sold KAIT for $22 million to Channel Communications, Inc. of Nashville, Tennessee. Channel was a subsidiary of NASCO, Inc., a maker of licensed goods for the National Football League diversifying into the broadcasting business. KAIT was the second of three stations Channel purchased between August 1983 and May 1984, after KPLC in Lake Charles, Louisiana, but before WCLQ-TV in Cleveland.

After two years, Channel Communications exited broadcasting. It agreed to sell KAIT and KPLC to Cosmos Broadcasting Inc., the broadcasting arm of South Carolina–based insurer Liberty Corporation, for a combined $68 million. Cosmos included KAIT and two other stations in an attempted sale to Broad Street Companies of New Haven, Connecticut, in 1992; the deal never closed, as Broad Street failed to finance the transaction.

In January 2003, KAIT began broadcasting a digital signal. KAIT shut down its analog signal on June 12, 2009, and relocated its digital signal from its pre-transition VHF channel 9 to channel 8 for post-transition operations.

=== Raycom and Gray ownership ===
Liberty exited the insurance business in 2000 and merged with Raycom Media in 2006. Under Raycom, KAIT added two digital subchannels offering additional national networks. On January 26, 2015, it launched an NBC affiliate on its 8.2 subchannel, previously used to broadcast weather and occasional local sports coverage. KAIT, which had garnered nearly 97 percent of all television advertising revenue in Jonesboro in 2013, received competition later in 2015 when Waypoint Media launched in-market Fox and CBS affiliate KJNB-LD. In 2018, KAIT added The CW on subchannel 8.3.

Raycom merged with Gray Television in a deal announced in 2018 and finalized in 2019. In 2021, the station moved its transmissions from the VHF to the UHF band.

== News operation ==
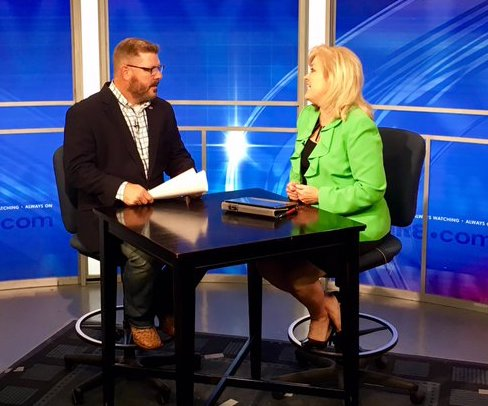
Congressman Rick Crawford being interviewed by Diana Davis on KAIT in 2016

As of 2025, KAIT broadcasts 24 1/2 hours of locally produced newscasts each week, including a 2 1/2-hour morning newscast on weekdays, Good Morning Region 8; weekday newscasts at 11 a.m. and 5, 6, and 10 p.m.; and two weekend newscasts daily.

KAIT has historically served a larger coverage area than its media market. This is because there are counties where KAIT was the most-viewed station but the stations in Little Rock or Memphis, Tennessee, collectively had higher audience share, causing them to be drawn into that market. Within that market, however, KAIT has traditionally dominated the Memphis stations as the only local news source.

=== Notable former on-air staff ===
- Rodger Bumpass – announcer, film processor, cameraman, audio technician, and technical director, 1970s; became the voice of Squidward on SpongeBob SquarePants
- Hogan Gidley – news/weather anchor

== Technical information and subchannels ==
Logos for the ABC, NBC and CW subchannels

KAIT is broadcast from a tower north of Egypt, Arkansas. Its signal is multiplexed:

Subchannels of KAIT
Subchannel	Res.	Short name	Programming
8.1	720p	KAITAB	ABC
8.2	720p	KAITNB	NBC
8.3	720p	KAITCW	The CW Plus
8.4	480i	KAIT365	365BLK

== See also ==
- 2020 Jonesboro tornado, an event covered extensively by KAIT
