= WDWL =

Television station in Bayamón, Puerto Rico

- Bayamón, Puerto Rico
- Channels: Digital: 24 (UHF), shared with WUJA; Virtual: 36
- Branding: TeleAdoración Enlace PR

Programming
- Affiliations: 36.1: Enlace

Ownership
- Owner: TeleAdoración Christian Network, Inc.

History
- First air date: May 11, 1987
- Former channel numbers: Analog: 36 (UHF, 1987–2009); Digital: 59 (UHF, 2006–2009), 30 (UHF, 2009–2018)
- Former affiliations: Religious Independent (1987–2005)

Technical information
- Licensing authority: FCC
- Facility ID: 4110
- ERP: 120 kW
- HAAT: 314.9 m (1,033 ft)
- Transmitter coordinates: 18°16′40.8″N 66°6′31.6″W

Links
- Public license information: Public file; LMS
- Website: teleadoracion.org

WDWL (channel 36) is a television station licensed to Bayamón, Puerto Rico, affiliated with the Spanish-language religious network Enlace. Founded May 11, 1987, the station is owned by TeleAdoración Christian Network. WDWL shares transmitter facilities with WUJA (channel 58) at Cerro La Marquesa in Aguas Buenas. The station has its main studios located at Sabana Seca in Toa Baja.

== Technical information ==
=== Subchannels ===
Subchannels of WUJA and WDWL
License	Channel	Res.	Short name	Programming
WUJA	58.1	480i	WUJA-D1	Main WUJA programming (4:3)
WUJA	58.2	480i	WUJA-D2	Additional religious programming (4:3)
WUJA	58.3	480i	WUJA-D3	Additional religious programming (4:3)
WUJA	58.4	480i	WUJA-D4	Additional religious programming (4:3)
WDWL	36.1	480i	WDWL-DT	Enlace (4:3)

=== Analog-to-digital conversion ===
On June 12, 2009, WDWL signed off its analog signal and completed its move to digital.

=== Spectrum reallocation ===
On August 18, 2017, it was revealed that WDWL's over-the-air spectrum had been sold in the FCC's spectrum reallocation auction, fetching $7.7 million. WDWL did not sign off, but entered into a channel sharing agreement with WUJA, another religious television station that covers the entire metropolitan area.
