= WBYM =

Radio station in Bayamón, Puerto Rico

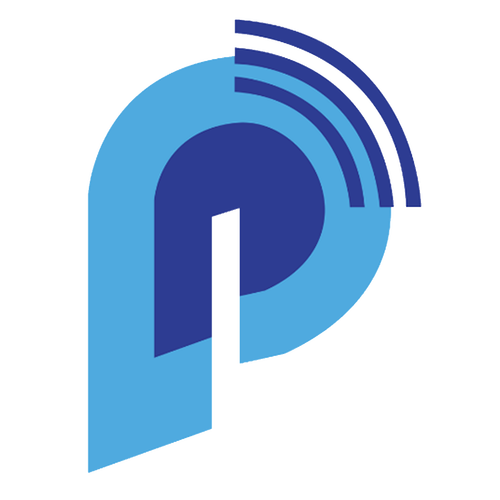
- Bayamón, Puerto Rico; Puerto Rico
- Broadcast area: San Juan
- Frequency: 1560 kHz
- Branding: Pura Palabra Radio

Programming
- Format: Contemporary Christian

Ownership
- Owner: Pura Palabra Media Group; (Caguas Educational TV, Inc.)
- Sister stations: WUJA, WQML, WMLG, WLAZ

History
- First air date: March 5, 1948; 78 years ago
- Former call signs: WENA (1948–1961); WRSJ (1961–2016)
- Call sign meaning: BaYaMon

Technical information
- Licensing authority: FCC
- Facility ID: 295
- Class: B
- Power: 4,000 watts day 740 watts night
- Transmitter coordinates: 18°24′55″N 66°57′14″W
- Translators: 98.1 W251DA (Vega Baja); 101.5 W268BK (San Juan)

Links
- Public license information: Public file; LMS
- Webcast: Listen Live
- Website: purapalabra.com

WBYM (1560 AM, Pura Palabra Radio) is a radio station broadcasting a Contemporary Christian format. licensed to serve Bayamón, Puerto Rico, The station is owned by Pura Palabra Media Group. The station is shared with translator stations W268BK (101.5 FM) in San Juan and W251DA (98.1 FM) in Vega Baja.

The station was assigned the WBYM call letters by the Federal Communications Commission (FCC) on November 21, 2016.

== History ==
WBYM began operations on 1560 kHz on March 5, 1948 as WENA, "La Buena", at that time was owned by Bayamón Broadcasting Corporation and broadcasts the news, talk and variety format. in the 1960s, the station changed the callsign of WRSJ under the name, "Radio San Juan", founded by the late Andrés 'Bubo' Gomez, Gustavo Diaz and Ramon Agudo, and was transmitting Beautiful Music.

== Ownership ==
In December 1994, aviation executive Anthony Tirri announced plans to purchase WRSJ, then known as the former "Radio San Juan," for a reported sale price of $850,000. Tirri also announced that under his ownership the station would switch to English-language programming. At the time, WOSO was the only existing English-language station in the market.

In July 2003, International Broadcasting Corp. (Angel Roman, president) reached an agreement to buy two radio stations, WRSJ and WKVN, from Concillio Mision Cristiano Fuente de Agua Viva Inc. (Otoniel Font, president) for a reported sale price of $1.45 million.

In 2012, WRSJ was rebranded as Pura Palabra 1560AM the day after WVOZ changed its Spanish Tropical format and in late part of 2014, WRSJ went Silent after former owner, International Broadcasting Corporation, returns to its hands.

Since August 1, 2015, Centro Media Group relaunched WRSJ, with a Spanish and English Variety format, and with this new format WRSJ also revives its original branding, known as the new Radio San Juan. Starting in November 2015, WRSJ intends to produce Local programming that provides News, Sports & Entertainment under the management of broadcaster Juan "Papotito" Rosario, who owns and operates other successful radio stations in Puerto Rico. also, will change its branding to Metro Radio 1560 AM.

Effective December 21, 2015, owner International Broadcasting Corporation assigned WRSJ's license to the IBC Divestiture Trust (Jean Paul Vissepó, trustee), to comply with FCC ownership limits.

On November 21, 2016, WRSJ changed its call letters to WBYM. On December 27, 2016, WBYM agrees itself to reacquire the station back to International Broadcasting Corporation from the Divesture Trust. WBYM is still operated by Centro Media Group. IBC now owns 8 radio stations, while CMG owns 3 stations and WBYM is under a time brokage agreement.

On April 3, 2017, WBYM is trying to end Metro Radio format after 2 years, and switched to a diversified Jazz programming, branded as Radio Jazz 1560. This is the third radio station in Puerto Rico that Broadcasts Jazz 24 hours a day (the others are WVID 90.3 FM in Añasco and WIPR-FM 91.3-HD2 in San Juan). as of June 20, 2017, the WBYM's sale to International Broadcasting Corporation has been dismissed.

== Sale to La Mas Z Radio ==
On June 21, 2017, WBYM buys from IBC Divestiture Trust to La Mas Z Radio, Inc., the largest owner of radio stations in Puerto Rico. is swapping WTIL 1300 AM in Mayaguez to Wilfredo Blanco Pi from WBYM. The deal also involves International Broadcasting Corporation. receiving land and equipment at the site of WAPA 680 AM in Carolina, Puerto Rico from Blanco Pi and permission to relocate WGIT 1660 AM in Canovanas to that site and build a transmitter building, and IBC may sell or rent at $600 a month the WBYM transmitter site to La Mas Z Radio. When the transaction closes, WBYM would switch back to a Spanish Variety format soon, and joining other stations of the Matos Barreto Family, WCMA 1600 AM, WDNO 960 AM, WWNA 1340 AM, WLUZ 88.5 FM, W208AE 89.5 FM, WMLG 89.9 FM, WZCA 91.7 FM, W250CF 97.9 FM, W266CF 101.1 FM, W279BU 103.7 FM and W295BU 106.9 FM. On August 8, WBYM is off the air, working for the transmitter output of 4,000 watts, however it return on August 14. On August 16, WBYM once again went silent. The three-way swap and the cash-free transaction was completed on August 18, 2017. Due to the passage of Hurricane Maria, and the lack of electricity, On September 25, WBYM remained silent until June 20, 2018. WBYM resumed broadcasting that same day from its new transmitter facilities. On June 21, 2018, WBYM switched back to a Contemporary Christian format and also rechristened the Pura Palabra Radio branding.

== Sale to Pura Palabra Media Group ==
On July 18, 2018, La Mas Z Radio filed a request to transfer the license of WBYM from La Mas Z Radio to Pura Palabra Media Group (owner of Christian radio and television stations in Puerto Rico) for $1,000,000. According to the FCC filing, $600,000 will be paid with the transfer of the license, and four annual payments of $100,000. In the event of non-payment, the license will revert to La Mas Z Radio.

Upon closing, WBYM alongside WMLG in Guayanilla joined other stations owned by Pura Palabra Media Group, radio stations WLAZ in Kissimmee, Florida, WQML in Ceiba, W268BK in San Juan and Television station WUJA in Caguas, Puerto Rico. The sale was completed on September 12, 2018 and the consummation has been accepted on July 25, 2019.

== Construction permit ==
On March 15, 2007, the FCC granted the station a construction permit to upgrade its broadcast power to 10,000 watts during daytime and 5,000 watts at night. The transmitter site would also be re-located southwest to 18°21'00" N, 66°09'25"W. This permit expired on March 15, 2010.

On July 20, 2017, the FCC granted the station a construction permit to reduce its broadcast power to 4,000 watts during daytime and 740 watts at night. The permit was granted on August 14, 2017.

== Translator stations ==
Broadcast translators for WBYM
Call sign	Frequency	City of license	FID	ERP (W)	FCC info
W268BK	101.5 FM	San Juan, Puerto Rico	157307	250	LMS
W251DA	98.1 FM	Vega Baja, Puerto Rico	202075	250	LMS
