= Jonesboro Municipal Airport =

Airport in Arkansas, United States

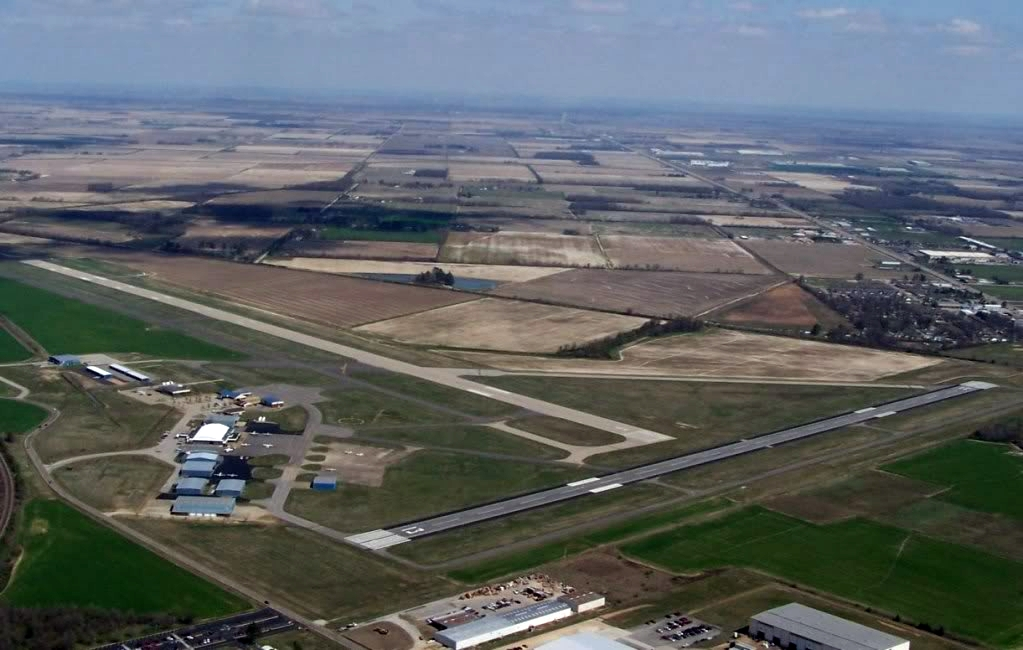
- IATA: JBR; ICAO: KJBR; FAA LID: JBR

Summary
- Airport type: Public
- Owner: City of Jonesboro
- Serves: Jonesboro, Arkansas
- Elevation AMSL: 262 ft (80 m)
- Coordinates: 35°49′54″N 090°38′47″W

Map
- Location of airport in Arkansas JBR (the United States)

Runways
Direction	Length		Surface
Direction	ft	m	Surface
5/23	6,200	1,890	Asphalt
13/31	4,099	1,249	Asphalt

Statistics
- Aircraft operations (2021): 20,156
- Based aircraft (2022): 122
- Departing passengers (12 months ending January 2022): 3,970
- Source: Federal Aviation Administration

Jonesboro Municipal Airport (IATA: JBR, ICAO: KJBR, FAA LID: JBR) is located three miles east of Jonesboro, in Craighead County, Arkansas. It is mostly used for general aviation and is served by Southern Airways Express through the federally subsidized Essential Air Service program.

The National Plan of Integrated Airport Systems for 2021–2025 categorized it as a non-primary commercial service airport.

The first airline flights were Ozark DC-3s in 1950–51; Ozark left in 1954–55. Trans-Texas DC-3s appeared in 1961, and Texas International's last Convair 600 left in 1976.

== Facilities ==
Jonesboro Municipal Airport covers 1,000 acres (405 ha) at an elevation of 262 feet (80 m). It has two runways: 5/23 is 6,200 by 150 feet (1,890 x 46 m) and 13/31 is 4,099 by 150 feet (1,249 x 46 m).

In the year ending March 31, 2021 the airport had 20,156 aircraft operations, an average of 55 per day: 87% general aviation, 13% air taxi and less than 1% military. In April 2022, there were 122 aircraft based at this airport: 69 single-engine, 32 multi-engine, 18 jet and 3 helicopter.

== Airlines and destinations ==
Southern Airways Express connects Jonesboro Airport to Nashville International Airport and St. Louis Lambert International Airport.

Essential Air Service was formerly provided by Mesa Airlines. In 2012 EAS service was initiated by Air Choice One, the contract runs through February 28, 2026. With the closure of Air Choice One in July 2022, service was transferred to Air Choice One's parent company Southern Airways Express. For a time in 2008 and 2009, the airport had no airline service.

== Statistics ==
Carrier shares: (September 2024 – August 2025)
Carrier	Passengers (arriving and departing)
Southern Airways Express	3,710(100%)

=== Top destinations ===
Busiest domestic routes from JBR (September 2024 – August 2025)
Rank	Airport	Passengers	Carriers
1	St. Louis, Missouri	1,120	Southern
2	Nashville, Tennessee	790	Southern

== 2020 tornado ==
On March 28, 2020, an EF3 tornado struck the airport, causing extensive damage. This included the destruction of a large metal building.

== See also ==
- List of airports in Arkansas
