= WUJA =

Television station in Caguas, Puerto Rico

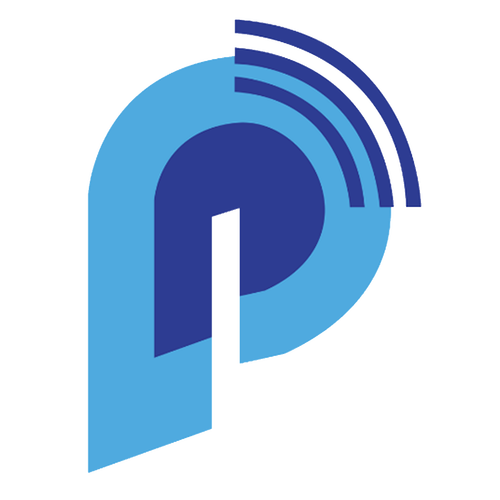
- Caguas–San Juan; Puerto Rico
- City: Caguas, Puerto Rico
- Channels: Digital: 24 (UHF), shared with WDWL; Virtual: 58
- Branding: Pura Palabra Television

Programming
- Affiliations: 58.1: Pura Palabra TV; 58.2: Religious

Ownership
- Owner: Pura Palabra Media Group; (Caguas Educational Television, Inc.)
- Sister stations: WBYM, WLAZ, WMLG, WQML

History
- Founded: July 25, 1983
- First air date: July 25, 1983
- Former channel numbers: Analog: 58 (UHF, 1983–2009); Digital: 48 (UHF, 2009-2018)
- Former affiliations: Independent (1983–1986); Fox (1986–1989)

Technical information
- Licensing authority: FCC
- Facility ID: 8156
- ERP: 120 kW
- HAAT: 314.9 m (1,033 ft)
- Transmitter coordinates: 18°16′40.8″N 66°6′31.6″W

Links
- Public license information: Public file; LMS
- Website: purapalabra.com

WUJA (channel 58), branded Pura Palabra Television, is a Spanish-language religious independent television station licensed to Caguas, Puerto Rico. Founded July 25, 1983, the station is owned by Pura Palabra Media Group, which is a subsidiary of Concilio Mision Cristiana Fuente de Agua Viva, through its licensee, Caguas Educational TV, Inc. WUJA shares transmitter facilities with Enlace-affiliated WDWL (channel 36) at Cerro La Marquesa in Aguas Buenas. The station maintains its studios located at Avenida Baldorioty de Castro in Carolina.

WUJA's programming was also seen on WQHA channel 50 in Aguada, after New Life Broadcasting sells the station in 2014.

== Technical information ==
=== Subchannels ===
Subchannels of WUJA and WDWL
License	Channel	Res.	Short name	Programming
WUJA	58.1	480i	WUJA-D1	Main WUJA programming (4:3)
WUJA	58.2	480i	WUJA-D2	Additional religious programming (4:3)
WUJA	58.3	480i	WUJA-D3	Additional religious programming (4:3)
WUJA	58.4	480i	WUJA-D4	Additional religious programming (4:3)
WDWL	36.1	480i	WDWL-DT	Enlace (4:3)

=== Analog-to-digital conversion ===
On June 12, 2009, WUJA signed off its analog signal and completed its move to digital.
