= Thompson Field =

Community in San Antonio, Texas, United States

Thompson is a primarily residential community in San Antonio, Texas. The neighborhood is 6 miles (9.7 km) west of Downtown San Antonio located between U.S. Highway 90 and Port San Antonio, with the Union Pacific railroad tracks and Lackland AFB servings as its east and west boundaries, respectively. Thompson is a collection of individual residential areas that were developed independently over a wide span of time. The area is the gateway to Port San Antonio and saw heaviest development during the 1940s, 50s and 60s. Many residents and families in the community were once stationed at or otherwise employed at the former Kelly AFB which gives the area its strong working-class and military tradition.

== History ==
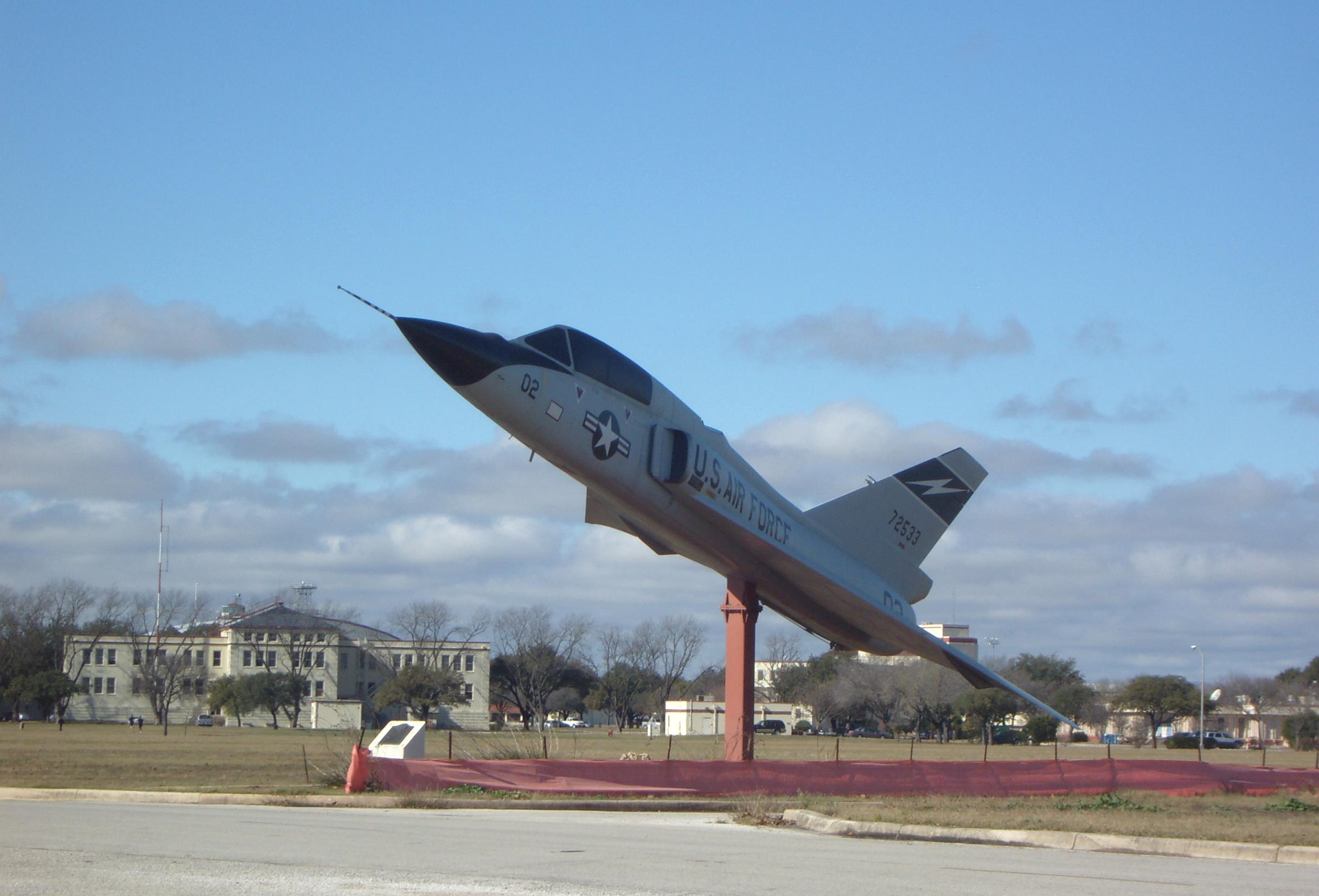
The area is marked by the history of the Air Force

The Thompson moniker originates from Thompson Place, the primary east–west thoroughfare.

The history of Thompson is fundamentally tied to the history of the former Kelly Air Force Base and now Port San Antonio. Kelly helped many of the areas residents by giving them higher-wage jobs that otherwise would have been inaccessible, allowing the area to achieve a slightly higher affluence than the surrounding area.

== Neighborhoods ==
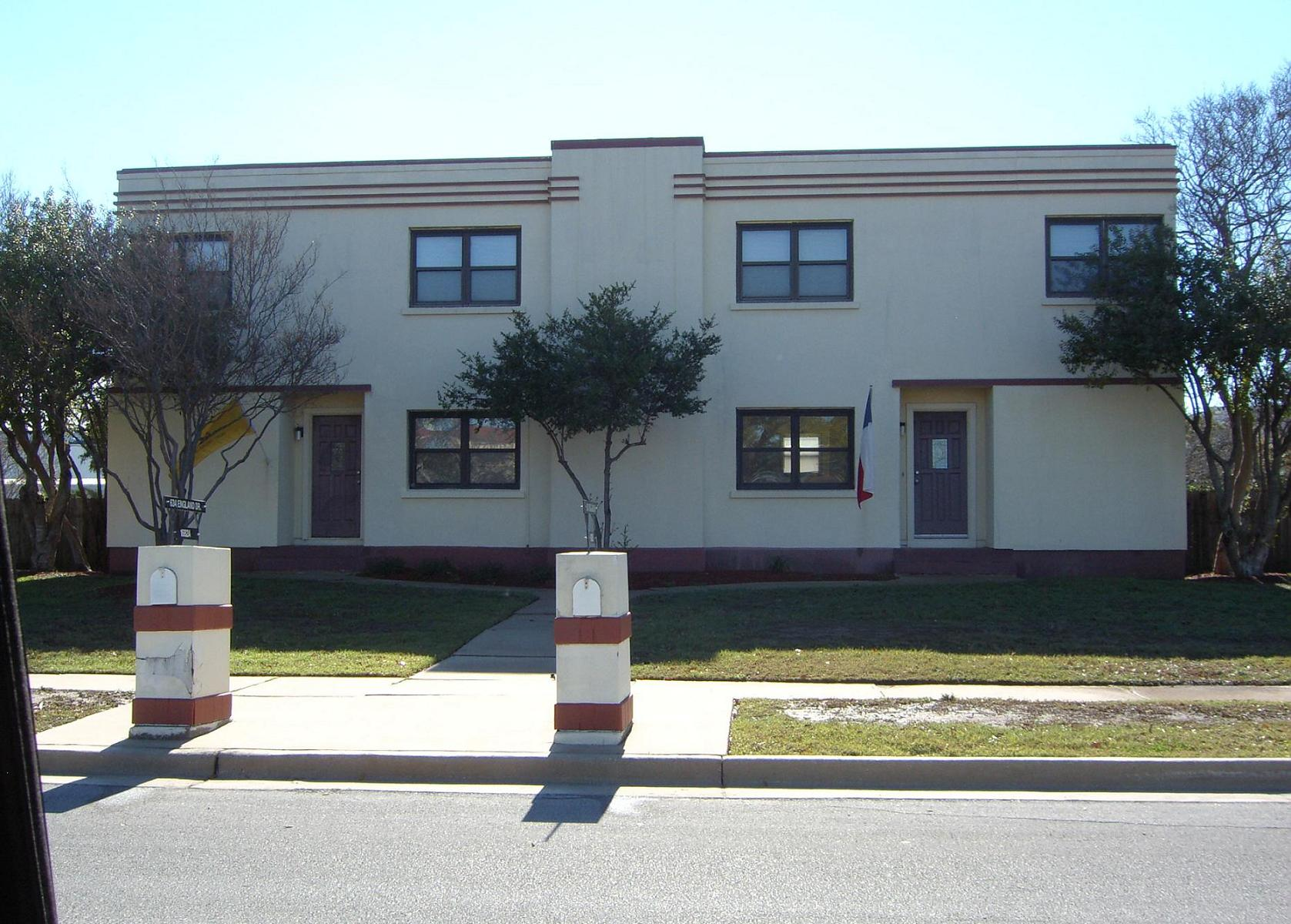
The area is filled with a variety of architectural styles

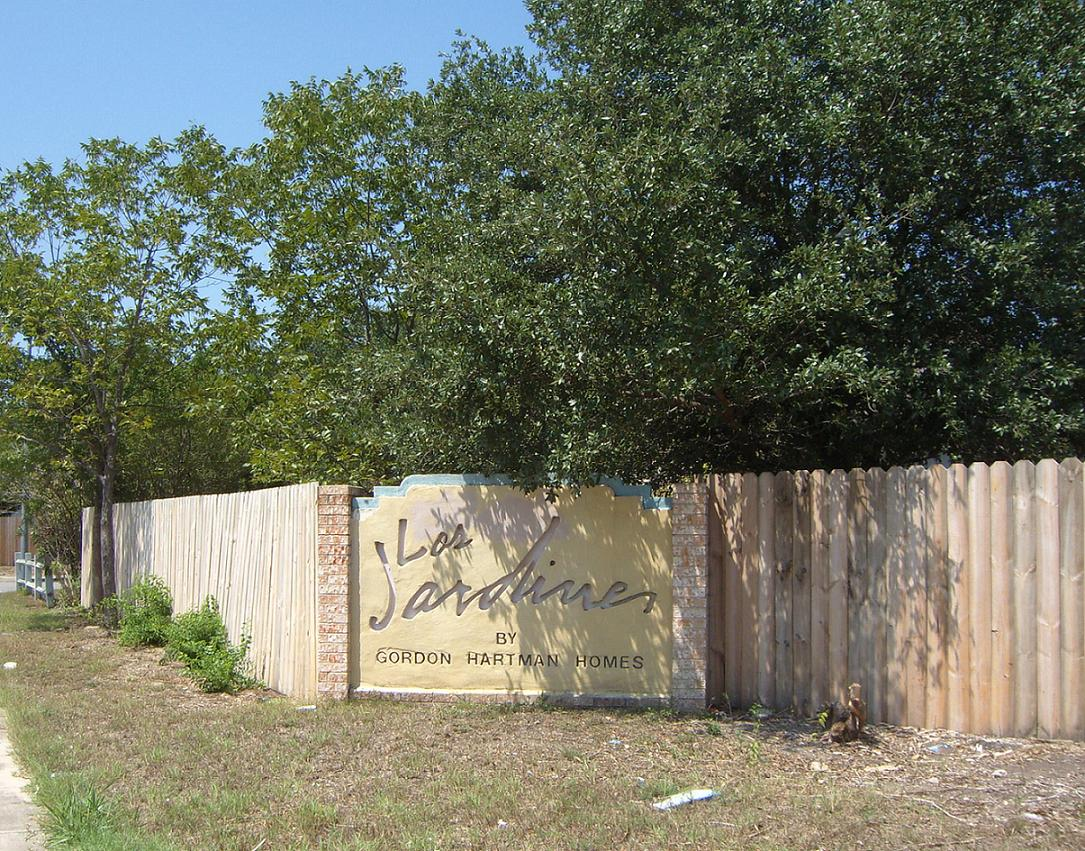
Los Jardines' famous yellow marquees.

The Thompson Field area outlined in red.

=== Single family neighborhoods ===
- Aiken Farms
- Brentwood Village
- The Enclave at Summerhill
- The Grotto
- Jamar Village - Located across Gen. McMullen from Kennedy High and Kennedy Park, the village sprung from the need for housing for the booming Kelly AFB during the 1960s. The neighborhood follows a more traditional grid layout with streets running east–west from Jamar Blvd to Imperial Blvd.
- Los Jardines - Developed in 1989 by Gordon Hartman Homes, the Los Jardines neighborhood is a collection of 84 garden homes. Residents are known as Jardineros, the Spanish word for gardener.
- Jesusita - Developed in 1997 the Jesusita neighborhood was the last multiple-home development in Thompson Field.
- Menefee
- Parkers Garden
- Wescott Place

=== Apartment living ===
In addition to Billy Mitchell, the Thompson community offers several rental options for those interested in apartment living. Complexes include Darby Place, The Diplomat Apartments, Kennedy Arms, Roselawn Apartments, Thompson Place Apartments and Winston Square.

The Colonel J. George Cisneros Apartments are an assisted living community operated by the San Antonio Housing Authority.

== Education ==
=== Day care ===
The community is served by several small, independent day care centers.

=== Primary education ===
Approximately 90% of Thompson is served by the Edgewood Independent School District. The northeastern tip is serviced by the San Antonio Independent School District .

The area is home to John F. Kennedy High School, Brentwood Middle School and Norman Winston Elementary, all Edgewood schools. Edgewood's Frank Mata Memorial Stadium is located in Thompson, adjacent to Kennedy High School. The Stadium serves as the home of Kennedy's Mighty Rocket Football team and is used for various other athletic and non-athletic events throughout the year.

The community is also home to St. John Berchmans School. The school is a parochial, coed, Catholic elementary functioning under the auspices of St. John Berchmans Catholic Church. School and church alike are operated by the Archdiocese of San Antonio. The school serves PK-8 and is one of the largest elementary schools operated by the Archdiocese.

=== Colleges ===
Immediately south of the neighborhood, across General Hudnell, is St. Philips College-Southwest Campus. The campus serves a vital role as the city's primary center for technical and industrial education. The campus serves approximately 2,000 students each semester and provides instruction and training for careers in high-skill, high-wage fields such as aviation technology, railroad operations and architectural drafting. Southwest Campus serves as a center linking welfare recipients and displaced workers to area opportunities, including those available with employers at Port San Antonio. The Southwest Campus aids in creating a much-needed, high skilled workforce for the area.

== Culture and life ==
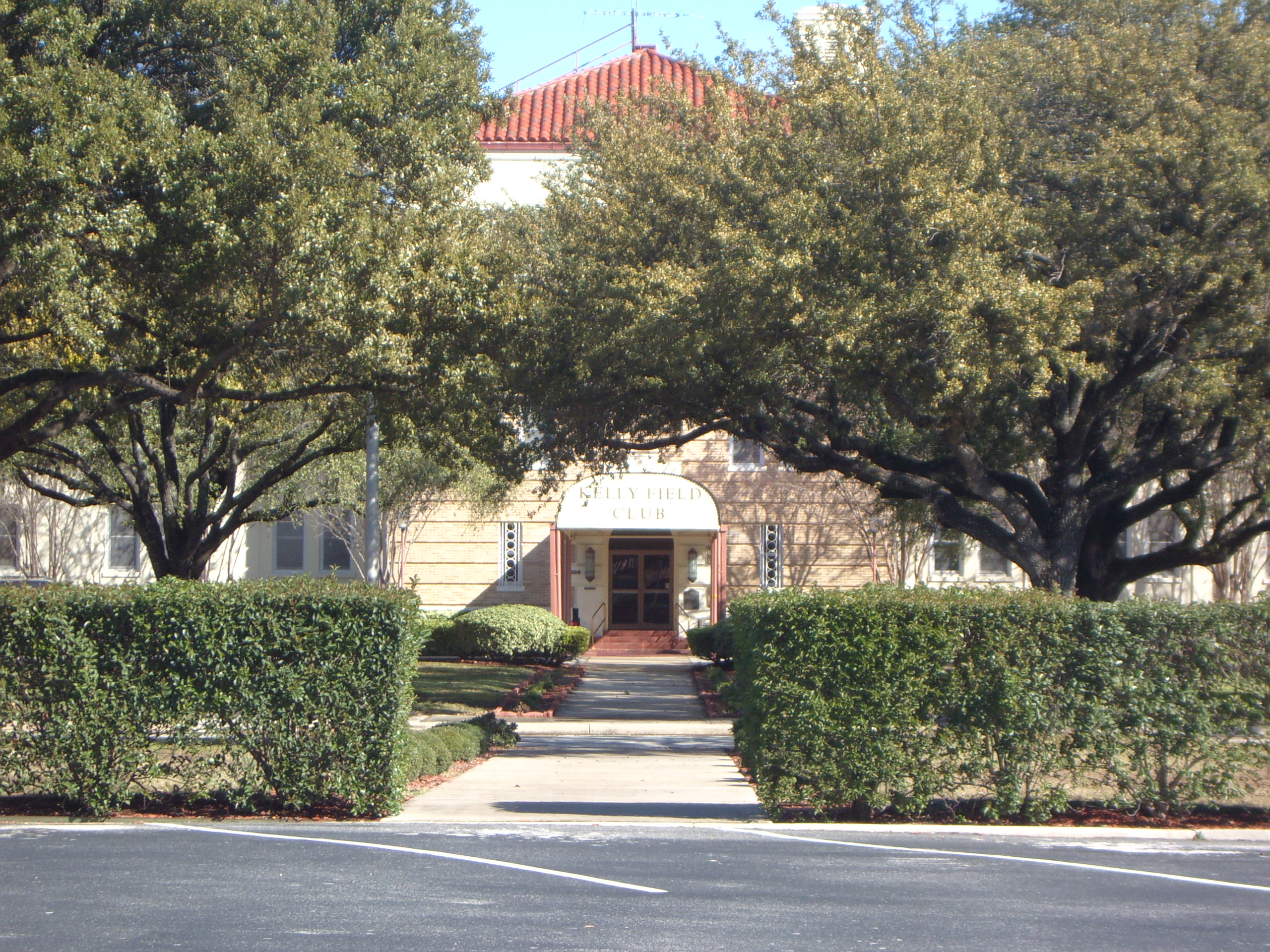
The Kelly Field Club is a gathering place for the military, young and old.

The community is serviced by several national food chains as well as several local, independent restaurants.

Much as with the rest of Texas, Thompson residents have a strong affinity for high school football. During the high school football season residents will regularly fill Mata Stadium on Friday and Saturday nights to watch Kennedy's football team take on opponents from across the San Antonio region.

== Parks and Recreational Space ==
- Kennedy Park

A 35.8-acre (145,000 m^{2}) public park at the intersection of Roselawn Avenue and South General McMullen Drive. The park includes the Kennedy Softball Complex which has five fields used for tournament and league play. The park also includes a pool, several pavilions basketball and tennis courts, and half a mile of hard-surface walking trails.

- Lindbergh Park

Located at the intersection of Duncan Drive and Crickett Drive on the grounds of Port San Antonio.

- Mateo Camargo Park

Popular among residents for events ranging from large birthday parties to music festivals and car shows. The 45-acre (180,000 m^{2}) park is located along the Highway 90 Access Road, just west of the Callaghan intersection.

- Roselawn Memorial Park

The cemetery has been renamed San Fernando Catholic Cemetery No.3 and currently functions under the Archdiocese of San Antonio.

- Port San Antonio

Thanks to the numerous on base facilities maintained for the military, Port San Antonio is littered with numerous small recreational areas including ball fields, running tracks and pavilions.

== Economy ==
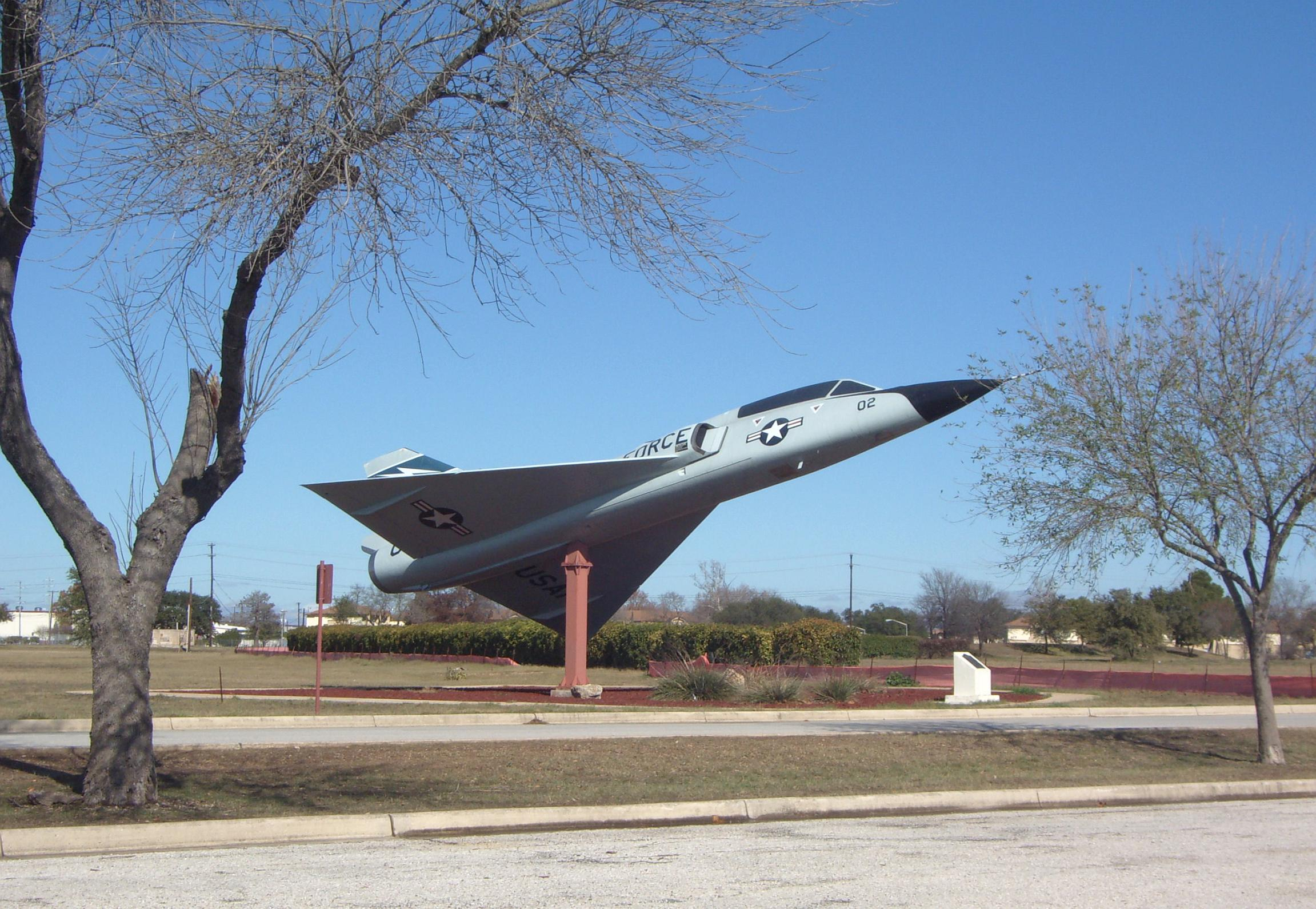
The Air Force is still a major part of the area economy

Employers in the area include: Boeing, Lockheed Martin, EG&G, General Electric and Gore Design.

As the area was developed before the spread of the suburban strip-mall, Thompson Field lacks the large stripcenters common in other parts of the city. Only two strip centers currently exist in the community, the rest of the area is full of small, stand-alone businesses. Kelly Center, a small strip area on Billy Mitchell Blvd, once full of thriving local businesses has seen its fortunes go south with the exodus of workers from Kelly.

== Transportation ==
The community is home to an office of the Texas Department of Public Safety at the intersection of South Gen. McMullen and Weir Ave.

The proposed Austin–San Antonio Commuter Rail will terminate with a station south of the neighborhood at Port San Antonio.

== Demographics ==
The area population was approximately 8,000 as of the 2000 Census. The median age is 29 and approximately 10.1% of the population holds a college degree.

Approximately 89.9% of area residents are native born and 10.1% being of foreign origin. Of those born outside the United States approximately 90% were born in Latin America.

The median household income was $23,114 and the median family income was $25,754. The median homevalue was $47,000.
