= John Garza =

American politician

John Vincent Garza

Texas State Representative for District 117 (Bexar County)
- In office January 2011 – January 2013
- Preceded by: David McQuade Leibowitz
- Succeeded by: Philip Cortez

Personal details
- Born: March 13, 1955 (age 71) Herlong, Lassen County; California, US
- Party: Republican
- Spouse: Debora A. Garza
- Children: John Zachariah, Jacqueline, Isaiah, Rebekah, and Hannah
- Education: John F. Kennedy High School; University of Denver

John Vincent Garza (born March 13, 1955, in Herlong, California) is a Republican former one-term member of the Texas House of Representatives from District 117 in Bexar County, Texas. Garza has been employed in housing development and sales for most of his working career.

Garza was named "Freshman Legislator of the Year" by the Hispanic Republican Conference for the 82nd Legislature in 2011.

== Background ==
Garza was born into the military family of retired United States Air Force Staff Sergeant Arthur and Maria D. Garza and traveled extensively in his early years. In 1967, the family returned to its Westside San Antonio home.

Garza graduated in 1973 from John F. Kennedy High School in the Edgewood Independent School District of Bexar County. He attended the University of Denver in Denver, Colorado, from which he received his bachelor's degree in Mass Communication in 1977. He married Debra A. Garza in 1980 and has reared five children, John Zachariah, Jacqueline, Isaiah, Rebekah and Hannah.

Garza has had a lengthy career in housing and real estate; he has held several executive positions in his business and sales career which dates back to the 1980s.

== District 117 ==
Garza's District 117 is among the most rapidly growing parts of Bexar County. It encompasses the far west and southwest portions of Bexar County, including the cities of San Antonio, Helotes, Von Ormy, Lytle, and the unincorporated community of Macdona. The district also includes Lackland Air Force Base, University of Texas at San Antonio, Texas A&M University–San Antonio, and Palo Alto College.

Garza was defeated in the 2012 general election after only one term in office by the Democrat Philip Cortez, who regains this seat in 2017 after a two-year absence. Garza subsequently failed in a comeback attempt in the March 4, 2014, Republican primary for House District 117. He lost the nomination to Rick Galindo, a San Antonio businessman who received 2,372 votes (64.6 percent) to Garza's 1,300 votes (35.4 percent). Galindo then narrowly unseated Cortez in the November 4 general election. In 2016, Cortez regained the position by defeating Galindo.

== Election history ==
2010 House District 117 Republican Primary
Party	Candidate	Votes	%	±%
Republican	John V. Garza	3,805	100	

2010 House District 117 Elections
Party	Candidate	Votes	%	±%
Republican	John V. Garza	14,684	51.87	
Democratic	David McQuade Leibowitz	13,625	48.13	

== 82nd Texas Legislature ==
Garza was one of forty freshmen legislators in the 82nd Texas Legislature. He was one of six Hispanic Republicans serving in the House from 2011 to 2013 and was a founding member of the House Hispanic Republican Conference.

Garza served on the House committees of Business and Industry and Land and Resource Management.

Garza in his one term in office authored or co-authored more than thirty-five bills dealing primarily with property tax reform, rural and suburban water rights, election integrity, greater accountability in government, and home owner association reform.

== Unsuccessful race for county commissioner ==
In the general election held on November 8, 2016, Garza ran unsuccessfully for the Bexar County Precinct 1 commissioner's post. He was defeated by the incumbent Democrat Sergio "Chico" Rodriguez, a brother of former U.S. Representative Ciro Rodriguez of Texas's 23rd congressional district.

Texas House of Representatives
Preceded by David McQuade Leibowitz	Texas State Representative for District 117 (Bexar County); John Vincent Garza; 2011–2013	Succeeded by Philip Cortez
