= Effects of Hurricane Maria in Puerto Rico =

Hurricane Maria
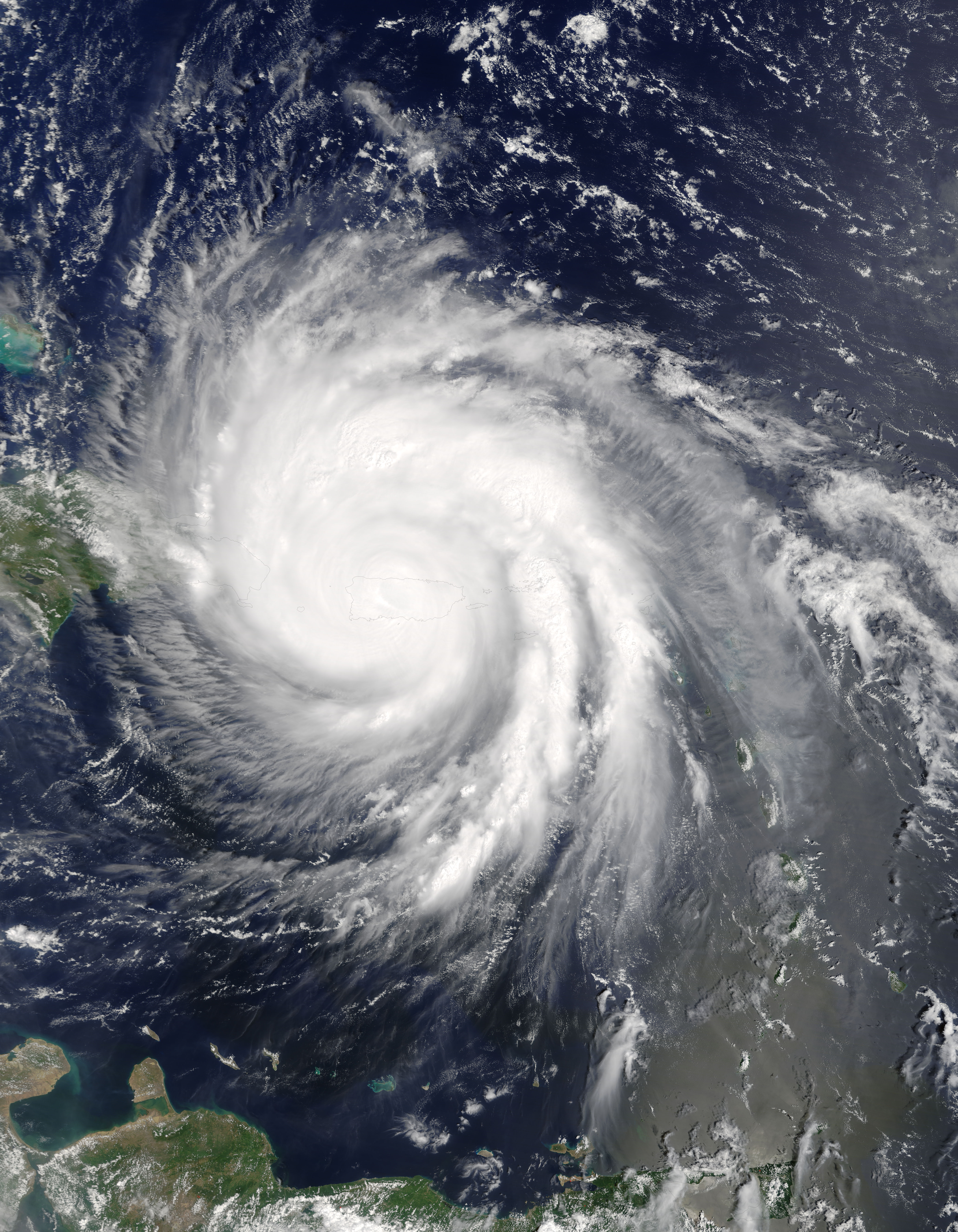
- Hurricane Maria over Puerto Rico on September 20

Meteorological history
- Duration: September 19–21, 2017

Category 4 major hurricane
- 1-minute sustained (SSHWS/NWS)
- Highest winds: 155 mph (250 km/h)
- Lowest pressure: 920 mbar (hPa); 27.17 inHg

Overall effects
- Fatalities: 2,982 (estimated)
- Damage: $90 billion (2017 USD)
- Areas affected: Puerto Rico
- Part of the 2017 Atlantic hurricane season
- History • Meteorological history Effects; U.S territory • Puerto Rico • Death toll controversy Other wikis • Commons: Maria images

Between September 19–21, 2017, Hurricane Maria devastated the island of Puerto Rico, leaving a major humanitarian crisis. Maria was the strongest storm to impact the island in nearly 90 years. Prior to reaching Puerto Rico, Maria became a Category 5 hurricane. It was downgraded to a high-end Category 4 hurricane by the time it made landfall on September 20. It brought a large storm surge, heavy rains, and wind gusts well above 100 mph (160 km/h). It flattened neighborhoods, crippled the island's power grid, and caused an estimated 2,982 fatalities and US$90 billion in damage.

== Background ==
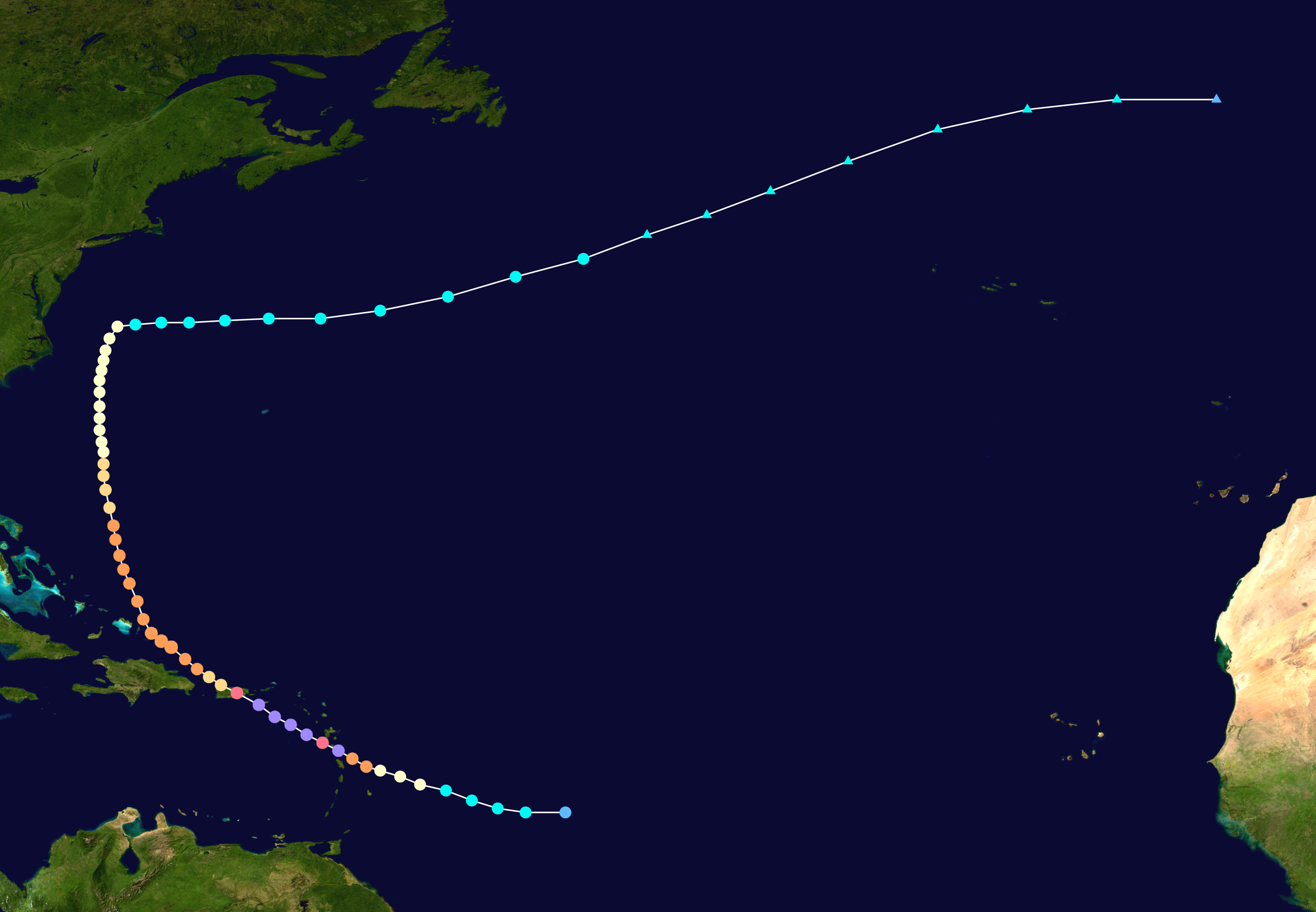
Map plotting the storm's track and intensity, according to the Saffir–Simpson scale Map key Saffir–Simpson scale Tropical depression (≤38 mph, ≤62 km/h) Tropical storm (39–73 mph, 63–118 km/h) Category 1 (74–95 mph, 119–153 km/h) Category 2 (96–110 mph, 154–177 km/h) Category 3 (111–129 mph, 178–208 km/h) Category 4 (130–156 mph, 209–251 km/h) Category 5 (≥157 mph, ≥252 km/h) Unknown Storm type Tropical cyclone Subtropical cyclone Extratropical cyclone, remnant low, tropical disturbance, or monsoon depression

=== Before landfall ===
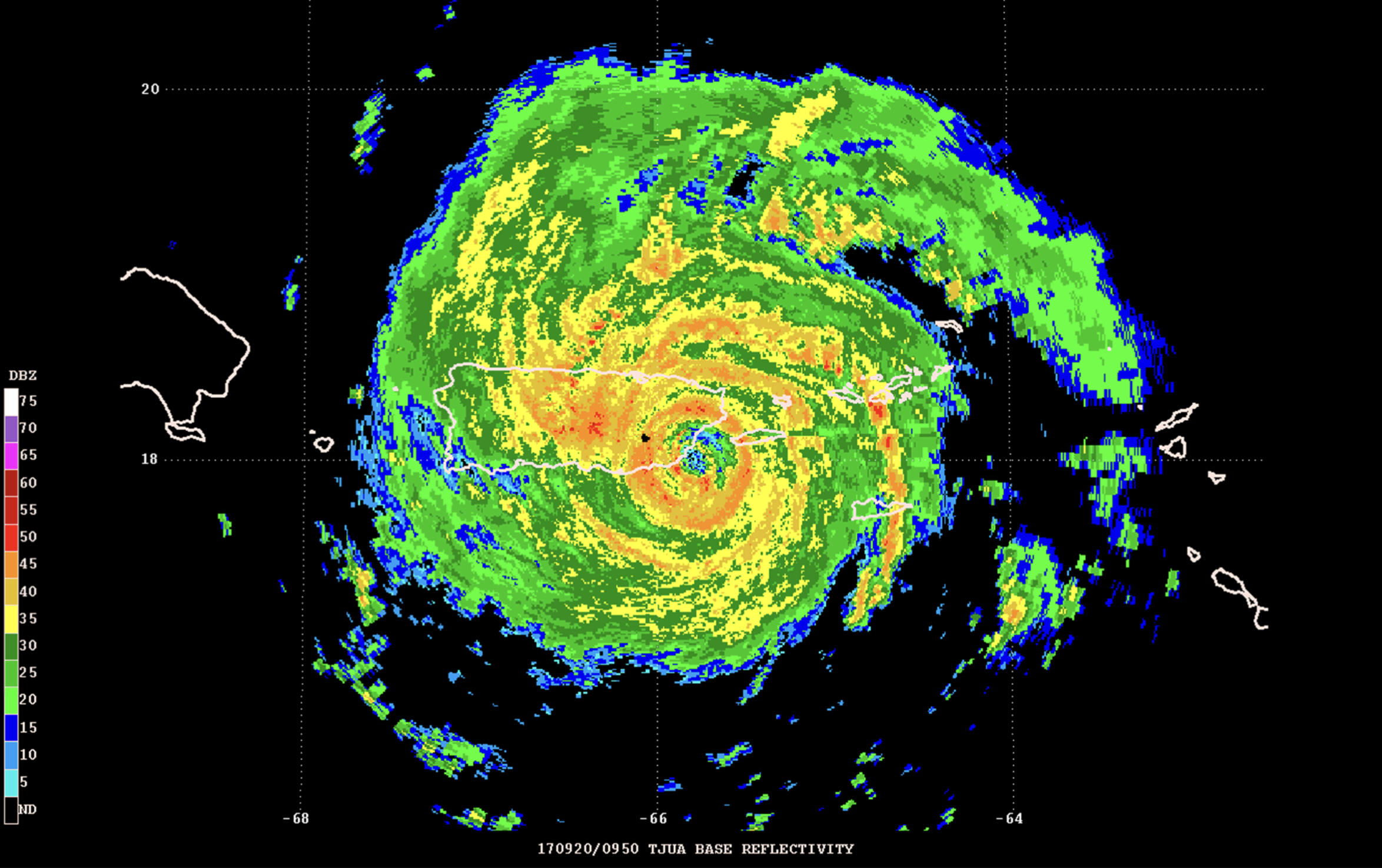
Radar image of Hurricane Maria at 0950 UTC September 20, just before landfall. This was the last image from the radar before it was destroyed.

Maria began as a tropical depression on September 16, about 665 miles (1,070 km) east of Barbados. Conditions favorable for hurricane activity allowed the storm to strengthen throughout the day, and a convective burst propelled Maria to hurricane strength late on September 17. Over the next 24 hours, Maria explosively strengthened to Category 5 status 15 miles (24 km) east-southeast of Dominica, before making landfall there early on September 19. Despite some weakening, Maria reached peak intensity early on September 20 while roughly 30 miles (48 km) south of St. Croix, with maximum sustained winds of 175 mph (282 km/h) and a minimum central pressure of 908 mbar (26.8 inHg).

Infrared satellite loop of Maria passing south of St. Croix, Vieques, and making landfall on September 20

Maria made its closest approach to St. Croix around 05:00 UTC on September 20. It passed within 20 miles (32 km) of the island; the storm's outer eyewall lashed the island, but the inner eyewall remained offshore. Hours later, the outer eyewall hit Vieques, an island off of Puerto Rico's eastern coast. By this time, an eyewall replacement cycle had caused Maria to weaken to Category 4 strength. Maria made landfall, just south of Yabucoa, around 10:15 UTC, with sustained winds of 155 mph (249 km/h) and a central pressure of 920 mbar (27 inHg). It was the second-strongest recorded hurricane to hit the island, surpassed only by the 1928 San Felipe Segundo hurricane, the only Category 5 storm to have struck Puerto Rico.

=== Infrastructure and recession ===
The Puerto Rico Electric Power Authority (PREPA), had $9 billion in debt before the hurricane. Aging infrastructure across the island left the grid susceptible to storm damage; the median age of PREPA power plants was 44 years. The company's safety record was inadequate. Local newspapers frequently described poor maintenance and outdated controls.

In the decade preceding Maria, Puerto Rico suffered from financial decline and crippling debt from poor fiscal management. Early in 2017, the territory filed for bankruptcy as its public debt reached $74 billion. A change in taxation policy prompted an exodus of successful businesses and reduced tax revenue. Unemployment rates rose to 45%.

== Preparations ==
Forecasts of Hurricane Maria's track from the National Hurricane Center proved to be "highly accurate", with the agency's second advisory—issued on September 16—predicting it would strike Puerto Rico as a major hurricane.

Evacuation orders were issued in advance of Maria, and officials announced that 450 shelters would open on the afternoon of September 18. As of September 19, at least 2,000 people had sought shelter.

Hospitals had emergency preparedness protocols in place to ensure safe staffing levels during storms. Residency programs organized teams and faculty members who would stay at the hospitals until the emergency passed. Food and sleeping quarters were prepared, and some faculty family members were allowed to shelter there.

The FEMA internal after-action report outlined preparation problems. This included emergency supply warehouses that housed cots and tarps that were nearly empty. FEMA also reported that it was understaffed, relying on staff who were unqualified for such disaster work. Staff and supplies had been sent to other places at the time. FEMA had only 12,000 tarps at the time of the storm, inadequate given that nearly half a million houses were destroyed. The report also found that the most recent disaster planning assessment that FEMA had run for Puerto Rico was in 2012, and "'underestimated the actual requirements of 2017' In particular, the plans 'did not address insufficiently maintained infrastructure (e.g., the electrical grid... financial liquidity challenges' facing the Puerto Rican government."

== Impact ==
Wettest tropical cyclones and their remnants in Puerto Rico Highest-known totals
Precipitation			Storm	Location	Ref.
Rank	mm	in	Storm	Location	Ref.
1	1,058.7	41.68	Fifteen 1970	Jayuya 1 SE	
2	962.7	37.90	Maria 2017	Caguas	
3	845.6	33.29	Eloise 1975	Dos Bocas	
4	822.9	32.40	Fiona 2022	Marueno	
5	804.4	31.67	Isabel 1985	Toro Negro Forest	
6	775.0	30.51	Georges 1998	Jayuya	
7	751.8	29.60	San Felipe II 1928	Adjuntas	
8	662.2	26.07	Hazel 1954	Toro Negro Tunnel	
9	652.5	25.69	Klaus 1984	Guavate Camp	
10	596.4	23.48	Hortense 1996	Cayey 1 NW	

Maria made landfall on Wednesday, September 20. Sustained winds of 64 mph (103 km/h), with gusts up to 113 mph (182 km/h), were reported in San Juan shortly before landfall. After landfall, gusts of 109 mph (175 km/h) were reported at Yabucoa Harbor, and gusts of 118 mph (190 km/h) at Camp Santiago. A minimum barometric pressure reading of 926.6 mbar (27.36 inHg) was reported in Yabucoa. Heavy rainfall occurred throughout the territory, peaking at 37.9 in (960 mm) in Caguas. Widespread flooding, waist-deep in some areas, affected San Juan, and numerous structures lost their roofs. San Juan's coastal La Perla neighborhood was largely destroyed. Cataño saw extensive damage, while the Juana Matos neighborhood estimated to be 80% destroyed. Luis Muñoz Marín International Airport, San Juan's primary airport, reopened on September 22.

Extensive damage occurred to hundreds of thousands of buildings due to the high winds, heavy rainfall, storm surge, wave action and landslides. Governor Ricardo Rosselló estimated that over 300,000 homes had been destroyed and many more damaged. Other estimates included 166,000 residential buildings damaged or destroyed and 472,000 housing units destroyed or with major damage.

Storm surge inundation as high as 9 ft (2.7 m) above ground level occurred along the southeastern coast, and flash flooding stemming from floodgate releases at La Plata Lake Dam converged on the town of Toa Baja, trapping thousands of residents. Survivors stated that flood waters rose at least 6 ft (1.8 m) in 30 minutes, reaching a depth of 15 ft (4.6 m) in some areas. More than 2,000 people were rescued by the military there. At least eight people died while many were missing.

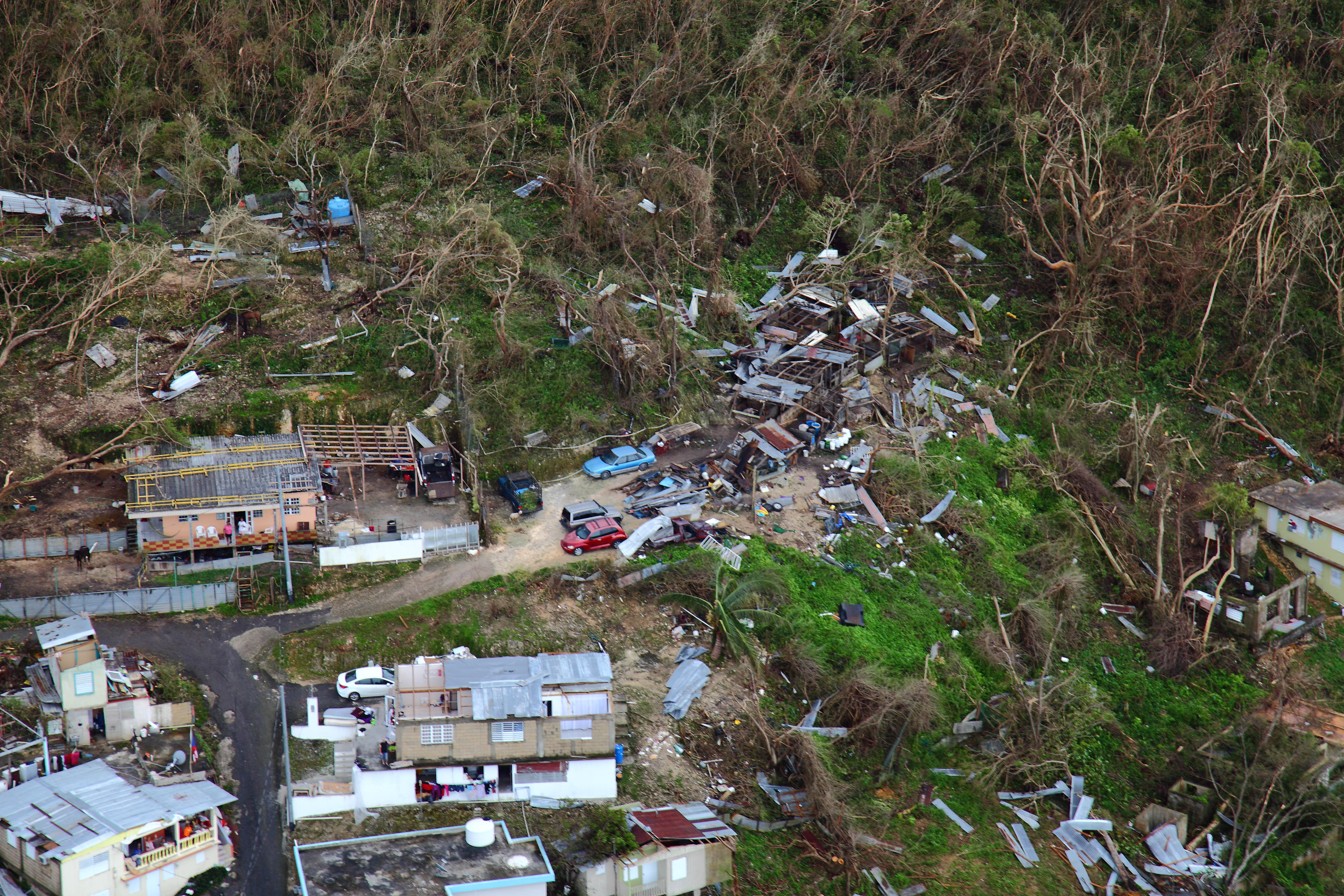
Thousands of homes suffered varying degrees of damage while large swaths of vegetation were shredded by the hurricane's violent winds.

The hurricane devastated the power grid, leaving all 3.4 million residents without electricity. Communication networks were crippled. Ninety-five percent of cell networks were down with 48 of the island's 78 counties' networks rendered inoperable. Eighty-five percent of above-ground phone and internet cables were knocked out. Only one radio station, WAPA 680 AM, remained on-air through the storm.

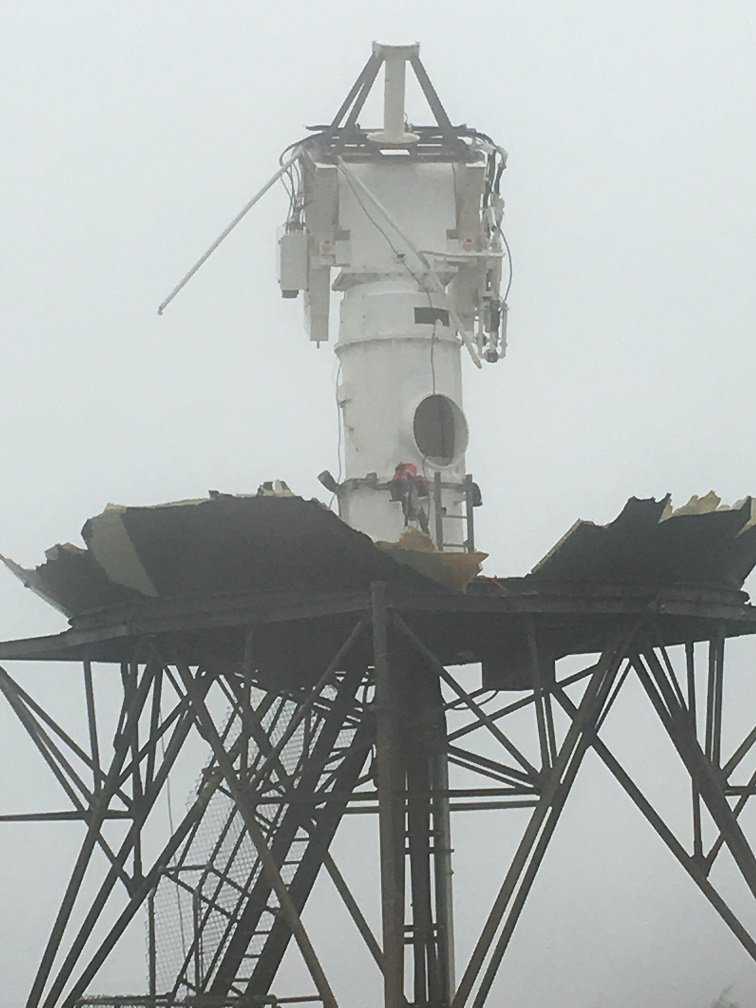
NEXRAD radar destroyed by Maria

The NEXRAD Doppler weather radar was destroyed. The radome, which covers the radar antenna, was destroyed in the 130 mph (210 km/h) winds, and the 30 ft (9.1 m) wide radar dish was blown from the pedestal (which remained intact). The radar is located at an elevation of 2,800 ft (850 m) and the anemometer at the site measured winds of about 145 mph (233 km/h) before communications broke, likely 20 percent higher than what was seen at sea level, possibly reaching Category 5 levels..

Vieques suffered similar damage. Communications were largely lost. Property damage was widespread and many structures were leveled. The remaining structures on the island of Culebra were vulnerable to Maria's winds having recently experienced major damage due to Hurricane Irma. Many wooden houses were lost, along with blown-off roofs and sunken boats.

Hurricane Maria at Coast Guard Sector San Juan

The recreational boat Ferrel, carrying a family of four, issued a distress signal while battling 20 ft (6.1 m) waters and 115 mph (185 km/h) winds on September 20. Communications with the vessel were lost near Vieques on September 20. The United States Coast Guard, United States Navy, and British Royal Navy conducted search-and-rescue operations utilizing an HC-130 aircraft, a fast response cutter, USS Kearsarge, RFA Mounts Bay and Navy helicopters. On September 21, the mother and her two children were rescued; the father drowned inside the capsized ship.

Maria's Category 4 winds broke a 96-foot (29 m) line feed antenna at Arecibo Observatory. It fell 500 feet (150 m), puncturing the dish below and greatly reducing its functionality until repairs could be made.

Maria caused many factories to close, including factories that made and exported intravenous infusion bags. This led to a shortage of bags on the mainland, exacerbating an H3N2 outbreak that killed at least 30 children.

=== Damage estimates and economic impact ===
Rosselló estimated that Maria caused at least US$ 90 billion in damage, far more than the $8B from Hurricane Georges.Approximately 80% of the territory's agriculture was destroyed; losses were estimated at $780 million. Plantain, banana and coffee farms were severely damaged; more than 90% of poultry was destroyed.

=== Psychological impacts ===
Many people were not equipped to handle the damage overcome by hopelessness and helplessness. Food and potable water were hard to come by even months after the storm. Blackouts envelopedthe island, including at hospitals. Patients noted that services were lmited, while healthcare providers called out the Puerto Rican government. New and expectant mothers experienced greater health issues in an environment that allowed pathogens and environmental toxins to thrive.

Suicide rates spiked, especially among the elderly. Cases of depression increased while post-traumatic stress disorder was common. The number of indirect deaths greatly surpassed that of direct deaths, also surpassing Hurricanes Harvey and Irma, which made landfall around the same time.

Anxiety was high among survivors, led by fear of health issues and injuries. On the western side of the island, it was rumored that water was pumped by AAA to homes from Guajataca reservoir. The damage and rumors that the lake was going to run dry increased anxiety levels. When water service finally returned, it was unreliable and many depended on bottled water for long periods.

=== Gender-based violence ===
The long lines to access vital resources left women vulnerable to sexual harassment, while the lack of government resources for employment and housing made it difficult for women facing domestic abuse to escape, increasing the incidence of intimate partner violence. In 2018, the intimate partner violence rate more than doubled to 1.7 per 100,000 women, with a record 23 IPV murder victims, compared to a rate of only 0.77 in 2017.

== Mortality ==
Reported Deaths by Month and Year
	2017	2016	2015
September	2,838	2,366	2,242
October	2,119	2,353	2,379
Total (September and October)	4,957	4,719	4,621

In the following months, media outlets, politicians, and investigative journalists questioned the official death toll of 64. A two-week investigation in November 2017 by CNN of 112 funeral homes—approximately half of the island—reported 499 hurricane-related deaths between September 20 and October 19. Funeral homes became so overwhelmed by the number of bodies that in one instance a facility director in Vega Alta died from a stress-induced heart attack. Scientists Alexis Santos and Jeffrey Howard estimated the death toll to be 1,085 by the end of November 2017. They utilized average monthly deaths and the "excess" fatalities immediately following. The value only included reported deaths. By the end of November, the Puerto Rican government maintained that their report of 55 fatalities was the most accurate. The New York Times indicated an increase of 1,052 fatalities in the 42 days following Maria compared to previous years. Significant spikes in death reports compared to the two preceding Septembers included sepsis (+47%), pneumonia (+45%), emphysema (+43%), diabetes (+31%), and Alzheimer's and Parkinson's (+23%). Robert Anderson at the National Center for Health Statistics reported that the increase in monthly fatalities was statistically significant.

By mid-December Governor Rossello ordered a recount and new analysis of the official death toll. On August 28, 2018, the Government of Puerto Rico revised the official death toll to be 2,975 people, ranking Maria as one of the deadliest hurricanes in United States history. The official estimate is based on a study commissioned by the governor.

== Aftermath ==
There's a humanitarian emergency here in Puerto Rico.... This is an event without precedent.

— Ricardo Rosselló, Governor of Puerto Rico

=== Infrastructure and utilities ===
As of September 26, 95% of the island was without power, less than half the population had tap water, and 95% of the island had no cell phone service. One month after the hurricane, 88% of the island was without power (about 3 million people), 29% lacked tap water (about 1 million people), and 40% of the island had no cell service. Three months later, 45% of Puerto Ricans still had no power, affecting over 1.5 million people.

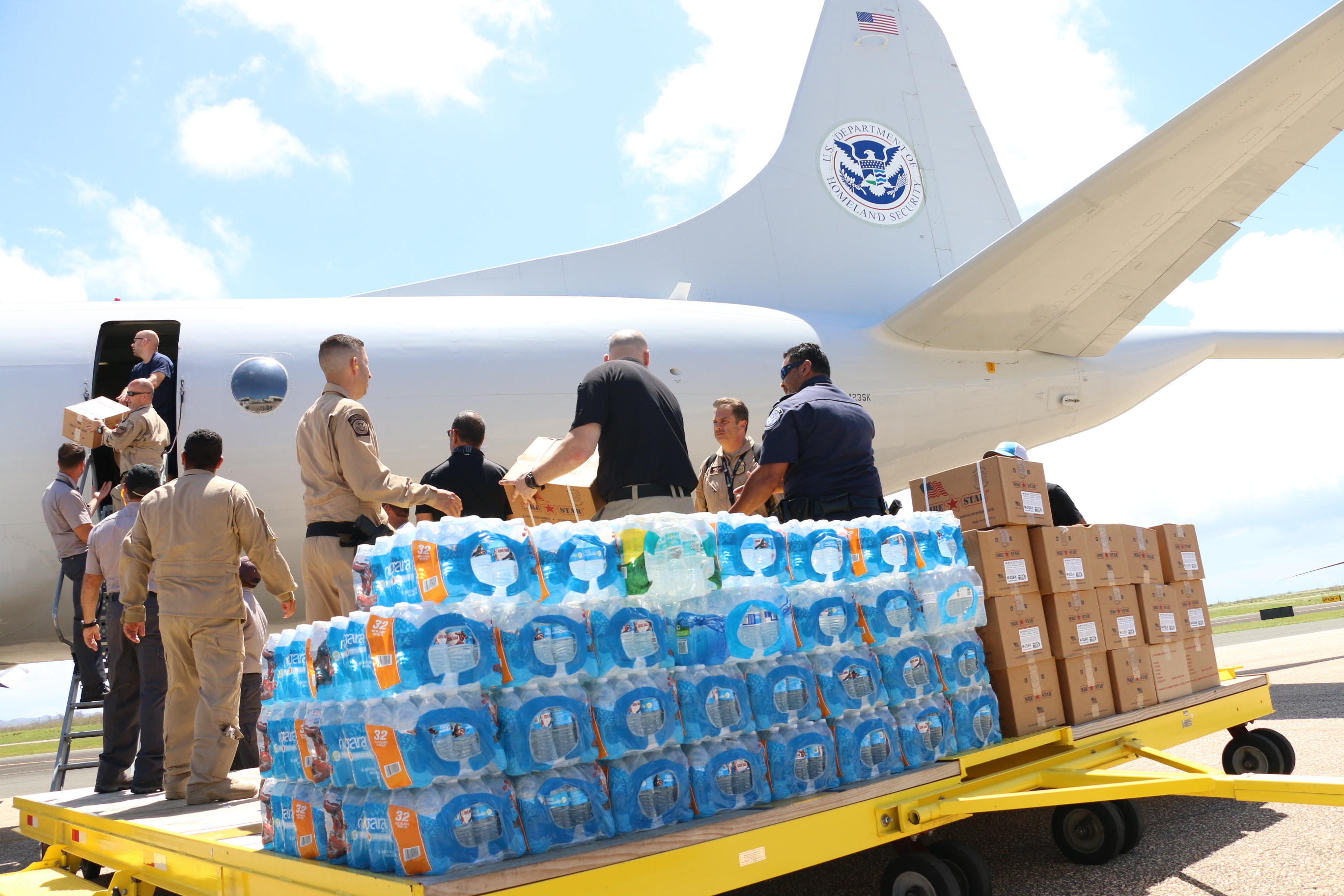
Relief supplies unloaded by U.S. Customs and Border Protection agents

=== Relief efforts ===
Puerto Rico was declared a Federal Disaster Zone. Two weeks after the hurricane, international relief organization Oxfam intervened on American soil for the first time since Hurricane Katrina in 2005.

One month after the hurricane, all hospitals were open, but most were stuck on backup generators that provided limited power. About half of sewage treatment plants on the island were shuttered. FEMA reported 60,000 homes needed roofing help, and had distributed 38,000 roofing tarps. Only 392 miles of Puerto Rico's 5,073 miles of road were open. A month later, some towns continued to be isolated and delivery of relief supplies including food and water were hampered—helicopters were the only alternative.

The Guajataca Dam was structurally damaged, and on September 22, the National Weather Service issued a flash flood emergency for parts of the area in response. Tens of thousands of people were ordered to evacuate the area, with about 70,000 at risk.

FEMA planned to open an air bridge with three to four aircraft carrying essential supplies to the island daily starting on September 22. Beyond flights involving the relief effort, limited commercial traffic resumed at Luis Muñoz Marín International Airport on September 22 under primitive conditions. As of October 3, 39 commercial flights per day departed Puerto Rican airports, about a quarter of the normal number. The territory's government contracted 56 small companies to assist in restoring power. Eight FEMA Urban Search & Rescue (US&R) teams were deployed to assist in rescue efforts.

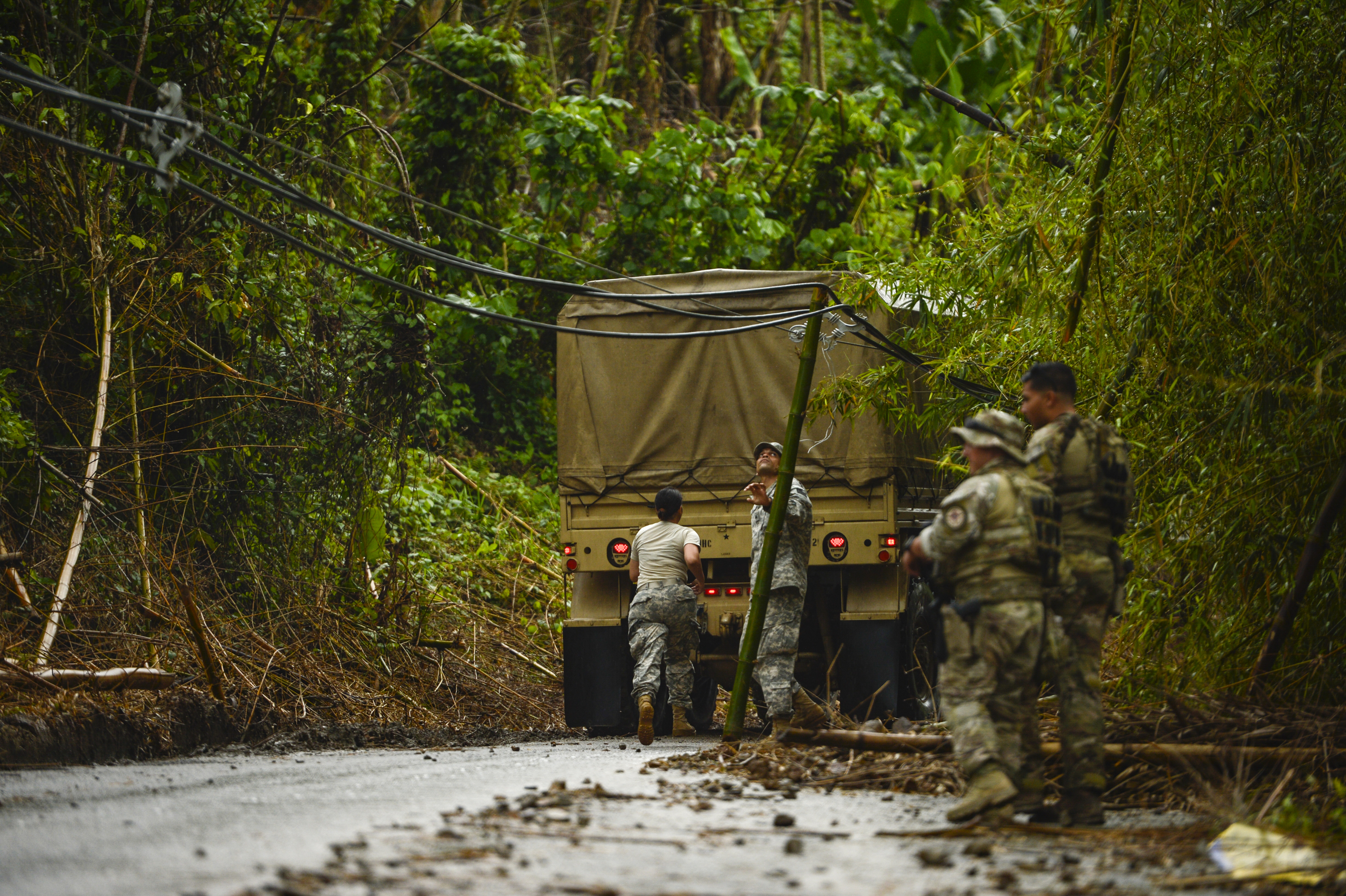
Debris-clogged roads added to logistical challenges faced by rescue and relief crews.

On September 24, the amphibious assault ship USS Kearsarge and the dock landing ship USS Oak Hill along with 2,400 marines of the 26th Marine Expeditionary Unit arrived to assist in relief efforts. By September 24, 13 United States Coast Guard ships were deployed around Puerto Rico assisting in relief and restoration efforts:

- National Security Cutter USCGC James
- medium endurance cutters USCGC Diligence, USCGC Forward, USCGC Venturous, and USCGC Valiant
- fast response cutters USCGC Donald Horsley, USCGC Heriberto Hernandez, USCGC Joseph Napier, USCGC Richard Dixon
- USCGC Winslow Griesser
- coastal patrol boat USCGC Yellowfin
- buoy tenders USCGC Cypress and USCGC Elm

Federal aid arrived on September 25 with the reopening of major ports. Eleven cargo vessels collectively carrying 1.3 million liters of water, 23,000 cots, and dozens of generators arrived. Full operations at the ports of Guayanilla, Salinas, and Tallaboa resumed on September 25, while the ports of San Juan, Fajardo, Culebra, Guayama, and Vieques had limited operations. The United States Air Force Air Mobility Command dedicated eight C-17 Globemaster aircraft to deliver relief supplies. The Air Force assisted the Federal Aviation Administration with air traffic control repairs to increase throughput.

The United States Transportation Command moved additional personnel and eight U.S. Army UH-60 Black Hawk helicopters from Fort Campbell, Kentucky to Luis Muñoz Marín International Airport to increase distribution capacity. The United States Army Corps of Engineers deployed 670 personnel engaged in assessing and restoring the power grid; as of September 25, 83 generators were installed and an additional 186 generators were en route. As of September 26, agencies of the U.S. government had delivered 4 million meals, 6 million liters of water, 70,000 tarps and 15,000 rolls of roof sheeting. National Guard troops were activated and deployed to Puerto Rico from Connecticut, Georgia, Iowa, Illinois, Kentucky, Missouri, New York, Rhode Island, and Wisconsin.

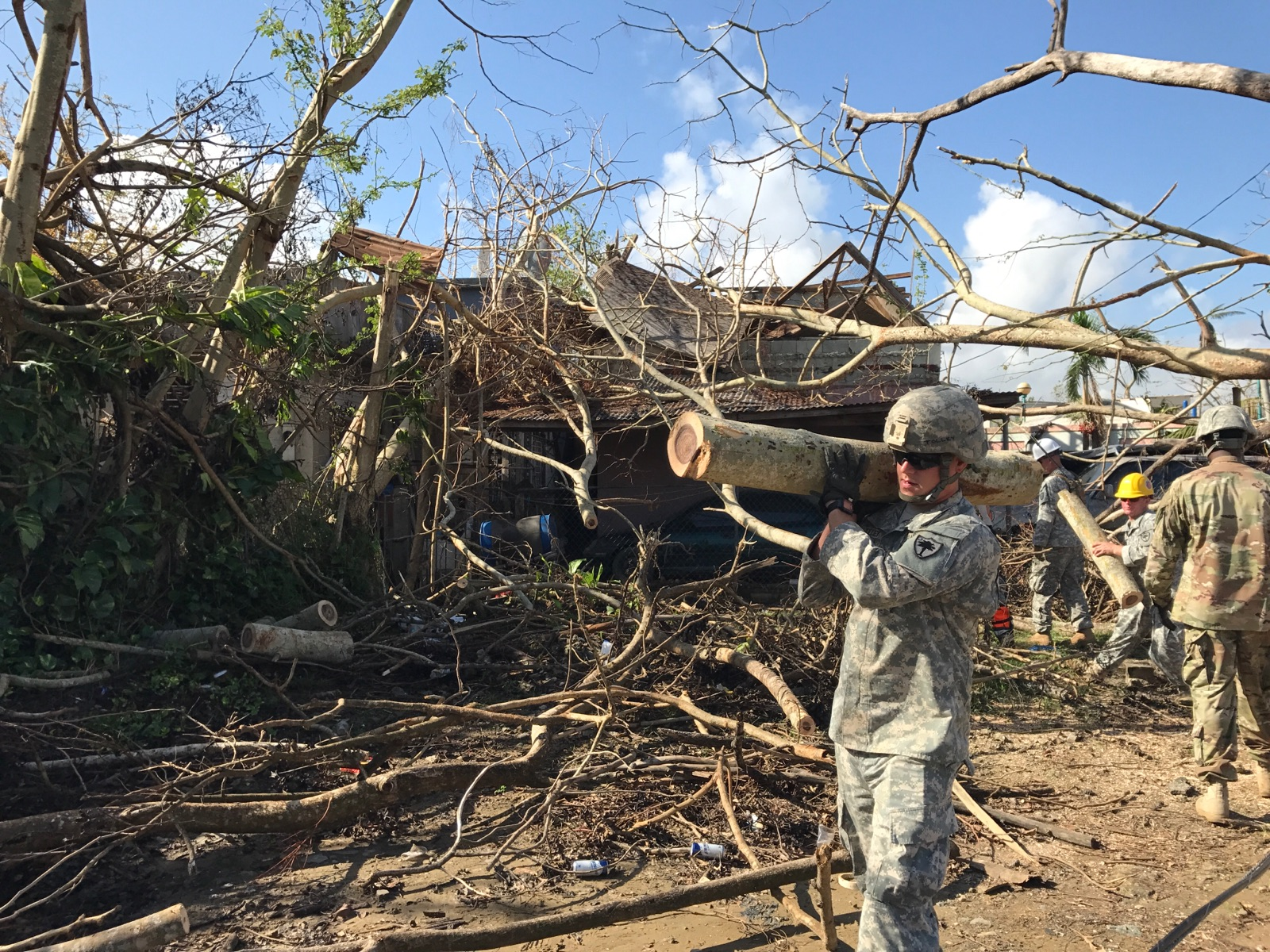
Members of the South Carolina National Guard assisting with clean up efforts in Caguas

=== Healthcare ===
Hospital ship USNS Comfort arrived in San Juan on October 3. A couple of days later, the Comfort departed on an around the island tour to assist, remaining a dozen miles off shore. Patients were brought to the ship by helicopter or boat tender after referrals by Puerto Rico's Department of Health. However, most of the 250 bed floating state-of-the-art hospital went unused despite overburdened island clinics and hospitals because few referrals were made. Rosselló explained on or about October 17 that "The disconnect or the apparent disconnect was in the communications flow" and added "I asked for a complete revision of that so that we can now start sending more patients over there."

On September 27, the Pentagon reopened two major airfields and started sending aircraft, specialized units, and a hospital ship to assist in the relief effort; Brigadier General Richard C. Kim, the deputy commanding general of United States Army North, was responsible for coordinating operations between the military, FEMA and other government agencies, and the private sector. Massive amounts of water, food, and fuel either had been delivered to ports or were held up at ports in the mainland United States lacking truck drivers to move the goods into the interior; the lack of communication networks hindered the effort–only 20% of drivers reported to work. As of September 28, the Port of San Juan had been able to dispatch only 4% of deliveries received and had little room to accept additional shipments. As of September 28, 44 percent of the population remained without potable water and the U.S. military was shifting from "a short term, sea-based response to a predominantly land-based effort designed to provide robust, longer term support" with fuel delivery a top priority. A joint Army National Guard and Marine expeditionary unit (MEU) team established an Installation Staging Base at the former Roosevelt Roads Naval Station; they transported Department of Health and Human Services assessment teams to hospitals across Puerto Rico via helicopter to determine medical needs. On September 29, the amphibious assault ship USS Wasp switched from providing relief activities to Dominica to Puerto Rico. As of September 30, FEMA official Alejandro de la Campa stated that 5% of electricity, 33% of the telecommunications infrastructure, and 50% of water services had been restored.

=== Logistics ===
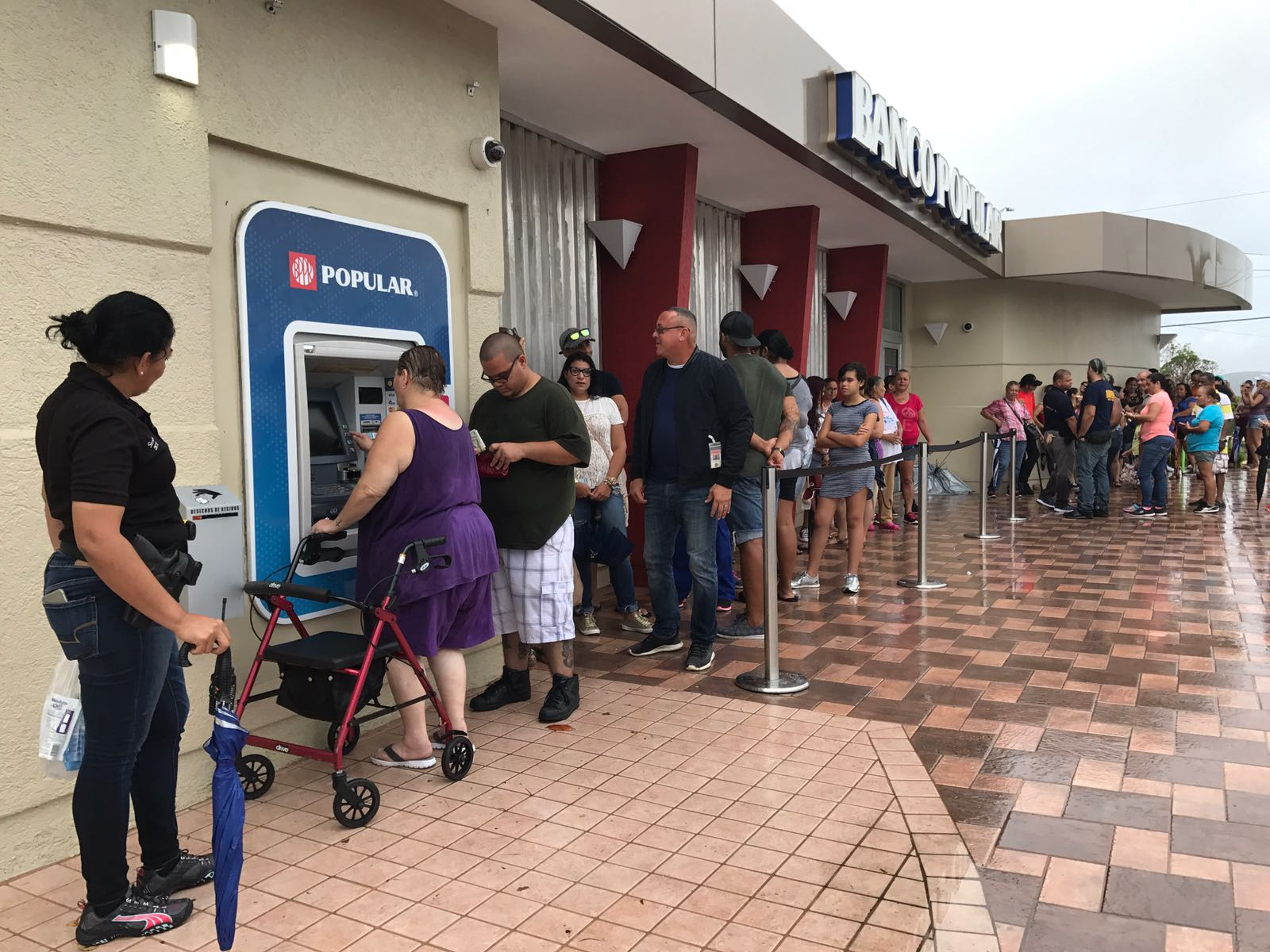
More than a week after Hurricane Maria struck, residents of Ponce, Puerto Rico wait in long lines at an ATM to withdraw cash.

On September 28, Lieutenant General Jeffrey S. Buchanan was dispatched to lead military relief efforts and to see how the military could become more effective, particularly in dealing with the thousands of containers of supplies that were stuck in port because of "red tape, lack of drivers, and a crippling power outage". On September 29 he stated that not enough troops and equipment were in place, but that more would be arriving soon.

With centralized fossil-fuel-based power plants and grid infrastructure expected to be out of commission for weeks to months, some renewable energy projects accelerated, including the shipment of hundreds of Tesla Powerwall battery systems to be integrated with solar PV systems and Sonnen solar microgrid projects at 15 emergency community centers. Other solar companies jumped into help, including Sunnova and New Start Solar. A charity called Light Up Puerto Rico raised money to purchase and deliver solar products, including solar panels, on October 19.

Many celebrities donated to hurricane relief organizations. Prominently, Jennifer Aniston pledged a million U.S. dollars, dividing the amount equally between the Red Cross and the Ricky Martin Foundation for Puerto Rico. Martin's foundation had raised over three million dollars as of October 13.

On October 10, 2017, Carnival Cruise Line announced that it would resume departures from San Juan on October 15, 2017. On October 13, CNN and The Guardian reported that Puerto Ricans were drinking water from a well at an EPA Superfund site; the water was later determined to be safe to drink.

On October 13, the Trump administration requested $4.9 billion to fund a loan program to address basic functions and infrastructure needs.

As of October 20, only 18.5% of the island had electricity, 49.1% of cell towers were working, and 69.5% of customers had running water. Restoration was slowest in the north. Ports and commercial flights resumed normal operations, but 7.6% of USPS locations, 11.5% of supermarkets, and 21.4% of gas stations were still closed. 4,246 people remained in emergency shelters, and tourism was down by half. A December 17 report indicated that 600 people remained in shelters while 130,000 had left the island for the mainland.

=== Possible leptospirosis outbreak ===
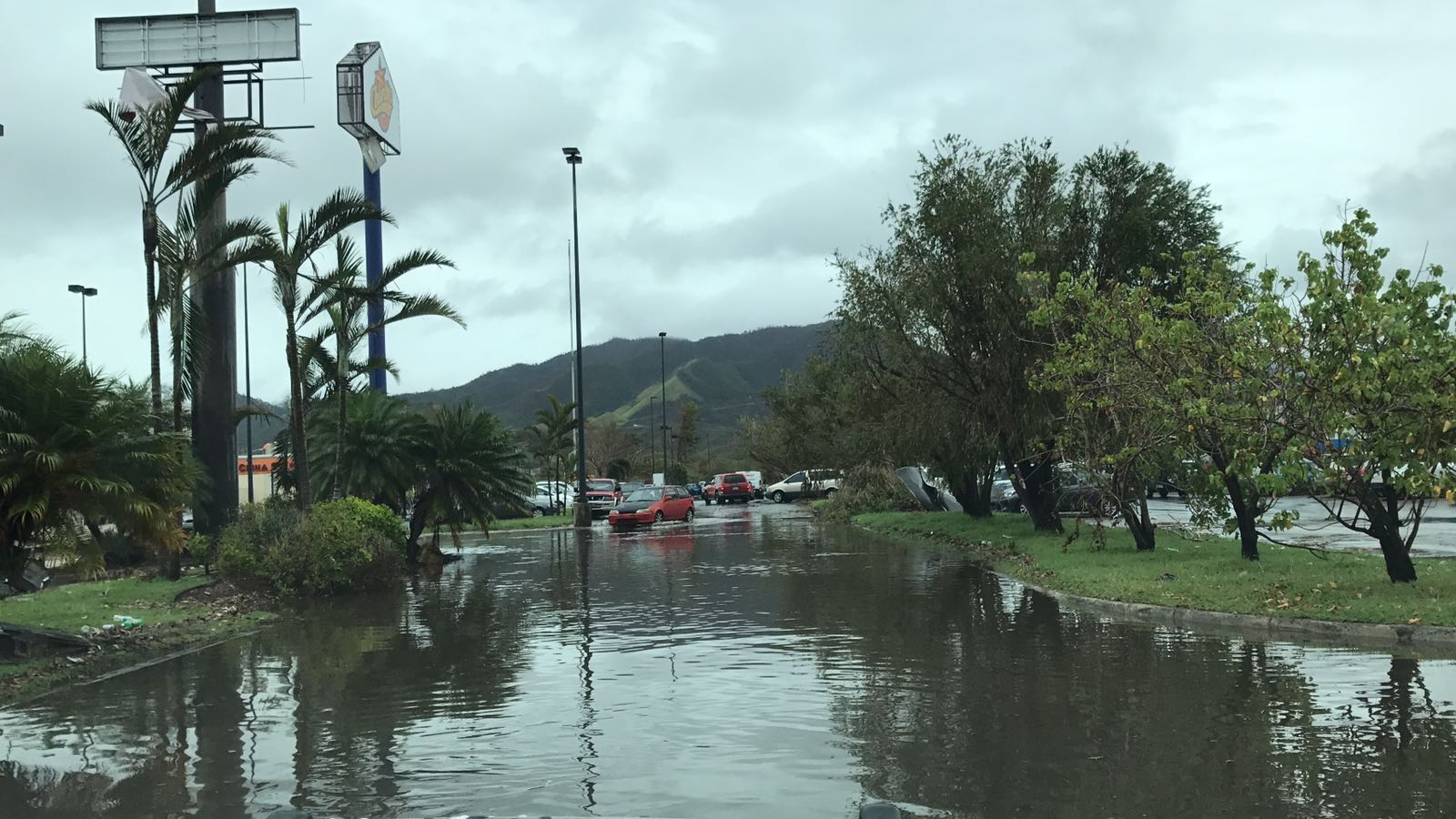
Standing water in Ponce, Puerto Rico, more than a week after Hurricane Maria hit the island

Leptospirosis was reported to have killed four people as of October 23, along with 74 other infections. 18 cases 4 deaths had been confirmed with 99 suspected cases by November 7. Puerto Rico averages 5 cases of leptospirosis per month under normal conditions. Despite the possibility of an outbreak, officials did not deem the situation to be dire.

=== 2018 ===
Medical devices and pharmaceuticals represent 30% of Puerto Rico's economy. Its factories either shut down or greatly reduced production, and recovered only slowly. This caused a months-long shortage of some medical supplies on the mainland. Small IV bags often come prefilled with saline or common drugs in solution; shortages forced health care providers to find alternative methods.

By the end of January 2018, approximately 450,000 people remained without power island-wide. On February 11, an explosion and fire damaged a power substation in Monacillo, blacking out northern parts of the island including San Juan, Trujillo Alto, Guaynabo, Carolina, Caguas, and Juncos. Cascading outages affected areas powered by substations in Villa Bettina and Quebrada Negrito.

=== After 2018 ===
In 2018, electric and water service was restored to most of the island, though outages continued. In 2020, FEMA officials indicated that the island was not prepared for another hurricane.

By 2021, most of the reconstruction work had not been begun, let alone completed. As of September 2021, FEMA had only delivered 18% of funds allocated for the island. Of the 19,558 homes affected that requested financial assistance, only 1,651 had been repaired or remodeled. On September 23, 2021, governor Pedro Pierluisi stated the government had identified 7,060 homes in 39 municipalities that lost their roofs during the hurricane and still used blue tarps.

== Criticism of U.S. government response ==
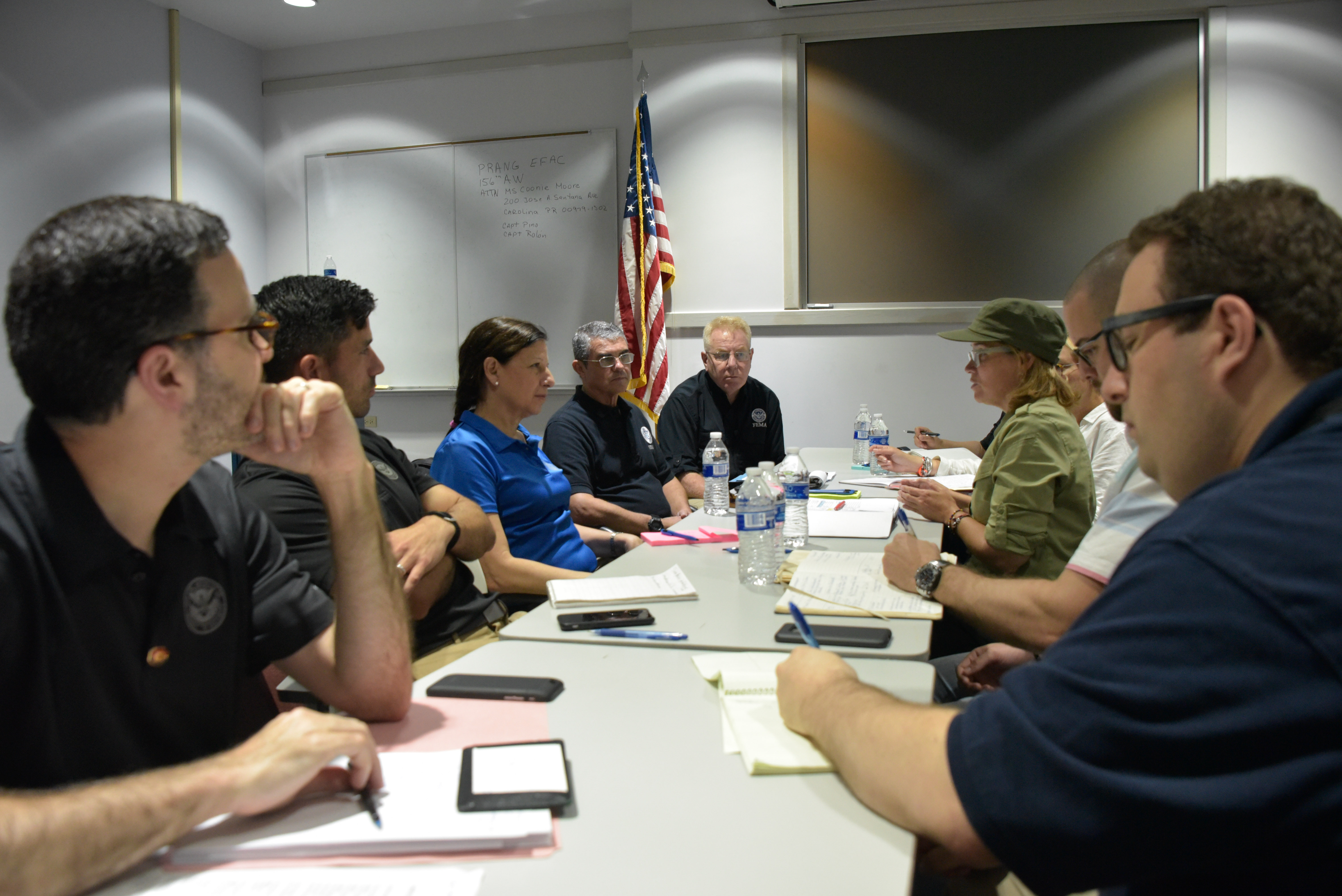
San Juan Mayor Carmen Yulín Cruz (pictured with federal agency employees) harshly criticized the federal response to Maria as inadequate.

The U.S. Department of Homeland Security (DHS) did not immediately waive the Jones Act, which prevented the commonwealth from receiving aid and supplies from non-U.S.-flagged vessels from U.S. ports (ships arriving directly from non-US ports were exempt). A DHS spokesman said that U.S. shipping would be enough, and that the limiting factors were port capacity and local transport capacity. The Jones Act was waived for ten days on September 28 following a Rosselló's formal request.

San Juan Mayor Carmen Yulín Cruz on September 26 pleaded for relief efforts to be sped up. The White House contested claims that the administration was not responding effectively. General Joseph L. Lengyel, Chief of the National Guard Bureau, defended the response, and reiterated that relief efforts were hampered because Puerto Rico was an island. President Donald Trump responded to accusations that he did not care about Puerto Rico: "Puerto Rico is important to me, and Puerto Rico – the people are fantastic people. I grew up in New York, so I know many people from Puerto Rico. I know many Puerto Ricans. And these are great people, and we have to help them. The island is devastated."

Frustrated with the government's "slow and inadequate response", Oxfam announced on October 2 that it planned to add to the humanitarian aid effort, sending a team to support on-the-ground efforts.

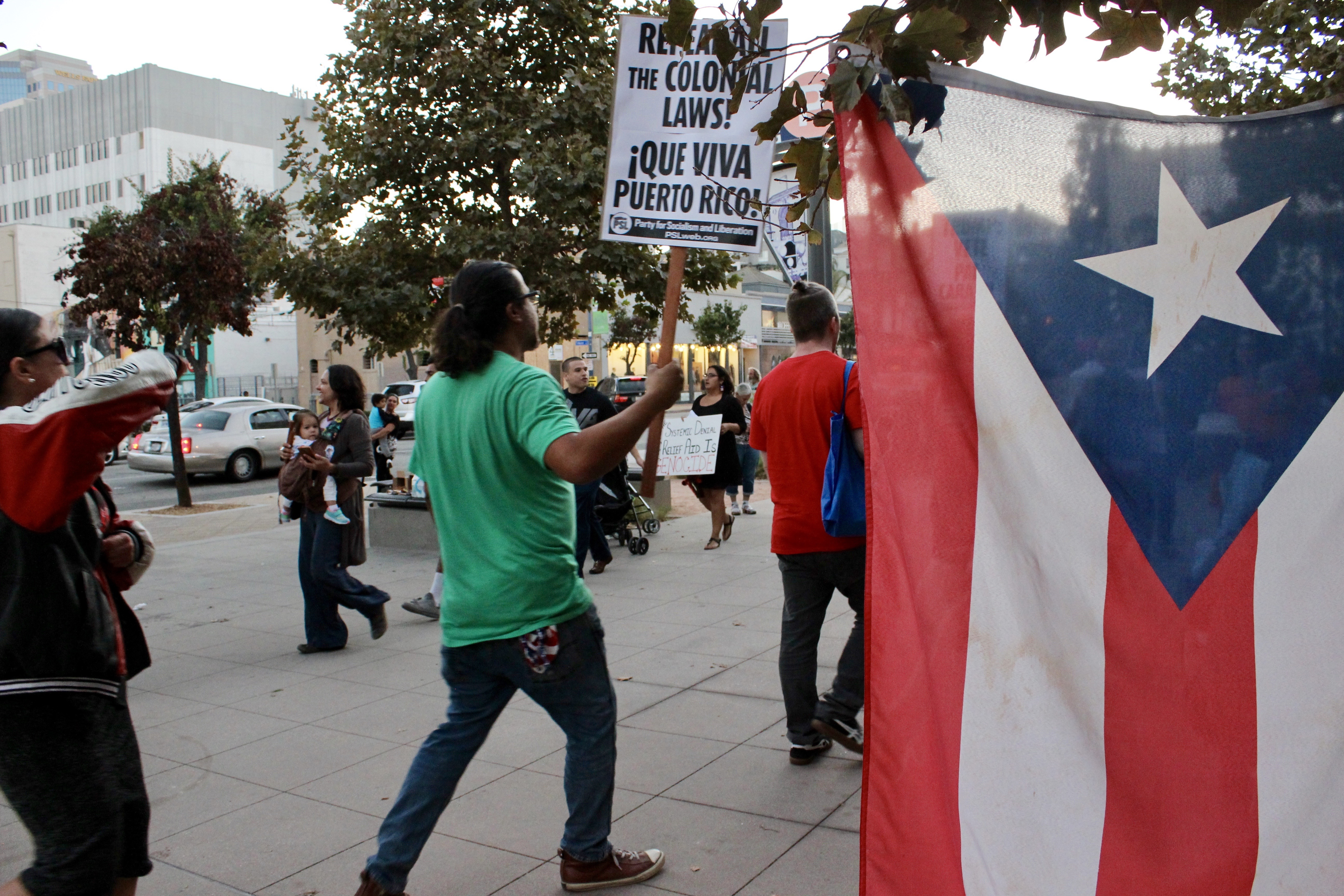
A rally for victims of the hurricane and Puerto Rico's status in general, in Long Beach, California, on October 3

On October 3, 2017, President Trump visited Puerto Rico. He compared the damage from Hurricane Maria to that of Hurricane Katrina, saying: "If you looked — every death is a horror, but if you look at a real catastrophe like Katrina, and you look at the tremendous hundreds and hundreds and hundreds of people that died, and you look at what happened here with really a storm that was just totally overbearing, nobody has seen anything like this (...) What is your death count as of this morning, 17?". Trump's remarks were widely criticized for implying that Hurricane Maria was not a "real catastrophe". Trump distributed canned goods and paper towels to crowds gathered at a relief shelter.

After visiting Puerto Rico about two months after the hurricane, Refugees International issued a report that criticized the slow federal response, criticized poor coordination and logistics, and indicated the island was still in need of more help.

=== Whitefish contract ===
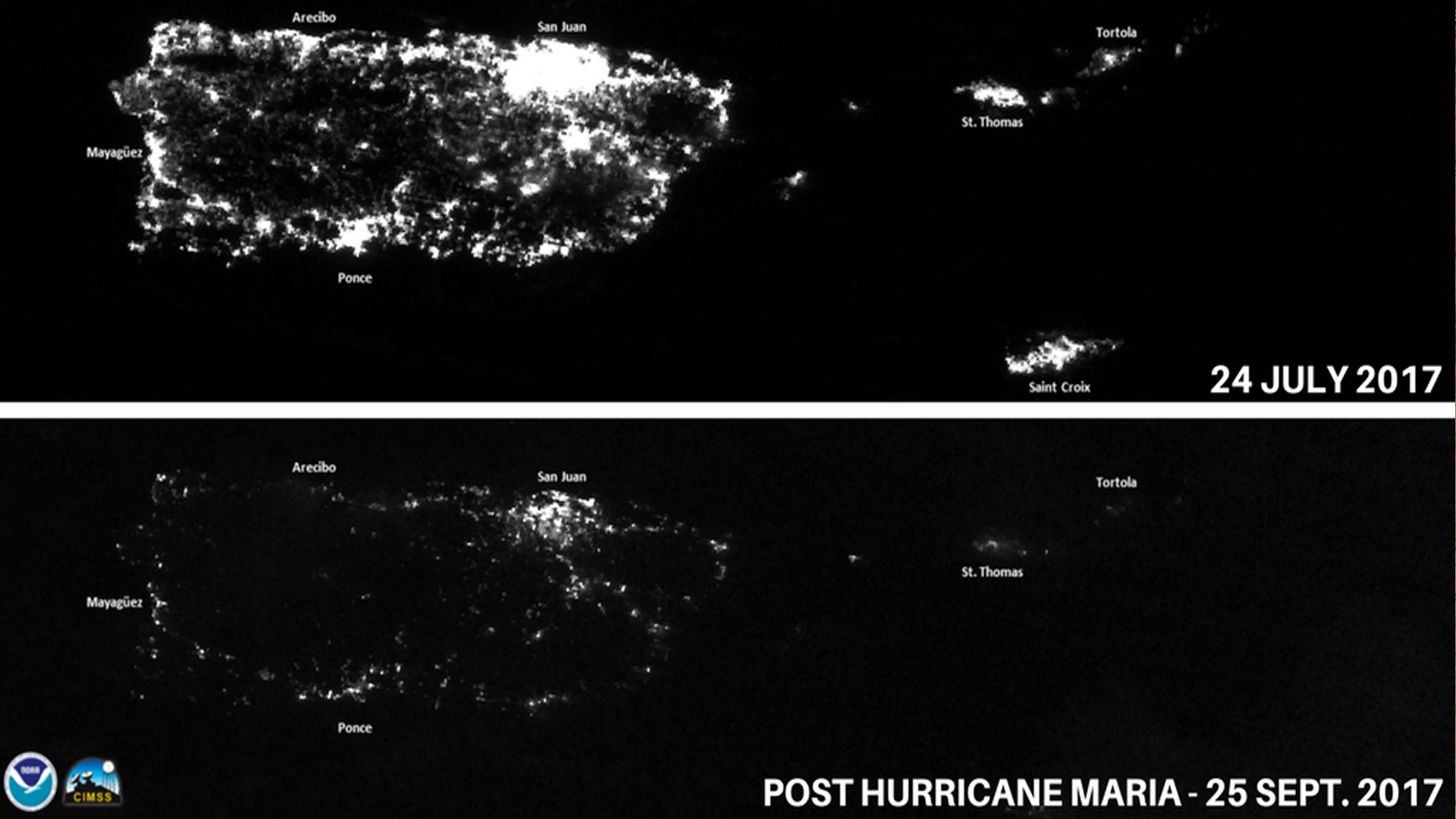
Comparison of lights at night before (top) and after (bottom) Hurricane Maria

Soon after the hurricane struck, Whitefish Energy, a Montana-based company with only two fulltime employees, was awarded a $300 million contract by PREPA, Puerto Rico's state-run power company, to repair Puerto Rico's power grid. The company contracted more than 300 personnel, mostly independent subcontractors, and sent them to the island. PREPA cited Whitefish's comparatively small upfront cost of $3.7 million for mobilization as one of the main reasons for contracting them over larger companies. PREPA Executive Director Ricardo Ramos stated: "Whitefish was the only company – it was the first that could be mobilized to Puerto Rico. It did not ask us to be paid soon or a guarantee to pay". No requests for assistance had been made to the American Public Power Association by October 24. The decision to hire such a tiny company was unusual. Former Energy Department official Susan Tierney stated, "The fact that there are so many utilities with experience in this and a huge track record of helping each other out, it is at least odd why [the utility] would go to Whitefish". Several Congresspeople, Democrats and Republicans, voiced concern over the contract. As the company was based in Whitefish, Montana, the hometown of US Interior Secretary Ryan Zinke, and one of Zinke's sons had once done a summer internship at Whitefish, Zinke knew Whitefish's CEO. These facts led to accusations of cronyism, though Zinke dismissed these claims and stated that he had no role in securing the contract. Trump may have been involved in Whitefish obtaining the contract, as Whitefish's primary investor, HBC Investments, was founded by a prominent Trump donor.

In a press release on October 27, FEMA stated it did not approve PREPA's contract with Whitefish and cited "significant concerns". Rosselló subsequently ordered an audit. DHS Inspector General John Roth led the audit, while Governor Rosselló called for a second review by Puerto Rico's Office of Management and Budget. The governor demanded that the contract be canceled; this was executed on October 29.

== See also ==
- 1928 San Felipe Segundo hurricane – only Category 5 hurricane landfall on record
- 1899 San Ciriaco hurricane – deadliest hurricane in the history of Puerto Rico
- 1932 San Ciprian hurricane – last hurricane to make landfall at Category 4 strength or higher.
- Hurricane Georges in 1998 – the last major hurricane to strike Puerto Rico
