= Philip Cortez =

Texas politician (born 1978)

Philip A. Cortez

Member of the Texas House of Representatives from the 117th district
- Incumbent
- Assumed office January 10, 2017
- Preceded by: Rick Galindo
- In office January 8, 2013 – January 13, 2015
- Preceded by: John Garza
- Succeeded by: Rick Galindo

Member of the San Antonio City Council from the 4th district
- In office June 2007 – May 2011
- Preceded by: Richard Perez
- Succeeded by: Rey Saldana

Personal details
- Born: Philip Adam Cortez; July 7, 1978 (age 48)
- Party: Democratic
- Education: University of Texas at San Antonio (BA); University of Texas at San Antonio (MPA); University of Texas at Austin (PhD)
- Occupation: United States Air Force Reserve captain
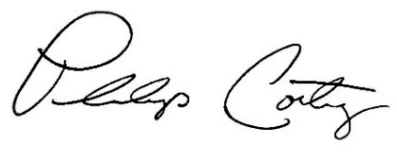
- Signature
- Website: www.philipcortez.com

Philip Adam Cortez (born July 7, 1978) is a Democratic member of the Texas House of Representatives. He previously served as a State Representative for House District 117 during the 83rd Legislative Session. From 2007 to 2012, he was a member of the nominally nonpartisan San Antonio City Council, on which he was a firm ally of then Mayor Julian Castro.

Cortez is a captain in the Air Force Reserve, having originally joined the Air Force as an enlisted airman.

In the November 6, 2012 general election, Cortez unseated the freshman Republican John Garza. In his first term, Cortez was named the top Democratic freshman by Capitol Inside.

In the November 4, 2014 general election, Cortez was narrowly unseated by the Republican Rick Galindo, who won his party primary on March 4 with 2,372 votes (64.6 percent). Galindo thwarted the primary comeback bid waged by former Representative John Garza, who trailed with 1,300 votes (35.4 percent) of the ballots cast. In the November 4 general election, Galindo defeated Cortez, 12,835 votes (52.7 percent) to 11,521 (47.3 percent).

Cortez returned in 2016 to unseat Galindo, who polled 27,783 votes (48.6 percent) in the general election to Cortez's 29,319 (51.3 percent). Cortez won again in the general election held on November 6, 2018, when he handily defeated the conservative Republican candidate, Michael Berlanga, 32,779 (57.4 percent) to 24,352 (42.6 percent). Berlanga (born December 16, 1959) is a certified public accountant in San Antonio who formerly ran for Bexar County tax assessor-collector but lost to Democrat Albert Uresti.

Prior to the Texas House of Representatives, Philip Cortez was San Antonio City Councilman for District 4. In 2007, he won with over 70% of the vote and was re-elected in 2009 with over 78% of the vote.

Cortez's younger brother, Joseph Cortez (born 1983), was a candidate for the District 6 seat on the San Antonio City Council in the municipal election held on May 6, 2017. Joseph Cortez sought to succeed the term-limited Ray Lopez, for whom he was the policy and communications advisor during the preceding three years.

On July 27, 2021, an arrest warrant was issued for Cortez for fleeing Texas to DC in an attempt to block quorum during special session.

Texas House of Representatives
Preceded by John Garza	Texas State Representative for District 117 (Bexar County); 2013–2015	Succeeded by Rick Galindo
Preceded by Rick Galindo	Texas State Representative for District 117 (Bexar County); 2017–	Succeeded by Incumbent
