= Rick Galindo =

American politician

Member of the Texas House of Representatives from the 117th district
- In office January 13, 2015 – January 9, 2017
- Preceded by: Philip Cortez
- Succeeded by: Philip Cortez

Personal details
- Born: Ricardo Galindo III San Antonio, Texas, U.S.
- Party: Republican
- Education: St. Mary's University

Ricardo Galindo III is an American politician. He served as a Republican member for the 117th district of the Texas House of Representatives.

Born in San Antonio, Texas, the son of Valerie and Oscar Hernandez Galindo, Galindo attended St. Mary's University in Texas. In 2015, he was elected to represent the 117th district of the Texas House of Representatives, succeeding Philip Cortez. In 2017, he was succeeded by Cortez with Galindo claiming that there was "a flagrant abuse of the public trust" in one of Cortez's business methods.
