= Memorial High School (San Antonio, Texas) =

Location
- 1227 Memorial Street; San Antonio, Bexar County, Texas 78228; United States; 29.446145°N 98.564143°W

Information
- School type: Public, high school
- Locale: City: Large
- School district: Edgewood ISD
- NCES School ID: 481815001628
- Principal: Bryan Norwood
- Faculty: 64.02 (on an FTE basis)
- Grades: 9‍–‍12
- Enrollment: 872 (2022‍–‍2023)
- Student to teacher ratio: 13.62
- Color
- Athletics conference: UIL Class 4A
- Team name: Minutemen
- Website: Official website

Memorial High School is a public high school located in northwest San Antonio, Texas. It is one of two high schools in the Edgewood Independent School District, and is classified as a 4A school by the University Interscholastic League. During 2022‍–‍2023, Memorial High School had an enrollment of 872 students and a student to teacher ratio of 13.62. The school received an overall rating of "C" from the Texas Education Agency for the 2024‍–‍2025 school year.

== Athletics ==
The Memorial Minutemen compete in the following sports:

- Baseball
- Basketball
- Cheerleading
- Cross Country
- Football
- Golf
- Powerlifting
- Soccer
- Softball
- Tennis
- Track and Field
- Volleyball
- Marching Band

State finalists

- Girls powerlifting Division 1 qualifier 2017-2018
- Girls powerlifting second place champion 2018-2019
