= Heriberto Hernandez =

U.S. Coast Guardsman (1948–1968)

Hernandez leaning on the 13-foot whaler he was manning when he was mortally wounded in 1968.

Heriberto S. "Ed" Hernandez (July 23, 1948 – December 5, 1968) was a fireman in the United States Coast Guard.

He was a fireman on board a Point Class cutter, the USCGC Point Cypress, during the War in Vietnam. He was killed in the course of a reconnaissance mission on the Rach Nang River when his fiberglass boat came under automatic weapons fire from a riverside bunker operated by the Viet Cong. Hernandez, along with the other two crew members, was hit by several rounds. Although brought back aboard the Point Cyprus, Hernandez was declared dead soon after. He received a posthumous Bronze Star for valor.

== Personal life ==
According to the San Antonio Express-News, Hernandez's family was so poor that he often was forced to walk around without shoes. The Express News reported that 52 other young men from his school district lost their lives in the Vietnam War.

Mario Longoria, a childhood friend who spoke at the 2015 commissioning of USCGC Heriberto Hernandez, described how, for most of their childhood and youth, San Antonio was still a racially segregated city, where Hispanic-Americans only went to school with other Hispanic-Americans. Similarly, while Hernandez was athletic, enjoying boxing, he only competed with other Hispanic-Americans.

Hernandez attended John F. Kennedy High School but left after completing tenth grade, so he could join the U.S. Coast Guard, enlisting for four years of service on July 27, 1965.

== Coast Guard career ==
After boot Camp, Hernandez served aboard USCGC Bering Strait, Loran Station Saipan, and Base Galveston. He had some difficulty adapting to the service's discipline, in his first year, going AWOL once, but that he did not have these problems in subsequent years. Hernandez earned a high school equivalency certificate while he was in the Coast Guard. In the spring of 1968 he was assigned to Coast Guard Squadron One in South Vietnam, serving aboard USCGC Point Cypress. Hernandez was known for volunteering for dangerous duty, like the excursion where he was mortally wounded. On December 5, 1968, Hernandez volunteered to help man the cutter's fiberglass Boston Whaler small boat, when a visiting senior officer wanted to go on a recon excursion up a shallow waterway. They observed Viet Cong fortifications lining a bank, and the officer opened fire, triggering return fire that cut down all four men in the whaler. Hernandez survived long enough to be returned to Point Cypress, but died soon after.

Fireman Hernandez was awarded the Bronze Star with Combat "V" device and the Purple Heart Medal posthumously. Part of his Bronze Star citation for valor reads:

Fireman Hernandez's heroic actions under enemy fire were instrumental to the success of friendly forces in harassing and destroying the enemy's morale and feeling of security. Fireman Hernandez's professional skill, courage under enemy fire, and devotion to duty reflected great credit upon himself, and were in keeping with the highest traditions of the United States Naval Service.

— Vice Admiral Elmo R. Zumwalt, Commander, Naval Forces, Vietnam

== Awards and decorations ==

Bronze Star Medal with "V" device		Purple Heart
National Defense Service Medal	Vietnam Service Medal with one bronze service star	Vietnam Campaign Medal

== Legacy ==
In 2010, Master Chief Petty Officer of the Coast Guard Charles "Skip" W. Bowen, the U.S. Coast Guard's senior enlisted person at the time, lobbied for the new Sentinel-class cutters to be named after enlisted Coast Guardsmen or personnel from its precursor services, who had distinguished themselves by their heroism. The fourteenth cutter was named after Hernandez, and was commissioned in its home port of San Juan, Puerto Rico, on October 16, 2015.
