= Meteorological history of Hurricane Maria =

Hurricane Maria
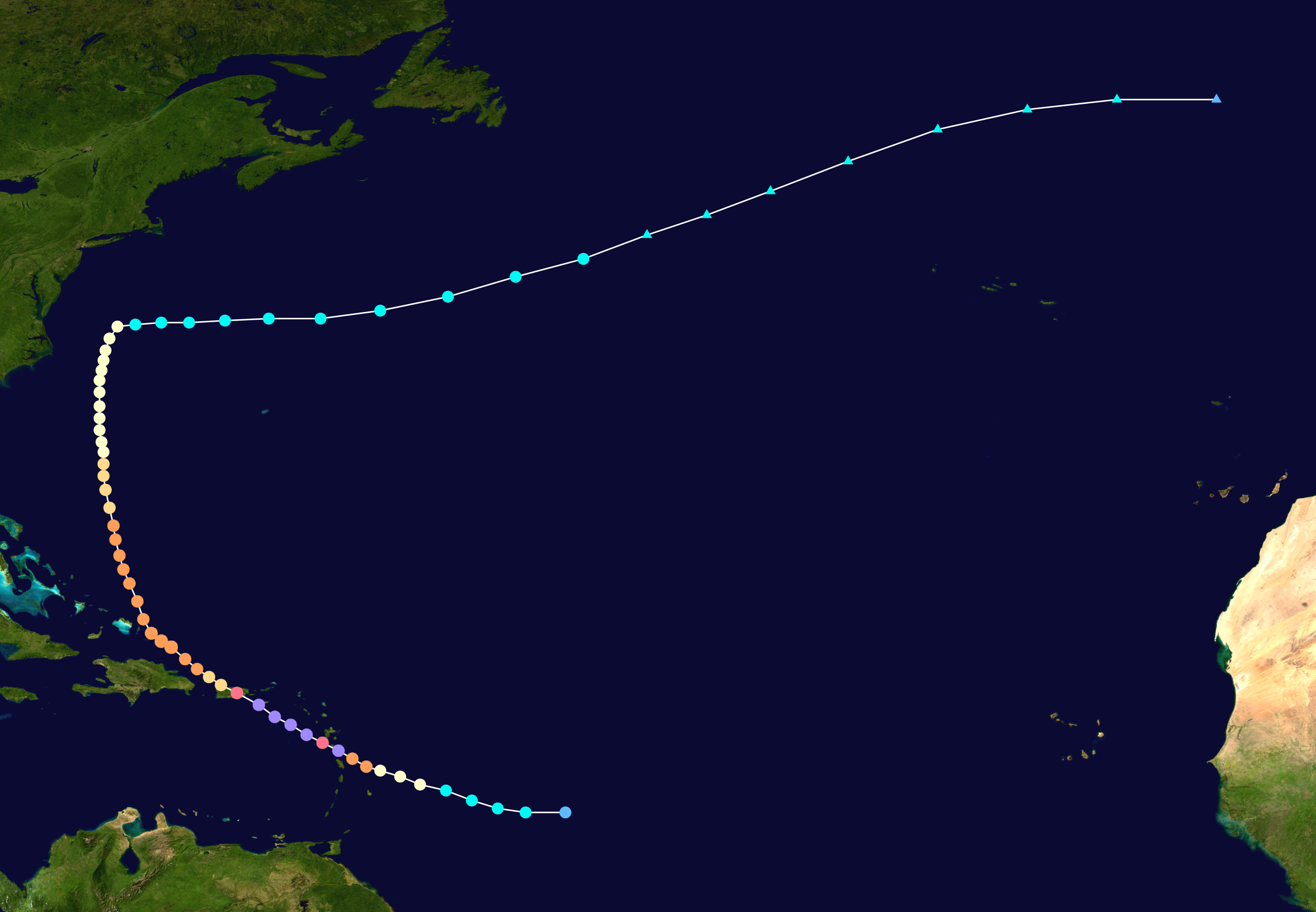
- Track of Hurricane Maria

Meteorological history
- Formed: September 16, 2017
- Extratropical: September 30, 2017
- Dissipated: October 2, 2017

Category 5 major hurricane
- 1-minute sustained (SSHWS/NWS)
- Highest winds: 175 mph (280 km/h)
- Lowest pressure: 908 mbar (hPa); 26.81 inHg

Overall effects
- Areas affected: Dominica, St. Croix, Puerto Rico, Hispaniola, The Bahamas, East Coast of the United States
- Part of the 2017 Atlantic hurricane season
- History • Meteorological history Effects; U.S territory • Puerto Rico • Death toll controversy Other wikis • Commons: Maria images

Hurricane Maria was among the most intense Atlantic hurricanes on record and caused catastrophic damage in Puerto Rico in late September 2017. Originating from a tropical wave, it developed into a tropical depression on September 16 while situated to the east of the Lesser Antilles. Gradual intensification occurred over the next day or two and it strengthened into a tropical storm, which was named Maria. By late on September 17, Maria had intensified into a hurricane. As it approached the island arc, it underwent explosive intensification on September 18, with the hurricane reaching Category 5 intensity as it made landfall on the island of Dominica early on September 19. Land interaction weakened the storm somewhat, although it was able to quickly recover and later peaked that night with sustained winds of 175 mph (280 km/h) and a pressure of 908 mbar (26.8 inHg). Early the next morning it weakened to a high-end Category 4 hurricane before making landfall in Puerto Rico. Maria weakened significantly due to crossing the island, but was able to strengthen somewhat as it passed close to Hispaniola and The Bahamas on September 21–23. Structural changes in the hurricane as it moved further north and close to the Outer Banks in the United States ultimately caused Maria to weaken quickly. Turning away from the United States as a weakened tropical storm, it became extratropical on September 30, then dissipated two days later.

The hurricane caused catastrophic damage across its path in the Caribbean, with 3,057 killed and around $91.6 billion (2017 USD) in damages, making it the fourth-costliest Atlantic hurricane on record. The islands of Dominica and Puerto Rico experienced the worst impacts of Maria, which was the most intense storm to strike the former, and the worst storm to strike the latter since the 1928 San Felipe Segundo hurricane.

== Origins ==
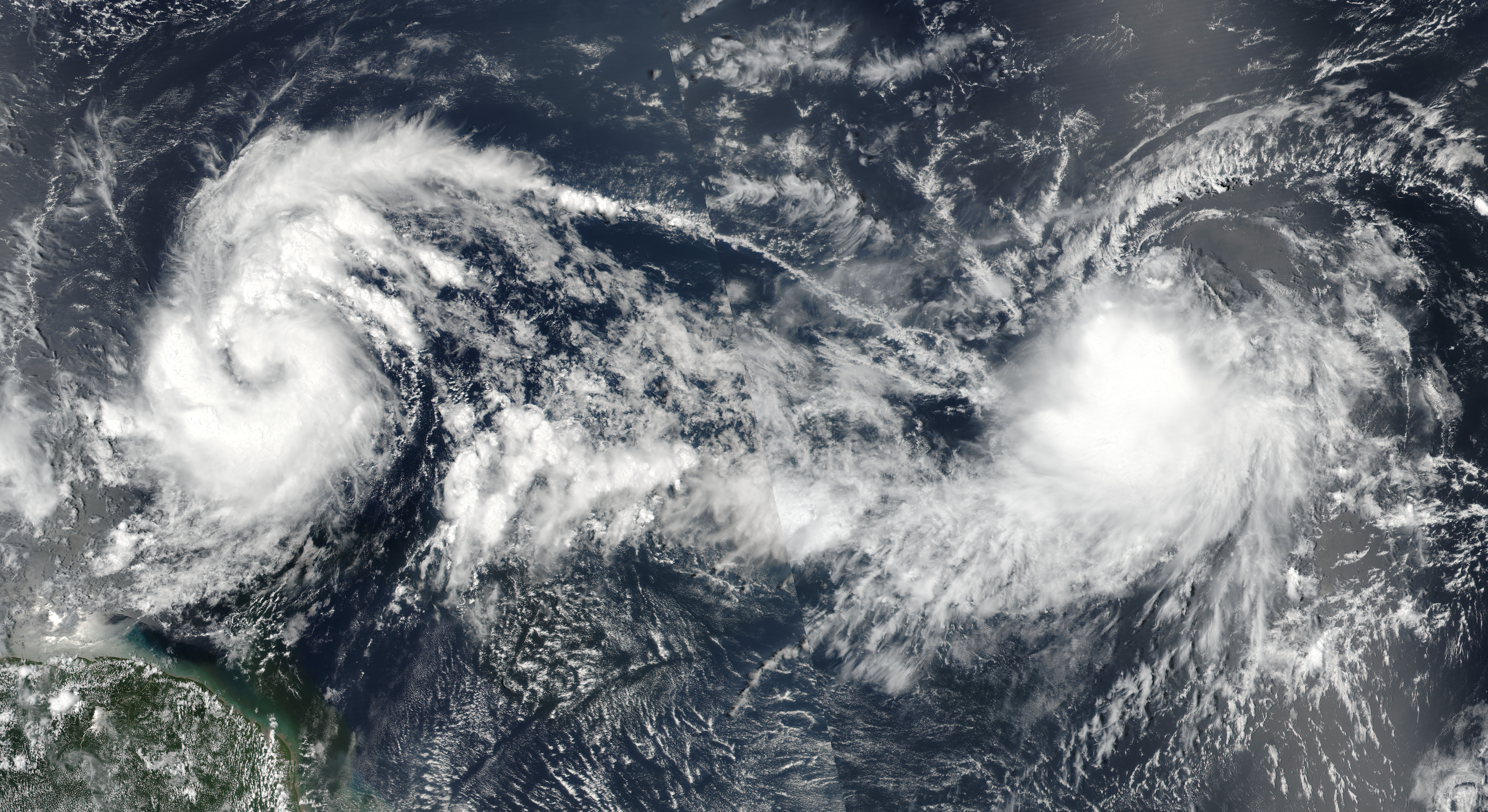
Tropical Storm Maria east of the Lesser Antilles on September 16, with Lee to its east

The National Hurricane Center (NHC) began monitoring two tropical waves on September 13. The eastern wave quickly spun up into what would become Tropical Storm Lee, while the western one continued moving generally westward. With mostly favorable conditions in the disturbance's path, development into a tropical cyclone seemed likely. During those two days the disturbance became better organized, and by September 16, convective banding became established around a poorly-organized circulation. As the system was an imminent threat to land despite the center not appearing to be well-defined, the NHC upgraded it to Potential Tropical Cyclone Fifteen at 12:00 UTC, while situated 665 mi (1,070 km) east of Barbados. Post-storm analysis, however, indicated that the disturbance had become a tropical depression at that time. The NHC operationally upgraded the storm to a tropical depression three hours later. A mid-level ridge anchored north of the disturbance steered it generally west-northwest into a region highly favorable for further development.

Sea surface temperatures of 84 °F (29 °C), low wind shear, and ample moisture were anticipated to foster strengthening to hurricane-status before the system reached the Lesser Antilles. As the disturbance continued to grow increasingly well-defined throughout the day, it was upgraded to a tropical storm at 18:00 UTC that day based on satellite estimates, and was given the name Maria. A central dense overcast and favorable outflow developed atop the center of circulation, which enabled Maria to become further organized throughout the early morning hours of September 17. After a brief intrusion of dry air exposed the circulation, a convective burst occurred over the center and intensification resumed. Hurricane Hunters investigating the system observed surface winds of 74 mph (119 km/h) and a formative eye feature. Accordingly, the NHC upgraded Maria to hurricane status at 18:00 UTC.

== Rapid intensification and Caribbean landfalls ==
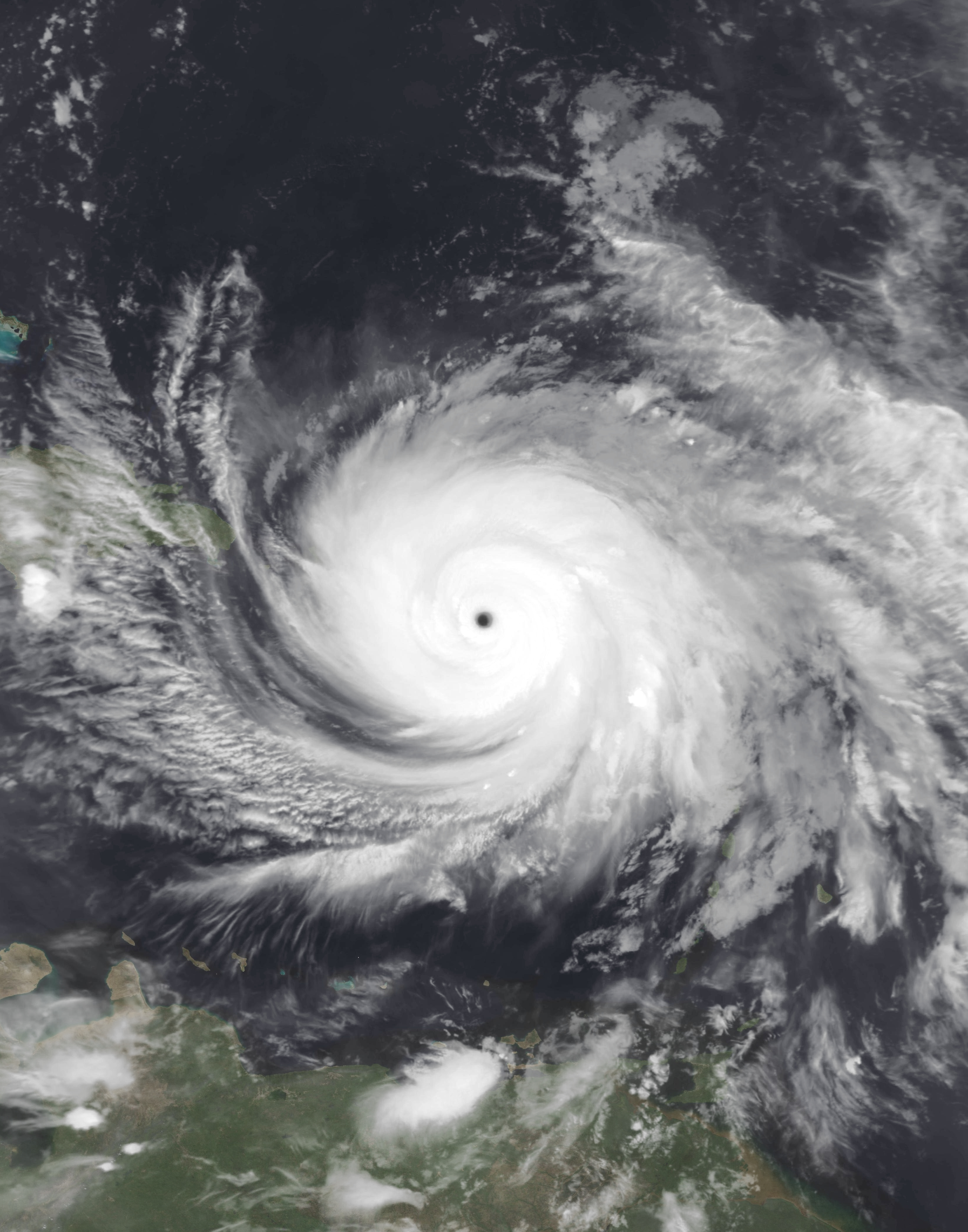
Hurricane Maria at peak intensity to the south of St. Croix, early on September 20

Expansion of the central dense overcast and an increasingly complete eyewall signaled steady intensification throughout the night of September 17–18. Considerable lightning activity was identified within the hurricane's core early on September 18 and statistical models indicated a high probability of rapid intensification. Explosive strengthening took place shortly thereafter, with aircraft reconnaissance finding surface winds of 120 mph (190 km/h) and a central pressure of 959 mbar (hPa; 28.32 inHg), making Maria a Category 3 hurricane on the Saffir–Simpson scale, and hence a major hurricane. Additionally, radar data revealed a well-defined 12 mi (19 km) wide eye. The eye contracted slightly to 9 mi (14 km) as intensification continued.

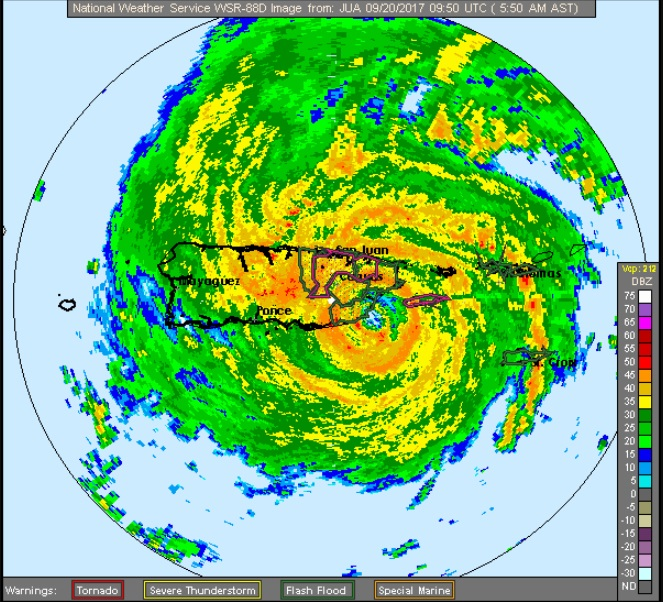
Final radar image of Maria from the San Juan radar at 09:50 UTC (5:50 a.m local time) on September 20, before it was destroyed

Rapid intensification culminated late on September 18, with Maria achieving Category 5 status just 15 mi (25 km) east-southeast of Dominica. Hurricane Hunters observed surface winds of 160 mph (260 km/h) and a pressure of 925 mbar (hPa; 27.32 inHg) at this time, and soon afterward, Maria reached its initial peak intensity with winds of 165 mph (270 km/h) and a central pressure of 922 mbar (hPa; 27.23 inHg). Maria made landfall in Dominica at 01:15 UTC on September 19, becoming the first Category 5 hurricane on record to strike the island nation. Interaction with the high mountains of Dominica imparted slight weakening of the hurricane to Category 4; however, once it had emerged into the Caribbean Sea, Maria quickly regained Category 5 intensity. Additional strengthening took place as the storm tracked northwest toward Puerto Rico. Despite the formation of concentric eyewalls—the larger one spanning 23 to 35 mi (37 to 56 km) and the smaller only 6 mi (9.7 km), signalling the start of an eyewall replacement cycle—the inner violent core remained undisrupted through the afternoon. Maria attained its peak intensity at 03:00 UTC on September 20, roughly 30 mi (45 km) south of St. Croix. Maximum sustained winds reached 175 mph (280 km/h), and the storm's central pressure bottomed out at 908 mbar (hPa; 26.81 inHg); this ranks it as the twelfth-most intense Atlantic hurricane since reliable records began.

The hurricane made its closest approach to St. Croix at around 05:00 UTC on September 20, passing within 20 mi (30 km) of the island; the storm's outer eyewall lashed the island while the more violent inner eye remained offshore. Three hours later, at around 08:00 UTC, the outer eyewall struck Vieques, an island off the eastern coast of Puerto Rico. By this time, the outer eyewall became dominant as the inner one decayed, and the eyewall replacement cycle caused Maria to weaken to Category 4 strength. Maria made landfall near Yabucoa, Puerto Rico, at 10:15 UTC, with winds of 155 mph (250 km/h) and a central pressure of 920 mbar (hPa; 27.17 inHg), making it the strongest to hit the island since the 1928 San Felipe Segundo hurricane, which had struck Puerto Rico as a Category 5 hurricane. Additionally, when Maria made landfall in Puerto Rico as a Category 4 storm, following the landfalls of Harvey and Irma, it marked the first time that three Category 4 hurricanes made landfall in the United States within a year, including unincorporated territories.

== Post-landfall reintensification ==
Infrared satellite loop of Maria passing east of Turks and Caicos Islands on September 22

Maria maintained a general west-northwest course across Puerto Rico, emerging over the Atlantic Ocean shortly before 18:00 UTC. Interaction with the mountainous terrain resulted in substantial weakening; sustained winds fell to 110 mph (175 km/h) and the central pressure rose to 959 mbars (hPa; 28.32 inHg). With favorable environmental conditions, Maria steadily reorganized as it moved away from Puerto Rico. A large eye, 45 mi (75 km) wide, developed with deep convection blossoming around it. Early on September 21, the system regained Category 3 intensity.

Initially, cooler waters stirred up by Hurricane Irma two weeks prior limited Maria's reorganization. During the afternoon of September 21, the system traversed the Navidad and Silver banks north of the Dominican Republic; shoaling from the region's shallow waters temporarily interfered with measurements of surface winds. Convection around the storm's eye deepened and its eye became better defined that night, and the hurricane reached a secondary peak with sustained winds of 125 mph (205 km/h). Maria passed 35 to 45 mi (56 to 72 km) east of the Turks and Caicos Islands on September 22. An increase in southwesterly wind shear prompted gradual weakening of the hurricane, starting with restriction of banding features and later degradation of the eyewall. Late on September 22, the hurricane turned north-northwest as it reached the western periphery of the ridge previously steering it northwest.

Maria fluctuated in organization throughout the day of September 23, with its eye periodically clearing and becoming cloud-filled; it maintained Category 3 hurricane strength during this phase. Despite a decreasing central pressure, the storm finally weakened to Category 2 strength at 06:00 UTC on September 24. Hurricane Hunters observed flight-level winds of 116 to 135 mph (187 to 217 km/h); however, surface wind returns by the NOAA's Stepped-Frequency Microwave Radiometer were only 90 mph (150 km/h), supportive of a lower intensity. This indicated below-average mixing down of winds aloft. By this time, Maria's trajectory had shifted almost due north between the aforementioned ridge and a cut-off low that was located over the eastern Gulf of Mexico.

== Demise ==
Weakening accelerated later on September 24 into September 25, as the hurricane traversed a cold wake—with sea surface temperatures of 75–77 °F (24–25 °C)—created by Hurricane Jose a week prior. Maria degraded to Category 1 strength during this time. Early on September 25, Maria's structure changed dramatically as its inner-core collapsed. The low-level circulation became exposed to the northwest, and most of the deep convection shifted to the eastern half of the storm. However, a sustained convective burst maintained Maria's hurricane intensity, with banding features evident on the eastern part of the circulation. Despite this, northwesterly wind shear continued to impinge on the storm, and Maria weakened to a tropical storm early on September 28. Simultaneously, Maria began to accelerate to the east-northeast as it became embedded into the mid-latitude westerlies. Gradually weakening, Maria soon began to move over sea surface temperatures of 73 °F (23 °C) and below, causing most of its convection to dissipate. Late on September 30, Maria transitioned into an extratropical cyclone. During the next couple of days, Maria's remnants accelerated east-northeastward towards the United Kingdom, while rapidly weakening. Maria's remnants later dissipated on October 2, to the southwest of Ireland.

== See also ==
- Hurricane Maria
- Hurricane Marilyn
