= John F. Kennedy High School (Texas) =

Location
- 1922 South General McMullen Drive; San Antonio, Bexar County, Texas 78226; United States; 29.395705°N 98.55715°W

Information
- School type: Public, high school
- Established: 1963
- Locale: City: Large
- School district: Edgewood ISD
- NCES School ID: 481815001624
- Principal: Jessica Husband
- Teaching staff: 62.46 (on an FTE basis)
- Grades: 9–12
- Enrollment: 1,042 (2022–2023)
- Student to teacher ratio: 16.68
- Colors: Green and white
- Athletics conference: UIL Class 5A
- Mascot: Rocket
- Website: jfkennedy.eisd.net

John F. Kennedy High School is a public high school in San Antonio, Texas and classified as a 4A school by the University Interscholastic League. It was established in 1963 and is part of the Edgewood Independent School District. During 2022–2023, Kennedy High School had an enrollment of 1,042 students and a student to teacher ratio of 16.68. The school received an overall rating of "C" from the Texas Education Agency for the 2024–2025 school year.

== History ==
John F. Kennedy High School was established in 1963. President Kennedy visited San Antonio on November 21, 1963, and promised to return and dedicate the new John F. Kennedy High School. He was assassinated in Dallas the following day.

== Notable alumni ==
- John Garza, congressman
- Heriberto Hernandez, United States Coast Guard fireman
