= Texas's 117th House of Representatives district =

American legislative district

Texas's 117th State House of Representatives district
Representative
Philip Cortez; D–San Antonio
- Demographics: 17.8% White; 9.1% Black; 70.1% Hispanic; 3.8% Asian
- Population (2020) • Voting age: 203,057; 142,508

The 117th district of the Texas House of Representatives contains parts of western San Antonio. The current representative is Philip Cortez, who was first elected in 2016.
