= USCGC Heriberto Hernandez =

Sentinel-class cutter

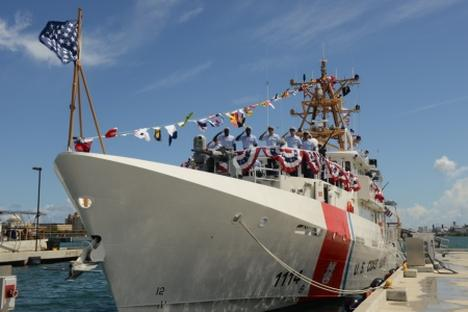
- Heriberto Hernandez was commissioned in San Juan on 16 October 2015

History

United States
- Namesake: Heriberto Hernandez
- Builder: Bollinger Shipyards, Lockport, Louisiana
- Launched: July 30, 2015
- Acquired: July 30, 2015
- Commissioned: October 16, 2015
- Home port: San Juan, Puerto Rico
- Identification: MMSI number: 338926414; Callsign: NDOB; Hull number: WPC-1114
- Motto: Valor sin temor (Valor without fear)
- Status: in active service
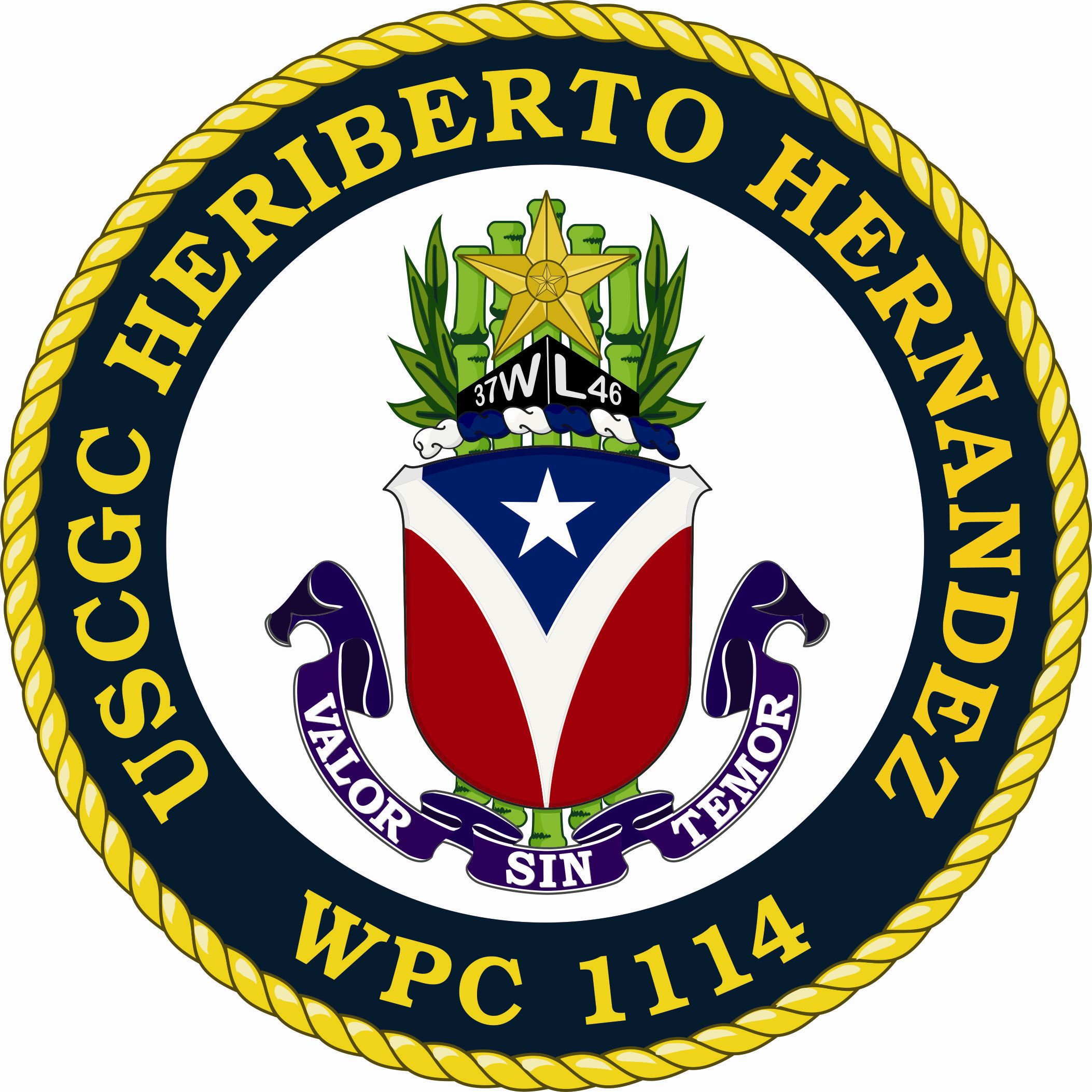
- Badge

General characteristics
- Class & type: Sentinel-class cutter
- Displacement: 353 long tons (359 t)
- Length: 46.8 m (154 ft)
- Beam: 8.11 m (26.6 ft)
- Depth: 2.9 m (9.5 ft)
- Propulsion: 2 × 4,300 kW (5,800 shp); 1 × 75 kW (101 shp) bow thruster
- Speed: 28 knots (52 km/h; 32 mph)
- Endurance: 5 days, 2,500 nmi (4,600 km; 2,900 mi); Designed to be on patrol 2,500 hours per year
- Boats & landing craft carried: 1 × Short Range Prosecutor RHIB
- Complement: 2 officers, 20 crew
- Sensors & processing systems: L-3 C4ISR suite
- Armament: 1 × Mk 38 Mod 2 25 mm automatic gun; 4 × Browning M2 .50 cal machine guns; Various small arms

USCGC Heriberto Hernandez is the 14th Sentinel-class cutter delivered to the United States Coast Guard. Like five of her sister ships, her initial assignment will see her based in San Juan, Puerto Rico.

The Coast Guard decided to design all its new cutters, even its smallest, to be able to accommodate mixed sex crews. The Sentinels, and the smaller Marine Protectors, have berthing areas of various sizes, to make this possible. A Sentinel's complement is 22, and they are armed with a 25 mm Bushmaster autocannon, that can be operated remotely, and four crew-served fifty caliber Browning machine guns. The cutters are equipped with a sophisticated modern sensor suite, that can share data with other vessels. The Sentinel class is equipped with a stern launching ramp, that can deploy and retrieve the vessel's 7-meter high-speed jet-boat, even when the vessels are underway. Only a single crewmember is required to remain on deck to deploy or retrieve the jet-boat.

Heriberto Hernandez was commissioned in her home port, San Juan, Puerto Rico, on October 16, 2015.

== Operational career ==
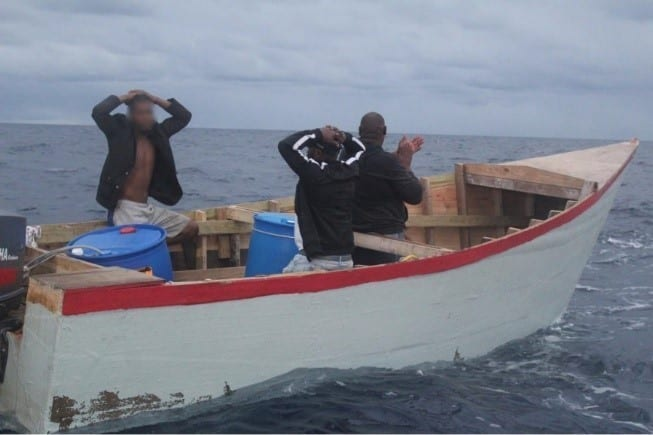
One of the complement of this unregistered vessel, apprehended by the Heriberto Hernandez, turned out to have an outstanding arrest warrant for murder.

In January, 2019, the Heriberto Hernandez apprehended a small vessel with 35 people aboard they determined were intending to illegally enter the United States. Near the vessel they also found a floating backpack containing $3.6 million worth of heroin. 27 of the vessel's occupants were turned over to the Dominican Republic, while the remaining 8 were turned over to the US Justice Department.

On January 5, 2021, while patrolling the Mona Passage, the Heriberto Hernandez sighted a suspicious vessel. The unregistered vessel, which seemed to be home-built, which had three men aboard, was found north of Desecheo Island. The crew of the Heriberto Hernandez deemed it unseaworthy, and took the men aboard. Biometric scans determined one of the men had an arrest warrant for a double murder in San Juan. The cutter rendezvoused with a vessel from the Dominican Navy, to pass over the other two men, who claimed to be Dominican citizens, and then handed over custody of the suspect to officials of the US Marshall Service in Mayaguez, Puerto Rico.

== Namesake ==
Like all of the cutters of her class she is named after someone who served in the Coast Guard, or one of its three precursor services, the United States Revenue Cutter Service, the United States Lighthouse Service or the United States Lifeboat Service, who was recognized for their heroism.

Heriberto Hernandez lost his life when he was a fireman on board a Point-class cutter, USCGC Point Cypress. Point Cypress was patrolling a river in South Vietnam, during the Vietnam War, when he died. He received a posthumous Bronze Star for valor.
