= Sunnova =

American solar energy company

Sunnova Energy International Inc.
- Type: Public
- Traded as: NYSE: NOVA
- Industry: Solar energy
- Founded: 2012; 14 years ago
- Founder: John Berger
- Defunct: 2025; 1 year ago
- Fate: Chapter 11 bankruptcy, all assets sold
- Headquarters: Houston, Texas, U.S.
- Products: Solar panel installations, Energy storage solutions
- Services: Solar energy as a service, Repair services
- Revenue: $1.4 billion (2023)
- Total assets: $3.2 billion (2023)
- Total equity: $1.8 billion (2023)
- Owner: Solaris Assets LLC
- Number of employees: 1,200 (2023)
- Website: www.sunnova.com

Sunnova Energy International Inc. was an American energy company that provides residential solar and energy storage services. Founded in 2012 and headquartered in Houston, Texas, it operates primarily in the United States, offering solar panel installations, battery storage, and repair services to homeowners and businesses.

== History ==
Founded in 2012 by William (John) Berger, it quickly expanded its operations across the U.S., focusing on providing affordable, reliable, and sustainable energy solutions to residential customers. Over the years, Sunnova has grown to become one of the leading residential solar service providers in the country.

In March 2025, when its stock plunged below $1 per share due to concerns about its financial condition, Berger resigned and Paul Mathews was named the company's new President and CEO. On June 5, it announced that it would lay off 55% of its workforce, or 718 employees, and its subsidiary, Sunnova TEP Developer, had filed for Chapter 11 bankruptcy protection.

On June 9, Sunnova filed for Chapter 11 bankruptcy protection, listing assets and liabilities between $10 billion and $50 billion. The company blamed its decision on high debt amounts and declining demand. In July 2025, the company sold its solar installation business to Omnidian for $7 million as part of a stalking horse deal.

In September 2025, it was announced that Solaris Assets LLC had completed the firm's acquisition. The company's Chapter 11 bankruptcy plan was approved by a U.S. bankruptcy judge in November 2025, which allowed to company to appoint a creditor to distribute the sale proceeds to creditors and manage the winding down of the company's remaining operations.

== Business model ==
Sunnova’s business model revolves around providing energy as a service (EaaS). The company offers solar panel installations, energy storage solutions, and various financing options, including solar leases and power purchase agreements (PPAs). This model allows homeowners to adopt solar energy with little to no upfront costs, paying instead for the energy produced by the solar systems over time.

== Products and services ==
- Solar panel installation: Sunnova provides customized solar energy systems for residential properties, including design, installation, and maintenance.
- Energy storage solutions: The company offers battery storage systems that allow homeowners to store excess solar energy for use during power outages or at night.
- Sunnova Repair Services (SRS): Sunnova provides comprehensive repair services for solar systems, ensuring long-term performance and reliability.
- Rooftop solar removal and reinstallation (R&R): Sunnova offers services for the removal and reinstallation of solar panels during roof repairs or replacements.

== Corporate governance ==
Sunnova is led by a team of experienced professionals in the energy sector. Paul Mathews serves as the CEO, with a board of directors that includes experts in finance, energy, and technology.

== Financial performance ==
The company went public in 2019, trading on the New York Stock Exchange under the ticker symbol "NOVA." Its financial performance was bolstered by increased demand for residential solar energy and energy storage solutions. Shares of company's stock fell by as much as 71% on March 3, 2025, following the release of its end-of-year financial results for 2024. The disclosure included a so-called “going concern” statement – a note warning investors that the company could run out of money to operate within the year; “substantial doubt exists regarding our ability to continue as a going concern for a period of at least one year,” the disclosure said.

Roughly $400 million of Sunnova’s $8.5 billion in debt was bought up by Oaktree Capital Management in purchases made across a couple days. As Sunnova prepares for negotiations with creditors, the purchases give Oaktree a significant role in the discussions.

== Controversies and criticism ==
Sunnova faced criticism and legal challenges, primarily related to customer service and contract disputes. However, the company has addressed these issues by improving its service offerings and customer support systems.

== Awards and recognition ==
Sunnova has received several industry accolades for its contributions to the renewable energy sector. The company has been recognized for its innovation in energy storage and its efforts to expand access to solar energy across the United States.
