= Edgewood Independent School District (Bexar County, Texas) =

School district in Texas, United States

Coordinates: 29.43197°N 98.5669°W

Edgewood Independent School District is a public school district based in San Antonio, in Bexar County, Texas (USA).

== History ==
The Edgewood district is most notable as the original plaintiff in a Texas court case which led to the "Robin Hood" school finance plan (which was itself later ruled unconstitutional). The district has sued the state government regarding its school financing since 1984.

In 2009, the school district was rated "academically acceptable" by the Texas Education Agency.

As of the 2012-2013 school year, the district had a school attendance rate of 93.9%, the lowest such rate of all of the San Antonio-area school districts. Joshua Fechter of the San Antonio Express-News stated "Comparatively speaking" that this rate "does not differ much from other area districts whose rates hovers between 94-98 percent."

In 2015, multiple administrators either resigned or learned that their contracts would not be renewed.

Circa 2016, the elected board could not agree on who should be superintendent nor who should be the principals of the district's high schools. The Texas Education Agency replaced the elected school board with its own managers around that time. Circa 2019, the agency was planning to allow a new elected board to take control. In 2019 it announced that it would take control of the district, vacating the elected board.

In November 2023, The Edgewood ISD Board of Trustees voted 5:1 to close E.T Wrenn Middle School and Winston Intermediate School of Excellence in Fall 2024. This decision was a cost savings move by the district due to years of declining enrollment.

== Geography ==
As of 2015, the school district is "property poor" which means the areas within the district are low income and generate relatively little property tax.

== Schools ==
High schools (grades 9-12)
Name	Established	Mascot	Colors	Additional information
Edgewood Fine Arts Academy	2001	Red Raiders	Red & Gray	Located in the previous Edgewood HS building
John F. Kennedy High School	1963	Rockets	Green, Silver, & Black	
Memorial High School	1967	Minutemen	Red, White, & Blue	

Middle schools (grades 6-8)
Name	Established	Mascot	Colors	Additional information
Brentwood Middle School	1965	Vikings	Black & Gold	Adjacent to Kennedy HS
Gus Garcia Middle School	1972	Chargers	Orange & Black	

Primary schools
Name	Grades	Established	Additional information
Cardenas Early Childhood Center	PK	1972	
Roy Cisneros Elementary School	PK-5	2009	Previous site of Cenizo Park ES
Gardendale Early Learning Program	PK-2	1949	
Henry B. Gonzalez Elementary School	PK-5	1968	
Lyndon B. Johnson Elementary School	PK-5	1964	
Las Palmas Leadership School for Girls	K-8	1955	
Loma Park Elementary School	PK-5	1953	
Alonso S. Perales Elementary School	PK-5	1978	Site of original Edgewood School
Roosevelt Elementary School	K-5	1957	Dual Language Academy
Stafford Early Childhood Center	PK	1931	
Stafford Elementary School	K-5	1931	Visual and Performing Arts

Former schools
Name	Established	Closed	Mascot	Colors	Additional information
Edgewood High School	1936	1996	Red Raiders	Red & Gray	1st stand-alone EHS opened in 1940; 2nd in 1954
Eleuterio Escobar Middle School	1958	1987			
Harry S. Truman Middle School	1960	2011	Eagles	Blue & White	Adjacent to Memorial HS
E.T. Wrenn Middle School	1968	2024	Hornets	Green & Black	
George Washington Carver School	1945	1957			
Cenizo Park Elementary	1953	2009			Replaced by Cisneros ES
Coronado Elementary	1952	2011			Originally Coronado ES; moved to Escobar MS campus in 1987 and renamed Coronado/Escobar ES
Edgewood Elementary School	1915	1978			
Emma Frey	1957				
Joseph M. Guerra Elementary	1953	2003			Originally Callaghan Road ES; burnt down and replaced in 1970 or 1971.
Regina Hoelscher Elementary	1961	2005	Little Rockets	Green & White	Adjacent to Brentwood MS
Lincoln Elementary	1956	1984			
Norman Winston Elementary	1952	2024	Eagles	Cyan & Yellow	Notable Alumni: Gloria Estefan

== Edge News ==
Edge News (formally "Edgewood On The Air") is the Edgewood Independent School District Local TV show which is broadcast on Time Warner Cable Ch. 98 On Saturdays and Sundays @ 4:30PM. The show started in the Fall of 2006. The show is taped monthly at the Edgewood Fine Arts Academy Studio and is under the direction of Edgewood Public Relations Director Mr. Mario Rios.
