= Ladies LULAC =

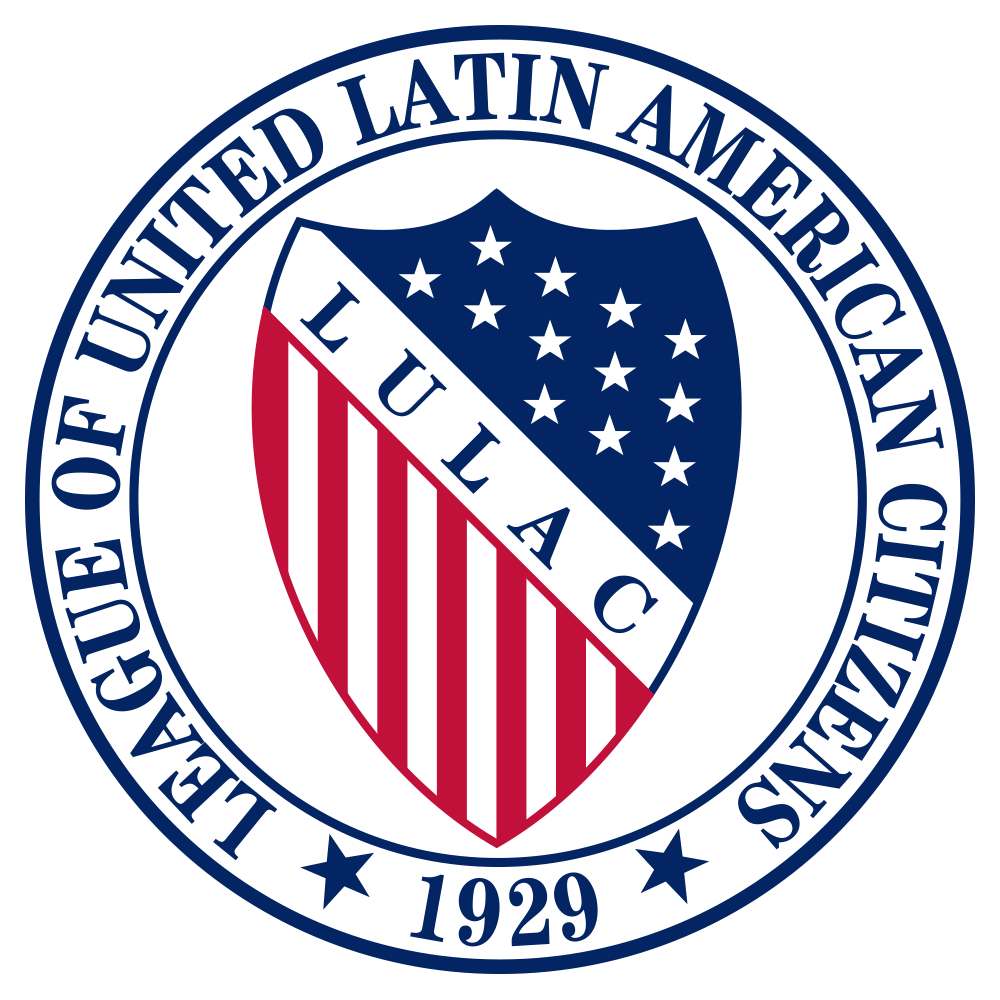
The seal of the League of United Latin American Citizens (LULAC). Women formed part of LULAC for most of its time but their participation was limited. Throughout the years, their involvement increased.

Ladies LULAC were the women's chapters, or councils, that were a part of the League of United Latin American Citizens (LULAC), which is the oldest and biggest civil rights organization for Hispanics or Latin Americans in Texas. Ladies LULAC councils were established during LULAC's annual convention in 1933. Ladies' chapters evolved from earlier women's auxiliaries and focused on issues affecting Mexican American communities, including education, voting rights, and social services. The group became national but remained strongest in Texas, with the number of chapters fluctuating over the decades. Women played different roles in activism, such as funding lawsuits against school segregation, registering voters, and supporting immigrant services. While separate from men's councils, Ladies LULAC often collaborated with them on major initiatives. By the late 20th century, membership declined as integrated councils became more common, though some women’s councils persisted.

== History ==
=== Women's participation in early LULAC ===
In the early 20th century, during the formation of LULAC, Mexican American women adhered to more traditional domestic roles. They were not expected to participate politically or in activism. Even spending time with a man a woman was not related to was uncommon and discouraged. Other than social expectations, like marriage and mother roles, women were restricted by lack of education and occupational inequality. Only few Texan women graduated high school or worked outside the home. Those who were in the workforce held jobs that would not allow them to take time off, unlike their male counterparts. Historian Cynthia Orozco explains how early Mexican Americans' religion and patriarchal society left politics to be dominated by the men. However, she has discovered women were contributing to the fight for civil rights even before they were permitted to participate through women's chapters in 1933.

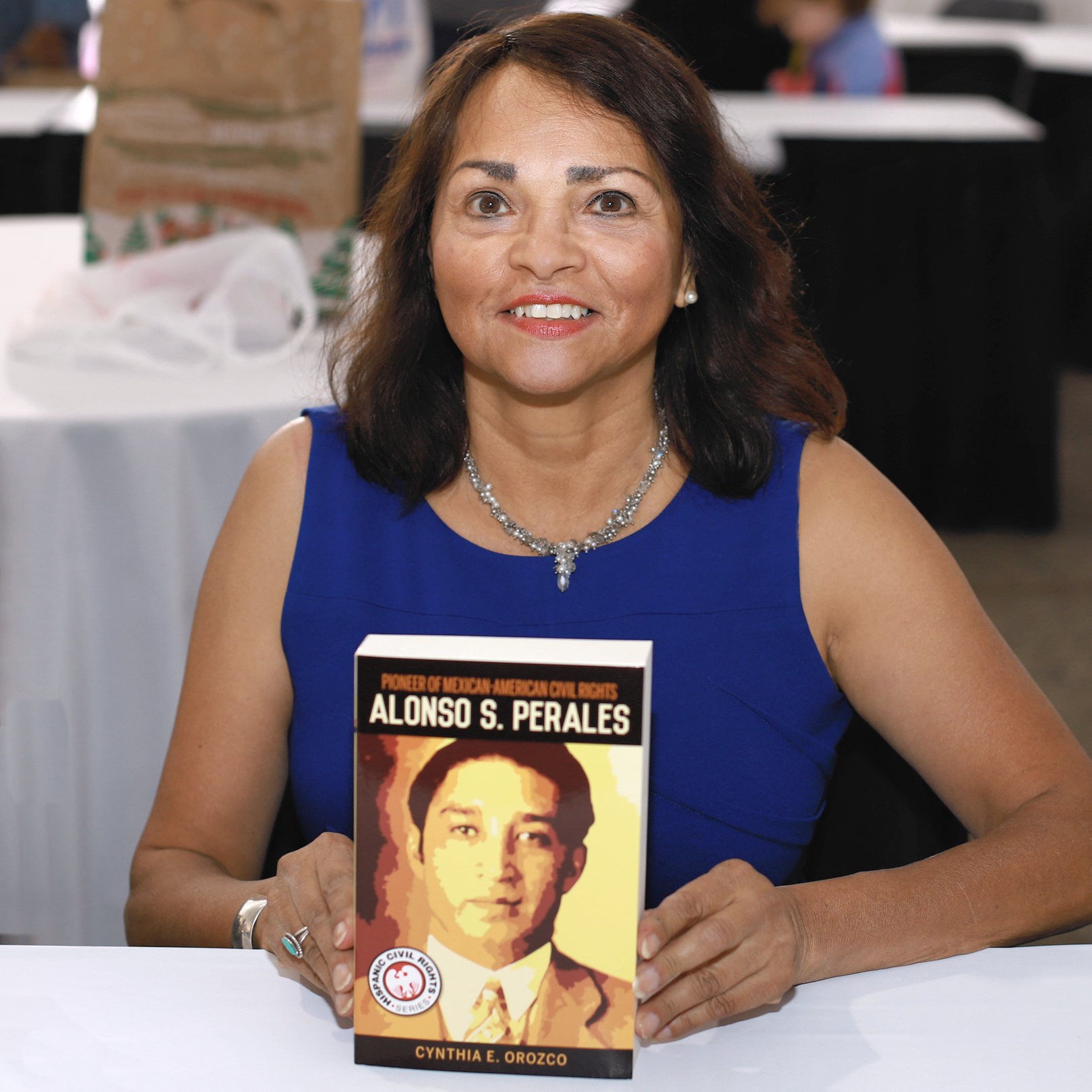
Picture of historian Cynthia Orozco, who has compiled information on LULAC's history, including the involvement of women.

Memoirs and statements written by women like Adela Sloss-Vento suggest women were involved politically. Sloss-Vento was a writer; she wrote a biography of male leader Alonso Perales. In her book, she explained how she joined the early leaders to "help" and "collaborate" with them. Her contributions included writing letters to newspapers, excerpts for LULAC News, and speeches. Her writings denounced fascism, attacked hatred against descendants of Mexican blood, and asked that the press and law be used to bring unity among the races in schools. Additionally, she worked with the Good Government League, organized a benefit with Zacarias Gonzales in 1931 for the Salvatierra v. Del Rio Independent School District lawsuit, and, in 1933, became part of a ladies' auxiliary for LULAC in Alice, Texas.

Another woman who left proof of her involvement in LULAC's early days was Adelaida Garza. In a publication for LULAC's 50th anniversary, Garza wrote in a statement that her and other women were responsible for asking for clothing and food donations and being a help to their husbands in political action. An image from the 1931 LULAC annual convention shows Garza with other women attending an official meeting, though women were not invited to attend.

=== Women's chapters ===
Many Mexican American men, including a majority of those in LULAC membership, believed women not abandon their homes, thinking that society depended on the success of the families and homes. However, the work being done in LULAC was focused on the equality for Mexican American men, and did not address the needs of the women. Prior to 1930, involvement of women was difficult to find, aside from participation in mutualistas, community-based mutual aid societies created by Mexican immigrants. Some mutualistas included women and few were for only women; and these mostly focused on charity, or religious or social purposes, rather than political or feminist ones. In contrast, Euro-American women's roles were changing, moving towards more freedom and progress.

LULAC, from the beginning, encouraged a balance between remembering one's culture/origins and assimilating to the American culture. It urged its members to learn English and understand the American system. As a result of this acculturation in these organizations, Mexican American women were Americanizing the idea of what they could be: they were more educated and career-focused than earlier Mexican-American women in the middle class. A few years after LULAC was founded, in 1932, women were allowed to participate through auxiliaries; these began in San Antonio, Kingsville, and Alice, Texas.

In 1933, at the statewide annual convention for LULAC, lawyer Joe V. Alamia and J. M. Canales moved to establish Ladies LULAC. The convention agreed women could start to organize in the same manner as men. The first ladies' chapter was organized in Alice, Texas, where a ladies' auxiliary already existed. Jose de la Luz Saenz was appointed the first organizer for Ladies LULAC.

Ladies' councils approached their structure similarly to how men's councils did, with exception of a few things. They were a help to the Spanish-Speaking Parent-Teachers Association. Later in 1933, LULAC created the official position of Ladies' Organizer General. Some of the Texan women to take this role were Estefana Valdez from 1934–35, Gladstone Swain from 1936–38, Ester Machuca from 1938-39, and Della Hernandez from 1938-40. Ladies' chapters spread to the whole nation, but remained strongest in Texas. The position of ladies' organizer general no longer existed after World War II.

Ladies LULAC councils focused on supporting and helping the poor, children, the elderly, and women. They also participated in politics, unlike groups and clubs women were allowed to be a part in years before. They mostly worked independently instead of working with other women's or men's councils. Some of their accomplishments throughout Ladies LULAC's time include:

- established chapters for the youth, called Junior LULAC councils
- pushed for Mexican-descent students to be admitted into public schools in Goliad (1934)
- gathered funds for the Delgado v. Bastrop Independent School District lawsuit (1948)
- purchased eyeglasses for students in Houston schools
- registered people to vote
- collected poll taxes
- organized Project Amistad in El Paso, a program to protect the elderly
- created the LULAC Information and Referral Center, helping immigrants and others with residency and employment or other needs
- collaborated with men's chapters for fundraising events and the LULAC conventions

=== Opposition and women leadership ===
A few years after Ladies LULAC councils were formed, many men in LULAC argued against the effectiveness of ladies' chapters; they may have been concerned about women abandoning their home responsibilities for civil rights work. These men proposed that Ladies LULAC either be terminated or return to the ladies' auxiliaries, detailing that they believed that the ladies' councils were not contributing enough. Women responded with an essay in their newsletter, detailing the changes they were making. LULAC continued to spread more ladies' councils throughout the Southwest. The league expressed appreciation and their desire for more women to participate in LULAC's efforts. In a LULAC newsletter in 1937, they wrote their concern for dormant councils, especially men's councils, and said that only four out of 15 ladies' chapters had presented themselves at the previous annual convention. They asked that women come to the rescue, reactivate councils, and strive to create new women's councils.

Though women were honorary members of LULAC and participated in councils, they were not allowed to vote in the league or be in positions of executive leadership. Very few councils included both men and women; most of them remained separate by gender. Though women contributed to their communities, they were more involved in events that related closely to "traditional women roles," like working with orphanages and health clinics, donating clothes and toys to children in poverty, and hosting youth events.

Some feminist women, like Alice Dickerson Montemayor and Esther Machuca, pushed for women to hold national leadership positions. Alice became the first woman to hold a nationally elected role in LULAC, which was not specifically for women, when she was selected Second National Vice President of LULAC in 1937, the third highest post of the entire organization. She was also the first woman to serve as an associate editor of LULAC News.

Lucy Acosta became the first woman to hold the position of National Director for youth events in 1963. In 1965 she was appointed Second National Vice President. Belen Robles became National Secretary in 1964 and stayed in leadership until 1970. She was also the first woman to run for LULAC National Office. In 1976, the first woman was selected as Texas LULAC State Director, Dolores Adame Guerrero.

Dr. Anita del Rio was the second woman to ever run for LULAC national presidency. She ran against Oscar Moran in the mid-1980s. Her campaign focused on bilingual education, immigration reform, and women. This election brought about controversy because Moran won, despite their platforms being very similar. At the time, LULAC membership was made up of 50% women, but women only made up 2% of the league's leadership. Females responded in a survey, and Del Rio commented, that Hispanic culture influenced the reasoning for women not holding leadership positions.

=== The decline of Ladies LULAC chapters ===
Ladies LULAC was at its strongest during the years leading up to World War II. However, the number of councils fluctuated; it was normally the urban ones that remained. In the mid-1980s, men were attacked for not allowing women in their councils. They began allowing men into women's councils, and the amount of integrated chapters rose. In 1990, fewer than ten Ladies LULAC councils existed in Texas, including Council #9, which was the only one that had begun during the 1930s. According to the LULAC website, "only a handful" of ladies' chapters existed by the year 2000.

== Key woman figures ==
=== Adela Sloss-Vento ===
Adela Sloss-Vento was born on September 27, 1901. She graduated from Pharr-San Juan-Alamo High School in 1927. Those who graduated with her described her as "brilliant" and "one of the smartest girls." She worked as a secretary in a mayor's office in the 1930s. She married Pedro Vento, who she would work with in political activist efforts.

Historian Cynthia Orozco describes Sloss-Vento as an "agent of change" during the beginnings of LULAC. She was a great help to Alonso Perales, who she wrote a biography on when she was older, and she wrote many letters and pieces for newspapers. In 1934, she wrote a feminist essay for LULAC News titled "Porque en muchos hogares latinos no existe la verdadera felicidad," which in English means "Why True Happiness Does Not Exist in Many Latino Homes."

Though Sloss-Vento did not acknowledge her role in the founding of LULAC in her own writings, she was recognized by others of her time. Author Marta Perez Perales wrote in 1977 about Sloss-Vento's activism in her book. Sloss-Vento was compared to Mexican heroine Josefa Ortiz de Dominguez by activist Roberto Austin from Mission, Texas. She died on April 4, 1998; In McAllen's Monitor, they wrote a tribute to her and called her "a founding member of LULAC."

=== Esther Nieto Machuca ===
Esther Machuca, born October 10, 1895, in Ojinaga, Chihuahua, Mexico, was a national organizer for women in LULAC. She was a charter member and the first treasurer of Ladies LULAC. After the chapter disbanded in 1936 due to lack of support from national male officers, she helped reorganize it and later became Ladies LULAC organizer general in 1938, expanding the organization nationally. She also led the production of the May 1939 LULAC News issue, the only edition entirely created by women. Machuca remained active in Ladies LULAC and other civic organizations until her death in 1980.

=== Alice Dickerson Montemayor ===
Alice, or Alicia, Dickerson Montemayor was born on August 6, 1902 in Laredo, Texas. Unlike many of her generation, she grew up in a bilingual home and gained a higher education. After graduating high school in 1924, she spent a year going to Laredo Business College night school. She later went to night school for two years in Laredo Junior College, in 1947.

Alice began participating civically around 1937. During her life of activism, she was also a wife, mother, and businesswoman. She dedicated herself to LULAC, though her husband did not. Montemayor helped establish a council in Laredo in 1936. This council was one of those that contributed the most during its time: encouraging women to aspire to work, be citizens, and vote. Among the council's accomplishments were raising funds to help people after a flood and being a support for children by donating to an orphanage and poor Mexican-American children and helping defend a mother of a second-grader who had been whipped by his teacher.

Dickerson was the first woman in LULAC history to hold a national leadership position that was not created for a woman: Second National Vice-President. She was also the first woman to serve as an associate editor of LULAC News and the first person to write a charter to sponsor a Junior LULAC chapter. During her time in these positions, she used her roles to fight for the needs of women and youth. Dickerson was also known for the feminist essays she wrote and published.

=== List of more women ===
- Lucy Acosta: She was the first woman to hold the position of National Director for youth events in 1963. In 1965, she was appointed Second National Vice President. In 1987, Acosta was recognized in the Texas Women's Hall of Fame.
- Belen Robles: Robles was the first woman to run for office in national presidency of LULAC. She had been National Secretary from 1964-1970. She later became LULAC National President in 1994.
- Adelaida Garza: During the early years of LULAC, she helped her husband Bernardo Garza, who was president of LULAC, in his civic work. She dedicated her time to LULAC efforts by helping raise funds and organize for Council #1.
- Carolina de Luna: A contemporary of Adelaida Garza, Carolina de Luna was the wife of Andres de Luna, Sr., who was national secretary of LULAC. She did a lot of his administrative work.
