= Mexican-American Segregation From 1910-1980 =

Mexican-American segregation refers to the separation of Mexican-American students in public schools in the Southwest region of the United States from the early to mid-twentieth century. Because Mexican-American segregation was enforced through a combination of local policies and state laws, legal challenges became necessary to challenge its enforcement and define the application of civil rights to Mexican-American students.

== Historical Background (1910-1930) ==
During the early twentieth century, the population of Mexican-American residents in the United States began to increase significantly, especially in the Southwest. Between 1910 and 1930, over one million Mexicans migrated to the United States to escape political and economic instabilities that came from the Mexican Revolution. Mexicans were also motivated to migrate due to growing labor opportunities in agriculture and industry that was promised by American companies. This migration contributed to a rapid growth of Mexican communities across the region.

As Mexican-American populations grew, segregation in public education gradually developed across many parts of the Southwest. Mexican-American children increasingly became educated in separate classrooms commonly referred to as “Mexican schools.” These schools were often unequal in quality to those provided for White students. Many scholars say that these schools may have been tied to broader Americanization efforts, and these scholars indicate that policymakers viewed segregation as a way to assimilate Mexican children into Anglo-American culture. In many districts around the country, segregation was reinforced by residential boundaries and local school policies.

== State-by-State Segregation and Legal Challenges (1930-1980) ==
Between 1930 and 1980, the segregation of Mexican-American students differed across states, and it was technically permitted because it was enforced through local school policies rather than explicit state laws. These practices have often operated through informal mechanisms, such as student assignment policies, language classifications, and district boundaries, all of which allowed segregation to persist without clear legal definition. As a result, legal challenges became necessary to confront these practices and establish clearer constitutional limits. Cases fought by Mexican-American families and organizations sought not only to end unequal conditions, but also to define when and how segregation violated the Equal Protection Clause. Over time, these cases helped define the application of principles established in Brown v. Board of Education to Mexican-American students.

== Texas ==
=== Del Rio ISD v. Salvatierra (1930) ===
One of the earliest challenges to the practice of segregating Mexican-American students in Texas was the Del Rio ISD v. Salvatierra case (1930). Jesús Salvatierra and other Mexican-American parents sought to prevent the expansion of segregated schooling in their school district. Though the appellate judge initially favored the argument, the Texas Court of Civil Appeals ultimately decided to allow the continuation of segregation based on purposes of school instruction and pedagogy, claiming that there was no evident intent of discrimination based on race. Salvatierra's case caused significant growth in the League of United Latin American Citizens (LULAC), an organization committed to fighting segregation.

=== Delgado v. Bastrop ISD (1948) ===
Until the late 1940s, Mexican-American students in Texas attended separate schooling with fewer resources, in which they prioritized job-related training. The League of United Latin American Citizens (LULAC), with lawyer Gustavo C. Garcia, filed the Delgado v. Bastrop ISD case on behalf of Mexican-American families. In 1948, the Court ruled segregation in a public school system based on national origin was unlawful. Judge Ben C. Rice ordered schools to stop segregation by 1949. However, he did allow students to be placed in separate classes temporarily if they needed help learning English, as long as standardized tests were used to determine need.

=== Cisneros v. Corpus Christi ISD (1970) ===
Jose Cisneros noticed the inequalities his children faced in their education as Mexican-American students, so with the support of his Steel Workers Union, he filed a class action lawsuit against the district. In the Cisneros v. Corpus Christi ISD (1970) case, it was ruled that Mexican-Americans, for the first time, were recognized as an identifiable minority group for the purposes of school segregation, which expanded the legal framework established in earlier decades. The court ruled that ideas from Brown v. Board of Education applied to both Black and Latino students. Judge Woodrow B. Seals ultimately ruled in favor of Cisnero's claim and ordered the district to change its practices to end segregation.

== California ==
=== Alverez v. Lemon Grove School District (1931) ===
In 1931, a separate elementary school facility in the Lemon Grove district was built, and all students of Mexican descent were required to attend. Originally, the segregation was justified by the school board because it was supposed to benefit those trying to learn English. The new school, which was located in the Mexican barrio, was inferior and hastily equipped compared to the existing school that was attended by White students. About eighty-five Mexican-American students were affected by the policy, and this motivated families to organize a boycott and pursue legal action. In Alverez v Lemon Grove School District, the court ruled in favor of the plaintiffs, determining that the segregation was determined based on Latinized names and not language ability. Judge Claude Chambers ordered that the Mexican students immediately be included in the previously integrated school. In doing so, he rejected the school board's justification that segregation was necessary for the education of non-English speaking children.

In scholarship, this case is seen as one of the earliest successful legal challenges to school segregation in the United States. This case is frequently cited as an early precedent for later desegregation in the Southwest.

=== Mendez et al., v. Westminster School District of Orange County et al. (1946) ===
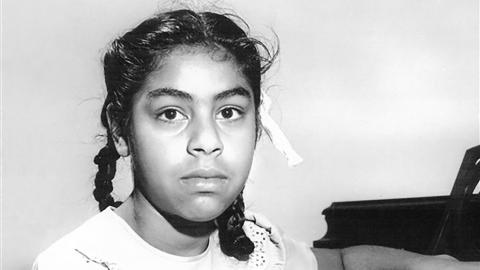
Sylvia Mendez, the daughter of plaintiffs Gonzalo and Felicitas Méndez, one of five families that filed the class action lawsuit. The case overturned racial segregation in California schools.

Mendez v. Westminster was a case that took place in Orange Country, California from 1945-1947. The lawsuit was filed because school officials required children of Mexican descent to attend separate schools in several districts across the county, while white or “American” children were allowed to enroll in neighborhood schools. In March 1945, five families (Mendez, Guzman, Estrada, Palomino, and Ramirez) representing approximately 5,000 Mexican-American children filed a class action federal lawsuit against four school districts (Westminster, Santa Ana, Garden Grove, and El Modena). In this lawsuit, they argued that segregation violated the Equal Protection Clause of the Fourteenth Amendment. The U.S. District Court ruled in favor of the plaintiffs in 1946, acknowledging that segregation of Mexican-American students was not supported by California Law. The decision was upheld on appeal by the United States Court of Appeals for the Ninth Circuit in April 1947.

Scholars view this ruling as a significant development in the legal challenge to school segregation. Even though the decision did not directly overturn the doctrine of "separate but equal," it established that the segregation of Mexican-American students was a form of ethnic/racial discrimination and therefore unlawful.

== Arizona ==
=== Gonzales v. Sheely (1951) ===
Gonzales v. Sheely was another case in which parents of Mexican-American students challenged the segregation of their children into separate schools. On March 26, 1951, Judge David Ling of the U.S. District Court for Arizona ruled that segregation based on race or ethnicity violated the Equal Protections Clause of the Fourteenth Amendment. This case came after earlier lawsuits such as Mendez v. Westminster, and it had a similar ruling. Scholars suggest that this case was different because it was the first case in which the court identified racism in segregation.

== Colorado ==
=== Keyes v. School District No. 1 (1973) ===
In Colorado, a major turning point came with the Keyes v. School District No. 1 (1973) case, in which the United States Supreme Court addressed intentional segregation in the Denver School system. On June 21, 1973, the Court determined that the segregation was intentional, and they decided that evidence of deliberate segregation for a school system could justify broader desegregation remedies across the district, broadening the range of constitutional protections beyond the South. This decision promoted an important shift in recognizing de facto segregation, and it established important precedent for addressing segregation outside traditionally recognized Jim Crow systems.

== Legacy ==
=== Legal Impact ===
The above cases contributed to how the courts applied constitutional protection in public education. Early cases attempting to desegregate schools relied on arguments that Mexican-Americans were legally classified as white, so they could not technically be segregated under existing law. But, cases in each state helped shift legal strategies toward broader claims under the Equal Protection Clause in the fourteenth amendment. By the late 1940s, courts began to recognize Mexican-Americans as a separate minority group that were entitled to equal protection.

=== Continued Segregation ===
Despite court rulings, segregation of Mexican-American students did not immediately end. In several regions across the United States, there were many schools who continued to segregate through the same administrative practices as before, such as student assignment policies and the use of language-based classifications through the 1980s. Issues like this continue today. There are ongoing arguments today on whether this kind of segregation should be ruled as de jure segregation or de facto segregation in courts. Conditions like these have led to continuing efforts by organizations to challenge segregation.
