= Adela Sloss Vento =

American writer (1901–1998)

- Born: Adela Sloss; September 27, 1901; Karnes City, Texas
- Died: April 4, 1998 (aged 96); Edinburg, Texas
- Known for: Writer
- Spouse: Pedro C. Vento
- Children: Irma Dora Vento, Arnoldo Carlos Vento

Adela Sloss-Vento (c. 27 September 1901 - 4 April 1998) was born Karnes City, Texas to Anselma Garza and David Henry Sloss. As a young American woman of Mexican descent, she was determined to become a writer, hailing from southern Texas, educated in San Juan, later lived in Corpus Christi during World War II, and then settled in Edinburg, she used her pen as weapon for more than sixty years, countering racial discrimination and exploitation of laborers, all the while championing the civil rights of Mexican Americans through the written word.

Sloss-Vento comes from a merging of cultures. Her mother, Anselma Garza Zamora, was Mexican/Spanish/Native American and nursed her community as a curandera (healer) and as a midwife. Her father, David Henry Sloss, was of German (father) and Mexican/Spanish/Native American (mother) descent. Her father left when she was seven and her mother raised four children in Southern Texas, along the border where people moved freely back and forth over a line that was virtually invisible prior the official establishment of US Border Patrol in 1924. She was an American woman, culturally, geographically, and politically shaped by the dynamic amalgamation of people, places, and ideas.

== Background ==
In 1927, when she graduated from Pharr-San Juan High School it was nearly unheard of for women to do so. By today's standards, the level of education she obtained would be considered equivalent to that of a college degree. As a uniquely qualified high school graduate, she acquired respectable employment from the city of San Juan, as a clerk for the mayor. While working in the office of the mayor, she began her civic responsibilities involving herself with the Good Neighbor League, whose objective was to stop the perpetual corruption occurring within that city office. Her writing career truly began with her initial letter to Alonso S. Perales following the 1927 Harlingen Convention. She declared her commitment to the cause and praised his endeavors to rally the many political and civic groups around the state as one. With her support of Perales, she was afforded the opportunity to work also with J. T. Canales and Jose de la Luz Saenz, compiling records of discrimination. It was at this time that she began writing politically charged articles for Spanish language newspapers in the Rio Grande Valley. After the formation of LULAC in 1929, Sloss-Vento and Zacarias Gonzales arranged an event raising funds for the first lawsuit against segregation, Del Rio ISD v. Salvatierra. Throughout her life, Sloss-Vento always identified herself as a helper, never a leader, but author Cynthia Orozco explicates that her peers recognized her differently, "As early as 1931, La Prensa called her 'a well-known resident of the Rio Grande Valley in Texas.'"

Adela Sloss wed Pedro C. Vento in 1935. Her husband endorsed her collaboration and encouraged her continued work with the Chicano Movement. The pair resided in Corpus Christi while Pedro Vento worked as a security officer at the Corpus Christi Naval Air Station during World War II. Moving to Edinburg, Texas at the war's end, employed by Hidalgo County, where Adela Sloss-Vento filled the position of jail matron and Pedro served as a guard in the county jail. It was in Edinburg that they started a family, raising two children, a daughter, Irma Dora Vento, and a son, Arnoldo Carlos Vento. She raised funds for the Texas Good Relations Association through membership drives. Her relentless activist endeavors kept her busy in her community and the surrounding regional areas.

Adela Sloss-Vento retired from the Hidalgo County Jail in 1955 and as her health limited her mobility she continued working from home, writing letters and articles. In the 1960s, according to her son, she "understood her importance as an archivist." Sloss-Vento began compiling documents about Perales and conveyed her eagerness for his biography to be written by someone like attorney Gustavo Garcia. In 1968, she was recognized with a Pioneer Award at the Fifth Annual Statewide LULAC Founder’s Pioneers and Awards Banquet in San Antonio for her lifetime devotion to the cause. She made her most significant mark with her book written in honor of a leader of LULAC, Alonso S. Perales: His Struggle for the Rights of Mexican Americans (1977).

== Life as a writer ==
Adela Sloss-Vento corresponded with local political leaders like Alonso S. Perales, J. T. Canales, Jose de la Luz Saenz, and Hector P. Garcia in support of Mexican American civil rights. She wrote letters to President Truman, President Eisenhower, President Carter, and Vice President Lyndon B. Johnson about the sociological, political, and economic issues of the day, along with ideas of possible solutions for the problems at hand. She composed over 100 articles for newspapers during the course of her lifetime in English and in Spanish. Sloss-Vento was a consistent proponent of Bilingualism. She was published in the following periodicals: Diogenes (McAllen, TX), La Prensa (San Antonio, TX), LULAC News, Brownsville Herald, La Verdad, El Manana (Mexico), Corpus Christi Caller, Houston Chronicle, San Antonio Express-News, and McAllen Monitor. One of her most notable articles spoke out against machismo, titled "Why There is No True Happiness in Latino Homes," in the early 1930s before she was married. She wrote poetry as well. Sloss-Vento's papers are not yet part of a library collection, they are currently housed in the possession of her son, Arnoldo C. Vento. In addition to her son, Sloss-Vento's work has been studied and written about by Cynthia E. Orozco, with a book titled Agent of Change: Adela Sloss-Vento, Mexican American Civil Rights Activist and Texas Feminist.

While Adela Sloss-Vento considered herself an advocate of the male leaders of the Mexican-American civil rights movement and sung their praises in the name of the cause, she never identified herself as a leader. She minimized her involvement yet clearly she was much more of a pioneer than she realized. She did not distinguish herself as a feminist, but her actions and the written record that she left behind satisfy the very definition of what is considered feminist. As her methods were polite and subtle, the assertion of her voice in the actions she took to claim space - her graduation from high school, her employment within the city government, her civic involvement, as well as the ardent voice she gives to her community through her writing - are all forms of outward confirmation of the crusader within. She wrote letters to the leaders of local civil-rights organizations, governors, congressmen, presidents of the United States, and the president of Mexico. Her written word was published in multiple Spanish and English newspapers throughout her adult life. As a patriotic American of Mexican descent, she was devoted to bringing light to the issues of racial discrimination and labor exploitation of Mexican Americans. Her actions in the late 1920s and early 1930s mark the beginning of a shift for women. Archival evidence contained within her papers signifies the rudimentary materialization of the Chicana movement to come and she is a noted forerunner as such by scholars today.
