= Bowie High School (El Paso, Texas) =

Public high school in El Paso, Texas, United States

Coordinates: 31.7657°N 106.4587°W

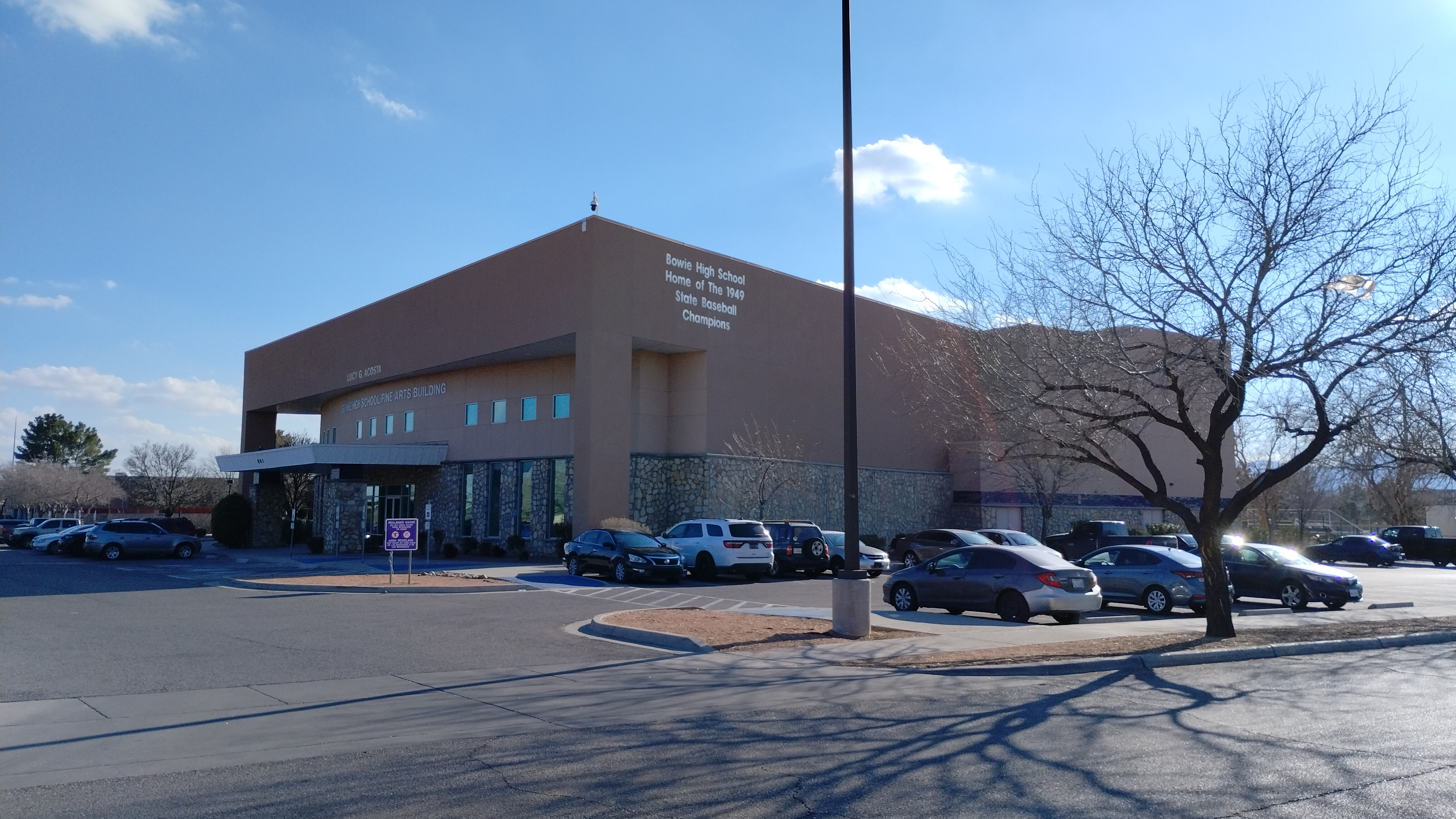
- 801 S. San Marcial Street; El Paso, Texas 79905; United States

Information
- Type: Public
- Motto: Once A Bear, Always a Bear
- Established: 1927
- Principal: Rosaura Gandarilla
- Staff: 70.11 (on an FTE basis)
- Grades: 9-12
- Enrollment: 1,007 (2023–24)
- Student to teacher ratio: 14.36
- Colors: Royal blue and white
- Mascot: Bear
- Website: www.episd.org/bowie

Bowie High School is one of the oldest operating high schools in El Paso, Texas and is part of the El Paso Independent School District. It is located in the Chamizal neighborhood in the South Central part of the city next to the border with Mexico, not far from the Bridge of the Americas linking El Paso with Ciudad Juarez, across San Marcial Street from Chamizal National Memorial.

Bowie High serves Downtown El Paso and the western half of South Central (also known as South) El Paso; its attendance zone is roughly defined by Interstate 10 on the north, the Rio Grande on the south and west, and Luna Street on the east. It is fed by Guillen Middle School and the elementary schools in its feeder pattern include Aoy, Beall, Douglass, and Hart. Bowie High also hosts a magnet program for business and international relations, International Business Academy, which opened in 2003 and draws students from throughout the district. It was named for Texas Revolution hero and Alamo defender James Bowie.

== History ==
Bowie High School was founded in 1927 to relieve overpopulation at El Paso High School. The first school building still exists on South Cotton Street at Sixth Avenue in the Segundo Barrio (Second Ward) section of South-Central El Paso; it is now Guillen Middle School. Bowie High was eventually relocated to its current location as a result of restructuring in South El Paso.

Prior to 1964, the land on which Bowie High sits was Mexican territory. The land became United States territory as a result of the American–Mexican Chamizal Convention Act of 1964 which resolved the longstanding Chamizal dispute.

== Athletics ==
- Baseball, 1948 State Champions
- Tennis
- Boys' and girls' basketball
- Cross country, 1979 State Champions (boys), 1986 State Champions (girls)
- Football
- Boys' and girls' soccer
- Softball
- Swimming
- Track and field
- Volleyball
- Wrestling

== Notable alumni ==
- Lucy G. Acosta, activist with the League of United Latin American Citizens
- Blanca Enriquez, director of Head Start
- Ambrosio Guillen, Medal of Honor recipient
- Javier Montez, 1952 Summer Olympics athlete
- Gregoria Ortega, activist and religious sister
- Nolan Richardson, NCAA Men's Division I Basketball Championship coach
- Belen Robles, national president of the League of United Latin American Citizens
