= Cynthia Orozco =

Historian

Cynthia Ann Orozco
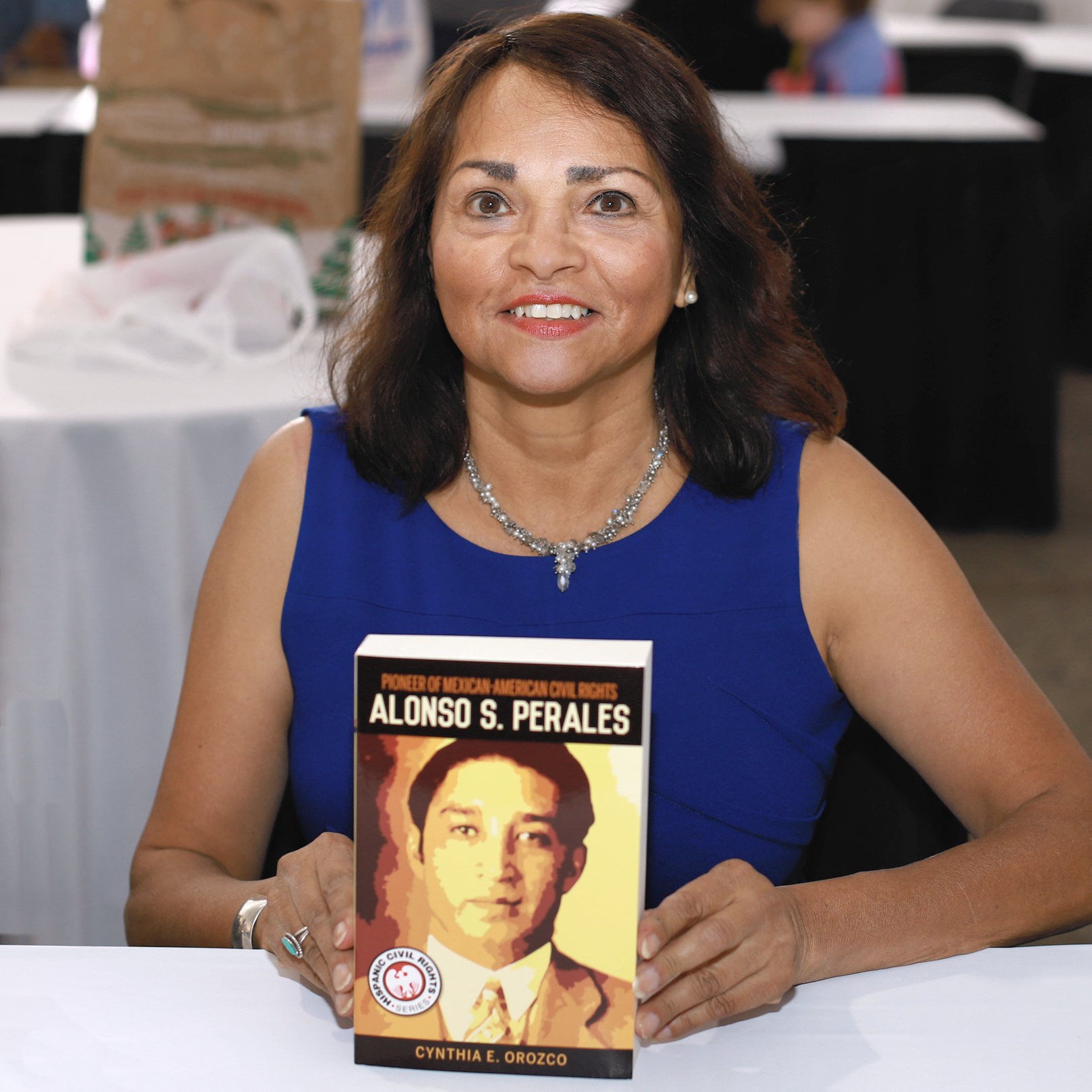
- Orozco at the 2022 Texas Book Festival.
- Born: Cuero, Texas, U.S.

Academic background
- Education: University of Texas, Austin (BA); University of California, Los Angeles (MA) (PhD)
- Thesis: The origins of the League of United Latin American Citizens (LULAC) and the Mexican American civil rights movement in Texas with an analysis of women's political participation in a gendered context, 1910-1929 (1992)
- Influences: Adela Sloss-Vento

Academic work
- Institutions: Eastern New Mexico University, Ruidoso
- Main interests: Mexican American women, League of United Latin American Citizens (LULAC)

Cynthia Ann Orozco (also Cynthia E. Orozco) is a professor of history and humanities at Eastern New Mexico University known for her work establishing the field of Chicana studies.

== Early life and education ==
Orozco was born in Cuero, Texas to community activist and writer Aurora E. Orozco and Primitivo Orozco. Orozco attended Southwest Texas State University, and graduated from the University of Texas at Austin. Orozco earned her Ph.D. from the University of California, Los Angeles in 1992.

== Career ==
Orozco is known for her work in Chicana Studies. Orozco's work has been discussed by Ernesto Chávez who described the history of the movement in his 2013 article, and by Sonia Hernández in her 2015 article on Mexican(a) labor history. She served as a coordinator of the Women’s Unit of the Chicano Studies Research Center which advanced Chicana Studies courses and research at the University of California, Los Angeles. She authored “Getting Started in Chicano Studies” for a women's studies journal, and co-founded the Chicana Caucus of National Association for Chicano Studies. Orozco spoke at the 1984 conference in Austin, its first conference focused on women, and the resulting essay “Sexism in Chicano Studies” was published in Chicana Voices.

Orozco has taught at Eastern New Mexico University in Ruidoso since 2000 where she advocated for the establishment of tenure as university policy. She wrote No Mexicans, Women or Dogs Allowed: The Rise of the Mexican American Civil Rights Movement, the first scholarly history of the origins of the League of United Latin American Citizens (LULAC). The book was reviewed by multiple journals. Orozco has written about the activist Adela Sloss-Vento, in a book that was reviewed by other journals. In 2020, Orozco published a book about the civil rights activist Alonso Perales.

== Awards and honors ==
In 2012 the Texas State Historical Association named Orozco a fellow, and New Mexico League of United Latin American Citizens named her Educator of the Year. In 2015, she was one of the 'emerging leaders' named by the American Library Association. In 2018, she received the Eastern New Mexico University-Ruidoso National Society of Leadership and Success "Excellence in Teaching Award". In 2020, her book Agent of Change received the Liz Carpenter award from the Texas State Historical Association.

== Selected publications ==
- Orozco, Cynthia (2009). No Mexicans, women, or dogs allowed : the rise of the Mexican American civil rights movement (1st ed.). Austin: University of Texas Press. ISBN 978-0-292-79343-9. OCLC 501017354.
- Zamora, Emilio; Orozco, Cynthia; Rocha, Rodolfo, eds. (2000). Mexican Americans in Texas history : selected essays. Austin: Texas State Historical Association. ISBN 978-0876111741.
- OROZCO, CYNTHIA E. (2022). AGENT OF CHANGE : Adela Sloss-Vento, mexican american civil rights activist and texas feminist. [S.l.]: UNIV OF TEXAS PRESS. ISBN 978-1-4773-1987-1. OCLC 1268983231.
- OROZCO, CYNTHIA E. (2020). PIONEER OF MEXICAN-AMERICAN CIVIL RIGHTS : Alonso S. Perales. [Place of publication not identified]: ARTE PUBLICO. ISBN 978-1-55885-896-1. OCLC 1127937934.
- Orozco, Cynthia (April 23, 2014). "Sexism in Chicano Studies and the Community". In Garcia, Alma M. (ed.). Chicana Feminist Thought: The Basic Historical Writings. Routledge. ISBN 978-1-134-71974-7.
