= Ada Maria Isasi-Diaz =

American Catholic theologian and academic (1943–2012)

Ada María Isasi-Díaz
- Born: March 22, 1943; Havana, Cuba
- Died: May 13, 2012 (aged 69); New York, U.S.

Academic background
- Education: College of New Rochelle; State University of New York at Brockport; Union Theological Seminary
- Thesis: En la Lucha / In the Struggle (1990)
- Influences: Katie Cannon; Beverly Wildung Harrison; Delores Williams

Academic work
- Discipline: Theology
- Sub-discipline: Christian ethics
- School or tradition: Liberation theology; mujerista theology
- Institutions: Drew University
- Notable ideas: Mujerista theology
- Website: users.drew.edu/aisasidi

Ada María Isasi-Díaz (March 22, 1943 – May 13, 2012) was a Cuban-American theologian who served as professor emerita of ethics and theology at Drew University in Madison, New Jersey. As a Hispanic theologian, she was an innovator of Hispanic theology in general and specifically of mujerista theology. She was founder and co-director of the Hispanic Institute of Theology at Drew University until her retirement in 2009.

== Early life and education ==
Born on March 22, 1943, Isasi-Díaz was born and raised in Havana, Cuba, to a Catholic family. Her parents were Josefina Díaz Isasi and Domingo G. Isasi-Battle. She graduated from Merici Academy in 1960 and arrived in the United States as a political refugee later that year. She entered the Order of St. Ursula and earned a Bachelor of Arts degree from the College of New Rochelle in New York. In 1967, she went to Lima, Peru, as a missionary for three years. Upon returning to the United States in 1969, she left the order and taught high school for several years in Louisiana, then lived in Spain for 16 months before returning again to the United States. She settled in Rochester, New York. Isasi-Díaz earned a master of arts in medieval history from SUNY Brockport. In 1983, she continued her graduate studies at Union Theological Seminary in New York City where she earned both a Master of Divinity degree and a Doctor of Philosophy degree with a concentration in Christian ethics in 1990. In 2006, she was awarded a Doctor of Divinity honoris causa from Colgate University.

== Career ==
Her studies and involvement in the feminist theological movement led her to begin to develop a theology from the perspective of Latinas in the United States, which led to the development of mujerista theology. This theology included their religious experiences, practices, and responses to the daily struggles of life. Early in her career Ada was very involved in the women's ordination movement within the Catholic Church. Because of this, Latina women living in the US who are keenly aware of how sexism, ethnic prejudice, and economic oppression subjugate them, use the term mujerista to refer to themselves and use mujerista theology to refer to the explanations of their faith and its role in their struggle for liberation. She was on the faculty of the theological and graduate schools of Drew University from 1991 to 2009. She was a panelist and occasional contributor to the "On Faith" online discussions at The Washington Post and Newsweek.

== Mujerista theology ==
The term Mujerista was coined by Isasi-Díaz. Mujerista is both a self-identification as well as being a conceptual framework, used in thinking and understanding people, ideas and movements. Latina women living in the US who are aware of how sexism, ethnic prejudice, and economic oppression limit their wholeness of life, use the term mujerista to refer to themselves as well as to mujerista theology, a type of liberation theology that categorizes their faith and its role in their struggle for liberation from distinct experiences of subjugation.

== Controversy ==
In 2007 she became an unofficial church pastor after the Archdiocese of New York closed Our Lady Queen of Angels Catholic Church in East Harlem, the parish church she attended while in seminary. A group of parishioners began holding protests and prayer meetings outside the building, but eventually it became a neighborhood institution where Isasi-Díaz delivered sermons. In March 2012, Isasi-Díaz's invitation as a keynote speaker at the Vanderhaar Symposium at Christian Brothers University was canceled due to her support for the ordination of women to the Catholic priesthood and because she ministered at her nephew's same-sex marriage ceremony at a Unitarian Church in Washington in 2009.

== Death ==
She died from cancer, after receiving her last rites in New York on May 13, 2012, at age 69. Her requiem Mass was held at St. Thomas the Apostle Catholic Church in Miami, Florida, on May 19, 2012. Later that day she was buried at Our Lady of Mercy Cemetery.

== Publications ==
- En la Lucha/In the Struggle: Elaborating a Mujerista Theology (Second edition, Fortress Press, 2003)
- La Lucha Continues: Mujerista Theology (Orbis Books, 2004)
- Mujerista Theology: A Theology for the 21st Century (Orbis Books, 1996)
- Sixth chapter of Transforming the Faiths of Our Fathers: Women Who Changed American Religion, edited by Ann Braude. (2004)

=== Co-edited/Co-authored books ===
- Ada María Isasi-Díaz and Fernando F. Segovia, ed. Hispanic/Latino Theology: Challenge and Promise (Fortress Press, 2006).
- A. Isasi-Díaz and Yolanda Tarango, Hispanic Women: Prophetic Voice in the Church (Harper & Row, 1988)

== See also ==
- Christian feminism
- Las Hermanas (organization)
- Womanist theology
- Modernism in the Catholic Church (Heresy)
