= Lucy Acosta =

Lucy Acosta may refer to:

- Lucy G. Acosta (1926–2008), Mexican-American activist
- Lucy Acosta, character in Shannon's Deal
