= Maestas vs. George H. Shone =

1914 U.S. lawsuit against educational segregation

Francisco Maestas et al. v. George H. Shone et al.
- Court: Alamosa Case No. 6
- Decided: April 17, 1914

Francisco Maestas et al. vs. George H. Shone et al. was a school desegregation case in Colorado involving Latino children in the early 20th Century. Filed in the Colorado district court, 12th district, in 1912 by Francisco Maestas against the Alamosa School District Superintendent and Board of Education in 1913, the case precedes Del Rio ISD v. Salvatierra by sixteen years, Alvarez v. Lemon Grove by seventeen years and Mendez v. Westminster by thirty-three years. The court ruled in favor of Maestas and the other Latino families.

Though quickly forgotten afterward, it is considered one of the earliest known court victories involving Latinos against educational segregation.

== Background ==
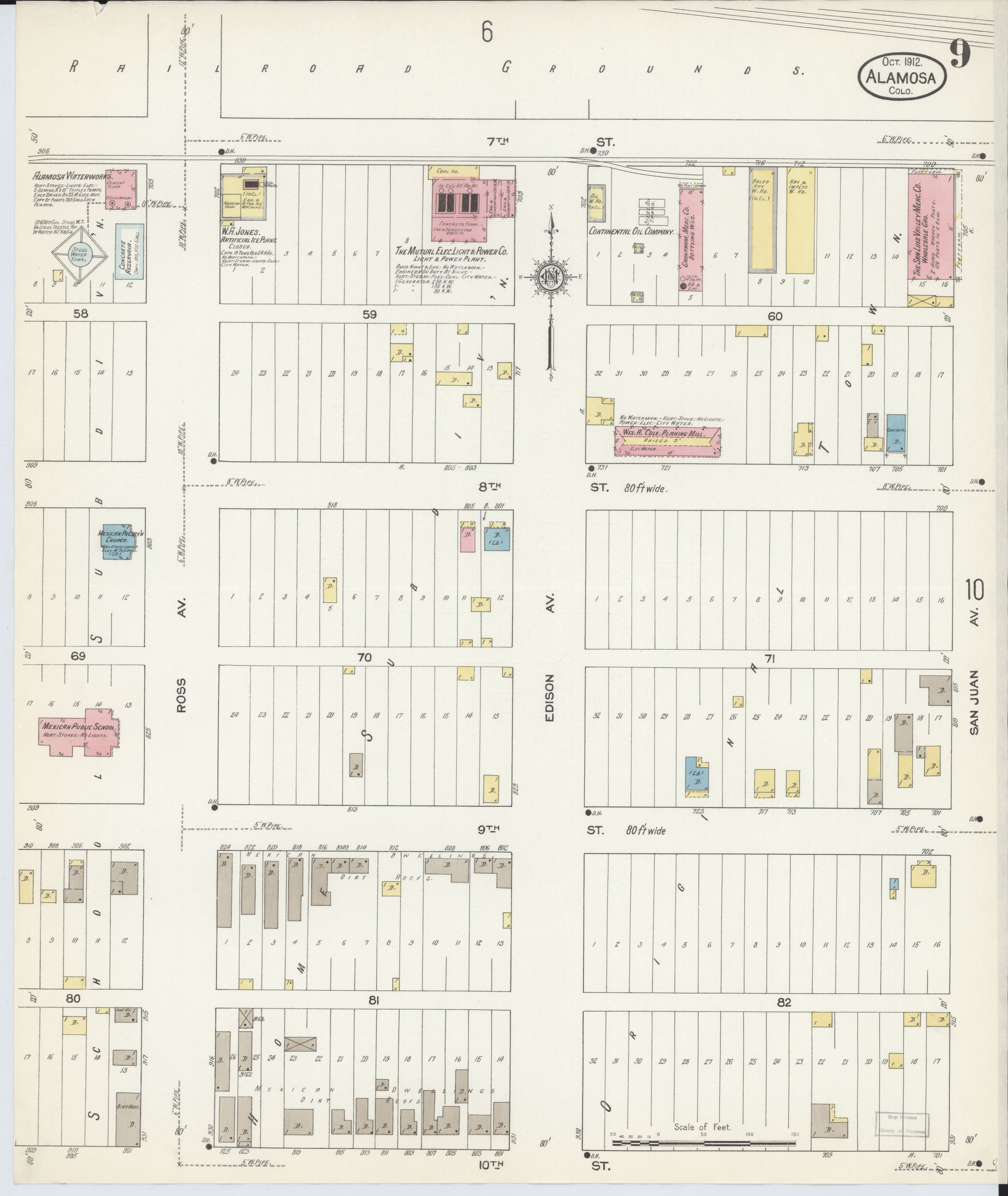
1912 map of Alamosa; the "Mexican Public School" is visible at left (west), on the corner of 9th and Ross. To the east of the school are "Mexican Dwellings" with dirt roofs. The Maestas children had to approach the school from the north, crossing the railway lines visible at the top (north) of the map.

Francisco Maestas, his wife Margaret, and their children Miguel and Josie, lived at 117 Ross Avenue in Alamosa, Colorado. Maestas worked as a foreman for the Denver & Rio Grande Railroad. This required the younger Maestas to cross active railroad tracks, to attend the "Mexican Preparatory School," located at Ninth Street and Ross Avenue, something his railroad worker father thought was dangerous. In September 1913, Maestas tried to enroll his son at the school closer to his home, the North Side School, located at Bell Avenue and Main Street. The request was refused and he was told that ten-year-old Miguel had to attend the "Mexican School."

In 1909, the Alamosa district built the Mexican Preparatory School (aka Mexican School) to serve the large number of Mexican American families that had moved to the Alamosa and the San Luis Valley because of work on the railroad. In 1912, the school district mandated that all Mexican American children attend the school to prepare them to join the high school as English speakers. Many of the families were "Hispanos," descended of families that had lived in the area from the time of the initial Spanish settlements. They were United States citizens and could speak English.

The school district divided the city's children as "Mexican" and "American", in spite of their language ability. Because of this, Maestas and other members of the Mexican-American community filed a discrimination lawsuit, aided by the Roman Catholic Archdiocese of Denver and the Sociedad Protectiva de Trabajadores Unidos (SPMDTU). To protest the disparate treatment, Mexican-American parents pulled their children out of school.

== District court decision ==
District Court judge Charles C. Holbrook presided over the case. In March 1914, a ruling of unlawful race prejudice was delivered. Holbrook ordered the school board and superintendent "to admit the children to the public school most convenient to their homes." Holbrook further ruled that "in the opinion of the court... the only way to destroy this feeling of discontent and bitterness which has recently grown up, is to allow all children so prepared, to attend the school nearest them."

== See also ==
- Del Rio ISD v. Salvatierra
- Clark v. Board of School Directors
- Lemon Grove Incident
- Mendez v. Westminster
