= Gregoria Ortega =

Mexican American activist and religious sister

Gregoria Ortega is a Mexican American activist and religious sister. She is best known for her support of students in an Abilene school walkout and her co-creation of the religious organization for Hispanic sisters and lay women in the Catholic Church, Las Hermanas. She continues to work as an activist today.

== Biography ==
Ortega was raised in El Paso, Texas and attended Bowie High School. When she was very young, her father impressed on her that being a sister was an important job, saying, "They are women who dedicate their entire lives to the Church and to God." She became a sister at 18 when she joined the Our Lady of Victory Missionary Sisters, also known as Victorynoll. She was newly professed in 1962. After taking vows, she served in San Angelo and Eagle Pass, Texas. On August 5, 1967, she took perpetual vows and then was assigned to Tulare, California. Ortega also spent time studying Spanish in Guanajuato City.

In 1969, she arrived in Abilene. She started teaching religious education in the highly segregated schools in the diocese of San Angelo. Ortega opposed the "severe physical abuse of Chicano/a students by their teachers. She encouraged her students to learn about peaceful civil rights protests which led to a nine-day walkout which Ortega supported. Around 300 students participated in the walkout.

Ortega also helped support the students throughout the lawsuit which the students and their families brought against the Abilene School Board. The Mexican American Legal Defense and Education Fund (MALDEF) was involved with the lawsuit which was filed in December of 1969. MALDEF counsel supported the students' rights to free speech and assembly.

Without support from her superiors, alone, "she faced down police officers, judges, school principals and school boards." Ortega's life was threatened for her involvement. Because of her involvement, she was expelled from the diocese.

In 1970, she helped form a Chicano group to deal with issues facing Mexican Americans in the public schools in Rotan.

Ortega met Gloria Gallardo through a friend, Father Edmundo Rodriguez, and the two of them worked together to form Las Hermanas in 1971. When Gallardo showed interest in creating a group for Spanish-speaking sisters and invited Ortega to live with her, Ortega obtained travel funds from Victoryknoll's mother superior and bought a one-way ticket to Houston. Gallardo and Ortega formed Las Hermanas by finding and inviting Mexican-American women to meet in Houston in April 1971. The group eventually grew to have around 900 sisters who were members, and met annually.

In 1973, Ortega and other members of Las Hermanas protested for farmworker's rights in Fresno. Later, Ortega and Sister Carmelita Espinoza were involved in the creation of El Centro Guadalupano, which served Mexican parishioners and was created between 1985 and 1986 in Spokane.
