= José de la Luz Sáenz =

Mexican American diarist, educator, and activist (1888–1953)

- Born: May 17, 1888
- Died: April 12, 1953 (aged 64)
- Burial place: Fort Sam Houston National Cemetery
- Military career
- Known for: Authored the only diary from a Mexican American soldier in World War I

José de la Luz Sáenz (May 17, 1888 – April 12, 1953) was a Mexican American educator, writer, and civil rights activist best known for his military service in World War I and his leadership in the Mexican American Civil Rights Movement in the United States. His wartime diary provides the only firsthand account of a Mexican American soldier's experience in World War I and highlights the ongoing discrimination Latino servicemen faced at home. Sáenz was a founding member of the League of United Latin American Citizens (LULAC), the largest and oldest Hispanic and Latin-American and civil rights organization in the United States.

== Early life and education ==
Sáenz was born in Realitos, Texas, in Duval County, on May 17, 1888, to Rosalío Sáenz and Cristina Hernández, immigrants from Mier, Tamaulipas, Mexico. After his mother's early death in 1896, Sáenz was raised by his father, who worked as a laborer and ranch hand.

Despite these challenges, Sáenz pursued an education and graduated from high school in Alice, Texas in 1908 and received a teaching certificate soon after. He began teaching in segregated "Mexican schools" in South Texas, where his students were routinely provided fewer resources, underqualified teachers, and inferior facilities compared to white students. These inequities made a deep impression on Sáenz, solidifying his belief in the power of education as a tool for upward mobility and community empowerment.

In addition to being bilingual in Spanish and English, Sáenz taught himself French. Sáenz was a prolific reader and kept detailed journals throughout his life, a habit that provided the basis for his most well-known literary work.

== Military service in World War I ==
In February 1918, Sáenz volunteered for military service during World War I. He enlisted as a private in the Intelligence Section of the 360th Infantry Regiment, part of the 90th Division of the American Expeditionary Forces (AEF). His linguistic abilities soon led to his assignment as an interpreter and intelligence clerk in France. He performed duties ranging from translating military documents to interrogating German prisoners of war and liaising with French officers and civilians.

While overseas, Sáenz kept a detailed war diary written in Spanish. His entries convey a mix of idealism, patriotism, and profound disillusionment. Despite his commitment to American democratic ideals, Sáenz recorded the discrimination he and fellow Mexican American soldiers endured—from unequal treatment in the ranks to being overlooked for promotion and recognition. In one diary entry dated August 1918, he noted that he would now use the typewriter—his “weapon”—to fight for justice and truth.

His unit participated in the Battle of Saint-Mihiel and the Meuse-Argonne Offensive, the latter being the largest battle in United States military history and the deadliest campaign in the history of the United States Army. Sáenz returned to Texas after the armistice.

== World War I diary and postwar publication ==
In 1933, fourteen years after Sáenz's last diary entry, he published "Los México-Americanos y La Gran Guerra y Su Contingent en Pro de la Democracia, la Humanidad y la Justicia: Mi Diario Particular" (“The Mexican Americans in the Great War and Their Contribution to Democracy, Humanity, and Justice”), which was reissued in 2014 under the title The World War I Diary of José de la Luz Sáenz, translated and edited by Emilio Zamora. The diary covers a period of 16 months, from his enlistment in the Army in February 1918 through his discharge in June 1919. It is the only diary authored by a Mexican-American member of the U.S. Military from World War I.

The diary stands as a vital document, providing historians with insight into the dual struggle of Mexican Americans fighting for democracy abroad while being denied full citizenship rights at home.

== Civil rights activism and founding of LULAC ==
Following the war, Sáenz resumed teaching in South Texas and became deeply involved in civil rights organizing. He joined the Order of the Sons of America, a San Antonio-based group of middle-class Mexican Americans who sought to combat discrimination through assimilationist strategies.

In 1929, Sáenz was instrumental in founding the League of United Latin American Citizens (LULAC). The organization emerged from the merger of several groups in Corpus Christi, including the Sons of America and the Knights of America. Sáenz helped write LULAC's constitution and bylaws, emphasizing civic engagement, education, and the protection of constitutional rights for all U.S. citizens of Latin American descent.

Through LULAC, Sáenz worked to dismantle barriers to voting, fought against segregated schooling, and promoted citizenship classes for immigrants. He frequently wrote columns and letters to editors advocating for equal treatment, condemning lynching and labor exploitation, and supporting Mexican American candidates for public office.

== Educational philosophy ==
Sáenz's educational philosophy was rooted in the belief that knowledge and cultural pride were key to empowerment. While some contemporaries favored full assimilation into Anglo-American culture, Sáenz insisted on maintaining Mexican cultural traditions, language, and identity. He opposed the English-only mandates imposed in Texas schools and encouraged students to be bilingual and bicultural.

He also organized community literacy programs and pushed for desegregation years before it became a national issue. His activism extended to adult education and economic uplift, recognizing the intersectional challenges faced by Mexican American families.

== In literature ==
Soldier for Equality: José de la Luz Sáenz and the Mexican American Fight for Civil Rights is a children's nonfiction picture book written and illustrated by Duncan Tonatiuh, published in 2019 by Abrams Books for Young Readers. The book tells the story of José de la Luz Sáenz (commonly known as Luz), a Mexican American teacher, World War I veteran, and early civil rights activist. Aimed at elementary and middle-grade readers, the book introduces young audiences to Luz's life and his contributions to the struggle for Mexican-American equality in the United States.

The narrative follows Sáenz from his upbringing in Texas, where he experienced firsthand the discrimination faced by Mexican Americans, through his career as a schoolteacher and his service in World War I. During the war, Luz served as an intelligence officer and interpreter, using his knowledge of multiple languages to support the U.S. military in Europe. Despite his honorable service, Luz returned to the United States only to encounter continued prejudice and segregation. Motivated by these injustices, he became one of the founding members of the League of United Latin American Citizens (LULAC) in 1929, one of the first major Latino civil rights organizations in the U.S.

Tonatiuh's book emphasizes Luz's patriotism and resilience, highlighting the contradiction between his loyalty to his country and the discrimination he faced from it. The book also introduces readers to broader themes of activism, community organization, and social justice. Tonatiuh draws heavily from Sáenz's own wartime diary, which was published in Spanish in 1933 under the title La Crónica de un Soldado. This primary source lends authenticity and personal insight to the narrative.

Soldier for Equality received numerous accolades and honors. It was named a Pura Belpré Honor Book for illustration and was also included in the American Library Association’s Notable Children's Books list. Critics have commended the book for filling a gap in children's literature by highlighting the contributions of Latino Americans to U.S. history and the ongoing fight for civil rights.

== Legacy and honors ==
José de la Luz Sáenz died April 12, 1953 and is buried at the National Cemetery at Fort Sam Houston in San Antonio, Texas. His contributions lived on through the continued growth of LULAC and the growing awareness of Latino civil rights in American history. His diary has been recognized as a foundational text in Chicano literature and Mexican American history. Scholars now consider his writings a precursor to the Chicano Movement of the 1960s and 1970s.

In recent years, Sáenz’s life has been commemorated through public memorials, books, and school dedications. In 2014, the English-language edition of his diary made his story more accessible to a broader audience, bringing renewed attention to his pioneering role in the fight for equality.
