= Gloria Gallardo =

Chicana activist (1938–2012)

- Born: October 16, 1938; San Antonio, Texas
- Died: February 14, 2012 (aged 73)
- Organization: Las Hermanas
- Children: Ervey Longoria

Gloria Graciela Gallardo (October 16, 1938 - February 14, 2012) was a Chicana activist and former religious sister. She is best known for her involvement in the 1970 student boycotts in Houston, coordinating the huelga schools and for co-founding Las Hermanas.

== Biography ==
Gallardo was born in San Antonio. She became a member of the Sisters of the Holy Ghost. After taking vows, Gallardo began to work what was considered a "rough" part of town, Alazán-Apache Courts in San Antonio. She worked for several years in barrios in San Antonio.

In 1969, she was asked to come to Houston to work as the interim director of the Mexican American Education Council (MAEC). In this capacity, she helped support student boycotts against unfair policies, protested and spoke publicly for MAEC. Gallardo was a leader in the Mexican American boycott of the Houston public schools in the early 1970s. In September 1970, she set up special schools, called strike or huelga schools, for students to get an education while they were boycotting the school district.

Gallardo met Sister Gregoria Ortega through a friend, Father Edmundo Rodriguez in 1970. Together, they worked to identify Hispanic nuns in the United States and invited them to join a group. While they were working on the project, Ortega, who had recently been fired from her diocese had no income, and Gallardo shared her salary from her work with the Galveston-Houston diocese. Gallardo and Ortega then worked together to invite Mexican American nuns to create an organization for Spanish speaking religious women in April 1971. The group was formed and called Las Hermanas. Gallardo was elected to be the first president of Las Hermanas at this first meeting. Gallardo also edited their newsletter, Informes, which was first sent out on September 19, 1971.

In 1972, Gallardo resigned from the leadership team of Las Hermanas. She didn't like the change in direction the organization was taking.

Eventually Gallardo left religious life and was married. She had a son, Ervey Longoria, in 1977. Gallardo died in 2012.
