= Huelga schools (Houston) =

Alternative Mexican-American schools in Houston, Texas, U.S. (1970-72)

Huelga, "strike" or "freedom" schools were alternative schools set up in Houston in order to continue the education of boycotting Mexican-American students between 1970 and 1972. The schools were coordinated by Sister Gloria Gallardo and Tina Reyes. Curriculum for the schools was developed by committee with professor Edward Gonzáles acting as the head. Students learned basic skills such as reading and writing as well as history and culture.

== Background ==
The Houston Independent School District (HISD) in the late 1960s and early 1970s refused to consider Chicano students as a minority for the purposes of desegregating schools. The Mexican American Legal Defense and Educational Fund (MALDEF) opened a case against HISD, alleging that the district was illegally segregating black and Chicano students from white students. In addition, a group called the Mexican American Education Council (MAEC) was formed to coordinate efforts to protest school segregation. Some people were critical of the actions taken by huelga schools and felt that the issue was motivated by racism against African Americans.

When school started in 1970, around 3,500 Chicano students boycotted schools run by HISD and instead attended huelga schools. Some of the students protested outside of their schools.

== About ==
Huelga schools were staffed by teachers who volunteered their time. The schools served all ages of students and were located in churches and community centers. Members of the Mexican American Youth Organization (MAYO) also volunteered to teach history and culture. Sister Gloria Gallardo coordinated the schools. Tina Reyes ensured that the schools had enough resources to function. Curriculum was planned by a committee headed by Edward Gonzáles, a professor at the University of Houston.

In September 1970, there were around 14 huelga schools available to Chicano students. Around 2,000 students were registered to attend the schools. The number of schools rose to sixteen by September 10. The huelga schools were disbanded in October 1970 when HISD agreed to a busing plan to integrate the schools. This lasted until early in 1971.

The huelga schools opened again early in 1971 when segregation once again became an issue. The schools were poorly funded until April 1971 when the Department of Health, Education and Welfare provided a $65,000 grant to fund them through the summer. Attendance waned at the huelga schools between 1971 and 1972.

The boycott continued on and off until the end of the 1972 school year.
