= Las Hermanas (organization) =

Feminist Catholic organization for Spanish speaking women

- Formation: April 1971
- Founder: Gloria Gallardo and Gregoria Ortega
- Founded at: Houston, Texas
- Type: non-governmental organization
- Official language: Spanish

Las Hermanas is a feminist, autonomous Roman Catholic organization created between 1970 and 1971 for Hispanic women who are involved in the Catholic Church. It was incorporated in Texas in 1972 and was the first group in the Church in the United States to represent Spanish-speaking women. Las Hermanas has worked for the improvement of the lives of religious Hispanic women and their communities. They are outspoken critics of sexism in the Church and their communities. Las Hermanas is very political and has taken part in protests and other civil rights actions. The organization is currently considered to be on "hiatus," with plans to continue their work in the future.

== About ==
While Spanish speaking nuns made up a significant minority of nuns in the United States, they were the last group of women to form a coalition in the Church. Las Hermanas was formed to "develop cultural pride among their people." In this way, they could be agents of political change by advocating for other Hispanic Americans. One of the founders, Gloria Gallardo, said that Spanish-speaking nuns needed to advocate on behalf of their communities because only they best understood their needs. In addition, the organization fought against sexism in the church. They promoted the idea that sexism was an "aberration" and a sin. The group also lobbied for women's ordination. Other early goals for Las Hermanas was to help improve the lives of nuns who worked for men as cooks and maids in rectories and seminaries in the United States. Many Mexican nuns were sent to the United States because they were seen as "cheap labor" for the Church. Las Hermanas also advocated on issues like childcare, violence against women, education and poverty. The organization has also marched for farmworkers' rights.

Members of Las Hermanas originally included only nuns, but later admitted lay women of many different Spanish speaking backgrounds. Las Hermanas has partnered with other organizations to reach their goals, such as Padres Asociados para Derechos Religiosos, Educativos y Sociales (PADRES). The group has had an influential effect on the National Conference of Catholic Bishops/United States Catholic Conference (NCCB/USCC), the LCWR and the Secretariat for Hispanic Affairs of the United States Catholic Conference. Las Hermanas worked with women's groups to help support the organization; many religious women helped support Las Hermanas through donations.

Las Hermanas published a quarterly newsletter called Informes. Las Hermanas is recognized as an "official" Catholic organization, but is autonomous of the Church.

== History ==
Sisters Gloria Gallardo and Gregoria Ortega were the founding members in 1970 in Houston. Gallardo and Ortega were brought together by a friend of Ortega's, Father Edmundo Rodriguez. The two nuns started the group by soliciting Mexican-American women's names from bishops around the United States and also from the Leadership Conference of Women Religious (LCWR). From this list, they invited women to come to Houston in April 1971. The invitation, sent out in October, called on women to come together "not just for strength and support, but to educate ourselves as to who we are, where we're going, and how." At the time, Gallardo worked in the office of community relations for the Galveston-Houston diocese.

Around fifty Mexican-American women came to the first meeting, all of them had joined Catholic religious life just after Vatican II or prior to the conference. Many of them shared the experience of having to deny their cultural heritage after taking vows. The nuns represented eight different states: Arizona, Colorado, California, Illinois, Iowa, New Mexico, Missouri and Texas, with one delegate from Monterrey, Mexico. At this meeting, which lasted over three days, they decided on the name of the organization and the motto. "Las Hermanas" means "the sisters" in Spanish. The motto chosen for the organization was "unidas en acción y oración” (united in action and prayer). The choice to put "action" before "prayer" was a deliberate choice by the nuns. The sisters elected Gallardo to serve as the first president.

Nuns at the April 1971 meeting chose to pursue as their immediate goals to "affect social change and to teach congregations, largely led by Anglos, about the needs of Spanish-speaking communities." Nuns who were European-American in this group either did not return for the next meeting or became associate members; the group was meant to focus on developing leadership and opportunities for Hispanic women. Within six months, the group had grown to around 900 nuns. On September 19, 1971, the first issue of their newsletter, Informes, which was edited by Gallardo, was sent out.

The next meeting was planned for November 1971 in Santa Fe, where 900 nuns of Hispanic heritage attended. Women from Puerto Rico and Cuba attended this conference. The November Santa Fe meeting resulted in an agreement to create teams which would target Spanish-speaking Catholics and help raise the awareness of community issues facing Hispanics. They also decided on a constitution for the group. The charter for the organization was granted by the state of Texas on February 22, 1972. Also in 1972, Gallardo resigned from the leadership team.

Las Hermanas moved their headquarters from Houston to San Antonio and adopted a form of team leadership. The three women who began leading the organization were Sisters Maria de Jesus Ybarra, Mario Barron and Carmelita Espinoza. Also in 1973, the national meeting was split with half the sisters who were going to attend going instead to Fresno to protest the treatment of farmworkers. By 1975, lay women could join the organization.

At the seventh conference in 1977, Las Hermanas decided they would develop a strategy to promote women's concerns at the Second National Encuentro of Hispanic Catholics which was happening later that year. In 1978, sisters from Las Hermanas were "prominent" speakers at the 1978 national conference on women's ordination.

In 1985, the group testified on the National Conference of Catholic Bishops' Pastoral Letter on Women. During the testimony, Sisters Beatriz Diaz-Taveras, Maria Teresa Garza, Ada María Isasi-Díaz and Carmen Villegas testified about Hispanic women's oppression in the Church, in their families and in broader society.

That same year, at the Tercer Encuentro, the group held a protest outside of the final session of the conference. The final document was supposed to include a line about women's ordination. When conference planners did not allow the vote to go through, Las Hermanas, including Isasi-Diaz and Tarango, protested outside by praying the rosary and refusing to go in. Eventually, conference organizers agreed to come back to the drawing board. Although the document did not support women's ordination, the language changed to be more inclusive of women at all levels of church ministry.

In the early 1990s the group relocated to the campus of Our Lady of the Lake University.

By 1991, there were around 1,000 members of Las Hermanas. Around this time, however, due to leadership being over-extended, the group began to decline.

== Legacy ==
Las Hermanas has helped spread Latina theology not just in the Catholic Church, but through other Christian churches in the United States. The way in which Las Hermanas approached spirituality, theology, politics and feminism led to the creation of mujerista theology. Early members of Las Hermanas, Yolanda Tarango and Ada María Isasi-Díaz, first wrote about mujerista theology in their book, Hispanic Women: Prophetic Voice in the Church (1988).

A book about Las Hermanas, Las Hermanas: Chicana/Latina Religious-Political Activism in the U.S. Catholic Church (2004) was written by Lara Medina. Medina used interviews with women involved with the group to describe the history of the organization.

Papers and archives for Las Hermanas are held at Our Lady of the Lake University's Sueltenfuss Library.

The Mexican American Catholic College (MACC) was created in 1972 through a partnership with Las Hermanas, PADRES, the Texas Catholic Conference and the Archdiocese of San Antonio. Father Juan Romero stated that MACC "considered Las Hermanas and PADRES as co-founders" of the school.

== See also ==
- Associations of the faithful
- Catholic laity
