= Mexican-American Education Council =

Non-profit organization in Houston, Texas

The Mexican-American Educational Council (MAEC) was a post Chicano-movement non-profit organization in the Houston, Texas area. Its principal goal was to achieve equitable access to public education for Mexican Americans in Texas.

== History ==
In late 1970, MAEC organized boycotts and walkouts of schools within the Houston Independent School District (HISD) in protest against the district's racist integration orders. In protest, MAEC established "huelga" schools where Mexican American children could attend school while the concerns were resolved. More than 3,500 students participated in the protests.

MAEC was formed in the summer of 1970. MAEC was headed by Leonel Castillo and an activist nun, Sister Gloria Gallardo, served as interim director for a while.

On August 25, 1970, Castillo spoke at a hastily planned press conference, explaining the position of MAEC. On August 31, 1970 MAEC began aggressive boycotts, protests, and picketing. These actions lasted approximately three weeks, during which around 60% of the student bodies of some high schools participated in the boycotts.

To advance their cause, they petitioned and received $65,000 in funding from the Department of Health, Education, and Welfare in 1970.

During the protests MAEC demanded twenty issues to be resolved and HISD began rezoning school areas within its jurisdiction in response. However, this rezoning encouraged "white flight" since minorities were now entering "white schools" in large numbers. At first the district used forced busing, but later switched to a voluntary magnet school program in order to discourage "white flight". The district eventually integrated races in a semi-peaceful manner.

== See also ==
- Chicano
- Chicanismo
- Chicano nationalism
- Chicana/o studies
- League of United Latin American Citizens (LULAC)
- Mexican American Legal Defense and Educational Fund (MALDEF)
