= Belen Robles =

American advocate for women (born 1936)

- Born: 1936 (age 88–89); El Paso, Texas, United States
- Education: Bowie High School (El Paso, Texas)
- Occupation: advocate for women
- Known for: first national woman president of League of United Latin American Citizens (LULAC)
- Parents: Joaquin Borrego (father); Dolores Ortega Borrego (mother)

Belen Borrego Robles (born 1936) is a former national president of the League of United Latin American Citizens (LULAC) and served as the group's first national woman president. She has many years experience working for the United States Government in positions relating to immigration and customs.

== Biography ==
Belen Borrego Robles was born in 1936 in El Paso, Texas, where she also grew up. She was the fifth of 10 children born to Dolores Ortega Borrego and Joaquin Borrego. She is a graduate of Bowie High School, class of 1954. Robles married Ramiro Robles at age seventeen.

When Robles was job searching in 1956, she was told that "Mexicans are only hired as elevator girls and cooks." She went on to work at the Immigration and Naturalization Service (INS) starting in 1957. In 1971, she went to work for the United States Customs Service.

Robles joined the League of United Latin American Citizens (LULAC) in 1957. Robles became deputy district director of the El Paso area LULAC council in 1964. Previously, she had been president of the Ladies LULAC Council 9. In 1994, she ran for national president of LULAC at the national convention held in El Paso. Robles went on to become the first woman to serve as national president of the organization.

In 2001, she ran for mayor of El Paso. Belen has served on the board of trustees for the El Paso Community College and the Texas Association of Community College Trustees.
