= Merici Academy =

Merici Academy was an all-girls school in Havana, Cuba, run by North American Ursuline nuns. The school was in existence from 1941 to 1961, when it was closed as a result of the Cuban Revolution.

== History ==
Merici Academy was founded when American Ursuline nuns in Havana saw a need for an English-language girls’ school. The school opened in 1941, with Mother Thomas Voorhies of the New Orleans Ursuline community as its principal. Merici Academy opened with 100 students, although by 1950 it had grown to 300 students. The school was located in the Biltmore neighborhood of Havana.

Merici Academy was an elementary and secondary school. Teaching at the academy was conducted in English, with the exception of classes in Language, History and Geography of Cuba, and Civics, which were required by law to be conducted in Spanish. Merici Academy was accredited by the U.S. Southern Association of Colleges and Secondary Schools.

When the United States broke diplomatic relations with Cuba in January 1961, the American nuns returned to the United States. Merici Academy remained open until May 1961, when it was confiscated by the Cuban government. Many Merici Academy students were sent to New Orleans and other cities in the United States to finish their education.

In 1966, the Merici Academy Alumnae Association, sometimes also referred to as Merici Academy Alumnae in Exile, was founded in Miami, FL.
