= Lucy G. Acosta =

Mexican-American activist (1926-2008)

Chair, El Paso County Housing Authority

El Paso Civil Service Commission

Texas Advisory Committee to the White House Conference on Families

El Paso Community College Board of Trustees

Personal details
- Born: Maria Angela Socorro Grijalva; October 4, 1926 Miami, Arizona, U.S.
- Died: March 8, 2008 (aged 81) El Paso, Texas, U.S.
- Resting place: Restlawn Park Cemetery
- Spouse: Alejandro Acosta
- Relations: David Peña, stepfather
- Children: Alejandro, Jr, Daniel
- Parent(s): Maria Socorro Grijalva and Apolonio Grijalva
- Education: International Business School
- Profession: Bookkeeper, accountant
- Known for: LULAC organizer; co-founder Project Amistad
- Awards: Outstanding LULAC Woman (national), El Paso Conquistador, Yellow Rose of Texas, United Way Annual Volunteer Service Award

Lucy G. Acosta (née Maria Angela Socorro Grijalva; October 4, 1926 – March 8, 2008) was a Mexican-American activist with the League of United Latin American Citizens (LULAC). She was a political appointee under various mayors of El Paso, Texas. She was elected to the Texas Women's Hall of Fame in 1987. The Lucy G. Acosta Humanitarian Awards were named in her honor, and have been presented every year since 1993.

== Early years ==
Lucy Acosta was born as Maria Angela Socorro Grijalva on October 4, 1926, in Miami, Arizona. Her father, Apolonio Grijalva, died while working in a copper mine three years after her birth. Her mother, Maria Socorro, received a pension from the mining company and moved to El Paso, then married David Peña, a local bricklayer. Lucy attended local public schools, while participating in athletics and joining the Bowie High School student council before graduating in the top ten of her class in 1943. She graduated from the International Business School in 1945.

== Career ==
Acosta started her LULAC membership in 1957 and reconstituted a Ladies’ Council for the organization, #335. The council delivered food to senior women and sponsored scholarships for local students. Through the council, she raised funds for paying voter poll taxes and registered Hispanics to vote. She campaigned for Raymond Telles in his successful bid to become the first Mexican-American mayor of El Paso. Telles and subsequent mayors appointed Acosta to various posts within their administrations.

In 1972, Acosta was appointed to the 17th District Bar Association of Law Examiners, becoming the first woman and layperson in the history of the State Bar of Texas to receive that appointment. She was also the first woman to be elected to the El Paso Community College Board of Trustees; and the first woman in the history of El Paso to be appointed civil service commissioner. In 1963 and 1973 she was selected Outstanding LULAC National Woman of the Year. Acosta was the first female member of the El Paso Civil Service Commission.

Acosta co-founded Project Amistad in 1976, a flagship social service program that assisted the elderly and disabled in the El Paso community. She also served as its executive director for two and a half decades. Governor Bill Clements tapped Acosta for the Texas Advisory Committee to the White House Conference on Families in 1980. In 1982, United Way honored her with the first Annual Volunteer Service Award. Her other service included organizations focused on aging, child welfare, education, and food security. She was also the recipient of the El Paso Conquistador and Yellow Rose of Texas awards. El Paso County voters elected Acosta as chair of the county’s housing authority in 1993.

== Personal life ==
In 1948, Lucy married Alejandro Acosta, a World War II veteran and a fellow alumnus from Bowie High School. He also served in the Korean War. She bore two sons, Alejandro, Jr. and Daniel.

== Death and legacy ==
Acosta died on March 8, 2008, in El Paso, Texas and she is interred at Restlawn Park Cemetery. She is a member of the LULAC Hall of Fame, the Texas Women’s Hall of Fame, and the El Paso Commission for Women Hall of Fame. Lucy Acosta Way, a street in El Paso, is named in her honor. Every year, Project Amistad presents the Lucy G. Acosta Humanitarian Awards, last presented on April 27, 2018, and named for Acosta since 1993.
