= Del Rio ISD v. Salvatierra =

1930 Texan Supreme Court ruling

- Decided: 1930

Del Rio ISD v. Salvatierra is a Texas Supreme Court ruling filed in 1930. The ruling sought to determine whether separate education for Spanish speakers in white school districts was permissible. The decision permitted language-based tracking in the lower grades based on educational needs, as long as it was within the white school district. It was later overturned by Delgado v. Bastrop ISD.

== See also ==
- Lemon Grove Incident
- Clark v. Board of School Directors
- Mendez v. Westminster
- Maestas vs. George H. Shone
- Delgado v. Bastrop ISD
