= Order of the Sons of America =

The Order of the Sons of America (El Orden Hijos de America or OSA) was a civic organization formed by Mexican-American citizens in San Antonio, Texas on October 13, 1921. The OSA expanded to chapters in various cities throughout Texas including Somerset, Pearsall and Corpus Christi. As one of the three largest organizations of its type in the 1920s, its goal was to protect and advance the interests of Mexican-American citizens and their community, seeking to counter discrimination against them. Limiting their members to native-born US or naturalized citizens, the group was led by Spanish-speaking Mexicans of the upper class, including attorneys, teachers, and entrepreneurs.

== Historical context ==
During the first quarter of the 20th century, hundreds of thousands of Mexican immigrants were recruited to work in the United States. Mexican-American citizens, some of whom had families whose roots in the Southwest preceded its annexation by the United States, began to realize they were being lumped together with the immigrants because of physical, language and other ethnic similarities although they were United States citizens and had a long history of settlement. Mexican-American citizens who were native-born and veterans of World War I particularly resented being subject to the same discrimination as new Mexican immigrants. Mexican Americans believed they were being associated with immigrants who were typically poor and took the lowest-paying jobs. Because of the harsh anti-Mexican feelings in parts of the US, Mexican-American citizens resisted being associated with immigrants from Mexico. As the Mexican immigrant population in the American Southwest continued to grow, Mexican Americans began to lobby for immigration restrictions.

== Ideology ==
The Order of the Sons of America believed that assimilation to majority American culture would enable them to become equal members of American society in all respects. The OSA only allowed membership to native born and naturalized citizens of the United States, believing that their interests were different from those of Mexican immigrants. Excluding Mexican immigrants from membership and taking a stance against large scale immigration were bold and controversial political strategies.

The OSA wanted to persuade Anglo Americans that Mexican Americans were as loyal and admirable as other Americans. OSA members concluded that having maintained Mexican culture and ethnicity had hindered their ability to be accepted as equal American citizens. As such, they held their meetings in English and used the American flag liberally in their iconography. They also adopted “America” as an official hymn of the organization, and the saying “For Our Country” as the motto.

By living American lifestyles, members of the OSA sought to achieve social justice. The organization's purpose was to use its "influence in all fields of social, economic, and political action in order to realize the greatest enjoyment possible of all the rights and privileges and prerogatives extended by the American Constitution."

== Founding and organization ==
The Order of the Sons of America was organized under a constitution. Among the creators were John C. Solis, a twenty-year-old wholesaler; Francisco (Frank) Leyton, a thirty-year-old saddle maker; his brother Melchor Leyton, a baker; and Santiago G. Tafolla Sr., a district criminal court clerk. On November 4, 1921 over 150 people came together at Fest Hall for the first OSA meeting. They elected Santiago G. Tafolla as president of the OSA and Feliciano G. Flores, a deputy sheriff, as vice president. They chose The Order of the Sons of America as their official name.

The OSA received a state charter on January 4, 1922; in 1925 it opened the OSA headquarters in downtown San Antonio. By 1923 the original San Antonio chapter had around 250 members, including Manuel C. Gonzales. By 1928 the Corpus Christi Chapter had around 175 members who included Louis Wilmot, Bernardo F. Garza, and Andrés de Luna.

== Constitution ==
In 1922 members drafted a 45-page, English-language constitution for the organization. Clemente Idar, James Tafolla Sr., and Ramon Carvajal Jr. worked on this, which they translated into Spanish in 1927. It included a preamble, order of business, declaration of principles, officers’ stations, obligations, bylaws, rules of order, and a committee report. The constitution said that members were “to use their influence in all fields of social, economic, and political action in order to realize the greatest enjoyment possible of all the rights and privileges and prerogatives extended by the American constitution.” Members were required to be over the age of sixteen and United States citizens of Spanish or Mexican origin. While none was ever organized, the OSA constitution allowed for juvenile sub-organizations and ladies auxiliaries.

== Chapters ==
Known chapters created by the original San Antonio Council were in Texas cities including: Somerset and Pearsall by the year 1923 and Corpus Christi by 1924. In 1927, the Corpus Christi chapter created a council in Kingsville. Other known councils existed in Alice and Beeville.

== Historical contributions ==
The OSA fought to increase Mexican-American representation in the political sphere and decrease social and economic ethnic segregation. They supported lectures on constitutional rights, developing responsible citizenship and more, all of which were open to the public. Both the San Antonio and Corpus Christi chapters participated actively in civic affairs and civil rights movements.

- In 1925, the Corpus Christi chapter successfully lobbied for and helped fund the Cheston L. Heath School for Mexican-American students;
- In 1926, the OSA helped to desegregate the Palace Bath House;
- In 1927, they helped the first Mexican American to be selected as a juror;
- Also in 1927, the OSA took action to gain removal of a sign reading, “No Mexicans Allowed,” from North Beach;
- In 1932, Juan Morales and Victor Fuentes were charged with murdering a European-American man. The OSA paid for the defense attorney and other financial burdens of the case.

== Merger and end ==
In 1929, the Order of the Sons of America merged with El Orden Caballeros de America (the Order of the Knights of America) and the League of Latino American Citizens to form the League of United Latin American Citizens (LULAC) in Corpus Christi.
