= Alonso S. Perales =

American lawyer and civil rights activist

2nd President of the LULAC
- In office 1930–1931
- Preceded by: Ben Garza
- Succeeded by: Manuel C. Gonzales

Personal details
- Born: October 17, 1898 Alice, Texas
- Died: May 9, 1960 (aged 61)
- Education: George Washington University Law School
- Occupation: Attorney, diplomat

Alonso S. Perales (October 17, 1898 – May 9, 1960) was an American lawyer, diplomat, and civil rights activist based in Texas. He was the intellectual architect of the League of United Latin American Citizens (LULAC) though he served as the second president, helping write its constitution. Perales also served as a US diplomat in thirteen missions in Latin America in the 1920s.

== Early life ==
Perales was born on October 17, 1898, in Alice, Texas to Susana (née Sandoval) and Nicolás Perales. At age 6 his father died and at 12 he was orphaned. He worked as a child picking cotton, peddled tamales and pan dulce, and worked for the railroad. He married Marta Engracia Pérez of Rio Grande City, daughter of prominent businessman Casimiro Perez Alvarez. Together, they adopted a daughter and two sons in the 1950s.

Raised by Crecensio Treviño and Eugenia Naranjo, he attended school in Alice and later graduated from Draughon's Business College in San Antonio in 1915.

When World War I broke out, Perales was drafted into the United States Army and worked as a Field Army Clerk. After serving, he received an honorable discharge in 1920. He passed the civil service examination and moved to Washington D.C. where he worked for the Department of Commerce for about a year and a half.

While in Washington D.C., he continued his studies, receiving a Master of Arts degree from the National University's School of Economics and Government. He received his law degree from what would become the George Washington University Law School in 1925. He moved to Texas shortly afterward as one of the first Mexican Americans to practice law in the United States.

== Career ==
=== Diplomacy ===
In the 1920s through the 1930s, Perales served as a diplomat, traveling to the Dominican Republic, Cuba, Nicaragua, Mexico, Chile, and the West Indies on various diplomatic missions. Later, in 1945, he served as legal counsel to the Nicaraguan delegation at the United Nations Conference on International Organization (UNCIO), also known as the San Francisco Conference. This conference took place from 25 April 1945 to 26 June 1945 in San Francisco, California. During this meeting, delegates reviewed the 1944 Dumbarton Oaks agreements and created the Charter of the United Nations.

=== Civil rights ===
Perales was active in civil rights advocacy and according to scholars, is one of the most influential Hispanic Americans of his time. He moved back to Texas and dedicated his life to combatting discrimination against people of Mexican descent through law, advocacy, and his writings, including two volumes of En Defensa de mi raza (In Defense of My People), first published in 1937. These volumes included essays, letters, speeches, and work by other intellectuals on the problem of discrimination in Texas. His book, Are We Good Neighbors?, published in 1948 by Artes Gráficas, examined the discrimination, exploitation, and injustices faced by people of Mexican and Latin American descent throughout the United States. Are We Good Neighbors? also includes affidavits from the public that detail these incidents of discrimination.

In San Antonio, Texas, Perales collaborated with Maury Maverick. And in the 1940s, he petitioned to introduce a bill in the Texas legislature that would prohibit discrimination based on race.

=== League of United Latin American Citizens (LULAC) ===
During the 1930s, Mexican Americans, as well as other communities of Latin American descent, began organizing in response to Juan Crow (Jim Crow) laws in Texas. This resulted in the formation of Order of the Sons of America (Orden Hijos de América) and the Order of the Knights of America (Orden Caballeros de América), Mexican American organizations with various statewide chapters. Between 1927 and 1928, Perales and Ben Garza, leader of the Order of the Sons of America Council #4 in Corpus Christi, discussed how to merge these organizations.

In 1929, these organizations, along with the League of Latin American Citizens (headed by Perales), decided to merge to form the League of United Latin American Citizens (LULAC). Perales, thus, joined Garza, Manuel C. Gonzales, Andres de Luna Sr., Louis Wilmot, José Tomás Canales, Eduardo Idar Sr., Clemente Idar, J. Luz Saenz, John C. Solis, and Mauro Machado to found what would become the oldest Hispanic civil rights organization in the country, LULAC. Perales, with the help of Canales and Idar, drafted the LULAC constitution.

Perales went on to form LULAC Council 16 in San Antonio, Texas, and served as LULAC's second president. As president of LULAC, he focused on the creation of 24 new councils across South Texas. According to the LULAC News (LULAC's official newsletter), Perales helped to cement the organization's spirit: "LULAC is much indebted to the efforts and sacrifices put forth by these pioneers like Alonso S. Perales. It was this spirit of courage - tenacity, and self-sacrifice - during the early history of LULAC that became known as the 'LULAC Spirit.'"

Among his efforts was also the 1930 defeat of House Resolution 6465, also known as the Box Bill, introduced by U.S. Representative John C. Box, which proposed expanding the Immigration Act of 1924 to include quotas on Mexican immigrants to the United States. Perales, together with his fellow LULACers, Canales and Garza, traveled to Washington D.C. to testify in US congressional hearings against the bill. The bill did not pass.

== Honors and memorials ==
In 1977, the Edgewood Independent School District in San Antonio named the Alonso S. Perales Elementary School in his honor.

In 2011, the Perales family donated his archive to Arte Público Press and its historical arm, Recovering the US Hispanic Literary Heritage program. The collection includes correspondence, historic LULAC papers and publications, photographs, and rare manuscripts. It is housed at the University of Houston's MD Anderson Libraries Special Collections. Shortly after the donation, the organization held a Recovering the US Hispanic Literary Heritage academic conference dedicated to the work of Perales. The edited collection of scholarly essays, In Defense of my people: Alonso S. Perales and the development of Mexican-American public intellectuals, edited by Michael A. Olivas, was a result of the scholarship presented at the conference.

Using the collection stated above, a digital humanities project visually illustrating the spread of correspondences, documents, pictures, and manuscripts related to Perales and his work as well as information directly related to LULAC, is titled The Alonso S. Perales Correspondence.

Exhibits

The Mexican American Civil Rights Institute in San Antonio created an exhibit on his life in 2024. In 2025 Our Lady of the Lake (OLLU) sponsored the traveling exhibit adding a geographic timeline, linocut prints, and hands-on activities for school-aged children all by OLLU students.

== Works ==
- En Defensa de mi raza, vol. I & II. (Artes Gráficas, 1937)
- Are We Good Neighbors? (Artes Gráficas, 1948)
- "La Evolución De La Raza Mexicana En Texas," La Prensa (San Antonio, TX), Sep. 13, 1927.
