= Delgado v. Bastrop ISD =

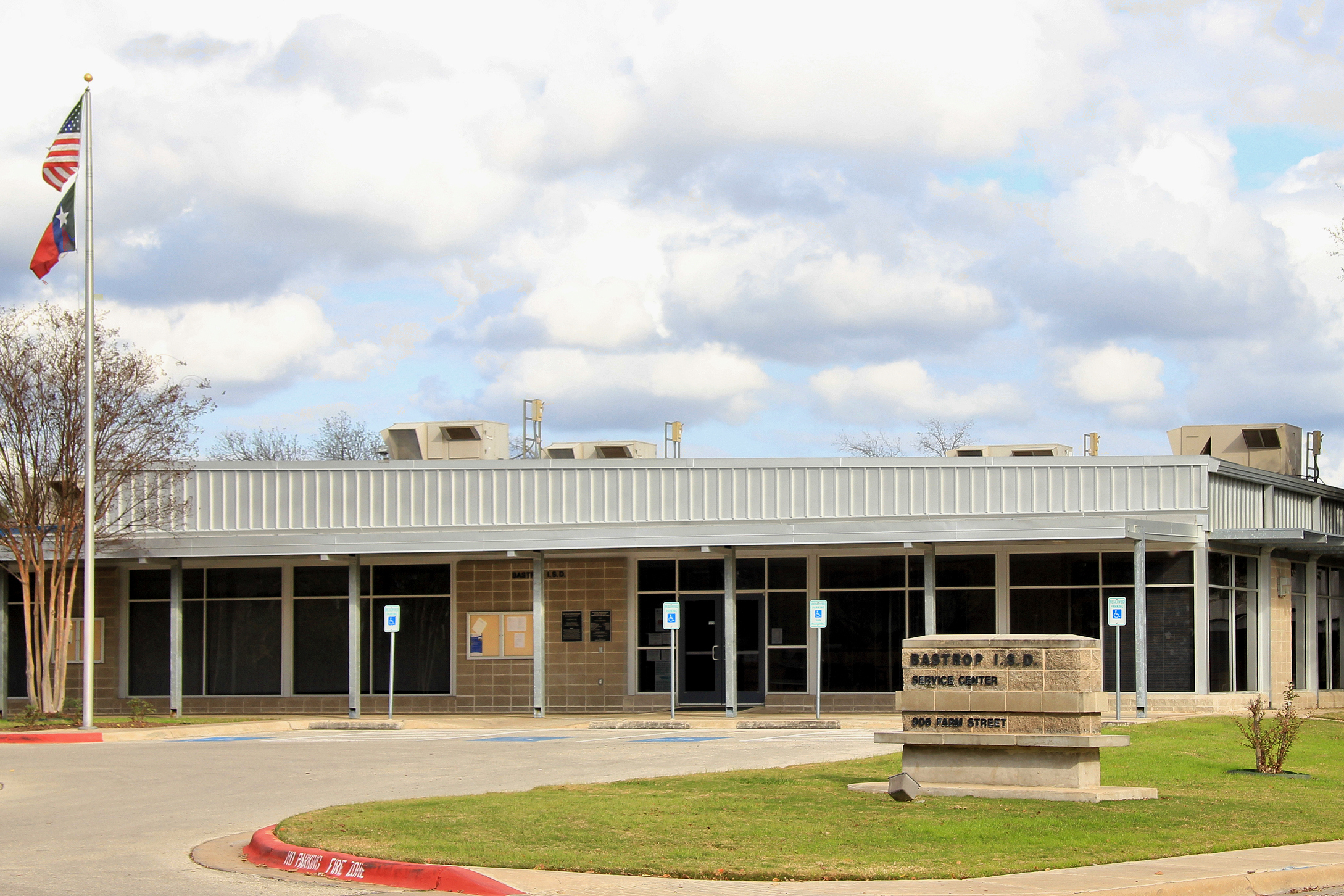
Bastrop ISD (2014)

Delgado V. Bastrop Independent School District was a Federal Circuit court case in 1948, based out of Bastrop county, that ruled against the segregation of Mexican-Americans in the public schools of Texas. The court's decision was argued on the standpoint of the Mendez et al. v. Westminster et al. court case and lack of Texas law for segregation of those of Mexican descent, and also stated that Mexican-Americans were separate from African-Americans as had been ruled in Plessy v. Ferguson. This case stated that except for the instance of separating individuals based on severe language difficulties in first grade, the school districts could not segregate their schools between Anglos and Mexican-Americans; moreover, the local school leaders and districts needed to take active action against it or they would also be liable for the results of segregated education. Though this case helped establish a baseline in the law against Mexican-American segregation in public schools, it took many more years and future lawsuits for action to follow through with the actual rulings of the court.

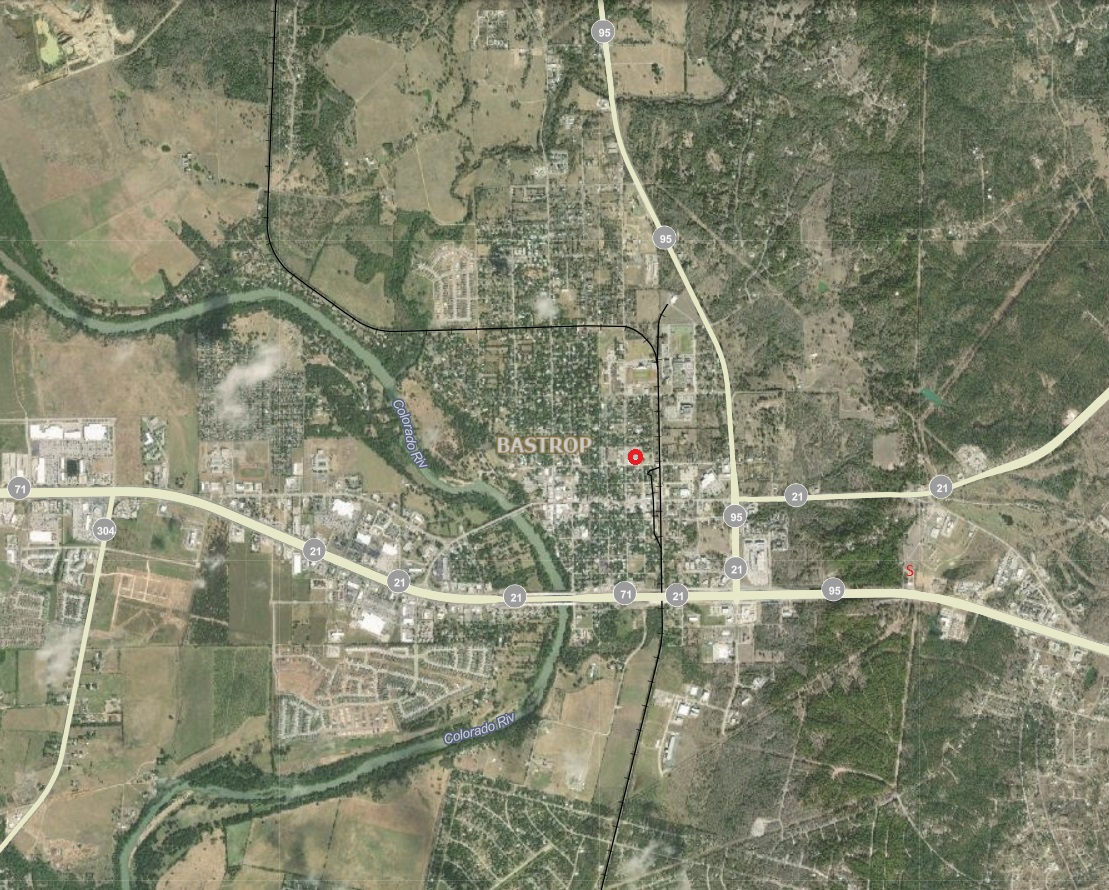
City of Bastrop (Mina Ward Elementary highlighted in red.) (Map from the United States Census Bureau)

The specifics of the case began when grandmother Namensia Garcia attempted to enroll her granddaughter Minerva Delgado in the public all White school in the town of Bastrop, but the superintendent of the Bastrop Independent School District refused and Minerva was denied admittance. Upon discovering the situation, the League of United Latin American Citizens (LULAC) along with the American G.I. Forum helped the Delgados and 19 other Mexican-American families to sue the school district for their failure to secure the constitutional rights of the students. In the end, the judge ruled in favor of the families and declared the segregation of students unconstitutional.

Despite the case victory, reality would take much longer to follow the court rulings. Following the court decision, de facto segregation continued in many schools and desegregation would not truly begin to take place until much later.

== Background information ==
During the decade of the 1940s, segregation and racism continued to pervade the United States, including the state of Texas. Although officially considered "White" under the Treaty of Guadalupe Hidalgo, social discrimination against Mexican-Americans continued; many of those against desegregation used it as a way to fight against the civil right activism and equality that the massive migrations northward for Latin America had brought about. At the time, Texan law had no direct pro-segregation legislation against Mexican-Americans (cases such as Plessy v. Ferguson only applied to African Americans), but de facto segregation was strongly enforced in direct contrast to the existing legislation much to the detriment of the Mexican-American community. At the time, the United States had no immigration limits on Mexican-Americans and had many opportunities for labor though they paid relatively little. These combined factors led to many working class Mexican-American families and school districts creating separate schools for Mexican-Americans including inside of the Bastrop Independent School District. Efforts of organizations such as the League of United Latin American Citizens among others in the early 1940s had begun to fight Mexican-American segregation in public areas and housing, but had yet to successfully turn their focus to the public school system. Previously in 1930, one court case, Del Rio I.S.D V Salvatierra, had attempted to fight against this segregation, but had failed. Then in 1946, two years previous to the Bastrop case, the judge in Mendez v. Westminster ruled against the segregation of Mexican-American children in public schools. This case occurred in California, but its arguments, based on the rights to equal protection and due process, could be applied elsewhere in the United States. Earlier that same year in Texas, the attorney general had also released a statement against racial segregation showing that some momentum had begun to shift, at least in public openness to the idea.

== Key figures ==
=== Gus Garcia ===
Gus Garcia was the leading attorney for the plaintiff Minerva family. As a native of Texas who graduated from the University of Texas at Austin receiving both his undergraduate and law degrees, Gus worked with LULAC during the duration of the trial. He, along with his counsel, A.L. Wirin, Robert C. Tekhardt, and Carlos C. Cadena, fought the case. After the case, Garcia would go on to continue working as a civil rights activist and be a strong supporter thereafter until the end of his life.

=== Judge Ben H. Rice ===
Judge Ben H. Rice was the district court judge in charge of hearing the lawsuit case from the families. Rice was born in Marlin, Texas, and like Garcia, was a graduate of the University of Texas undergraduate and law programs. He was nominated to the courts by President Harry S. Truman, and had begun serving in the U.S. District Court for the Western District of Texas as the Chief Judge in 1948. He continued in the legal system as a chief judge until his death in 1964.

=== The Delgado family ===
The Delgados were a low-income, Latino family of farmers that lived in Bastrop, Texas. The family consisted of Samuel García Sr. and Nanamensia García (Minerva's grandparents); Samuel's brother Felix García; Sulima García, Samuel García Jr., and Gamaliel García (aunt and uncles); and Gloria García (Minerva's Mother). Of them all, not a single member of the family had graduated from high school, but all continued living together as a family unit.

== League of United Latin American Citizens (LULAC) ==
The League of United Latin American Citizens is a civil rights organization focused on the rights of Latinos in the United States of America. It coordinated much of the work surrounding the Delgado case and provided much of the legal funding necessary for the lawsuit. Raising the funds was no small project and League of United Latin American Citizens raised as much as $10,252.26 ($107,094.74 in current day money) for the case through donations and other activities, an astounding amount to raise. These funds went to attorney's fees, travel, and clerical work among other things. The work and set up provided by the League of United Latin American Citizens was instrumental in the lawsuit's success.

== Development of the case ==
During this time period, the United States segregated Mexican-Americans from Whites in laws referred to as "Jaime Crow". However, within the Texas public school systems, including Bastrop Independent School District, policies regarding the separation of students of a Spanish origin were largely implemented by the various individual districts. Using scientific research from the time period, classes were segregated based on the belief that the language barrier needed to be overcome first for students to succeed in the classroom. To help instill English speaking into the segregated Mexican-American students, any Spanish words resulted in corporal punishment from educators. One such student, Minerva Delgado, was denied enrollment to a White school because of an inability to speak English. This led to a complaint being filed on November 17, 1947. The basis of the claim was that regardless of English fluency, students were being segregated based on their ethnicity. The core argument of Gus Garcia, A.L. Wirin, Robert C. Tekhardt, and Carlos C. Cadena focused on the fact that Mexican Americans were the same race as White American, which turned away from the preferred argument of segregation cases at the time. This argument stemmed from earlier protests when Mexicans were originally separated from the White race in the 1940 census. Along with this case using evidence of a lack of racial differentiation, $10,000 in damages was also requested for each of the 19 students involved in the case. The charges for damages were later dropped and the case was settled before meeting in court.

== Verdict and aftermath ==
Upon receiving the rapid verdict from Judge Rice on June 15, 1948, the Bastrop Independent School District along with the four districts included in the case, were expected to have all schools desegregated by September 1949. L.A. Woods, a member of the defense, was tasked with leading out the desegregation of the schools. The desegregation was not expected to be complete, as Judge Rice set guidelines of how segregation could occur in the first grade for the purpose of teaching English to students. This meant that regular checks for English proficiency would need to be administered. Due to being settled before meeting at the United States Federal District Court, national recognition fell short. Although national recognition was not received in the same expanse other school segregation cases were, for the Mexican-American community, the case was monumental. Through Mexican newspapers, however, publications could be found the next day on June 16, 1948, discussing the end of the Delgado v. Bastrop ISD (1948) case. L.A. Woods, the superintendent of the Bastrop Independent School District acted on his call from Judge Rice to end desegregation for reasons other than fluency. While some schools participated in the desegregation outlined in the court ruling, many schools did not change due to noncompliance. Leading to the future, more cases would need to be presented before the courts for complete segregation to be enacted.

== See also ==
- Juan Crow
