= League of United Latin American Citizens =

American organization

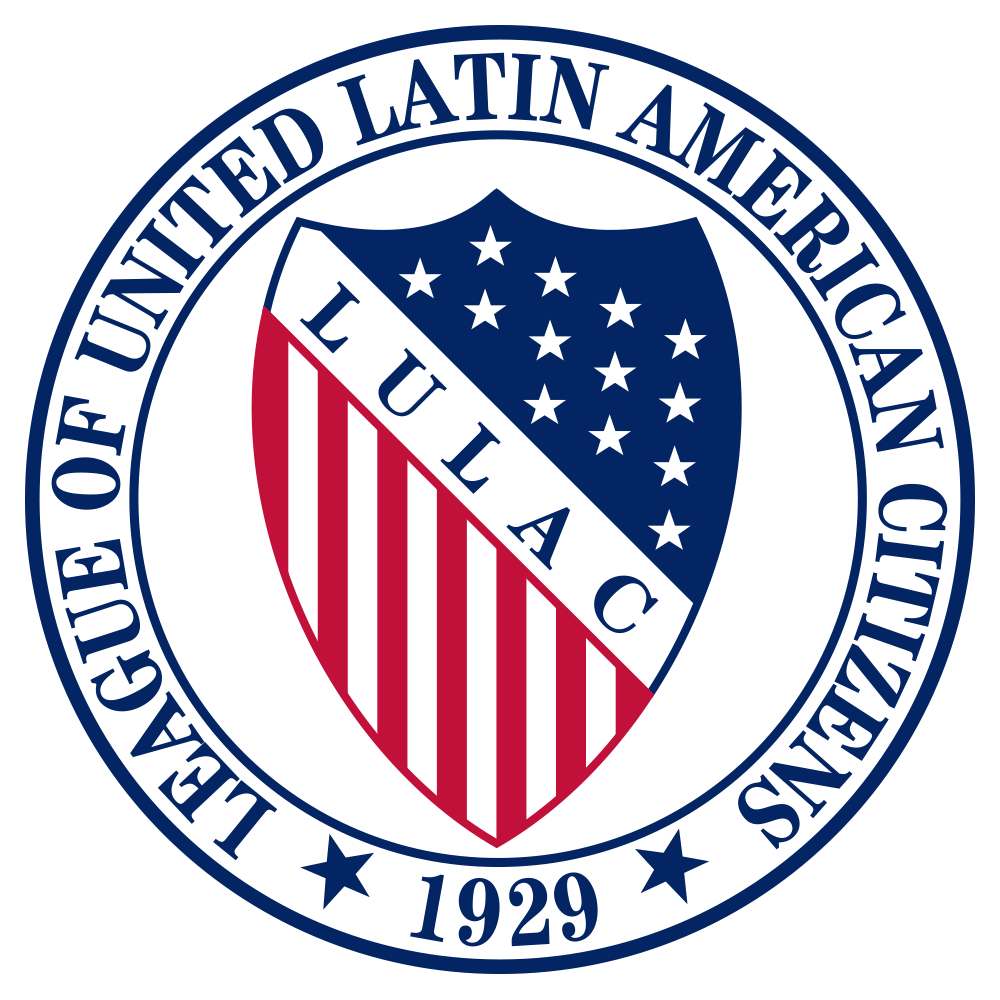
- Abbreviation: LULAC
- Formation: February 17, 1929; 97 years ago
- Purpose: "To advance the economic condition, educational attainment, political influence, housing, health and civil rights of the Hispanic population of the United States."
- Location(s): 1776 Eye Street, NW; Washington, DC
- Region served: United States
- Members: 264,151
- President: Roman Palomares
- CEO: Juan Proaño
- Main organ: Board of directors
- Website: Official website

The League of United Latin American Citizens (LULAC) is the largest and oldest Hispanic and Latin-American civil rights organization in the United States. It was established on February 17, 1929, in Corpus Christi, Texas, largely by Hispanics returning from World War I who sought to end ethnic discrimination against Latinos in the United States. The goal of LULAC is to advance the economic condition, educational attainment, political influence, housing, health, and civil rights of Hispanic people in the United States. LULAC uses nationwide councils and group community organizations to achieve all these goals. LULAC has about 264,000 members in the United States.

== Organization ==
LULAC helps to promote education among Latin Americans in America. LULAC councils provide about one million dollars in scholarships to Hispanics every year. LULAC provides educational programming to disadvantaged youth throughout America. They help out 18,000 Hispanics every year. They also help Hispanics train for jobs. They have programs that provide job skills and literacy training to the Hispanic community in America.

=== Comparisons with the NAACP ===
With respect to organizational structure, the League of Latin American Citizens was similar to the National Association for the Advancement of Colored People (NAACP). David G. Gutierrez said, "considering themselves part of a progressive and enlightened leadership elite, LULAC's leaders set out to implement general goals and a political strategy that were similar in form and content to those advocated early in the century by W.E.B. Du Bois and the National Association for the Advancement of Colored People: for an 'educated elite'".

Though the two civil rights groups may have possessed some institutional similarities, LULAC tried to establish distance from the African American civil rights struggle. As LULAC believed that blacks were more oppressed than Latinos; its members thought that joining forces would not strengthen its own struggle for equality. LULAC asserted that Hispanics properly fell into the "white" category of the dichotomous black-white construction of race. In 1936 the league "engaged in a series of lobbying activities as soon as it [the USCB] perceived that Mexican Americans would be categorized as part of a group of dark-skinned minorities." They lobbied to demonstrate that Hispanic, Latino and Mexican American were not racial classifications, but cultural groups who were racially diverse, sharing a common ethnolinguistic ancestry.

== History ==
=== Founders ===
Ben Garza; Manuel C. Gonzales; Andres de Luna; Louis Wilmot; Alonso S. Perales; Rafael Galvan Sr.; Juan Galvan; Vicente Lozano; José Tomás Canales; Edwardo Idar; Mauro Machado; José de la Luz Sáenz; Juan C. Solis; E.H. Marin

=== Formation ===
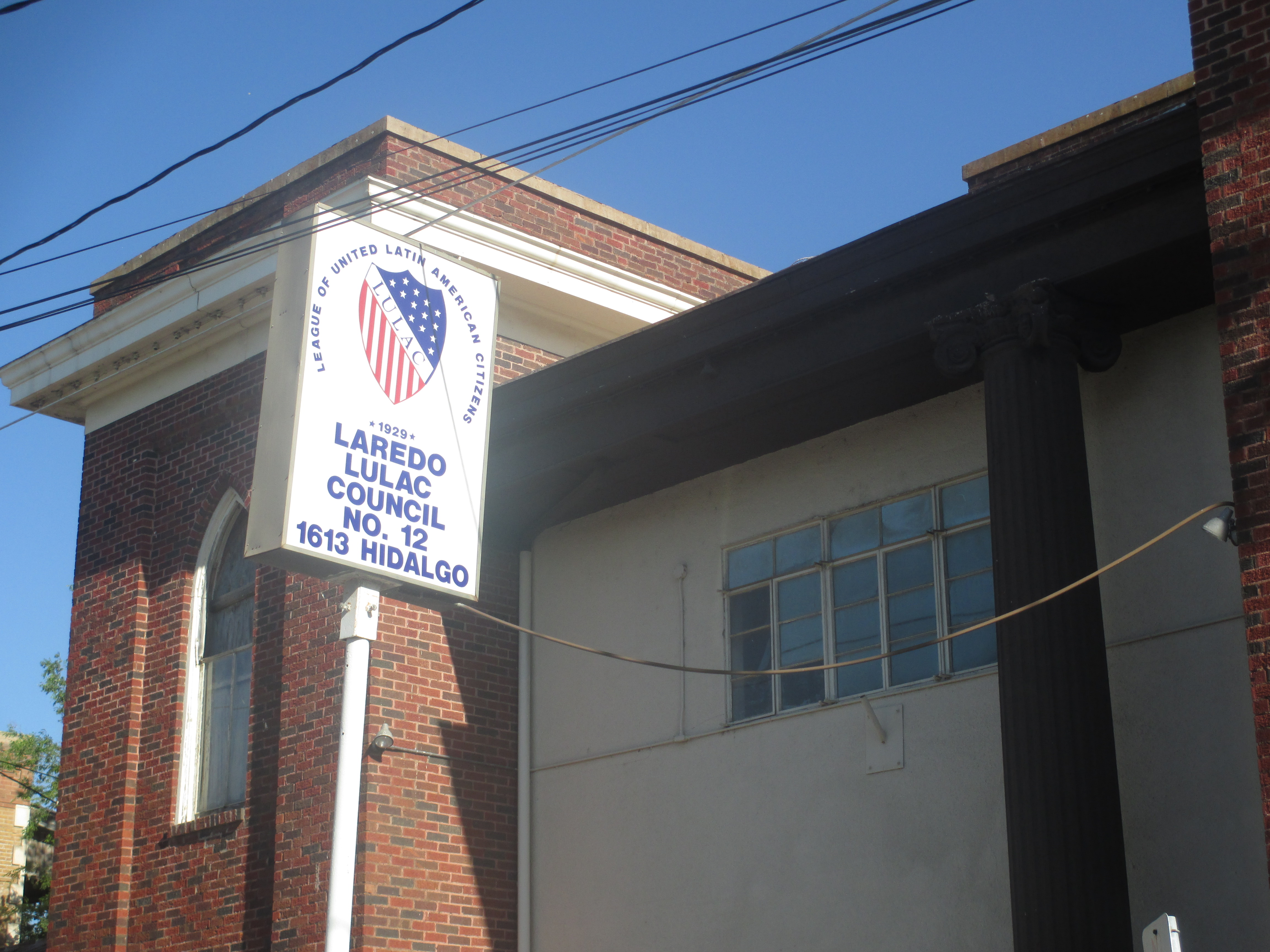
The LULAC No. 12 hall in Laredo, Texas, first established in 1929

LULAC was formed in 1929 as a result of the merger of several small groups also concerned with the status of Mexican Americans: the Order of the Sons of America (El Orden Hijos de America), the Order of the Knights of America (El Orden Caballeros de America) and the League of Latino American Citizens. From an early date, women organized separate Ladies Councils within LULAC. Overall, LULAC struggled to use the political system to erase discriminatory laws and practices in the U.S. Southwest. Although it was a nonpartisan group, it encouraged members to vote for candidates who were supportive of the group's ideals.

The first LULAC General Convention was held in Corpus Christi, Texas on May 18, 1929, at Allende Hall owned by Rafael Galvan, Sr. and Samuel Hinojosa. The first LULAC constitution was adopted. During the 1930s, LULAC's activities included voter-registration and petition drives; attempts to repeal the poll tax imposed in several states, which reduced its members' ability to register; and litigation to improve the conditions of Mexican Americans. They also worked to improve education for Mexican Americans by conducting community-education campaigns and setting up a college scholarship program. These activities conformed with existing institutional structures in the United States. A major event was the 1930 court case of Del Rio ISD v. Salvatierra, in which LULAC sued Del Rio Independent School District in for segregating Mexican Americans due to their race. Although the court was not fully favorable in its ruling, the case made an important inroad for desegregation cases to come.

=== Mexican Repatriation ===
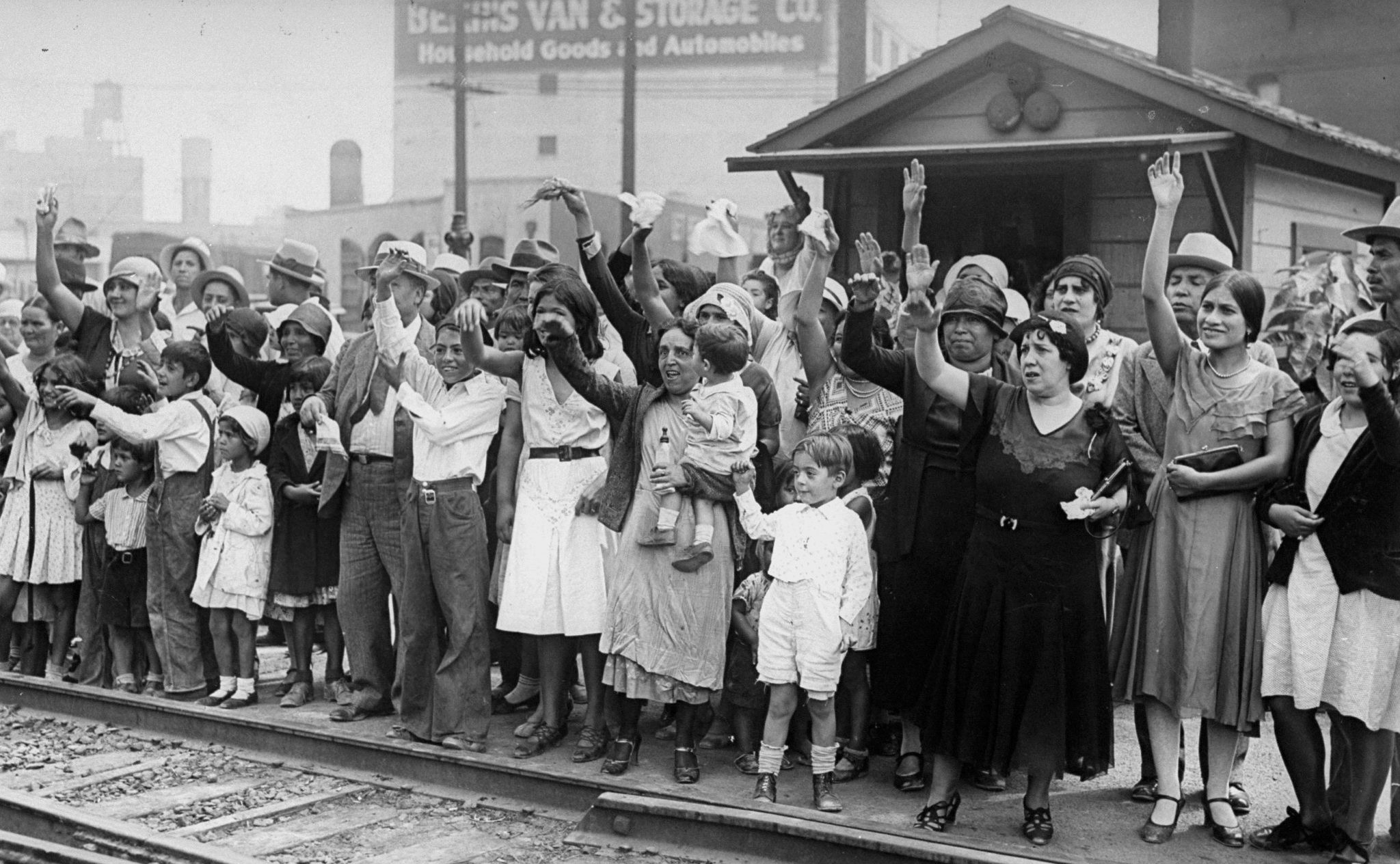
LULAC's assimilation ideology emerged during the mass deportations occurring in the Mexican Repatriation.

LULAC followed an assimilation ideology which emerged among cholos groups around the time of the Great Depression in the United States.Although the United States had recruited Mexican workers during the first quarter century, the economic problems of the depression increased animosity against immigrants and minority groups as people competed for work. In response to such sentiment, the federal government deported an estimated 500,000 Mexican nationals and Mexican Americans (including some American citizens) during the Depression to keep more work for US citizens. As a result, the proportion of native-born Americans among the total ethnic Mexican population was higher than had been the case in previous decades, and many grew up in United States culture rather than among immigrant communities. Benjamin Marquez asserts, "This demographic shift favored the rise of a more assimilated political leadership". Earlier organizations, such as mutual-aid associations (mutualistas) and labor-based groups, had emphasized pan-Mexican cooperation among recent immigrants from Mexico, Mexican national residents, and Mexican Americans to combat economic, cultural, and political discrimination. But as LULAC has been interested in assimilation to the US, it admitted as members only those ethnic Mexicans who were United States citizens.

=== Migration and assimilation ===
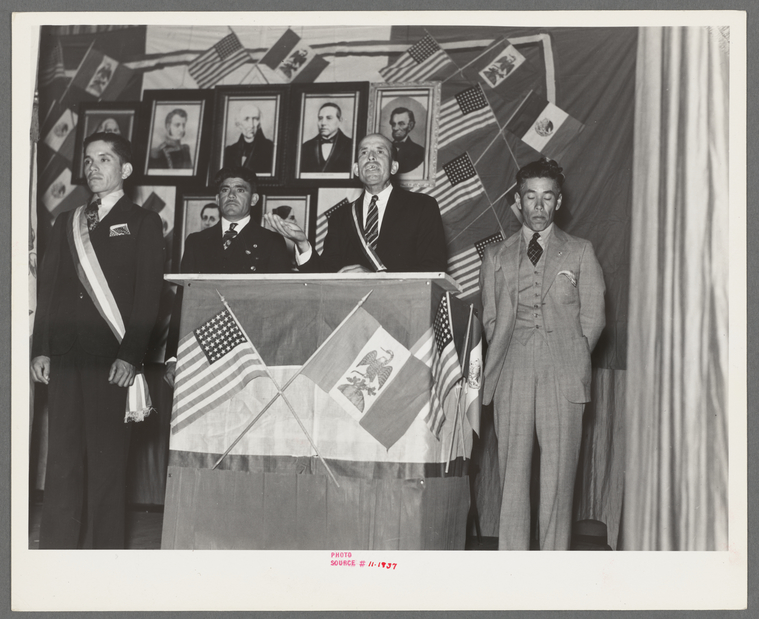
LULAC encouraged assimilation of its members into white U.S. culture.

LULAC promoted the full adaptation of its members into the dominant European-American culture, in the belief that this strategy would be the most successful way to combat discrimination. The organization claimed that discrimination was caused by racism, not by the economic or political systems. LULAC promoted capitalism and individualism; its leaders believed that, through hard work and assimilation into American culture, Mexican Americans could improve their socio-economic standing.

LULAC emphasized American patriotism as a path to assimilation. It asserted that Mexican Americans should disavow any allegiance to Mexico, remain permanently in the United States, and commit fully to democratic ideals. The league's official song is "America"; its official language is English; and its official prayer is the "George Washington Prayer". The LULAC's constitution is modeled on the United States Constitution.

Because of LULAC's assimilation ideology and its advancement of the interests of Mexican-American citizens, it advocated restrictions on immigration. LULAC's central means of achieving equal status with European Americans was dependent on promoting the image of Mexican residents as conforming to the cultural norms of the United States. The League recognized that most of the dominant society did not distinguish among the cultures and attitudes of immigrants, citizens, and naturalized persons of Mexican descent.

New immigrants from Mexico resisted the assimilation strategy, as they had stronger ties to their native culture, limited English proficiency, and were willing to work for low wages. Some Mexican Americans knew that they would be lumped together with the recent immigrants and be perceived as "un-American", "backward", and "poor", and would be discriminated against. The league members shared the fear of many working-class Americans that the new immigrants, willing to work for low wages and contributing to job competition against Mexican Americans due to their numbers, would economically harm Mexican American citizens. While other ethnic groups had similar tensions between more settled citizens and new immigrants (such as between German Jews and more recent immigrants of Eastern European Ashkenazi Jews at the end of the nineteenth century), a major difference for Mexicans and Mexican Americans was the continuing high rate of immigration into the United States, strengthening ties to the homeland culture and language.

=== Role of women ===
LULAC was one of the first national organizations to place emphasis on the role of women. It created ladies' auxiliaries in 1932. The following year, in LULAC's annual statewide convention, Ladies LULAC councils were established. By 1938, the first women's national office was created. State coordinators for women carry out local programs for women. There are many different programs and conferences for women created by the league. Like "Adelante Mujer Hispana" and two-day conferences that discuss education and employment.

Belen Robles served as the first national president of LULAC, starting in 1994.

=== After World War II ===
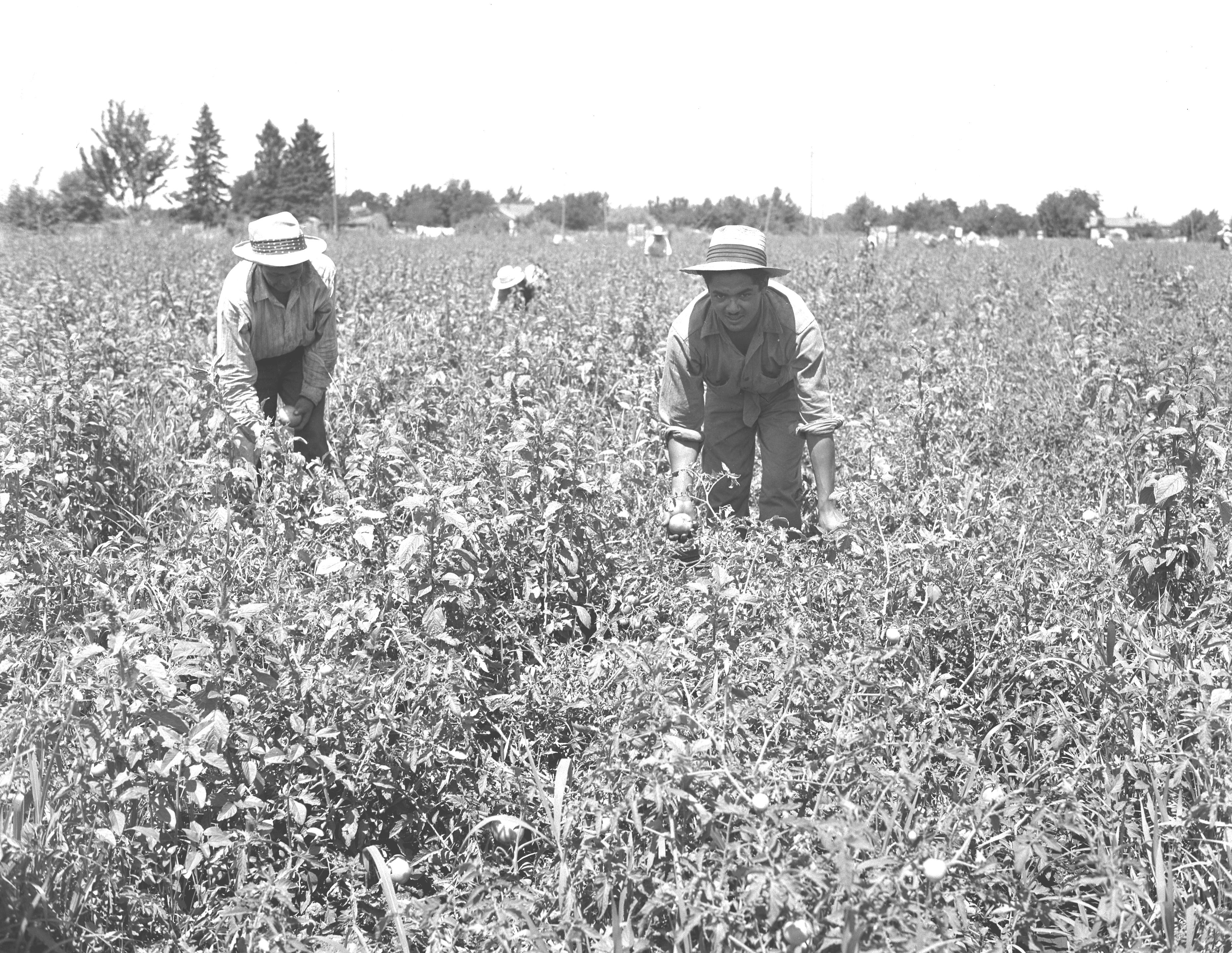
Braceros picking tomatoes. LULAC fought against the extension of the program, calling it "legalized slavery".

During World War II the membership and activity of the organization decreased significantly. Many of its members joined or were drafted into the armed forces. LULAC campaigned against the Emergency Farm Labor Program (also known as the Bracero Program), which began in 1942 to fill the farm-labor shortage that resulted from the draft following the US entry into World War II. Although Mexican workers in this program were under contract with the government to go to the United States to work and to return to Mexico after a set amount of time, LULAC saw the program as paving the way for increased permanent immigration from Mexico. LULAC's opposition to the Bracero Program was consistent with its support for restricted immigration, as described earlier.

After the war, LULAC was revived by the enthusiasm of returning veterans who sought to claim the civil liberties they believed they had earned by their loyal military service. The group continued to help the Mexican community with local activities such as Christmas toy drives, sponsoring Boy Scout troops, and campaigns against poll taxes.

=== School desegregation ===
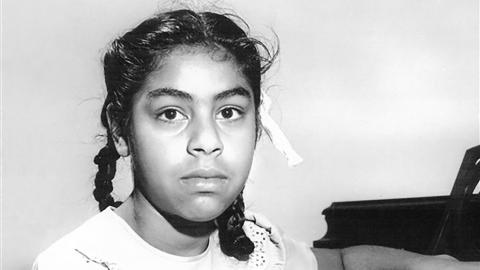
Sylvia Mendez, the plaintiff in the Mendez v. Westminster case

During the 1950s, LULAC began the Little School of the 400 program, which was designed to teach Mexican-American children 400 English words before they began first grade. The project was initially run by volunteers, and shown after the first class to be successful in preparing children to do better in school; out of 60 participating children, only one had to repeat the first grade. The program expanded, and LULAC convinced the Texas legislature to underwrite it. Between 1960 and 1964 over 92,000 children benefited from the LULAC-initiated, English-centered preschool program.

LULAC also sued school districts which practiced segregation. Examples of successful cases include Mendez v. Westminster in 1945 and Delgado v. Bastrop ISD in 1948. In the Mendez case, Thurgood Marshall, then a lawyer for the National Association for the Advancement of Colored People (NAACP) filed an amicus brief in support of LULAC. As Marquez notes, "Relying strictly on the volunteer labor of LULAC attorneys and their staff, from 1950 to 1957, approximately fifteen suits or complaints were filed against school districts throughout the Southwest". These victories contributed precedents that were consulted in the deliberation by the United States Supreme Court in the Brown v. Board of Education (1954) case. In 1965, the 146 Councils were distributed among eight states, and by 1977, LULAC had offices in 21 states.

Benjamin Marquez asserts, "Segregated schools, inferior equipment, and the lack of qualified teachers were seen as the primary obstacles to the full economic and social assimilation of the Mexican American". LULAC believed that the public-school system, with the aforementioned issues corrected, would serve as a central instrument in the assimilation process of children, and thereby the Mexican-American community as a whole. It fully supported education of its members and adoption of fluent English. They believed that through formal education, Mexican Americans would learn how to function in American institutions, socialize with European-American children, and gain education to qualify for higher skilled jobs.

=== Chicano Movement ===
The rise of more radical groups in the 1960s brought change to LULAC. They began to turn away from supporting assimilation. They began to use public protest to bring attention to their cause. The group also began to seek government funding and grants to help build support for the group.

=== Late-20th century ===
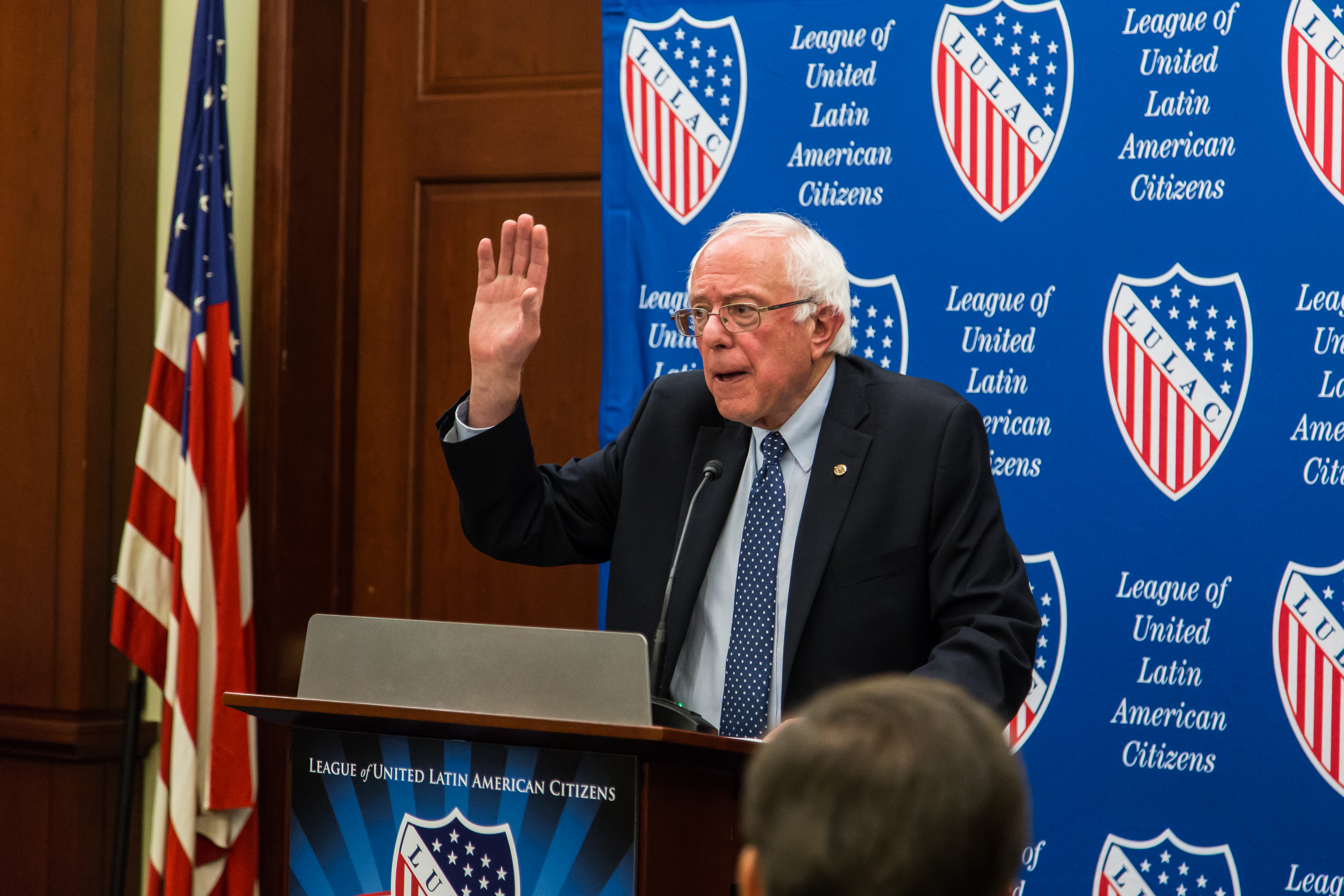
Senator Bernie Sanders at a USFWS and LULAC event in October 2015

Despite national visibility, LULAC lost strength since the late-twentieth century, with declines in membership and operating funds because of competition from other Mexican-American groups. According to Benjamin Marquez, LULAC found it difficult to meet the needs and desires of an increasingly diverse Mexican-American population, in which immigrants have made up an increasingly higher proportion. He writes, "While the league's public profile grew in the mid-1960s, and the group was involved in a wide range of political activities, these events occurred with decreasing mass participation".

== Local council impact ==
Founded in Corpus Christi in 1929, LULAC expanded first in Texas, adding 18 councils the next year. More were added in the next decade, but again mostly in Texas. With World War II, LULAC began to extend its reach to California, Arizona, New Mexico, and later Colorado. Victory in a precedent-setting 1945 lawsuit challenging segregation of Mexican American students in Orange County, California, helped the organization grow. LULAC claimed 2,500 members in 1951 and the number of chapters reached 83 in 1955 shortly after another pivotal legal victory (Hernandez v. Texas). The next decade brought LULAC new influence and a new geography, reflecting the Tejano diaspora that was now spreading into the upper Midwest. In 1965 the 146 Councils were distributed among eight states. By 1977, LULAC had a presence in 21 states yet the total number of Councils had declined. But in 1988, LULAC saw a resurgence in new Councils as 551 were founded bringing the total to over 600. LULAC Councils and state offices were in 32 states including Washington, D.C., and Puerto Rico, and reaching new geographies in the Upper East Coast and Florida. From an early date women organized separate Ladies Councils.

== Current activities ==
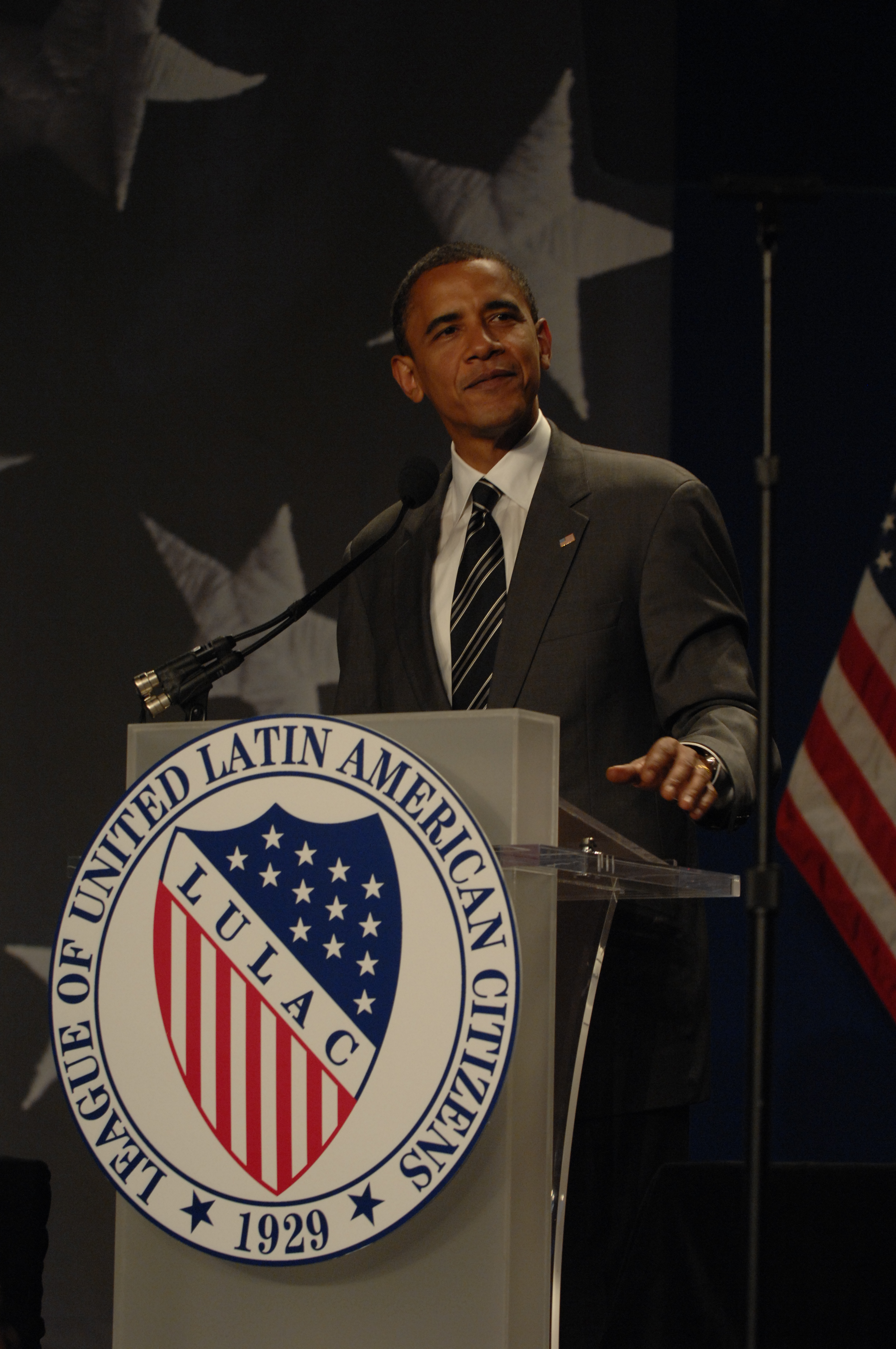
Barack Obama, then a US Senator, addresses the League of United Latin American Citizens.

=== Education ===
The LULAC National Educational Service Centers (LNESC) are part of a non-profit educational advancement organization which helps students with direct-service programs and scholarships.

=== Legal campaigns ===
Roger Rocha (born c. 1971), a health-care analyst from Laredo, Texas, was elected as the 2015 LULAC president at the annual meeting held in Salt Lake City, Utah. He vowed to push for unity in the organization. In July 2017, Rocha strongly endorsed the lawsuit against Texas Senate Bill 4 which ends sanctuary cities in the state. The measure, signed into law by Governor Greg Abbott, permits law enforcement officers to inquire about the legal documentation of suspects detained for other reasons. Rocha claims that the bill was "specifically created to target Latinos", the largest minority group in Texas.

In 2018, the Richmond Council for LULAC and four individual voters filed a federal lawsuit, LULAC of Richmond v. Public Interest Legal Foundation, in the Eastern District of Virginia against the Public Interest Legal Foundation for false reports about non-citizen voters published online. The lawsuit claimed violations of the Ku Klux Klan Act and the Voting Rights Act, as well as state defamation laws. The plaintiffs were successful.

== See also ==
- American GI Forum (AGIF)
- Hispanic and Latino Americans
- Labor Council for Latin American Advancement (LCLAA)
- League of United Latin American Citizens v. Perry
- MALDEF
- Mexican-American Education Council (MAEC)
- Mi Familia Vota
- National Association of Latino Elected and Appointed Officials (NALEO)
- National Council of La Raza (NCLR)
- National Immigration Forum
- Nativism (politics) in the United States#Hispanic targets
- Southwest Voter Registration Education Project, (SVREP)
- History of education in Texas
- History of education in California
