= List of museums in Orange County, California =

This is a list of museums in Orange County, California, defined for this context as institutions (including nonprofit organizations, government entities, and private businesses) that collect and care for objects of cultural, artistic, scientific, or historical interest and make their collections or related exhibits available for public viewing. Also included are non-profit and university art galleries. Museums that exist only in cyberspace (i.e., virtual museums) are not included.

To use the sortable tables: click on the icons at the top of each column to sort that column in alphabetical order; click again for reverse alphabetical order.

== Museums ==
Name	Town/City	Type	Summary
Arden Modjeska Historic Home & Garden	Lake Forest	Historic house	Open by appointment, home of Shakespearean actress Helena Modjeska
Astor Classics Event Center	Anaheim	Multiple	automobile museum and communications & radio museum
Balboa Island Museum	Balboa Island	Local history	operated by the Balboa Island Historical Society
Bowers Museum	Santa Ana	Multiple	Orange County history, Native American, African, Pre-Columbian and Asian art, paintings, South American ethnographic items, decorative arts, natural history
Bradford House	Placentia	Historic house	Operated by the Placentia Founders Society, furnished in 1900-1920s style
Beall Center for Art + Technology	Irvine	Art	part of the Claire Trevor School of the Arts at University of California, Irvine, exhibitions that explore new relationships between the arts, sciences, and engineering including digital technologies
Brea Museum and Heritage Center	Brea	Local history	operated by the Brea Historical Society
Casa Romantica	San Clemente	Art	Cultural arts institution and botanical gardens with international art exhibits in historic Ole Hanson home
Children's Museum at La Habra	La Habra	Children's	
Costa Mesa Historical Society Museum	Costa Mesa	Local history	
CSUF Grand Central Art Center	Santa Ana	Art	Contemporary art center with a theatre
Diego Sepúlveda Adobe	Costa Mesa	Historic house	Operated by the Costa Mesa Historical Society, early 19th-century adobe house with rooms reflecting the Indian, Mission, Spanish and Victorian periods
Discovery Cube Orange County	Santa Ana	Science	
Dr. Willella Howe-Waffle House and Medical Museum	Santa Ana	Historic house	Operated by the Santa Ana Historical Preservation Society, late 19th century home of a female physician
ExplorOcean	Newport Beach	Maritime	formerly the Newport Harbor Nautical Museum, marine aquariums and touch tanks, ship models, life on the ocean floor
Fullerton Arboretum	Fullerton	Multiple	Includes the Orange County Agricultural and Nikkei Heritage Museum, and Heritage House, an 1890s Victorian house museum
Fullerton Museum	Fullerton	Multiple	history, cultural and fine arts, and sciences
George Key Ranch Historic Park	Placentia	Historic house	1898 historic house and collection of dry farming and citrus farming equipment and tools
Heritage Hill Historic Park	Lake Forest	Open air	Includes the Jose Serrano Adobe, 1863; El Toro Grammar School, 1890; St. George's Episcopal Mission, 1891; Harvey Bennett Ranch House, 1908
Heritage Museum of Orange County	Santa Ana	Historic house	Victorian-era Hiram Kellogg House, exhibits of local history, formerly the Centennial Heritage Museum
Hilbert Museum of California Art at Chapman University	Orange	Art	collection focuses on the California Scene Painting movement of roughly the 1920s through the 1970s and has a Disney Production Art gallery, as well as exhibitions of American illustrations and contemporary California scene painting.
International Surfing Museum	Huntington Beach	Sports	History of the surfing culture throughout the world
Irvine Fine Arts Center	Irvine	Art	municipal fine arts center
Irvine Historical Museum	Irvine	Historic house	operated by the Irvine Historical Society, mid 19th-century ranch house
Jack & Shanaz Langson Institute & Museum of California Art (Langson IMCA)	Irvine	Art	California art from the impressionist period 1890–1930 to contemporary works. Major collections are the Irvine Museum collection and the Buck Collection
Kawasaki Museum	Lake Forest	Motorcycles	
Laguna Art Museum	Laguna Beach	Art	California art
Los Alamitos Museum	Los Alamitos	Local history	
Lyon Air Museum	Santa Ana	Aerospace	Located at John Wayne Airport, features military aircraft, rare automobiles, military vehicles and motorcycles, related memorabilia, with an emphasis World War II
Marconi Automotive Museum	Tustin	Automotive	historical, exotic, and classic cars including super bikes, open wheel racing cars, American muscle cars, vintage racing and high performance exotics
Mission San Juan Capistrano	San Juan Capistrano	History	Remains of the historic Spanish mission and church
Mother Colony House	Anaheim	Historic house	George Hansen, superintendent of the Los Angeles Vineyard Society, built the house in 1857, one of the first buildings constructed in Anaheim, and the oldest remaining wood-framed building in Orange County.
Muckenthaler Cultural Center	Fullerton	Art	Cultural arts center with exhibit gallery
Murphy-Smith Bungalow	Laguna Beach	Local history	operated by the Laguna Beach Historical Society, 1920's beach cottage with local history displays
Museum of Teaching and Learning	Fullerton	Multiple	educational artifacts and traveling exhibitions about topics related to education
Museum of The Republic of Vietnam	Westminster	Military History	History of the Republic of Vietnam and its Military
Muzeo	Anaheim	Multiple	Changing exhibitions about the arts, knowledge, entertainment, culture and local history
Newland House	Huntington Beach	Historic house	Oldest residence in the city of Huntington Beach, operated by the Huntington Beach Historical Society
Ocean Institute	Dana Point	Maritime	Open to the public seven days a week, features marine life aquariums and marine science exhibits and programs
Old Orange County Courthouse	Santa Ana	Local history	Contains the Orange County History Center
Olinda Oil Museum and Trail	Brea	Local history	Contains original buildings and artifacts from the Olinda Oil Lease beginning in 1897 and a hiking trail
Orange County Center for Contemporary Art	Santa Ana	Art	
Orange County Museum of Art	Santa Ana	Art	Modern and contemporary art
Pretend City Children's Museum	Irvine	Children's	
Ralph B. Clark Regional Park Interpretive Center	Buena Park	Natural history	Features an ice age fossil and local geology exhibits
Ramon Peralta Adobe	Anaheim	Historic house	mid 19th-century adobe house, exhibits on the history of the Santa Ana Canyon area, open for special events and by appointment
Richard Nixon Presidential Library and Museum	Yorba Linda	Biographical	Life of President Richard Nixon, includes his birthplace home
Santa Ana Fire Department Museum	Santa Ana	Firefighting	
Stanley Ranch Museum	Garden Grove	Open air	Operated by the Garden Grove Historical Society, includes several historic buildings from the 1880s to early 1900s
Surfing Heritage and Culture Center	San Clemente	Sports	
Susanna Bixby Bryant Museum and Botanic Garden	Yorba Linda	Local history	operated by the Yorba Linda Heritage Museum and Historical Society
Tustin Area Museum	Tustin	Local history	operated by the Tustin Area Historical Society
University of California, Irvine University Art Galleries	Irvine	Art	3 galleries on campus
Westminster Museum	Westminster	Open air	operated by the Westminster Historical Society in Blakey Historical Park
Whitaker-Jaynes House	Buena Park	Historic house	turn of the 20th-century Victorian period house, operated by the Buena Park Historical Society, also the late 19th-century Bacon House, home of a miner's family

== See also ==
- List of museums in California

== Defunct museums ==
- Briggs Cunningham Museum, an automotive museum in Costa Mesa, closed in 1986
- Irvine Museum, Irvine, collection donated to UCI in 2016 to form part of the Langson IMCA
- Movieland Wax Museum, Buena Park
- Newport Sports Museum, Newport Beach, closed in 2014
