= Westminster School District =

Public school district in Orange County, California (USA)

Address
- 14121 Cedarwood Street Westminster, Orange County, California, 92683; United States
- Coordinates: 33.7574°N 117.9945°W

District information
- Type: Public
- Grades: Pre-K through 8^{th}
- Established: 1872; 154 years ago
- President: Jeremy Khalaf
- Vice-president: Khanh Nguyen
- Superintendent: Gunn Marie Hansen, Ph.D.
- Asst. superintendent(s): Rich Montgomery
- Business administrator: Manuel Cardoso Jr.
- Director of education: Richard J. Noblett, Ed.D.
- Schools: 17: Elementary: 13; Lower Secondary: 3; Child development: 1
- NCES District ID: 0642150

Students and staff
- Enrollment: 9,338 (2016-17)
- Teachers: 394.06 FTE
- Student–teacher ratio: 23.7

Other information
- Website: www.wsdk8.us
- Location of district office (blue map pin) within Orange County (shown in orange)

The Westminster School District (WSD) is an elementary school district in Orange County, California, established in 1872 and headquartered in Westminster. It operates schools in Westminster, Garden Grove, Huntington Beach, and Midway City.

It operates elementary and middle schools. High school students attend schools in the Huntington Beach Union High School District as well as in the Garden Grove Unified School District.

Racial segregation and discrimination against Mexican-American students by the school district resulted in a 1947 federal court case, Mendez v. Westminster, which ordered desegregation of the district's schools, so that Mexican and non-Mexican children attended the same schools. The plaintiffs had argued that Mexican-Americans were white and therefore should be allowed to attend the schools reserved for white children. The courts ruled that even if the students were not white, public schools "must be open to all children by unified school association regardless of lineage", except when segregation was explicitly authorized by state law.

== List of schools ==
=== Elementary schools ===
- Anderson Elementary (K–6, Garden Grove)
- Clegg Elementary (K–5, Huntington Beach)
- DeMille Elementary (K–6, Midway City)
- Eastwood Elementary (K–6, Westminster)
- Finley Elementary (K–5, Westminster)
- Fryberger Elementary (K–5, Westminster)
- Hayden Elementary (K–5, Midway City)
- Meairs Elementary (K–5, Garden Grove)
- Schmitt Elementary (K–5, Westminster)
- Schroeder Elementary (K–6, Huntington Beach)
- Sequoia Elementary (K–6, Westminster)
- Webber Elementary (K–6, Westminster)
- Willmore Elementary (K–6, Westminster)

=== Middle schools ===
- Stacey Middle (6–8, Huntington Beach)
- Johnson Middle (6–8, Westminster)
- Warner Middle (6–8, Westminster)

=== Child development schools ===
- John F. Land School (Westminster)

=== Closed schools ===
- Franklin School (Westminster)
- 17th Street (Westminster)
- Hoover Elementary (Westminster)
- Midway City Elementary (Midway City)
- Virginia K. Boos / Barber City Elementary (Barber City)
- Cook Elementary 14401 Willow Ln., Westminster, CA 92683
- Gil Elementary 15252 Victoria Ln, Huntington Beach, CA 92647

== Historic references ==
An important precursor to the desegregation of schools across the nation, the Westminster School District was the defendant in the groundbreaking litigation Mendez v. Westminster. Five Mexican-American families sued on behalf of thousands of students who were forced to attend substandard schools within the district. Ultimately, the court ordered the school district to allow students of Mexican descent to attend schools that had been previously reserved for only white students.

The case proved to be an important training-ground for Brown v. Board of Education. Thurgood Marshall authored an amicus curiae brief on behalf of the NAACP in favor of integration and later argued the merits before the Supreme Court in Brown. After the Mendez case, Governor Earl Warren led the call for full integration of California public schools. Additionally, the untimely death of Chief Justice Vinson during the Court's recess and the ascendancy of Earl Warren to the position of Chief Justice made the favorable ruling in Brown possible.

In 2015, Westminster School District became the first school district in the State of California to offer a Vietnamese-English Dual Immersion Program. The program was first proposed in 2014 by Board Member Jamison Power, whose wife is Vietnamese-American. The program was implemented by the district's first minority Superintendent, Dr. Marian Kim-Phelps and the Director of the Office of Language Acquisition, Dr. Renae Bryant, after the board consisting of Jamison Power, Mary Mangold, Amy Walsh, Dave Bridgewaters, and Penny Loomer unanimously approved moving forward with implementing the program. In 2017, the program received the prestigious California School Boards Association Golden Bell award.

== See also ==
- Ocean View School District
