= Edison High School (Huntington Beach, California) =

Coordinates: 33.6521°N 117.9694°W

Location
- 21400 Magnolia Street; Huntington Beach, California

Information
- Type: Public High School
- Established: 1968
- School district: Huntington Beach Union High School District
- Principal: Matt White
- Teaching staff: 93.98 (FTE)
- Grades: 9-12
- Enrollment: 2,011 (2023-2024)
- Student to teacher ratio: 21.40
- Campus: Suburban
- Colors: Green and Gold
- Athletics conference: CIF Southern Section; Sunset League
- Team name: Chargers
- Rival: Fountain Valley High School
- Website: www.edisonchargers.com

Edison High School is a public high school located in Huntington Beach, California, which first began operation in 1969. It is a part of the Huntington Beach Union High School District. Edison is a California Distinguished School. The graduation rate at Edison is 96.5%. 63% of Edison graduates attend a four-year university and 34% attend community college or trade school. Twenty nine total AP, Honors, and Accelerated level courses are offered at Edison. Edison is a largely sports-centered high school, with 31 CIF championships and 281 League championships.

== History ==
The school was built on land donated by Southern California Edison, from which its name is derived. The Huntington Beach Union High School District created the school to meet the needs of the growing Huntington Beach population. During the 1970s, Edison High School served the second largest student population west of the Mississippi River.

== Academic programs ==
=== Model United Nations ===
The Model United Nations (MUN) program at Edison simulates United Nations committees in order to teach students skills of research, public speaking, debating, and writing, as well as critical thinking, teamwork, and leadership. This Honors-level program also teaches students basic social studies information alongside MUN assignments, projects, and conferences. After Freshman year, a typically small cut occurs, allowing only two classes (seventy-four students) as Sophomores in MUN. After Sophomore year, the program is typically reduced to one class, which remains until Senior year. Edison MUN typically competes in both local and national conferences throughout the year against other top programs. During Sophomore year delegates typically travel to UC Berkeley in the spring to compete at BMUN. During Junior year delegates typically go to New York in the spring for NHSMUN. Edison MUN also holds the Edison MUN Fall Conference and Edison MUN Novice Conference in the winter for delegates from other schools.

== Notable alumni ==
- Willie Aames, American actor, director, producer
- Mark Boyer, former NFL player
- Jack Clark, Rugby player, coach, and U.S. Rugby Hall of Fame
- Rick DiBernardo, Former professional football player (NFL)
- Austin D’Amond, drummer for heavy metal band Bleed The Sky
- Marcus Epps, football player
- Jonathan Fahn: voice/TV/film actor, as well as an award-winning film and stage director, producer, and writer.
- Joy Fawcett, soccer player
- Eric Filia, baseball player
- Julio Gonzalez, boxer
- Tommy Grady, Former professional football player (AFL)
- Lisa Guerrero, journalist
- Kyle Higashioka, baseball player
- Donnie Hill, MLB baseball player
- Jeff Kent, former baseball player, member of Baseball Hall of Fame
- Joon Lee, Korean American rapper, one-third of South Korean hip-hop trio Solid. Introduced turntablism to Korea in the mid '90s.
- Henry Owens, (MLB) baseball player
- Tori Pena, pole vaulter
- Tom Shields, Olympic swimmer
- Yevgeni Starikov, soccer player
- Dale Thayer, baseball player
- William Wang, founder of Vizio
- Nick Waterhouse, musician
- Doug Webb, musician
- Scott Weiland, Stone Temple Pilots singer
- Brandon Winokur, MLB shortstop
