= Van Tuinei =

American football player (born 1971)

No. 91, 96, 90
- Position: Defensive end

Personal information
- Born: February 16, 1971 (age 55); Garden Grove, California
- Listed height: 6 ft 4 in (1.93 m)
- Listed weight: 290 lb (132 kg)

Career information
- High school: Westminster (Westminster, California)
- College: Arizona
- NFL draft: 1997: undrafted

Career history
- San Diego Chargers (1997); Indianapolis Colts (1998); Chicago Bears (1999–2000); Indiana Firebirds (2003–2004)

Career NFL statistics
- Games played - started: 45 - 10
- Tackles: 44
- Sacks: 5.5
- Stats at Pro Football Reference

Vaega Van Tuinei (born February 16, 1971, in Garden Grove, California) is an American former professional football player who was a defensive end in the National Football League (NFL).

Tuinei attended Westminster High School in Westminster, California and played collegiate football at the University of Arizona.

Tuinei signed with the San Diego Chargers in 1997 as an undrafted free agent. His four-year career also included stints with the Indianapolis Colts, and Chicago Bears.

His son, Lavasier Tuinei, played in the Canadian Football League.
