= Fountain Valley High School =

Location
- 17816 Bushard Street; Fountain Valley, California 92708; United States; 33.70441°N 117.96217°W

Information
- Type: Public high school
- Established: 1966; 60 years ago
- School district: Huntington Beach Union High School District
- Principal: Casey Harelson
- Teaching staff: 119.69 (FTE)
- Grades: 9–12
- Enrollment: 3,130 (2023–2024)
- Student to teacher ratio: 26.15
- Campus: Suburban
- Colors: Gold, blue and red
- Athletics conference: CIF Southern Section; Sunset League
- Team name: Barons
- Rival: Edison Chargers
- Newspaper: Baron Banner
- Yearbook: Raconteur
- Website: fvhs.com

Fountain Valley High School (FVHS) is a public high school in Fountain Valley, California. It is a part of the Huntington Beach Union High School District.

== History ==
Fountain Valley was established in 1966. It is notable for its rivalry with Edison High School, particularly during the American football season when both schools compete in the "Battle of the Bell".

For the first few years after opening, the school had a larger student population than any other high school west of the Mississippi with approximately 4,300 students. Due to the large student body, school days were split into two shifts, mornings for underclassmen and afternoons for upperclassmen. Over the years, enrollment decreased due to various factors, including the opening of Edison High School in 1969.

The athletic teams are known as the Barons and the school colors are red, blue and gold. The school had to renovate some of its buildings, which were sinking, starting in 2002. These renovations yielded new portable buildings in an area that was previously a parking lot. In 2006, these semi-permanent portable buildings were replaced with permanent facilities. In March 2011, the track and football field were renovated. The dirt track was replaced by a synthetic track and the field was replaced with new natural grass. The field has since been replaced by imitation grass and turf.

The school's marching band, called the "Royal Regiment", represented California at Ronald Reagan's 1981 inaugural parade. "When Johnny Comes Marching Home" was played by the marching band as hostages were released from the American embassy in Tehran.

In fall 1996, a scene from the 1997 film Wag the Dog was filmed at FVHS during a basketball game and used the 1997 graduating class as extras.

In March 2005, the school drumline and band was filmed in Gwen Stefani's "Hollaback Girl" music video.

In April 2007, the school was recognized as a California Distinguished School for the second consecutive time.

The school is known for its vocal music program including the advanced choir, called the "Troubadours", which has performed at conferences and conventions.

== Academics ==
=== Advanced placement ===
Fountain Valley High School has an Advanced Placement (or AP) program which allows high school students to study college-level course work. A wide range of AP courses in every subject area are offered at the school.

== Athletics ==
The school currently competes in the Sunset League and is a part of the California Interscholastic Federation Southern Section (CIF). Before 1974, the school competed in the Irvine League. The school fields all of the following sports: boys' baseball, basketball, cross country running, American football, golf, soccer, swim, tennis, track and field, volleyball, water polo and wrestling. On the girls' side, Fountain Valley fields the sports of basketball, cross country, field hockey, golf, soccer, softball, swimming, tennis, track and field, volleyball and water polo. The school previously had a badminton team that was removed sometime until being reintroduced in 2018. In the past, FVHS had a gymnastics team.

Fountain Valley lacks a stadium of its own, so it uses Huntington Beach, Westminster, or Orange Coast College’s stadium.

The school also holds Five Counties Wrestling Championships, which is one of the biggest tournaments in the US. They are also ranked #1 in Orange County and #7 in the state of California.

The American football game against rival Edison High School on December 11, 1980, was the fourth-highest attended game in state history with 28,968 fans in attendance. It was held at Anaheim Stadium, now known as Angel Stadium.

== Notable alumni ==
- Carter Bryant (basketball), NBA Player
- Tony Palacios, guitarist for Guardian and Michael W. Smith, voted #3 Greatest Christian Rock Guitarist of All Time, Front of House Engineer for Danny Gokey
- Summer Altice, actress and model
- Nicholas Arciniaga, 2013 USA marathon champion
- Shirley Babashoff, 1975, competition swimmer, Olympic champion
- Tara Lynne Barr, 2011, actress
- Craig Brewer, 1990, film director, producer, screenwriter
- Blake Davis, 2002, former Major League Baseball infielder for the Baltimore Orioles
- David Denman, actor
- K. J. Gerard, NFL player
- Peter Girguis, 1971, professor at Harvard University in the Department of Organismic and Evolutionary Biology
- Kim Gruenenfelder, writer
- Emile Harry, 1981, former Kansas City Chiefs (1986–1992), Los Angeles Rams (1992), and off-season squad memberAtlanta Falcons (1985) and Denver Broncos (1993)
- Luke Hudson, 1995, former Major League Baseball pitcher for the Cincinnati Reds and the Kansas City Royals
- Casey Janssen, 2000, former Major League Baseball pitcher for the Toronto Blue Jays and the Washington Nationals
- John Kosty, NCAA men's volleyball coach
- Duvall Love, 1981, former Los Angeles Rams (1985–1991), Pittsburgh Steelers (1992–1994), Arizona Cardinals (1995–1996)
- Ken Margerum, 1977, NFL wide receiver, college football coach. First Team All-America (Stanford), College Football Hall of Fame
- Michelle Pfeiffer, 1976, actress
- Chris Tillman, 2006, former Major League Baseball pitcher for the Baltimore Orioles
- Jasmine Tookes, model
- Lilia Vu, professional golfer
- C.J. Wilson, 1998, former Major League Baseball pitcher for the Texas Rangers (baseball) and the Los Angeles Angels

== Former principals ==
List of principals:

- Paul Berger – 1966–1979 (founding principal)
- Larry Lucas – 1979–1980
- David Hagen – 1980–1985
- Mike Kasler – 1985–1991
- Gary Ernst – 1991–2000
- Connie Mayhugh – 2000–2004
- Chris Herzfeld – 2004–2014
- Kirk Kennedy – 2014–2015
- Morgan Smith – 2015–2021
- Paul Lopez – 2021–2026
- Casey Harelson – 2026–present
