= Henry Owens (left-handed pitcher) =

American baseball player (born 1992)

- Pitcher
- Born: July 21, 1992 (age 34); Orange, California, U.S.
- Batted: Left Threw: Left

MLB debut
- August 4, 2015, for the Boston Red Sox

Last MLB appearance
- September 29, 2016, for the Boston Red Sox

MLB statistics
- Win–loss record: 4–6
- Earned run average: 5.19
- Strikeouts: 71
- Stats at Baseball Reference

Teams
- Boston Red Sox (2015–2016)

Henry Cole Owens (born July 21, 1992) is an American former professional baseball pitcher. He played in Major League Baseball (MLB) for the Boston Red Sox.

== Amateur career ==
Owens attended Edison High School in Huntington Beach, California. He earned the Cal-Hi Sports Mr. Baseball State Player of the Year Award in 2011, after posting a 12–1 record with a 1.15 earned run average (ERA) and three saves, while striking out 140 batters in 91 2/3 innings of work. He also was named a 2011 Louisville Slugger High School All-American and earned 2011 Sunset League Pitcher of the Year honors for the two consecutive years.

== Professional career ==
=== Boston Red Sox ===
The Boston Red Sox selected Owens in the first round (36th overall) of the 2011 MLB draft. He signed with them on August 15, 2011 for a $1.5 million signing bonus. Owens made his professional debut in 2012 with the Greenville Drive of the Class A South Atlantic League (SAL), sporting a 12–5 record and a 4.87 ERA in 23 games, including 130 strikeouts and 47 walks in 101 2/3 innings. In addition, he finished fourth in the SAL for the most strikeouts, while tying for fourth in wins.

Entering 2013, Owens was ranked as the eighth best prospect in the Red Sox organization and ranked 77th in the MLB.com Top 100 Prospects list. He promoted to the Salem Red Sox of the Class A-Advanced Carolina League on April 2. On July 17, he struck out a season-high tying 10 in six innings, while combining with two other pitchers to deliver the first no-hitter in franchise history in a 6–0 win over the Frederick Keys. Overall, he posted an 8–5 record and a 2.92 ERA over 20 starts for Salem, including a hitless streak of 19 1/3 innings, gaining a promotion to the Portland Sea Dogs of the Class AA Eastern League on August 1.

With the Sea Dogs, Owens went 3–1 with a 1.78 ERA, striking out 46 in just 30 1/3 innings over six starts. He was a Carolina League Mid-Season All-Star, as well as SoxProspects.com's 2013 Pitcher of the Year. Additionally, he made the Baseball America Minor League All-Star Team. Owens started the 2014 season by pitching a rain-shortened six-inning no-hitter for the Sea Dogs. Making 20 starts in Portland, Owens compiled a record of 14–4 with 3 complete games in 121 innings, with 126 strikeouts and an earned run average of 2.60. He was promoted to the Pawtucket Red Sox of the Class AAA International League on August 2, 2014. He was a mid-season and post-season All-Star with Portland as well as Eastern League Pitcher of the Year. Owens was invited to Spring Training with the Red Sox in 2015 but began the season with Pawtucket. He was 3–8 with a 3.16 ERA in 21 AAA starts.

The Red Sox promoted Owens to the major leagues on August 4. He made his debut by striking out the first batter he faced in the game, Jacoby Ellsbury. and went on to allow three runs in five innings to take the loss against the New York Yankees. He collected his first MLB win in his second start on August 9 against the Detroit Tigers at Comerica Park, allowing one run through five innings. He made 11 starts in 2015, with a 4–4 record and 4.57 ERA. He spent most of the 2016 season with Pawtucket, where he was 10–7 with a 3.92 ERA in 24 starts but he also made five starts for the Red Sox in the majors, and was 0–2 with a 6.95 ERA in those appearances.

In 2017, Owens battled with his command and spent the entire season in the minors, split between Pawtucket (14 starts) and Portland (12 starts) and was a combined 7–11 with a 4.21 ERA. Owens was removed from the Red Sox 40-man roster on December 5, 2017 and placed on waivers.

=== Arizona Diamondbacks ===
On December 8, 2017, Owens was claimed off waivers by the Arizona Diamondbacks

=== Los Angeles Dodgers ===
On December 22, he was claimed again, this time by the Los Angeles Dodgers. Owens was designated for assignment on May 18, 2018, after having spent the first two months of the season on the minor league disabled list. He was released that same day.

=== Arizona Diamondbacks (second stint) ===
On May 24, 2018, Owens signed a minor league deal with the Arizona Diamondbacks. He was released by the organization on March 25, 2019.

=== Kansas City T-Bones ===
On June 11, 2019, Owens signed with the Kansas City T-Bones of the independent American Association. In 21 games (7 starts) 55.2 innings he went 4-2 with a 4.69 ERA with 72 strikeouts and 2 saves.

=== Sugar Land Skeeters ===
On March 16, 2020, Owens was traded to the Sugar Land Skeeters of the Atlantic League of Professional Baseball in exchange for Chuck Taylor. In July 2020, Owens signed on to play for the Sugar Land Lightning Sloths of the Constellation Energy League (a makeshift 4-team independent league created as a result of the COVID-19 pandemic) for the 2020 season. In 3 games 3.2 innings of relief he went 0-0 with an ugly 22.09 ERA with more walks (9) than strikeouts (6).

=== Lexington Legends ===
On February 26, 2021, Owens signed with the Lexington Legends of the Atlantic League of Professional Baseball. He became a free agent following the season. In 25 games (18 starts) 92 innings he struggled mightily going 4-5 with a 6.55 ERA with 113 strikeouts.

On March 3, 2022, Owens re-signed with the Legends for the 2022 season. He was released on September 1. In 35 games 46.2 innings of relief he struggled immensely going 1-3 with a 7.33 ERA with 42 strikeouts.

=== Retirement ===
In November 2022, Owens was hired by BaseballCloud as an intern, and ended his playing career.

== Pitching style ==
Owens's pitching arsenal features an 88–91 miles per hour (142–146 km/h) fastball and a 76–79 miles per hour (122–127 km/h) changeup, which he combines with a slow curveball (68–73 miles per hour (109–117 km/h)) and an occasional slider.
