= Westminster High School (California) =

Location
- 14325 Goldenwest Street; Westminster, California 92683; United States; 33.75397°N 118.00771°W

Information
- Type: Public high school
- Motto: "One Family, One Pride."
- Established: September 10, 1959
- School district: Huntington Beach Union High School District
- Principal: Amy Sabol
- Teaching staff: 107.59 (FTE)
- Grades: 9-12
- Student to teacher ratio: 23.64
- Colors: Red, black and white
- Athletics conference: CIF Southern Section; Golden West League
- Mascot: Leo
- Nickname: Lions
- Website: http://www.whslions.net

Westminster High School is a public high school located in Westminster, California. It is part of the Huntington Beach Union High School District. It is currently the only school within the Huntington Beach Union High School District to have a working farm as well as the largest school in Orange County. Westminster High School has a rivalry against Ocean View High School.

== Overview ==
The school's name and traditions are derived from Westminster Abbey in London, England. The school colors of red, black and white are those of the Queen's Guard, and the school's mascot, Leo the lion, is a national animal of England. The student government, called the House of Lords, also represents the government of England. Each ASB member serves under a minister position while the board of ASB serves under specific names representing that of England's government. The ASB president is referred to as the Prime Minister, ASB Vice President to Chancellor, Secretary to Minister of Records, and Treasurer to Exchequer.

The school opened on September 10, 1959 following population growth associated with the incorporation of Westminster in 1957. It covers approximately 57.1 acres (231,000 m^{2}), including 5 acres (20,000 m^{2}) of working farm land and is the largest school in Orange County. The school serves students from Johnson Middle School, Warner Middle School, and Stacey Middle School. In 2002 the school completed its construction and was the first school in the Orange County area that has an elevator to serve handicapped students for their two-story building located on the North side of campus. The new stadium features a professional level football and soccer field along with a nine-lane polyurethane track and bleachers that hold 5,500 fans.

== Demographics ==
As of June 2026:

White	Latino	Asian	African American	Pacific Islander	American Indian	Two or More Races
3.4%	49.6%	43.8%	0.8%	0.3%	0.2%	1.7%

According to U.S. News & World Report, 96% of Westminster's student body is "of color," with 87% of the student body coming from an economically disadvantaged household, determined by student eligibility for California's Reduced-price meal program.

== Sports ==
Westminster High School athletes compete in the Golden West League of CIF's Southern Section.

Westminster Academic Decathlon team won 1st place in Division 3 State Competition in 2016.

Westminster Academic Decathlon team won 1st place in Division 2 State Competition in 2017.

Westminster Academic Decathlon team won 1st place in the Regionals Super Quiz in 2011 and 2018.

== Notable alumni ==
- Mark Eaton, former NBA All-Star player with the Utah Jazz for 12 seasons.
- Ryan Klesko, former MLB Player for 13 years with the Braves, Padres and Giants.
- Debbie Green-Vargas, Olympic volleyball player.
- Penelope Spheeris, American director, producer, and screenwriter of SNL, Roseanne and Wayne's World.
- Nguyen Cao Ky Duyen, co-host of Thuy Nga's Paris By Night.
- Richard Brown, Former NFL Player with the Rams, Chargers, Browns and Vikings.
- Van Tuinei, NFL career with the Chargers, Colts and Bears.
- Mick Mars (Robert Deal), former lead guitarist and co-founder of Mötley Crüe.
- Carlos Palomino, World Welterweight Champ '77 - '79.
- Greg Mahle, MLB, player for the Los Angeles Angels.
- Tyler Mahle, MLB, player for the Atlanta Braves.
- Eddie Bane MLB, player for the Minnesota Twins.
- Bill Tiller, American computer game designer, writer, and artist.
- Randy Kraft, convicted rapist and serial killer.
