= Huntington Beach Union High School District =

School district in California

Address
- 5832 Bolsa Avenue Huntington Beach, California, 92649; United States

District information
- Type: Public
- Grades: 9–12
- Established: 1903
- Superintendent: Carolee Ogata
- Accreditation: Western Association of Schools and Colleges
- NCES District ID: 0618060

Students and staff
- Students: 13,976 (2020–2021)
- Teachers: 629.89 (FTE)
- Staff: 504.35 (FTE)
- Student–teacher ratio: 24.66:1

Other information
- Website: www.hbuhsd.edu

The Huntington Beach Union High School District (HBUHSD) is a public school district serving portions of the Orange County cities of Huntington Beach, Fountain Valley, Garden Grove and Westminster.

It oversees eight sites, offering courses for students in grades 9–12. The union high school district also offers courses through an affiliated adult school. Its superintendent since September 2024 is Dr. Carolee Ogata.

== Board of trustees ==
=== Current trustees ===
- Trustee Diana Carey (2018–present)
- Trustee Bonnie Castrey (1985–present)
- Trustee Duane Dishno (2012–present)
- Trustee Susan Henry (2000–present)
- Trustee Christine Hernandez (2024–present)

=== Former trustees ===
- Former Trustee Michael Simons (1991-2024)
- Former Trustee Kathleen Iverson (2010–2018)
- Former Trustee Brian Garland (2002-2012)
- Former Trustee Matthew Harper (1998-2010)
- Former Trustee Sallie Dashiell (1998-2002)
- Former Trustee Bonnie Bruce (1990-2000)

== List of schools ==
=== High schools ===
- Edison High School
- Fountain Valley High School
- Huntington Beach High School
- Marina High School
- Ocean View High School
- Westminster High School

=== Alternative education schools ===
- Valley Vista High School (Continuation high school)
- Coast High School (Independent Study)
- Huntington Beach Adult School (Adult Education)

== Feeder districts ==
- Fountain Valley School District
- Huntington Beach City School District
- Ocean View School District
- Westminster School District

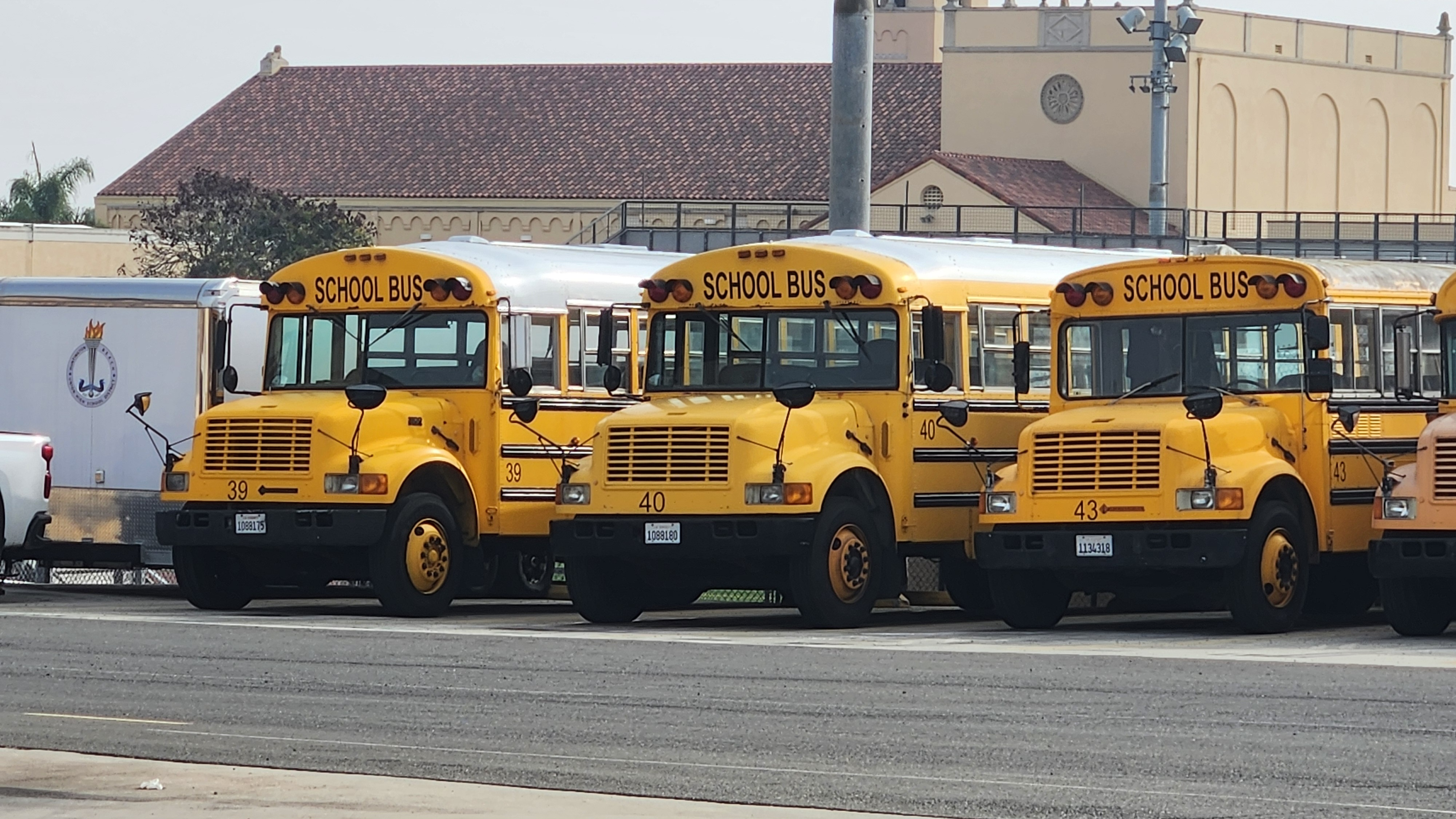
A few school buses owned by Huntington Beach Union High School District.
