= Pretend City Children's Museum =

Coordinates: 33.6421°N 117.7395°W

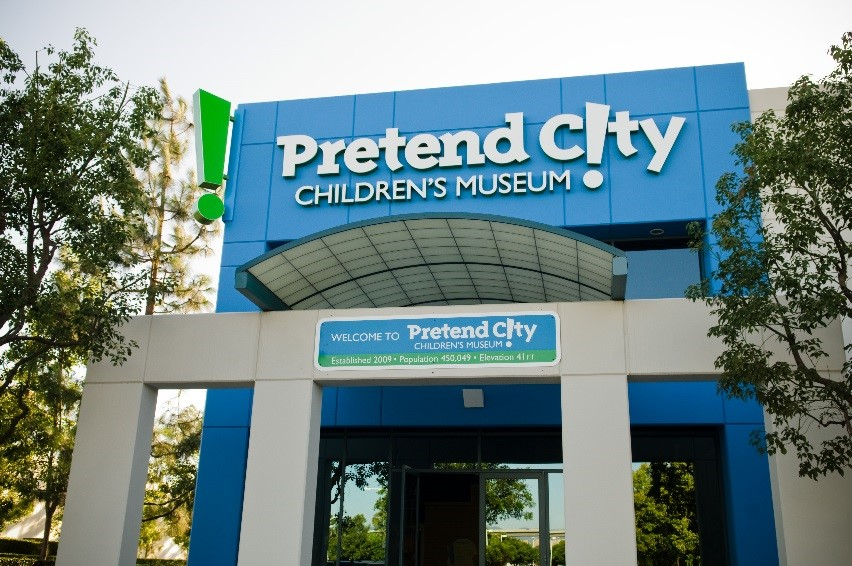
- Established: 2009
- Location: 29 Hubble, Irvine, California, U.S.
- Type: Children's Museum
- Website: www.PretendCity.org

Pretend City Children’s Museum is a nonprofit children’s museum located in Irvine, California. The museum encompasses 17 interactive learning spaces that simulate a small interconnected city. In addition to its learning spaces, the museum provides community resources such as developmental screenings and tools for families, educators, and community agencies.

== History ==
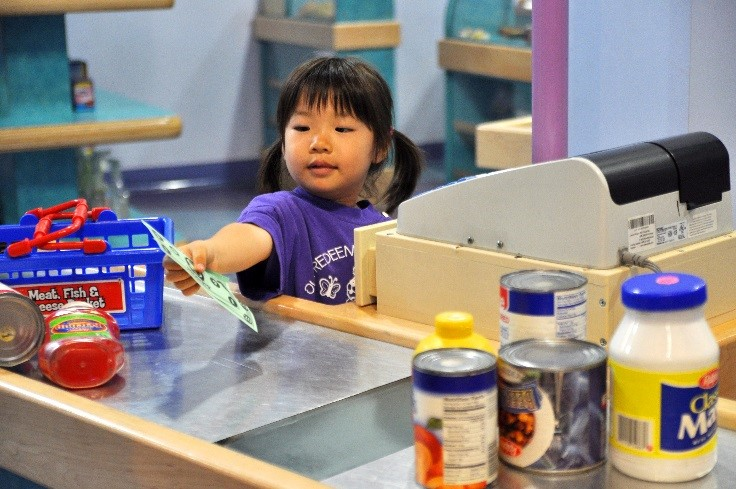
Girl hands out change at the Grocery Store

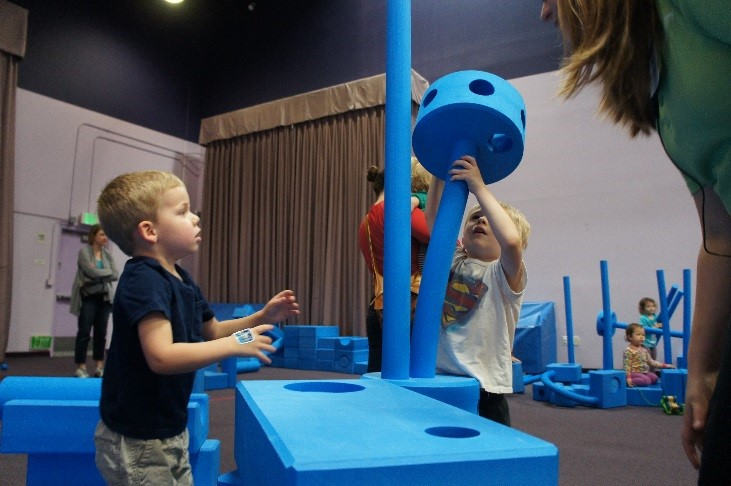
Kids working together to build at the Imagination Playground

The Pretend City Children's Museum, established by Alexandra Airth and Sandra Peffer, began its journey with the launch of its first educational program, “Pretend City on Wheels,” in 2007. This mobile field trip experience aimed to engage children in learning through play. In July 2009, the museum initiated a decade-long countywide program focused on raising awareness among the community, parents, and caregivers about the significance of regular developmental screenings for children, particularly those from infancy to age five. In November 2010, the museum received “The Possible Dream” grant from The Festival of Children Foundation and OC Register. This funding supported autism-related programs, allowing Pretend City to host bi-monthly events for families affected by autism, including creative relaxation classes and workshops.

After implementing safety measures during the COVID-19 pandemic, Pretend City successfully reopened in 2021, continuing its mission to provide educational resources and engaging experiences for children and families.

== Learning Spaces and Special Programs ==
Pretend City’s kid-sized environment contains learning spaces modeled after a city and designed by David Rockwell. In addition to its exhibits, the location also offers educational field trips and classes.

Learning Spaces include: an Amphitheater, Art Studio, Mind + Body Center, Sandy Beach, Restaurant Café, City Hall and Lobby, Construction Site, Emergency Services with Dispatch Station, Police Station, Fire Station, Farm, Gas Station, Trader Joe's Grocery Store, Health Center with Doctor’s and Dental Office, Marina, Orange Plaza, Our Home, UPS Store, and Imagination Playground.
