= Golden West League =

The Golden West League is a high school athletic league that is part of the CIF Southern Section. Member schools are public schools in Orange County. The league began play in 1994.

== Member schools ==
- Buena Park High School
- Calvary Chapel High School (Santa Ana, California)
- Costa Mesa High School
- Fullerton High School
- Garden Grove High School
- Godinez Fundamental High School
- Katella High School
- Kennedy High School
- Laguna Hills High School
- Ocean View High School
- Santa Ana High School
- Segerstrom High School
- Tustin High School
- Valencia High School
- Westminster High School
