= Jim Usevitch =

American basketball player

Personal information
- Born: April 21, 1964 (age 62) Huntington Beach, California, U.S.
- Listed height: 6 ft 9 in (2.06 m)
- Listed weight: 235 lb (107 kg)

Career information
- High school: Ocean View (Huntington Beach, California)
- College: BYU (1982–1984, 1986–1988)
- NBA draft: 1988: undrafted
- Playing career: 1988–1995
- Position: Power forward / center

Career history
- 1988–1989: Hapoel Haifa
- 1989–1990: AEK Athens
- 1991–1992: Tri-City Chinook
- 1992: B. Sardegna Sassari
- 1993–1994: Hapoel Givatayim
- 1994–1995: Brussels

James Scott Usevitch (born April 21, 1964, in Huntington Beach, California) is an American former professional basketball player.

A 6'9" center, Usevitch averaged 21 points and 14 rebounds per game as a senior at Ocean View High School (California) in 1981–82. He then played at Brigham Young University from 1982 to 1988, and was an All-WAC honorable mention in his final season after posting averages of 14.8 points and 7.2 rebounds. He also tallied a team-high 41 blocks that year. Usevitch's college career was interrupted for two seasons while he served as a Mormon missionary in New Zealand.

After college, Usevitch competed professionally in Europe, Israel, Greece and the CBA. In October 1991, Usevitch tried out for the Los Angeles Clippers of the NBA, but he was released by the team before the regular season began.
