= Midway City, California =

- Unincorporated community Census-designated place
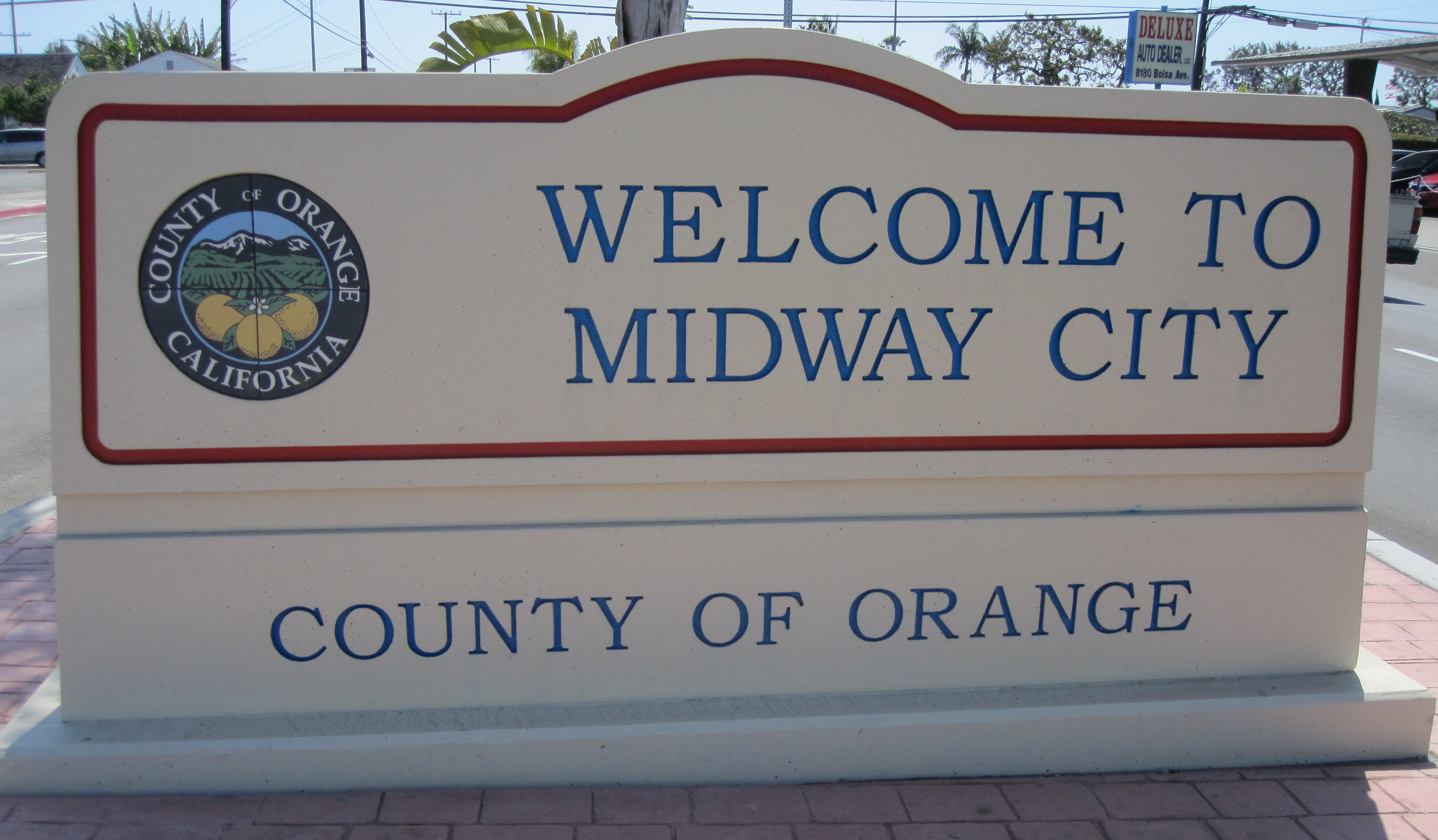

- Location within Greater Los Angeles Location in California Location in the United States
- Coordinates: 33°44′41″N 117°59′13″W
- Country: United States
- State: California
- County: Orange

Area
  - Total: 0.610 sq mi (1.579 km^{2})
  - Land: 0.610 sq mi (1.579 km^{2})
  - Water: 0 sq mi (0 km^{2}) 0%
- Elevation: 43 ft (13 m)

Population (2020)
  - Total: 8,825
  - Density: 14,480/sq mi (5,589/km^{2})
- Time zone: UTC-8 (Pacific (PST))
  - Summer (DST): UTC-7 (PDT)
- ZIP Code: 92655
- Area codes: 657 and 714
- GNIS feature ID: 2583081

Midway City is an unincorporated community and census-designated place (CDP) that forms part of the county land controlled by Orange County, California. The only area in Orange County that incorporates its chamber of commerce and homeowners association to act in concert like a city council, the area mostly is surrounded by Westminster with Huntington Beach bordering it on the southwest. Midway City was so named because it is horizontally midway between Seal Beach, to the west, and Santa Ana, to the east. The 2020 census listed the population as 8,825.

Midway City is one of Orange County's oldest communities, and many of its homes are of 1950s construction. The area includes two mobile home parks and the residents who live here are of moderate income, with many of them senior citizens. As described by Midway City local historian in 2008, "Midway City is desirable because of its large lots – typically over 8,000 square feet with many larger lots as well.... The trend is that buyers are scraping the lots and building big homes or adding large additions onto the original home." The community fits within a 1.3 square miles (3.4 km^{2}) area and takes up 0.632 square miles (1.64 km^{2}) of land.

Being an unincorporated county area, municipal annexation by cities bordering Midway City is an ongoing issue for Midway City. Attempts at complete annexation have met fierce resistance from Midway's residents, who would rather have their community remain an unincorporated area of Orange County to maintain water and property tax rates that are lower than neighboring communities.

However, Midway City's land adjacent to its borders has slowly been annexed by Westminster over time, particularly for public schools sites, to transfer decision making and government school funds from the county to the city. Annexation has also occurred along the heavily traveled Beach Boulevard/California State Route 39, where that annexed land could be redeveloped to generate significant business tax revenue for Westminster. As a result, Midway City presently is composed of four anemic sections, or "islands", that have stepped boundaries which include mostly residential property, small businesses, and not-for-profit businesses such as churches, American Legion Post 555, and the Brothers of Saint Patrick order.

== History ==
=== 1880s to 1930s ===
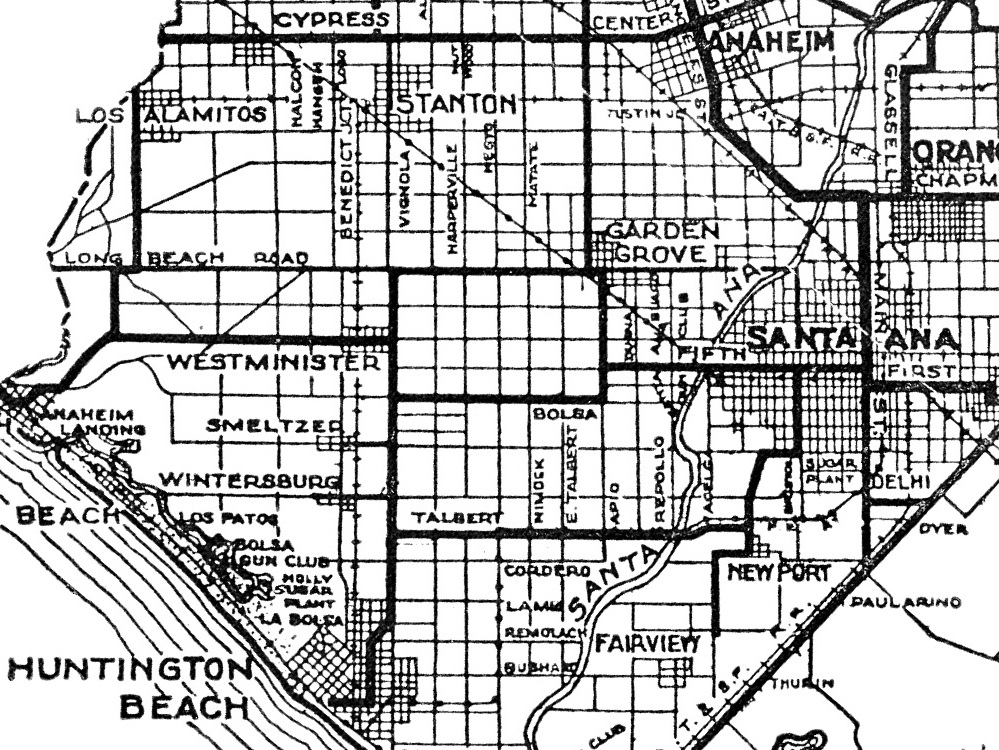
1921 map including Midway City area with Bolsa Avenue labeled and intersecting to the left the unidentified Beach Boulevard (then called "Huntington Beach Boulevard"), shown as a thick black line

Two miles directly to the east of Midway City was the now-defunct Town of Bolsa, which was established in 1870. Midway City's northernmost boundary, Hazard Avenue, is named after the great-grandparents of Clyde Hazard: early American pioneers Robert Samuel and Betsy Ann (née White) Hazard, who moved from Hitchcock County, Nebraska with their children to the Westminster district in August 1881 and subsequently purchased forty acres northwest of the Town of Bolsa on February 6, 1882. Ann was a direct descendant of the White family, who, in 1620, sailed from England to Plymouth, Massachusetts on the Mayflower. In 1891, Midway City received its post office from Bolsa. In 1915, one of the top United States poultry judges, W. M. Wise, moved from Michigan to perform breeding and service work for Pacific Southwest Poultry Farm in Midway City. Seven years later, Midway City began to take shape in 1922 when John H. Harper purchased 200 acres (0.81 km^{2}) of land based on the location of a local stagecoach stop and needs of the workers in the Huntington Beach Oil Field located west of the stagecoach stop. Harper subsequently subdivided his land by laying out streets, building sidewalks, and, in 1923, started selling lots. As the Huntington Beach Oil Field expanded, the homes in that area that stood in the path of drawing oil from the ground were physically relocated to Harper's lots in Midway City, which "started Midway City." The area, which currently includes four unincorporated, "anemic" sections as a result of annexation for the Westminster business district, is known as Midway City; the largest section looks like a crooked letter "P". Midway City is six miles from Santa Ana, six miles from Huntington Beach, and seven miles from Long Beach, giving rise to the Midway City name. Harper Street, which vertically bisects the largest of the four Midway City sections, is named after John Harper.

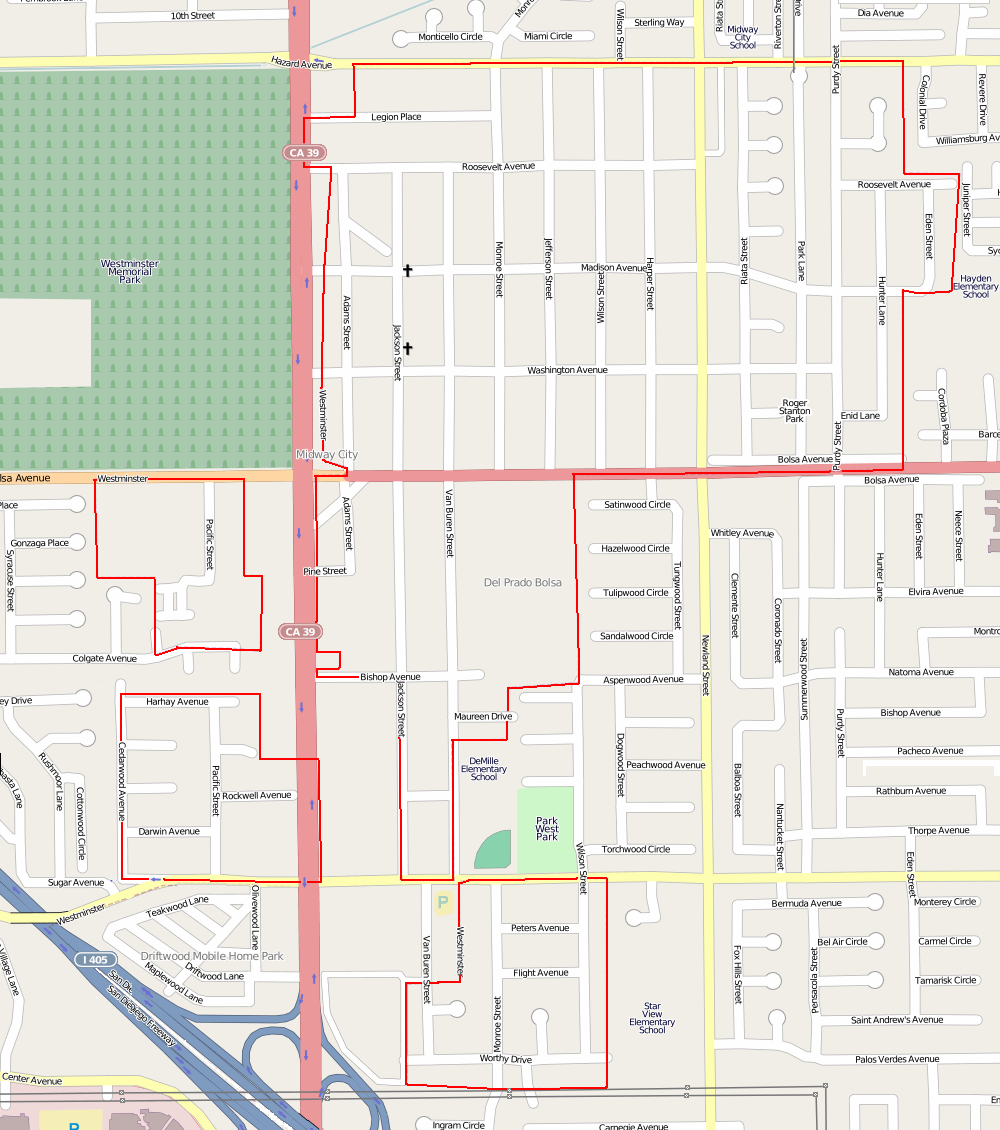
The four sections that make up unincorporated Midway City.

Prior to 1927, Zenith Corporation manufactured farm implements in Midway City. After learning of American aviator Charles Lindbergh's famed May 20–21, 1927 first solo transatlantic flight via non-stop fixed-wing aircraft flight between America and mainland Europe, Zenith Corporation owners Charles Rocheville and Albin Peterson formed the Zenith Aircraft Corporation. Three months later, by August 1927, Zenith Aircraft Corporation built a huge, lightweight tri-motor aircraft named Schofield Albatross in a hangar/factory at Midway City Airport. To make its maiden flight some time in the fall of 1927, the Albatross, identified as Zenith Albatross Z-12, had an externally braced wing spanning 90-ft and a fuselage designed to carry 14 passengers and baggage at a maximum speed of 100-mph. With no market for the then-largest aircraft in the world, the Zenith Albatross Z-12 eventually was sold to Hollywood and used to represent a crashed Fokker in the 1928 film Conquest directed by filmmaker Roy Del Ruth. Zenith manufactured a second airplane, the Zenith Albatross Z-6, before the 1930s Great Depression affected the corporation and Zenith went back to manufacturing farm equipment in 1932.

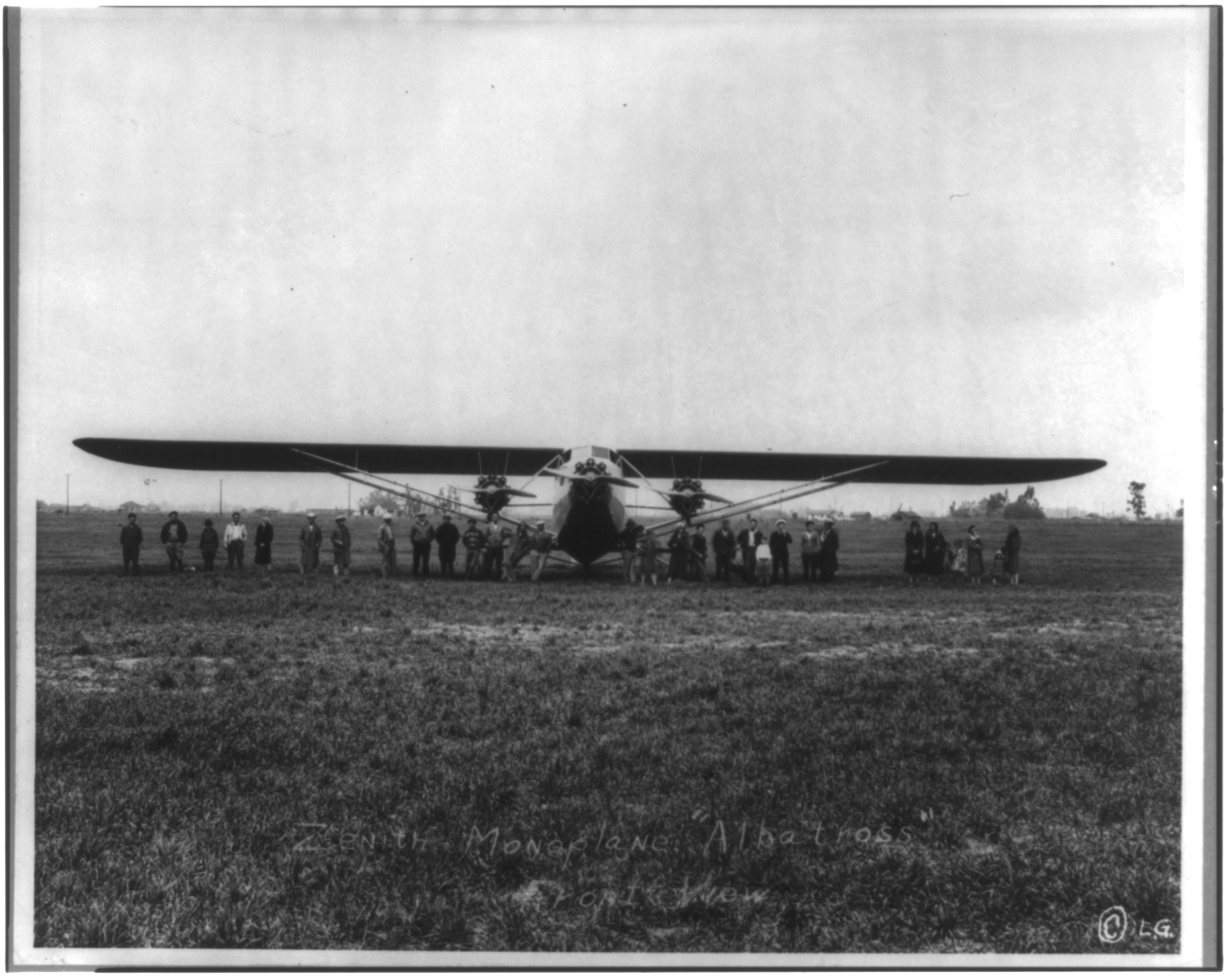
1928 view of the Zenith Albatross Z-12 with people lined up below the aircraft's wings

In 1928, American aviator Charles Lindbergh and some investors stopped off at Eddie Martin Airport looking for another airfield field in what was to become Midway City to see Zenith's Albatross. That same year, the politically powerful Ladies Social and Civic Club of Midway City built a community clubhouse at the corner of Bolsa Avenue and Monroe Street from land donated by Harper that the Chamber of Commerce and other organizations subsequently used. The proactive women's group, which originally met at John Harper's house and included Harper's wife, also worked to keep out roadhouses and landfills from the Midway City lands. The next year, 1929, the Methodist Episcopal Church's Latin American Mission outreach began holding services and marriage ceremonies in Midway City for Mexican field workers who had come to the area after the end of the Mexican Revolution. In 1932, the Ladies Social and Civic Club of Midway City renamed itself as the Midway City Women's Club. The Long Beach earthquake of March 10, 1933 had such a significant impact on Midway City that it still was a topic of interest for the residents in August 1933. Three years after renaming itself, in 1935, the club established a Midway City branch of the Orange County Public Library and joined the General Federation of Women's Clubs. The clubhouse for the Midway City Women's Club eventually was moved in 1989 to Leaora L. Blakey Park at 8612 Westminster Boulevard.

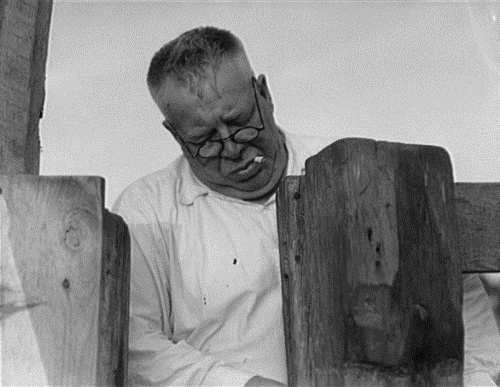
Henry Lotz in May 1937 closing the gate to the barns at the Midway City Dairy Association, which was rehabilitated with a June 1936 loan from the U.S. Resettlement Administration.

In 1936, seven families that made up the Midway City Dairy Association received a loan of $7,850 in June from the Resettlement Administration, a New Deal U.S. federal agency that, between April 1935 and December 1936, relocated struggling urban and rural families to communities planned by the federal government. The loan stood out in that it was the first loan by the Resettlement Administration to a self-help cooperative and led to other cooperatives seeking money from the Resettlement Administration. The seven families used the money to rehabilitate the Midway City Dairy Association: "The plant was immediately renovated, and better equipment procured by trade. Bidding tactics of competitors were studied with all the zeal of poker experts, means of developing consumer cooperative markets were explained, and all plans laid to take full advantage of their new capital and condition as free producers in an open market." In obtaining the loan, Henry Lotz noted, "This Resettlement loan, it's a future to us from the bidding platform for old age labor."

The 1930s also brought additional services to Midway City. The United States Postal Service opened a post office on Jackson Street in 1930. The Midway City Volunteer Fire Department was formed in 1935. The Midway City Sanitary District, which presently provides sewer and solid waste services to the residents of Midway City and others in its district, was established in January 1939 when its Governing Board held the first meeting at the Fire Hall in Midway City. The Midway City Volunteer Fire Department received a fire station in 1952—Orange County Fire Authority Station #25—and eventually became a permanent part of Division I of the Orange County Fire Authority. However, after 80 years of operation, by 2011, the Midway City Post Office was identified by the U.S. Postal Service as one of 112 California post office locations "that have not seen enough postal customers to generate the revenue necessary to keep them open." In December 2011, the U.S. Postal Service delayed the closure of Midway's post office until Congress first passed legislation to overhaul the United States Postal Service.

=== 1940s to 1980s ===
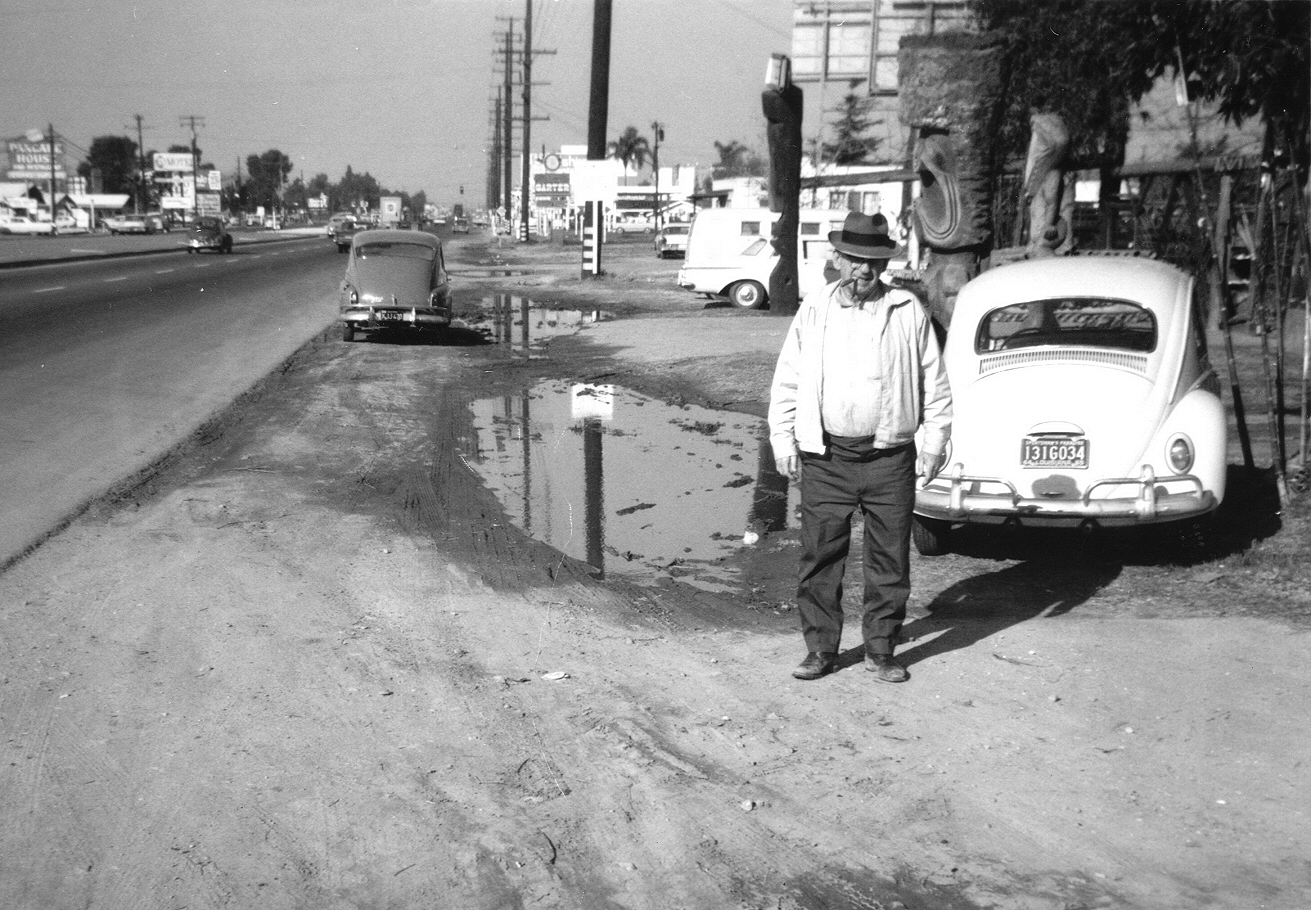
Eli Hedley's Island Trade Store on Beach Blvd in January 1965. This Midway City site later would be annexed by Westminster to develop and receive tax revenues from Elmore Toyota at 15300 Beach Boulevard.

In 1942, local landmark Midway City Feed Store open to service horse owners in the surrounding areas and also began selling rabbits, guinea pigs, baby chicks, ducklings, and goslings from its large yellow barn. Six years later in 1948, the Brothers of Saint Patrick order was established in Midway City as the United States foundation and headquarters of Patrician Brothers, an Ireland-based Roman Catholic congregation for the religious and literary education of youth and the instruction of the faithful in Christian piety. The brothers work extended in the Diocese of Orange County and Roman Catholic Archdiocese of Los Angeles. They also began a celebration tradition that has become one of Orange County's biggest St. Patrick's Day celebrations. At the end of the decade, in 1949, Dick Riedel and Midway City's Bill Barris of Fullerton Air Service, sponsored by the Fullerton Chamber of Commerce, set a world flight endurance record from Fullerton Municipal Airport, keeping their modified Aeronca Sedan, the Sunkist Lady aloft for 1,008 hours and 2 minutes. Seven years later in 1956, the city of Westminster sought to incorporate Midway City, Barber City, and Westminster into a new city called Tri-City. Prior to the March 1957 creation date of Tri-City, California, Midway City had dropped out, citing fears of high taxes. In September 1957, voters in the former Westminster and Baraber City areas voted to change the name Tri-City to Westminster.

In 1981, the Orange County Local Agency Formation Commission, a government agency that makes decisions regarding boundaries for cities and unincorporated territory (land not located within a city) within Orange County, California, added Midway City to the Westminster sphere of influence, a commission method to designate future boundaries and service areas of Westminster. The commission's addition of Midway City to the Westminster sphere of influence was a political move towards Westminster's annexation of the unincorporated Midway City and to prevent Huntington Beach from being able to annex one of the last commercially valuable strips of Midway City along Beach Boulevard. After Midway's Chamber of Commerce protested, Midway was removed from Westminster's sphere. In 1986, Orange County used money from the United States Department of Housing and Urban Development to purchase about five acres of land from Southern California Edison and develop part of the land as Midway Meadows, a Midway City project consisting of 92-one bedroom apartment units for senior citizens. In 1987, the county built a park on the 1986 acquired Southern California Edison land. Three years later in 1989, the county added Midway City back in Westminster's sphere and renamed the 1987 built park Stanton Park, after Roger R. Stanton, a supervisor on the Orange County Board of Supervisors. Later that same year, the county selected Midway City's Interval House, a shelter for abused women, to receive part of a $1-million grant for expansion.

=== 1990s to present ===
Celtic Gold Academy of Irish Dance was founded at Brother's of St. Patrick in 1990. In March 1993, Orange County Supervisor Don Roth admitted to violating California state ethics laws, agreed to pay $50,000 in fines, and do 200 hours of community service work in connection with his 1990–1992 role in overruling a 1990 Orange County Planning Commission decision and approving a $5-million condominium project on land in Midway City. In 1994, the Ocean View School District banned the game POGs, a game played with decorated milk caps known as POGs, from Midway City and other elementary and middle school campuses, asserting that POGs was akin to gambling. The Brothers of St. Patrick Division of the Ancient Order of Hibernians in America was established at Brother's of St. Patrick in 1995. Three years later in 1998, freed Nigerian political prisoner Beko Ransome-Kuti spoke at Midway City's the Brother's of St. Patrick's to thank residents of Midway City who joined a letter-writing and Shell Oil boycott campaign on his behalf. In September 1999, workers repairing broken water lines in the Midway City 15000 block of Cedarwood Avenue (33°44′14″N 117°59′36″W) dug up a 500-year-old human skull and teeth, and seashells when they reached about three feet down.

In 2001, American Legion Post 555 in Midway City renamed itself the Albert E. Schwab American Legion Post after Private First Class Albert Earnest Schwab (July 17, 1920 – May 7, 1945), the brother of a Legion Post 555 member and a United States Marine who was posthumously awarded the United States' highest military honor — the Medal of Honor — for his heroic actions during the Battle of Okinawa. That same year, Midway City resident Ruben Hipolito attained the rank of Eagle Scout at age 12, which the national Boy Scouts of America office in Irving, Texas identified as a rare event. Eight years after attaining the rank of Eagle Scout, Hipolito was selected in 2009 from among 3.5 million scouts nationwide as one of six scouts to represent the Boy Scouts of America organization before the U.S. president and Congress. Hipolito later receive a special commendation from the mayor of the City of Huntington Beach for representing the city on the trip to Washington, D.C. to meet with President Barack Obama.

In January 2003, H.O.M.E.S., Inc. opened Midway City's Jackson Aisle Apartments, a 29 unit, $2.8 million apartment complex that provides affordable housing to low income individuals who additionally are mentally ill. H.O.M.E.S. selected Midway City for its housing complex site because the area is county owned, which made it easier to buy property than had they selected an area incorporated into a city. By agreement, Jackson Aisle Apartments is to remain affordable housing through 2058. About four years later in July 2007, the 1989 inclusion of Midway City in the Westminster sphere of influence was reaffirmed and the 1989 inclusion was deemed to date back to 1981. Eight months later, noting how Westminster received no payment from Midway City for the nearly 500 Midway City matters handled by Westminster police, Tami Piscotty, Westminster city economic development manager stated how it would help Westminster significantly if Midway City were part of Westminster, but also notes, "We're not going to take them against their will."

In January 2010, Orange County supervisors approve a $350,000 memorial dedicated to Vietnamese and American history to installed in Roger Stanton Park in Midway City. The memorial was to feature U.S. history and important events in the history of the Vietnamese American community. Critics felt that "plaques in a wall" did not justify spending so much money.

== Geography ==
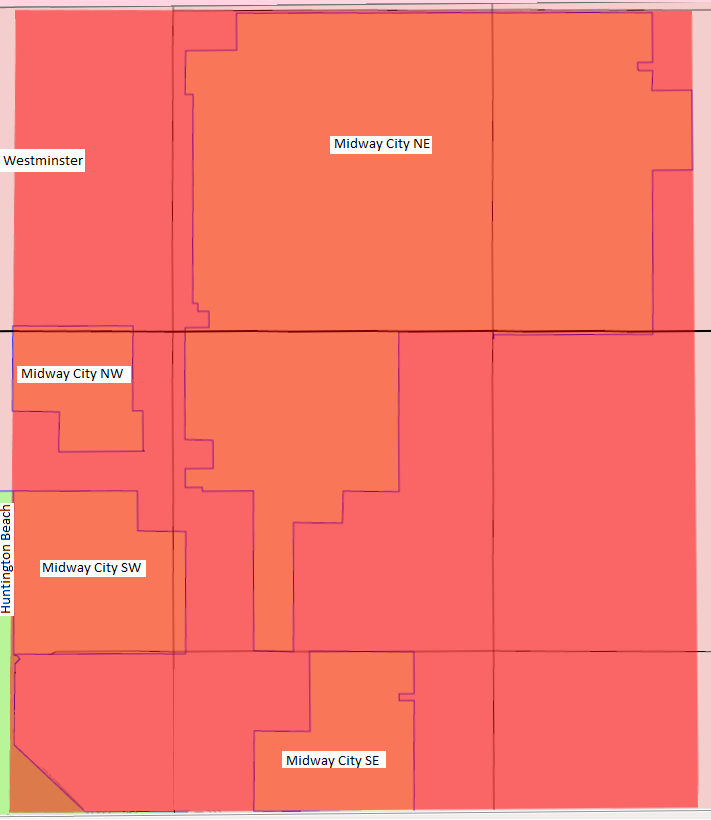
The approximately 390 acres of Midway City occupy approximately 47% of an 830-acre rectangular boundary

Midway City is located at 33°44′41″N 117°59′13″W (33.7447, −117.987). Under the United States Census Bureau's most recent survey, the area had a total area of 0.632 square miles (1.64 km^{2}) (404 acres), all land. According to the June 2012 land records published by the Orange County Public Works, Midway City occupies about 391 acres within an 832-acre rectangular boundary, where the four islands measure approximately as follows: the northeastern island, 296.6 acres; the southwestern island, 40.5 acres; the southeastern island, 33 acres; and the northwestern island, 21.1 acres.

== Demographics ==
Historical population
Census	Pop.	Note	%±
2010	8,485		—
2020	8,825		4.0%
U.S. Decennial Census; 1850–1870 1880-1890; 1900 1910 1920; 1930 1940 1950; 1960 1970 1980; 1990 2000 2010; 2020

Midway City first appeared as a census-designated place in the 2010 U.S. census.

=== Racial and ethnic composition ===
Midway City CDP, California – Racial and ethnic composition Note: the US Census treats Hispanic/Latino as an ethnic category. This table excludes Latinos from the racial categories and assigns them to a separate category. Hispanics/Latinos may be of any race.
Race / Ethnicity (NH = Non-Hispanic)	Pop 2010	Pop 2020	% 2010	% 2020
White alone (NH)	1,776	1,148	20.93%	13.01%
Black or African American alone (NH)	62	45	0.73%	0.51%
Native American or Alaska Native alone (NH)	24	13	0.28%	0.15%
Asian alone (NH)	3,960	5,597	46.67%	52.09%
Native Hawaiian or Pacific Islander alone (NH)	38	16	0.45%	0.18%
Other race alone (NH)	10	24	0.12%	0.27%
Mixed race or Multiracial (NH)	148	179	1.74%	2.03%
Hispanic or Latino (any race)	2,467	2,803	29.07%	31.76%
Total	8,485	8,825	100.00%	100.00%

=== 2020 census ===
As of the 2020 census, Midway City had a population of 8,825 and a population density of 14,467.2 inhabitants per square mile (5,585.8/km^{2}).

The age distribution was 20.8% under the age of 18, 9.9% aged 18 to 24, 25.2% aged 25 to 44, 27.4% aged 45 to 64, and 16.7% aged 65 or older. The median age was 40.0 years. For every 100 females, there were 94.1 males, and for every 100 females age 18 and over there were 92.8 males.

The census reported that 98.5% of the population lived in households, 0.4% lived in non-institutionalized group quarters, and 1.1% were institutionalized. The community was 100.0% urban and 0.0% rural.

There were 2,521 households, of which 36.4% had children under the age of 18. Of all households, 45.8% were married-couple households, 5.6% were cohabiting couple households, 29.4% had a female householder with no partner present, and 19.2% had a male householder with no partner present. About 21.1% of households were one person, and 11.8% had someone living alone who was 65 years of age or older. The average household size was 3.45, and there were 1,835 families (72.8% of all households).

There were 2,595 housing units at an average density of 4,254.1 units per square mile (1,642.5 units/km^{2}). Of all housing units, 2.9% were vacant. Of occupied units, 37.4% were owner-occupied and 62.6% were occupied by renters; the homeowner vacancy rate was 0.4% and the rental vacancy rate was 1.7%.

=== Income and poverty ===
In 2023, the US Census Bureau estimated that the median household income was $64,735, and the per capita income was $27,851. About 10.7% of families and 17.6% of the population were below the poverty line.

=== 2010 census ===
The 2010 United States census reported that Midway City had a population of 8,485. The population density was 13,422.0 inhabitants per square mile (5,182.3/km^{2}). The racial makeup of Midway City was 2,884 (34.0%) White (20.9% Non-Hispanic White), 71 (0.8%) African American, 65 (0.8%) Native American, 3,994 (47.1%) Asian, 40 (0.5%) Pacific Islander, 1,165 (13.7%) from other races, and 266 (3.1%) from two or more races. Hispanic or Latino of any race were 2,467 persons (29.1%).

The Census reported that 8,382 people (98.8% of the population) lived in households, 103 (1.2%) lived in non-institutionalized group quarters, and 0 (0%) were institutionalized.

There were 2,428 households, out of which 1,013 (41.7%) had children under the age of 18 living in them, 1,204 (49.6%) were opposite-sex married couples living together, 339 (14.0%) had a female householder with no husband present, 181 (7.5%) had a male householder with no wife present. There were 91 (3.7%) unmarried opposite-sex partnerships, and 20 (0.8%) same-sex married couples or partnerships. 495 households (20.4%) were made up of individuals, and 236 (9.7%) had someone living alone who was 65 years of age or older. The average household size was 3.45. There were 1,724 families (71.0% of all households); the average family size was 3.99.

The population was spread out, with 2,106 people (24.8%) under the age of 18, 820 people (9.7%) aged 18 to 24, 2,379 people (28.0%) aged 25 to 44, 2,093 people (24.7%) aged 45 to 64, and 1,087 people (12.8%) who were 65 years of age or older. The median age was 37.1 years. For every 100 females, there were 98.0 males. For every 100 females age 18 and over, there were 96.8 males.

There were 2,574 housing units at an average density of 4,071.7 per square mile (1,572.1/km^{2}), of which 1,001 (41.2%) were owner-occupied, and 1,427 (58.8%) were occupied by renters. The homeowner vacancy rate was 0.6%; the rental vacancy rate was 7.2%. 3,985 people (47.0% of the population) lived in owner-occupied housing units and 4,397 people (51.8%) lived in rental housing units.

According to the 2010 United States Census, Midway City had a median household income of $44,595, with 20.9% of the population living below the federal poverty line.

=== Vietnamese population ===
Many Vietnamese have moved into the area, often running businesses in Westminster's Little Saigon District.

== Economy ==
Midway City is a mixture of rural, retirement, and Vietnamese businesses. Dakao Poultry is niche market on Bolsa Avenue in Midway's Little Saigon that sells prepared chicken, roosters, ducks, and other animals selected at the store by customers while the animals are living and prepared while the customer waits. Dakao Poultry's fresh-poultry-for-consumption competitor, Baladi Poultry, is located only about 350 yards away east on Bolsa Avenue. The Animal Assistance League of Orange County, a nonprofit, no-kill humane society that aids lost and homeless pets, also resides in Midway City between the two food animal sellers just off Bolsa Avenue, but south on Jackson Street.

== Points of interest ==
Although unincorporated, Midway City has a variety of points of interest. The Albert E. Schwab American Legion Post had an original lifeguard's tower from Huntington Beach as an unusual landmark in its parking lot, but not anymore. In addition, the interior of the Legion Post's club includes several 40-foot-wide murals commemorating U.S. World War II military history events such as the Attack on Pearl Harbor, the Battle of Midway, and the dropping of the atomic bomb on Nagasaki. Stanton Park includes a $350,000 memorial dedicated to Vietnamese American and general American history.Moreover, visitors can enjoy one of Orange County's biggest St. Patrick's Day celebrations at Brothers of Saint Patrick, which has been in Midway City since 1948.

== Parks and recreation ==
In 1989, the county renamed a park built in Midway City in 1987 as Stanton Park, after Roger R. Stanton, a supervisor on the Orange County Board of Supervisors.

== Government ==
Midway City incorporates its chamber of commerce and homeowners association to act in concert like a city council. The council discusses municipal topics such as lights, water supply, zoning, and neighborhood watch. Monthly meetings take place at the Midway City Community Center in Stanton Park on Bolsa Avenue, where citizens often bring homemade cakes and other food dishes to be shared among the group to these potlucks meetings. The Midway City representatives typically discuss street lights, water supply, zoning, and neighborhood watch and their decisions usually are made final by the Orange County Board of Supervisors.

Law enforcement services are provided by the Orange County Sheriff's Department, while the California Highway Patrol is responsible for traffic enforcement. Fire protection in Midway City is provided by the Orange County Fire Authority with ambulance transport by Care Ambulance Service.

== Education ==
Though the unincorporated city does not have a school district of its own, the Westminster School District operates two public schools in Midway City – DeMille and Jessie Hayden Elementary School. The Ocean View School District also operates public schools within this unincorporated county area, including Star View Elementary School located in the South East area of Midway City.

== Infrastructure ==
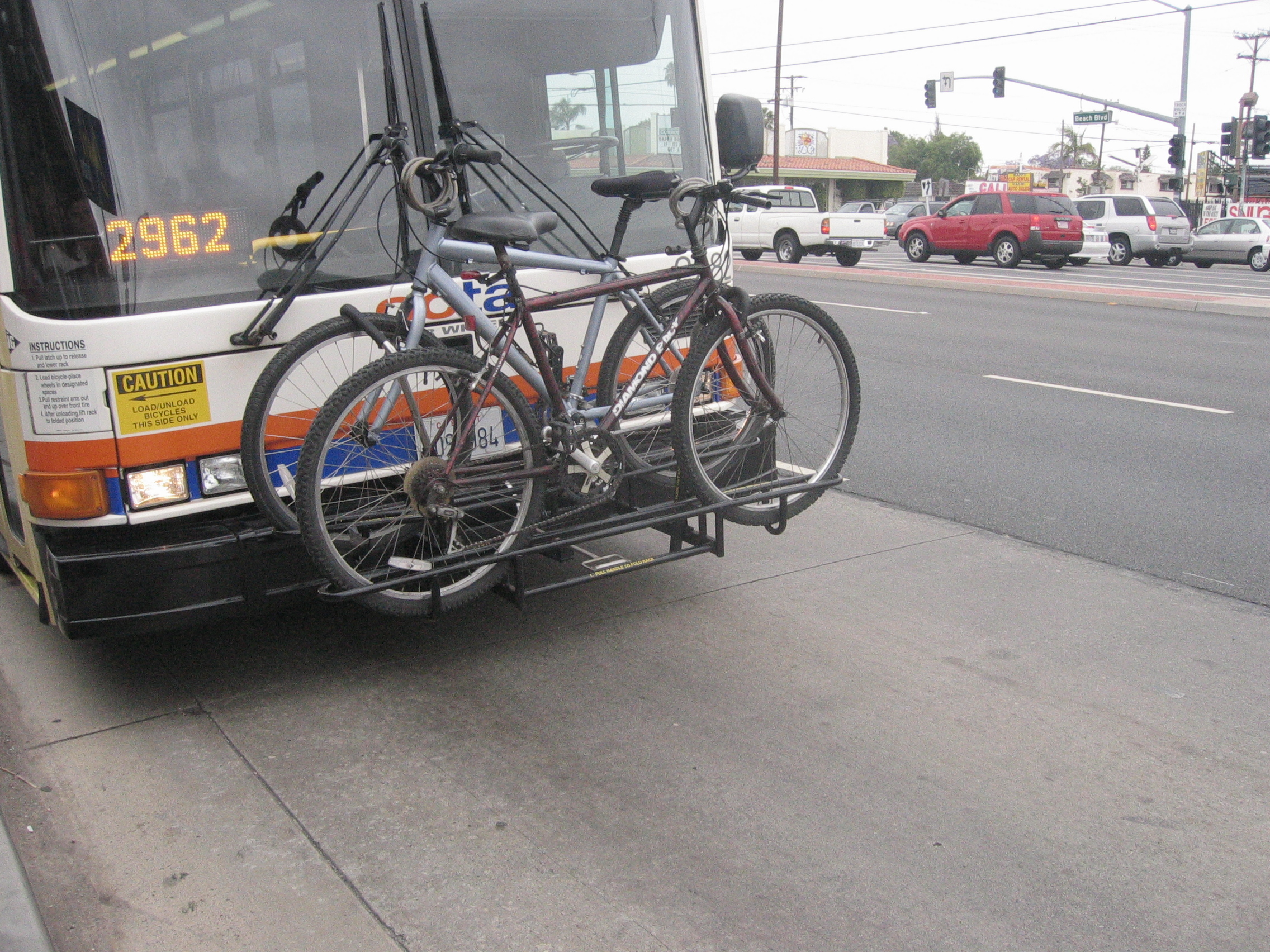
A transit bus's bike rack in use at a Midway City bus stop.

For its water needs, Midway City is divided into four areas, each of which receive water from one of the following four sources: (1) South Midway City Mutual Water Company, Inc. ("South Midway"), (2) Eastside Water Association, Inc. ("Eastside"), and (3) Midway City Water Company ("Midway"), which are three water mutuals formed in the 1930s to supply domestic water from underground water wells to residents, and (4) Westminster Water Department. The three wells are operated and funded by local residents and work via hydro pneumatic pumps drawing 300 to 750 gallons per minute of water above ground to onsite water tanks at three separate locations: 8301 Madison Avenue, 14731 Jackson Street, and 14582 Hunter Lane. The water is distributed through four inch underground steel pipe and six inch (C900) plastic pipe. The water provided by the Eastside Water Association to 300 Midway City homeowners is award-winning water. The water is a flat rate fee in the area that are serviced by the three wells.

Orange County Transportation Authority provides mass transit services for Midway City and other Orange County locations.

== Notable people ==
- Pham Duy, Vietnamese songwriter
- Montell Griffin, American boxer
- Randy Steven Kraft, American serial killer
- Quang Le, a Vietnamese American singer
- Dedee Pfeiffer, actress
- Michelle Pfeiffer, actress
- Francis Townsend, author of the Great Depression era "Townsend Plan" that influenced the establishment of the United States Social Security system.

== Municipal annexation ==
Being an unincorporated county area, municipal annexation by cities which border with Midway City' border is an ongoing issue for Midway City. Attempts at complete annexation have met fierce resistance from Midway's residents, who would rather have their community remain an unincorporated area of Orange County to maintain water and property tax rates that are lower than neighboring communities. However, Midway City's land adjacent to its borders slowly has been annexed by Westminster over time, particularly along the heavily traveled Beach Boulevard/California State Route 39 where that annexed land could be redeveloped to generate significant business tax revenue for Westminster. As a result, Midway City presently is composed of four anemic sections, or "islands", that are having stepped boundaries.

Islands with less than 150 acres can be annexed without a vote by the annexation targeted island. According to the June 2012 land records published by the Orange County Public Facilities and Resources Department, Midway City occupies about 391 acres within an 832-acre rectangular boundary, where the four islands approximately measure as follows: the northeast island 296.6 acres, the southwest island 40.5 acres, the southeast island 33 acres, and northwest island 21.1 acres. Of these, Midway City's southwest island includes land along the heavily traveled Beach Boulevard/California State Route 39 that could be redeveloped to generate significant business tax revenue for Westminster.

== See also ==
- List of neighborhoods and unincorporated communities in Orange County

== Bibliography ==
- Westfall, Douglas Paul (2003). Story of The Town of Bolsa. Orange, California: Paragon Agency. p. 146. ISBN 1-891-03038-8. OCLC 52973607.
- Robertson, Georgia Day; "The Harvest of Hate" / Poston War Relocation Center (1979) [July 26, 1979 and August 21, 1979]. "Japanese American World War II Evacuation Oral History Project". California State University, Fullerton, Oral History Program, Japanese American Project (Interview). Interviewed by Arthur A. Hansen. Costa Mesa, California: O.H. 1753b. p. 457.
