= Rick DiBernardo =

American football player (born 1964)

No. 56, 53
- Position: Linebacker

Personal information
- Born: June 12, 1964 (age 62); Redondo Beach, California, U.S.
- Listed height: 6 ft 3 in (1.91 m)
- Listed weight: 230 lb (104 kg)

Career information
- High school: Edison (Huntington Beach, California)
- College: Notre Dame
- NFL draft: 1986: undrafted

Career history
- Tampa Bay Buccaneers (1986)*; St. Louis Cardinals (1986); Los Angeles Rams (1987)
- * Offseason or practice squad member only

Career NFL statistics
- Fumble recoveries: 2
- Stats at Pro Football Reference

Rick Anthony DiBernardo (born June 12, 1964) is an American former professional football player who was a linebacker who played for the St. Louis Cardinals and Los Angeles Rams of the National Football League (NFL).

== Early life ==
DiBernardo was born on June 12, 1964, in Redondo Beach, California. He attended Edison High School, where he played football and basketball. In his junior season, DiBernardo set an Edison basketball record with 17 field goals against Costa Mesa High School.

As a senior, DiBernardo was named to the South team in the Orange County All-Star basketball game. Edison football coach Bill Workman said DiBernardo "could start at every position on our team except quarterback and tailback and it would be very close at those positions". Parade magazine named DiBernardo to their All-America team, where the magazine's editors selected the best high school football players in America to the honorary team. USC, UCLA, Nebraska, Washington, and Notre Dame all tried to recruit DiBernardo to their football programs. In the visit with Notre Dame, head coach Gerry Faust talked to him about the university's "unique" atmosphere, its high academic standards and the Irish tradition". After he visited the university's campus, DiBernardo chose to attend Notre Dame University.

== College career ==
DiBernardo graduated with majors in marketing and psychology.

== Professional career ==
DiBernardo was not selected by a team in the 1986 NFL draft, where organizations choose athletes to play for their teams, but he later signed with the Tampa Bay Buccaneers. The Buccaneers traded him to the St. Louis Cardinals for a twelfth-round draft pick in the following year's draft. With the Cardinals, DiBernardo played as a reserve linebacker and as a long snapper on special teams. He played in all 16 games that season, as the Cardinals finished with a 4–11–1 record. After his first season in the NFL, DiBernardo considered retiring from the game and going back to Notre Dame for a master's degree. He instead decided to attend Cardinals' training camp, where he learned that Mike Morris had been signed as the St. Louis long snapper.

" [The Rams] said come over to (Ram Camp at Cal State Fullerton) tomorrow. I was just saying, 'There is a God. He is listening.' This is the best thing that's ever happened to me. Friday was the greatest day ever."

— DiBernardo on signing with the Rams

On July 21, 1987, DiBernardo told Cardinals coach Gene Stallings he would be retiring from football, citing concerns about his job security. He showed an interest in a marketing or administration job. On August 14, while he worked for a moving company, DiBernardo received a call from a marketing agency that offered a management position; he accepted. Four hours later, the Los Angeles Rams offered him a tryout. DiBernardo signed with the Rams for "about minimum wage" as a reserve linebacker and long snapper. He played in three games for Los Angeles, and had two fumble recoveries. The Rams released DiBernardo along with nine other players in the beginning of September.

== Personal life ==
In 2008, DiBernardo worked as a mutual fund regional vice president in Orange County, CA and as a part-time college football referee.
