= Ocean View School District =

School district in California

Address
- 17200 Pinehurst Lane Huntington Beach, California, 92647; United States

District information
- Type: Public
- Grades: K–8
- NCES District ID: 0628140

Students and staff
- Students: 7,337
- Teachers: 304.69
- Staff: 443.72
- Student–teacher ratio: 24.08

Other information
- Website: www.ovsd.org

Ocean View School District is a Pre-K to 8 grade elementary and middle school district located in Orange County, California. The Ocean View School District operates preschools, elementary and middle schools' campuses in Huntington Beach, Fountain Valley, Midway City and Westminster.

Ocean View School District operates preschools, elementary schools and middle schools. High school students within the district go to the Huntington Beach Union High School District. Within the Ocean View School District are: two national Blue Ribbon Schools, thirteen California Distinguished Schools, six Title I Academic Achieving Schools, three Golden Bell Schools, one Green Ribbon School, and one NASA Explorer School.

== History ==
The Ocean View School District is one of the oldest school districts in Orange County, California. It was formed in 1874, twenty-four years after California became a state and fifteen years before the County of Orange separated from Los Angeles County, becoming a separate governmental entity. The original Ocean View School was constructed in 1886 on the southwest corner of Huntington Beach Boulevard (Beach Boulevard) and Smeltzer Avenue (Edinger Avenue) in what was known as the village of Smeltzer, now part of north Huntington Beach. Students were from the surrounding farm communities of Ocean View, Smeltzer and Wintersburg Village.

The second Ocean View School was constructed in 1911, at Huntington Beach Boulevard (Beach Boulevard) and Wintersburg Road (Warner Avenue). Students moved from the original school to the new location at the beginning of 1912. The Ocean View Grammar School served as the only school in the Ocean View District until 1956.

== District Strategic Plan 2014-2019 ==
The Local Control and Accountability Plan (LCAP) was created in a collaborative process to set local priorities for 2014 to 2019. A team of District stakeholders generated five overriding Focus Areas and their underlying Strategic Initiatives, which include 1) Effective Instruction and Academic Achievement, 2) Effective Leadership and Professional Development, 3) Engaged Community, 4) Safe and Respectful Environment, and 5) Optimized Resources.

== 2016 Facilities Master Plan ==
Ocean View School District created a digital 2016 Facilities Master Plan website to provide information on the long-term planning for each of the seventeen schools in the district. As of 2015-2016, the total enrollment in the district was 8,725, with a median household income of $79,652. The district's demographic breakdown at the time of the 2016 Facilities Master Plan was: 39.3% White, 38.3% Hispanic or Latino, 14.2% Asian, 4.9% Mixed, 1.3% Filipino, 1.1% Black or African American, 0.4% Pacific Islander, 0.3% American Indian or Alaskan Native, with 0.1% None Reported.

As follow up to the 2016 Facilities Master Plan, Ocean View School District placed a $169-million funding mechanism, Measure R, on the November 8, 2016 ballot. The stated purpose of Measure R is to complete projects that include student safety and campus security systems (security fencing, security cameras, emergency communications systems, smoke detectors, fire alarms, and sprinklers); repair or replace deteriorating roofs, plumbing, heating, ventilation, and electrical systems; provide equipment and technology to support science, reading, music, arts, and math programs; improve access to school facilities for students with disabilities; and ensure playground equipment and play areas meet present-day health and safety standards.

== Finances ==
The district was in financial difficulty in early 2015 because of costs incurred with asbestos remediation in district schools. The district's deputy superintendent reported in late 2015 that the finances subsequently recovered as a result of the negotiation of funding measures and that the district would not be required to sell assets. The district receives nearly $2.3 million per year in total revenue from property it owns and now leases to Lowe's and Wal-Mart and other sites.

== Board of trustees ==
The Ocean View School District of Orange County is governed by a five-member Board of Trustees.

Gina Clayton-Tarvin, president

Patricia Singer, vice president

Keri Gorsage, clerk

Jennifer Rank, member

Vacant Seat

== List of schools ==
=== Preschools ===
- College View
- Oak View
- Westmont

=== Elementary schools ===
- Circle View (open)
- College View (open)
- Golden View (open)
- Harbour View (open)
- Hope View (open)
- Lake View (open)
- Oak View (open)
- Star View (open)
- Village View (open)
- Westmont (open)

=== Middle schools ===
- Marine View (open)
- Mesa View (open)
- Vista View (open)

== Former schools ==
- Crest View (ground leased to Walmart)
- Glen View (currently vacant)
- Haven View (leased to Le Port Academy)
- Meadow View (leased to multiple education institutions)
- Ocean View One Room School House (1874-1911) (SW Corner of Beach Blvd & Edinger Ave)
- Ocean View Elementary School (1912-1956) (SW Corner of Beach Blvd & Warner Ave)
- Park View (open space park, created 2022)
- Rancho View (ground leased to Lowe's)
- Robinwood (leased to Grace Lutheran School)
- Spring View (closed 2024)
- Sun View (repurposed in 2018 for interim campus for Measure R; closed in 2024)
- Pleasant View (closed September 17, 1985 )
