= Westminster, California =

City in California, United States

- City
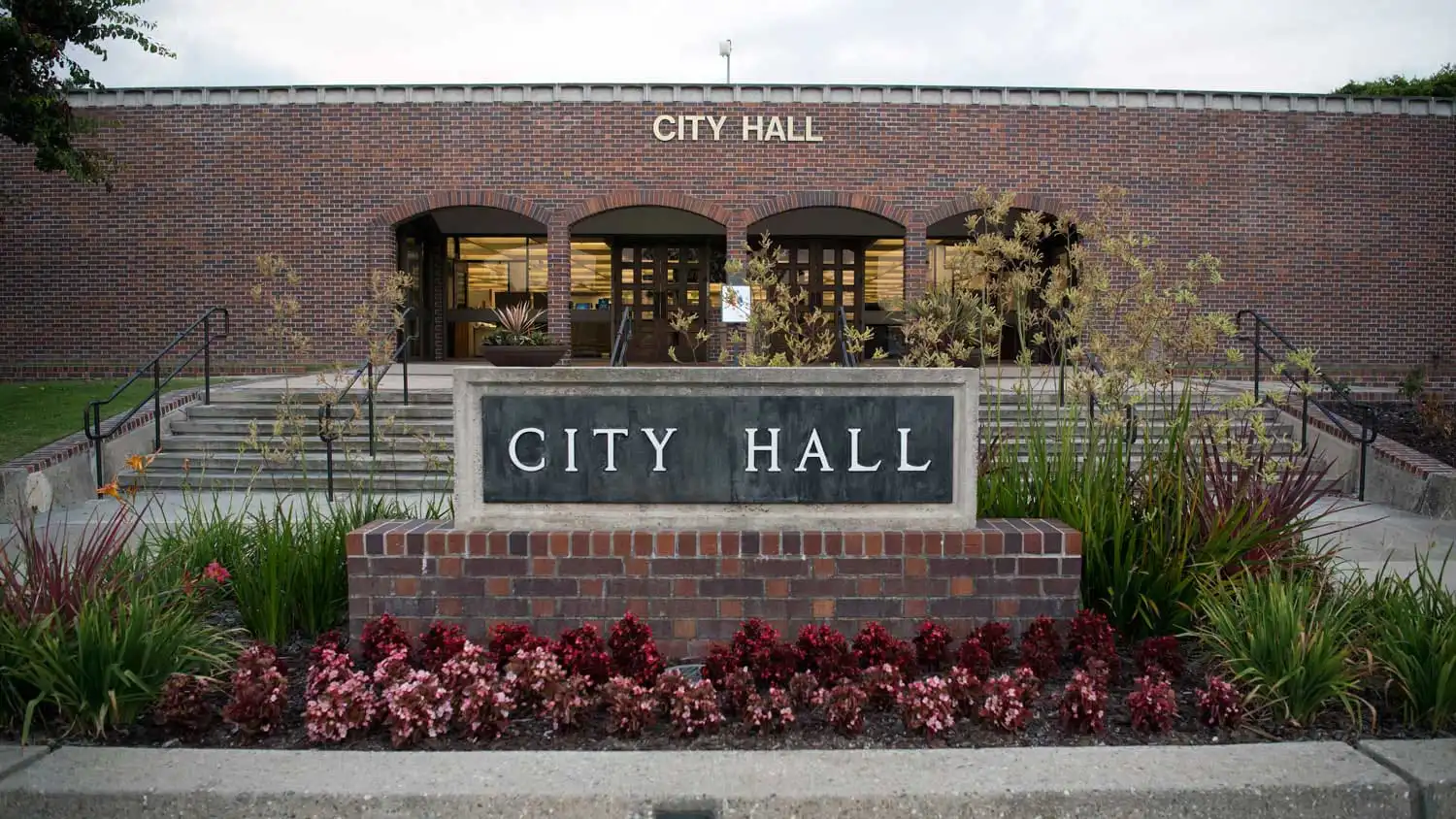
- Westminster City Hall, Tet 2024

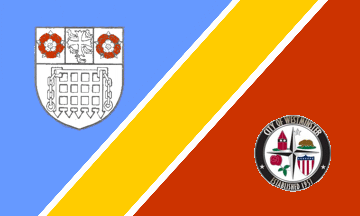
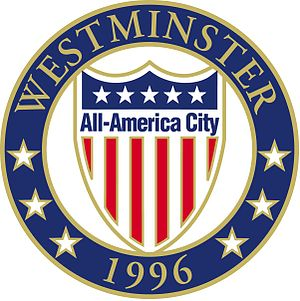
- Flag Seal
- Motto: "The City of Progress Built on Pride."
- Interactive map of Westminster, California
- Location in the United States
- Coordinates: 33°45′5″N 117°59′38″W
- Country: United States
- State: California
- County: Orange
- Incorporated (city): March 27, 1957

Government
  - Type: Council-Manager
  - Mayor: Chi Charlie Nguyen (R)
  - Vice Mayor: Mark Nguyen (District 3)
  - City council: Amy Phan West (District 1) (R); Carlos Manzo (District 2); Mark Nguyen (District 3); Nam Quan Nguyen (District 4)
  - City manager: Christine Cordon

Area
  - Total: 10.04 sq mi (26.00 km^{2})
  - Land: 10.04 sq mi (26.00 km^{2})
  - Water: 0 sq mi (0.00 km^{2}) 0%
- Elevation: 39 ft (12 m)

Population (2020)
  - Total: 90,911
  - Rank: 92nd in California (2024)
  - Density: 9,056/sq mi (3,497/km^{2})
- Time zone: UTC−8 (PST)
  - Summer (DST): UTC−7 (PDT)
- ZIP Codes: 92683–92685
- Area codes: 657/714
- FIPS code: 06-84550
- GNIS feature IDs: 1652811, 2412236
- Website: www.westminster-ca.gov

Westminster is a city in western Orange County, California, United States. Westminster was founded in 1870 by Rev. Lemuel Webber as a Presbyterian temperance colony and was incorporated in 1957.

Westminster is bordered by the city of Seal Beach on the west, by Garden Grove on the north and east, and by Huntington Beach and Fountain Valley on the south. Santa Ana, the county seat of Orange County, is east of Westminster.

Westminster has one of the largest Vietnamese populations in the US. They settled largely in Little Saigon, and the city is known as the "capital" of overseas Vietnamese with 39,799 Vietnamese Americans, or 43.8% of the total population, as of the 2020 United States census.

In the 1947 court case Mendez v. Westminster, Sylvia Mendez and her family challenged the segregation of Mexican American students in the Westminster School District. The case resulted in a federal ruling that ended school segregation practices in California, marking an important step toward broader desegregation in the United States.

Westminster won the All-America City Award in 1996.

In 2026, Westminster went viral for the decision of its City Council (4-1) and mayor to name a street after Charlie Kirk.

== History ==
Westminster was founded in 1870 by Rev. Lemuel Webber as a Presbyterian temperance colony. The name is derived from the Westminster Assembly of 1643, which established the basic tenets of the Presbyterian faith. During the early years of its history, farmers refused to harvest grapes since they associated grapes with alcohol.

During the late 1800s, arable land held dairy farms alongside agricultural plots which cultivated walnuts, strawberries, celery, and lima beans until they were replaced by the sugar beet industry at the turn of the century.

A change in tariffs laws along with an influx of beet pests resulted in the collapse of the Southern California Sugar Beet Industry and was supplemented by goldfish farms.

Transitions from agricultural spacing to suburban housing was delayed by the economic strain of the Great Depression and later 1933 earthquake as well as a severe flood in 1938. The varied residential landscape is a direct result from the relatively early homeowner development of less uniform spaces.

In 1947, Westminster became the site of Mendez v. Westminster, a landmark federal court case that challenged the segregation of Mexican American students in Orange County schools. The case was brought by the family of Sylvia Mendez against several school districts, including the Westminster School District. The ruling led to the end of school segregation practices in California and is considered an important precursor to later desegregation efforts in the United States, including Brown v. Board of Education.

Westminster was incorporated in 1957, at which time it had 10,755 residents. Originally, the city was named Tri-City because it was to be the amalgamation of three cities: Westminster, Barber City, and Midway City. Midway City ultimately refused incorporation, leaving only Barber City to be absorbed into the new city, which changed its name to Westminster in a vote just five months later. The former Barber City was located in the western portion of the current city of Westminster.

The city has attracted large numbers of immigrants, refugees, and LGBTQ+ groups due to historic accessibility and community that had been built. One of the most notable examples of this is the influx of a Vietnamese refugee population during the 1970s due to the Vietnam War. Westminster hosts a portion of Little Saigon, the largest population of ethnically Vietnamese people outside of Vietnam. The heart of the enclave runs along Bolsa Avenue, where historic shops such as Danh's Pharmacy (one of the first Vietnamese businesses on the street) and cultural icons like Asian Garden Mall (also known as Phước Lộc Thọ) line the street. The area is the first officially recognized Vietnamese business enclave.

== Geography ==
According to the United States Census Bureau, the city has a total area of 10.0 square miles (26 km^{2}), all land. The San Diego Freeway and a short segment of the Garden Grove Freeway pass through Westminster.

Westminster is bordered by the city of Seal Beach on the west, by Garden Grove on the north and east, and by Huntington Beach and Fountain Valley on the south. Santa Ana, the county seat of Orange County, is east of Westminster, although a small portion of Garden Grove lies between the two cities. Westminster borders the unincorporated area of Midway City, except for a small portion where Midway City borders Huntington Beach on the south. The Little Saigon district of the town is mostly situated on Bolsa Avenue between Magnolia Street and Brookhurst Street.

=== Climate ===
Climate data for Westminster
Month	Jan	Feb	Mar	Apr	May	Jun	Jul	Aug	Sep	Oct	Nov	Dec	Year
Mean daily maximum °F (°C)	69.1 (20.6)	70.0 (21.1)	71.1 (21.7)	73.9 (23.3)	75.0 (23.9)	79.0 (26.1)	82.9 (28.3)	84.0 (28.9)	82.9 (28.3)	80.1 (26.7)	73.9 (23.3)	70.0 (21.1)	76.0 (24.4)
Mean daily minimum °F (°C)	46.9 (8.3)	48.0 (8.9)	50 (10)	52.0 (11.1)	55.9 (13.3)	60.1 (15.6)	63.0 (17.2)	64.0 (17.8)	63.0 (17.2)	57.9 (14.4)	51.1 (10.6)	46.0 (7.8)	54.8 (12.7)
Average precipitation inches (mm)	3.18 (81)	3.05 (77)	2.78 (71)	0.67 (17)	0.25 (6.4)	0.11 (2.8)	0.02 (0.51)	0.12 (3.0)	0.34 (8.6)	0.36 (9.1)	1.17 (30)	1.79 (45)	13.84 (351.41)
Source: www.intellicast.com, September 2017

== Demographics ==
Historical population
Census	Pop.	Note	%±
1890	585		—
1900	1,590		171.8%
1910	4,550		186.2%
1920	7,997		75.8%
1930	14,822		85.3%
1940	16,115		8.7%
1950	23,433		45.4%
1960	33,663		43.7%
1970	60,076		78.5%
1980	71,133		18.4%
1990	78,118		9.8%
2000	88,207		12.9%
2010	89,701		1.7%
2020	90,911		1.3%
U.S. Decennial Census; 1850–1870 1880–1890; 1900 1910 1920; 1930 1940 1950; 1960 1970 1980; 1990 2000 2010 2020

=== Racial and ethnic composition ===
Westminster city, California – Racial and Ethnic Composition Note: the US Census treats Hispanic/Latino as an ethnic category. This table excludes Latinos from the racial categories and assigns them to a separate category. Hispanics/Latinos may be of any race.
Race / Ethnicity (NH = Non-Hispanic)	Pop 1980	Pop 1990	Pop 2000	Pop 2010	Pop 2020	% 1980	% 1990	% 2000	% 2010	% 2020
White alone (NH)	54,977	44,907	31,962	22,972	17,962	77.29%	57.49%	36.24%	25.61%	19.76%
Black or African American alone (NH)	475	795	764	700	853	0.67%	1.02%	0.87%	0.78%	0.94%
Native American or Alaska Native alone (NH)	571	347	293	132	146	0.80%	0.44%	0.33%	0.15%	0.16%
Asian alone (NH)	6,317	17,105	33,511	42,414	46,513	8.88%	21.90%	37.99%	47.28%	51.16%
Native Hawaiian or Pacific Islander alone (NH)	6,317	17,105	393	324	415	8.88%	21.90%	0.45%	0.36%	0.46%
Other race alone (NH)	226	68	101	113	250	0.32%	0.09%	0.11%	0.13%	0.27%
Mixed race or Multiracial (NH)	x	x	2,045	1,870	2,427	x	x	2.32%	2.08%	2.67%
Hispanic or Latino (any race)	8,567	14,896	19,138	21,176	22,345	12.04%	19.07%	21.70%	23.61%	24.58%
Total	71,133	78,118	88,207	89,701	90,911	100.00%	100.00%	100.00%	100.00%	100.00%

=== 2020 census ===
As of the 2020 census, Westminster had a population of 90,911. The population density was 9,056.7 inhabitants per square mile (3,496.8/km^{2}). The racial makeup of Westminster was 23.1% White, 1.0% African American, 0.8% Native American, 51.4% Asian, 0.5% Pacific Islander, 14.3% from other races, and 8.8% from two or more races. Hispanic or Latino of any race were 24.6% of the population.

The age distribution was 19.1% under the age of 18, 9.6% aged 18 to 24, 23.8% aged 25 to 44, 28.9% aged 45 to 64, and 18.6% who were 65 years of age or older. The median age was 42.8 years. For every 100 females, there were 95.4 males, and for every 100 females age 18 and over there were 93.7 males age 18 and over.

100.0% of residents lived in urban areas, while 0.0% lived in rural areas. The census reported that 99.3% of the population lived in households, 0.3% lived in non-institutionalized group quarters, and 0.4% were institutionalized.

There were 27,025 households, out of which 34.6% included children under the age of 18. Of all households, 52.5% were married-couple households, 5.1% were cohabiting couple households, 16.4% had a male householder with no spouse or partner present, and 26.0% had a female householder with no spouse or partner present. About 16.1% of all households were made up of individuals, and 9.4% had someone living alone who was 65 years of age or older. The average household size was 3.34. There were 21,111 families (78.1% of all households).

There were 27,910 housing units at an average density of 2,780.4 units per square mile (1,073.5 units/km^{2}), of which 27,025 (96.8%) were occupied. Of these, 53.7% were owner-occupied and 46.3% were occupied by renters. 3.2% of housing units were vacant. The homeowner vacancy rate was 0.5% and the rental vacancy rate was 3.3%.

The most reported ancestries were:

- Vietnamese (45.5%)
- Mexican (20.3%)
- English (5.8%)
- German (5.6%)
- Irish (5.2%)
- Chinese (2.9%)
- Filipino (2.2%)
- Italian (2.1%)
- Japanese (1.3%)
- French (1.3%)

=== 2023 estimate ===
In 2023, the US Census Bureau estimated that the median household income was $82,686, and the per capita income was $34,477. About 14.0% of families and 15.8% of the population were below the poverty line.

=== 2010 census ===
At the 2010 census Westminster had a population of 89,701. The population density was 8,926.5 inhabitants per square mile (3,446.5/km^{2}). The racial makeup of Westminster was 32,037 (35.7%) White (25.6% Non-Hispanic White), 849 (0.9%) African American, 397 (0.4%) Native American, 42,597 (47.5%) Asian, 361 (0.4%) Pacific Islander, 10,229 (11.4%) from other races, and 3,231 (3.6%) from two or more races. Hispanic or Latino of any race were 21,176 persons (23.6%). A total of 36,058 residents were of Vietnamese ancestry (40.2% of city residents), the highest concentration of Vietnamese Americans of any community in the United States.

The census reported that 89,031 people (99.3% of the population) lived in households, 381 (0.4%) lived in non-institutionalized group quarters, and 289 (0.3%) were institutionalized.

There were 26,164 households, 10,759 (41.1%) had children under the age of 18 living in them, 14,986 (57.3%) were opposite-sex married couples living together, 3,681 (14.1%) had a female householder with no husband present, 1,810 (6.9%) had a male householder with no wife present. There were 1,114 (4.3%) unmarried opposite-sex partnerships, and 151 (0.6%) same-sex married couples or partnerships. 4,247 households (16.2%) were one person and 2,170 (8.3%) had someone living alone who was 65 or older. The average household size was 3.40. There were 20,477 families (78.3% of households); the average family size was 3.74.

The age distribution was 20,920 people (23.3%) under the age of 18, 8,568 people (9.6%) aged 18 to 24, 24,065 people (26.8%) aged 25 to 44, 23,356 people (26.0%) aged 45 to 64, and 12,792 people (14.3%) who were 65 or older. The median age was 38.7 years. For every 100 females, there were 97.8 males. For every 100 females age 18 and over, there were 96.4 males.

There were 27,650 housing units at an average density of 2,751.5 per square mile, of the occupied units 15,135 (57.8%) were owner-occupied and 11,029 (42.2%) were rented. The homeowner vacancy rate was 1.5%; the rental vacancy rate was 7.3%. 51,408 people (57.3% of the population) lived in owner-occupied housing units and 37,623 people (41.9%) lived in rental housing units.

=== 2009–2013 estimate ===
During 2009–2013, Westminster had a median household income of $52,633, with 16.7% of the population living below the federal poverty line.

== Government ==
In the California State Legislature, Westminster is in the 36th senatorial district, represented by Republican Tony Strickland, and in the 70th Assembly district, represented by Republican Tri Ta.

In the United States House of Representatives, Westminster is in California's 45th congressional district, represented by Democrat Derek Tran.

In the Orange County Board of Supervisors, Westminster is in first district represented by Janet Nguyen since 2024.

Westminster has a city council form of local government. The city council is the legislative body of Westminster, and councilmembers are elected to four-year terms in their respective districts, a total of four. The city council focuses on maintaining order and resolving issues to progress development of the city. Westminster also has a mayor who is elected at-large by the citywide electorate. Currently, the Westminster City Council is made up of:

- Chi Charlie Nguyen, Mayor (elected in 2022)
- Amy Phan West, Councilmember, District 1 (elected in 2022)
- Carlos Manzo, Vice Mayor, District 2 (elected in 2020)
- Mark Nguyen, Councilmember, District 3 (elected in 2024)
- NamQuan Nguyen, Councilmember, District 4 (elected in 2022)

=== Crime ===
2023 Uniform Crime Report data
	Aggravated Assault	Homicide	Rape	Robbery	Burglary	Larceny Theft	Motor Vehicle Theft	Arson
Westminster	271	3	15	92	434	1,739	281	10

== Economy ==
=== Top employers ===
According to the city's 2017 Comprehensive Annual Financial Report, the top employers in the city are:

#	Employer	# of Employees
1	Westminster School District	1,029
2	Kindred Hospital-Westminster	450
3	Walmart	346
4	Target	325
5	City of Westminster	320
6	Macy's	300
7	Honda World	217
8	Westminster High School	200
9	J. C. Penney Co	185

=== Business sector ===
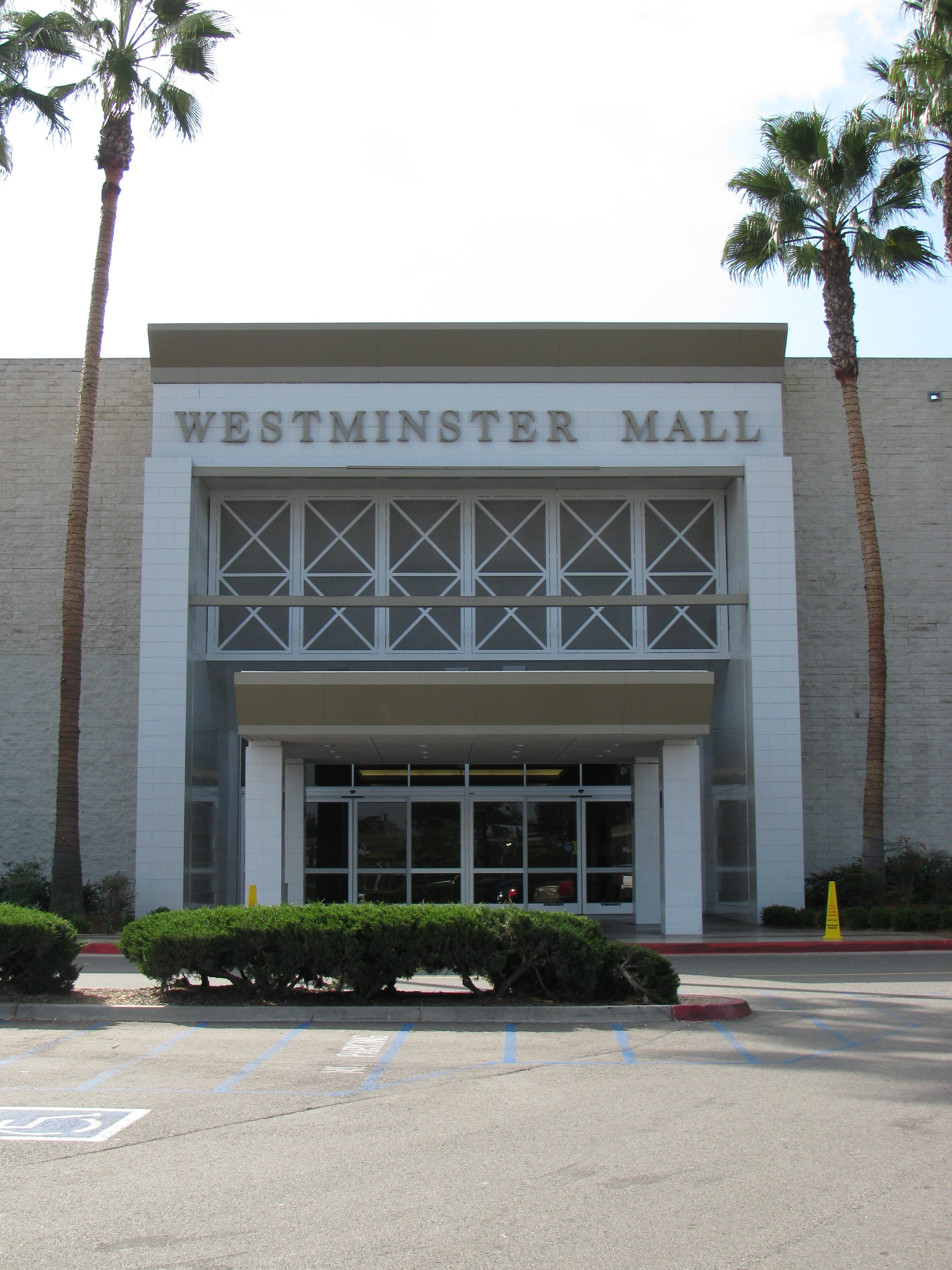
Westminster Mall entrance in 2009

The city's major shopping mall was Westminster Mall, which consisted of more than 160 stores until its closure in October 2025. The mall was located south of the 405 freeway, between Goldenwest Street and Edwards Street.

Westminster's Little Saigon community is home to the Asian Garden Mall (Phước Lộc Thọ), a large Asian mall.

Since joining the Sequential Brands company, the DVS Shoes footwear brand relocated from Torrance, California to Westminster. The company's headquarters is located on Fenwick Lane.

== Education ==
Four school districts have boundaries that cover parts of Westminster:

- Westminster School District (elementary)
- Garden Grove Unified School District (unified K-12)
- Huntington Beach Union High School District (covers the Westminster and Ocean View areas)
- Ocean View School District (elementary)

Huntington Beach Union HSD operates Westminster High School, while Garden Grove USD operates La Quinta High School.

Some sections of HBUHSD Westminster are zoned to Ocean View High School.

Asahi Gakuen, a part-time Japanese school, leases La Quinta on Saturdays for its Orange County campus. Previously Bolsa Grande High School in Garden Grove, next to Westminster housed the Asahi Gakuen Orange County campus.

== Infrastructure ==
=== Transportation ===
Interstate 405 and State Route 22 provide regional freeway access through Westminster. Additionally, State Route 39 (Beach Boulevard) connects Westminster to Huntington Beach and other destinations in northern Orange County.

Orange County Transportation Authority operates bus service in Westminster.

=== Water services ===
Water in Westminster is supplied by the City of Westminster Water Division, which sources its water from the Metropolitan Water District of Southern California via Municipal Water District of Orange County. This water is imported from Northern California and the Colorado River. In addition, groundwater is pumped from an underground aquifer managed by Orange County Water District by 9 wells within the city.

== Landmarks ==
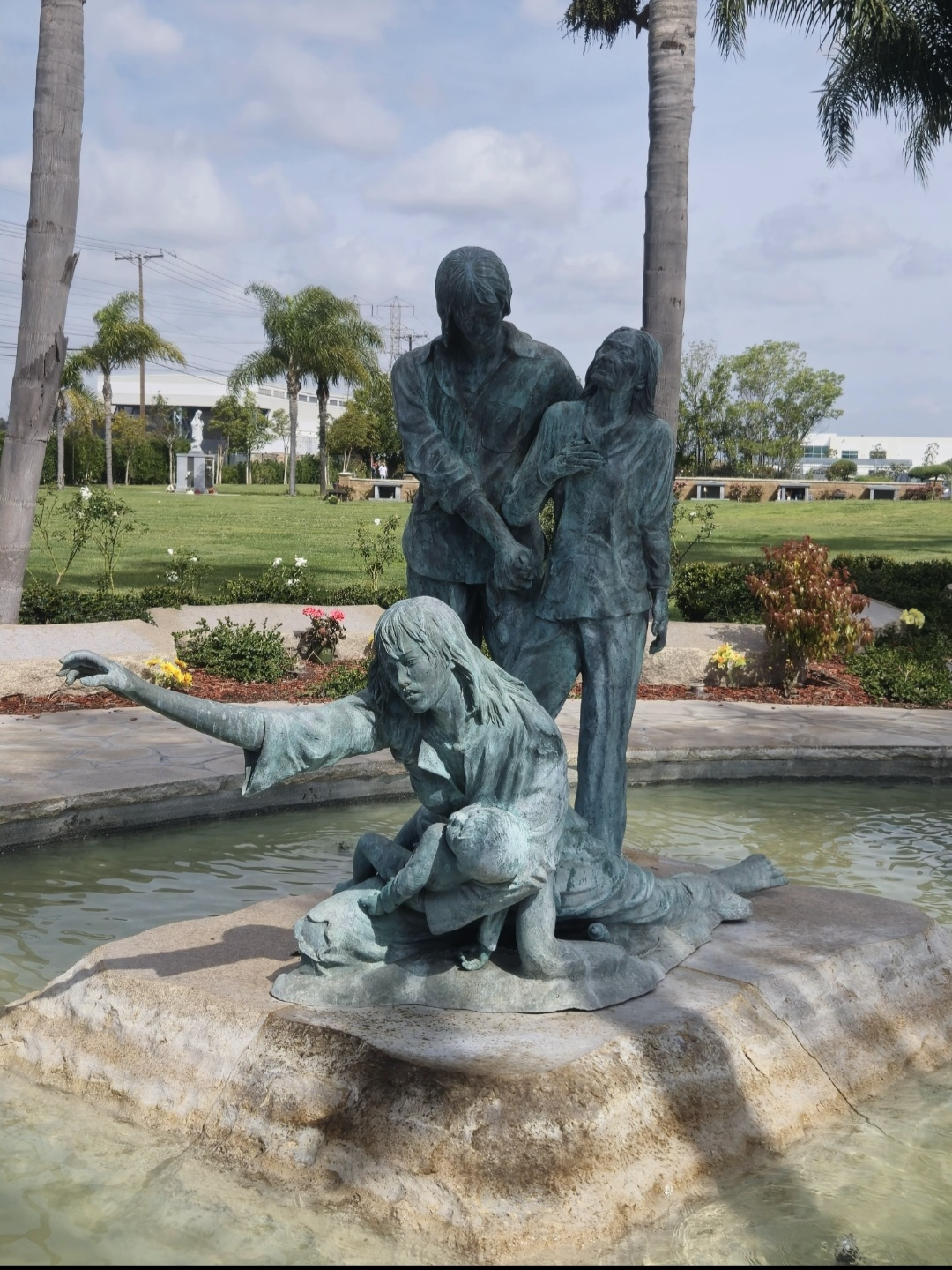
Memorial Park and Mortuary Statue of the "Boat People"

- A memorial for the victims of the Pan Am plane involved in the Tenerife Disaster of March 27, 1977, is located in Westminster.
- The Vietnam War Memorial is located Sid Goldstein Freedom Park, next to the Westminster Civic Center. The project was initiated by Westminster City Councilman Frank G. Fry in 1997 and completed in 2003.
- Final resting place for frontman Bradley Nowell of the band Sublime. Nowell died of a heroin overdose in his San Francisco hotel room on May 25, 1996.
- A statue is dedicated to Trần Hưng Đạo, with the road Bolsa Avenue given an alternative name "Đại Lộ Trần Hưng Đạo", translating to "Trần Hưng Đạo Boulevard".
- Westminster Museum
- Mendez Tribute Monument Park, a public park in Westminster that commemorates Mendez v. Westminster (1947) and honors the contributions of Sylvia Mendez and her family to the desegregation of public schools in California.
- The All-American Way street by Westminster Civic Center was designated as "Charlie Kirk Way" in November 2025 by the Westminster City Council following the death of conservative activist Charlie Kirk. The effort was led by Mayor Chi Charlie Nguyen.

== Notable people ==
- Sylvia Mendez (1936), American civil rights activist associated with Mendez v. Westminster (1947), which ended school segregation practices in California; awarded the Presidential Medal of Freedom in 2011.
- Ron McNeil, co-founder of Emmy Award-winning Beatles tribute band The Fab Four: The Ultimate Tribute
- Harrod Blank, documentary filmmaker
- Jeromy Burnitz, MLB player
- Mike Burns, MLB player
- Paul Caligiuri, soccer player
- Mark Eaton, former Utah Jazz player
- Danny Flores (1929–2006), head of the rock group The Champs
- Ken Hoang, professional video gamer and contestant on Survivor Gabon
- Gerard Huerta, designer of the AC/DC logo and other logos
- Ryan Klesko, former MLB first baseman
- Nguyễn Cao Kỳ (1930–2011), former Prime Minister of South Vietnam, lived in exile in Westminster, where he ran a liquor store
- Iris Kyle, 10-time overall Ms. Olympia professional bodybuilder
- Trent McDuffie, NFL Cornerback Kansas City Chiefs
- Carlos Palomino, former welterweight boxing champion
- Vang Pao, Hmong former Major General of the Royal Lao Army
- Nam Phan, professional mixed martial artist and a contestant in The Ultimate Fighter: Team GSP vs. Team Koscheck
- Poreotics, dance crew who won ABDC Season 5 in 2010
- Dylan Rieder, professional skateboarder, artist, and model
- Stafford Repp, film and television actor
- Westminster Chorus, won the Pavarotti Trophy of Choir of the World 2009
- Geoff Zanelli, prominent Emmy Award-Winning film and TV composer
