= Westminster Museum =

Museum in California

- Logo of the historical society

- Location within the Los Angeles metropolitan area Location within California Location within the United States
- Established: 1988
- Location: 8612 Westminster Blvd., Westminster, CA 92683
- Coordinates: 33.7592°N 117.9787°W
- Type: Historical museum
- Owner: Westminster Historical Society
- Website: westminsterhistorical.wordpress.com

Westminster Museum is a historical museum in Westminster, California located in Blakey Historical Park. It contains three historic buildings, the McCoy-Hare House, the Midway City Women's Club Building, and Warne Farmhouse. It is managed by the Westminster Historical Society.

== History ==
The Westminster Historical Society was formed in 1974, and the grounds the museum lies on, encompassing 2 acres (0.81 ha), were given to the organization by Lea Ora Blakey, an early resident of Westminster. The building the museum is located in was formerly the Midway City Women's Club Building, built in 1929. It was relocated to the park and restored in 1988. In 1989, the museum acquired the Warne Farmhouse from the Warne Family and moved it to Blakey Historical Park. The Farmhouse was refurnished in 1995 to appear as it would have in the early 20th-century. In 2011, many items from the farm were auctioned off.

== Exhibits ==
Westminster Museum has an exhibit containing historical farm equipment that includes a 125-year-old sugar beet wagon, John Deere sweep rake and spring-tooth harrow, and an International Harvester hay loader. The museum also contains a 250-year-old grandfather clock, a foot-pedal sewing machine, two mid-1900s fire trucks, and a paramedic van from the 1970s.

The McCoy-Hare House was Westminster's first drugstore and was built from 1873 to 1874. It was the home of Dr. James McCoy, the city's first doctor. The Warne Farmhouse was built in 1915 and functioned as a blacksmith shop and pump house. There is also a 1904 windmill. The museum also contains the Shutter Shak, a building in the shape of a camera that was built in 1976 to sell cameras.
