= Ocean View High School =

Public high school in Huntington Beach, California, United States

Location
- 17071 Gothard Street; Huntington Beach, CA; United States; 33°42′51″N 118°00′03″W

Information
- Type: Public high school
- Motto: Knowledge is Power
- Established: 1976
- School district: Huntington Beach Union High School District
- Principal: Jodi Young
- Enrollment: 1,216 (2023-2024)
- Colors: Cardinal, gold, and white
- Athletics conference: CIF Southern Section; Golden West League
- Nickname: Seahawks
- Website: ovhs.info

Ocean View High School (OVHS) is a public comprehensive college-preparatory academy located in Huntington Beach, California. It is part of the Huntington Beach Union High School District (HBUHSD) and serves approximately 1,350 students. The school's mascot is the Seahawk. OVHS is notable for offering the only International Baccalaureate (IB) program in the district and a college preparatory curriculum with Advanced Placement (AP) courses.

== History ==
Ocean View High School was established in 1976. Over the years, the school has expanded programs in academics, athletics, and music.

== Governance ==
OVHS is governed by the Huntington Beach Union High School District.

== Curriculum ==
OVHS provides a college-preparatory curriculum, including:

- International Baccalaureate (IB) program
- Advanced Placement (AP) courses in various subjects
- College preparatory courses in English, mathematics, science, social studies, foreign languages, and electives

== Extracurricular activities ==
OVHS offers a wide range of extracurriculars, including:

=== Athletics ===
Ocean View High School's sports teams are members of the Golden West League within the CIF Southern Section. The school offers a range of sports, including marching band, cross-country, track and field, golf, swimming, basketball, wrestling, volleyball, football, soccer, tennis, water polo, and softball.

- In 1992, the girls' cross country team, won the Division II CIF State Title.
- In 1997, the girls' volleyball team won California Div III State Championship.

=== Music ===
Marching band and color guard (Seahawk Squadron). The Seahawk Squadron has won 1st place in the Southern California School Band and Orchestra Association (SCSBOA) State Band Championships for Division 1 in 2010, 2011, 2012, 2017, and 2019.

== Awards and recognition ==
=== School ranking ===
In 2008, OVHS was ranked number 775 on the list of top 1,000 high schools in the United States, published by Newsweek Magazine. The public schools are ranked by the number of Advanced Placement or International Baccalaureate test taken by all students in 2007 divided by the number of graduating seniors.

- In 2013–2014 it has been ranked #442 in the state and #2018 in the US.
- Two-time California Distinguished School

== Notable alumni ==
- Michael Arrington, TechCrunch founder
- Anthony Brown (born 1992), NBA basketball player formerly for the Minnesota Timberwolves, and currently in the Israeli Basketball Premier League
- Alex Burnett, professional MLB player, Chicago Cubs
- The Rev, former drummer of Avenged Sevenfold
- Wayne Carlander, former basketball player at USC
- Justin Brunette, baseball player at San Diego State, MLB Cardinals
- Carmindy, professional make-up artist on TLC's What Not to Wear
- Paul Frank Sunich, of Paul Frank Industries
- Synyster Gates, lead guitarist of Avenged Sevenfold
- Jason Lee, actor
- Paul McGinnis, puppeteer for Sesame Street
- Marshall Rohner, Guitarist T.S.O.L., The Cruzados
- Kim Saiki, professional golfer on the LPGA tour
- Rusty Smith, Olympic speed skater
- Samoa Joe, All Elite Wrestling World Champion
- Jim Usevitch, former basketball player for BYU, the CBA, and European Professional Leagues.
- Byron Velvick, champion bass fisherman and appeared as TV's "Bachelor"
- Vince Walker, lead vocals of the Orange County based ska band Suburban Legends
- Geoff Zanelli, Emmy Award-winning film composer
- Lovieanne Jung
