= Sunset League (California) =

High school athletic conference in California

The Sunset League is a high school athletic league in Orange County, California affiliated with the CIF Southern Section. The first season was 1937-38 with the charter members Anaheim High School, Huntington Beach High School, Newport Harbor High School, Orange High School, Jordan High School (Long Beach), and Excelsior High School. The name "Sunset" (after the Sunset Oil Company) was selected from a list of 16 suggested names at the first league meeting on April 26, 1937 at Anaheim High School. Other names considered were Pacific, Little Six, Mission, Central, Bi County, Santa Ana Valley, Orla (Orange-Los Angeles), Olympic, Suburban, Valencia, Olac (Orange-Los Angeles counties), Piedmont, Padre, Monte Vista, and Del Mar. The purpose of the new league was to equalize competition between schools based, in part, on the size of schools.

Twenty-four different schools have been members over the 85 seasons of competition led by Huntington Beach at 78 years thru the 2021-22 term. Marina has been a member for 58 seasons, Newport Harbor 55, Edison 48, and Fountain Valley 48 seasons. Not all years of membership have been continuous.

Other current members (with seasons as a Sunset Member) Los Alamitos (30) and Corona del Mar (6).

== Sports ==
FALL: Boys Cross Country Girls Cross Country Girls Golf Girls Tennis Girls Volleyball Boys Water Polo

WINTER: Boys Basketball, Girls Basketball, Boys Soccer, Girls Soccer, Girls Water Polo, Boys Wrestling, Girls Wrestling

SPRING: Baseball, Girls Beach Volleyball, Boys Diving, Girls Diving, Boys Golf, Boys Lacrosse, Girls Lacrosse, Softball, Girls Swimming, Boys Swimming, Boys Tennis, Girls Track and Field, Boys Track and Field, Boys Volleyball
