= Lemon grove =

A grove of lemon trees is a citrus grove specifically of the lemon. Other things named that include:

- Lemon Grove, California
  - Lemon Grove School District
    - Lemon Grove Middle School
  - Lemon Grove Depot
  - Lemon Grove Incident
- Lemon Grove, Florida

== See also ==
- Lemon Grove Kids Meet the Monsters
- Road to the Lemon Grove
