= Felicitas Méndez =

Puerto Rican activist

Felicitas Gómez Martínez de Méndez
- Felicitas with her husband Gonzalo Méndez
- Born: Felicita Gómez; February 5, 1916; Juncos, Puerto Rico
- Died: April 12, 1998 (aged 82); Fullerton, California, U.S.
- Occupations: Farmer, American civil rights pioneer
- Years active: 1943–1970
- Known for: Success in ending California school segregation
- Spouse: Gonzalo Méndez
- Children: Four sons: Victor, Gonzalo, Jerome and Phillip; two daughters, Sylvia Méndez and Sandra Durán

Notes
- Thurgood Marshall's amicus brief filed for Mendez's on behalf of the NAACP contained the arguments he would later use in the Brown case.

Felicitas Gómez Martínez de Méndez (February 5, 1916 – April 12, 1998) was a Puerto Rican activist in the American civil rights movement. In 1946, Méndez and her husband, Gonzalo, led an educational civil rights battle that changed California and set an important legal precedent for ending de jure segregation in the United States. Their landmark desegregation case, known as Mendez v. Westminster, paved the way for meaningful integration and public-school reform.

== Early years ==
Méndez (birth name: Felicita Gómez) was born in the town of Juncos in Puerto Rico. The Gómez family moved from Puerto Rico to the U.S. mainland. There, they faced, and were subject to, the discrimination that was widespread throughout the United States. Felicitas and her siblings were racialized as "black."

When she was 12 years old, the family moved to Southern California to work the fields – where they were racialized as "Mexican." In 1936, she married Gonzalo Méndez, an immigrant from Mexico who had become a naturalized citizen of the United States. They opened a bar and grill called La Prieta in Santa Ana. They had three children and moved from Santa Ana to Westminster, where they leased a 40-acre asparagus farm from the Munemitsus, a Japanese-American family that had been sent to an internment camp during World War II. Although the farm was a successful agricultural business venture, it was still a period in history when racial discrimination against Hispanics, and racial and ethnic minorities in general, was widespread throughout the United States.

== School segregation in California ==
In the 1940s, there were only two schools in Westminster: Hoover Elementary and 17th Street Elementary. Orange County schools were segregated, and the Westminster school district was no exception. The district mandated separate campuses for Hispanics and white Anglos. Méndez's three children, Sylvia, Gonzalo Jr. and Jerome Méndez, attended Hoover Elementary, a two-room wooden shack in the middle of the city's Mexican neighborhood, along with the other Hispanics. 17th Street Elementary, which was a "whites-only" segregated school, was located about a mile away. Unlike Hoover, the 17th Street Elementary school was among a row of palm and pine trees and had a lawn lining the school's brick and concrete facade.

Realizing that the 17th Street Elementary school provided better books and educational benefits, Méndez and her husband, Gonzalo, decided that they would like to have their children and nephews enrolled there. Thus, in 1943, when she was only eight years old, their daughter Sylvia Méndez accompanied her aunt Sally Vidaurri, her brothers and cousins to enroll at the 17th Street Elementary School. Her aunt was told by school officials that her children, who had light skin, would be permitted to enroll – but that neither Sylvia Méndez nor her brothers would be allowed because they were dark-skinned and had a Hispanic surname. Mrs. Vidaurri stormed out of the school with her children, niece and nephews, and recounted her experience to her brother, Gonzalo, and her sister-in-law.

== Mendez v. Westminster ==
External audio
- You may view: "Civil Rights- Mendez vs. Westminster"; By: Oscar Rosales on YouTube.

Méndez and her husband, Gonzalo, took upon themselves the task of leading a community battle that would change the California public education system and set an important legal precedent for ending segregation in the United States. Méndez tended the family's agricultural business, giving her husband the much-needed time to meet with community leaders to discuss the injustices of the segregated school system. He also spoke to other parents, with the intention of recruiting families from the four Orange County communities into a massive, countywide lawsuit. Initially, Gonzalo received little support from the local Latino organizations – but, finally, on March 2, 1945, he and four other Mexican-American fathers from the Gómez, Palomino, Estrada, and Ramírez families filed a lawsuit in federal court in Los Angeles against four Orange County school districts – Westminster, Santa Ana, Garden Grove, and El Modena (now eastern Orange) – on behalf of about 5,000 Hispanic-American schoolchildren. During the trial, the Westminster school board insisted that there was a "language issue"; however, their claim fell apart when one of the children was asked to testify. She testified in a highly articulate English – thus demonstrating that there was no "language issue", because most of the Hispanic-American children spoke English and had the same capacity for learning as their white Anglo counterparts.

On February 18, 1946, Judge Paul J. McCormick ruled in favor of Méndez and his co-plaintiffs. However, the school district appealed. Several organizations joined the appellate case as amicus curiae, including the ACLU, American Jewish Congress, Japanese American Citizens League and the NAACP, the latter of which was represented by Thurgood Marshall. More than a year later, on April 14, 1947, the Ninth Circuit Court of Appeals affirmed the district court's ruling in favor of the Mexican-American families. After the ruling was upheld on appeal, then-Governor Earl Warren moved to desegregate all public schools and other public spaces as well.

== Aftermath ==
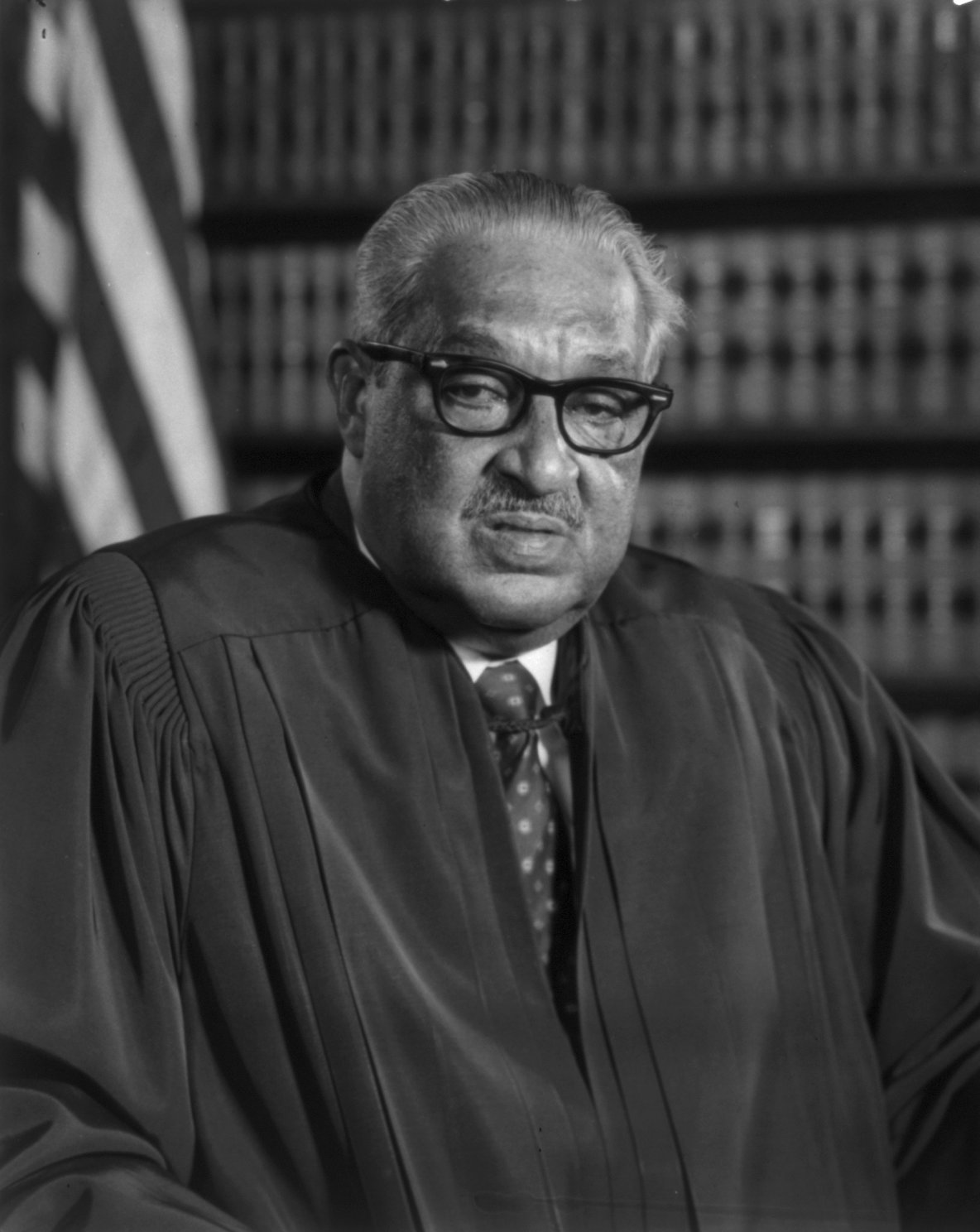
Thurgood Marshall

Méndez's children were finally allowed to attend the 17th Street Elementary school, thus becoming among the first Hispanics to attend an all-white school in California. However, the situation was not easy for their daughter Sylvia. Her white peers called her names and treated her poorly. She knew that she had to succeed after her parents fought for her to attend the school.

Mendez v. Westminster set a crucial precedent for ending segregation in the United States. Thurgood Marshall, who would later be appointed a U.S. Supreme Court justice in 1967, became the lead NAACP attorney in the 1954 Brown case. Marshall's amicus brief filed for Méndez on behalf of the NAACP contained the arguments that he later would use in the Brown case.

The Mendez case also deeply influenced the thinking of the California governor at the time, Earl Warren. This proved to be critical because, eight years later, in 1954, when the Brown case reached the U.S. Supreme Court, Earl Warren was its presiding member as the Chief Justice, and Thurgood Marshall argued the case before him.

== Legacy ==
Gonzalo Méndez died in 1964 at the age of 51, after Brown v. Board of Education was won nationally, but not yet well recognized for the enormous long-term impact that Mendez v. Westminster would ultimately have on the U.S.

On Sunday, April 12, 1998, Felicitas Méndez died of heart failure at her daughter's home in Fullerton, California. She was buried at Rose Hills Memorial Park in Whittier, California. She is survived by four sons: Victor, Gonzalo, Jerome and Phillip; two daughters, Sylvia Méndez and Sandra Durán; 21 grandchildren and 13 great-grandchildren.

The success of the Mendez v. Westminster case made California the first state in the nation to end segregation in school. This paved the way for the better-known Brown v. Board of Education seven years later, which would bring an end to school segregation in the entire country.

Sandra Robbie wrote and produced the documentary Mendez v. Westminster: For all the Children / Para Todos los Niños, which debuted on KOCE-TV in Orange County on September 24, 2002 as part of their Hispanic Heritage Month celebration. The documentary, which also aired on PBS, won an Emmy award and a Golden Mike Award.

A ribbon-cutting ceremony was held in the Los Angeles County Law Library for the opening of a new exhibit in the law library display case titled "Mendez to Brown: A Celebration." The exhibit features photos from both the Mendez and Brown cases, in addition to original documents. In 1998, the district of Santa Ana, California honored the Méndez family by naming a new school the "Gonzalo and Felicitas Mendez Fundamental Intermediate School".

In 2004, Sylvia Méndez was invited to the White House for the celebration of National Hispanic Heritage Month. She met with President George W. Bush, who shared her story with key Democrats, including U.S. Senator Hillary Clinton of New York.

On April 14, 2007, the U.S. Postal Service unveiled a stamp commemorating the Mendez v. Westminster case. The unveiling took place during an event at Chapman University School of Education, Orange County, California commemorating the 60th anniversary of the landmark case.

On September 9, 2009, a second namesake school opened in Boyle Heights, Los Angeles. The "Felicitas and Gonzalo Mendez Learning Center" is a dual school campus commemorating the efforts of the Méndez and other families from the Westminster case.

In September 2011, an exhibit honoring the Mendez v. Westminster case was presented at the Old Courthouse Museum in Santa Ana. This exhibit, known as "A Class Act", is sponsored by the Museum of Teaching and Learning. Sylvia Méndez was a member of the exhibit planning committee, along with her brother, Gonzalo.

Sylvia Méndez retired after working for thirty years as a nurse. She travels and lectures on the historic contributions of her parents and their co-plaintiffs to desegregate the United States. On February 15, 2011, President Obama awarded her the Presidential Medal of Freedom. In 2012, Brooklyn College awarded her an honorary degree.

On September 15, 2020, to kick off Hispanic Heritage Month, Google honored Felicitas Méndez with a doodle.

== See also ==
- List of Puerto Ricans
- List of Puerto Rican Presidential Medal of Freedom recipients
- History of women in Puerto Rico
- Felicitas and Gonzalo Mendez High School
- School segregation in California
