= Juan De Dios Gonzalez =

Mexican American farm labor organizer

Juan de Dios Gonzalez
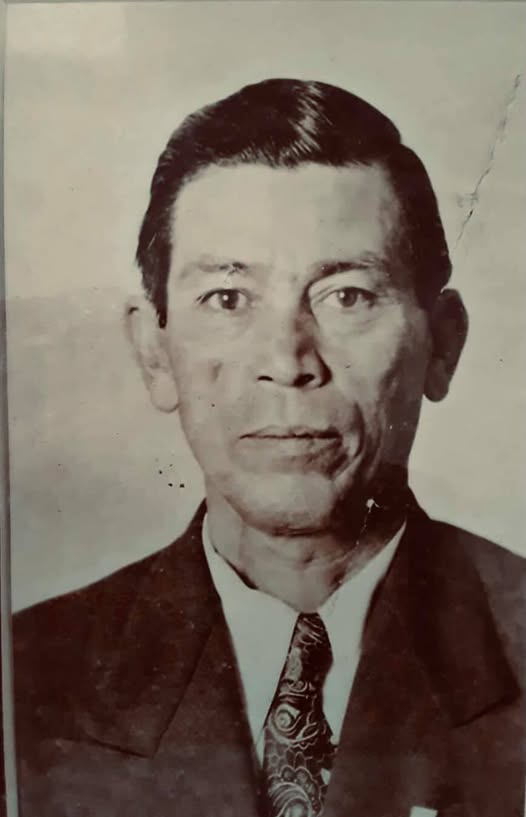
- Born: March 8th 1894; Jerez, Zacatecas, Mexico
- Died: March 23rd 1962; San Diego, California
- Occupations: Labor Organizer, Civil Rights Activist, Soldier
- Organization(s): El Comité de Vecinos de Lemon Grove, Union Mexicana de Obreros y Campesinos Del Condado de SD Cal
- Known for: The leader of the successful Lemon Grove School Boycott and lawsuit of 1931
- Spouse: Cruz Romero (married 1916 - 1962)
- Children: 14 In Total: Arturo, Jesus, Frank, Maria Elisa, Juan, Jose Alberto, Sofia Erminia, Manuel, Genaro, Julia, Artemisa, Roberto, Luis, and Henry
- Parents: Alberto Gonzalez (father); Juliana Escobedo (mother)

Juan De Dios Gonzalez (March 8, 1894 - March 23, 1962) was a Mexican American farm labor organizer, and the organizer of the school boycott famously known as The Lemon Grove Incident that in 1931 lead to the first major successful school desegregation case in the United States (Roberto Alvarez vs. the board of trustees of the Lemon Grove School District). The Gonzalez family was for a time one of the largest and most politically active families in San Diego County.

== Early life ==
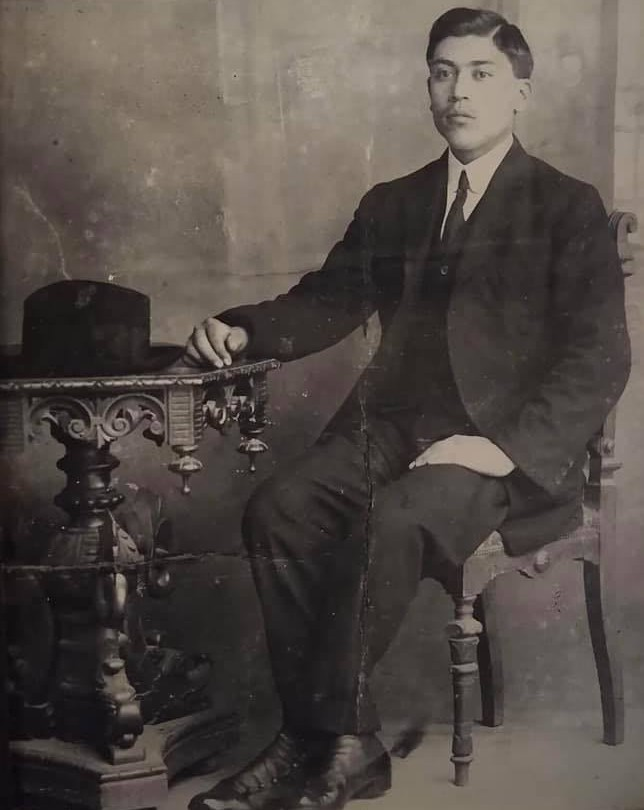
Juan de Dios age 16

Juan De Dios Gonzalez was born on March 8, 1894 in Zacatecas, Mexico to parents Alberto Gonzalez and Juliana Escobedo. Gonzalez was well educated at a military school while living in Zacatecas, and went on to serve as secretary under Pancho Villa during the Mexican Revolution. Gonzalez was wounded for the third time during the Revolution and ended up in Nogales, Arizona where he met his wife Cruz Romero in 1916, and they were married the same year.

In the 1920s Gonzalez was a laborer, picking cotton in Arizona, building the railroad, working as a cook, working in a quarry, taking deliveries to mining towns, and eventually picking fruit in California and organizing farm laborers. Gonzalez and his family moved to Lemon Grove, CA in 1922 and began working in the thriving citrus industry. By the early 1930s Gonzalez and his wife had 9 children, so Mr Gonzalez would also take odd jobs to support his large family.

== School Boycott and Court Case ==
On January 5, 1931, the Lemon Grove school district prevented 75 children of Mexican descent, including four of Gonzalez's children, from entering the school they had been attending in Lemon Grove. The school council had decided that all children of Mexican descent would now need to attend classes across town at a poorly constructed building resembling a barn that became referred to as "la caballeriza" (the stable), with only 2 teachers assigned to teach 4 grades each per room. At a time of major discrimination, anti-Mexican sentiment, and threats of deportation even for born citizens, the parents argued about what the best course of action was. Throughout the south west, students of Mexican descent were being segretated into separate "Americanization" schools. Gonzalez, having been a farm labor organizer, decided to organize a boycott of the new school, going door to door getting the word out not to attend the segregated school. He successfully rallied the parents into a neighborhood committee called El Comité de Vecinos de Lemon Grove, to fight the unjust segregation of their children.

In addition to organizing the boycott, Gonzalez scheduled meetings and launched a formal complaint with the Mexican consulate, and contacted lawyer Fred Noon, a regular advisor of his that he had previously met in Nogales Arizona. They chose Roberto Alvarez as the primary plaintiff against the Lemon Grove School District, as he spoke the best english, had good grades and therefore could prove that the segregated students weren't all deficient in the english language, nor did they need to become Americanized, especially as the majority had been born in the US. The common sentiment at the time from the proponents for segregation was that children of Mexican descent were inferior, and the segregation of children of Mexican descent was becoming an increasingly acceptable practice at that time. Gonzalez was the petitioner of the writ of mandate against the Board of Trustees of Lemon Grove School District in San Diego County, on behalf of Alvarez and the other 74 children barred from entry into the Lemon Grove School, and was also appointed Guardian ad Litem of Alvarez. On March 30, 1931 in a historic decision, Roberto Alvarez vs. the board of trustees of the Lemon Grove School District was decided in favor of Alvarez, becoming the first successful school desegregation case in the United States involving multiple children; twenty-three years prior to Brown vs Board of Education, and sixteen years prior to Mendez v Westminster. Gonzalez's work ethic, education, ability to organize and the connections he had made earlier helped ensure the successful outcome of the historical case.

== Legacy and Death ==
=== Activism Legacy ===
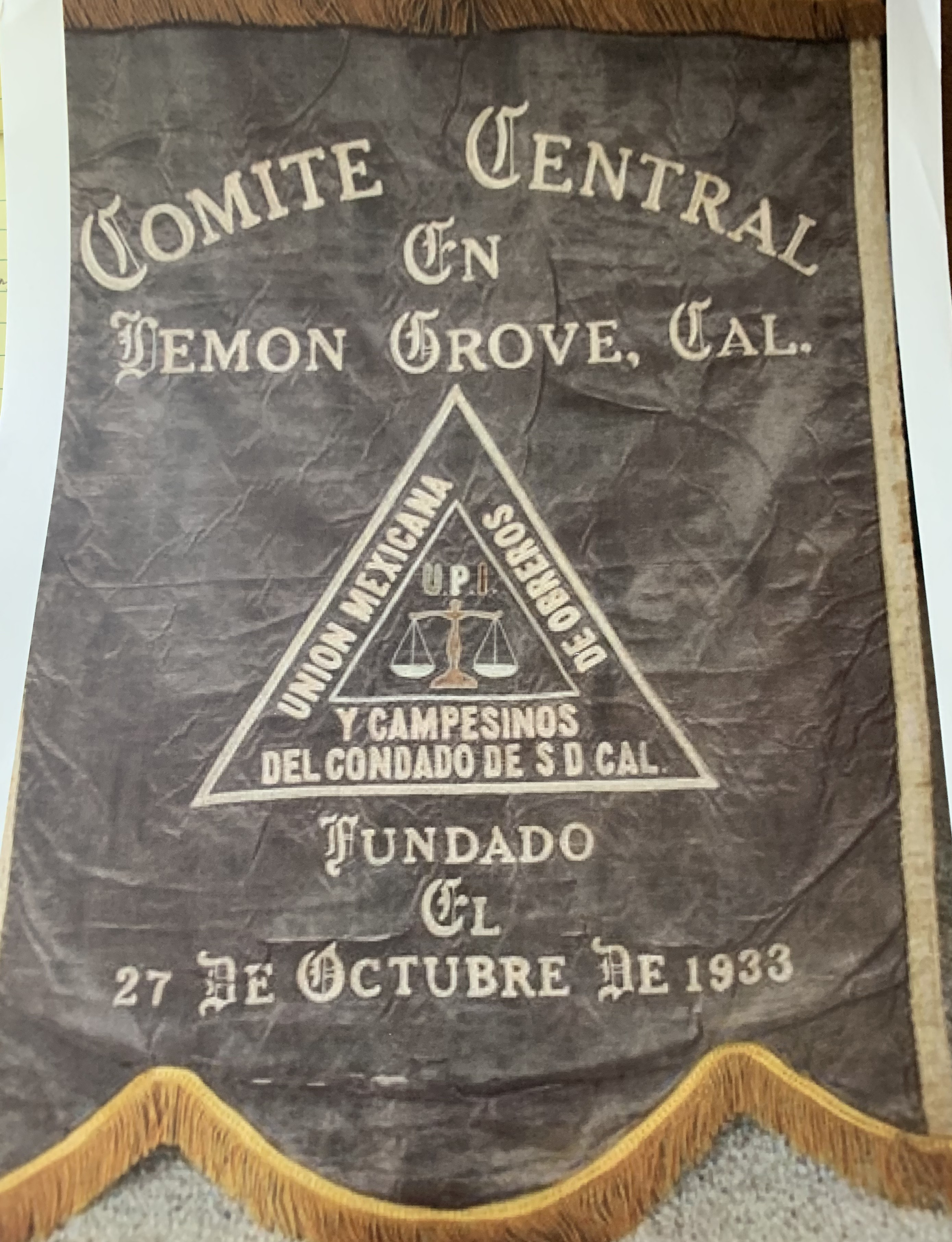
La Bandera de Union Mexicana De Obreros Y Campensinos

The Gonzalez family moved to Logan Heights in 1934. During a time when employers were violently preventing unions from forming and workers who unionized had no legal protections until the later passage of the National Labor Relations Act of 1935, Mr Gonzalez became the leader of one of the first labor unions in San Diego, the Union de Obreros y Campesinos (Union of Workers and Peasants) founded in 1933, and led numerous strikes throughout southern california.

The bravery of Mr Gonzalez during a time of anti-Mexican sentiment, and the hard fought outcome of the Lemon Grove School Boycott and court battle, as well as his labor victories, helped to inspire those who came after him. Many of Gonzalez's children and grandchildren followed in his footsteps, becoming civil rights activists themselves. His daughter Sofia Erminia “Minnie” Ybarra founded and directed the UFW-Affiliated Martin Luther King Jr. Farm Worker Service Center in San Ysidro in the 1970s, Many of his grandchildren became activists as well: Alberto Ybarra and Richard Ybarra participated in both the Coachella and Delano grape strikes, David Villarino and Daniel Ybarra participated in the Boston UFW Boycotts, and Samuel Ybarra in the San Diego Boycott. Both Richard and David were personal assistants, organizers and heads of security to Cesar Chavez, and each married one of his daughters. In addition, grandchildren Anita Gonzales Hernandez volunteered with the farmworker initiative, Patricia Gonzalez Egypto volunteered with the farmworkers credit union, and Manuel Gonzales Jr volunteered doing construction projects for the movement.

=== Military Legacy ===
Following the United States officially entering World War II, Mr Gonzalez, a veteran of the Mexican Revolution, registered for the draft at age 48, however only men 18-45 were actually drafted. So he assisted locally, volunteering with the Civil Defense as an Air Raid Warden. Although Juan de Dios did not serve during World War II, four of his sons, Arturo, Jesus, Juan, and Jose Alberto did. Following in the steps of their father, 9 of Gonzalez’s 10 sons served in the U.S. Military, the 10th passing away before coming of age to serve.

=== Death ===
Juan De Dios Gonzales died on Friday March 23, 1962 of Tuberculosis at the age of 68.

=== In popular culture ===
Juan De Dios Gonzalez was portrayed in the award winning PBS Docudrama The Lemon Grove Incident, produced by Paul Espinoza, by actor Guillermo Gomez-Peña.

Mr Gonzalez is also depicted in the center of a mural about the Lemon Grove Incident done by artist Mario Chacon, in Lemon Grove CA, among other parents and students.
