= Lemon Grove Middle School =

Coordinates: 32°44′20″N 117°01′43″W

Lemon Grove Academy Middle School
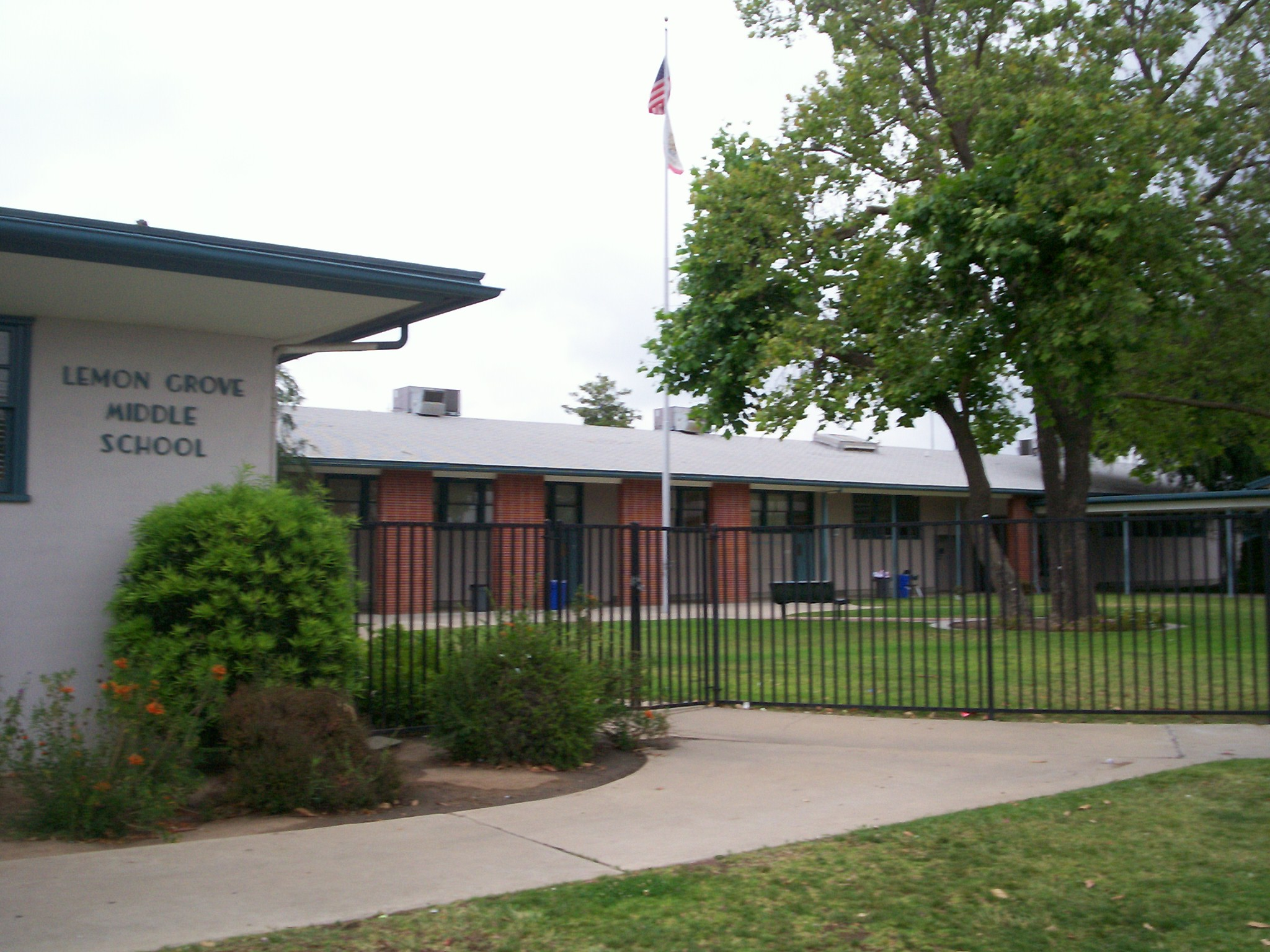

Location
- 7866 Lincoln Street; Lemon Grove, California 91945; United States

Information
- Type: Middle School
- Established: 1966
- School district: Lemon Grove School District
- Grades: 7-8
- Colors: Green and Grey
- Mascot: Wolf

Lemon Grove Academy Middle School is a middle school in Lemon Grove, California. The school is managed by the Lemon Grove School District. Lemon Grove Academy Middle's mascot is the Wolf.

== New promotion requirements ==
New requirements were adapted June 2008. To graduate from 8th grade, students have to earn 2.0 GPA in both citizenship and academic grades. In 2008 students were able to graduate with a 1.5 GPA.

== Auditorium Dedicated To Desegregation Pioneer ==
In 1931, Lemon Grove Grammar School principal Jerome Green, acting under instructions from school trustees, turned away Mexican children at the schoolhouse door and ordered them to the Mexican only school/barn. Some of the Mexican children turned away spoke English only and not Spanish. The landmark lawsuit resulting from the "Lemon Grove Incident" became the first successful school desegregation court decision in the history of the United States.

On March 7, 2007, the Lemon Grove Middle School auditorium, which is on the site of the former grammar school, was dedicated in the honor of Roberto Alvarez, the lead plaintiff in the court case.
