= Felicitas and Gonzalo Mendez High School =

Location
- 1200 Plaza Del Sol; Los Angeles, Los Angeles, California 90033; United States; 34.048395°N 118.226994°W

Information
- Type: Public
- Opened: September 2009
- School district: Los Angeles Unified School District
- Principal: none
- Teaching staff: 51.28 (FTE)
- Grades: 9-12
- Student to teacher ratio: 15.19
- Colors: Navy, White & Light Blue
- Athletics conference: Central League; CIF Los Angeles City Section
- Mascot: Jaguar
- Website: mendezhs.lausd.org

Felicitas and Gonzalo Mendez High School is a public high school in the Boyle Heights neighborhood of Los Angeles, California, United States. It is also known as Felicitas and Gonzalo Mendez Learning Center.

== History ==
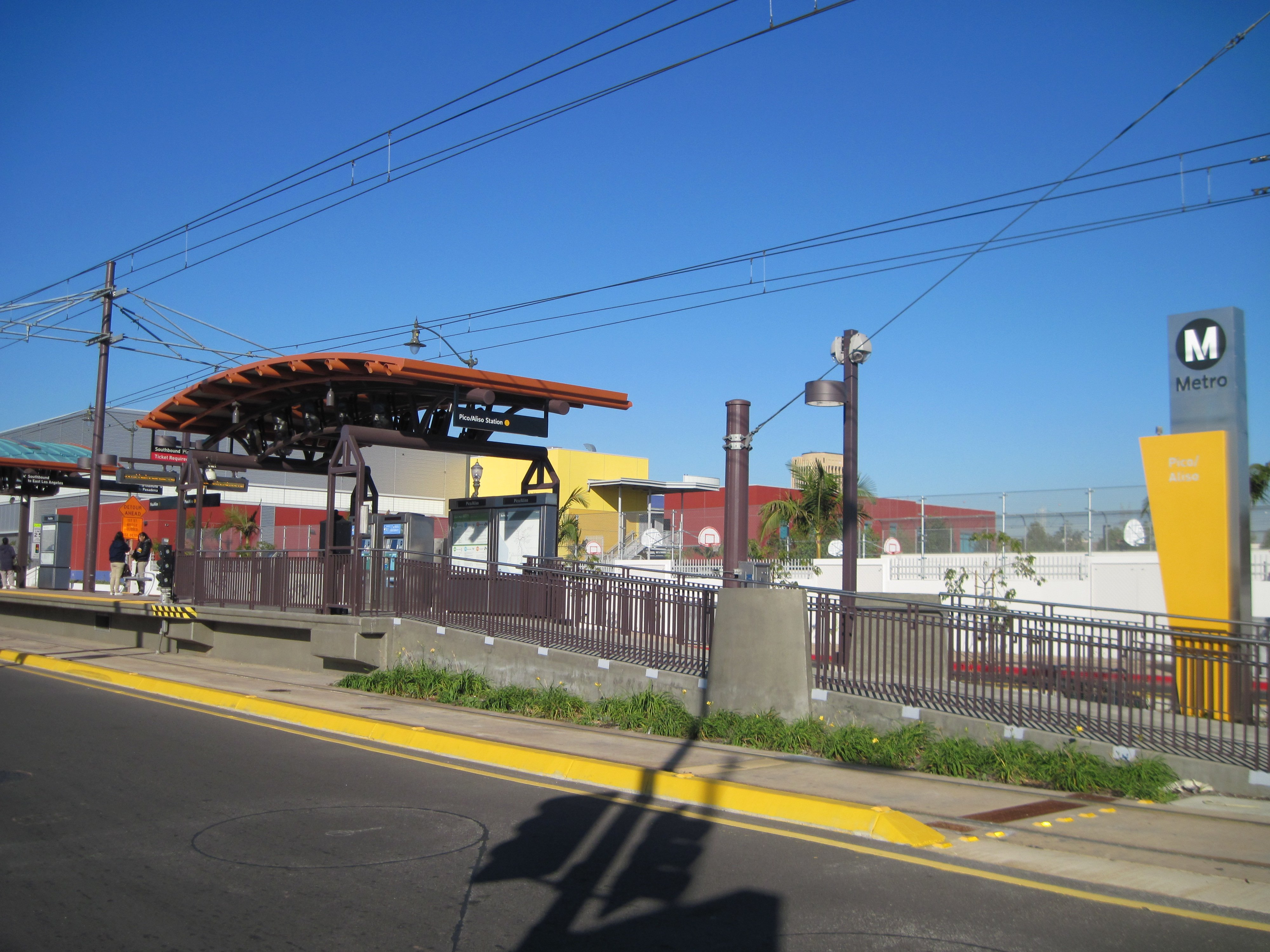
Felicitas and Gonzalo Mendez High School is shown behind the Pico-Aliso Station of the Gold Line on First Street

The school is named after Felicitas and Gonzalo Mendez, parents of American civil rights activist Sylvia Mendez who at eight years old, played an instrumental role in the Mendez v. Westminster case, the landmark desegregation case of 1946. The case successfully ended de jure segregation in California.

It was the first high school to open in Boyle Heights in 28 years.

== Campus ==
The school was built to alleviate the overcrowded Roosevelt High School. The site was designated in 2003, broke ground in 2006, and the campus opened in September 2009. It is built on 6.22 acres (2.52 ha).

The building occupies 109,378 square feet (10,161.5 m^{2}) and contains 38 classrooms. It was designed by Nadel Architects and Barrio Planners and was built by Hensel Phelps Construction at a cost of $108 million. The site attained a Collaborative for High Performance Schools score of 24.

== Rankings ==
Demographics of student body
Ethnic Breakdown	2021
American Indian/Alaskan Native	0%
Hispanic and Latino American	98%
Black	1%
Asian American	1%
Native Hawaiian or other Pacific Islander	0%
White	1%
Multiracial Americans	0.1%
Female	47%
Male	53%

US News 2021 Rankings

- 54 in Los Angeles Unified School District High Schools
- 246 in Los Angeles metropolitan area High Schools
- 581 in California High Schools
- 3,827 in National Rankins

US News 2020 Rankings

- 88 in Los Angeles Unified School District High Schools
- 218 in Los Angeles metropolitan area High Schools
- 501 in California High Schools
- 3,338 in National Rankins
