= Mendez v. Westminster =

1947 US appeals court case

- Court: United States Court of Appeals for the Ninth Circuit
- Full case name: Mendez et al. v. Westminster School Dist. of Orange County et al.
- Argued: February 18, 1946
- Decided: April 14, 1947
- Citation: 161 F.2d 774 (9th Cir. 1947)

Case history
- Prior history: 64 F.Supp. 544 (C.D. Cal. 1946)

Holding
- The segregation of Mexican Americans in public schools was unconstitutional because it violated the 14 Amendment

Court membership
- Judges sitting: Paul J. McCormick, Leon R. Yankwich, Elbert P. Tuttle

Case opinions
- Dissent: There was no dissent as the ruling was unanimous.

Laws applied
- U.S. Const. amend. XIV; Section 1 of Article IX of the Constitution of California; Cal. Ed. Code §§ 8002-8004, 8251, 8501, 10051, 16004, 16005

Mendez, et al v. Westminster School District of Orange County, et al, 64 F.Supp. 544 (S.D. Cal. 1946), aff'd, 161 F.2d 774 (9th Cir. 1947) (en banc), was a 1947 federal court case that challenged Mexican remedial schools in four districts in Orange County, California. In its ruling, the United States Court of Appeals for the Ninth Circuit, in an en banc decision, held that the forced segregation of Mexican American students into separate "Mexican schools" was unconstitutional because as US District Court Judge Paul J. McCormick stated, "The evidence clearly shows that Spanish-speaking children are retarded in learning English by lack of exposure to its use because of segregation, and that commingling of the entire student body instills and develops a common cultural attitude among the school children which is imperative for the perpetuation of American institutions and ideals."

== Background ==
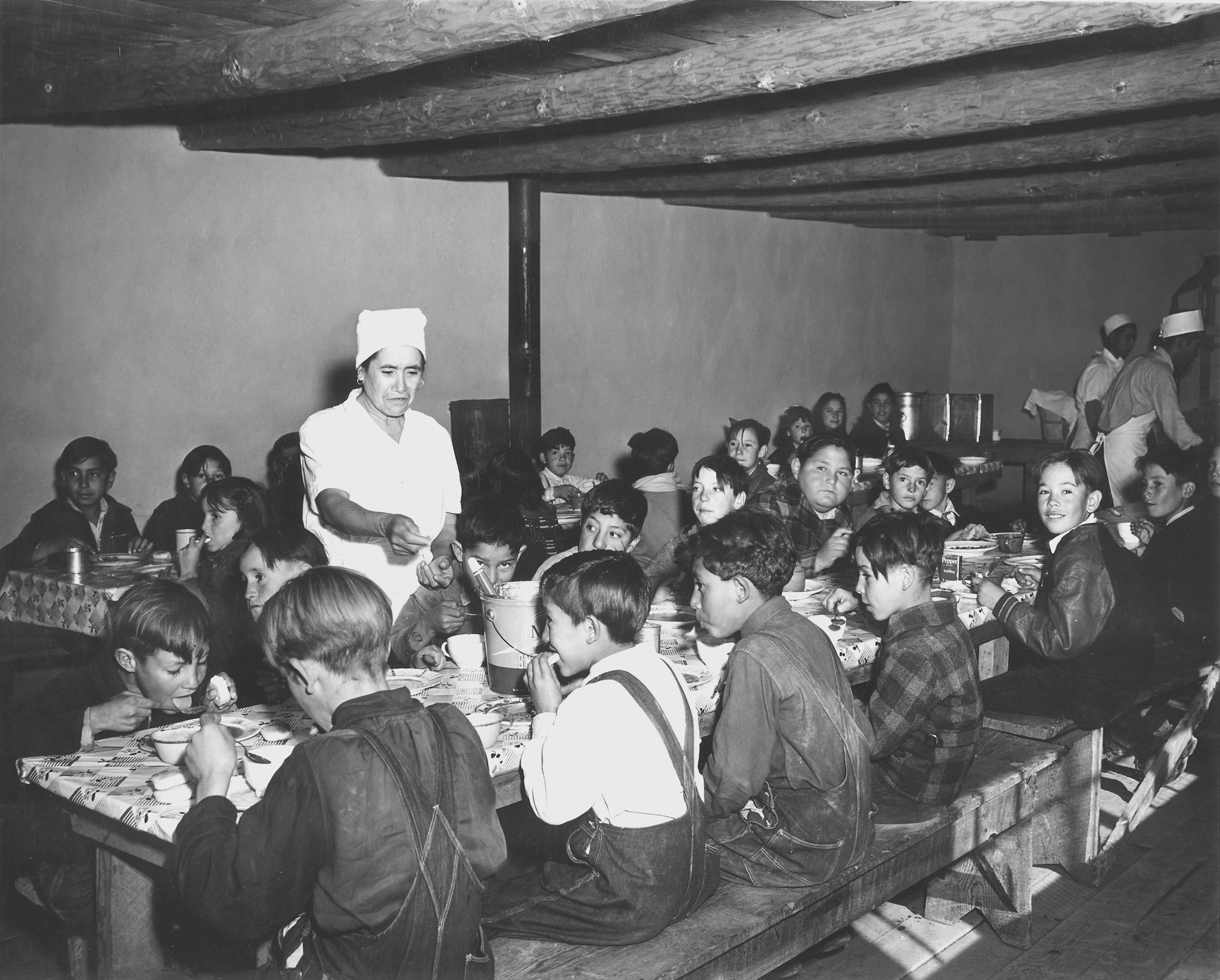
Mexican American school children in the 1940s

Mexican Americans, who were historically considered to be white, were unaffected by legal segregation and normally attended segregated white schools in California. The Mendez family, who previously went to white schools without problems, suddenly found their children forced into separate "Schools for Mexicans" when they came to Westminster, even though that was not the norm and it was not legally sanctioned by the state. Starting in the 1940s, some school districts began to establish separate language-based remedial education, arguing that Mexican children had special needs because they were Spanish speakers. The schools existed only for elementary children (K-4) and were intended to prepare them for mainstream English-speaking schools with Anglo-American children. But since many districts began arbitrarily forcing Mexican elementary school children into "Mexican Schools" irrespective of language ability, it became a form of unlawful discrimination that was superficially similar to legalized racial segregation.

Five Mexican American fathers (Thomas Estrada, William Guzman, Gonzalo Mendez, Frank Palomino, and Lorenzo Ramirez) challenged the practice of Mexican school segregation in the United States District Court for the Central District of California, in Los Angeles. They claimed that their children, along with 5,000 other children of "Mexican" ancestry, were victims of unconstitutional discrimination by being forced to attend separate "schools for Mexicans" in the Westminster, Garden Grove, Santa Ana, and El Modena school districts of Orange County. Mexicans were not in separate schools elsewhere in California.

Soledad Vidaurri went to the Westminster Elementary School District to enroll her children and those of her brother Gonzalo Mendez: Gonzalo, Geronimo, and Sylvia. The Westminster School informed Vidaurri that her children could be admitted to the school. However, Gonzalo, Geronimo, and Sylvia could not be admitted on the basis of their skin color. (Vidaurri's children had light complexions and Basque surnames and so would not be segregated into a different school.) Upon hearing the news, Vidaurri refused to admit her children to the school if her brother's children were not admitted as well. The parents, Gonzalo and Felicitas Mendez, tried to arrange for Geronimo, Gonzalo, and Sylvia to attend the school by talking to the school administration, but the parties were not able to reach an agreement.

Gonzalo Mendez dedicated time to organizing affected parents to challenge segregation in the Westminster School District of Orange County by persuading the school board to put forth a proposal for a new integrated school. The parents asked that all students of Mexican descent be allowed to transfer out of the "Mexican" schools if they wished. The board refused their requests and, in turn, lowered the amount of available transfer tokens. With no remedy, the group proceeded to take legal action.

Gonzalo Mendez and William Guzman brought the case to the court as individuals with no counsel before hiring Los Angeles civil rights lawyer David Marcus. Marcus expanded the case and filed a class action suit against four Orange County school districts: Westminster, Santa Ana, Garden Grove, and El Modena (Orange). He argued that the segregation of Mexican and Latin descent children violated the rights granted by the Fifth and Fourteenth Amendments. Meanwhile, the defendant districts were represented by Orange County counsel Joel Ogle, who argued that federal courts had no jurisdiction as the case was a matter of state law and the provision of educational standards not based on race or nationality.

Senior District Judge Paul J. McCormick, sitting in Los Angeles, presided at the trial and ruled in favor of Mendez and his co-plaintiffs on February 18, 1946 in finding that separate schools for Mexicans to be an unconstitutional denial of due process. The school district appealed to the Ninth Federal Circuit Court of Appeals in San Francisco, which upheld Judge McCormick's decision, finding that the segregation practices violated the Fourteenth Amendment. Although the case was a victory for the families affected, it was narrowly focused on the small number of Mexican remedial schools in Orange County and did not challenge legal segregation in California or elsewhere. Mendez was not framed as a racial equality case; rather, it centered on the fact that Mexicans were white and the segregation was not legal. The decision preserved legal segregation for non-white minorities.

== Aftermath ==
Several organizations joined the appellate case as amicus curiae, including the NAACP, represented by Thurgood Marshall and Robert L. Carter and the Japanese American Citizens League (JACL). More than a year later, on April 14, 1947, the United States Court of Appeals for the Ninth Circuit affirmed the district court's ruling but not on equal protection grounds. It did not challenge the "separate but equal" interpretation of the Fourteenth Amendment that had been announced by the Supreme Court in Plessy v. Ferguson in 1896. Instead, the Ninth Circuit held that the segregation was not racially based, but it had been implemented by the school districts without being specifically authorized by state law, and it was thus impermissible irrespective of Plessy v Ferguson.

Governor Earl Warren, who would later become Chief Justice of the United States, signed the Anderson Bill in 1947 outlawing segregation for Native Americans and Asians. But its relation to Mendez is disputed. There is no documented link between the Mendez case and the Anderson Bill, which doesn't cite Mendez in its text or legislative record. Some historians and popular narratives infer that it was "influenced" by the Mendez decision simply because it was signed by Warren two months after. But the California state legislature acted on the bill before the Mendez appeals court decision.

A working paper published by the National Bureau of Economic Research by Francisca M. Antman and Kalena Cortes, illustrates that Mexican American students who started schooling after the case went into effect were in school an average of 0.9 years longer, and were 19.4% more likely to graduate high school than those students who started schooling pre-Mendez. The author speculates that this change in education attainment was caused by the Mendez decision, suggesting the decision in the case of Mendez v. Westminster may have made a positive change statewide.

== Disputed Link to Brown v. Board ==
Many popular narratives such as the 2002 documentary Mendez v. Westminster: For All the Children credit Mendez as the "blueprint" or "foundation" for Brown v. Board of Education, but contemporary legal actors did not think so in the time period.

George L. Sanchez, pioneering Mexican-American educational scholar who served as an expert witness in the case, was asked if the Mendez decision could have any influence on Brown v. Board of Education, and he exclaimed "No, there could be no connection!". Unlike Brown, Mendez never sought to challenge legal segregation in itself. The overriding issue in Mendez was that Mexicans were white children who were being arbitrarily segregated from other whites in the absence of any state or federal law due to the language barrier. "Does the present case attack Negro segregation where there is no law decreeing such segregation? Only in such a case would we be concerned." Since segregation for African-American children was legal, that was not of their concern in Mendez, and made the cases ultimately unrelated.

Robert L. Carter who contributed an amicus brief to test the NAACP's segregation 'per se' argument (which was first established in the 1931 Margold Report) later lamented that he and Thurgood Marshall considered the decision to be a legal failure and a threat to the organization's national goals. By centering the white racial status of Mexicans and the absence of state law, the decision reinforced legal segregation for minorities. In his 2005 Memoir Carter states, "The court's decision in the Mendez case was regressive. By ruling that the segregation was illegal only because it was not authorized by California law, the court was implicitly holding that segregation was valid when authorized by state law. This was the very principle we were trying to overturn." Calling the decision 'regressive', Carter and Marshall deliberately did not cite or mention Mendez in Brown v. Board of ed because they could not rely on it.

== Legacy ==
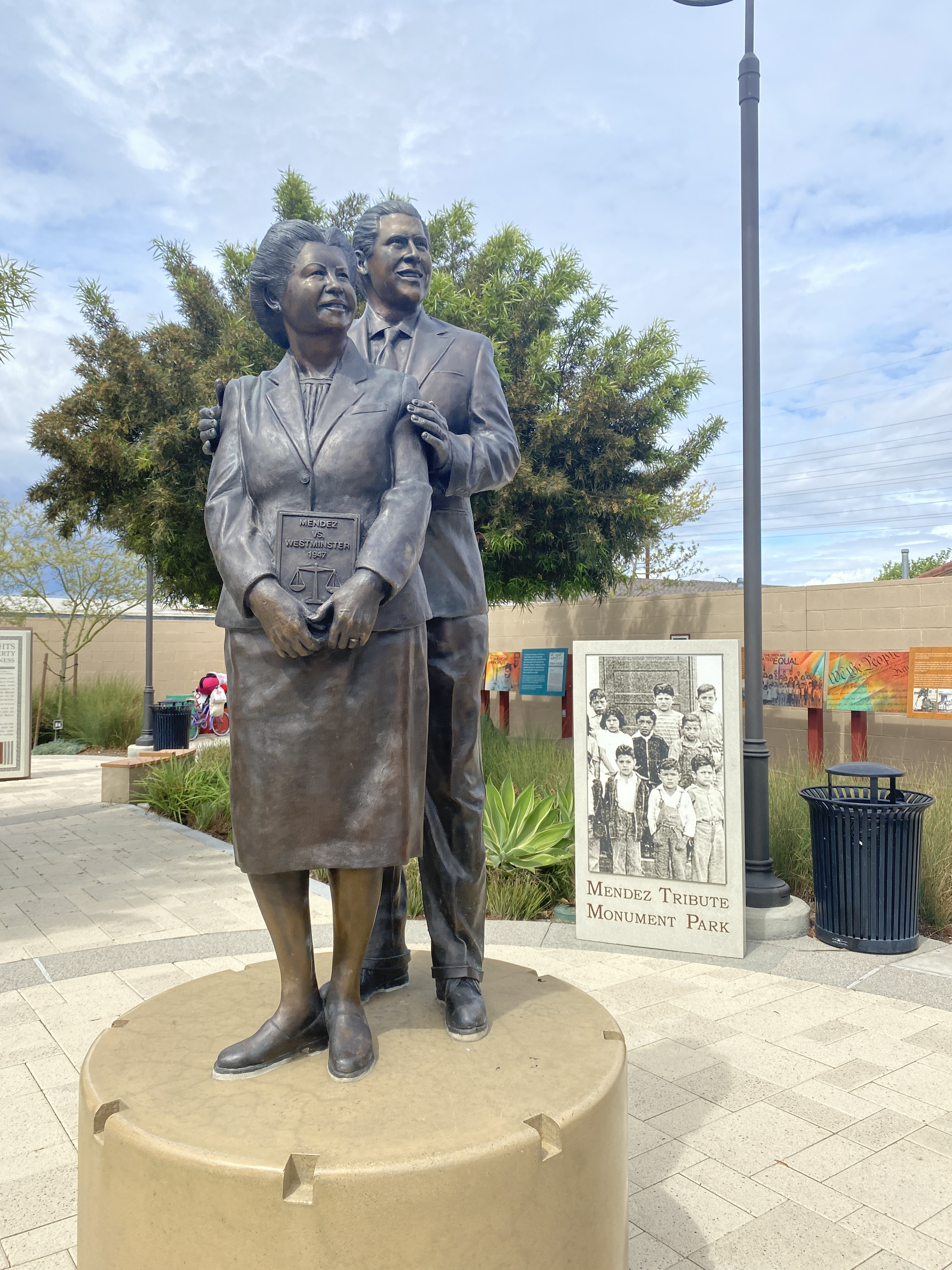
Statue of Gonzalo and Felicitas Mendez at Mendez Tribute Monument Park in Westminster, California

On December 8, 1997, the Santa Ana Unified School District dedicated the Gonzalo and Felicitas Mendez Intermediate Fundamental School in Santa Ana, California.

In 2003, writer/producer Sandra Robbie received an Emmy Award for her documentary Mendez vs. Westminster: For All the Children / Para Todos los Niños.

On September 14, 2007, the US Postal Service honored the 60th anniversary of the ruling with a 41-cent commemorative stamp. On November 15, 2007, it presented the Mendez v. Westminster stamp to the Mendez family, at a press conference at the Rose Center Theater in Westminster, California.

In September 2009, Felicitas and Gonzalo Mendez High School opened in Boyle Heights. The school was named after Felicitas and Gonzalo Mendez, parents of American civil rights activist Sylvia Mendez, who played an instrumental role in the case.

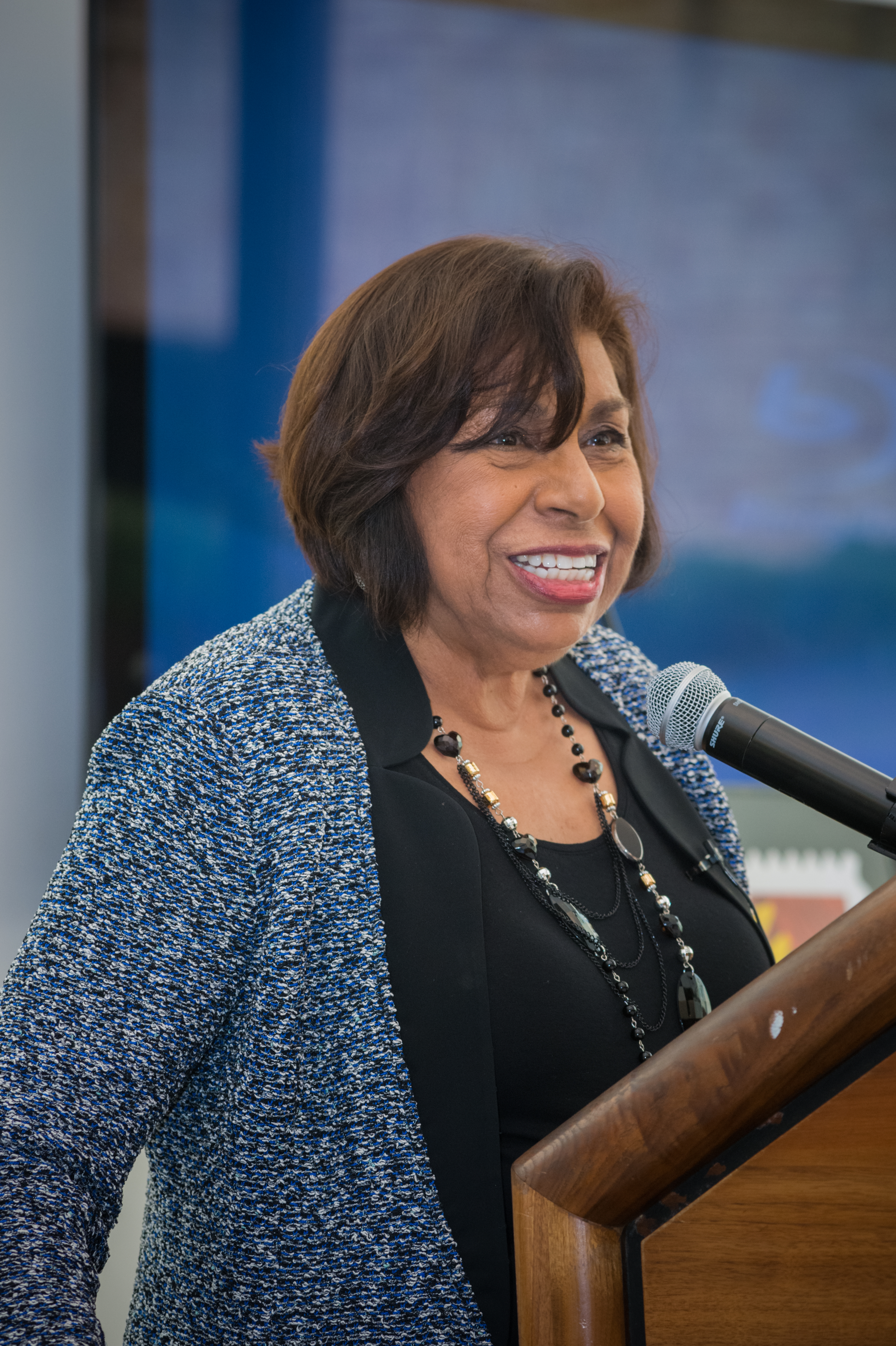
Sylvia Mendez at the, “In Conversation with… Education for All – The Sylvia Mendez Story” in 2014.

On October 14, 2009, Chapman University's Leatherby Libraries dedicated the Mendez et al v. Westminster et al Group Study Room and a collection of documents, video and other items relating to the landmark desegregation case. Chapman also owns the last standing Mexican school building from the segregation era in Orange County.

On February 15, 2011, President Barack Obama awarded the Presidential Medal of Freedom to Sylvia Mendez, the daughter of Gonzalo Mendez, the lead plaintiff in the lawsuit. She, along with her two brothers, Gonzalo, Jr. and Jerome, were some of the Mexican-American students who were denied admission to their local Westminster school, which formed the basis for the suit. Sylvia was awarded the honor for her many years of work encouraging students to stay in school and to ensure that the importance of Mendez v. Westminster in American history will not be forgotten.

In September 2011, the Museum of Teaching and Learning (MOTAL), in partnership with a half-dozen government agencies and universities, opened a nine-month exhibition about the case at the Old Orange County Courthouse in Santa Ana, California. The exhibition, for which the team won a 2013 Award of Merit from the American Association for State and Local History, continues to travel to other locations to educate the public, both adults and students, about the details around this landmark case.

== See also ==
- League of United Latin American Citizens
- Gebhart v. Belton
- Tape v. Hurley
- Lemon Grove Incident
- Parents v. Seattle
- Hernandez v. Texas
- Del Rio ISD v. Salvatierra
- Maestas vs. George H. Shone
- Brown v. Board of Education
- School segregation in California
- History of education in California#Latinos

== Sources ==
1. The reported opinions of Judge McCormick and the Ninth Circuit, Mendez v. Westminster [sic] School Dist. of Orange County, 64 F.Supp. 544 (S.D. Cal. 1946), aff'd, 161 F.2d 774 (9th Cir. 1947) (en banc).
2. "Mendez v. Westminster, 1945-1947," Greenwood (2018), David-James Gonzales, in Lilia Fernandez ed., 50 Events That Shaped Latino History: An America Mosaic., 2 vols. An overview of the grassroots movement that led to the Mendez et al. case with biographies of notable figures and a before and after chronology.
3. All Deliberate Speed UC Press (1976), Charles Wollenberg. Each chapter provides a detailed history of the various non-white ethnic groups and their educational struggles in California.
4. "Knocking on the Schoolhouse Door" 8 La Raza Law Journal 166 (1995), Christopher Arriola. A look at one town involved in the lawsuit, El Modena, and an examination of the appellate briefs used in the case.
5. Chicano Education in the Era of Segregation UCI Press, (1992) Gilbert Gonzalez. A sociological history of Mexican School Segregation in the Southwest.
6. The Devil in Silicon Valley: Northern California, Race, and Mexican Americans Princeton University Press (2004) Stephen J. Pitti. A look at the history of Chicanos in San Jose, CA.
7. The Barrios of Santa Ana Dissertation published by the University of Michigan Press (1985), Mary Lisbeth Haas. A complete history of the Mexican Community in Santa Ana, CA, up to 1948.
8. "Chicanos in California" Materials for Today's Learning (1990), Albert Camarillo. A short, concise history of Chicanos in California.
9. David S. Ettinger, The History of School Desegregation in the Ninth Circuit, 12 Loyola of Los Angeles Law Review 481, 484–487 (1979)
10. "The Mexican American Struggle for Equal Educational Opportunity in Mendez v. Westminster: Helping to Pave the Way for Brown v. The Board of Education". Richard Valencia, Teacher's College Record, Vol. 107, Number 3, March 2005, p 389.
11. Philippa Strum, Mendez v. Westminster : school desegregation and Mexican-American rights, Lawrence, Kan., University Press of Kansas, c2010.
12. Sandra Robbie, Mendez vs. Westminster: For All the Children / Para Todos los Ninos. A Sandra Robbie production, c2002.
13. David-James Gonzales, Breaking Down the Walls of Segregation: Mexican American Grassroots Politics and Civil Rights in Orange County, California, New York, NY., Oxford University Press, 2025.
14. Mark Brilliant, The Color of America Has Changed: How Racial Diversity Shaped Civil Rights Reform in California, 1941-1978, New York, NY., Oxford University Press, 2012.
