= Lemon Grove Incident =

School desegregation case

Roberto Alvarez vs. the Board of Trustees of the Lemon Grove School District
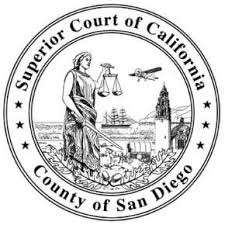
- Court: San Diego Superior Court
- Full case name: Roberto Alvarez vs. the Board of Trustees of the Lemon Grove School District
- Started: February 24, 1931
- Decided: March 31, 1931

Ruling
- The school board could separate a few children to offer special instruction, but to separate all the Mexicans in one group can only be done by infringing the laws of the State of California.

Court membership
- Judge sitting: Judge Claude Chambers

The Lemon Grove Case (Roberto Alvarez vs. the board of trustees of the Lemon Grove School District), commonly known as the Lemon Grove Incident, was the United States' first successful school integration case. The incident occurred in 1930 and 1931 in Lemon Grove, California, where the local school board attempted to build a separate school for children of Mexican origin. On March 30, 1931, the San Diego County Superior Court ruled that the local school board's attempt to segregate 75 Mexican and Mexican American elementary school children was a violation of California state laws because ethnic Mexicans were considered White under the state's Education Code. The Lemon Grove Case is heralded as a victory over separatist educational practices and as a testimony to the Mexican immigrant parents who effectively utilized the U.S. legal system to protect their children's rights.

== Background ==
The segregation of Mexican and Mexican American children was common throughout the Southwest in the early-to-mid 1900s. While the California Education Code did not explicitly allow for the segregation of children of Mexican descent, approximately 80% of California school districts with substantial Mexican and Mexican American populations had separate classrooms or elementary schools for Spanish speaking students. It is not known how many Mexican children were in these remedial classes The other 20% of school districts maintained partial forms of segregation, such as segregated classrooms within mixed schools. School boards in cities such as Pasadena, Santa Ana, Riverside, and Los Angeles offered various rationales for such segregation. Many districts relied on linguistic arguments, claiming that segregation was necessary given English "language handicaps". Others cited the need to train Mexican and Mexican American youth for "appropriate" jobs. Several districts argued that "Americanization" schools were necessary to properly assimilate Mexican and Mexican American youth. Authorities often promised that Mexican and Mexican American youth could be integrated upon their mastery of the English language and their complete Americanization; yet these pledges almost always went unfulfilled. Records indicate that such "Mexican schools" had substandard facilities, shorter school years, and poorer quality of instruction. Furthermore, in the city of Lemon Grove itself there was a growing resentment against its Mexican population due to the sudden rise in growth rates for this particular demographic as well as the overall fear of the loss of white collar jobs from US citizens and giving them to Mexican Americans.

== Case background ==
In this context, the integrated grammar school of Lemon Grove was an anomaly. The Mexican and Mexican American students, children to the fifty-odd Mexican immigrant families from Baja California, accounted for about half of the school's 169 students. Furthermore, the student population found within the Lemon Grove School District was approximately 75 Mexican and Mexican American students and 95 white students. On July 23, 1930, the all-Anglo Lemon Grove school board decided to build a separate school for children of Mexican heritage without giving notice to their parents. The plan was discussed by the school board and subsequently endorsed by the Chamber of Commerce and local PTA. By August, the board felt that the "situation had reached emergency conditions" due to overcrowding and "sanitary and moral" issues stemming from the Mexican and Mexican American youth. In this plan to separate these students from their peers, the school board expected that "the Mexican community would docilely separate itself and send its children to the new school."

This "new school" where the students were to be separated was an old two room building that came to be known within the local Mexican American community as la caballeriza, meaning "the barn," on Olive Street. After an emergency meeting between the board was conducted on August 13, the Mexican and Mexican American students of the school were expelled and their school supplies/belongings and desks were later transferred to the building. On January 5, 1931, Lemon Grove Grammar School principal Jerome Green, acting under instructions from school trustees, turned away Mexican children at the schoolhouse door, directing them to the new school. In response, parents who were outraged at the response refused to send their children to the new school. Since they were not allowed back at the main schoolhouse, this resulted in a boycott led by organizer Juan De Dios Gonzalez. Through this boycott, 75 students remained at home and the local press took note of this protest, writing this in the headlines as "The Mexican Student Strike."

Despite their lack of representation in official channels of power such as the PTA or the Chamber of Commerce, the parents quickly created El Comité de Vecinos de Lemon Grove (the Lemon Grove Neighbors Committee). Parents would meet in the household of one of the families whose children were refused to be allowed in the school and would discuss plan on what was to be done against the separation of the Mexican students from the grammar school. Mr. Gonzalez sought the assistance of the Mexican consul in San Diego, Enrique Ferreira, who put them in touch with two attorneys. These two San Diego attorneys were Fred Noon and A. C. Brinkley. Gonzalez was a former associate of Noon, who worked in the city since 1928 and knew Spanish well enough in order to communicate with parents on how to file for the court case. The Comité also sought the support of the broader Mexican and Mexican American community on both sides of the border; the Mexican government also gave the parents and their organization full support as they protested against his decision made by the school board and the PTA. The community responded with both moral and financial support that allowed the Comité to cover the costs of the upcoming lawsuit. Other responses from the community included the support of Mexican and Spanish speaking news media from Mexico and the US; one particular news outlet known as La Opinion was able to closely follow and report on the legal actions and wrote editorials supporting the students involved in the strike. Through these media outlets, El Comité was able to gain significant support from "the community, the press and the Mexican Consul."

== Lawsuit and trial ==
Gonzalez, with the assistance of the two attorneys, filed a writ of mandate against the Lemon Grove School Board in the Superior Court of California in San Diego on February 13, 1931. Submitted in the name of Mexican American student Roberto Alvarez, who Gonzalez had been appointed guardian ad litem of, the petition accused the school board of "an attempt at racial segregation… by separating and segregating all the children of Mexican parentage". The suit also pointed out that 95% of the children whom the school board sought to segregate were U.S. citizens and thus "entitled to all the rights and privileges common to all citizens of the United States. Alvarez and ten other students gave testimony proving that their separation of the school was built on inaccurate information concerning the intelligence and learning capabilities of Mexican and Mexican American students and a prejudiced assumption that these students didn't understand English. Alvarez himself was chosen to be named as the plaintiff because his academic records proved to be a counter to what the school board was presenting to the court case. The attorneys during the trial also questioned the teachers who were to teach in the segregated school regarding whether they were fully capable of teaching all the students. In one such situation, the attorneys questioned a teacher with little experience who was expected to teach four grades in one classroom. The attorney asked how teaching students from four different grade levels in one class in the segregated building would create a different learning experience from having one teacher teach a single grade in the other school with all the students integrated together. The teacher responded that it would provide less individualized attention to the students.

The Lemon Grove school board denied all of the suit's allegations and, asking school boards throughout the Southwest, insisted that the separate facility was designed for the benefit of the Mexican and Mexican American youth. The Board maintained that the school was not designed to segregate Mexican children; rather, it argued: 1) that the new facility could house up to 85 pupils and that it boasted a fully equipped playground, 2) that the facility was located in the predominantly Mexican area of town so that children could travel safely to school without risking the walk across the main road, 3) that the majority of the children lacked sufficient knowledge of English and could benefit from special attention, and 4) that it was an Americanization school in which "backward and deficient" children could receive better, and more appropriate, instruction. The evidence revealed in trial challenged the "backward and deficient" characterization of the Mexican and Mexican American children and, most pointedly, the board's location and language arguments.

On March 30, 1931, the presiding Judge Chambers issued his ruling in favor of Roberto Alvarez. The judge repudiated each of the school board's claims. Although allowing that the school board could "separate a few children to offer special instruction," he wrote, "to separate all the Mexicans in one group can only be done by infringing the laws of the State of California." In the decision, the judge ruled that children of Mexican origin could not be segregated under the laws of the state of California, because they were "of the Caucasian race", and laws allowing the segregation of "Oriental", "Negro", and "Indian" children therefore did not apply. The judge also ruled in favor of Alvarez during this court case since he believed that "the pedagogical and curricular segregation" that the board wanted to implement actually inhibited on how these students needed to learn and in fact needed to be exposed to other American children which in his words was "so necessary to learn the English language."

== Decision and results ==
The decision was not appealed, in large part due to the perceived risk of further financial burdens to the district and negative public image. For decades, the only official mention of the court case in local records came in the notes of a post-trial school board meeting, "All members of the board present. On account of having lost the court decision there was some discussion about the return of Mexican (children) pupils but only a spirit of good will prevailed, and it was decided that everything was to continue exactly as it did prior to January 5th." Not even the history of the Lemon Grove School from 1880 to 1966, prepared by a former superintendent, referenced the case.

The ruling did result in the immediate re-entrance of the Mexican and Mexican American students to the grammar school; yet, the ruling did not have concrete implications for desegregation in other segregated California schools. It was not until over a decade later, with Mendez v. Westminster, that schools desegregated statewide.

== Significance ==
Despite its initial obscurity and limited broader impact, the Lemon Grove Case has increasingly gained recognition for its place in the trajectory of school desegregation as the first successful desegregation case. Moreover, scholars agree that the case constitutes a testament to the Mexican immigrant families who, despite a hostile political climate, refused to accept separate and inferior educations for their children and who leveraged the U.S. legal system to challenge such a violation of their children's rights. As noted by historian Robert Alvarez Jr., "This was the first situation when a group of immigrants had gotten together, challenged a school board and won." Some scholars also believe that the case may have contributed to the defeat of a bill in the California state legislature (commonly known as the "Bliss Bill") that would have made it legal to segregate children of Mexican descent under the state's education code. In looking at this bill in further detail, the plan of this legislation was to redefine Mexicans as "Indians" rather than "white", thus making it permissible to follow segregation laws against Mexicans in California.

Another aspect that this court case left behind was the issue regarding classifying Mexican Americans as being "white." Particularly concerning Judge Chamber's ruling on the students' being classified "of the Caucasian race." The verdict that came as a result from this case "did not challenge racial segregation per se" which meant that this exception would not span out to all students of color; in a sense these students weren't categorized under a group that enabled them to be permitted under the law to be segregated by districts and schools. The judge's ruling for the students in favor of the students in this court case was viewed as that the learning capability of these students "would help them overcome their colored status" through their education. Since this court case did not expand or create an effect that led to the eventual desegregation of other schools in the nation, at the local level, the case has received recognition.

In 1986, KPBS with the collaboration of an ethnic studies professor in UCSD, Robert Alvarez, made a documentary film highlighting historical footage and interviews in order to portray the actions done by parents and students as part of the protest against the school board. On March 9, 2007, the Lemon Grove School District recognized Roberto Alvarez, the schoolboy who was the lead plaintiff in the case. The auditorium at the Lemon Grove Middle School, which is on the site of the former grammar school, was dedicated in his honor. In the year 2011 to commemorate the 80 years since this trial occurred, a professor from Palomar college arranged for the screening of a documentary focusing on the lives of Mexican Americans living during the time period this court case was held and titled this as "The Lemon Grove Oral History Project." On May 5, 2016, in order to commemorate the 85 years since the court case was ruled a bill was created in acknowledging March, 30th as being a historic date to remember concerning the City of Lemon Grove.

== Curriculum development ==
A petition was developed, urging for The Lemon Grove Incident to be part of San Diego County school district's curriculum. It was co-hosted by Spring Valley Lemon Grove Democratic Club, Veterans Democratic Club of San Diego County, San Diego Democratic Education Alliance, and San Diego Progressive Dem Club. The curriculum for the Lemon Grove incident had already been formed and adopted by the Lemon Grove school district. The historically significant desegregation case calls for it to be taught as part of Social Studies and History in all SD K-12 schools.

== Depictions in books and movies ==
The Lemon Grove Incident, an award winning KPBS documentary, tells the true story of the events of the first successful major school desegregation case in the United States. It depicts the Actions of the Lemon Grove School District barring children of Mexican descent from entering the school, and the subsequent battle for civil rights, as told by the people involved.

A Sea of Lemon Trees: The Corrido of Roberto Alvarez (by María Dolores Águila) is a fictionalized account of Alvarez's experience at the time of the incident. He was the child chosen as the lead defendant in the case of Roberto Alvarez vs. the Board of Trustees of the Lemon Grove School District. Written in free verse, it has received many awards for children's literature.

Echo (Muñoz Ryan novel) tells the story of fictional Ivy Lopez and her experience of Mexican American segregation during 1943 and the historical impact Roberto Alvarez vs. the board of trustees of the Lemon Grove School District had on multiple communities in California.

== See also ==
- Mendez v. Westminster: a 1946 case in Orange County, CA that also dealt with the issue of segregating Mexican Americans into separate schools.
- Del Rio ISD v. Salvatierra
- Clark v Board of School Directors, an 1868 case in Iowa
- Maestas vs. George H. Shone
- School segregation in California
