= School segregation in California =

Segregation in California Schools

School segregation in California was the segregation of students based on their ethnicity. However, in the 21st century, school segregation was often combined with the socioeconomic status/class of students.

== History ==
In 1851, the first public K-12 school was established in San Francisco, California, and the school year lasted three months. By the end of that same year, six more schools were established, setting up the state's education system and department. Beginning in the 1850s, "colored" children were not allowed to attend schools with white children, so the first "colored" school was established in May 22, 1854 in San Francisco. Notable people who helped establish the "colored" school system in the state include abolitionist John Brown's daughter, Sara Brown, Jeremiah Burke Sanderson, and Biddy Mason. To disburse funding to public schools, the California legislature established an education code in 1855 that gave funding to schools based on the number of white children that attended the school. According to J. Moulder, the State School Superintendent at the time, that legislation was meant to exclude children of Chinese, African, and other descents. Such segregation and exclusion in schools continued with the 1864 California education amendment, which explicitly banned "Negroes, Mongolian, and Indian" children from public schools. In an effort to challenge segregation in public K-12 schools, the state's first education segregation legal case was filed with the California Supreme Court on September 22, 1872, Ward v. Flood. The plaintiff, Harriet Ward, had tried to enroll her daughter, Mary Frances in an all-white school but was denied. The California Supreme Court ruled against Ward, and established the precedent in California that Black children only had the right to attend school, not the right to attend school with white children. Following that ruling, the state legislature passed section 1669 of the 1874 education code that allowed Black and Indian children to attend schools with white children, only if there were no separate "colored" schools for them to attend.

By 1877, attendance was mandatory for all children aged eight through fourteen, though school districts could still offer "separate, but equal" schools for "colored" and white children. The California legislature also passes section 1662 of the 1880 education code, which required all schools must be open for all children, except those with "filthy or vicious habits" or "suffering from contagious or infectious diseases." However, due to the ambiguity of the education code, "Mongolian" children were still banned from public K-12 schools until 1885. In 1890, the California Supreme Court ruled in Wysinger v. Crookshank that Black children cannot be denied attendance from a regular public school. This allowed Black children to attend mixed schools with American Indian and Asian American children, though the state's education code only required a mixed school in a school district if at least ten colored parents requested it, and were approved. As segregation in California schools continued into the 1900s, those with disabilities were able to take the first classes for the deaf, offered by the California School for the Deaf in 1903.

During the 20th century, two significant test cases for school segregation were filed in California. The first being Piper v. Big Pine School District of Inyo County, petitioned in 1923. Alice Piper, and many other children of the Paiute tribe, tried to enroll in the local all-white public high school. When they were denied by the school district because they were American Indians who were assumed to be non-citizens. The judge ruled in favor of the plaintiffs, on the basis that Piper's parents were tax paying citizens of the United States. This allowed American Indian children to attend schools with white children. In 1945, Mendez v. Westminster was filed in the California Supreme and Ninth District Court. The plaintiffs were Mexican and Latino fathers, who claimed that their children, like Sylvia Mendez, were being unconstitutionally discriminated against when they were forced to join segregated Mexican schools in several California school districts. On February 18th, 1946, Judge Paul J McCrormick ruled in favor of the families, allowing children of Mexican or Latino descent from joining schools with white children. Following the ruling, Governor Earl Warren signed a law to repeal segregation in schools on June 14, 1947.

Despite years after the 1954 ruling of Brown v. Board, the issue of segregation exists in some unequal practices in American schools in the 21st century, i.e. tracking. Used as a scientific tool to measure skill in the early 20th century during a eugenics movement, tracking was reused again and implemented in the American education system following Brown v. Board. In schools, tracking was used as a device to test and place students in classes based on skill, but research attests to race and class being factors students are segregated inside schools.

Even following the 1947 ruling of Governor Earl Warren to repeal segregation in schools, data from California shows the lack of integration in highly urbanized schools with minority isolation. This is found in schools where more than 80% of the schools racial demographics is being made up of a minority background. Latino students in the U.S. encounter segregation not only by race, but also by language, class and residential segregation. A 2007 study suggested that white flight may be factored for high levels of segregation in large city California public schools, particularly emphasizing the segregation of Latino students. This phenomenon happens when white students move away from schools with increased admission to Latino students.

== See also ==
- School segregation in the United States
- History of education in California
- The Civil Rights Project/Proyecto Derechos Civiles
- Tracking
