= Mendez vs. Westminster: For All the Children =

2003 film by Sandra Robbie

Mendez vs. Westminster: For All the Children/Para Todos los Niños
- Felicitas Mendez and Gonzalo Mendez; Screen-capture
- Directed by: Sandra Robbie
- Screenplay by: Sandra Robbie
- Produced by: Sandra Robbie
- Starring: Sylvia Mendez
- Narrated by: Sandra Robbie
- Edited by: Harold Elyea
- Distributed by: Sandra Robbie Productions
- Release date: 2003
- Running time: 30 minutes
- Country: United States
- Language: English

Mendez vs. Westminster: For All the Children/Para Todos los Niños is a 2003 American documentary film written, directed, and produced by Sandra Robbie. The film features Sylvia Mendez, Robert L. Carter, and others.

== Synopsis ==
In the mid-1940s, a tenant farmer named Gonzalo Mendez moved his family to the predominantly white Westminster district in Orange County and his children were denied admission to the public school on Seventeenth Street. The Mendez family move was prompted by the opportunity to lease a 60-acre (240,000 m^{2}) farm in Westminster from the Munemitsus, a Japanese family who had been relocated to a Japanese internment camp during World War II. The income the Mendez family earned from the farm enabled them to hire attorney David Marcus and pursue litigation.

In 1945, the plaintiffs of Mendez, Palomino, Estrada, Guzman and Ramirez filed a class action lawsuit on behalf of 5,000 Mexican American children to integrate the schools in four Orange County school districts: Westminster, El Modena, Santa Ana, and Garden Grove.

== Interviews ==
- Sylvia Mendez
- Sandra Mendez Duran
- Robert L. Carter
- Aki Munemitsu Nagauchi
- Gilbert Gonzalez, Professor, University of California, Irvine
- Christopher Arriola, President, California La Raza Lawyers Association
- Ruth Barrios
- Genevieve Barrios Southgate, daughter of Cruz Barrios
- Ralph Perez, El Modena parent
- Lloyd Jones, Assistant Superintendent, Garden Grove Unified School District (retired)
- Jerome Mendez
- Janice Munemitsu
- Frederick P. Aguirre, Superior Court, Orange County, California
- Felicitas Mendez

== Background ==
Mendez vs. Westminster: For All the Children/Para Todos los Niños discusses the little-known Orange County case that made California the first state in the nation to end school segregation – seven years before Brown v. Board of Education. NAACP attorney Thurgood Marshall and then-California Governor Earl Warren played key roles in both cases.

Unlike Plessy v. Ferguson (1896), which focused on racial discrimination and upheld the constitutionality of segregation based on race in public accommodations under the doctrine of "separate but equal," the plaintiffs in Mendez v. Westminster argued that the students were segregated into separate schools based solely on their national origin.

The U.S. Postal Service commemorated the Mendez case on a postage stamp in September 2007.

== Accolades ==
Wins

- National Academy of Television Arts and Sciences: Emmy Award, 2003.
