= Sylvia Mendez =

American civil rights activist (born 1936)

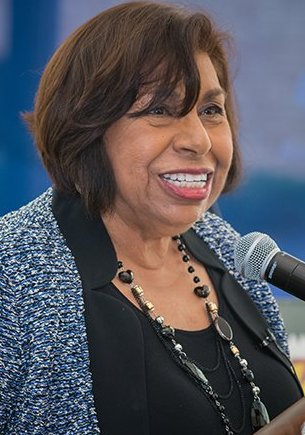
- Born: June 7, 1936 (age 90); Santa Ana, California
- Known for: Mendez v. Westminster, which ended segregated education in California
- Children: 2
- Awards: Presidential Medal of Freedom

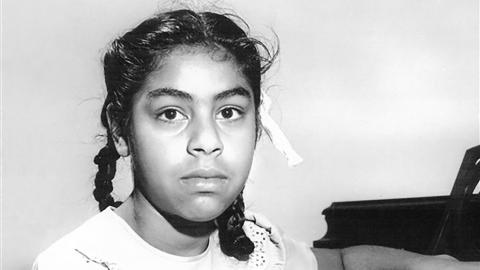
Sylvia Mendez when she was 8 years old.

Sylvia Mendez (born June 7, 1936) is an American civil rights activist and retired nurse. At the age of ten, she played an instrumental role in the Mendez v. Westminster case, the landmark desegregation case of 1946. The case successfully ended de jure segregation in California.

Mendez grew up during a time when most southern and southwestern schools were segregated. In the case of California, Hispanics were not allowed to attend schools that were designated for "Whites" only and were sent to the so-called "Mexican schools." Mendez was denied enrollment to a "Whites" only school, an event which prompted her parents to take action and together organized various sectors of the Hispanic community who filed a lawsuit in the local federal court. The success of their action, of which Sylvia was the principal catalyst, would eventually bring to an end the era of segregated education.

She was awarded the Presidential Medal of Freedom, the United States' highest civilian honor, by President Obama in 2011.

== Early years ==
Mendez was born in 1936 in Santa Ana, California. Her parents were Gonzalo Mendez, an immigrant from Mexico who had a successful agricultural business, and Felicitas Mendez, a native of Juncos, Puerto Rico. The family had just moved from Santa Ana to Westminster to tend a farm that they were renting from the Munemitsus, a Japanese-American family that had been sent to an internment camp during World War II. This took place during a period in history when racial discrimination against Hispanics, and minorities in general, was widespread throughout the United States.

In the 1940s, there were only two schools in Westminster: Hoover Elementary and 17th Street Elementary. Orange County schools were segregated and the Westminster school district was no exception. The district mandated separate campuses for Hispanics and Whites. In 1944, when she was eight, her family tried to register Sylvia and her brothers at a nearby Westminster elementary school. However, the public school did not admit Hispanic students, and the family was told to enroll the Mendez children at Hoover Elementary School, which was specifically for Mexican Americans. After appeals to Westminster's principal and the county school board were unsuccessful, Gonzalo Mendez decided to take legal action. Hoover Elementary was a two-room wooden shack in the middle of the city's Mexican neighborhood, along with the other Hispanics. 17th Street Elementary, which was a "Whites-only" segregated school, was located about a mile away. Unlike Hoover, the 17th Street Elementary school was amongst a row of palm and pine trees and had a lawn lining the school's brick and concrete facade.

In 1943, when Sylvia Mendez was only eight years old, she accompanied her aunt Sally Vidaurri, her brothers and cousins to enroll at the 17th Street Elementary School. Her aunt was told by school officials, that her children, who had light skin would be permitted to enroll, but that neither Sylvia Mendez nor her brothers would be allowed because they were dark-skinned and had a Hispanic surname. Mrs. Vidaurri stormed out of the school with her children, niece and nephews and recounted her experience to her brother Gonzalo.

== Mendez v. Westminster ==
External audio
- You may view: Civil Rights- Mendez vs. Westminster By: Oscar Rosales on YouTube.

Mendez's father Gonzalo and his wife Felicitas took on the task of leading a community battle that changed California, and set an important legal precedent for ending segregation in the United States. Felicitas attended the family's agricultural business, giving Gonzalo time to meet with community leaders to discuss the injustices of the segregated school system. Initially, Gonzalo received little support from the local Latino organizations, but finally, on March 2, 1945, he hired civil rights attorney David Marcus, who filed a federal lawsuit with four other Mexican-American fathers from the Gomez, Palomino, Estrada, and Ramirez families in Los Angeles against four Orange County school districts, Westminster, Santa Ana, Garden Grove, and El Modena (now eastern Orange), on behalf of about 5,000 Hispanic-American schoolchildren.

During the trial, the Westminster school board countered that the segregation was based on the fact that Hispanic students were deficient in the English language and thus needed special instruction. Their claim that there was a "language issue" fell apart when one of the children was asked to testify. The testimony proved that most of the children spoke English and showed that Hispanic-American students had the same capacity for learning as their white counterparts.

On February 18, 1946, Judge Paul J. McCormick ruled in favor of Mendez and his co-plaintiffs. However, the school district appealed. Several organizations joined the appellate case as amicus curiae, including the ACLU, American Jewish Congress, Japanese American Citizens League, and the NAACP which was represented by Thurgood Marshall. More than a year later, on April 14, 1947, the Ninth Circuit Court of Appeals affirmed the district court's ruling in Mendez v. Westminster in favor of the Mexican families. After the ruling was upheld on appeal, then-Governor Earl Warren moved to desegregate all public schools and other public spaces in California.

== Aftermath ==
On January 19, 1948, Mendez and her siblings were finally allowed to attend the 17th Street Elementary school, thus becoming one of the first Hispanics to attend an all-white school in California. However, the situation was not easy for her. Her white peers called her names and treated her poorly. She knew that she had to succeed after her father fought for her to attend the school. Gonzalo Mendez died in 1964 at the age of 51, unaware of the impact that the case for which he fought would have on the nation. Felicitas Mendez lived another 3 decades and died of heart failure at her daughter's home in April 1998.

Mendez v. Westminster set an important precedent for ending segregation in the United States. Thurgood Marshall, who was later appointed a Supreme Court justice in 1967, became the lead NAACP attorney in the 1954 Brown case. He used Marcus's equal protection argument to successfully argue that racial segregation in public schools was unconstitutional. The amicus brief filed for Mendez on behalf of the NAACP contained the arguments he would later use in the Brown case. The Mendez case also deeply influenced the thinking of the California governor at the time, Earl Warren. By 1954, when the Brown case appeared before the high court, Warren had become the chief justice.

== Legacy ==
External audio
- You may view: 2010 Presidential Medal of Freedom Recipient: Sylvia Mendez on YouTube.

Mendez became a nurse and retired after working for thirty years in her field. She adopted two girls and lives in Fullerton, California. She travels and gives lectures to educate others on the historic contributions made by her parents and the co-plaintiffs to the desegregation effort in the United States. The success of the Mendez v. Westminster case made California the first state in the nation to end segregation in school, paving the way for better-known Brown vs. Board of Education seven years later, which would bring an end to school segregation in the entire country.

Sandra Robbie wrote and produced the documentary Mendez v. Westminster: For all the Children / Para Todos los Niños, which debuted on KOCE-TV in Orange County on September 24, 2002, as part of their National Hispanic Heritage Month celebration. The documentary, which also aired on PBS, won an Emmy award and a Golden Mike Award.

A ribbon-cutting ceremony was held in the Los Angeles County Law Library for the opening of a new exhibit in the law library display case titled "Mendez to Brown: A Celebration." The exhibit features photos from both the Mendez and Brown cases, in addition to original documents. In 1998, the district of Santa Ana, California honored the Mendez family by naming a new school the "Gonzalo and Felicitas Mendez Fundamental Intermediate School", after Sylvia Mendez's parents. In 2004, Mendez was invited to the White House for the celebration of National Hispanic Heritage Month. She met with President George W. Bush, who shared her story with key Democrats, including U.S. Senator Hillary Clinton of New York.

On April 14, 2007, the U.S. Postal Service unveiled a stamp commemorating the Mendez v. Westminster case. The unveiling took take place during an event at Chapman University School of Education, Orange County, California commemorating the 60th anniversary of the landmark case.

On September 9, 2009, a second school opened in the Los Angeles community of Boyle Heights bearing the name "Felicitas and Gonzalo Mendez Learning Center." The dual school campus commemorated the efforts of the Mendez and other families from the Westminster case.

On February 15, 2011, Sylvia Mendez was awarded the Presidential Medal of Freedom. In 2012, Brooklyn College awarded Sylvia Mendez an honorary degree.

On May 23, 2018, the board of Berkeley Unified School District voted unanimously to rename Le Conte Elementary School, as Sylvia Mendez Elementary School. The school is a Spanish-English two-way immersion school. Mendez has been a spokesperson at Berkeley schools.

=== Mendez Historic Freedom Trail and Monument ===
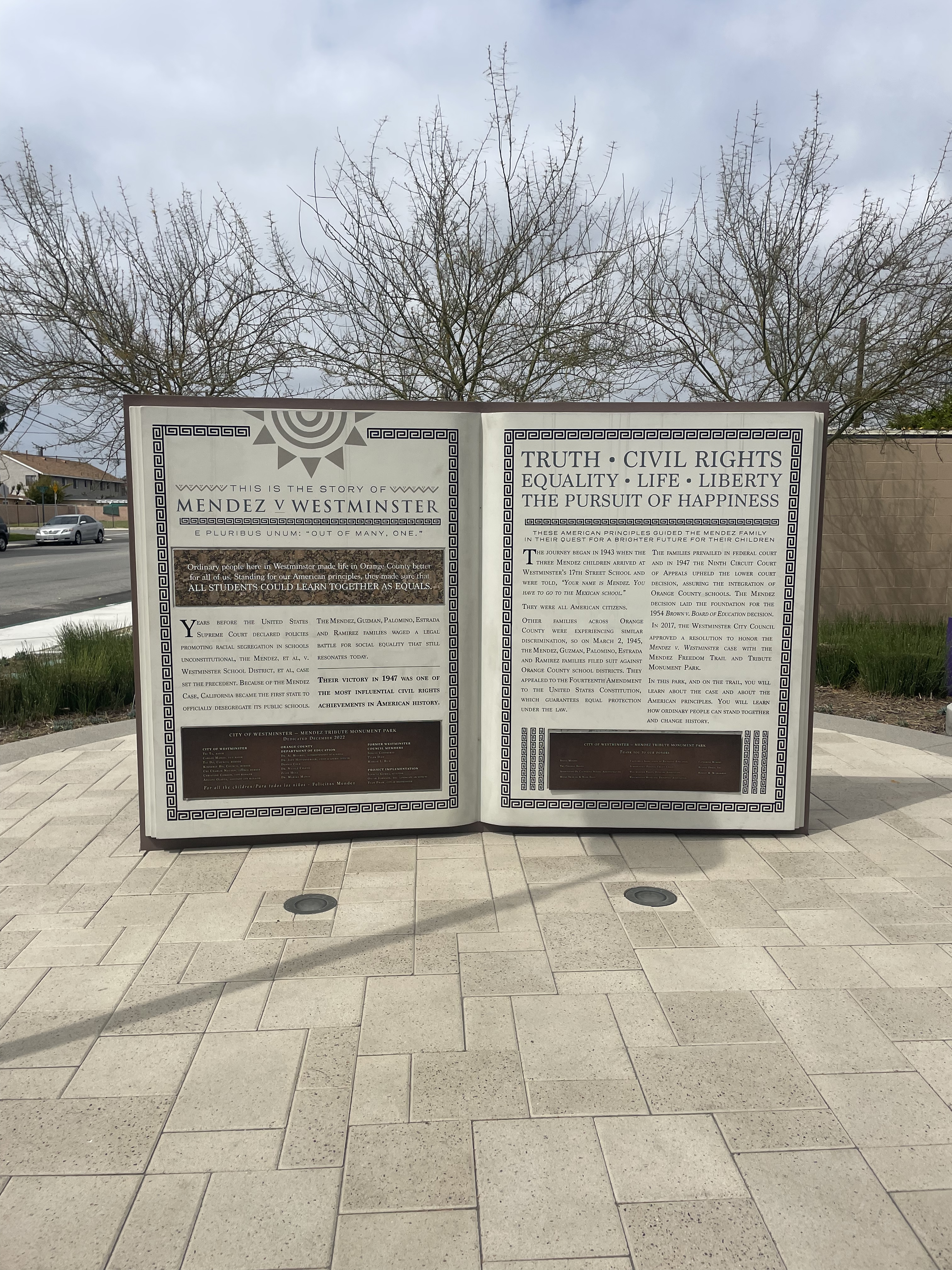
The story of Mendez v. Westminster book monument.

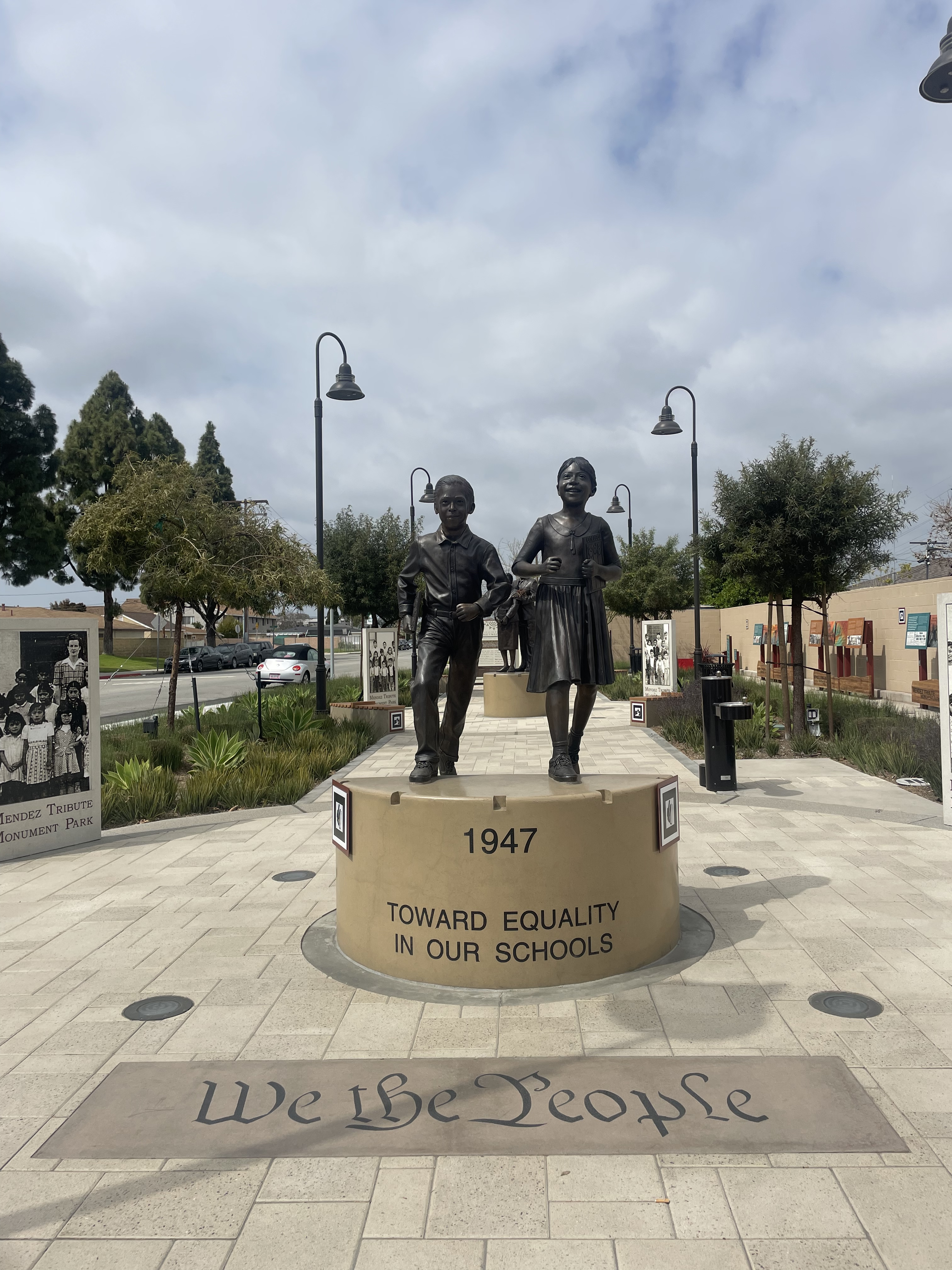
Children walking with books in their hands. Resembling the many children that were represented in the civil rights case.

The Mendez Historic Freedom Trail and Monument opened on December 1, 2022, at 7371 Westminster Boulevard, in Westminster California. It tells the story of what happened, in early 1944, when Sylvia Mendez and her brothers Gonzalo Jr. and Jerome, tried to start attending school the Westminster 17th Street School. Sylvia Mendez and her family had recently moved to Westminster and lived close by the school, but were turned away and were redirected to go to a "Mexican school."

The city of Westminster built the Mendez Historic Freedom Trail and Monument to honor the achievement of the landmark Mendez v. Westminster School District case. It has interactive signs describing this historical desegregation case accompanied with statues and educational activities.

It has two statues, one is of the parents, Gonzalo and Felicitas Mendez, the second is two children walking with two books in their hands. The statue of the children honors the 5,000 children that were represented in this case. At the bottom of the statue it reads “1947: Toward equality in our schools.” The park also features a giant book monument that introduces the historical civil rights case. The trail and monument was funded by a state park program grant of close to $1.3 million and a California Natural Resources Agency of $2.3 million.

== See also ==
- Lemon Grove Incident
- List of notable Puerto Ricans
- List of Puerto Rican Presidential Medal of Freedom recipients
