= Lemon Grove, California =

City in California, United States

- City
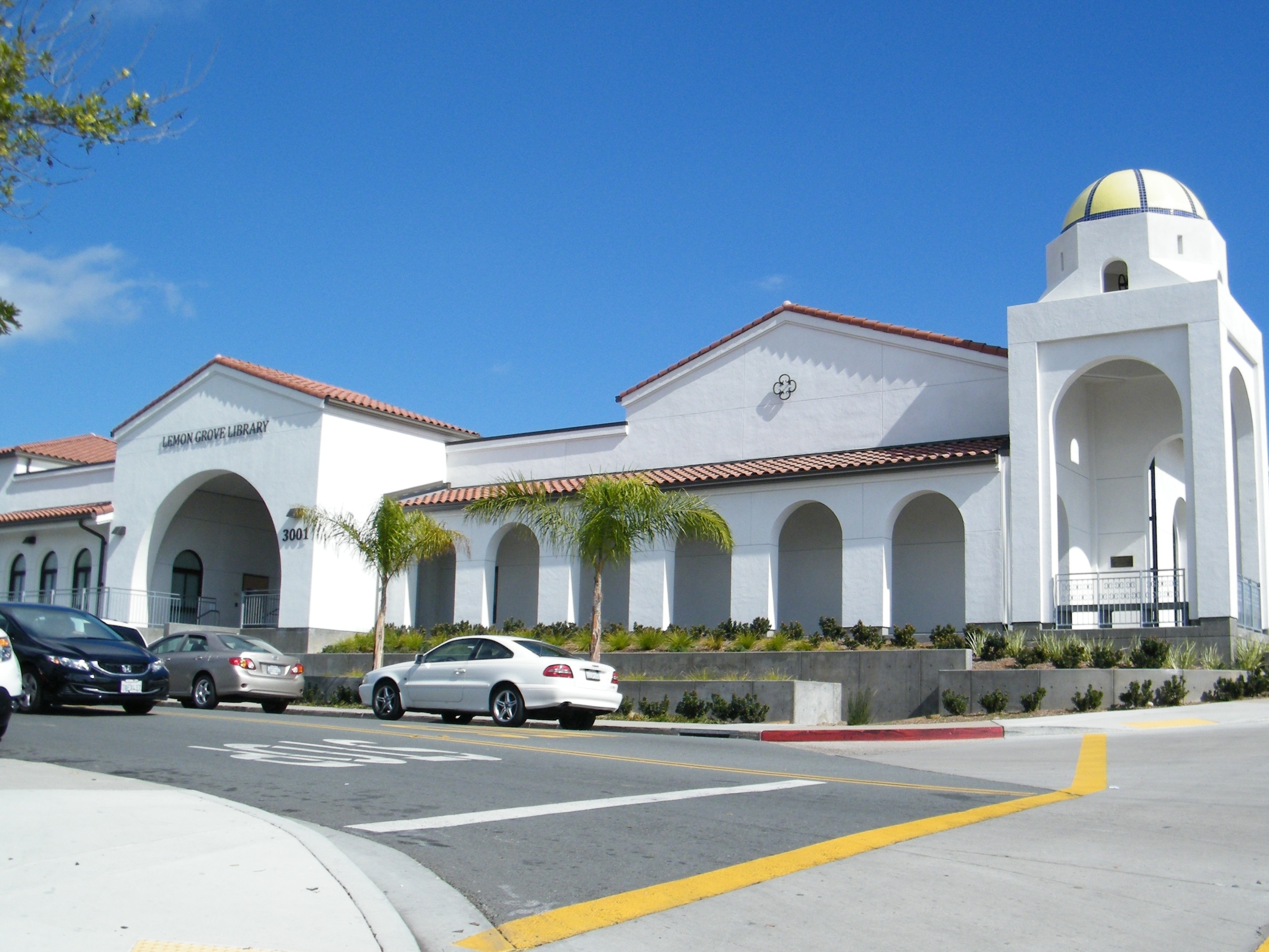
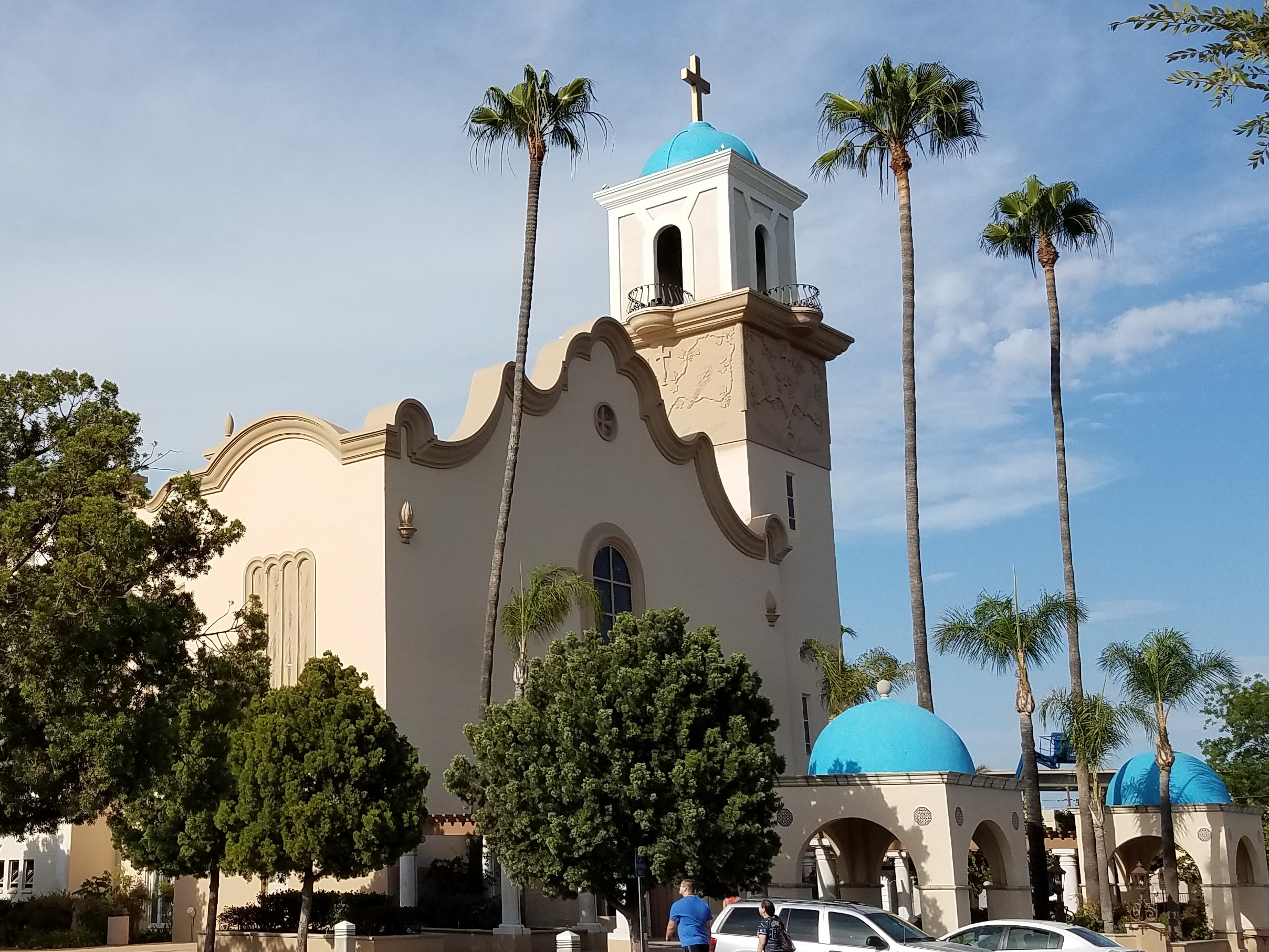
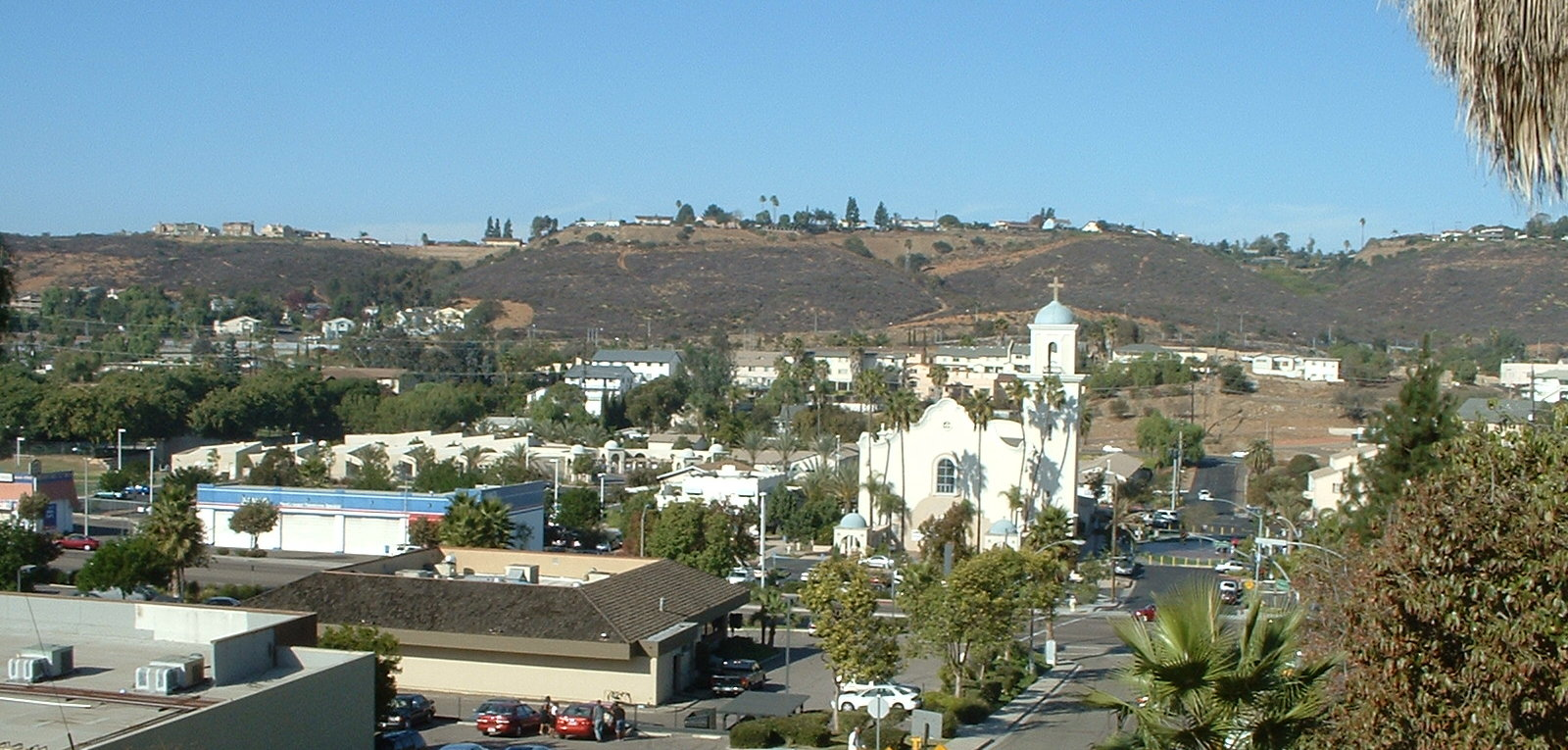
- Motto: Best Climate on Earth
- Interactive map of Lemon Grove, California
- Location in the United States
- Coordinates: 32°44′29″N 117°01′54″W
- Country: United States
- State: California
- County: San Diego
- Incorporated: July 1, 1977

Government
  - Type: Council–manager
  - Mayor: Alysson Snow
  - City manager: Lydia Romero

Area
  - Total: 3.88 sq mi (10.05 km^{2})
  - Land: 3.88 sq mi (10.05 km^{2})
  - Water: 0 sq mi (0.00 km^{2}) 0%
- Elevation: 446 ft (136 m)

Population (2020)
  - Total: 27,627
  - Estimate (2024): 27,867
  - Density: 7,120/sq mi (2,749/km^{2})
- Time zone: UTC-8 (Pacific)
  - Summer (DST): UTC-7 (PDT)
- ZIP code: 91945
- Area code: 619
- FIPS code: 06-41124
- GNIS feature IDs: 1660902, 2410818
- Website: www.lemongrove.ca.gov

Lemon Grove is a city in San Diego County, California, United States. The population was 27,627 at the 2020 census, up from 25,320 at the 2010 census.

== History ==
The area that eventually became Lemon Grove was part of Mission San Diego de Alcalá, one of the Spanish missions in California. After Mexico became independent from Spain, the Californios (residents of Alta California) ranched on various land grants. The area that now includes Lemon Grove was granted to Santiago Argüello, who received more than 59,000 acres.

The first proprietor of Lemon Grove, Robert Allison, arrived in the region in 1850, coming from Sacramento. He purchased thousands of acres from Santiago Argüello's heirs; this land eventually became Lemon Grove, La Mesa, Encanto, and part of Spring Valley. Allison became a director and stockholder of the San Diego and Cuyamaca Railroad in 1886 and built the Allison Flume. Allison's son Joseph filed subdivision maps for "Lemon Grove" in 1892. The name is attributed to Joseph's mother, Tempa Waterman Allison. The climate was suitable for the cultivation of subtropical fruits and vegetables, and farmers from the East and Midwest flocked to the region. The Lemon Grove Fruit Growers Association was formed in 1893; in 1894, the San Diego Union newspaper referred to Lemon Grove as "a sea of lemon trees."

Joseph and Anton Sonka, immigrants from Bohemia, moved to Lemon Grove after stints in Seguin, Texas, and San Diego. The brothers opened a well-known general store, A. Sonka and Son.

Anthony "Tony" F. Sonka, the eldest son of Anton Sonka and his German American wife Anna Klein Sonka, was also a local notable. He was a key supporter of the huge lemon that became the town's symbol and landmark. Sonka and a committee of local ranchers hired local architect Alberto Treganza to build the huge lemon to "make the ultimate statement about the town's purpose, prosperity, and optimism."

In the Lemon Grove Incident in 1931, Juan De Dios Gonzalez led fellow Mexican American parents in Lemon Grove and pursued a successful judicial challenge against the decision of the local school board to build a separate school for Mexican American pupils. The decision of the Superior Court for San Diego County in Roberto Alvarez vs. the board of trustees of the Lemon Grove School District was the first major successful lawsuit against school segregation.

By World War II, most of the citrus groves had disappeared and suburbanization had begun. There had been four elections on incorporation from the 1950s to the 1970s; the issue caused heated debate in the town. The city was finally incorporated on July 1, 1977, becoming California's 414th city. Lemon Grove was incorporated as a general-law city; however, it continues to receive law enforcement services, via contract, from the San Diego County Sheriff's Office.

== Geography ==
Lemon Grove is located at 32°44′0″N 117°2′1″W (32.733451, −117.033702).

According to the United States Census Bureau, the city has a total area of 3.9 square miles (10 km^{2}), all land.

== Transportation ==
The city is served by California State Routes 94 and 125. It is also served by the San Diego Trolley's Orange Line, at Lemon Grove Depot as well as at Massachusetts Avenue Station.

== Demographics ==
Historical population
Census	Pop.	Note	%±
1960	19,348		—
1970	19,690		1.8%
1980	20,780		5.5%
1990	23,984		15.4%
2000	24,918		3.9%
2010	25,320		1.6%
2020	27,627		9.1%
U.S. Decennial Census; 1860–1870 1880-1890; 1900 1910 1920; 1930 1940 1950; 1960 1970 1980; 1990 2000 2010; 2020

=== Racial and ethnic composition ===
Lemon Grove city, California – Racial and ethnic composition Note: the US Census treats Hispanic/Latino as an ethnic category. This table excludes Latinos from the racial categories and assigns them to a separate category. Hispanics/Latinos may be of any race.
Race / Ethnicity (NH = Non-Hispanic)	Pop 2000	Pop 2010	Pop 2020	% 2000	% 2010	% 2020
White alone (NH)	12,017	8,787	7,479	48.23%	34.70%	27.07%
Black or African American alone (NH)	2,874	3,277	3,174	11.53%	12.94%	11.49%
Native American or Alaska Native alone (NH)	169	109	81	0.68%	0.43%	0.29%
Asian alone (NH)	1,391	1,545	2,360	5.58%	6.10%	8.54%
Native Hawaiian or Pacific Islander alone (NH)	189	244	228	0.76%	0.96%	0.83%
Other race alone (NH)	71	38	154	0.28%	0.15%	0.56%
Mixed race or Multiracial (NH)	1,100	885	1,301	4.41%	3.50%	4.71%
Hispanic or Latino (any race)	7,107	10,435	12,850	28.52%	41.21%	46.51%
Total	24,918	25,320	27,627	100.00%	100.00%	100.00%

=== 2020 census ===
As of the 2020 census, Lemon Grove had a population of 27,627. The population density was 7,122.2 inhabitants per square mile (2,749.9/km^{2}). 100.0% of residents lived in urban areas, while 0.0% lived in rural areas.

The median age was 37.6 years. The age distribution was 22.1% under the age of 18, 9.3% aged 18 to 24, 28.5% aged 25 to 44, 24.5% aged 45 to 64, and 15.6% aged 65 or older. For every 100 females there were 94.1 males, and for every 100 females age 18 and over there were 91.8 males age 18 and over.

The census reported that 97.9% of the population lived in households, 0.2% lived in non-institutionalized group quarters, and 1.9% were institutionalized. There were 9,002 households, of which 37.0% had children under the age of 18 living in them. Of all households, 44.7% were married-couple households, 7.7% were cohabiting couple households, 18.7% were households with a male householder and no spouse or partner present, and 28.9% were households with a female householder and no spouse or partner present. About 21.6% of all households were made up of individuals and 10.3% had someone living alone who was 65 years of age or older. The average household size was 3.0. There were 6,323 families (70.2% of all households).

There were 9,345 housing units at an average density of 2,409.1 units per square mile (930.2 units/km^{2}), of which 9,002 (96.3%) were occupied. Of these, 53.3% were owner-occupied and 46.7% were occupied by renters. The homeowner vacancy rate was 0.6% and the rental vacancy rate was 3.6%.

=== 2023 ACS 5-year estimates ===
In 2023, the US Census Bureau estimated that 17.2% of the population were foreign-born. Of all people aged 5 or older, 61.4% spoke only English at home, 30.4% spoke Spanish, 1.2% spoke other Indo-European languages, 5.6% spoke Asian or Pacific Islander languages, and 1.4% spoke other languages. Of those aged 25 or older, 89.1% were high school graduates and 20.3% had a bachelor's degree.

The median household income in 2023 was $79,278, and the per capita income was $35,402. About 7.3% of families and 10.3% of the population were below the poverty line.

=== 2010 census ===
At the 2010 census Lemon Grove had a population of 25,320. The population density was 6,525.3 inhabitants per square mile (2,519.4/km^{2}). The racial makeup of Lemon Grove was 8,545 (33.3%) White, 3,495 (13.8%) African American, 225 (0.9%) Native American, 1,628 (6.3%) Asian, 275 (1.1%) Pacific Islander, 4,828 (19.1%) from other races, and 1,801 (7.1%) from two or more races. Hispanic or Latino of any race were 11,635 persons (45.2%).

The census reported that 24,974 people (98.6% of the population) lived in households, 200 (0.8%) lived in non-institutionalized group quarters, and 146 (0.6%) were institutionalized.

There were 8,434 households, 3,295 (39.1%) had children under the age of 18 living in them, 3,863 (45.8%) were opposite-sex married couples living together, 1,419 (16.8%) had a female householder with no husband present, 601 (7.1%) had a male householder with no wife present. There were 516 (6.1%) unmarried opposite-sex partnerships, and 94 (1.1%) same-sex married couples or partnerships. 1,928 households (22.9%) were one person and 734 (8.7%) had someone living alone who was 65 or older. The average household size was 2.96. There were 5,883 families (69.8% of households); the average family size was 3.51.

The age distribution was 6,458 people (25.5%) under the age of 18, 2,583 people (10.2%) aged 18 to 24, 6,900 people (27.3%) aged 25 to 44, 6,550 people (25.9%) aged 45 to 64, and 2,829 people (11.2%) who were 65 or older. The median age was 35.0 years. For every 100 females, there were 95.3 males. For every 100 females age 18 and over, there were 93.6 males.

There were 8,868 housing units at an average density of 2,285.4 per square mile, of the occupied units 4,609 (54.6%) were owner-occupied and 3,825 (45.4%) were rented. The homeowner vacancy rate was 2.0%; the rental vacancy rate was 5.0%. 13,984 people (55.2% of the population) lived in owner-occupied housing units and 10,990 people (43.4%) lived in rental housing units.

== Government ==
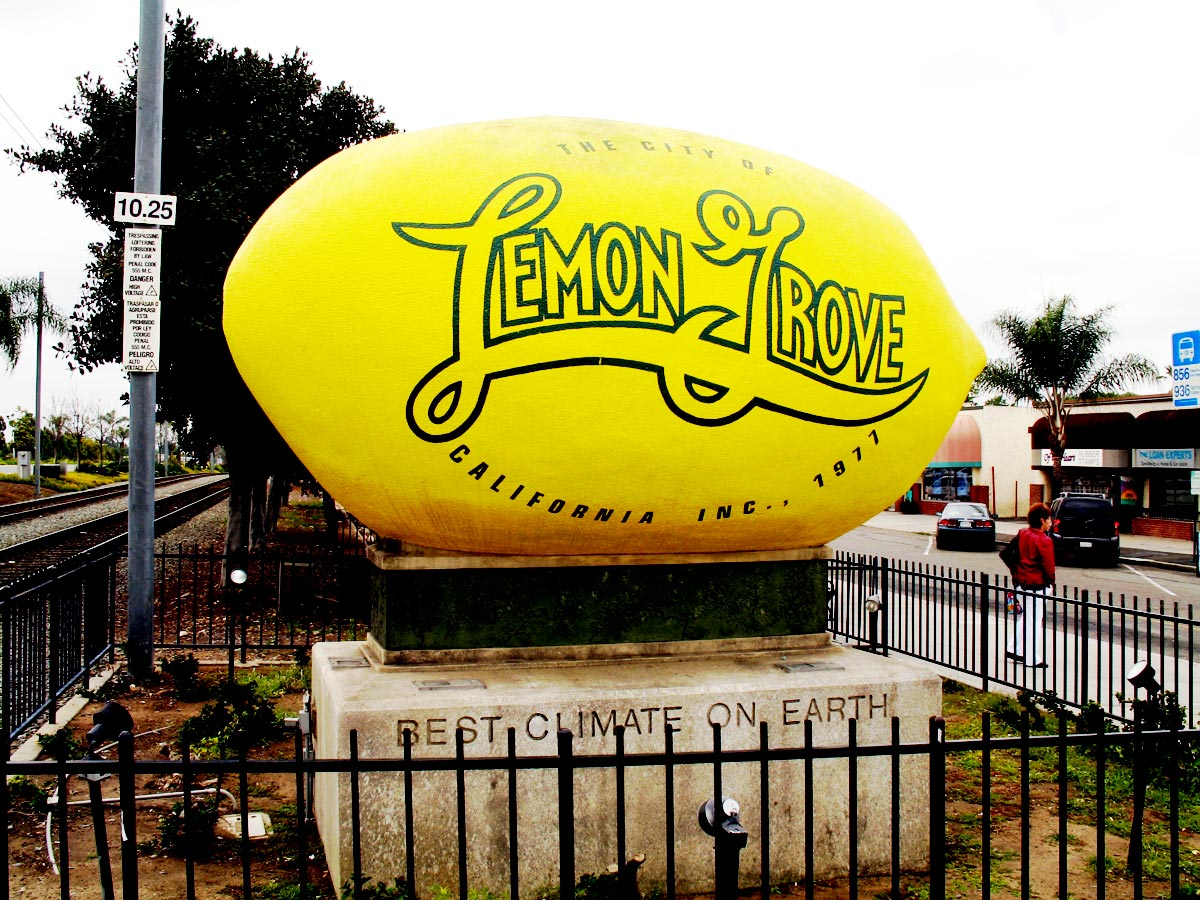
Lemon Grove sign.

As of December 2025, the city council includes Mayor Alysson Snow, and council members Yadira Altamirano, Jessyka Heredia, Seth Smith, and Jennifer Mendoza. The City Manager is Lydia Romero.

In the California State Legislature, Lemon Grove is in the 39th senatorial district, represented by Democrat Akilah Weber Pierson, and in the 79th Assembly district, represented by Democrat LaShae Sharp-Collins.

In the United States House of Representatives, Lemon Grove is in California's 51st congressional district, represented by Democrat Sara Jacobs.

== Notable people ==
- Rob Crow, American musician
- Rob $tone, rapper
- John Forester, cycling activist, author and cycling transportation engineer
- Actor Dennis Hopper, around age 13
- Mary Moore (1922–1962), All-American Girls Professional Baseball League player, a native of Lemon Grove
- Abdussattar Shaikh, cofounder of San Diego's Islamic Center
- "Shotgun Tom" Kelly, radio personality
- Lalo Alcaraz, cartoonist
- Boyd Rice, Far Right American musician, artist, and author, recounts vandalising the lemon grove sign as a teenager in an interview for Re:Search magazine.
- Mark Williamson, former pitcher for the Baltimore Orioles
- Rodrigo Toscano, poet
- Conan Gray, American singer-songwriter, born in Lemon Grove

== "The World's Biggest Lemon" ==
Weighing some 3000 pounds, and approximately 10 feet long and six feet wide, the lemon sculpture—affectionately known as the World's Biggest Lemon—sits on a concrete base at the corner of Broadway and Lemon Grove Avenue, adjacent to 3361 Main Street. It lies before a small lemon grove beside the Orange Line Trolley tracks near the local trolley station and downtown bus stop. Written across the base of this monument are the words "Best Climate On Earth". Designed by Lemon Grove architect Alberto O. Treganza, the lemon was originally built as a parade float for the 1928 Fourth of July Fiesta de San Diego parade, carrying the town's first Miss Lemon Grove, Amorita Treganza, Alberto's 16-year-old daughter. In 1930, the float was plastered to create a permanent sculpture and displayed near its current location.

== Education ==
Public primary education in the city is provided by the Lemon Grove School District. Grossmont Union High School District provides secondary and adult education.

=== High schools ===
Eligible students are sent outside the town for secondary education.

=== Middle schools ===
- Lemon Grove Academy Middle School

=== K-8 schools ===
- Vista La Mesa Academy
- Mount Vernon School

=== Elementary schools ===
- Lemon Grove Academy Elementary School
- Monterey Heights Elementary School
- San Altos Elementary School
- San Miguel Elementary School
