= Lemon Grove School District =

School district in California, United States

Address
- 8025 Lincoln Street Lemon Grove, California, 91945; United States

District information
- Type: Public
- Grades: Preschool - 8
- Established: March 18, 1893
- Superintendent: Erica Balakian
- Schools: 7
- NCES District ID: 0621330

Students and staff
- Students: 3,160 (2020–2021)
- Teachers: 145.46 (FTE)
- Staff: 220.72 (FTE)
- Student–teacher ratio: 21.72:1

Other information
- Website: www.lemongrovesd.net

Lemon Grove School District is a school district based in Lemon Grove in San Diego County, California.

It runs one middle school, two K-8 schools, and four elementary schools. Lemon Grove School District was officially founded on March 18, 1893 when the San Diego County Board of Supervisors and Harry Wagner, County School Superintendent, approved the boundaries of the Lemon Grove District.

The superintendent of the district is Erica Balakian. The district is managed by a five-person Governing Board.
