= List of AM radio stations in the United States by call sign (initial letters WG–WM) =

This is a list of AM radio stations in the United States having call signs beginning with the letters WG to WM.

== WG-- ==
Callsign	Frequency	City of license
WGAA	1340 AM	Cedartown, Georgia
WGAB	1180 AM	Newburgh, Indiana
WGAC	580 AM	Augusta, Georgia
WGAD	930 AM	Rainbow City, Alabama
WGAI	560 AM	Elizabeth City, North Carolina
WGAM	1250 AM	Manchester, New Hampshire
WGAN	560 AM	Portland, Maine
WGAP	1400 AM	Maryville, Tennessee
WGAS	1420 AM	South Gastonia, North Carolina
WGAU	1340 AM	Athens, Georgia
WGAW	1340 AM	Gardner, Massachusetts
WGBB	1240 AM	Freeport, New York
WGBF	1280 AM	Evansville, Indiana
WGBN	1360 AM	McKeesport, Pennsylvania
WGBR	1150 AM	Goldsboro, North Carolina
WGBW	1590 AM	Denmark, Wisconsin
WGCD	1490 AM	Chester, South Carolina
WGCH	1490 AM	Greenwich, Connecticut
WGCL	1370 AM	Bloomington, Indiana
WGCM	1240 AM	Gulfport, Mississippi
WGCR	720 AM	Pisgah Forest, North Carolina
WGDJ	1300 AM	Rensselaer, New York
WGDL	1200 AM	Lares, Puerto Rico
WGDN	1350 AM	Gladwin, Michigan
WGES	680 AM	St. Petersburg, Florida
WGET	1320 AM	Gettysburg, Pennsylvania
WGEZ	1490 AM	Beloit, Wisconsin
WGFC	1030 AM	Floyd, Virginia
WGFT	1330 AM	Campbell, Ohio
WGFY	1480 AM	Charlotte, North Carolina
WGGA	1240 AM	Gainesville, Georgia
WGGH	1150 AM	Marion, Illinois
WGGI	990 AM	Somerset, Pennsylvania
WGGO	1590 AM	Salamanca, New York
WGH	1310 AM	Newport News, Virginia
WGHB	1250 AM	Farmville, North Carolina
WGHM	900 AM	Nashua, New Hampshire
WGHN	1370 AM	Grand Haven, Michigan
WGHQ	920 AM	Kingston, New York
WGHT	1500 AM	Pompton Lakes, New Jersey
WGIG	1440 AM	Brunswick, Georgia
WGIL	1400 AM	Galesburg, Illinois
WGIR	610 AM	Manchester, New Hampshire
WGIT	1660 AM	Canóvanas, Puerto Rico
WGIV	1370 AM	Pineville, North Carolina
WGJK	1360 AM	Rome, Georgia
WGKA	920 AM	Atlanta
WGKB	1510 AM	Waukesha, Wisconsin
WGL	1250 AM	Fort Wayne, Indiana
WGLB	1560 AM	Elm Grove, Wisconsin
WGLL	1570 AM	Auburn, Indiana
WGLM	1380 AM	Greenville, Michigan
WGMA	1490 AM	Hazleton, Pennsylvania
WGMF	750 AM	Olyphant, Pennsylvania
WGMI	1440 AM	Bremen, Georgia
WGMM	1460 AM	Tunkhannock, Pennsylvania
WGMN	1240 AM	Roanoke, Virginia
WGMP	1170 AM	Montgomery, Alabama
WGN	720 AM	Chicago
WGNC	1450 AM	Gastonia, North Carolina
WGNR	1470 AM	Anderson, Indiana
WGNS	1450 AM	Murfreesboro, Tennessee
WGNY	1220 AM	Newburgh, New York
WGNZ	1110 AM	Fairborn, Ohio
WGOC	1320 AM	Kingsport, Tennessee
WGOH	1370 AM	Grayson, Kentucky
WGOK	900 AM	Mobile, Alabama
WGOL	920 AM	Russellville, Alabama
WGOS	1070 AM	High Point, North Carolina
WGOW	1150 AM	Chattanooga, Tennessee
WGPA	1100 AM	Bethlehem, Pennsylvania
WGPL	1350 AM	Portsmouth, Virginia
WGR	550 AM	Buffalo, New York
WGRA	790 AM	Cairo, Georgia
WGRB	1390 AM	Chicago
WGRI	1050 AM	Cincinnati
WGRM	1240 AM	Greenwood, Mississippi
WGRP	940 AM	Greenville, Pennsylvania
WGRV	1340 AM	Greeneville, Tennessee
WGSF	1030 AM	Memphis, Tennessee
WGSO	990 AM	New Orleans, Louisiana
WGSP	1310 AM	Charlotte, North Carolina
WGST	720 AM	Hogansville, Georgia
WGSV	1270 AM	Guntersville, Alabama
WGTH	540 AM	Richlands, Virginia
WGTJ	1330 AM	Murrayville, Georgia
WGTK	970 AM	Louisville, Kentucky
WGTN	1400 AM	Georgetown, South Carolina
WGTO	910 AM	Cassopolis, Michigan
WGTX	1240 AM	West Yarmouth, Massachusetts
WGUE	1180 AM	Turrell, Arkansas
WGUL	860 AM	Dunedin, Florida
WGUN	950 AM	Valdosta, Georgia
WGUY	1230 AM	Veazie, Maine
WGVA	1240 AM	Geneva, New York
WGVL	1440 AM	Greenville, South Carolina
WGVM	1260 AM	Greenville, Mississippi
WGVY	1000 AM	Altavista, Virginia
WGXI	1420 AM	Plymouth, Wisconsin
WGY	810 AM	Schenectady, New York
WGYM	1580 AM	Hammonton, New Jersey
WGYV	1380 AM	Greenville, Alabama

== WH-- ==
Callsign	Frequency	City of license
WHA	970 AM	Madison, Wisconsin
WHAG	1410 AM	Halfway, Maryland
WHAK	960 AM	Rogers City, Michigan
WHAM	1180 AM	Rochester, New York
WHAN	1430 AM	Ashland, Virginia
WHAP	1340 AM	Hopewell, Virginia
WHAS	840 AM	Louisville, Kentucky
WHAT	1340 AM	Philadelphia
WHAW	980 AM	Lost Creek, West Virginia
WHAZ	1330 AM	Troy, New York
WHB	810 AM	Kansas City, Missouri
WHBB	1490 AM	Selma, Alabama
WHBC	1480 AM	Canton, Ohio
WHBE	680 AM	Newburg, Kentucky
WHBG	1360 AM	Harrisonburg, Virginia
WHBK	1460 AM	Marshall, North Carolina
WHBL	1330 AM	Sheboygan, Wisconsin
WHBN	1420 AM	Harrodsburg, Kentucky
WHBO	1040 AM	Pinellas Park, Florida
WHBQ	560 AM	Memphis, Tennessee
WHBU	1240 AM	Anderson, Indiana
WHBY	1150 AM	Kimberly, Wisconsin
WHCO	1230 AM	Sparta, Illinois
WHCU	870 AM	Ithaca, New York
WHDD	1020 AM	Sharon, Connecticut
WHDM	1440 AM	McKenzie, Tennessee
WHEE	1370 AM	Martinsville, Virginia
WHEN	620 AM	Syracuse, New York
WHEO	1270 AM	Stuart, Virginia
WHEP	1310 AM	Foley, Alabama
WHEW	1380 AM	Franklin, Tennessee
WHFA	1240 AM	Poynette, Wisconsin
WHFB	1060 AM	Benton Harbor–St. Joseph, Michigan
WHGB	1400 AM	Harrisburg, Pennsylvania
WHGG	1090 AM	Kingsport, Tennessee
WHGM	1330 AM	Havre De Grace, Maryland
WHGS	1270 AM	Hampton, South Carolina
WHGT	1590 AM	Maugansville, Maryland
WHHV	1400 AM	Hillsville, Virginia
WHHW	1130 AM	Hilton Head Island, South Carolina
WHIC	1460 AM	Rochester, New York
WHIE	1320 AM	Griffin, Georgia
WHIN	1010 AM	Gallatin, Tennessee
WHIO	1290 AM	Dayton, Ohio
WHIP	1350 AM	Mooresville, North Carolina
WHIR	1230 AM	Danville, Kentucky
WHIS	1440 AM	Bluefield, West Virginia
WHIT	1550 AM	Madison, Wisconsin
WHIY	1600 AM	Huntsville, Alabama
WHIZ	1240 AM	Zanesville, Ohio
WHJA	890 AM	Laurel, Mississippi
WHJC	1360 AM	Matewan, West Virginia
WHJD	920 AM	Hazlehurst, Georgia
WHJJ	920 AM	Providence, Rhode Island
WHK	1420 AM	Cleveland, Ohio
WHKP	1450 AM	Hendersonville, North Carolina
WHKW	1220 AM	Cleveland, Ohio
WHKY	1290 AM	Hickory, North Carolina
WHKZ	1440 AM	Warren, Ohio
WHLI	1100 AM	Hempstead, New York
WHLJ	1400 AM	Moultrie, Georgia
WHLL	1450 AM	Springfield, Massachusetts
WHLM	930 AM	Bloomsburg, Pennsylvania
WHLN	1410 AM	Harlan, Kentucky
WHLO	640 AM	Akron, Ohio
WHLS	1450 AM	Port Huron, Michigan
WHLX	1590 AM	Marine City, Michigan
WHLY	1580 AM	South Bend, Indiana
WHMA	1390 AM	Anniston, Alabama
WHMP	1400 AM	Northampton, Massachusetts
WHMT	740 AM	Tullahoma, Tennessee
WHNC	890 AM	Henderson, North Carolina
WHNK	1330 AM	Marion, Virginia
WHNM	1350 AM	Laconia, New Hampshire
WHNQ	1140 AM	St. Paul, Virginia
WHNR	1360 AM	Cypress Gardens, Florida
WHNY	1000 AM	Paris, Tennessee
WHNZ	1250 AM	Tampa, Florida
WHO	1040 AM	Des Moines, Iowa
WHOC	1490 AM	Philadelphia, Mississippi
WHOG	1120 AM	Hobson City, Alabama
WHOL	1600 AM	Allentown, Pennsylvania
WHOO	1080 AM	Kissimmee, Florida
WHOP	1230 AM	Hopkinsville, Kentucky
WHOS	800 AM	Decatur, Alabama
WHOT	1590 AM	Palm River-Clair Mel, Florida
WHOW	1520 AM	Clinton, Illinois
WHOY	1210 AM	Salinas, Puerto Rico
WHP	580 AM	Harrisburg, Pennsylvania
WHPY	1590 AM	Clayton, North Carolina
WHRY	1450 AM	Hurley, Wisconsin
WHSQ	880 AM	New York City
WHSY	950 AM	Hattiesburg, Mississippi
WHTB	1400 AM	Fall River, Massachusetts
WHTC	1450 AM	Holland, Michigan
WHTG	1410 AM	Eatontown, New Jersey
WHTH	790 AM	Heath, Ohio
WHTK	1280 AM	Rochester, New York
WHTP	1280 AM	Gardiner, Maine
WHTY	1460 AM	Phenix City, Alabama/Columbus, Georgia
WHUB	1400 AM	Cookeville, Tennessee
WHUC	1230 AM	Hudson, New York
WHUN	1150 AM	Huntingdon, Pennsylvania
WHVN	1240 AM	Charlotte, North Carolina
WHVO	1480 AM	Hopkinsville, Kentucky
WHVR	1280 AM	Hanover, Pennsylvania
WHVW	950 AM	Hyde Park, New York
WHWH	1350 AM	Princeton, New Jersey
WHYF	720 AM	Shiremanstown, Pennsylvania
WHYL	960 AM	Carlisle, Pennsylvania
WHYM	1260 AM	Lake City, South Carolina
WHYN	560 AM	Springfield, Massachusetts
WHZP	1400 AM	Veazie, Maine

== WI-- ==
Callsign	Frequency	City of license
WI2XAC	740 AM	Ponce, Puerto Rico
WIAC	740 AM	San Juan, Puerto Rico
WIAM	900 AM	Williamston, North Carolina
WIBA	1310 AM	Madison, Wisconsin
WIBH	1440 AM	Anna, Illinois
WIBK	1360 AM	Watseka, Illinois
WIBM	1450 AM	Jackson, Michigan
WIBQ	1230 AM	Terre Haute, Indiana
WIBS	1540 AM	Guayama, Puerto Rico
WIBW	580 AM	Topeka, Kansas
WIBX	950 AM	Utica, New York
WICC	600 AM	Bridgeport, Connecticut
WICH	1310 AM	Norwich, Connecticut
WICK	1400 AM	Scranton, Pennsylvania
WICU	1310 AM	Warren, Pennsylvania
WICY	1490 AM	Malone, New York
WIDA	1400 AM	Carolina, Puerto Rico
WIDG	940 AM	St. Ignace, Michigan
WIDS	570 AM	Russell Springs, Kentucky
WIDU	1600 AM	Fayetteville, North Carolina
WIEL	1400 AM	Elizabethtown, Kentucky
WIEZ	1490 AM	Decatur, Alabama
WIFA	1240 AM	Knoxville, Tennessee
WIFI	1460 AM	Florence, New Jersey
WIFN	1340 AM	Atlanta
WIGM	1490 AM	Medford, Wisconsin
WIGN	1550 AM	Bristol, Tennessee
WIGO	1570 AM	Morrow, Georgia
WIGT	1690 AM	Charlotte Amalie, United States Virgin Islands
WIGY	1240 AM	Lewiston, Maine
WIHB	1280 AM	Macon, Georgia
WIHM	1410 AM	Taylorville, Illinois
WIIN	780 AM	Ridgeland, Mississippi
WIJD	1270 AM	Prichard, Alabama
WIJR	880 AM	Highland, Illinois
WIKE	1490 AM	Newport, Vermont
WILB	1060 AM	Canton, Ohio
WILD	1090 AM	Boston, Massachusetts
WILE	1270 AM	Cambridge, Ohio
WILI	1400 AM	Willimantic, Connecticut
WILK	980 AM	Wilkes-Barre, Pennsylvania
WILL	580 AM	Urbana, Illinois
WILM	1450 AM	Wilmington, Delaware
WILO	1570 AM	Frankfort, Indiana
WILS	1320 AM	Lansing, Michigan
WILY	1210 AM	Centralia, Illinois
WIMA	1150 AM	Lima, Ohio
WIMG	1300 AM	Ewing, New Jersey
WIMS	1420 AM	Michigan City, Indiana
WINA	1070 AM	Charlottesville, Virginia
WINC	1400 AM	Winchester, Virginia
WIND	560 AM	Chicago
WINE	940 AM	Brookfield, Connecticut
WING	1410 AM	Dayton, Ohio
WINI	1420 AM	Murphysboro, Illinois
WINQ	1490 AM	Brattleboro, Vermont
WINR	680 AM	Binghamton, New York
WINS	1010 AM	New York City
WINT	1330 AM	Willoughby, Ohio
WINW	1520 AM	Canton, Ohio
WINY	1350 AM	Putnam, Connecticut
WINZ	940 AM	Miami, Florida
WIOD	610 AM	Miami, Florida
WIOE	1450 AM	Fort Wayne, Indiana
WIOI	1010 AM	New Boston, Ohio
WIOL	1580 AM	Columbus, Georgia
WION	1430 AM	Ionia, Michigan
WIOO	1000 AM	Carlisle, Pennsylvania
WIOS	1480 AM	Tawas City–East Tawas, Michigan
WIOU	1350 AM	Kokomo, Indiana
WIOZ	550 AM	Pinehurst, North Carolina
WIPC	1280 AM	Lake Wales, Florida
WIPR	940 AM	San Juan, Puerto Rico
WIRA	1400 AM	Fort Pierce, Florida
WIRB	1490 AM	Level Plains, Alabama
WIRJ	740 AM	Humboldt, Tennessee
WIRL	1290 AM	Peoria, Illinois
WIRV	1550 AM	Irvine, Kentucky
WIRY	1340 AM	Plattsburgh, New York
WISA	1390 AM	Isabela, Puerto Rico
WISE	1310 AM	Asheville, North Carolina
WISK	990 AM	Lawrenceville, Georgia
WISN	1130 AM	Milwaukee, Wisconsin
WISP	1570 AM	Doylestown, Pennsylvania
WISR	680 AM	Butler, Pennsylvania
WISS	1100 AM	Berlin, Wisconsin
WISW	1320 AM	Columbia, South Carolina
WITA	1490 AM	Knoxville, Tennessee
WITK	1550 AM	Pittston, Pennsylvania
WITO	1230 AM	Ironton, Ohio
WITS	1340 AM	Sebring, Florida
WITY	980 AM	Danville, Illinois
WITZ	990 AM	Jasper, Indiana
WIVV	1370 AM	Island Of Vieques, Puerto Rico
WIWA	1270 AM	Eatonville, Florida
WIXC	1060 AM	Titusville, Florida
WIXE	1190 AM	Monroe, North Carolina
WIXI	1360 AM	Jasper, Alabama
WIXK	1590 AM	New Richmond, Wisconsin
WIXN	1460 AM	Dixon, Illinois
WIXT	1230 AM	Little Falls, New York
WIXZ	950 AM	Steubenville, Ohio
WIYD	1260 AM	Palatka, Florida
WIZE	1340 AM	Springfield, Ohio
WIZK	1570 AM	Bay Springs, Mississippi
WIZM	1410 AM	La Crosse, Wisconsin
WIZR	930 AM	Johnstown, New York
WIZS	1450 AM	Henderson, North Carolina
WIZZ	1520 AM	Greenfield, Massachusetts

== WJ-- ==
Callsign	Frequency	City of license
WJAG	780 AM	Norfolk, Nebraska
WJAK	1460 AM	Jackson, Tennessee
WJAM	1340 AM	Selma, Alabama
WJAS	1320 AM	Pittsburgh, Pennsylvania
WJAT	800 AM	Swainsboro, Georgia
WJAW	630 AM	St. Marys, West Virginia
WJAY	1280 AM	Mullins, South Carolina
WJBB	1300 AM	Winder, Georgia
WJBC	1230 AM	Bloomington, Illinois
WJBE	1040 AM	Powell, Tennessee
WJBI	1290 AM	Batesville, Mississippi
WJBM	1480 AM	Jerseyville, Illinois
WJBO	1150 AM	Baton Rouge, Louisiana
WJBR	1010 AM	Seffner, Florida
WJBS	1440 AM	Holly Hill, South Carolina
WJBW	1000 AM	Jupiter, Florida
WJCC	1700 AM	Miami Springs, Florida
WJCM	1050 AM	Sebring, Florida
WJCP	1460 AM	North Vernon, Indiana
WJCV	1290 AM	Jacksonville, North Carolina
WJCW	910 AM	Johnson City, Tennessee
WJDA	1300 AM	Quincy, Massachusetts
WJDM	1520 AM	Mineola, New York
WJDX	620 AM	Jackson, Mississippi
WJDY	1470 AM	Salisbury, Maryland
WJEJ	1240 AM	Hagerstown, Maryland
WJEM	1150 AM	Valdosta, Georgia
WJER	1450 AM	Dover–New Philadelphia, Ohio
WJET	1400 AM	Erie, Pennsylvania
WJFA	910 AM	Apollo, Pennsylvania
WJFC	1480 AM	Jefferson City, Tennessee
WJFG	1480 AM	Latrobe, Pennsylvania
WJFK	1580 AM	Morningside, Maryland
WJFN	820 AM	Chester, Virginia
WJFP	740 AM	Chester, Pennsylvania
WJFV	1650 AM	Portsmouth, Virginia
WJIB	740 AM	Cambridge, Massachusetts
WJIL	1550 AM	Jacksonville, Illinois
WJIM	1240 AM	Lansing, Michigan
WJIP	1370 AM	Ellenville, New York
WJIT	1250 AM	Sabana, Puerto Rico
WJJC	1270 AM	Commerce, Georgia
WJJM	1490 AM	Lewisburg, Tennessee
WJJQ	810 AM	Tomahawk, Wisconsin
WJJT	1540 AM	Jellico, Tennessee
WJKI	1320 AM	Salisbury, Maryland
WJKN	1510 AM	Jackson, Michigan
WJKY	1060 AM	Jamestown, Kentucky
WJLD	1400 AM	Fairfield, Alabama
WJLE	1480 AM	Smithville, Tennessee
WJLK	1160 AM	Lakewood Township, New Jersey
WJLS	560 AM	Beckley, West Virginia
WJLX	1240 AM	Jasper, Alabama
WJMC	1240 AM	Rice Lake, Wisconsin
WJMK	1250 AM	Bridgeport, Michigan
WJMO	1300 AM	Cleveland, Ohio
WJMP	1070 AM	Plattsburgh, New York
WJMS	590 AM	Ironwood, Michigan
WJMT	730 AM	Merrill, Wisconsin
WJMX	1400 AM	Darlington, South Carolina
WJNC	1240 AM	Jacksonville, North Carolina
WJNJ	1320 AM	Jacksonville, Florida
WJNL	1210 AM	Kingsley, Michigan
WJNO	1290 AM	West Palm Beach, Florida
WJNT	1180 AM	Pearl, Mississippi
WJNX	1330 AM	Fort Pierce, Florida
WJNZ	1000 AM	Robertsdale, Alabama
WJOB	1230 AM	Hammond, Indiana
WJOC	1490 AM	Chattanooga, Tennessee
WJOI	1340 AM	Milwaukee, Wisconsin
WJOK	1050 AM	Kaukauna, Wisconsin
WJOL	1340 AM	Joliet, Illinois
WJON	1240 AM	St. Cloud, Minnesota
WJOT	1510 AM	Wabash, Indiana
WJOX	690 AM	Birmingham, Alabama
WJOY	1230 AM	Burlington, Vermont
WJPA	1450 AM	Washington, Pennsylvania
WJPF	1340 AM	Herrin, Illinois
WJPI	1470 AM	Plymouth, North Carolina
WJPJ	1190 AM	Humboldt, Tennessee
WJQS	1400 AM	Jackson, Mississippi
WJR	760 AM	Detroit, Michigan
WJRD	1150 AM	Tuscaloosa, Alabama
WJRI	1340 AM	Lenoir, North Carolina
WJRM	1390 AM	Troy, North Carolina
WJRW	1340 AM	Grand Rapids, Michigan
WJSB	1050 AM	Crestview, Florida
WJSM	1110 AM	Martinsburg, Pennsylvania
WJTH	900 AM	Calhoun, Georgia
WJTI	1460 AM	West Allis, Wisconsin
WJTN	1240 AM	Jamestown, New York
WJTO	730 AM	Bath, Maine
WJTW	1480 AM	Bridgeport, Alabama
WJUL	1230 AM	Hiawassee, Georgia
WJUN	1220 AM	Mexico, Pennsylvania
WJUS	1310 AM	Marion, Alabama
WJWL	900 AM	Georgetown, Delaware
WJXL	1010 AM	Jacksonville Beach, Florida
WJXO	1580 AM	Chattahoochee, Florida
WJYK	980 AM	Chase City, Virginia
WJYM	730 AM	Bowling Green, Ohio
WJYP	1300 AM	St. Albans, West Virginia
WJYZ	960 AM	Albany, Georgia
WJZ	1300 AM	Baltimore, Maryland
WJZA	1100 AM	Hapeville, Georgia
WJZN	1400 AM	Augusta, Maine
WJZU	1250 AM	Franklin, Virginia

== WK-- ==
Callsign	Frequency	City of license
WKAC	1080 AM	Athens, Alabama
WKAF	1420 AM	St. Albans, Vermont
WKAJ	1120 AM	Saint Johnsville, New York
WKAL	1450 AM	Rome, New York
WKAM	1460 AM	Goshen, Indiana
WKAN	1320 AM	Kankakee, Illinois
WKAQ	580 AM	San Juan, Puerto Rico
WKAR	870 AM	East Lansing, Michigan
WKAT	1450 AM	Miami, Florida
WKAV	1400 AM	Charlottesville, Virginia
WKAX	1500 AM	Russellville, Alabama
WKAZ	680 AM	Charleston, West Virginia
WKBA	1550 AM	Vinton, Virginia
WKBC	800 AM	North Wilkesboro, North Carolina
WKBH	1570 AM	Holmen, Wisconsin
WKBI	1400 AM	St. Marys, Pennsylvania
WKBK	1290 AM	Keene, New Hampshire
WKBL	1250 AM	Covington, Tennessee
WKBM	930 AM	Sandwich, Illinois
WKBN	570 AM	Youngstown, Ohio
WKBO	1230 AM	Harrisburg, Pennsylvania
WKBV	1490 AM	Richmond, Indiana
WKBY	1080 AM	Chatham, Virginia
WKBZ	1090 AM	Muskegon, Michigan
WKCB	1340 AM	Hindman, Kentucky
WKCE	1180 AM	Knoxville, Tennessee
WKCI	970 AM	Waynesboro, Virginia
WKCM	1160 AM	Hawesville, Kentucky
WKCT	930 AM	Bowling Green, Kentucky
WKCU	1350 AM	Corinth, Mississippi
WKCW	1420 AM	Warrenton, Virginia
WKCY	1300 AM	Harrisonburg, Virginia
WKDA	900 AM	Lebanon, Tennessee
WKDI	840 AM	Denton, Maryland
WKDK	1240 AM	Newberry, South Carolina
WKDM	1380 AM	New York City
WKDN	950 AM	Philadelphia
WKDO	1560 AM	Liberty, Kentucky
WKDP	1330 AM	Corbin, Kentucky
WKDR	1490 AM	Berlin, New Hampshire
WKDV	1460 AM	Manassas, Virginia
WKDW	900 AM	Staunton, Virginia
WKDX	1250 AM	Hamlet, North Carolina
WKDZ	1110 AM	Cadiz, Kentucky
WKEG	1030 AM	Sterling Heights, Michigan
WKEI	1450 AM	Kewanee, Illinois
WKEU	1450 AM	Griffin, Georgia
WKEW	1400 AM	Greensboro, North Carolina
WKEX	1430 AM	Blacksburg, Virginia
WKEY	1340 AM	Covington, Virginia
WKEZ	1240 AM	Bluefield, West Virginia
WKFB	770 AM	Jeannette, Pennsylvania
WKFE	1550 AM	Yauco, Puerto Rico
WKFI	1090 AM	Wilmington, Ohio
WKFL	1170 AM	Bushnell, Florida
WKFN	540 AM	Clarksville, Tennessee
WKFO	1380 AM	Kittanning, Pennsylvania
WKGE	850 AM	Johnstown, Pennsylvania
WKGM	940 AM	Smithfield, Virginia
WKGN	1340 AM	Knoxville, Tennessee
WKGX	1080 AM	Lenoir, North Carolina
WKHB	620 AM	Irwin, Pennsylvania
WKHM	970 AM	Jackson, Michigan
WKHZ	1460 AM	Easton, Maryland
WKIC	1390 AM	Hazard, Kentucky
WKIP	1450 AM	Poughkeepsie, New York
WKIQ	1240 AM	Eustis, Florida
WKIX	850 AM	Raleigh, North Carolina
WKJB	710 AM	Mayagüez, Puerto Rico
WKJG	1380 AM	Fort Wayne, Indiana
WKJK	1080 AM	Louisville, Kentucky
WKJR	1460 AM	Rantoul, Illinois
WKJV	1380 AM	Asheville, North Carolina
WKJW	1010 AM	Black Mountain, North Carolina
WKKP	1410 AM	McDonough, Georgia
WKKS	1570 AM	Vanceburg, Kentucky
WKKX	1600 AM	Wheeling, West Virginia
WKLA	1450 AM	Ludington, Michigan
WKLB	1290 AM	Manchester, Kentucky
WKLF	1000 AM	Clanton, Alabama
WKLJ	1290 AM	Sparta, Wisconsin
WKLK	1230 AM	Cloquet, Minnesota
WKLP	1390 AM	Keyser, West Virginia
WKLV	1440 AM	Blackstone, Virginia
WKLY	980 AM	Hartwell, Georgia
WKMB	1070 AM	Stirling, New Jersey
WKMC	1370 AM	Roaring Spring, Pennsylvania
WKMI	1360 AM	Kalamazoo, Michigan
WKMQ	1060 AM	Tupelo, Mississippi
WKND	1480 AM	Windsor, Connecticut
WKNG	1060 AM	Tallapoosa, Georgia
WKNR	850 AM	Cleveland, Ohio
WKNV	890 AM	Fairlawn, Virginia
WKNW	1400 AM	Sault Sainte Marie, Michigan
WKNY	1490 AM	Kingston, New York
WKOK	1070 AM	Sunbury, Pennsylvania
WKOO	710 AM	Rose Hill, North Carolina
WKOX	1430 AM	Everett, Massachusetts
WKPT	1400 AM	Kingsport, Tennessee
WKQK	1300 AM	Cocoa Beach, Florida
WKQW	1120 AM	Oil City, Pennsylvania
WKRA	1110 AM	Holly Springs, Mississippi
WKRC	550 AM	Cincinnati
WKRD	790 AM	Louisville, Kentucky
WKRK	1320 AM	Murphy, North Carolina
WKRM	1340 AM	Columbia, Tennessee
WKRO	1490 AM	Cairo, Illinois
WKRS	1220 AM	Waukegan, Illinois
WKSK	580 AM	West Jefferson, North Carolina
WKSN	1340 AM	Jamestown, New York
WKSR	1420 AM	Pulaski, Tennessee
WKST	1280 AM	New Castle, Pennsylvania
WKTA	1330 AM	Evanston, Illinois
WKTE	1090 AM	King, North Carolina
WKTF	1550 AM	Vienna, Georgia
WKTP	1590 AM	Jonesborough, Tennessee
WKTR	840 AM	Earlysville, Virginia
WKTX	830 AM	Cortland, Ohio
WKTY	580 AM	La Crosse, Wisconsin
WKTZ	1220 AM	Jacksonville, Florida
WKUM	1470 AM	Orocovis, Puerto Rico
WKUN	1490 AM	Monroe, Georgia
WKVA	920 AM	Lewistown, Pennsylvania
WKVI	1520 AM	Knox, Indiana
WKVM	810 AM	San Juan, Puerto Rico
WKVQ	1540 AM	Eatonton, Georgia
WKVX	960 AM	Wooster, Ohio
WKWF	1600 AM	Key West, Florida
WKWL	1230 AM	Florala, Alabama
WKWN	1420 AM	Trenton, Georgia
WKXL	1450 AM	Concord, New Hampshire
WKXO	1500 AM	Berea, Kentucky
WKXR	1260 AM	Asheboro, North Carolina
WKXV	900 AM	Knoxville, Tennessee
WKY	930 AM	Oklahoma City, Oklahoma
WKYH	600 AM	Paintsville, Kentucky
WKYK	940 AM	Burnsville, North Carolina
WKYO	1360 AM	Caro, Michigan
WKYW	1490 AM	Frankfort, Kentucky
WKZI	800 AM	Casey, Illinois
WKZK	1600 AM	North Augusta, South Carolina
WKZO	590 AM	Kalamazoo, Michigan

== WL-- ==
Callsign	Frequency	City of license
WLAA	1600 AM	Winter Garden, Florida
WLAC	1510 AM	Nashville, Tennessee
WLAD	800 AM	Danbury, Connecticut
WLAF	1450 AM	La Follette, Tennessee
WLAG	1240 AM	La Grange, Georgia
WLAK	1260 AM	Amery, Wisconsin
WLAM	1470 AM	Lewiston, Maine
WLAN	1390 AM	Lancaster, Pennsylvania
WLAP	630 AM	Lexington, Kentucky
WLAQ	1410 AM	Rome, Georgia
WLAR	1450 AM	Athens, Tennessee
WLAT	910 AM	New Britain, Connecticut
WLAW	1490 AM	Whitehall, Michigan
WLAY	1450 AM	Muscle Shoals, Alabama
WLBA	1130 AM	Gainesville, Georgia
WLBB	1330 AM	Carrollton, Georgia
WLBE	790 AM	Leesburg–Eustis, Florida
WLBG	860 AM	Laurens, South Carolina
WLBK	1360 AM	Dekalb, Illinois
WLBL	930 AM	Auburndale, Wisconsin
WLBN	1590 AM	Lebanon, Kentucky
WLBQ	1570 AM	Morgantown, Kentucky
WLBR	1270 AM	Lebanon, Pennsylvania
WLBY	1290 AM	Saline, Michigan
WLCB	1430 AM	Buffalo, Kentucky
WLCC	760 AM	Brandon, Florida
WLCH	1440 AM	Manchester Township, Pennsylvania
WLCK	1250 AM	Scottsville, Kentucky
WLCM	1390 AM	Holt, Michigan
WLCO	1530 AM	Lapeer, Michigan
WLCR	1040 AM	Mt Washington, Kentucky
WLCX	1490 AM	La Crosse, Wisconsin
WLDS	1180 AM	Jacksonville, Illinois
WLDX	990 AM	Fayette, Alabama
WLDY	1340 AM	Ladysmith, Wisconsin
WLEA	1480 AM	Hornell, New York
WLEC	1450 AM	Sandusky, Ohio
WLEE	1570 AM	Winona, Mississippi
WLEJ	1450 AM	State College, Pennsylvania
WLEM	1250 AM	Emporium, Pennsylvania
WLEO	1170 AM	Ponce, Puerto Rico
WLES	590 AM	Bon Air, Virginia
WLEW	1340 AM	Bad Axe, Michigan
WLEY	1080 AM	Cayey, Puerto Rico
WLGJ	1260 AM	Philipsburg, Pennsylvania
WLGN	1510 AM	Logan, Ohio
WLIB	1190 AM	New York City
WLID	1370 AM	Patchogue, New York
WLIJ	1580 AM	Shelbyville, Tennessee
WLIK	1270 AM	Newport, Tennessee
WLIL	730 AM	Lenoir City, Tennessee
WLIM	1440 AM	Medford, New York
WLIN	1380 AM	Waynesboro, Pennsylvania
WLIP	1050 AM	Kenosha, Wisconsin
WLIQ	1530 AM	Quincy, Illinois
WLIS	1420 AM	Old Saybrook, Connecticut
WLIV	920 AM	Livingston, Tennessee
WLJN	1400 AM	Elmwood Township, Michigan
WLJW	1370 AM	Cadillac, Michigan
WLKD	1570 AM	Minocqua, Wisconsin
WLKF	1430 AM	Lakeland, Florida
WLKR	1510 AM	Norwalk, Ohio
WLLH	1400 AM	Lawrence, Massachusetts
WLLL	930 AM	Lynchburg, Virginia
WLLM	1370 AM	Lincoln, Illinois
WLLN	1370 AM	Lillington, North Carolina
WLLQ	1530 AM	Chapel Hill, North Carolina
WLLV	1240 AM	Louisville, Kentucky
WLLY	1350 AM	Wilson, North Carolina
WLMR	1450 AM	Chattanooga, Tennessee
WLMV	1480 AM	Madison, Wisconsin
WLMZ	1300 AM	West Hazleton, Pennsylvania
WLNA	1420 AM	Peekskill, New York
WLNC	1300 AM	Laurinburg, North Carolina
WLNL	1000 AM	Horseheads, New York
WLNR	1230 AM	Kinston, North Carolina
WLOA	1470 AM	Farrell, Pennsylvania
WLOB	1310 AM	Portland, Maine
WLOC	1150 AM	Munfordville, Kentucky
WLOD	1140 AM	Loudon, Tennessee
WLOE	1490 AM	Eden, North Carolina
WLOH	1320 AM	Lancaster, Ohio
WLOI	1540 AM	La Porte, Indiana
WLOK	1340 AM	Memphis, Tennessee
WLOL	1330 AM	Minneapolis, Minnesota
WLON	1050 AM	Lincolnton, North Carolina
WLOP	1370 AM	Jesup, Georgia
WLOR	1550 AM	Huntsville, Alabama
WLOU	1350 AM	Louisville, Kentucky
WLOV	1370 AM	Washington, Georgia
WLOY	660 AM	Rural Retreat, Virginia
WLPK	1580 AM	Connersville, Indiana
WLPO	1220 AM	LaSalle, Illinois
WLPR	960 AM	Prichard, Alabama
WLQH	940 AM	Chiefland, Florida
WLQV	1500 AM	Detroit, Michigan
WLQY	1320 AM	Hollywood, Florida
WLRC	850 AM	Walnut, Mississippi
WLRM	1380 AM	Millington, Tennessee
WLRP	1460 AM	San Sebastián, Puerto Rico
WLRS	1570 AM	New Albany, Indiana
WLRT	1250 AM	Nicholasville, Kentucky
WLRV	1380 AM	Lebanon, Virginia
WLS	890 AM	Chicago
WLSD	1220 AM	Big Stone Gap, Virginia
WLSG	1340 AM	Wilmington, North Carolina
WLSH	1410 AM	Lansford, Pennsylvania
WLSI	900 AM	Pikeville, Kentucky
WLSQ	1240 AM	Loris, South Carolina
WLSS	930 AM	Sarasota, Florida
WLSV	790 AM	Wellsville, New York
WLTA	1400 AM	Alpharetta, Georgia
WLTG	1430 AM	Upper Grand Lagoon, Florida
WLTH	1370 AM	Gary, Indiana
WLTI	1550 AM	New Castle, Indiana
WLTN	1400 AM	Littleton, New Hampshire
WLTP	910 AM	Marietta, Ohio
WLTQ	730 AM	Charleston, South Carolina
WLUE	1600 AM	Eminence, Kentucky
WLUI	670 AM	Lewistown, Pennsylvania
WLUV	1520 AM	Loves Park, Illinois
WLUX	1450 AM	Dunbar, West Virginia
WLVA	580 AM	Lynchburg, Virginia
WLVJ	1020 AM	Boynton Beach, Florida
WLVL	1340 AM	Lockport, New York
WLVP	870 AM	Gorham, Maine
WLVY	1600 AM	Elmira Heights–Horseheads, New York
WLW	700 AM	Cincinnati
WLWE	1360 AM	Roanoke, Alabama
WLWI	1440 AM	Montgomery, Alabama
WLWL	770 AM	Rockingham, North Carolina
WLXE	1600 AM	Rockville, Maryland
WLXG	1300 AM	Lexington, Kentucky
WLXN	1440 AM	Lexington, North Carolina
WLYC	1050 AM	Williamsport, Pennsylvania
WLYN	1360 AM	Lynn, Massachusetts
WLYQ	1050 AM	Parkersburg, West Virginia
WLYV	1290 AM	Bellaire, Ohio
WLZR	1560 AM	Melbourne, Florida
WLZX	1600 AM	East Longmeadow, Massachusetts

== WM-- ==
Callsign	Frequency	City of license
WMAC	940 AM	Macon, Georgia
WMAF	1230 AM	Madison, Florida
WMAJ	1230 AM	Elmira, New York
WMAK	1570 AM	Lobelville, Tennessee
WMAM	570 AM	Marinette, Wisconsin
WMAN	1400 AM	Mansfield, Ohio
WMAX	1440 AM	Bay City, Michigan
WMAY	970 AM	Springfield, Illinois
WMBA	1460 AM	Ambridge, Pennsylvania
WMBD	1470 AM	Peoria, Illinois
WMBG	740 AM	Williamsburg, Virginia
WMBH	1560 AM	Joplin, Missouri
WMBM	1490 AM	Miami Beach, Florida
WMBN	1340 AM	Petoskey, Michigan
WMBO	1340 AM	Auburn, New York
WMBS	590 AM	Uniontown, Pennsylvania
WMC	790 AM	Memphis, Tennessee
WMCA	570 AM	New York City
WMCH	1260 AM	Church Hill, Tennessee
WMCJ	1460 AM	Cullman, Alabama
WMCL	1060 AM	McLeansboro, Illinois
WMCP	1280 AM	Columbia, Tennessee
WMCR	1600 AM	Oneida, New York
WMCT	1390 AM	Mountain City, Tennessee
WMDB	880 AM	Nashville, Tennessee
WMDD	1480 AM	Fajardo, Puerto Rico
WMDG	1260 AM	East Point, Georgia
WMDR	1340 AM	Augusta, Maine
WMDX	1580 AM	Columbus, Wisconsin
WMEJ	1190 AM	Bay St. Louis, Mississippi
WMEN	640 AM	Royal Palm Beach, Florida
WMEQ	880 AM	Menomonie, Wisconsin
WMER	1390 AM	Meridian, Mississippi
WMET	1160 AM	Gaithersburg, Maryland
WMEX	1510 AM	Quincy, Massachusetts
WMFA	1400 AM	Raeford, North Carolina
WMFD	630 AM	Wilmington, North Carolina
WMFG	1240 AM	Hibbing, Minnesota
WMFJ	1450 AM	Daytona Beach, Florida
WMFN	640 AM	Zeeland, Michigan
WMFR	1230 AM	High Point, North Carolina
WMFS	680 AM	Memphis, Tennessee
WMGC	810 AM	Murfreesboro, Tennessee
WMGE	1670 AM	Dry Branch, Georgia
WMGG	1470 AM	Egypt Lake, Florida
WMGJ	1240 AM	Gadsden, Alabama
WMGO	1370 AM	Canton, Mississippi
WMGR	930 AM	Bainbridge, Georgia
WMGW	1490 AM	Meadville, Pennsylvania
WMGY	800 AM	Montgomery, Alabama
WMHZ	1340 AM	Holt, Alabama
WMIA	1070 AM	Arecibo, Puerto Rico
WMIC	660 AM	Sandusky, Michigan
WMID	1340 AM	Atlantic City, New Jersey
WMIK	560 AM	Middlesboro, Kentucky
WMIN	1010 AM	Sauk Rapids, Minnesota
WMIQ	1450 AM	Iron Mountain, Michigan
WMIR	1200 AM	Atlantic Beach, South Carolina
WMIS	1240 AM	Natchez, Mississippi
WMIX	940 AM	Mount Vernon, Illinois
WMJH	810 AM	Rockford, Michigan
WMJL	1500 AM	Marion, Kentucky
WMJR	1380 AM	Nicholasville, Kentucky
WMKM	1440 AM	Inkster, Michigan
WMKT	1270 AM	Charlevoix, Michigan
WMLB	1690 AM	Avondale Estates, Georgia
WMLM	1520 AM	St. Louis, Michigan
WMLP	1380 AM	Milton, Pennsylvania
WMLR	1230 AM	Hohenwald, Tennessee
WMLT	1330 AM	Dublin, Georgia
WMMA	1480 AM	Irondale, Alabama
WMMB	1240 AM	Melbourne, Florida
WMMI	830 AM	Shepherd, Michigan
WMML	1230 AM	Glens Falls, New York
WMMV	1350 AM	Cocoa, Florida
WMNA	730 AM	Gretna, Virginia
WMNC	1430 AM	Morganton, North Carolina
WMNI	920 AM	Columbus, Ohio
WMNT	1500 AM	Manatí, Puerto Rico
WMNY	1150 AM	New Kensington, Pennsylvania
WMNZ	1050 AM	Montezuma, Georgia
WMOA	1490 AM	Marietta, Ohio
WMOB	1360 AM	Mobile, Alabama
WMOG	910 AM	Meridian, Mississippi
WMOH	1450 AM	Hamilton, Ohio
WMOK	920 AM	Metropolis, Illinois
WMON	1340 AM	Montgomery, West Virginia
WMOP	900 AM	Ocala, Florida
WMOU	1230 AM	Berlin, New Hampshire
WMOV	1360 AM	Ravenswood, West Virginia
WMPC	1230 AM	Lapeer, Michigan
WMPL	920 AM	Hancock, Michigan
WMPM	1270 AM	Smithfield, North Carolina
WMPO	1390 AM	Middleport–Pomeroy, Ohio
WMPS	1210 AM	Bartlett, Tennessee
WMPW	970 AM	Danville, Virginia
WMPX	1490 AM	Midland, Michigan
WMQM	1600 AM	Lakeland, Tennessee
WMQU	1230 AM	Grayling, Michigan
WMRB	910 AM	Columbia, Tennessee
WMRC	1490 AM	Milford, Massachusetts
WMRD	1150 AM	Middletown, Connecticut
WMRE	1550 AM	Charlestown, West Virginia
WMRI	860 AM	Marion, Indiana
WMRN	1490 AM	Marion, Ohio
WMRV	1450 AM	Spring Lake, North Carolina
WMSA	1340 AM	Massena, New York
WMSG	1050 AM	Oakland, Maryland
WMSO	1240 AM	Southaven, Mississippi
WMSP	740 AM	Montgomery, Alabama
WMSR	1320 AM	Manchester, Tennessee
WMST	1150 AM	Mt. Sterling, Kentucky
WMSW	1120 AM	Hatillo, Puerto Rico
WMT	600 AM	Cedar Rapids, Iowa
WMTA	1380 AM	Central City, Kentucky
WMTD	1380 AM	Hinton, West Virginia
WMTI	1160 AM	Barceloneta–Manatí, Puerto Rico
WMTL	870 AM	Leitchfield, Kentucky
WMTM	1300 AM	Moultrie, Georgia
WMTN	1300 AM	Morristown, Tennessee
WMTR	1250 AM	Morristown, New Jersey
WMUN	1340 AM	Muncie, Indiana
WMUZ	1200 AM	Taylor, Michigan
WMVB	1440 AM	Millville, New Jersey
WMVG	1450 AM	Milledgeville, Georgia
WMVP	1000 AM	Chicago
WMVX	1110 AM	Salem, New Hampshire
WMXB	1280 AM	Tuscaloosa, Alabama
WMXF	1400 AM	Waynesville, North Carolina
WMYJ	1540 AM	Martinsville, Indiana
WMYM	990 AM	Kendall, Florida
WMYN	1420 AM	Mayodan, North Carolina
WMYR	1410 AM	Fort Myers, Florida

== See also ==
- North American call sign
