= WELR =

WELR may refer to:

- WELR-FM, a radio station (102.3 FM) licensed to Roanoke, Alabama, United States
- WLWE, a radio station (1360 AM) licensed to Roanoke, Alabama, which held the call sign WELR until 2013
