= WJNX =

WJNX may refer to:

- WJNX (AM), a radio station (1330 AM) licensed to serve Fort Pierce, Florida, United States
- WJNX-FM, a radio station (106.1 FM) licensed to serve Okeechobee, Florida
