= WKCY =

WKCY may refer to:

- WKCY (AM), a radio station (1300 AM) licensed to Harrisonburg, Virginia, United States
- WKCY-FM, a radio station (104.3 FM) licensed to Harrisonburg, Virginia, United States
