= WAFC =

The abbreviation WAFC can refer to:

In sport:

- Waihopai AFC
- Waiuku AFC
- Waltham Abbey F.C.
- Warkworth AFC
- Wellington Amateurs F.C.
- West Australian Football Commission
- Wigan Athletic Football Club
- Willington A.F.C.
- Winnipeg Alliance FC
- Whitchurch Alport F.C.
- Witton Albion Football Club
- Woolwich Arsenal Football Club, the former name of Arsenal Football Club
- Workington A.F.C.
- Wrexham A.F.C.

Other uses:

- WAFC (AM), a radio station (590 AM) licensed to serve Clewiston, Florida, United States
- WJNX-FM, a radio station (106.1 FM) licensed to serve Okeechobee, Florida, which held the call sign WAFC-FM from 2010 to 2019
- WLLY-FM, a radio station (99.5 FM) licensed to serve Clewiston, Florida, which held the call sign WAFC-FM from 1984 to 2010
- World Area Forecast Center

== See also ==
- WFC (disambiguation)
- AFCW
