= WJOT =

WJOT may refer to:

- WJOT (AM), a radio station (1510 AM) licensed to Wabash, Indiana, United States
- WJOT-FM, a radio station (105.9 FM) licensed to Wabash, Indiana, United States
- WHYM, a radio station (1260 AM) licensed to serve Lake City, South Carolina, United States, which held the call sign WJOT from 1953 to 1991
