= WOKB =

WOKB may refer to:

- WOKB (AM), a radio station (1680 AM) licensed to Winter Garden, Florida, United States
- WLAA, a radio station (1600 AM) licensed to Winter Garden, Florida, United States which held the WOKB call sign from 1959 to 1988 and 1994 to 2008
- WOKB-LP, a defunct low-power television station (channel 7) formerly licensed to Orlando, Florida
