= WHFB =

WHFB may refer to:

- WHFB (AM), a radio station (1060 AM) licensed to serve Benton Harbor/St. Joseph, Michigan, United States
- WYTZ-FM, a radio station (99.9 FM) licensed to serve Benton Harbor, Michigan, which held the call sign WHFB-FM from 1947 to 2016
- Warhammer Fantasy Battle, a fantasy-themed tabletop miniature wargame by Games Workshop
