= WXXO =

WXXO may refer to:

- WXXO (FM), a radio station (91.5 FM) licensed to serve Rochester, New York, United States
- WXMJ, a radio station (104.5 FM) licensed to serve Cambridge Springs, Pennsylvania, United States, which held the call sign WXXO from 2000 to 2007
- WMHH, a radio station (96.7 FM) licensed to serve Clifton Park, New York, which held the call sign WXXO in 1996
- WLAA, a radio station (1600 AM) licensed to serve Winter Garden, Florida, United States, which held the call sign WXXO from 1988 to 1990
