= WBSL =

WBSL may refer to:

- WBSL-FM, a radio station (91.7 FM) licensed to Sheffield, Massachusetts, United States
- WMEJ, a radio station (1190 AM) licensed to Bay St. Louis, Mississippi, United States, which held the call sign WBSL from 1988 to 2009
