= WLYT =

WLYT may refer to:

- WLYT-LP, a low-power radio station (94.7 FM) licensed to serve Mooresville, North Carolina, United States
- WKJW, a radio station (1010 AM) licensed to Black Mountain, North Carolina, which carried the WLYT callsign in 2013
- WLKO, a radio station (102.9 FM) licensed to Hickory, North Carolina, which carried the WLYT callsign from 1995 to 2012
- WKRK-FM, a radio station (92.3 FM) licensed to Cleveland Heights, Ohio, United States, which carried the WLYT callsign from 1971 to 1983
- WFGW, a radio station (106.7 FM) licensed to Norris, Tennessee, United States, which carried the WLYT callsign from 2012 to 2013
- We Love You Tecca, a mixtape by American rapper Lil Tecca
