= WYAC =

WYAC may refer to:

- WYAC (AM), a radio station (930 AM) licensed to Cabo Rojo, Puerto Rico
- WYAC-FM, a radio station (93.5 FM) licensed to Christiansted, U.S. Virgin Islands
