= WAVL =

WAVL may refer to:

- WAVL (FM), a radio station (100.5 FM) licensed to serve Rothschild, Wisconsin, United States
- WJFA, a radio station (910 AM) licensed to serve Apollo, Pennsylvania, United States, which held the call sign WAVL from 1948 to 2018
