= WLAA (disambiguation) =

WLAA is a radio station in Winter Garden, Florida

WLAA may also refer to:

- Woman's Land Army of America, American civilian organization
- World League Against Alcoholism, worldwide prohibition organization
