= WIAC =

WIAC may refer to:

- WIAC (AM), a radio station (740 AM) licensed to San Juan, Puerto Rico
- WTOK-FM, a radio station (102.5 FM) licensed to San Juan, Puerto Rico, which held the call sign WIAC-FM until 2010
- Wisconsin Intercollegiate Athletic Conference
