= WKJV =

WKJV may refer to:

- WKJV (AM), a radio station (1380 AM) licensed to serve Asheville, North Carolina, United States
- WKJV-LP, a defunct radio station (106.5 FM) formerly licensed to serve Bristol, Virginia, United States
