= WDTX =

WDTX may refer to:

- United States District Court for the Western District of Texas
- WAVL (FM), a radio station (100.5 FM) licensed to serve Rothschild, Wisconsin, United States, which held the call sign WDTX from 2008 to 2019
- WDTX-FM, now known as WYCD in Detroit
