= WKCI =

WKCI is the callsign of two radio stations in the United States, both owned by Clear Channel Communications:

- WKCI (AM) (970 kHz AM), a talk radio station licensed to Waynesboro, Virginia serving the nearby Charlottesville area
- WKCI-FM (101.3 MHz FM), the longtime holder of the call letters, is a Contemporary Hit Radio station licensed to Hamden, Connecticut and serving much of Connecticut and Long Island
