= WYFX =

WYFX may refer to:

- WYFX-LD, a low-power television station (channel 32/virtual 62) licensed to Youngstown, Ohio, United States
- WMVI (FM), a radio station (106.7 FM) licensed to Mount Vernon, Indiana, United States, which held the call sign WYFX from 1999 to 2022
- WIRA, a radio station (1400 AM) licensed to Fort Pierce, Florida, United States, which held the call sign WYFX from 1996 to 1997
- WURN (AM), a radio station (1040 AM) licensed to Miami, Florida, which held the call sign WYFX from 1986 to 1996
