= 98 Rock =

There are several radio stations with the branding of 98 Rock:

- KRXQ in Sacramento, California
- WIYY in Baltimore, Maryland
- WXTB in Tampa, Florida
- KTAL-FM in Shreveport, Louisiana (98 Rocks)
- WACL in Elkton, Virginia

Actual Rocks:

- The 98 Rock - A stone on Wake Island marked after a massacre of 98 American POWs by the Japanese
