= WMAF =

WMAF can refer to:

- WMAF (Florida), a radio station (1230 AM) formerly licensed to serve Madison, Florida, United States, which operated from 1956 to 2026
- WMAF (Massachusetts), a radio station formerly licensed to serve South Dartmouth, Massachusetts, United States, which operated from 1922 to 1931
- Miscegenation
