= WLEY =

WLEY could refer to two radio stations:

- WLEY (AM), a radio station (1080 AM) licensed to Cayey, Puerto Rico.
- WLEY-FM, a radio station (107.9 FM) licensed to Aurora, Illinois, USA.
