= Wira =

Wira may refer to:

- WIRA, a radio station licensed to Fort Pierce, Florida, United States
- Proton Wira, a car
- Wira (film), a 2019 Malaysian film
