= WXTO =

WXTO may refer to:

- WGRD-FM, a radio station (97.9 FM) licensed to Grand Rapids, Michigan, which held the call sign WXTO from 1962 to 1971
- WBMJ, a radio station (1190 AM) licensed to San Juan, Puerto Rico, which held the call sign WXTO from 1984 to 1985
- WLAA, a radio station (1600 AM) licensed to Winter Garden, Florida, which held the call sign WXTO from 1990 to 1994
- WACC (AM), a radio station (830 AM) licensed to Hialeah, Florida, which held the call sign WXTO from 1995 to 1997
