= WIAC (AM) =

Radio station from San Juan, Puerto Rico

- San Juan, Puerto Rico; Puerto Rico
- Broadcast area: Puerto Rico
- Frequency: 740 kHz
- Branding: WIAC 740 AM

Programming
- Format: Talk radio and Spanish variety

Ownership
- Owner: Bestov Broadcast Group; (Bestov Broadcasting, Inc.)
- Sister stations: WYAC, WISA

History
- First air date: March 1947
- Former call signs: WIBS (1947–1951)
- Former frequencies: 580 kHz (1942–1951)
- Call sign meaning: West Indies Advertising Company

Technical information
- Licensing authority: FCC
- Facility ID: 4935
- Class: B
- Power: 10,000 watts (unlimited)
- Transmitter coordinates: 18°21′24″N 66°14′56″W

Links
- Public license information: Public file; LMS
- Website: wiac740.com

WIAC (740 AM) is a radio station broadcasting a talk and Spanish variety format. Licensed to San Juan, Puerto Rico, it serves the Puerto Rico area. The station is currently owned by Bestov Broadcast Group.

== History ==
Puerto Rico's first advertising agency, the West Indies Advertising Company (WIAC), was founded in San Juan in 1933, by the Abarca family, which also owned a successful structural steel company. By 1942 the advertisement agency's management founded WIAC at 580 kHz, with Félix Muñiz, the brother of Tomás Muñiz (and uncle of Tommy Muñiz, as its administrator. Due to the untimely death of Félix, Tomás became the station's administrator soon after.

WIAC operated on 580 kHz in San Juan from 1942 to 1947, a frequency later occupied by WKAQ. WIAC officially began operations in March 1947, moving to 740 AM, replacing WIBS in Santurce.

During the 1950s and 1970s, WIAC was the only radio station broadcasting weather forecasts every 10 minutes and public affairs programming.

In 1961, Bestov Broadcasting, Inc. (a radio company owned by Alan Mejía and his brother, Luis Mejía) acquired the station, along with WIAC-FM 102.5 FM (formerly Sistema 102), which began operations that same year. In 1962, Bestov acquired WISA 1390 AM in Isabela serving the western and north area, and it is owned by Mejia's subsidiary, Isabela Broadcasting, Inc., this serving as a satellite of WIAC. In 1982, WIAC changed its news programming, with the branding of "WIAC NotiReloj". In 1998, WIAC NotiReloj became Cadena Radio Puerto Rico, with a News/Talk format. In 1999, Bestov Broadcast Group acquired WEKO 930 (now WYAC) in Cabo Rojo from David Ortiz Cintron, a radio entrepreneur from Cabo Rojo, which becomes a repeater of WIAC. Bestov also acquired WTIL 1300 AM in Mayaguez and would become the repeater of WEKO until 2003.

In 2009, WIAC reached an agreement with Boricua-JE Broadcasting, inc., the station's licensee to change to Boricua 740.

On February 1, 2012 WIAC's owner Bestov Broadcast Group joined in an alliance with Noti-Luz, buying from Empower Media Group, forming Puerto Rico's only AM and FM news and talk station. The Noti-Luz Network consisted of WGIT 1660 AM in Canóvanas, WIAC 740 AM in San Juan/Ponce, WYAC 930 AM in Cabo Rojo/Mayagüez, WISA 1390 AM in Isabela, WJDZ 90.1 FM in Pastillo, WNNV 91.7 FM in San Germán, WEKO 1580 AM in Morovis and WXRF 1590 AM in Guayama.

On June 1, 2012, it changed its slogan from "Radio 740" to "Acción 740", later, "Acción Radio" with news at the top of the hour. that same month, WIAC was purchased by Héctor Marcano Martínez's subsidiary, Metro Media Broadcasting, which also owns WWXY-LD Channel 8.1 (Tiva TV) in San Juan.

On October 2, a legendary broadcast pioneer Alan Mejía and former owner Bestov Broadcast Group returned to WIAC and changed their news/talk programming to a Spanish Variety format as "WIAC 740 La Original". In November 2012, the station's programming was changed.

From March 2016 to June 2017, WIAC 740 AM broadcast Monday-Friday from 3AM to 10PM, Saturdays from 4AM to 11PM and Sundays from 5AM to 10PM, while its station website, WIAC740.com, continued operating during the overnight hours for additional programming.

In June 2017, WIAC 740 AM switched back to broadcast operations of 24 hours a day, 7 days a week. However, in August WIAC returned to broadcast operations until 10PM, on Saturdays from 4AM to 11PM and Sundays from 5AM until 9PM, due to the passage of Hurricane Maria, as WIAC was forced to reduce operations because of damages in the transmitter antenna caused by the Hurricane. WIAC reduced its operations from a Diesel generator until 6PM. In 2018, WIAC returned to its full 24-hour broadcast operation. However, in June, WIAC returned to reduced operations, ending their broadcast day at 6PM, occasionally on Wednesdays, Thursdays and weekends, at 7PM.

=== Synchronous relay station ===
Until late 2016, WIAC's programming was relayed through an experimental synchronous booster station that also transmitted on 740 kHz, WI2XAC in Ponce, which was originally licensed on November 24, 2009.

On November 29, 2016 the Federal Communications Commission (FCC) stated that WI2XAC's license would only be renewed for 6 months, after which the station would be deleted. The reason given was that the station had exceeded the 6 year maximum permitted for experimental authorizations.

A reconsideration petition was denied, and WI2XAC's license was deleted on November 30, 2016. As a result, WIAC's programming was no longer heard in southern Puerto Rico.
