= WDEP =

Radio station licensed to Ponce, Puerto Rico

- Ponce, Puerto Rico; Puerto Rico
- Broadcast area: Puerto Rico
- Frequency: 1490 kHz
- Branding: Radio Isla (WDEP) 1490

Programming
- Format: Talk radio

Ownership
- Owner: Media Power Group; (Media Power Group, Inc.)
- Sister stations: WSKN, WLEY, WKFE

History
- First air date: March 9, 1973
- Former call signs: WZBS (1973–1997); WLEO (1997–2002); WZUR (2002–2003)
- Call sign meaning: De Ponce

Technical information
- Licensing authority: FCC
- Facility ID: 74456
- Class: B
- Power: 5,800 watts (day); 1,000 watts (night)
- Transmitter coordinates: 17°58′52″N 66°36′51″W

Links
- Public license information: Public file; LMS
- Website: radioisla.tv

WDEP (1490 AM) is a radio station broadcasting a talk radio format. Licensed to Ponce, Puerto Rico, the station serves much of Puerto Rico. The station is currently owned by Media Power Group, Inc. and features programming from the Radio Isla Network.

WDEP has been granted an FCC construction permit to move to a new transmitter site, increase day power to 5,800 watts and increase night power to 1,000 watts.

== History ==
The station was assigned the callsign WZBS on 9 March 1973. On 23 June 1997, the station changed its call sign to WLEO, On 18 December 2002, to WZUR, and on 7 January 2003 to the current WDEP.

== Ownership ==
In July 1999, Uno Radio of Ponce Inc., Caguas, P.R. (Jesus M. Soto, chairman), reached an agreement to purchase five radio stations in Puerto Rico from Ponce Broadcasting Corp. (Janero G. Scarano Sr., Julio C. Braum, Luis F. Sala, Catalina Scarano and Sala Business Corp., shareholders) for a reported sale price of $10.75 million.

In June 2003, Media Power Group Inc. (Eduardo Rivero Albino, chairman, Gilberto Rivera Gutierrez, Jose E. Fernandez and Joe Pagan, shareholders) reached an agreement to purchase four AM radio stations in Puerto Rico, including WDEP, from Arso Radio Corp. (Jesus M. Soto, owner) for a reported $6.8 million.
