= WAZR =

Radio station in Woodstock, Virginia

- Woodstock, Virginia; United States
- Broadcast area: Harrisonburg, Virginia; Staunton, Virginia; Central Shenandoah Valley
- Frequency: 93.7 MHz
- Branding: 93-7 NOW

Programming
- Format: Contemporary hit radio
- Affiliations: Premiere Networks

Ownership
- Owner: iHeartMedia, Inc.; (iHM Licenses, LLC)
- Sister stations: WACL; WKCI; WKCY; WKCY-FM; WKDW; WSVO

History
- First air date: October 18, 1985
- Call sign meaning: "WAZ Radio" (from former sister station WAZT)

Technical information
- Licensing authority: FCC
- Facility ID: 57910
- Class: B1
- ERP: 15,500 watts
- HAAT: 128 meters (420 ft)
- Transmitter coordinates: 38°37′4.4″N 78°42′38.10″W

Links
- Public license information: Public file; LMS
- Webcast: Listen live (via iHeartRadio)
- Website: www.937now.com

WAZR is a contemporary hit radio formatted broadcast radio station licensed to Woodstock, Virginia, serving the Central Shenandoah Valley. WAZR is owned and operated by iHeartMedia, Inc.

== History ==
WAZR launched on October 18, 1985, and officially took its callsign on December 3. It was owned by Ruarch Associates, LLC of Woodstock, Virginia. The station would carry an adult standards format, branded as "Z-93". Ruarch sold WAZR to Clear Channel for $1.35 million in May 2001; the following year the adult standards format was moved from WAZR to WAMM at 1230 AM, while WAZR became a contemporary hit radio format, branded as "93.7 Kiss FM; The Valley's Hit Music". The station's tower was moved south into Rockingham County and puts a poor signal into Woodstock.

At noon on September 20, 2010, WAZR shifted to hot adult contemporary, branded as "Alice 93.7; Music of the 90s, 2K and Today". At the same time, the station dropped the syndicated "Elvis Duran and the Morning Show", which had been carried since May 4, 2009, from 6 to 10am. Elvis returned on July 11, 2011.

On September 5, 2011, WAZR reverted to its contemporary hit radio format, branded as "All The Hits; Alice 93-7". It would continue to keep the Alice name until noon on August 1, 2012, when it changed to "93-7 Hit Music NOW", keeping the contemporary hit radio format and was shortly thereafter shortened to "93-7 NOW; The Valley's Hit Music Station".
