= WEGA (AM) =

Radio station licensed to Vega Baja, Puerto Rico

Vega Baja, Puerto Rico; Puerto Rico
- Broadcast area: Puerto Rico area
- Frequency: 1350 kHz
- Branding: Candelita7

Programming
- Format: Religious

Ownership
- Owner: Eddie Rivera Hernández; (A Radio Company, Inc.)
- Operator: Ministerio en Pie de Guerra, Inc.
- Sister stations: WJDZ, WNNV

History
- First air date: February 20, 1973; 52 years ago
- Call sign meaning: Radio Las VEGAs

Technical information
- Licensing authority: FCC
- Facility ID: 69853
- Class: B
- Power: 2,500 watts
- Transmitter coordinates: 18°28′38.00″N 66°23′43.00″W

Links
- Public license information: Public file; LMS
- Website: candelita7.com

WEGA (1350 kHz, Candelita7) is an AM radio station licensed to Vega Baja, Puerto Rico. The station serves the Puerto Rico area. The station broadcasts religious programming. WEGA signed on the air on February 20, 1973. WEGA is owned by evangelist Eddie Rivera Hernández, through licensee A Radio Company, Inc. The station is operated under a Time Brokerage Agreement by Ministerio en Pie de Guerra, Inc.

On November 10, 2014, WEGA went off the air for almost a year after filing for Chapter 11 bankruptcy. On March 9. 2016, WEGA returned to air Faro de Santidad programming on 1350 AM, after a year of absence.

On February 7, 2018, WEGA switched to Candelita7, an online radio station owned by Rivera Hernández better known as "Candelita". Candelita7 airs on 1350 AM, and worldwide via internet: www.candelita7.com.
