= WSVO =

- Staunton, Virginia; United States
- Broadcast area: Staunton, Virginia; Harrisonburg, Virginia; Augusta County, Virginia
- Frequency: 93.1 MHz
- Branding: Mix 93-1

Programming
- Format: Adult contemporary
- Affiliations: Premiere Networks

Ownership
- Owner: iHeartMedia; (iHM Licenses, LLC)
- Sister stations: WACL, WAZR, WKCI, WKCY, WKCY-FM, WKDW

History
- First air date: May 29, 1959
- Former call signs: WSGM (1959–1992); WKDW-FM (1992–1996)
- Call sign meaning: W Shenandoah Valley Oldies former format

Technical information
- Licensing authority: FCC
- Facility ID: 11665
- Class: A
- ERP: 2,800 watts
- HAAT: 103 meters (338 ft)
- Transmitter coordinates: 38°10′32.0″N 79°4′12.0″W

Links
- Public license information: Public file; LMS
- Webcast: WSVO Webstream
- Website: WSVO Online

WSVO (93.1 FM) is an adult contemporary formatted broadcast radio station licensed to Staunton, Virginia and serving Staunton and Augusta County, Virginia. WSVO is owned and operated by iHeartMedia.

== History ==
WSVO first launched with the callsign WSGM on May 29, 1959, and carried a mainstream rock format.

The station became country on February 13, 1992, and changed the callsign to WKDW-FM, becoming a sister station of WKDW at 900 AM, which was also carrying a country format. WKDW-FM remained a sister station of WKDW until March 28, 1994, when the callsign for 900 AM was switched to WBGT. It was also around this time that the station's format was switched from a Country format to Oldies, branded as "Oldies 93.1".

On January 31, 1996, the WKDW callsign was reassigned to 900 AM, while 93.1 FM became WSVO. The station continued to carry its oldies format until 11:00 P.M. on April 3, 2005, when the format was changed to adult contemporary, branded as "Mix 93.1; The 80s to Now".

The station broadcasts in an all-Christmas format from mid-November through Christmas day.
