= WSKN =

Radio station in San Juan, Puerto Rico

- San Juan, Puerto Rico; Puerto Rico
- Broadcast area: San Juan, Puerto Rico
- Frequency: 1320 kHz
- Branding: Radio Isla 1320

Programming
- Format: News/Talk

Ownership
- Owner: Media Power Group; (Media Power Group, Inc.)
- Sister stations: WDEP, WKFE, WLEY

History
- First air date: October 15, 1949; 76 years ago
- Former call signs: WEMB (1949–1951); WRIO (1951–1962); WUNO (1962–2001); WSKN (2001–2002); WDEP (2002)
- Call sign meaning: Super Kadena Noticiosa

Technical information
- Licensing authority: FCC
- Class: B
- Power: 5,300 watts
- Transmitter coordinates: 18°11′24″N 66°52′22″W

Links
- Public license information: Public file; LMS
- Website: WSKN Online

WSKN (1320 AM), branded on-air Radio Isla 1320, is a radio station. WSKN serves San Juan, Puerto Rico and is owned by Media Power Group. The station serves as the flagship station of the Radio Isla Network and carries a Spanish-language news and talk format.

The callsign derives from their previous identification, Super Kadena Noticiosa, which was created on May 11, 1992, under the ownership of Radio Kadena Informativa Inc. The station was on frequency 630 AM. WUNO Notiuno bought them in 2000 and switched frequencies (Notiuno was on 1320 AM).

== History ==
=== Early years ===
The station's news director is Luis Penchi, a Ponce-born radio journalist with over 30 years of broadcast experience. Upon being hired by WSKN, he transferred his highly rated Saturday-morning news programming from WIAC, the Radio Puerto Rico network. The programming included a weekly political debate panel with former Senate President Kenneth McClintock, Senate PDP Minority Leader José Luis Dalmau and Movimiento Independentista Nacional Hostosiano (MINH) leader, Dr. Héctor Pesquera, and the "Luis Penchi Entrevista" 90-minute news interview program. During the week, Penchi attracted many of the islands' top political analysts to its programming, including attorneys Benny Frankie Cerezo, Carlos Gallisá and Ignacio Rivera, as well as businessman-turned-political-figure Adolfo Krans, the former First Spouse during his former wife Sila Calderón's gubernatorial administration. As a result, the station has been able to attract many of Puerto Rico's political 'cognoscenti' to its audience.

=== Recent news ===
On December 1, 2009, Penchi resigned from the position of news director, and news reporter Julio Rivera Saniel was named to replace him. Rivera Saniel had previously worked at WKAQ 580 and WAPA TV, and still works as an anchor/reporter on Telemundo's weekday newscasts (Telenoticias 4PM). On November 1, 2013, Jonathan Lebrón Ayala was named news director after Rivera Saniel resigned to the position he previously held from 2009. Lebrón Ayala is a young news reporter that was the multimedia editor of Metro in Puerto Rico, a daily free newspaper owned by Metro International. Also has worked with WKAQ, a Univision Radio Puerto Rico station and with El Nuevo Dia a newspaper owned by the Ferré Rangel family. Rivera Saniel would stay in WSKN with two new shows and later worked on WAPA-TV newscasts.

== Ownership ==
In June 2003, Media Power Group Inc. (Eduardo Rivero Albino, chairman, Gilberto Rivera Gutierrez, Jose E. Fernandez and Joe Pagan, shareholders) reached an agreement to purchase four AM radio stations in Puerto Rico, including WSKN, from Arso Radio Corp. (Jesus M. Soto, owner) for a reported $6.8 million.
