= WIRB =

Level Plains, Alabama; United States
- Broadcast area: Wiregrass Region
- Frequency: 1490 kHz
- Branding: Digital 1490

Programming
- Format: Urban oldies, talk

Ownership
- Owner: Arik Lev; (Fabiola Lev and Arik Lev, G.P.)

History
- First air date: 2006; 19 years ago
- Last air date: January 2024; 1 year ago
- Call sign meaning: Wiregrass or "Wiregrass Rhythm & Blues"

Technical information
- Licensing authority: FCC
- Facility ID: 129516
- Class: C
- Power: 1,000 watts
- Transmitter coordinates: 31°17′58.6″N 85°47′25.8″W

Links
- Public license information: Public file; LMS
- Website: www.digital1490am.com

WIRB (1490 AM) was a radio station licensed to serve Level Plains, Alabama, United States, a suburb of Dothan, Alabama. The station was owned by Fabiola Lev and Arik Lev, G.P.

== Programming ==
Digital 1490 WIRB broadcast a classic soul/R&B, talk and sports format.

== History ==
This station received its original license from the Federal Communications Commission (FCC) on December 11, 2006.

Co-Licensee Fabiola Lev is the former wife of Arik Lev, with the divorce finalized on May 20, 2019. According to the license transfer application, Fabiola is 80% owner of the general partnership that purchased the license for $5,000.

As of July 2019, the FCC had not been informed of any change in the ownership structure. Arik Lev stated on the application that he is a citizen of Israel. Non-citizen ownership of American radio licenses is limited to 20%, so he was in compliance with section 310(b) of the FCC rules.

While the FCC approved the license transfer in December 2018, the actual transfer was not completed until June 20, 2019.

In October 2020 WIRB changed their format to classic soul/R&B, talk and sports, branded as "Digital 1490".

The FCC cancelled the station’s license on July 9, 2024. The station had filed to go silent in January, which had been followed by comments to the FCC that WIRB had been off the air for years and its facilities dismantled over a year earlier.

== Unrelated licenses ==
This WIRB is unrelated to the WIRB formerly licensed to Enterprise that broadcast at 600 kHz from 1948 to 1988. That station changed its call letters to WLHQ on May 11, 1988, before going off the air for good. It was deleted from the FCC database on May 13, 1992.

This radio station is also unrelated to the television station in Melbourne, Florida, that used the WIRB callsign from May 1, 1992, until February 13, 1998, when it became WOPX.
