= WNTF =

Radio station in Bithlo–Orlando, Florida, United States

- Bithlo, Florida; United States
- Broadcast area: Orlando
- Frequency: 1580 kHz
- Branding: Cultural Vibrations

Programming
- Format: Caribbean

Ownership
- Owner: Shanti Persaud; (Unity Broadcasting LLC)
- Sister stations: WKIQ; WLAA; WOKB

History
- First air date: 1958
- Former call signs: WMDF; WVGT; WGTW (1973–1981); WHTZ (1981–1983); WBGB (1983–1997); WLAA (2017–2018)

Technical information
- Licensing authority: FCC
- Facility ID: 14556
- Class: D
- Power: 1000 watts day only
- Transmitter coordinates: 28°32′12″N 81°5′5.2″W
- Translator: (92.7 MHz) W224DY (Bithlo)

Links
- Public license information: Public file; LMS
- Website: www.cvr247.com

WNTF (1580 AM) is a radio station broadcasting a Caribbean music format. It is licensed to Bithlo, Florida, United States, and serves the Greater Orlando area. The station is owned by Shanti Persaud, through licensee Unity Broadcasting LLC.
