= WRNZ =

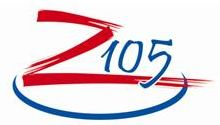
- Lancaster, Kentucky; United States
- Broadcast area: Lancaster; Danville; Nicholasville; Lexington
- Frequency: 105.1 MHz
- Branding: Z105

Programming
- Format: Hot adult contemporary

Ownership
- Owner: Hometown Broadcasting of Lancaster, Inc.
- Sister stations: WHBN, WHIR

History
- First air date: October 1, 1988; 37 years ago
- Former call signs: WHBK (1987–1988); WTCF (1988–1988)
- Call sign meaning: The Z in WRNZ is used in "Z105" branding

Technical information
- Licensing authority: FCC
- Facility ID: 27548
- Class: A
- ERP: 3,000 watts
- HAAT: 100 meters
- Transmitter coordinates: 37°36′6″N 84°34′27″W

Links
- Public license information: Public file; LMS
- Website: hometownlive.net

WRNZ (105.1 FM, "Z105") is a radio station broadcasting a hot adult contemporary format. Owned by Hometown Broadcasting of Lancaster, Kentucky, Z105 has stations in Danville, Lancaster, and Harrodsburg. The station serves the Lexington and Central Kentucky area. Their main studio of operations is the Hometown radio station in Danville, Kentucky.

== History ==
The station originally went on the air as WHBK on December 8, 1987. On February 2, 1988, the station changed its call sign to WTCF, then on June 7, 1988, Z105 changed to the current call sign, WRNZ.
