= WAFC (AM) =

Radio station in Clewiston, Florida

- Clewiston, Florida; United States
- Broadcast area: Hendry County
- Frequency: 590 kHz
- Branding: Pure Country WAFC

Programming
- Language: English
- Format: Classic Country
- Affiliations: Florida Gators football network

Ownership
- Owner: Glades Media Group; (Glades Media Company LLP)
- Sister stations: WJNX-FM

History
- First air date: February 16, 1988

Technical information
- Licensing authority: FCC
- Facility ID: 24229
- Class: B
- Power: 930 watts (day); 470 watts (night)
- Transmitter coordinates: 26°43′46.00″N 80°54′49.00″W
- Translator: See § Translators

Links
- Public license information: Public file; LMS
- Webcast: Listen live
- Website: www.wafcfm.com

WAFC (590 AM, "Pure Country") is a commercial radio station licensed to Clewiston, Florida, United States, and serving Hendry County. Owned by Glades Media Group, it airs a classic country format and carries University of Florida Gators football games. Studios and offices are located on North Park Street in Okeechobee.

WAFC programming is also heard on three FM translators in Clewiston (100.5), LaBelle (105.1) and Belle Glade (92.5).

== History ==
The station signed on the air on February 16, 1988. It has always had the WAFC call sign and has always been owned by Glades Media. It came on the air nine years after its sister station debuted, at the time 106.3 WAFC-FM Clewiston and today 106.1 WJNX-FM Okeechobee.

In its early years, the station played Regional Mexican music with the branding Radio Fiesta. It also spent time playing country music, handing off the Regional Mexican format to its co-owned FM station.

In the 2010s, WAFC carried the nationally syndicated "True Oldies Channel" from Cumulus Media Networks. On June 30, 2014, Cumulus Media stopped distributing the TOC network. At that point, WAFC switched to Westwood One's "Classic Hits Radio" service.

On December 26, 2018, WAFC changed its format from classic hits to classic country music. It took the branding "Pure Country WAFC".

== Translators ==
Broadcast translators for WAFC
Call sign	Frequency	City of license	FID	ERP (W)	HAAT	Class	FCC info
W223AJ	92.5 FM	Belle Glade, Florida	139076	250	133 m (436 ft)	D	LMS
W263BT	100.5 FM	Clewiston, Florida	61505	250	170 m (558 ft)	D	LMS
W286DO	105.1 FM	LaBelle, Florida	202719	250	118 m (387 ft)	D	LMS
