= WJOT-FM =

- Wabash, Indiana; United States
- Broadcast area: Wabash, Indiana; Huntington, Indiana; Peru, Indiana
- Frequency: 105.9 MHz
- Branding: 105.9 The Bash

Programming
- Format: Oldies

Ownership
- Owner: Dream Weaver Marketing, LLC

History
- First air date: July 1, 1993
- Former call signs: WWIP (1993–1998)

Technical information
- Licensing authority: FCC
- Facility ID: 13537
- Class: A
- ERP: 6,000 watts
- HAAT: 97 meters (318 ft)
- Transmitter coordinates: 40°49′54″N 85°48′36″W

Links
- Public license information: Public file; LMS
- Webcast: Listen live
- Website: 1059thebash.com

WJOT-FM (105.9 FM) is a radio station licensed to Wabash, Indiana broadcasting an oldies format. The station serves the areas of Wabash, Indiana, Huntington, Indiana, and Peru, Indiana, and is owned by Dream Weaver Marketing, LLC.

== History ==
The station began broadcasting July 1, 1993, and originally held the call sign WWIP. The station aired an adult contemporary/CHR format. In July 1998, the station's call sign was changed to WJOT-FM and the station adopted an oldies format.

WJOT-FM's programming was simulcast on WJOT (1510 AM) until the AM station's closure in December 2025.

== Technical ==
Transmitter is the venerable 5,000 watt Harris model HT-5FM utilizing a single high power air-cooled metal/ceramic tetrode vacuum tube (type number 4CX3500A) as its final RF amplifier stage. The audio path is purely analog based, with an emphasis on fidelity vs. compression.
