= WKWL =

- Florala, Alabama; United States
- Broadcast area: Andalusia, Alabama
- Frequency: 1230 kHz

Programming
- Format: Classic pop

Ownership
- Owner: Florala Broadcasting Co., Inc.
- Sister stations: WGYV

History
- First air date: 1982

Technical information
- Licensing authority: FCC
- Facility ID: 21743
- Class: C
- Power: 1,000 watts (unlimited)
- Transmitter coordinates: 31°00′20″N 86°19′53″W

Links
- Public license information: Public file; LMS

WKWL (1230 AM) is a radio station licensed to serve the community of Florala, Alabama. The station is owned by Florala Broadcasting Co., Inc. It airs a classic pop format to the central Florida Panhandle and central southern Alabama.

== History ==
This station received its original construction permit from the Federal Communications Commission on December 18, 1978. The new station was assigned the WKWL call letters by the Federal Communications Commission in 1979. WKWL received its license to cover from the FCC on May 28, 1982.

== Alumni ==
Former on-air personnel include disc jockey Gary Scott Thomas.
