= WGFC =

Radio station in Floyd, Virginia

- Floyd, Virginia; United States
- Broadcast area: Floyd, Virginia; Floyd County, Virginia
- Frequency: 1030 kHz
- Branding: New Life Christian Radio

Programming
- Format: Southern gospel

Ownership
- Owner: New Life Christian Communications, Inc.
- Sister stations: WHHV

History
- First air date: April 20, 1985
- Call sign meaning: Floyd County

Technical information
- Licensing authority: FCC
- Facility ID: 23044
- Class: D
- Power: 1,000 watts (days only)
- Transmitter coordinates: 36°55′33.0″N 80°16′34.0″W

Links
- Public license information: Public file; LMS
- Webcast: Listen live
- Website: newlifechurchandministries.net/radio

WGFC is a Southern Gospel-formatted broadcast radio station licensed to Floyd, Virginia, USA, serving Floyd and Floyd County. WGFC is owned and operated by New Life Christian Communications, Inc.
