= WHIR =

- Danville, Kentucky; United States
- Frequency: 1230 kHz
- Branding: Newstalk Sports 1230

Programming
- Format: News Talk Information
- Affiliations: NBC News Radio; SportsMap; USA Radio Network; Premiere Networks; Kentucky Sports Radio; Danville High School; Motor Racing Network; Performance Racing Network

Ownership
- Owner: Hometown Broadcasting of Danville Inc
- Sister stations: WHBN, WRNZ

History
- First air date: October 27, 1947; 79 years ago

Technical information
- Licensing authority: FCC
- Facility ID: 52308
- Class: C
- Power: 1,000 watts
- Transmitter coordinates: 37°40′26″N 84°45′57″W
- Translator: 103.9 W280FM (Danville)

Links
- Public license information: Public file; LMS
- Webcast: Listen Live
- Website: hometownlive.net

WHIR (1230 AM) is a News Talk Information–formatted radio station licensed to Danville, Kentucky, United States. The station is currently owned by Hometown Broadcasting of Danville Inc. as part of a triopoly with Harrodsburg–licensed country music station WHBN (1420 AM) and Lancaster–licensed hot adult contemporary station WRNZ (105.1 FM). WHIR's transmitter and studio facilities for all three stations are located on Shakertown Road (KY 33) north of Danville. WHIR features The Joe Mathis Show which can be heard Monday through Friday from 6-9 am. Sean Hannity, Dave Ramsey, and other nationwide syndicated shows are also carried, along with area and local sporting events.

== History ==
WHIR went on-the-air in 1947 under the stewardship of W.T. Isaac and David B. Highbaugh. In 1959, the station was sold to a group of businessmen from Lexington, Kentucky. Ten years later, the station aired a Top 40 contemporary hit radio format when a companion FM station signed-on (107.1 FM, now Wilmore–licensed WLAI).

In 1987, WHIR and now-WMGE were purchased by WHAS talent Wayne Perkey, joined later in ownership by WAKY alum Johnny Randolph. In 1995, WHIR/WMGE were sold to Hometown Broadcasters of Lancaster, owner of WRNZ.

Logo before translator sign on

== Programming ==
WHIR airs a hybrid of locally–sourced and syndicated programming. Outsourced programs include Kentucky Sports Radio from WLAP in Lexington, The Sean Hannity Show from Premiere Networks, and The Ramsey Show. Locally, the station broadcasts high school football games from Danville High School in the fall. WHIR also maintains affiliations with the Motor Racing Network and Performance Racing Network for NASCAR races.
