= WJDZ =

Pastillo, Puerto Rico; Puerto Rico
- Broadcast area: Puerto Rico
- Frequency: 90.1 MHz
- Branding: Candelita7

Programming
- Format: Religious

Ownership
- Owner: Juan Esteban Diaz; (Siembra Fertil P.R., Inc.)
- Operator: Ministerio En Pie de Guerra, Inc.
- Sister stations: WEGA, WNNV

History
- First air date: March 15, 2005; 20 years ago
- Former call signs: WWQS (1996–2006)
- Call sign meaning: Juana DiaZ

Technical information
- Licensing authority: FCC
- Facility ID: 83299
- Class: A
- ERP: 240 watts
- HAAT: −42.0 meters (−137.8 ft)
- Transmitter coordinates: 17°59′42.9″N 66°27′38.7″W

Links
- Public license information: Public file; LMS
- Website: candelita7.com

WJDZ (90.1 FM) is a radio station broadcasting a Contemporary Christian format. Licensed to Pastillo, Puerto Rico, the station serves the Puerto Rico area. The station is currently owned by Juan Esteban Díaz, through licensee; Siembra Fertil P.R., Inc. The station is operated under a Time Brokerage Agreement by Ministerio En Pie de Guerra, Inc.

== History ==
The station went on the air as WWQS on September 9, 1996. On July 6, 2006, the station changed its call sign to the current WJDZ.
