= WJNX (AM) =

- Fort Pierce, Florida; United States
- Broadcast area: Treasure Coast
- Frequency: 1330 kHz
- Branding: La Ley

Programming
- Language: Spanish
- Format: Regional Mexican

Ownership
- Owner: Glades Media Group; (Glades Media Company LLP)
- Sister stations: WJNX-FM

History
- First air date: December 24, 1952 (as WARN)
- Former call signs: WARN (1952–1974); WFTP (1974–1987); WDKC (1987–1991)
- Call sign meaning: derived from former sister station WJNO

Technical information
- Licensing authority: FCC
- Facility ID: 20437
- Class: B
- Power: 5,000 watts day; 1,000 watts night
- Transmitter coordinates: 27°27′21.1″N 80°22′1.2″W
- Translator: (95.1 MHz) W236AO (Fort Pierce)

Links
- Public license information: Public file; LMS
- Webcast: Listen live
- Website: wjnxfm.com

WJNX (1330 AM) is a radio station broadcasting a regional Mexican format. Licensed to Fort Pierce, Florida, United States, the station is owned by Glades Media Group.

== History ==
The station signed on as WARN on December 24, 1952, as an ABC affiliate. It was the second station to serve Fort Pierce following WIRA.
