= WLAG =

- La Grange, Georgia; United States
- Frequency: 1240 kHz
- Branding: Eagle Sports 1240 & 96.9

Programming
- Format: Sports
- Affiliations: Infinity Sports Network

Ownership
- Owner: Eagle's Nest, Inc.
- Sister stations: WLWE, WELR-FM

History
- First air date: 1941
- Call sign meaning: W LA Grange

Technical information
- Licensing authority: FCC
- Facility ID: 32980
- Class: C
- Power: 1,000 watts unlimited
- Transmitter coordinates: 33°2′24.00″N 85°1′27.00″W
- Translator: 96.9 W245AW (La Grange)

Links
- Public license information: Public file; LMS
- Website: WLAG Online

WLAG (1240 AM, "Eagle Sports 1240 & 96.9") is a radio station broadcasting a sports format featuring programming from ESPN Radio. WLAG is licensed to serve the community of La Grange, Georgia, United States. The station is currently owned by Eagle's Nest, Inc.

== History ==
WLAG's first license was granted on May 5, 1941. From 1941 to 1987, the station was owned and managed by Edwin Mullinax.

(The WLAG call sign had been used by other broadcasters. From 1922 to 1924, it was used for the precursor to WCCO in Minneapolis, Minnesota, one of the Upper Midwest's most notable broadcasters.)

== Previous logo ==
WLAG's logo under previous ESPN affiliation
