= WHIE =

Griffin, Georgia; United States
- Broadcast area: Atlanta, Georgia
- Frequency: 1320 kHz
- Branding: Power Country

Programming
- Format: Defunct (was Country music, local programming, news)
- Affiliations: Real Country, NBC Radio

Ownership
- Owner: Chappell Communications, LLC

History
- First air date: 1952
- Last air date: April 1, 2020
- Former call signs: WRHT (1952–1954)
- Call sign meaning: We're Helpful... Informative... and Entertaining!

Technical information
- Facility ID: 65005
- Class: D
- Power: 5,000 watts (day); 83 watts (night)
- Transmitter coordinates: 33°14′30.00″N 84°18′17.00″W

WHIE (1320 AM) was a radio station broadcasting a country music format. Licensed to Griffin, Georgia, United States, it served the Atlanta area. The station was last owned by Chappell Communications, LLC and featured programming from NBC Radio and the Real Country Radio Network.

== History ==
Robert H. Thompson Sr., trading as Griffin Broadcasting System, obtained a construction permit for a 1,000-watt, daytime-only radio station in Griffin on August 13, 1952. The station began broadcasting that December. In 1954, Thompson sold the station to Virginia Price Bowen; the transfer was part of a transaction by which Thompson became full owner of WWNS in Statesboro, which the two had jointly owned. Price Bowen changed the call letters to WHIE on April 19, 1954. WHIE was sold twice in the ensuing three years, to Gateway Broadcasters in 1956 and Telerad, Inc., in 1957; the Williams family acquired control of the station the next year and retained it until Fred L. Watkins became majority owner in 1975.

Watkins sold the station to its last owner, Chappell Communications, in 1998 for $240,000. The station ceased operations on April 1, 2020, in the wake of the death of owner Robert Chappell the year before. Its license was cancelled on June 21, 2021.
