= WIMS =

- Michigan City, Indiana; United States
- Broadcast area: Chicago and Northwest Indiana
- Frequency: 1420 kHz
- Branding: WIMS am1420 95.1fm

Programming
- Format: Classic hits, news/talk
- Affiliations: Compass Media Networks

Ownership
- Owner: Gerard Media, LLC
- Sister stations: WHFB

History
- First air date: August 10, 1947

Technical information
- Licensing authority: FCC
- Facility ID: 39383
- Class: B
- Power: 5,000 watts
- Transmitter coordinates: 41°40′40.14″N 86°56′10.11″W
- Translators: 95.1 W236BD (Michigan City); 106.7 W294CY (Valparaiso)

Links
- Public license information: Public file; LMS
- Webcast: Listen live
- Website: www.wimsradio.com

WIMS (1420 AM) is a radio station in Michigan City, Indiana, and serves the northwest Indiana listening area. Its format is primarily classic hits music, news, talk and sports. The station is currently owned by Gerard Media, LLC.

WIMS has been broadcasting live from Michigan City since 1947, having begun broadcasting August 8 of that year on 1420 kHz with 1 kW power (daytime only). It was licensed to Northern Indiana Broadcasters Inc. Most recently it is run by Ric Federighi and his brothers of Gerard Media LLC.

WIMS is an affiliate of the Grand Valley State Laker football radio network.

WIMS is also broadcast over two translators, W236BD 95.1 in Michigan City, and W294CY 106.7 in Valparaiso.

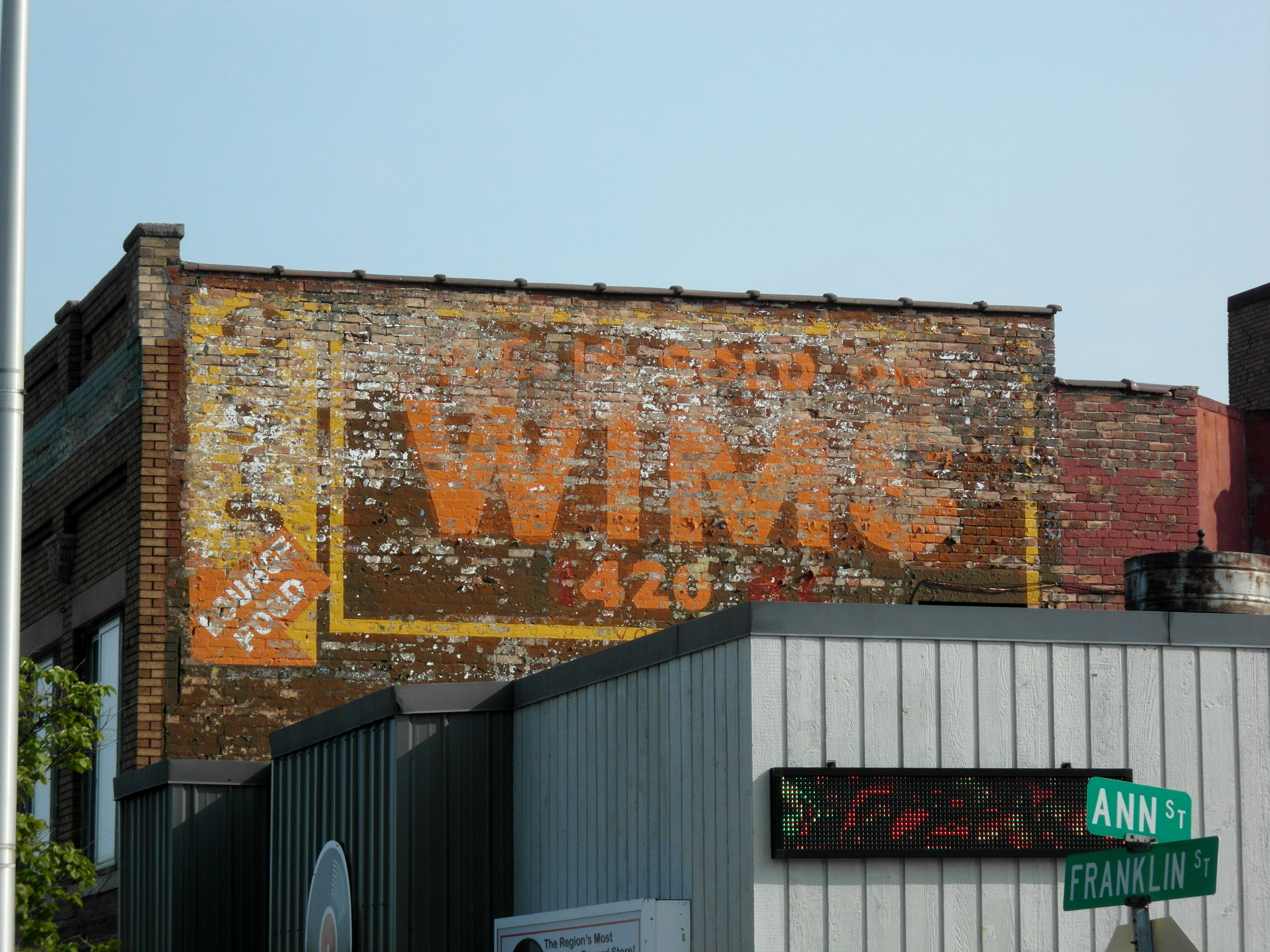
Ghost sign in Michigan City, advertising WIMS

== Translators ==
Call sign	Frequency	City of license	FID	ERP (W)	Class	Transmitter coordinates	FCC info
W236BD	95.1 FM	Michigan City, Indiana	143871	140	D	41°40′7.1″N 86°48′21.1″W	LMS
W294CY	106.7 FM	Valparaiso, Indiana	202526	160 vertical	D	41°31′22″N 87°1′28″W	LMS
