= WKCY-FM =

- Harrisonburg, Virginia; United States
- Broadcast area: Central Shenandoah Valley
- Frequency: 104.3 MHz
- Branding: 104-3 KCY Country

Programming
- Format: Country
- Affiliations: Motor Racing Network; Performance Racing Network; Premiere Networks

Ownership
- Owner: iHeartMedia, Inc.; (iHM Licenses, LLC)
- Sister stations: WKCY; WKCI; WAZR; WACL; WSVO; WKDW

History
- First air date: November 1980
- Former call signs: WGBK (1980–1980); WJSY (1980–1988)
- Call sign meaning: play on the word "country"

Technical information
- Licensing authority: FCC
- Facility ID: 41811
- Class: B
- ERP: 50,000 watts
- HAAT: 125 meters (410 ft)
- Transmitter coordinates: 38°23′47.4″N 79°8′27.1″W

Links
- Public license information: Public file; LMS
- Webcast: Listen live (via iHeartRadio)
- Website: kcycountry.iheart.com

WKCY-FM is a country formatted broadcast radio station licensed to Harrisonburg, Virginia, serving the Central Shenandoah Valley. WKCY-FM is owned and operated by iHeartMedia, Inc.
