= WJPI =

DWJPI
Plymouth, North Carolina; United States
- Frequency: 1470 kHz

Programming
- Format: Defunct (Urban gospel)

Ownership
- Owner: 24-7 Communications, LLC

History
- Former call signs: DWJPI (2004–2000)

Technical information
- Facility ID: 52736
- Class: D
- Power: 5,000 watts day
- Transmitter coordinates: 35°50′48.00″N 76°45′22.00″W

WJPI (1470 AM) was an Urban Gospel radio station formerly licensed to Plymouth, North Carolina, United States. The station was owned by 24-7 Communications, LLC.

WJPI went silent on April 1, 2011. On September 28, 2012, the Federal Communications Commission (FCC) cancelled the station's license and deleted the WJPI call sign from its database.
