= WJMT =

- Merrill, Wisconsin; United States
- Broadcast area: Wausau, Wisconsin; Stevens Point, Wisconsin; Tomahawk, Wisconsin
- Frequency: 730 kHz
- Branding: Bluejay 96.3

Programming
- Format: Oldies

Ownership
- Owner: Steven Resnick; (Sunrise Broadcasting LLC.)
- Sister stations: WAVL

History
- First air date: May 19, 1960
- Former call signs: WXMT (1960–1973)

Technical information
- Licensing authority: FCC
- Facility ID: 57222
- Class: D
- Power: 1,000 watts day; 127 watts night
- Transmitter coordinates: 45°10′45″N 89°38′20″W
- Translator: 96.3 W242CZ (Merrill)

Links
- Public license information: Public file; LMS
- Webcast: Listen live
- Website: bluejay963.com

WJMT (730 AM, "Bluejay 96.3") is a radio station broadcasting an oldies format. Licensed to Merrill, Wisconsin, United States, the station serves the Wausau-Stevens Point area. The station is owned by Steven Resnick, through licensee Sunrise Broadcasting LLC.
