= WISA =

Radio station in Isabela, Puerto Rico

- Isabela, Puerto Rico; Puerto Rico
- Frequency: 1390 kHz
- Branding: WISA 1390am

Programming
- Format: Spanish News/Talk
- Affiliations: WIAC 740

Ownership
- Owner: Radio Noroeste Broadcasting; (Isabela Broadcasting Inc.)
- Sister stations: WIAC, WYAC

History
- First air date: October 19, 1961
- Call sign meaning: ISAbela

Technical information
- Licensing authority: FCC
- Facility ID: 29218
- Class: B
- Power: 10,000 watts unlimited
- Transmitter coordinates: 18°30′6.00″N 67°52′1.00″W

Links
- Public license information: Public file; LMS
- Website: wisa1390am.com

WISA (1390 AM) is a radio station broadcasting a Spanish News/Talk format. It is licensed to Isabela, Puerto Rico. The station serves as a semi-satellite for WIAC 740 and is currently owned by Radio Noroeste Broadcasting, a subsidiary of Bestov Broadcast Group. It airs a News/Talk format.

WISA as a semi-satellite of WIAC, produces local programming from the studios located in Isabela, covering the Northern and Western area.

Former logo
