= WKDW (AM) =

- Staunton, Virginia; United States
- Broadcast area: Staunton, Virginia; Augusta County, Virginia
- Frequency: 900 kHz
- Branding: 900 WKDW

Programming
- Format: Classic country

Ownership
- Owner: iHeartMedia, Inc.; (iHM Licenses, LLC)
- Sister stations: WACL; WAZR; WKCI; WKCY; WKCY-FM; WSVO

History
- First air date: April 29, 1954
- Former call signs: WAFC (1954–1974); WKDW (1974–1994); WBGT (1994); WINF (1994–1996)

Technical information
- Licensing authority: FCC
- Facility ID: 11666
- Class: D
- Power: 2,500 watts (day); 120 watts (night)
- Transmitter coordinates: 38°10′32″N 79°4′12″W

Links
- Public license information: Public file; LMS
- Webcast: Listen live (via iHeartRadio)
- Website: wkdwam.com

WKDW is a classic country formatted broadcast radio station licensed to Staunton, Virginia, serving Staunton and Augusta County, Virginia. WKDW is owned and operated by iHeartMedia, Inc.
