= WACL =

- Elkton, Virginia; United States
- Broadcast area: Harrisonburg, Virginia; Staunton, Virginia; Waynesboro, Virginia
- Frequency: 98.5 MHz
- Branding: 98 Rock

Programming
- Format: Classic rock
- Affiliations: Premiere Networks

Ownership
- Owner: iHeartMedia; (iHM Licenses, LLC)
- Sister stations: WAZR, WKCI, WKCY, WKCY-FM, WKDW, WSVO

History
- First air date: March 6, 1989
- Former call signs: WVLC (1987–1989); WPKZ (1989–1997)
- Call sign meaning: Station branded as "Cool"

Technical information
- Licensing authority: FCC
- Facility ID: 63491
- Class: B1
- ERP: 900 watts
- HAAT: 490 meters (1,610 ft)
- Transmitter coordinates: 38°23′36.0″N 78°46′14.0″W

Links
- Public license information: Public file; LMS
- Webcast: Listen live (via iHeartRadio)
- Website: 98rockme.iheart.com

WACL is a classic rock-formatted broadcast radio station licensed to Elkton, Virginia, serving Harrisonburg, Staunton and Waynesboro in Virginia. WACL is owned and operated by iHeartMedia, Inc.

== History ==
=== Pre-launch ===
The history of WACL begins on October 15, 1983, when Robert James Lacey applied for a construction permit to build a radio station licensed to Elkton, Virginia. The application asked that the station air on 98.3 FM and broadcast with an ERP of 3,000 watts. Lacey's application was returned on January 22, 1984, for undetermined reasons. On April 2, 1984, another company, Elkton Broadcasters, Inc. filed their own construction permit, also requesting use of the 98.3 FM frequency and to operate at 3,000 watts. Elkton Broadcasters, Inc. was operated by Pamela Joan Davis, her brother Fred W. Greaves Jr., and their father, Fred W. Greaves Sr.

On March 4, 1987, Administrative law judge Joseph B. Gonzalez held oral argument an appeal to determine whether the approval of Lacey's application (now operating as Stonewall Broadcasting Company) and the rejection of Elkton's was proper. Stonewall Broadcasting Company retained the license, applying for the WVLC call sign in late-July 1987. On September 22, 1988, the Federal Communications Commission (FCC) amended the Table of allotments, moving the new station from 98.3 FM to 98.5 FM. The station's call sign was changed on February 22, 1989, to WPKZ.

=== Post-launch ===
On March 6, 1989, WPKZ began broadcasting for the first time, carrying an adult contemporary format known as "The Peak". The Radio Futures Committee awarded WPKZ an "Honorable Mention" for Excellence in Creative Commercial Production on January 19, 1990. In late April 1990, M. Belmont VerStandig agreed to "program and advertise" Stonewall Broadcasting Company.-owned WPKZ for 10 years. By 1994, WPKZ had switched from an Adult Contemporary format to a Country format, as "Z-98".

On March 7, 1997, the station's call sign changed from WPKZ to its current WACL. and switched from Country to an Oldies and Classic Hits format, as "Cool 98.5", playing hits from the 1960s and 1970s. In early August 1997, Stonewall Broadcasting Company sold WACL to Mid-Atlantic Network, Inc. for $1.75 million. WACL joined current sister stations WKCY and WKCY-FM. The deal was approved by the FCC on August 26, 1997, and the transaction became final on September 2, 1997.

In early January 2001, Mid-Atlantic Network, Inc. sold WACL, along with sisters WKCY and WKCY-FM to Clear Channel Communications for $7.2 million. The deal was approved by the FCC on March 12, 2001, and the transaction closed on March 30, 2001. At midnight on May 2, 2001, WACL debuted its current "98 Rock; The Valley's Rock Station". Originally carrying a Mainstream Rock format, WACL has since segued to classic rock, competing with WWWV circa 2015.
