= WGMI =

- Bremen, Georgia; United States
- Frequency: 1440 kHz

Programming
- Format: Christian music; sports radio

Ownership
- Owner: Garner Ministries, Inc.

History
- First air date: 1958
- Last air date: 2023
- Former call signs: WWCC (1958-1982); WSLE (1982–1989); WBKI (1989–1993)
- Call sign meaning: Garner Ministries, Inc.

Technical information
- Licensing authority: FCC
- Facility ID: 57385
- Class: D
- Power: 2,500 watts day; 62 watts night
- Transmitter coordinates: 33°42′56″N 85°9′34″W

Links
- Public license information: Public file; LMS

WGMI (1440 AM) was a radio station broadcasting a Christian music and sports radio format, licensed to Bremen, Georgia, United States. The station was owned by Garner Ministries, Inc.

== History ==
The station went on the air as WWCC (World Wide Clothing Company) in 1958, owned by Marlin Lamar. It changed format many times, but was known to be the starting point for famous air personalities including Rhubarb Jones, Keith Jackson and current Los Angeles area personality Rick Ruhl.

It became WSLE on November 11, 1982, with a top 40 format and was changed to oldies in 1985. On May 22, 1989, the station changed its call sign to WBKI, and on December 6, 1993, to WGMI, broadcasting Christian music and programming.

From 2006 to 2022, the station was the home of Bremen High School athletics, covering mainly football but also baseball, basketball, and wrestling, featuring Tom "The Big E" Eriquezzo.

WGMI switched to classic hits in 2010, then returned to a Christian music format in 2012 with a mix of southern gospel and contemporary Christian and brokered religious programming on Sundays, retaining an oldies show on Saturdays.

In 2019, WGMI added Fox Sports Radio (including The Dan Patrick Show) during weekday daytime hours, interspersed with local sports talk shows focused on West Georgia athletics, and carry Georgia Southern football in the fall. Horace Garner was station manager, Jerry Segal was operations manager, and Erriquezo handled sports programming. WGMI broadcast at 2,500 watts daytime and 62 watts at night.

As of 2023, WGMI was no longer operational. The property was sold and broadcasting equipment was dismantled. Bremen High School sports coverage is now covered by WBHS Radio and occasionally West Georgia TV (WGTV), both operating subsidies of Quezzo Productions, which is owned by former WGMI play by play announcer Tom Eriquezzo. The Federal Communications Commission cancelled the station's license on June 24, 2024.
