= WGYV =

- Greenville, Alabama; United States
- Broadcast area: Butler County, Alabama
- Frequency: 1380 kHz

Programming
- Format: Talk radio

Ownership
- Owner: Robert John Williamson
- Sister stations: WKWL

History
- First air date: August 18, 1948

Technical information
- Licensing authority: FCC
- Facility ID: 7902
- Class: D
- Power: 1,000 watts (days only)
- Transmitter coordinates: 31°50′01″N 86°36′07″W

Links
- Public license information: Public file; LMS

WGYV (1380 AM) is a radio station licensed to serve Greenville, Alabama, United States. The station, established in August 1948, is currently owned by Robert John Williamson. In August 2008, WGYV was granted a construction permit to relocate to the Cincinnati suburb of Aurora, Indiana, but the move was not completed before the permit expired in August 2011. As of August 2013, WGYV is still broadcasting in Alabama.

== Programming ==
WGYV broadcasts a conservative-leaning talk radio format featuring a mix of local and syndicated programming. Local programs include a weekday morning hour of sports talk called "Talking Sports with Big C" hosted by Colin MacGuire, and a weekend block hosted by Carolyn Griffin called "The Kingdom Building Broadcasting Network". Syndicated programs include talk shows hosted by Laura Ingraham, Rush Limbaugh, Sean Hannity, and Michael Savage.

== History ==
=== The beginning ===
This radio station, Greenville's first, began regular operations on August 18, 1948, broadcasting with 250 watts of power on a frequency of 1400 kHz. The station was assigned the WGYV call letters by the Federal Communications Commission. The WGYV license holder, Greenville Broadcasting Company, was owned by a partnership of E. Vernon Stabler, Calvin Poole, and S.W. Ferrel, Jr. In 1950, William H. Miller, Jr. took over as the station's general manager.

=== Move to 1380 ===
In 1956, WGYV received authorization from the FCC to change its broadcast frequency from 1400 to 1380 kHz. This change allowed the station to increase its daytime signal strength to 1,000 watts but forced WGYV to switch to daytime-only operation. At the time of the shift, J.D. Bell was serving as WGYV's chief engineer.

WGYV would continue its full-service mix of contemporary music and country music through the 1960s and 1970s. William H. Miller, Jr. served as general manager of the station from 1950 through the late 1970s when C.S. Heartsill, Jr. stepped into the role.

=== New ownership ===
In May 1982, the Greenville Broadcasting Corporation reached an agreement to sell this station to Butler Broadcasters, Inc. The deal was approved by the FCC on July 16, 1982. In April 1984, Millard V. Oakley acquired control of WGYV through purchase of stock in Butler Broadcasters, Inc., from Robert W. Gallaher. The transfer of control was approved by the FCC on April 26, 1984, and the transaction was consummated on July 6, 1984.

In May 1985, Butler Broadcasters, Inc., reached an agreement to sell this station to William Terry Golden's Golden Broadcasting Company. The deal was approved by the FCC on July 14, 1995, and the transaction was consummated on August 1, 1995.

=== WGYV today ===
In October 2002, the Golden Broadcasting Company reached an agreement to sell this station to Robert John Wiliamson. The deal was approved by the FCC on November 29, 2002, and the transaction was consummated on December 16, 2002. Williamson began the process in January 2004 to relocate this station from central Alabama to southeastern Indiana.

In October 2005, the station applied to the FCC for a change of community of license from Greenville, Alabama, to Aurora, Indiana. The move would also bring a change of frequency to 1030 kHz and a reduction in power to 250 watts. (A separate application has been filed to increase that signal power to 500 watts.) The authorization for these major changes was granted on August 6, 2008. Aurora, Indiana is a suburb of Cincinnati, Ohio. The construction permit was allowed to expire on August 6, 2011. As of August 2013, the station is still operating from Alabama.
