= WHHV =

- Hillsville, Virginia; United States
- Broadcast area: Hillsville, Virginia; Carroll County, Virginia
- Frequency: 1400 kHz
- Branding: New Life Christian Radio

Programming
- Format: Southern gospel

Ownership
- Owner: New Life Christian Communications, Inc.
- Sister stations: WGFC

History
- First air date: September 16, 1961
- Call sign meaning: Hillsville, Virginia

Technical information
- Licensing authority: FCC
- Facility ID: 39626
- Class: C
- Power: 1,000 watts (unlimited)
- Transmitter coordinates: 36°45′0.0″N 80°43′20.0″W

Links
- Public license information: Public file; LMS
- Webcast: Listen live
- Website: newlifechurchandministries.net/radio

WHHV is a Southern Gospel-formatted broadcast radio station licensed to Hillsville, Virginia, serving Hillsville and Carroll County, Virginia. WHHV is owned and operated by New Life Christian Communications, Inc.
