= WELR-FM =

- Roanoke, Alabama; United States
- Broadcast area: East Alabama; West Georgia
- Frequency: 102.3 MHz
- Branding: Eagle 102.3-Your Country Leader

Programming
- Format: Country
- Affiliations: ABC Radio

Ownership
- Owner: Eagle's Nest, Inc.
- Sister stations: WLWE, WLAG

History
- First air date: 1969
- Call sign meaning: EagLe Radio

Technical information
- Licensing authority: FCC
- Facility ID: 18135
- Class: C3
- ERP: 8,900 watts
- HAAT: 166.0 meters (545 feet)
- Transmitter coordinates: 33°2′39″N 85°20′15″W

Links
- Public license information: Public file; LMS
- Website: Eagle1023.com

WELR-FM (102.3 FM, "Eagle 102.3") is a radio station broadcasting a country music format. Licensed to Roanoke, Alabama, United States, the station is currently owned by Eagle's Nest, Inc. and features programming from ABC Radio.

== Translators ==
Call sign	Frequency	City of license	FID	Class	FCC info
W245AW	(96.9 FM) FM	La Grange, Georgia	138348	D	LMS
