= WKFE =

Radio station in Yauco, Puerto Rico

- Yauco, Puerto Rico; Puerto Rico
- Frequency: 1550 kHz
- Branding: Radio Café 1550

Programming
- Format: Spanish News Talk Information (daytime); Spanish Religious (nighttime)

Ownership
- Owner: Media Power Group; (Media Power Group, Inc.)
- Operator: Faro de Santidad, Inc. (under time brokerage agreement)
- Sister stations: WSKN, WDEP, WLEY

History
- First air date: November 3, 1961
- Call sign meaning: "Café"

Technical information
- Licensing authority: FCC
- Facility ID: 52942
- Class: B
- Power: 20,050 watts unlimited
- Transmitter coordinates: 18°01′24″N 66°52′02″W
- Translator: 93.5 W228EF (Mayagüez)

Links
- Public license information: Public file; LMS
- Website: www.radioisla.tv www.farodesantidad.com

WKFE (1550 AM, Radio Café 1550) is a radio station licensed to serve Yauco, Puerto Rico. The station is owned by Media Power Group, Inc. and operated through time brokerage agreement by Faro de Santidad, Inc. It airs a Spanish language News Talk Information format during the day and Religious programming during the evening hours. The station shares with translator station W228EF 93.5 FM in Mayagüez.

The station was assigned the WKFE call letters by the Federal Communications Commission.

== Ownership ==
In July 1999, Uno Radio of Ponce Inc., Caguas, P.R. (Jesus M. Soto, chairman) reached an agreement to purchase five radio stations in Puerto Rico from Ponce Broadcasting Corp. (Jenaro G. Scarano Sr., Julio C. Braum, Luis F. Sala, Catalina Scarano and Sala Business Corp., shareholders) for a reported sale price of $10.75 million.

In June 2003, Media Power Group Inc. (Eduardo Rivero Albino, chairman, Gilberto Rivera Gutierrez, Jose E. Fernandez and Joe Pagan, shareholders) reached an agreement to purchase four AM radio stations in Puerto Rico, including WKFE, from Uno Radio Group. (Jesus M. Soto, owner) for a reported $6.8 million.

== Translator stations ==
Broadcast translator for WKFE
Call sign	Frequency	City of license	FID	ERP (W)	FCC info
W228EF	93.5 FM	Mayaguez, Puerto Rico	203036	250	LMS
