= WOKB (AM) =

Winter Garden, Florida; United States
- Broadcast area: Greater Orlando
- Frequency: 1680 kHz
- Branding: WOKB 1680 AM and 100.7 FM

Programming
- Format: Urban gospel; Christian talk and teaching

Ownership
- Owner: Shanti Persaud; (Unity Broadcasting LLC)
- Sister stations: WKIQ; WLAA; WNTF

History
- First air date: April 12, 1999
- Former call signs: WTIR (1999–2003); WLAA (2003–2008)

Technical information
- Licensing authority: FCC
- Facility ID: 87164
- Class: B
- Power: 10,000 watts day; 1,000 watts night
- Transmitter coordinates: 28°34′9″N 81°31′7.3″W
- Translator: 100.7 W264DV (Kissimmee)

Links
- Public license information: Public file; LMS
- Webcast: Listen live
- Website: www.wokbradio.com

WOKB (1680 kHz) is a commercial AM radio station licensed to Winter Garden, Florida, and serving Greater Orlando. The station is owned by Shanti Persaud, through licensee Unity Broadcasting LLC. It broadcasts an urban gospel radio format with some Christian talk and teaching programs.

By day, WOKB's power is 10,000 watts, but to avoid interfering with other stations on 1680 AM, at night it reduces power to 1,000 watts. It uses an nondirectional antenna at all times.

== History ==
WOKB originated as the expanded band "twin" of the original WOKB (1600 AM) on the standard AM band. On March 17, 1997, the Federal Communications Commission (FCC) announced that 88 stations had been given permission to move to newly available "expanded band" transmitting frequencies, ranging from 1610 to 1700 kHz, with WOKB in Winter Garden authorized to move from 1600 to 1680 kHz. A construction permit for the expanded band station was assigned the call sign WTIR on April 12, 1999.

The FCC's initial policy was that both the original station and its expanded band counterpart could operate simultaneously for up to five years, after which owners would have to turn in one of the two licenses, depending on whether they preferred the new assignment or elected to remain on the original frequency. However, this deadline has been extended multiple times, and both stations have remained authorized. One restriction is that the FCC has generally required paired original and expanded band stations to remain under common ownership.

On May 9, 2003, the call sign on 1680 AM was changed to WLAA. On May 6, 2008, the two stations on 1600 and 1680 AM swapped call signs, with WLAA moved to 1600 AM, and WOKB transferred to the expanded band station on 1680 AM.
