= WKIQ =

- Eustis, Florida; United States
- Broadcast area: Greater Orlando
- Frequency: 1240 kHz
- Branding: La Que Buena

Programming
- Format: Regional Mexican

Ownership
- Owner: Shanti Persaud; (Unity Broadcasting LLC)
- Sister stations: WLAA; WNTF; WOKB

History
- First air date: 1955
- Former call signs: WEUS (CP, 1954); WLCO (1954–1982); WEUS (1982–1987); WLCF (1987–1989); WWLB (1989)

Technical information
- Licensing authority: FCC
- Facility ID: 29339
- Class: C
- Power: 790 watts unlimited
- Transmitter coordinates: 28°50′20″N 81°41′45.3″W
- Translator: (107.1 MHz) W296DO (Eustis)

Links
- Public license information: Public file; LMS

WKIQ (1240 AM) is a 790-watt radio station. Licensed to Eustis, Florida, United States, it serves the Orlando area. The station is owned by Shanti Persaud, through licensee Unity Broadcasting LLC, and is running a Regional Mexican format.

== History ==
Between 1995 and 1998, WKIQ aired a mixture of local and syndicated talk programming, before a switch to satellite-fed classic country music took place in March 1998, just prior to the station being sold. News was provided by NBC Radio News at top of every hour during this period, with Florida's FRN News on the half hour.

Due to co-ownership by Gateway Broadcasting and Internet, WKIQ and WQBQ were sister stations between 1998 and 2003. WKIQ was silent for much time between 2003 and 2005, as the previous owner had declared bankruptcy and shuttered WKIQ and WQBQ.

Until December 2010 the station carried Sporting News Radio and had a local program called The Winning Drive which ran Monday to Friday from 4-6 p.m.

According to Federal Communications Commission filings in October 2017, the station tower collapsed during Hurricane Irma in September 2017 and the station resumed broadcasting in October 2017.

As of 2018, WKIQ broadcasts a Regional Mexican format under the name "La Nueva Que Buena", which was previously on WLAA.
