= WHBN =

- Harrodsburg, Kentucky; United States
- Broadcast area: Lexington Metro Area
- Frequency: 1420 kHz
- Branding: The Rooster

Programming
- Format: Country music
- Affiliations: NBC News Radio; Mercer County High School; Burgin Independent Schools

Ownership
- Owner: Hometown Broadcasting of Harrodsburg Inc
- Sister stations: WHIR, WRNZ

History
- First air date: June 25, 1955; 70 years ago
- Call sign meaning: Hometown Broadcasting Network (owners)

Technical information
- Licensing authority: FCC
- Facility ID: 22084
- Class: D
- Power: 1,000 watts day 46 watts night
- Transmitter coordinates: 37°44′3″N 84°48′50″W
- Translator: 99.5 W258DH (Harrodsburg)

Links
- Public license information: Public file; LMS
- Webcast: Listen Live
- Website: Official Website

WHBN (1420 AM) is a country music–formatted radio station licensed to Harrodsburg, Kentucky, United States. The station is owned by Hometown Broadcasting as part of a triopoly with Danville–licensed news/talk station WHIR (1230 AM) and Lancaster–licensed hot adult contemporary station WRNZ (105.1 FM). All three stations share studios on Shakertown Road (KY 33) north of Danville, while its transmitter is located along Bellow Mills Road southeast of Harrodsburg.

Logo before translator sign on

== History ==
WHBN launched in 1955 under the auspices of Pete Hulse and Chuck Shuffett. In 1960, the station was purchased by longtime owner Bob Martin and later his wife Jo Ann. The station initially focused on a variety format, before eventually settling on country music.

== Programming ==
WHBN features the longtime on-air personality "Radio Rick" Schoebel from 6:00 to 10:00 a.m. Monday to Friday and "The WildMan" Jason Wilder on Saturdays and Sundays from 7a:00 a.m. to 12:00 p.m. WHBN also broadcasts live coverage of local high school sports from Mercer County Senior High School and Burgin Independent Schools.
