= WYAC (AM) =

Cabo Rojo, Puerto Rico; Puerto Rico
- Frequency: 930 kHz
- Branding: WYAC 930 AM

Programming
- Format: News/Talk/Variety
- Affiliations: WIAC 740

Ownership
- Owner: Bestov Broadcast Group; (Bestov Broadcasting, Inc.)
- Sister stations: WIAC, WISA

History
- First air date: January 9, 1970
- Former call signs: WEKO (1970–2003)

Technical information
- Licensing authority: FCC
- Facility ID: 15793
- Class: B
- Power: 2,500 watts unlimited
- Transmitter coordinates: 18°06′05″N 67°09′17″W

Links
- Public license information: Public file; LMS
- Website: wiac740.com

WYAC (930 kHz) is an AM radio station licensed to serve Cabo Rojo, Puerto Rico. The station serves as a satellite of WIAC 740 AM in San Juan and it is owned by Bestov Broadcast Group. It airs a News/Talk/Variety format.

The station was assigned the WYAC call letters by the Federal Communications Commission on October 31, 2003. The station begins operations as WEKO, On January 9, 1970, founded by David Ortiz Cintron and was a repeater of NotiUno from 1982 until 1999. WYAC as a satellite of WIAC, produces local programming, including news segments which also listening all across Puerto Rico.
