= WNNV =

- San Germán, Puerto Rico; Puerto Rico
- Broadcast area: Puerto Rico
- Frequency: 91.7 MHz
- Branding: Candelita7

Programming
- Format: Religious

Ownership
- Owner: Juan Esteban Diaz; (Siembra Fertil P.R., Inc.)
- Operator: Ministerio En Pie de Guerra, Inc.
- Sister stations: WEGA, WJDZ

History
- First air date: July 10, 1997; 29 years ago
- Former call signs: WZGX (1994–2000)

Technical information
- Licensing authority: FCC
- Facility ID: 71565
- Class: A
- ERP: 5,000 watts
- HAAT: 828.0 meters (2,716.5 ft)
- Transmitter coordinates: 18°4′7.9″N 67°2′54″W

Links
- Public license information: Public file; LMS
- Website: candelita7.com

WNNV (91.7 FM), branded on-air as Candelita7, is a radio station broadcasting a Spanish Contemporary Christian format. It is licensed to San Germán, Puerto Rico, and serves the southwestern Puerto Rico area. The station is owned by Juan Esteban Diaz, through licensee Siembra Fertil P.R., Incorporated. The station is operated under a Time Brokerage Agreement with Ministerio En Pie de Guerra, Inc.
