= WMEJ =

- Bay St. Louis, Mississippi; United States
- Broadcast area: Gulfport, Mississippi
- Frequency: 1190 kHz
- Branding: Rejoice AM 1190 and FM 104.3

Programming
- Language: English
- Format: Inspirational/Gospel

Ownership
- Owner: Richard L. Mays; (Hancock Broadcasting Company)

History
- First air date: February 5, 1974
- Former call signs: WPUP (1974–1977); WXGR (1977–1988); WBSL (1988–2009); WJZD (2009–2010)

Technical information
- Licensing authority: FCC
- Facility ID: 25961
- Class: D
- Power: 5,000 watts (daytime only)
- Transmitter coordinates: 30°19′26″N 89°21′02″W
- Translator: W282CE (104.3 FM) Bay St. Louis

Links
- Public license information: Public file; LMS
- Website: rejoiceam1190.com

WMEJ is a radio station with a daytime-only AM broadcasting radio station licensed for 5,000 watts on 1190 kHz at Bay St. Louis, Mississippi, serving the Gulfport, Mississippi area. The station broadcasts a gospel format as "Rejoice AM 1190".

== History ==
The station was established as WPUP by the Bay Broadcasting Company on February 5, 1974. The call letters were changed to WXGR in 1977.

The station's studio and transmitter were severely damaged by Hurricane Katrina in 2005. The station returned to the air with low power in the summer of 2006, using a portable building and a donated refurbished transmitter, and resumed full power in December 2006.

The station changed call signs in July 2009 from WBSL "Blues 1190" to WJZD and made its latest change to the current WMEJ in June 2010, when it changed to Spanish-language formatting. The current gospel format was instituted in 2013. The WMEJ call sign was originally assigned to an unrelated station in Monessen, Pennsylvania in 1927.

== FM translator ==
The station is broadcast over FM translator W282CE on 104.3 MHz. The translator, which began broadcasting in 2016, is permitted to broadcast at night, even when the AM station must go off.
