= WKCY (AM) =

- Harrisonburg, Virginia; United States
- Broadcast area: Harrisonburg, Virginia; Rockingham County, Virginia
- Frequency: 1300 kHz
- Branding: NewsRadio WKCY

Programming
- Format: Talk radio
- Affiliations: Fox News Radio; Compass Media Networks; Premiere Networks

Ownership
- Owner: iHeartMedia, Inc.; (iHM Licenses, LLC)
- Sister stations: WACL; WAZR; WKCI; WKCY-FM; WKDW; WSVO

History
- First air date: May 11, 1967

Technical information
- Licensing authority: FCC
- Facility ID: 41815
- Class: D
- Power: 6,400 watts (day); 5 watts (night)
- Transmitter coordinates: 38°27′50.4″N 78°48′24.1″W
- Translator: 107.9 W300CN (Harrisonburg)

Links
- Public license information: Public file; LMS
- Webcast: Listen live (via iHeartRadio)
- Website: newsradiowkcy.iheart.com

WKCY (1300 AM) is a news/talk formatted broadcast radio station licensed to Harrisonburg, Virginia, serving Harrisonburg and Rockingham County, Virginia. WKCY is owned and operated by iHeartMedia, Inc. This station uses a very small mast at 18.4M but the signal is boosted by Capacitive Top loading. Even that help won't help the night signal get far at all.

== History ==
WKCY signed on the air on May 11, 1967. WKCY-AM-FM were acquired by the Mid-Atlantic Network in 1989. Clear Channel Communications, based in San Antonio, Texas, acquired WKCY-AM-FM in 2001.

== Translator ==
In addition to the main station, WKCY is relayed by an FM translator to widen its broadcast area.

Call sign	Frequency	City of license	FID	ERP (W)	HAAT	Class	FCC info
W300CN	107.9 FM	Harrisonburg, Virginia	148178	250	472.1 m (1,549 ft)	D	LMS
