= WAVL (FM) =

- Rothschild, Wisconsin; United States
- Broadcast area: Marshfield, Wisconsin; Stevens Point, Wisconsin; Wausau, Wisconsin
- Frequency: 100.5 MHz
- Branding: Wave 100.5

Programming
- Format: Adult contemporary

Ownership
- Owner: Steven Resnick; (Sunrise Broadcasting LLC)
- Sister stations: WJMT

History
- First air date: 2010 (as WDTX)
- Former call signs: WDTX (2008–2019)

Technical information
- Licensing authority: FCC
- Facility ID: 170968
- Class: C3
- ERP: 25,000 watts
- HAAT: 84 meters (276 ft)
- Transmitter coordinates: 44°50′13.00″N 89°45′57.00″W

Links
- Public license information: Public file; LMS
- Webcast: Listen Live
- Website: wavlfm.com

WAVL (100.5 MHz, "Wave 100.5") is an FM radio station licensed to Rothschild, Wisconsin, United States. The station is currently owned by Steven Resnick, through licensee Sunrise Broadcasting LLC.

On December 26, 2019, WAVL ended its Christmas music stunt and launched an adult contemporary format, branded as "Wave 100.5".

== Previous logo ==
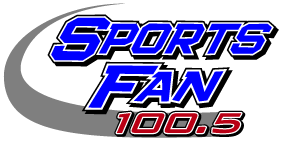
