= WLWE =

- Roanoke, Alabama; United States
- Frequency: 1360 kHz
- Branding: Eagle Sports 1360

Programming
- Format: Sports
- Affiliations: CBS Sports Radio

Ownership
- Owner: Eagle's Nest, Inc.
- Sister stations: WELR-FM, WLAG

History
- First air date: March 10, 1950 (as WELR)
- Former call signs: WELR (1950–2013)

Technical information
- Licensing authority: FCC
- Facility ID: 18134
- Class: D
- Power: 1,000 watts (day); 54 watts (night)
- Transmitter coordinates: 33°11′02″N 85°24′22″W
- Translator: 94.7 W234BQ (Auburn)

Links
- Public license information: Public file; LMS
- Website: WLWE Online

WLWE (1360 AM, "Eagle Sports 1360") is a radio station licensed to serve Roanoke, Alabama owned by Eagle's Nest, Inc. It airs a sports format.

The station began broadcasting on March 10, 1950, and held the call sign WELR. It ran 1,000 watts during daytime hours only. Its call sign was changed to WLWE on September 16, 2013.
