= WKJW =

- Black Mountain, North Carolina; United States
- Broadcast area: Asheville, North Carolina
- Frequency: 1010 kHz
- Branding: The King's Radio Network

Programming
- Format: Gospel music and preaching
- Affiliations: USA Radio News

Ownership
- Owner: International Baptist Outreach Missions, Inc.
- Sister stations: WKJV

History
- First air date: 1962
- Former call signs: WFGW (1962–2013); WLYT (2013)

Technical information
- Licensing authority: FCC
- Facility ID: 5972
- Class: D
- Power: 47,000 watts (day); 90 watts (night)
- Transmitter coordinates: 35°35′29.4″N 82°24′52.4″W
- Translator: 107.3 W297CI (Asheville)

Links
- Public license information: Public file; LMS
- Webcast: Listen live
- Website: wkjv.com

WKJW (1010 AM) is a commercial radio station licensed to Black Mountain, North Carolina, United States. Owned by International Baptist Outreach Missions, Inc. of Asheville, North Carolina, it carries a gospel music format.

The station was founded as WFGW AM in May 1962 by the Billy Graham Evangelistic Association.

A 1970 ad in the Asheville Citizen-Times said WFGW was the only area station playing easy listening music and standards. It was a daytime-only station broadcasting at 50,000 watts.

Prior to 2005, it played mostly Southern gospel music which was moved online. Starting August 1, 2005, as "Faith and Freedom Radio", WFGW was a commercial talk radio station with some Christian talk. WFGW Talk Radio was available on its sister-station's HD signal, 106.9 FM HD3.

WKJW must reduce power to 90 watts at night to protect Canadian clear-channel CFRB in Toronto.

International Baptist Outreach Missions, owner of WKJV of Asheville, North Carolina, purchased 1010 AM and started broadcasting on July 19, 2013, as WKJW.

Former logo

== FM translator ==
An FM translator affords the listener the ability to listen on the FM band with its inherent high fidelity and often stereophonic sound. In addition, FM stations may broadcast 24 hours per day.

Broadcast translator for WKJW
Call sign	Frequency	City of license	FID	ERP (W)	Class	FCC info
W297CI	107.3 FM	Asheville, North Carolina	201713	1	D	LMS
