= Level Plains, Alabama =

City in Alabama, United States

Level Plains
- Town
- Logo

- Location of Level Plains in Dale County, Alabama.
- Coordinates: 31°18′24″N 85°45′42″W
- Country: United States
- State: Alabama
- County: Dale

Area
  - Total: 3.07 sq mi (7.94 km^{2})
  - Land: 3.07 sq mi (7.94 km^{2})
  - Water: 0 sq mi (0.00 km^{2})
- Elevation: 331 ft (101 m)

Population (2020)
  - Total: 1,825
  - Density: 595.0/sq mi (229.72/km^{2})
- Time zone: UTC-6 (Central (CST))
  - Summer (DST): UTC-5 (CDT)
- ZIP code: 36322
- Area code: 334
- FIPS code: 01-42472
- GNIS feature ID: 2406009
- Website: https://cityoflevelplains.wixsite.com/mysite

Level Plains is a small town in Dale County, Alabama, United States. At the 2020 census, the population was 1,825. It is part of the Ozark micropolitan statistical area. Level Plains was ranked as a city from 2010 to 2020, but due to a population decline reverted to a town after the 2020 Census.

== Geography ==
Level Plains is located in southwestern Dale County between Daleville to the east and Enterprise to the west. U.S. Route 84 passes through the middle of the community.

According to the U.S. Census Bureau, the town has a total area of 3.1 square miles (7.9 km^{2}), all land.

== Demographics ==
Historical population
Census	Pop.	Note	%±
1970	1,007		—
1980	867		−13.9%
1990	1,473		69.9%
2000	1,544		4.8%
2010	2,085		35.0%
2020	1,825		−12.5%
U.S. Decennial Census; 2013 Estimate

=== 2020 census ===
As of the 2020 census, Level Plains had a population of 1,825. The median age was 40.9 years. 20.4% of residents were under the age of 18 and 15.7% of residents were 65 years of age or older. For every 100 females there were 96.9 males, and for every 100 females age 18 and over there were 93.9 males age 18 and over.

91.6% of residents lived in urban areas, while 8.4% lived in rural areas.

There were 728 households in Level Plains, and 518 families resided in the town. Of all households, 30.6% had children under the age of 18 living in them, 49.0% were married-couple households, 17.6% were households with a male householder and no spouse or partner present, and 26.0% were households with a female householder and no spouse or partner present. About 23.9% of all households were made up of individuals, and 9.9% had someone living alone who was 65 years of age or older.

There were 788 housing units, of which 7.6% were vacant. The homeowner vacancy rate was 1.5% and the rental vacancy rate was 6.6%.

Level Plains racial composition
Race	Num.	Perc.
White (non-Hispanic)	1,179	64.6%
Black or African American (non-Hispanic)	291	15.95%
Native American	10	0.55%
Asian	43	2.36%
Pacific Islander	1	0.05%
Other/Mixed	111	6.08%
Hispanic or Latino	190	10.41%

=== 2010 census ===
As of the census of 2010, there were 2,085 people with 866 housing units with 801 occupied in the incorporated area. The increase in population by 541 people from the 2000 census changed Level Plains' designation from a town to a small city. The population density was 527.2 inhabitants per square mile (203.6/km^{2}). There were 713 housing units at an average density of 243.5 per square mile (94.0/km^{2}). The racial makeup of the town was 90.86% White, 9.42% Black or African American, 1.00% Native American, 0.56% Asian, 1.36% from other races, and 2.91% from two or more races. 3.04% of the population were Hispanic or Latino of any race.

There were 602 households, out of which 36.7% had children under the age of 18 living with them, 58.5% were married couples living together, 11.0% had a female householder with no husband present, and 26.2% were non-families. 21.9% of all households were made up of individuals, and 6.3% had someone living alone who was 65 years of age or older. The average household size was 2.55 and the average family size was 2.95.

In the town the population was spread out, with 26.5% under the age of 18, 7.3% from 18 to 24, 33.3% from 25 to 44, 23.0% from 45 to 64, and 10.0% who were 65 years of age or older. The median age was 37 years. For every 100 females, there were 104.5 males. For every 100 females age 18 and over, there were 101.2 males.

The median income for a household in the town was $38,269, and the median income for a family was $44,432. Males had a median income of $33,182 versus $20,313 for females. The per capita income for the town was $17,423. About 8.9% of families and 9.2% of the population were below the poverty line, including 8.1% of those under age 18 and 16.7% of those age 65 or over.

== Government ==
The Town Hall is located at 1708 Joe Bruer Road, which is also known as the old Alabama state route 134. The Level Plains town government includes a mayor and five town council members, a town clerk, a court magistrate, a police department, water department and a volunteer fire department. The town is served by both the Daleville and Enterprise U.S. Postal offices, with the town hall using the Daleville 36322 postal address. The primary north–south road is Dale County Road 1, with U.S. Highway 84 bisecting west to east through the middle of the incorporated areas.

Mayor Ronnie Thompson is the current and ninth mayor to serve since the town was incorporated on April 30, 1965. Thompson previously served as councilmember.

== See also ==
- List of cities in Alabama
