= WJOT (AM) =

- Wabash, Indiana; United States
- Frequency: 1510 kHz

Ownership
- Owner: Dream Weaver Marketing, LLC
- Sister stations: WJOT-FM

History
- First air date: November 1971
- Last air date: December 4, 2025
- Former call signs: WAYT (1971–1998)

Technical information
- Licensing authority: FCC
- Facility ID: 13538
- Class: D
- Power: 250 watts (days only)
- Transmitter coordinates: 40°47′11″N 85°49′19″W

Links
- Public license information: Public file; LMS

WJOT (1510 AM) was a radio station licensed to Wabash, Indiana, United States. Last owned by Dream Weaver Marketing, LLC, the station broadcast an oldies format, simulcasting WJOT-FM in Wabash.

== History ==
The station began broadcasting in November 1971 and held the call sign WAYT. The station aired a MOR format. By 1988, the station was airing a country music format. By 1992, the station was airing an adult contemporary/country format. In July 1998, the station's call sign was changed to WJOT and the station adopted an oldies format.

The Federal Communications Commission cancelled the station's license on December 4, 2025. At the time of its closure, the station was simulcasting WJOT-FM.
