= WHFB (AM) =

Radio station in Benton Harbor–St. Joseph, Michigan

Coordinates: 42°04′44″N 86°28′00″W

- Benton Harbor-St. Joseph, Michigan; United States
- Broadcast area: Berrien County, Michigan
- Frequency: 1060 kHz

Programming
- Format: Urban oldies

Ownership
- Owner: Gerard Media, LLC
- Sister stations: WIMS

History
- First air date: September 22, 1947
- Call sign meaning: "Heart of the Fruit Belt"

Technical information
- Licensing authority: FCC
- Facility ID: 72174
- Class: D
- Power: 3,000 watts (day); 2,500 watts (critical hours); 0.13 watts (night)
- Translator: 102.5 W273BM (Benton Harbor)

Links
- Public license information: Public file; LMS
- Webcast: Listen live
- Website: whfbradio.com

WHFB (1060 kHz) is an AM radio station dually licensed to the Twin Cities of Benton Harbor and St. Joseph, Michigan, broadcasting an urban oldies format. AM 1060 is a United States and Mexican clear-channel frequency; KYW and XECPAE-AM are the dominant stations on this frequency. It broadcasts from studios on Fairplain Avenue located in Fair Plain, Michigan, an unincorporated area south of Benton Harbor. The station's transmitter and broadcast tower are also at this location. WHFB is also heard on 102.5 FM, through a translator in Benton Harbor.

== History ==
WHFB's former logo

WHFB began broadcasting September 22, 1947. It ran 1,000 watts, during daytime hours only, and was owned by the Palladium Publishing Company. Its power was increased to 5,000 watts in 1963, while continuing to run 1,000 watts during critical hours. Its power during critical hours was increased to 2,500 watts in 1976.

In 1985, the station was sold to WHFB Broadcast Associates Ltd. Partnership, along with sister station 99.9 WHFB-FM, for $1.5 million. Former sister station WHFB-FM is now separately owned and has since changed call letters to WQLQ and then WYTZ-FM.

WHFB aired an adult contemporary format in the 1980s. By 1989, the station had adopted a country music format, and by 1991, it was airing an adult standards format. In 1996, the station adopted a 1970s based oldies format, with programming from Westwood One. Nighttime service was added in 1997. In 1999, it adopted an all-news format, airing the national audio feed of CNN Headline News.

In 2000, the station adopted a syndicated talk radio format. It was branded "All Talk - AM 1060" and later "Fox News Radio AM 1060". Over the years, hosts heard on the station have included Laura Ingraham, Bill O'Reilly, Bob Dornan, Sean Hannity, Michael Savage, and Monica Crowley. The station went off the air on June 1, 2012, and the station was sold by WHFB Broadcast Associates to WIMS owner Gerard Media, LLC for $175,000.

The station returned to the air on September 2, 2013. The station aired full service format, with a wide variety of music, along with talk shows, Grand Valley State University sports, and other programming. By 2020, it had adopted an urban oldies format, branded "Motown and More".
