= WMAF (Florida) =

- Madison, Florida; United States
- Frequency: 1230 kHz

Programming
- Format: Classic country
- Affiliations: USA Radio Network; Westwood One

Ownership
- Owner: Fred Dockins; (Dockins Communications, Inc.)

History
- First air date: 1956
- Last air date: 2026

Technical information
- Licensing authority: FCC
- Facility ID: 5329
- Class: C
- Power: 1,000 watts unlimited
- Transmitter coordinates: 30°28′23.8″N 83°26′8.5″W
- Translator: (92.5 MHz) W223DG (Madison)

Links
- Public license information: Public file; LMS

WMAF (1230 AM) was a radio station licensed to Madison, Florida, United States. The station was owned by Fred Dockins, through licensee Dockins Communications, Inc., and featured programming from USA Radio Network and Westwood One.

The Federal Communications Commission cancelled the station's license on August 6, 2026.
