= WKJV (AM) =

Currently silent
- Asheville, North Carolina; United States
- Broadcast area: Asheville
- Frequency: 1380 kHz

Ownership
- Owner: International Baptist Outreach Missions
- Sister stations: WKJW

History
- First air date: August 11, 1947
- Former call signs: WLOS (1947–1969); WKKE (1969–1977); WRAQ (1977–1988); WTOO (1988–1992)
- Call sign meaning: "King James Version"

Technical information
- Licensing authority: FCC
- Facility ID: 2921
- Class: B
- Power: 25,000 watts (day); 1,000 watts (night)
- Transmitter coordinates: 35°36′19.4″N 82°35′30.5″W

Links
- Public license information: Public file; LMS

WKJV (1380 AM) is a radio station licensed to Asheville, North Carolina, United States, and serving Buncombe, Madison, McDowell, Mitchell, Haywood, Henderson, Yancey, and Transylvania counties. Currently silent, it most recently was a Christian station as a ministry of International Baptist Outreach Missions, Inc., a not-for-profit organization. The station's programming features Southern gospel music and preaching from the King James Bible.

== History ==
WLOS began broadcasting August 11, 1947, as a Mutual affiliate on 1380 kHz with power of 5 kW (daytime) and 1 kW (night). The station was licensed to Skyway Broadcasting Corporation.

In 1969, WLOS was sold to Greater Asheville Broadcasting Co., owned by the John Jenkins family of Huntington, West Virginia. As the previous owners retained WLOS-FM and WLOS-TV, the callsign was changed to WKKE; the format was MOR/Top 40.

In 1977, WKKE became WRAQ and played adult rock. In 1982, Sid Highes became program director and the format changed to Southern Gospel.

In 1988, GHB Broadcasting purchased the station and changed its letters to WTOO. In 1992, WTOO was not profitable and a format change to rock and roll was planned. Hearing this news, Pastor Doug Roland of Maple Ridge Baptist Church in Candler told some area pastors about the problem, and the decision was made to buy the station by asking listeners to contribute. In five days, $53,000 was raised. Anchor Baptist Broadcasting, which also runs WGCR, took over the station and the call letters WKJV were selected, referring to the King James Version of the Bible.

Former logo

International Baptist Outreach Missions took over in 1997. In September 2001 the signal increased to 25,000 watts. WKJV can now be heard in parts of South Carolina and Tennessee. On July 17, 2013, the former WFGW, after being purchased by I.B.O.M., became WKJW.

WKJV is silent as of April 18, 2025.
