= WLEY (AM) =

- Cayey, Puerto Rico; Puerto Rico
- Broadcast area: Puerto Rico
- Frequency: 1080 kHz
- Branding: Radio Ley 1080

Programming
- Format: News/talk
- Affiliations: CNN Radio

Ownership
- Owner: Media Power Group; (Media Power Group, Inc.)
- Sister stations: WSKN; WDEP; WKFE

History
- First air date: September 8, 1964
- Call sign meaning: Radio Ley

Technical information
- Licensing authority: FCC
- Facility ID: 52945
- Class: B
- Power: 50,000 watts unlimited
- Transmitter coordinates: 18°56′55″N 66°58′28″W

Links
- Public license information: Public file; LMS
- Website: www.radioisla.tv/radio-ley-1080

WLEY (1080 kHz, "Radio Ley") is an AM radio station licensed to serve Cayey, Puerto Rico. The station was founded on September 8, 1964, and it is owned by Media Power Group, Inc. WLEY is part of the Radio Isla Network. It airs a Spanish language news/talk format.

The station was assigned the WLEY call letters by the Federal Communications Commission.

== Ownership ==
In July 1999, Uno Radio of Ponce Inc., Caguas, P.R. (Jesus M. Soto, chairman) reached an agreement to purchase five radio stations in Puerto Rico from Ponce Broadcasting Corp. (Janero G. Scarano Sr., Julio C. Braum, Luis F. Sala, Catalina Scarano and Sala Business Corp., shareholders) for a reported sale price of $10.75 million.

In June 2003, Media Power Group Inc. (Eduardo Rivero Albino, chairman, Gilberto Rivera Gutierrez, Jose E. Fernandez and Joe Pagan, shareholders) reached an agreement to purchase four AM radio stations in Puerto Rico, including WLEY, from Uno Radio Group. (Jesus M. Soto, owner) for a reported $6.8 million.
