= WKCI (AM) =

Radio station in Waynesboro, Virginia

- Waynesboro, Virginia; United States
- Broadcast area: Staunton, Virginia; Eastern Augusta County, Virginia
- Frequency: 970 kHz
- Branding: NewsRadio WKCY

Programming
- Format: Talk radio
- Affiliations: Fox News Radio; Compass Media Networks; Premiere Networks

Ownership
- Owner: iHeartMedia, Inc.; (iHM Licenses, LLC)
- Sister stations: WACL; WAZR; WKCY; WKCY-FM; WKDW; WSVO

History
- First air date: March 10, 1965
- Former call signs: WRWV (1961–1962); WBVA (1962–1964); WANV (1964–1994); WVAO (1994–1996); WINF (1996–2001)
- Call sign meaning: similar to WKCY

Technical information
- Licensing authority: FCC
- Facility ID: 70862
- Class: B
- Power: 5,000 watts (day); 1,000 watts (night)
- Transmitter coordinates: 38°5′12.5″N 78°54′41.1″W

Links
- Public license information: Public file; LMS
- Webcast: Listen live (via iHeartRadio)
- Website: newsradiowkcy.iheart.com

WKCI is a news/talk formatted broadcast radio station licensed to Waynesboro, Virginia, serving Staunton and Eastern Augusta County, Virginia. WKCI is owned and operated by iHeartMedia, Inc. WKCI simulcasts WKCY from Harrisonburg.
