= WJNX-FM =

Radio station in Okeechobee, Florida

- Okeechobee, Florida; United States
- Broadcast area: Okeechobee County /; Treasure Coast
- Frequency: 106.1 MHz
- Branding: La Ley 95.1 FM & 106.1 FM

Programming
- Language: Spanish
- Format: Regional Mexican

Ownership
- Owner: BMZ Broadcasting, LLC
- Operator: Glades Media Group
- Sister stations: WJNX

History
- First air date: July 13, 2010
- Former call signs: WMQJ (2010); WAFC-FM (2010–2019); WLMX (2019–2023)

Technical information
- Licensing authority: FCC
- Facility ID: 183336
- Class: C3
- ERP: 12,500 watts
- HAAT: 85 meters (279 ft)
- Transmitter coordinates: 27°13′18″N 80°52′5″W

Links
- Public license information: Public file; LMS
- Webcast: Listen live
- Website: www.wjnxfm.com

WJNX-FM (106.1 MHz) is a radio station licensed to Okeechobee, Florida, WJNX-FM is owned by BMZ Broadcasting and operated by Glades Media Group. WJNX-FM is a Regional Mexican programmed radio station serving the Treasure Coast and Okeechobee County.
