= WIRA =

- Fort Pierce, Florida; United States
- Broadcast area: Vero Beach, Florida
- Frequency: 1400 kHz

Programming
- Format: Latin-American music

Ownership
- Owner: Carline Clerge; (Caribbean Media Group, Inc.)

History
- First air date: 1946
- Last air date: April 2025
- Former call signs: WIRA (1946–1996); WYFX (1996–1997)
- Call sign meaning: Indian River Area

Technical information
- Licensing authority: FCC
- Facility ID: 2681
- Class: C
- Power: 1,000 watts unlimited
- Transmitter coordinates: 27°26′8.14″N 80°21′40.18″W
- Translator: 104.9 W285FN (Port St. Lucie)

Links
- Public license information: Public file; LMS

WIRA (1400 AM) was a radio station broadcasting Latin-American music. Licensed to Fort Pierce, Florida, United States, the station served the Vero Beach area, but also reached Sebastian, Florida. The station was owned by Carline Clerge, through licensee Caribbean Media Group, Inc. In addition, this radio station was also popularly known as "La Nueva" and was re-transmitted on FM translator W285FN (104.9) in Port St. Lucie.

== History ==
WIRA was first licensed on September 18, 1946. The station changed its call sign to WYFX on November 1, 1996. On August 15, 1997, the WIRA call sign returned.

Following divorce proceedings involving Caribbean Media Group's principals, the company filed to transfer WIRA and WPOM to Sugar Broadcasting, owner of WSWN, in November 2023. On February 13, 2024, WIRA went silent after it was found to be interfering with another nearby AM station. The station again went silent in April 2025 for financial reasons. Caribbean Media Group did respond to an operational inquiry, leading the Federal Communications Commission to cancel the station's license on October 22, 2026.

== Translator ==
Call sign	Frequency	City of license	FID	ERP (W)	Class	Transmitter coordinates	FCC info
W285FN	104.9 FM	Port St. Lucie, Florida	156985	250	D	27°16′31.2″N 80°17′10.2″W	LMS
