= WLAA =

- Winter Garden, Florida; United States
- Broadcast area: Greater Orlando
- Frequency: 1600 kHz
- Branding: Radio Tempo International

Programming
- Language: Haitian Creole
- Format: Haitian music, news, and culture

Ownership
- Owner: Shanti Persaud; (Unity Broadcasting LLC)
- Sister stations: WKIQ; WNTF; WOKB

History
- First air date: January 1, 1958
- Former call signs: WGOA (1957–1959); WOKB (1959–1988); WXXO (1988–1990); WXTO (1990–1994); WOKB (1994–2008); WNTF (2017–2018)

Technical information
- Licensing authority: FCC
- Facility ID: 55006
- Class: D
- Power: 2,200 watts (day); 35 watts (night)
- Transmitter coordinates: 28°34′6″N 81°31′7.3″W

Links
- Public license information: Public file; LMS
- Webcast: Listen live
- Website: imediatempo.com

WLAA (1600 AM) is a commercial radio station broadcasting Haitian music, news, and culture. Licensed to Winter Garden, Florida, it serves the Greater Orlando area. The station is owned by Shanti Persaud, through licensee Unity Broadcasting LLC.

WLAA is a Class D station. By day, it transmits with 2,200 watts, and at night, to avoid interference to other stations on 1600 AM, it reduces power to 35 watts.

== History ==
=== Early years ===
The station was first authorized, as WGOA, on April 24, 1957, and debuted on January 1, 1958. The station was a daytimer, licensed to E. V. Price, powered at 1,000 watts and required to go off the air at night.

The call letters were changed to WOKB on May 25, 1959. It had an R&B format aimed at Orlando's African-American community. On April 4, 1988, it became WXXO. Then it switched to WXTO on January 22, 1990, and back to WOKB on January 31, 1994.

=== Expanded Band authorization ===
On March 17, 1997, the Federal Communications Commission (FCC) announced that 88 stations had been given permission to move to the newly available "Expanded Band" transmitting frequencies, ranging from 1610 to 1700 kHz. WOKB was authorized to move from 1600 to 1680 kHz. A construction permit for the expanded band station was assigned the call letters WTIR (now WOKB) on April 12, 1999.

The FCC's initial policy was that both the original station and its expanded band counterpart could operate simultaneously for up to five years, after which owners would have to turn in one of the two licenses, depending on whether they preferred. That could be the new assignment or the station could remain on the original frequency. However, this deadline has been extended multiple times, and both stations have remained authorized. One restriction is that the FCC has generally required paired original and expanded band stations to remain under common ownership.

=== Call sign exchange ===
On May 6, 2008, the two stations on 1600 and 1680 AM swapped call letters, with WOKB transferred to the expanded band station at 1680 AM, and WLAA moved to 1600 AM. The 1600 facility's call letters later changed to WNTF on November 13, 2017, and back to WLAA on June 1, 2018.

As of 2018, the Regional Mexican "La Nueva Que Buena" format moved to WKIQ. WLAA then took on a Haitian Creole-language format.
