= 1550 AM =

AM radio frequency

The following radio stations broadcast on AM frequency 1550 kHz: 1550 AM is a clear-channel frequency reserved for Canada. Class A CBEF in Windsor, Ontario, broadcasts on 1550 kHz. Clear-channel status had also been shared with XHRUV in Jalapa, Veracruz, Mexico, but that station switched to FM only, with the AM station now silent. See also List of broadcast station classes.

== Argentina ==
- LT 23 in San Genaro, Santa Fe
- LT 40 in La Paz, Entre Rios
- LT 32 in Chivilcoy, Buenos Aires
- Estación 1550 in Buenos Aires
- La Amistad in José C. Paz
- Popular in José León Suárez

== Canada ==
Stations in bold are clear-channel stations.

Call sign	City of license	Daytime power (kW)	Nighttime power (kW)	Transmitter coordinates
**CBEF**	Windsor, Ontario	10	10	42.2156°N 82.9208°W

== Mexico ==
- XEBG-AM in Tijuana, Baja California
- XENU-AM in Nuevo Laredo, Tamaulipas
- XEREL-AM in Morelia, Michoacán

== United States ==
Call sign	City of license	Facility ID	Class	Daytime power (kW)	Nighttime power (kW)	Unlimited power (kW)	Transmitter coordinates
KAPE	Cape Girardeau, Missouri	70594	D	5	0.048		37.279444°N 89.559722°W
KCOM	Comanche, Texas	2866	D	0.25	0.054		31.899722°N 98.586667°W
KESJ	St. Joseph, Missouri	8767	B	2.5	0.5		39.8275°N 94.810833°W
KICS	Hastings, Nebraska	26651	D	0.5	0.027		40.5675°N 98.375278°W
KIWA	Sheldon, Iowa	60088	D	0.283	0.006		43.181389°N 95.865556°W
KKCL	Golden, Colorado	161314	B	0.99	0.35		39.891944°N 105.238889°W
KKLE	Winfield, Kansas	31892	D	0.25	0.052		37.236389°N 97.025278°W
KKOV	Vancouver, Washington	69812	B	50	12		45.646389°N 122.514167°W
KMAD	Madill, Oklahoma	54811	D	0.25	0.09		34.106667°N 96.775°W
KMRI	West Valley City, Utah	25405	B	10	0.34		40.721111°N 112.041389°W
KQNM	Albuquerque, New Mexico	4705	D	10	0.027		35.170556°N 106.630833°W
KRPI	Ferndale, Washington	21416	B	50	10		48.843056°N 122.601389°W
KRZD	Springfield, Missouri	17137	D	5	0.028		37.194722°N 93.317778°W
KUAZ	Tucson, Arizona	2723	D	50			32.3725°N 111.097778°W
KWBC	College Station, Texas	40912	D	1.5	0.045		30.631667°N 96.357778°W
KWRN	Apple Valley, California	33393	B	5	0.5		34.536667°N 117.156111°W
KXEX	Fresno, California	54960	B	5	2.5		36.770556°N 119.922222°W
KXTO	Reno, Nevada	21530	D	2.5	0.094		39.5775°N 119.847778°W
KYAL	Sapulpa, Oklahoma	35974	D	2.5	0.04		36.018889°N 96.098611°W
KZDG	San Francisco, California	25458	B	10	10		37.533056°N 122.274167°W
WAMA	Tampa, Florida	19055	D	10	0.133		27.918056°N 82.394722°W
WAUR	Somonauk, Illinois	17039	D	0.38	0.006		41.341389°N 88.425278°W
WAZX	Smyrna, Georgia	22983	D	50	0.016		33.857778°N 84.644167°W
WBFJ	Winston-Salem, North Carolina	73708	D	1			36.109167°N 80.245556°W
WCGR	Canandaigua, New York	8504	D	0.25			42.881111°N 77.250556°W
WCVL	Crawfordsville, Indiana	8093	D	0.25	0.005		40.065556°N 86.933611°W
WEVR	River Falls, Wisconsin	25992	D	0.92	0.004		44.888611°N 92.650556°W
WHIT	Madison, Wisconsin	19622	D	5			43.002222°N 89.386944°W
WIGN	Bristol, Tennessee	63979	D	35	0.006		36.565833°N 82.1575°W
WIRV	Irvine, Kentucky	34248	D	1	0.005		37.715833°N 83.974722°W
WITK	Pittston, Pennsylvania	70868	B	10	0.5		41.346111°N 75.785°W (daytime); 41.345833°N 75.785°W (nighttime)
WJIL	Jacksonville, Illinois	43772	D	1	0.01		39.722222°N 90.195278°W
WKBA	Vinton, Virginia	67180	D	1			37.29°N 79.922778°W
WKFE	Yauco, Puerto Rico	52942	B			0.25	18.023333°N 66.867222°W
WKTF	Vienna, Georgia	17306	D	10	0.023		32.128889°N 83.796111°W
WLOR	Huntsville, Alabama	39508	D	50	0.044		34.8525°N 86.652778°W
WMRE	Charles Town, West Virginia	27003	D	5	0.006		39.273056°N 77.865556°W
WNDI	Sullivan, Indiana	2394	D	0.25			39.075556°N 87.399167°W
WNTN	Cambridge, Massachusetts	48781	D	6.7	0.003		42.386944°N 71.139167°W
WNZF	Bunnell, Florida	134066	D	5.5	0.057		29.469167°N 81.266667°W
WOCC	Corydon, Indiana	54550	D	0.25	0.006		38.190556°N 86.133333°W
WPFC	Baton Rouge, Louisiana	31172	D	5	0.042		30.501944°N 91.210833°W
WQCD	Delaware, Ohio	54557	D	0.5	0.029		40.298889°N 83.046111°W
WRHC	Coral Gables, Florida	73945	B	10	0.5		25.650556°N 80.16°W (daytime); 25.743333°N 80.314444°W (nighttime)
WSDK	Bloomfield, Connecticut	37804	B	5	2.4		41.863056°N 72.733611°W
WSRY	Elkton, Maryland	21621	D	1	0.001		39.595833°N 75.797222°W
WTHB	Augusta, Georgia	15843	D	5	0.011		33.5°N 81.934167°W
WTXW	Towanda, Pennsylvania	68613	D	0.5	0.004		41.765278°N 76.486111°W
WUCO	Morganfield, Kentucky	68808	D	0.145	0.006		37.667778°N 87.929444°W
WUSP	Utica, New York	4680	D	1	0.003		43.113333°N 75.256944°W
WZUM	Braddock, Pennsylvania	68903	D	1	0.004		40.413056°N 79.853889°W
