= 1140 AM =

AM radio frequency

The following radio stations broadcast on AM frequency 1140 kHz: 1140 AM is a Mexican and United States clear-channel frequency. XEMR Monterrey, Nuevo León, and WRVA Richmond, Virginia, share Class A status of 1140 AM.

== In Argentina ==
- La Luna in El Palomar, Buenos Aires
- LU22 in Tandil, Buenos Aires

== In Canada ==
Call sign	City of license	Daytime power (kW)	Nighttime power (kW)	Transmitter coordinates
CBI	Sydney, Nova Scotia	10	10	46.135833°N 60.269444°W
CBJ-2	Chapais, Quebec	0.04	0.04	49.7844°N 74.8619°W
CHRB	High River, Alberta	50	46	50.9236°N 113.834°W

== In Mexico ==
Stations in bold are clear-channel stations.

- **XEMR-AM** in Apodaca, Nuevo León - 50 kW, transmitter located at 25.764444°N 100.253056°W
- XEPEC-AM in San Bartolo Tutotepec, Hidalgo
- XETEC-AM in Tecpatan, Chiapas

== In the United States ==
Stations in bold are clear-channel stations.

Call sign	City of license	Facility ID	Class	Daytime power (kW)	Nighttime power (kW)	Critical hours power (kW)	Unlimited power (kW)	Transmitter coordinates
KCXL	Liberty, Missouri	1162	D	4	0.006			39.238333°N 94.399722°W
KGEM	Boise, Idaho	6328	B	10	10			43.596389°N 116.25°W
KHFX	Cleburne, Texas	65313	B	5	0.71			32.2825°N 97.413056°W
KHTK	Sacramento, California	20352	B	50	50			38.392778°N 121.1975°W
KLTK	Centerton, Arkansas	33073	D	5				36.363889°N 94.348056°W
KNAB	Burlington, Colorado	35206	D	1	0.01			39.294722°N 102.260278°W
KNWQ	Palm Springs, California	72030	B	10	2.5			33.860833°N 116.472222°W
KPWB	Piedmont, Missouri	28120	D	1				37.141389°N 90.703056°W
KRMP	Oklahoma City, Oklahoma	63794	D	1				35.387222°N 97.498889°W
KSLD	Soldotna, Alaska	34880	B				10	60.523889°N 151.056389°W
KVLI	Lake Isabella, California	35857	D	1				35.632222°N 118.475278°W
KXRB	Sioux Falls, South Dakota	46710	B	10	5			43.480556°N 96.685278°W
KYOK	Conroe, Texas	40484	D	5				30.344444°N 95.458889°W
KZMQ	Greybull, Wyoming	5245	D	10				44.450278°N 108.048889°W
WAPF	McComb, Mississippi	58934	D	1				31.2475°N 90.420556°W
WAWK	Kendallville, Indiana	49395	D	0.25				41.454444°N 85.263333°W
WBXR	Hazel Green, Alabama	8999	D	15		7.5		34.953056°N 86.645°W
WCJW	Warsaw, New York	37858	D	8		2.3		42.726111°N 78.111944°W
WHNQ	St. Paul, Virginia	74348	D	0.25				36.870833°N 82.305833°W
WLOD	Loudon, Tennessee	38473	D	1				35.726389°N 84.346944°W
WPNS	Destin, Florida	72803	D	3	0.012	2.4		30.509444°N 86.476111°W
WQBA	Miami, Florida	73912	B	50	10			25.7675°N 80.486111°W
WQII	San Juan, Puerto Rico	12712	B				10	18.358333°N 66.134722°W
WRNA	China Grove, North Carolina	61153	D	1		0.25		35.572222°N 80.589167°W
**WRVA**	Richmond, Virginia	11914	A				50	37.403611°N 77.316389°W
WVEL	Pekin, Illinois	68623	D	5		3.2		40.603333°N 89.625556°W
WVHF	Kentwood, Michigan	14667	D	5				42.935833°N 85.457222°W
WVVO	Orlando, Florida	21759	D	5	0.008			28.58°N 81.421111°W
