= WTTC =

WTTC may refer to:

- World Travel and Tourism Council
- WTTC-FM, a radio station (95.3 FM) licensed to serve Towanda, Pennsylvania, United States
- WTXW, a radio station (1550 AM) licensed to serve Towanda, Pennsylvania, which held the call sign WTTC from 1960 to 2022
- Women's Tag Team Championship
- World Tag Team Championship (WWE), a professional wrestling championship
- World Table Tennis Championships
