= WTIS =

- Tampa, Florida; United States
- Broadcast area: Tampa Bay
- Frequency: 1110 kHz
- Branding: La Mega Tampa Bay

Programming
- Language: Spanish
- Format: Contemporary hit radio

Ownership
- Owner: George & Esperanza Arroyo; (Q-Broadcasting Corporation, Inc.)
- Sister stations: WAMA; WLBE

History
- First air date: December 11, 1946
- Former call signs: WALT (1946–1970); WQYK (1970–1976)
- Call sign meaning: "Tampa Inspirational" (based on previous format)

Technical information
- Licensing authority: FCC
- Facility ID: 74088
- Class: D
- Power: 10,000 watts (day); 5,500 watts (critical hours)
- Transmitter coordinates: 27°55′7.1″N 82°23′41.3″W
- Translators: 101.1 W266CW (Tampa); 96.1 W241DH (Riverview)

Links
- Public license information: Public file; LMS
- Webcast: Listen live
- Website: www.lamegatampa.com

WTIS (1110 AM) is a radio station licensed to Tampa, Florida, it serves the Tampa Bay area. The station is owned by Esperanza Arroyo, through licensee Q-Broadcasting Corporation, Inc. WTIS also broadcasts on FM translators, W266CW (101.1 FM) in Tampa, and W241DH 96.1 FM in Riverview. Its transmitter and tower are co-located with its sister station, WAMA.

WTIS is a daytimer station, to protect clear-channel stations WBT in Charlotte, North Carolina, and KFAB in Omaha, Nebraska, it must sign off the air at sundown.

== History ==
W. Walter Tison applied on January 31, 1946, to build a new radio station in Tampa, Florida. The application was amended in April to specify the daytime-only frequency of 1110 kHz, and the Federal Communications Commission (FCC) approved on July 18, provided Tison divested his interest in Tampa station WFLA. WALT went on the air on December 11, 1946. Tison would go on to found television station WTVT.

WALT was a pioneer Top 40 station in the Tampa area. In the 1960s, a weekly Sunday afternoon broadcast from Tampa Municipal Beach entitled Beach Party featured The Littlest DJ, Ricky Barone, later known as Richard Barone of The Bongos.

In 1970, Suncoast Radio, the owners of future WQYK-FM 99.5, bought WALT and relaunched it as a country music station, WQYK. The signal was simulcast with WQYK-FM until 1976, when the AM station was sold to a religious broadcaster and its call letters changed to WTIS.

In addition to its regular religious programming, WTIS aired The Debra Evans in the Morning Show, The Herman Cain Show, The Pete O'Shea Show and The Adam Smith Show.

On January 1, 2017, WTIS notified the FCC that it had suspended operations on December 31, 2016, because it had lost its lease to the transmitter site, located near the intersection of 50th Street and Causeway Boulevard in the Palm River-Clair Mel area of Hillsborough County. It requested authorization to remain off the air for six months while it searched for a new site. The authorization was granted on January 18, 2017. The station has since been sold to Q Broadcasting Corporation, the owners of WAMA 1550 kHz. The station would return to the air with an oldies pop music format as "Timeless 1110 and 101.1", but would very soon flip to a Spanish-language Salsa and Merengue format, with an announcement that they would change to a more general Spanish-language format on April 30, 2018.

On April 30, 2018, WTIS flipped to Spanish variety (salsa, merengue, bachata, Spanish pop and rock).

George Arroyo died on October 25, 2022, leaving ownership of WTIS/W266CW to Ezperanza Arroyo.
