= Beat Hotel (The Bongos album) =

Studio album by the Bongos
- Released: 1985
- Genre: Pop rock, power pop
- Label: RCA Victor
- Producer: John Jansen

The Bongos chronology
Numbers with Wings (1983)	Beat Hotel (1985)	Drums Along the Hudson – Special Edition (2007)

Beat Hotel is an album by the American band the Bongos, released in 1985. Its title is an homage to the Beat Hotel, in Paris, where many Beat writers lived in the 1950s. The first single was "Space Jungle". The album peaked at No. 209 on the Billboard 200. The band supported Beat Hotel with a North American tour.

== Production ==
Produced by John Jansen, the recording sessions for the album took four months, with the Bongos using four different studios. The band's frontman Richard Barone and guitarist James Mastro spent much of 1984 in Mexico, which influenced their decision to use Latin percussion on some of the tracks. The Bongos were also inspired by the Beatles' Revolver and tried to write and record the songs in different ways. Barone used the cut-up technique for some of the songs' lyrics. He played a guitar synthesizer on several tracks; he borrowed the instrument from Kool & the Gang, who were recording in the same studio. Kate Pierson sang on "Apache Dancing".

== Critical reception ==
Professional ratings
Review scores
Source	Rating
AllMusic	3/5 stars
Calgary Herald	F
Duluth News Tribune	3/10
The Great Indie Discography	4/10
MusicHound Rock: The Essential Album Guide	4/5 stars

The Philadelphia Daily News said, "In going for a more complete pop-rock sound, the Bongos have sacrificed a bit of their off-the-wall charm, so that some cuts here... sound like they were tailored to fit in on 'contemporary hits' format radio stations." The San Diego Union stated that "the bouncy guitar playing of James Mastro and Richard Barone and the ecstatic, always melodic vocals ... recalled innumerable now-forgotten power pop groups from the late '70s." The Courier-News called the album "important party music." The Boston Globe said that "there's nothing worth the pop pantheon."

The Tampa Tribune praised Barone's "perfect-pop tenor". The New York Daily News noted that the band "can be a little camp and corny, recalling the Dave Clark Five." The Calgary Herald opined that "everything is so painfully shallow this time around", concluding that "there isn't one hook, one lyrical gem that stays with the listener after a song has limped by." Trouser Press labeled Beat Hotel "the Bongos' most rocking record, a sparkling explosion of guitar pop." The Duluth News Tribune stated, "The Bongos are an object lesson in what can happen when an artificial movement like 'power pop' or 'new wave' dies out."

== Track listing ==
No.	Title	Length
1.	"Space Jungle"
2.	"Apache Dancing"
3.	"Brave New World"
4.	"A Story (Written in the Sky)"
5.	"The Beat Hotel"
6.	"Come Back to Me"
7.	"Splinters"
8.	"She Starts Shaking"
9.	"Totem Pole"
10.	"Blow Up"

== Personnel ==
- Richard Barone — lead guitar, lead vocals, guitar synthesizer
- James Mastro — electric and acoustic guitars, backing and lead vocals
- Bob Norris — bass, backing vocals
- Frank Giannini — drums, backing and lead vocals
