= John Matarazzo discography =

- Executive Producer: 37
- Producer: 73
- Design/Realization: 30
- DJ Mix: 6
- Technical: 4
- Composer: 2

This page is the discography for musician John Matarazzo. He has worked in music publishing and as a producer and composer.

== Executive producer ==
Year	Title	Artist
2006	Abele Dance	Manu Dibango
2002	To Understand: The Early Recordings of Matthew Sweet	Matthew Sweet
1999	Black Ark	Lee “Scratch” Perry & The Upsetters
1999	Massive	Sly and Robbie
1999	Rasta Business	Gregory Isaacs
1998	Quick	Buju Banton
1998	Secret Life	Material
1997	It’ll Come to You	Marty Joe Kupersmith
1997	Mama	Brenda Fassie
1996	Francis Bacon in Conversation with Melvyn Bragg	Francis Bacon
1996	Not Alone	Thomas Jefferson Kaye
1996	The Best Of Vols. 1 & 2	Fela Kuti
1994	Le Grande Maitre Franco	Pepe Ndombe
1993	Celluloid Our World of Music, Vol. 2	Various Artists
1992	Cantigas Numa Lingua Antiga	Amália Rodrigues
1992	Makhombo	Steve Kekana
1992	Pick Six	Condry Ziqubu
1992	Raizes Do Pelo	Raizes Do Pelo
1992	Retro Fit	The Last Poets
1991	Celluloid: Our World of Music	Various Artists
1991	Daniela	Daniela Mercury
1991	Pon Moun Paka Bouge Pepe	Pépé Kallé
1991	West/East	Youth Gone Mad
1988	Japan Concerts	Mooko
1988	The 1979 Disconet Top Tune Medley	
1987	From the Board: Cassette Records ’87	Last Exit
1987	Firebyrd	Gene Clark
1985	Down by Law	Deadline
1985	Electric Africa	Manu Dibango
1985	New Africa, Vol 1 & Vol 3	Toure Kunda & Others
1984	Makassi	Sam Fan Thomas
1984	Roots of Rap: The 12 Inch Singles, Vol 1	Various Artists
1982	Yankees	Derek Bailey
1981	The 1980 Disconet Top Tune Medley	Various Artists
1977	Delights of the Garden	The Last Poets

== Producer ==
Year	Title	Artist
2008	Journey Into The China	
2006	A Night of Blues	B.B. King
2006	Dead or Alive	Black Sabbath
2006	Destruction of Syntax	Valis 1
2006	Ambient Dub Volume I	Divination
2006	Live in Concert	Prince
2006	Philadelphia Soul	Harold Melvin
2006	South Philly	Daryl Hall & John Oates
2006	Throughout the Years	Roy Orbison
2005	Live: Detroit/Chicago	Herbie Hancock
2005	Soul Genius – Live	Ray Charles
2005	Vampire Music, Vol. 1 & 2	Gypsies Maladron
2004	All in the Name of Love	Barry White
2004	Booth Blasters: Rip Up the Mic!	Various Artists
2004	Love for Sale	George Benson
2004	You’re the Star	Rod Stewart
2003	Fiesta	Tito Puente
2003	Revolution	The Mighty Diamonds
2002	Want It	Buju Banton
2000	Data Bass	
2000	Habanera	Celia Cruz
2000	Mambo Mambo	Tito Puente
2000	Gonna Bring Ya	Buju Banton
1999	Chronic	Yellowman
1999	Dancehall Rhythm	Various Artists
1999	Degung-sabilulungan: Sudanese Music of West Java, Vol. 2	
1999	Djema el Fna	Mustapha Baqbou
1999	King of Rai	Khlad
1999	Obeah Peace & Love	Culture
1999	Passion	Nusrat Fateh Ali Khan
1999	Soundtracks: For Your Life	Bally Sagoo
1999	Visions of Allah	Nusrat Fateh Ali Khan
1999	Young Africa	Pépé Kallé
1999	Together	Cheb Khaled
1998	Babylon I Rebel	Sly and Robbie
1998	Music Is the Weapon of the Future	Fela Kuti
1998	Music Is the Weapon of the Future, Vol. 2	Fela Kuti
1998	Red Road Crossing	Native American Chant
1998	Gregorian Chant	The Monks of Notre Dame
1997	Chinese Han Music: Zheng Melodies Above the Clouds	Luo LIan
1997	Himalayan Roots: Traditional Music of Nepal	Bharat Nepali Party
1997	Mata	Lata Mangeshkar
1997	Music From the Castle Dracula	
1997	Music From the Land of Vampires	
1997	Sartori: Tibetan Mantras & Chants	Buddhist Monks of Maitri Vihar Monastery
1997	Smoking Cloves: Bamboo Gamelan of Sangburni	Gamelan Sangburni
1997	Sundanese Wedding Ceremony	Gentra Pasundan Degung Group
1997	1984	Praxis
1996	Mega Star	Nusrat Fateh Ali Khan
1996	Quari-Sage Miran, Vol. 2	M. Saeed Chisti
1996	Himalaya Roots, Traditional Music of Nepal	Bharat Nepali Party
1995	Balinese Gamelan Gong	
1995	Balinese Music, Vol. 2: Barong & Keris Dance – The Fight of Good and Evil	Tegaltamu of Batubulan
1995	Degung: Sabilulungan: Sudanese Music of West Java	Suara Parahiangan
1995	Music from the Island of Gods: Balinese Gamelan Gong	Sekaa Gong Bina Remaja Ubud
1995	Samba Bahiana	Raizes Do Pelo
1995	Tapanuli, Vol. 1: Music of Northern Sumatra	Partopi Tao Group
1995	Tibetan Prayer	Buddhist Nuns at Chuchikjall Tibetan Pujas
1995	Sumnific Flux	MJ Harris and Bill Laswell
1995	Web	Bill Laswell and Terre Thaemlitz
1994	Metatron	Praxis
1994	Ambient Dub Volume 1	Divination
1994	Smoking Cloves	Gamelan Sangburni
1993	Low Life	Peter Brötzmann and Bill Laswell
1993	Cassette Recordings ’87	Last Exit
1992	Lightnin’ Rod	Jimi Hendrix
1992	Abele Dance	Manu Dibango
1992	Not Alone	Thomas Jefferson Kaye
1992	Roots of Rap – the 12 Inch Singles Volume 1	
1984	Army Arrangement	Fela Kuti
1982	One Down	Material
1971	En Espana	Celia Cruz

== Design/Realization ==
Year	Title	Artist
2009	Live in Japan	Michael Jackson
2008	All the Classic Video Hits (DVD)	The Supremes
2008	All the Hits	Luther Vandross
2008	Disco Queen	Donna Summer
2008	Live from the Heartland	Lynyrd Skynyrd
2008	Live in Tokyo	Al Green
2007	A Night of Rapture (DVD)	Anita Baker
2007	American Soul, Vol. 1 & 2	Various Artists
2007	Daddy Yankee Live	Daddy Yankee
2007	El Cantante (DVD)	Héctor Lavoe
2007	Funk It Up and Dance	Various Artists
2007	Live (DVD)	Whitney Houston
2007	Live at the Greek Theatre: Together	Gladys Knight
2007	Live from Cali Colombia	Marc Anthony
2007	Live in London	The Temptations
2007	Soul Patrol: Soul’s Greatest Hits	Various Artists
2007	Super Soul Session	Various Artists
2006	Live in Concert	Nusrat Fateh Ali Khan
2006	Live in Europe 1975	Barry White
2006	Live! In Concert	Rubén Blades
2006	Though the Years	Ike & Tina Turner
2005	Original Salsa Kings, Vol. 2	Various Artists
1998	Bulgarian Folk Ensemble	Pirin Singers
1998	King Tubby’s Dancehall Dub	Sly and Robbie
1995	Akasha	Divination
1995	Somnific Flux	Mick Harris
1995	Web	Bill Laswell
1993	Ambient Dub, Vol. 1	Divination
1991	In Concert	Rod Stewart
1984	Jump	Van Halen

== DJ mix ==
Year	Title
1986	Flashback 1983 Disconet Top Tune Medley
1985	1984 Top Tune Medley
1984	The 1983 Disconet Top Tune Medley
1982	The 1980 Disconet Top Tune Medley
1981	The 1979 Disconet Top Tune Medley
1980	No More Medlies (Enough Is Enough)

== Technical ==
Year	Title
1999	Djema El Fna, Mustapha Baqbou
1982	The 1981 Disconet Top Tune Medley
1981	The 1980 Disconet Top Tune Medley
1979	Blow My Mind Medley

== Composer ==
Year	Title	Artist
2014	The Americas: Book of Love, Vol. 1	Logical Drift
2011	Logical Drift	Logical Drift

== Notes ==
- "John T. Matarazzo". AllMusic.
- "John Matarazzo". AllMusic.
- "John Matarazzo". Discogs.
- "John Matarazzo And Mike Arato - 12" Singles - Discography". 45 Worlds.
- "John Matarazzo". Artist Direct.
