= Welp =

Welp may refer to:

- Welp (film), a 2014 Belgian horror movie by Jonas Govaerts
- WELP, a religious radio station located in Easley, South Carolina

== People with the surname ==
- Chris Welp (1964–2015), German professional basketball player
