= Beat Hotel (disambiguation) =

The Beat Hotel was a hotel in Paris.

Beat Hotel may also refer to:

- Beat Hotel (The Bongos album), 1985
- Beat Hotel (Mauro Scocco album), 2003
