= Wurf =

Wurf is a surname. Notable people with this surname include:

- Cameron Wurf (born 1983), Australian triathlete
- Jerry Wurf (1919–1981), American labour leader
- Karl Würf, pseudonym of George H. Scithers (1929–2010), American author

== See also ==
- WVVO, a radio station (1140 AM) licensed to serve Orlando, Florida, United States, which held the call sign WURF from 2018 to 2019
