= WITK =

- Pittston, Pennsylvania; United States
- Broadcast area: Wilkes-Barre - Scranton
- Frequency: 1550 kHz
- Branding: Life Talk 94.7 and 1550

Programming
- Format: Christian radio

Ownership
- Owner: Wilkins Communications Network; (Steel City Radio, Inc.)

History
- First air date: June 21, 1953
- Former call signs: WKQV, WARD, WPTS

Technical information
- Licensing authority: FCC
- Facility ID: 70868
- Class: B
- Power: 10,000 watts (day); 500 watts (night)
- Transmitter coordinates: 41°20′47″N 75°47′05″W
- Translator: 94.7 W234CY (Pittston)

Links
- Public license information: Public file; LMS
- Webcast: WITK 1550 Listen live WITK 94.7 Listen live
- Website: WITK 1550 Online; WITK 94.7 Online

WITK (1550 AM) is a radio station licensed to Pittston, Pennsylvania, United States, and serving Wilkes-Barre and Scranton in Northeast Pennsylvania. The station airs a Christian format and is owned by the Wilkins Communications Network, with the license held by Steel City Radio, Inc.

By WITK programming is also heard on FM translator W234CY at 94.7 MHz.

== History ==
The station signed on the air on June 21, 1953. Its call sign was WPTS, owned by the Midway Broadcasting Company. WPTS was a daytimer, required to leave the air at night. In the 1980s, the station was authorized to move one notch up the dial to 1550 AM. That allowed it to increase its daytime power to 10,000 watts and add nighttime service at 500 watts.

The station was sold in 2007 by Lackawanna County Commissioner Robert C. Cordaro. Steel City Radio, Inc. is part of the Wilkins Communications Network, Inc. of Spartanburg, South Carolina, whose owners, Robert and Luann Wilkins, own 15 other stations in cities such as WWNL (Pittsburgh, Pennsylvania), WYYC (York, Pennsylvania), KCNW (Kansas City, Missouri), WELP (Greenville, South Carolina), WBRI (Indianapolis, Indiana), and WBXR (Huntsville, Alabama).

Former logo
