= Richard Barone =

American rock musician

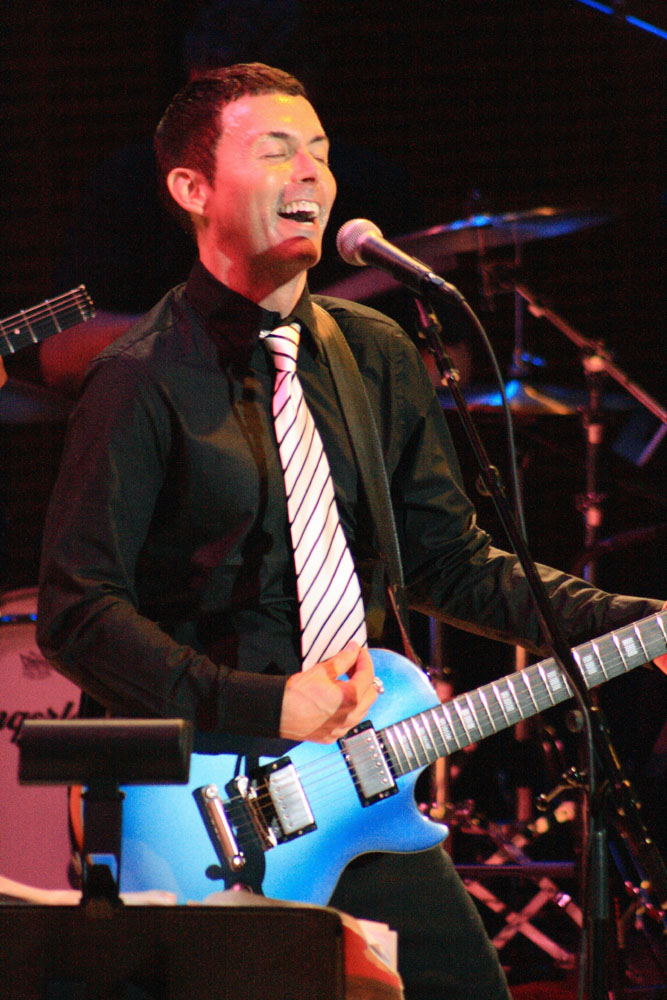
- Richard Barone at Carnegie Hall, New York City, October 1, 2008

Background information
- Born: Tampa, Florida, U.S.
- Genres: Rock, alternative rock, folk rock, power pop, chamber pop
- Occupations: Musician, songwriter, author, musical director, record producer, concert producer
- Instruments: Guitar, bass, Mellotron, Stylophone, Waterphone
- Years active: 1980s–present
- Labels: RCA Records; Sony Music; Legacy Recordings; MCA; Universal; Geffen; MESA/Bluemoon; BMG; Instant Records; Bar/None; Passport Records; The Orchard
- Website: RichardBarone.com

Richard Barone is an American rock musician who first gained attention as frontman for the Bongos. He works as a songwriter, arranger, author, director, and record producer, releases albums as a solo artist, tours, and has created concert events at Carnegie Hall, Hollywood Bowl, SXSW, and New York's Central Park. He teaches the course "Music + Revolution" at The New School's School of Jazz and Contemporary Music, has served on the Board of Governors of The Recording Academy (GRAMMYs), serves on the Advisory Board of Anthology Film Archives, the Board of Trustees of Village Preservation, the Music Making History research unit at Sapienza University of Rome, and hosts the Folk Radio show on WBAI New York.

== Early years ==
Richard Barone was born in Tampa, Florida, and began his music career at age seven on local top-40 radio station WALT (now known as WTIS) as "the Little DJ." By age sixteen he was producing local bands and recorded the idiosyncratic performer Tiny Tim after the two met following a Tampa performance. It was Tiny Tim who first suggested to Barone that he should live in Greenwich Village in New York City, where Tim himself had gotten his start. Moving to New York, Barone lived briefly at the Hotel Chelsea, modeled, and landed small acting roles. Answering an advertisement in the Village Voice newspaper led him to meet the musicians with whom he would form the Bongos, a critically acclaimed new wave band that helped to create the 1980s Hoboken, New Jersey indie pop community.

== Career ==
The Bongos quickly gained favor at New York City music venues as well as at their home venue, Maxwell's in Hoboken. Signed to the British label Fetish Records, they were invited to perform at the Rainbow Theatre in London as part of a concert with other New York bands, a show recorded for the live album Start Swimming, released on Stiff Records. A European tour with the Bush Tetras followed. After a string of independent singles released in the U.K. were compiled in the U.S. as Drums Along the Hudson (PVC), and a major U.S. tour with the B-52s, the group signed with RCA Records. With the advent of MTV, they made a commercial impact with the title song of their label debut, the Barone-penned "Numbers With Wings." The song's accompanying video earned the group a nomination at the first MTV Video Music Awards. Two more albums followed, one for RCA and one for Island Records, the latter of which was to remain unreleased until 2013.

Barone's output as a solo artist has included chamber pop, orchestral, folk, and narrative singer-songwriter material. He has been called a "gifted pop-rock tunesmith" by The New York Times.

Barone released his first solo album, Cool Blue Halo (recorded live at The Bottom Line in New York) in 1987, prior to the Bongos' amicable breakup. Writing in Rolling Stone, Anthony DeCurtis praised Barone's "spare, elegant arrangements" and credited him with fashioning "a kind of rock chamber music." While Trouser Press described the record as "intimate but confused," NPR's Tom Moon, in a more recent assessment, called the album "a plaintive masterpiece," adding: "Cool Blue Halo feels timeless, and maybe even exotic." Moon also credited Barone's version of David Bowie's "The Man Who Sold the World" with influencing Nirvana's own cover of the song on their 1994 album MTV Unplugged in New York. Barone toured for the next two years in Europe and the U.S. in support of "Cool Blue Halo," including a U.S. tour with Suzanne Vega and appearances at the first two Berlin Independence Days music festivals in Berlin, West Germany.

Two studio albums followed: the rock-dominated Primal Dream (MCA Records) in 1990, and the more acoustic-based Clouds Over Eden (Rhino Records), dedicated to his late friend, rock journalist Nicholas Schaffner, in 1994. Trouser Press championed the "fine set of yearning love songs" on Primal Dream, while calling their production and arrangements as a "step backwards" from his debut album. But David Browne, writing in Rolling Stone, gave the album four stars and commented that "Barone is fast moving beyond the limited vocabulary of twelve strings and wimp-pop vocals." Billy Altman, in The New York Times, called his next album, Clouds Over Eden, "unquestionably the most fully realized effort of Barone's career," while Trouser Press described the album as "wrenching and thoroughly worthwhile" and "the great album fans always imagined [Barone] making."

During the recording and writing of Clouds Over Eden, Barone forged a songwriting and performance collaboration with singer/songwriter Jill Sobule, which was to continue for decades, until her death in 2025.

In the mid-1990s, Barone performed and recorded with experimental guitarist Gary Lucas and his group Gods and Monsters, in which Barone handled lead vocals and played Mellotron. In 1995 he recorded Harry Nilsson's "I Guess the Lord Must Be in New York City," with Lucas on guitar, for the tribute album For the Love of Harry: Everybody Sings Nilsson (BMG Records) and produced B-52's frontman Fred Schneider's version of "Coconut" for the same project; and performed it with Schneider on Late Night With Conan O'Brien.

In 1996, he partnered with Phil Ramone and Larry Rosen's N2K Records label to become one of the first five artists, each representing a different genre, to make their music available as purchasable digital downloads on the pioneering Music Boulevard retail site. Amidst the music industry's growing fear of the then-new technology of digital distribution, Barone appeared on The Wall Street Journal Report television show and other programs to explain and promote legal music downloading as a legitimate method of distribution.

In 1997, Barone released Between Heaven and Cello, a live album recorded primarily at NYC's intimate Fez nightclub during a series of "Guitar & Cello" shows. In November he performed "Cello Song" and "Northern Sky" as part of the concert Bryter Later: The Music of Nick Drake at St. Ann's Warehouse in Brooklyn. Also in 1997, Barone partnered with songwriter Jules Shear to co-host "Writers in the Round - Bluebird Style," a monthly series at The Bottom Line that featured Rosanne Cash, Ron Sexsmith, Susan Cowsill, and other singer/songwriters; and he performed on Buster's Spanish Rocketship, the fourth album by David Johansen's alter ego Buster Poindexter, released on Island Records. Barone sang backing vocals on the album, credited as "Richard Barone and the Beautiful Bustiers."

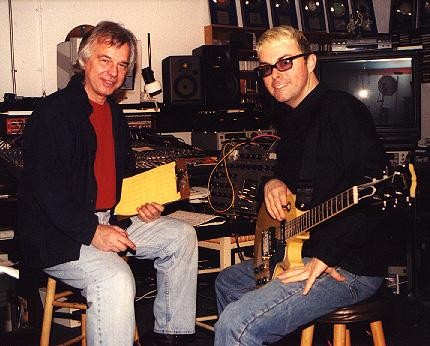
Tony Visconti and Richard Barone in the studio, circa 2000

Toward the end of the 1990s, Barone began collaborating with producer Tony Visconti. Nine of the songs they wrote and recorded together over the next few years were released on the album Glow in 2010. Also during this period, he was invited to sing on sessions Visconti was producing for David Bowie, including the song "Mother," which would be released in 2021. "Yet Another Midnight," a Barone/Visconti composition from this period, appears on the 2023 retrospective box set Produced by Tony Visconti on Demon Records.

In 1999 he provided musical direction and orchestrations for the off-Broadway musical Bright Lights, Big City at the New York Theatre Workshop, working with Rent director Michael Greif. From 1999 to 2004, Barone directed and performed in The Downtown Messiah, a unique, multi-genre interpretation of Handel's baroque oratorio that was broadcast annually in December on over 200 public radio stations nationwide, and combined elements of pop, folk, blues, and jazz.

A boxed set of Barone's first three studio albums was released in Europe in 2000 as The Big Three by Line Records, Germany. In 2001, he contributed a version of "Showdown" to Lynne Me Your Ears - A Tribute to Jeff Lynne. He also sang backing vocals on Visconti's version of "Mr. Blue Sky" on the album, along with Kristeen Young.

As a concert producer/director, Barone began to create large-scale concert events, including three all-star tributes to Peggy Lee at Carnegie Hall, the Hollywood Bowl, and Chicago's Ravinia Festival in 2003 and 2004 in partnership with concert impresario George Wein. The fully orchestrated concerts spanned Lee's entire career and were staged as a musical biography. Performers included Bea Arthur, Nancy Sinatra, Rita Moreno, Debbie Harry, and Shirley Horn. For New York's Central Park SummerStage in 2004 he created The Not-so Great American Songbook, a lovingly irreverent revue of guilty-pleasure hits of the 1970s, featuring an eclectic cast that included Moby and Justin Vivian Bond.

In 2004, Barone interviewed Quincy Jones for the PBS documentary Fever: The Music of Peggy Lee. That year also saw the first release on his own RBM Special Editions label, an anthology of highlights from his back catalog entitled Collection: An Embarrassment of Richard. He also performed in The Blood on the Tracks Project in June at Merkin Hall, a multi-artist tribute to Bob Dylan's landmark 1974 album on its 30th anniversary. He was accompanied by Tony Visconti on bass, Vernon Reid on guitar, and Buddy Cage, who had performed on the original album, on pedal steel.

Also that year, Barone joined 1960s folk-rock icon Donovan for a series of the latter's Beat Café concert events, including nine performances at New York's Joe's Pub, singing and reading excerpts from Allen Ginsberg's Howl. These appearances were the first of many collaborations with Donovan.

Barone increasingly turned his attention to producing, including a duet between Liza Minnelli and pianist/vocalist Johnny Rodgers; a children's album for Jolie Jones (daughter of Quincy Jones); Fred Schneider's solo album Just Fred; and others. He also collaborated with Schneider on songs for British pop star Sophie Ellis-Bextor. Other projects during this time included executive-producing The Nomi Song DVD (Palm Pictures, 2005), which includes his remix of operatic New Wave countertenor Klaus Nomi's "Total Eclipse."

Barone's songs and collaborations, including several written with Jill Sobule, were heard on the TV shows The West Wing, Dawson's Creek, Felicity, and South of Nowhere; as well as in The Nomi Song film.

In 2006, the original three Bongos reunited in the studio with Moby to create a re-make and music video of "The Bulrushes," an early Bongos single, for the re-issue of the group's debut album, released by Cooking Vinyl Records in June 2007. Several Bongos reunion concerts were held, culminating with an outdoor performance at the Hoboken Arts and Music Festival, during which the band was honored with a Mayoral Proclamation and the keys to the city.

In September 2007, Barone's memoir, Frontman: Surviving the Rock Star Myth, with cover and interior photos of the author by Mick Rock, was published by Backbeat/Hal Leonard Books. In late 2007, he began staging a series of musical readings of Frontman with excerpts of the book read by television actress Joyce DeWitt and radio DJ Vin Scelsa, among others. On his birthday, October 1, 2008, he brought Frontman: A Musical Reading to the stage at New York's Carnegie Hall as a benefit for public radio station WFUV, with "Special Guests and Legendary Friends" including Moby, DeWitt, Lou Reed, Garth Hudson, Marshall Crenshaw, Terre and Suzzy Roche, Randy Brecker, Carlos Alomar, and others.

In July 2009, Barone entered the recording studio to complete work on the album he began at age 16 for performer Tiny Tim. In addition to production, Barone also arranged multiple songs and played bass and sang backing vocals on the title track. The album, I've Never Seen a Straight Banana - Rare Moments: Volume 1, was released in October 2009 on Collector's Choice Records.

In May 2010, Barone produced a concert to benefit Anthology Film Archives and to honor avant-garde filmmaker/author Kenneth Anger. Anger performed, along with Lou Reed, Sonic Youth, Jonas Mekas, Moby, actors Ben Foster and Philip Seymour Hoffman and others.

In July that year, Barone collaborated with Pete Seeger (then 91 years old), producing and performing in "Reclaim the Coast: Gulf Coast Oil Spill Benefit" at City Winery in New York. The next month, he and co-producer Matthew Billy recorded Seeger performing a new song that had been debuted publicly at the show. The song and video, "God's Counting on Me, God's Counting on You," recorded while sailing aboard the Sloop Clearwater, were released on Election Day, November 6, 2012.

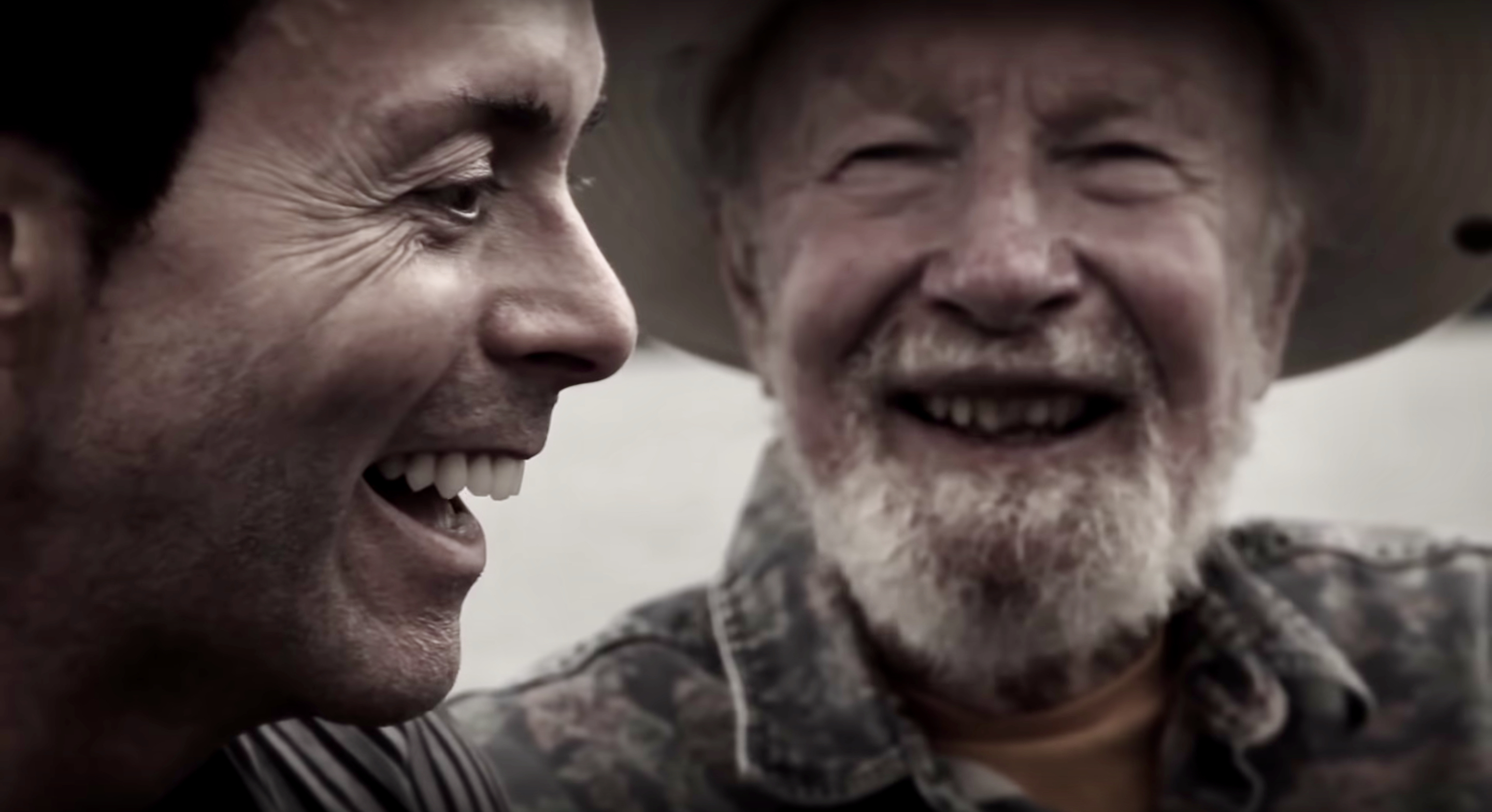
Richard Barone and Pete Seeger during the filming of the "God's Counting on Me, God's Counting on You" music video directed by Damien Drake.

Glow, Barone's fifth solo album, was released in September 2010 on Bar/None Records. A majority of the songs were co-written with co-producer Tony Visconti. Also working on the project were producers Steve Rosenthal, Mike Thorne, and Steve Addabbo; songwriter Paul Williams, and chief engineer Leslie Ann Jones at George Lucas's Skywalker Ranch, among others. A portrait of Barone from the Glow photo sessions appeared in Mick Rock's career retrospective book Exposed: The Faces of Rock n' Roll. A tour of the U.S. and the U.K. followed in early 2011.

In August 2010, Barone was named to the Board of Advisors of Anthology Film Archives by founder Jonas Mekas, and worked closely with Mekas to produce live fundraising events for the organization.

On September 11, 2011, the tenth anniversary of 9/11, Barone released a re-write of the 1894 song "The Sidewalks of New York" with updated lyrics that referenced the World Trade Center attack, co-written and produced by collaborator Matthew Billy.

In Fall 2011, Barone made a cameo appearance and performed a song in the film Mr. Bricks: A Heavy Metal Murder Musical. In December 2011, Barone was appointed a professorship at the Clive Davis Institute of Recorded Music at New York University where he began teaching "Stage Presence: The Art of Performance."

On May 4, 2012, for the 25th anniversary of the Cool Blue Halo album, a reunion concert of all the original musicians was held at City Winery in New York. The concert was filmed and recorded as part of a multi-disc box set released by DigSin Records. In September 2012, he released the first single from the project, "I Belong To Me." In December, I Belong To Me: The 'Cool Blue Halo' Story premiered at Anthology Film Archives, followed by a performance by Barone and musicians from the album. On the occasion of the box set's release, Donovan wrote: "Well-deserved appreciation to Richard on this 25th anniversary release of his album 'Cool Blue Halo.' He displayed the stance early, like the minstrel/actor/playwright of Renaissance London. We met and have shared many a stage together... I have always loved Ricardo's 'Bar-oque and Roll' music. Shine On Ricardo, Shine!"

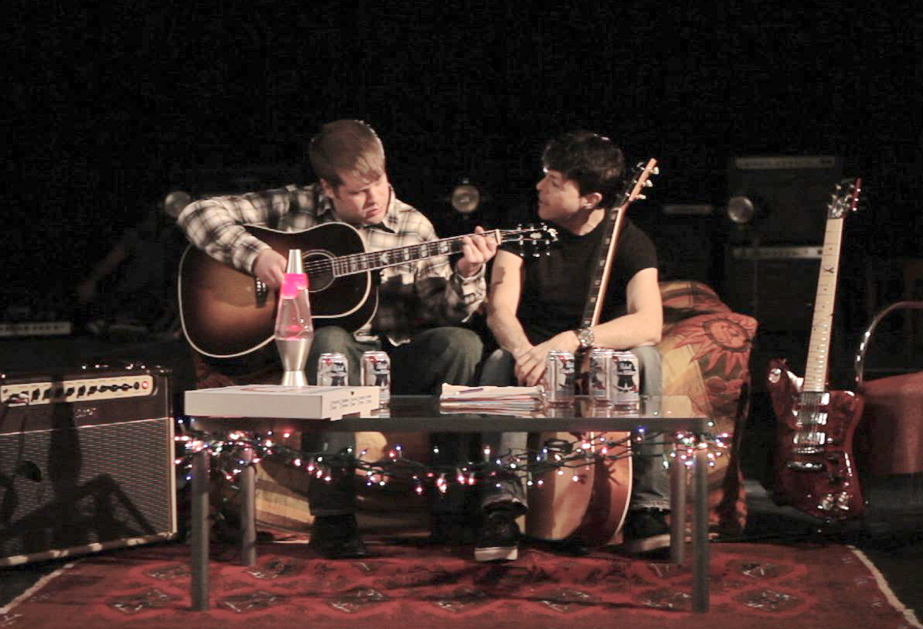
Matthew Billy and Richard Barone on the set of the "Hey, Can I Sleep On Your Futon?" video in April 2012.

Through his work with Pete Seeger, Barone was asked to contribute a song to the Occupy This Album project on Razor & Tie, to benefit the Occupy Wall Street Movement. The four-disc set, subtitled "99 Songs for the 99%", was released on May 15, 2012. Co-written with Matthew Billy, "Hey, Can I Sleep On Your Futon?" was a new song with contemporary references that was inspired by "Brother, Can You Spare A Dime?", a popular song from the Great Depression. Both the track and music video, produced by film students from NYU, were included on the original album download. Barone also performed at a series of concerts with other artists on the Occupy album including Michael Moore, David Amram, and Tom Chapin.

That same month, the feature documentary about Anna Nicole Smith, Addicted to Fame, was released, along with Barone's single "(She's A Real) Live Wire" from the film. He also served as music supervisor for the documentary, directed by David Giancola.

In June 2013, Barone joined forces with Beach Boys co-founder Al Jardine and friends to record a version of Pete Seeger's folk anthem "If I Had A Hammer (The Hammer Song)" for the ONE Campaign, produced by Steve Addabbo at the Shelter Island Sound recording studios in New York. The video was released as ONE Campaign's worldwide protest song project. Matthew Sweet and Susanna Hoffs also recorded Barone's song "The Bulrushes" for their 2013 album Under the Covers, Vol. 3.

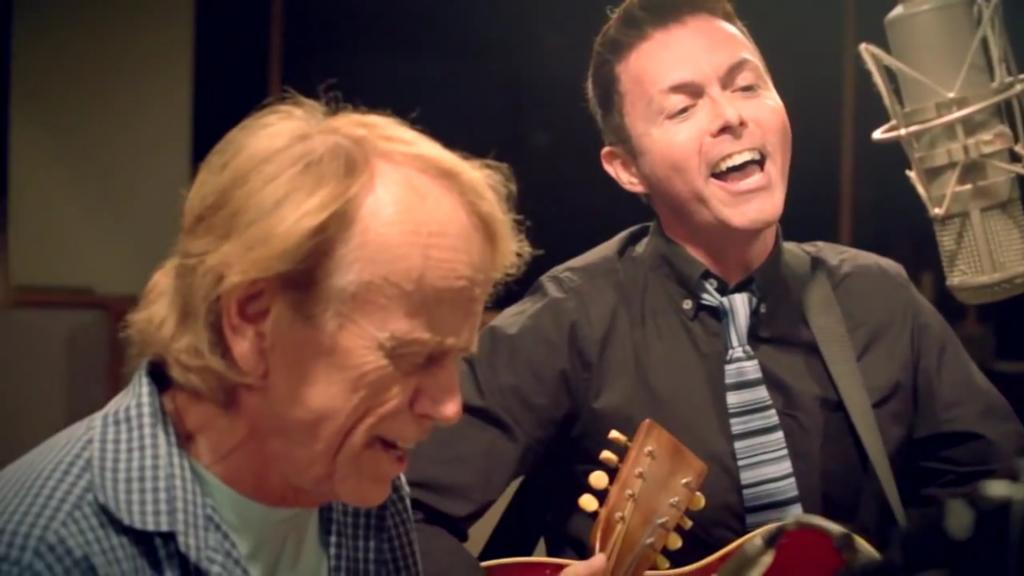
Al Jardine and Richard Barone recording Pete Seeger's "If I Had A Hammer (The Hammer Song)" in June 2013.

On July 31, 2013, the Bongos performed the final concert at their home club, Maxwell's, where the original members had also performed the venue's first show. From the stage Richard announced that the group's long-lost album Phantom Train, recorded in Compass Point, Bahamas in 1986, would finally be released on October 1, 2013 on the re-launched JEM Records.

Barone partnered with Alejandro Escovedo on March 14, 2014, to produce and co-host the first major tribute to the late Lou Reed at the Paramount Theatre in Austin, Texas, as part of the SXSW Music Festival. The three-hour concert included more than 24 acts including Suzanne Vega, Lucinda Williams, Sean Lennon and Spandau Ballet. The house band included members of Blondie, the Patti Smith Group and the Voidoids. Barone also released a recording of Reed's "All Tomorrow's Parties" produced by Chris Seefried with a video by Jonas Mekas, assembled from footage of the early Velvet Underground at Andy Warhol's Factory.

In October 2014 Barone launched "A Circle of Songs," a live, monthly musical talk show series at SubCulture, below the Lynn Redgrave Theater in Greenwich Village. Guests included Eric Andersen, Nellie McKay, Holly Near, and Captain Kirk Douglas of the Roots.

As 2015 began, Barone co-produced, with Tony Visconti, a retrospective concert of Visconti's most familiar work, entitled "The TV Show," at New York's City Winery. He also began work on a new album, Sorrows & Promises: Greenwich Village in the 1960s, composed of songs that emerged from the early days of the Village singer-songwriter scene. The album was curated by music writer/Columbia Records executive Mitchell Cohen with sessions produced by Steve Addabbo, and featured guest appearances from Dion, John Sebastian and David Amram. A series of musical panel discussions chronicling the music on Sorrows & Promises, hosted by the New York Public Library at the historic Jefferson Market Library branch in Greenwich Village, preceded the album's October 14, 2016, release. In March 2017, Barone brought the Sorrows & Promises project to SXSW in Austin, where he hosted a five-and-a-half-hour showcase based on the album.

Back in the studio, Barone produced an album for jazz singer Hilary Kole of songs made famous by Judy Garland and a various-artists holiday album for the Miranda Music label on which he appears, as well as a second album of recordings made by Tiny Tim, entitled Tiny Tim's America, released in summer 2016. He also served as executive producer of Tiny, a musical based on the life of Tiny Tim; and produced a songbook album for composer Tracy Stark, released in October 2016 with performances by Lesley Gore, actress Karen Black, and Nona Hendryx. Barone also contributed liner notes to a vinyl reissue of The Holy Mackerel, the debut of the 1960s band featuring songwriter Paul Williams, and to the 2018 reissue of Williams' 1970 solo debut, Someday Man.

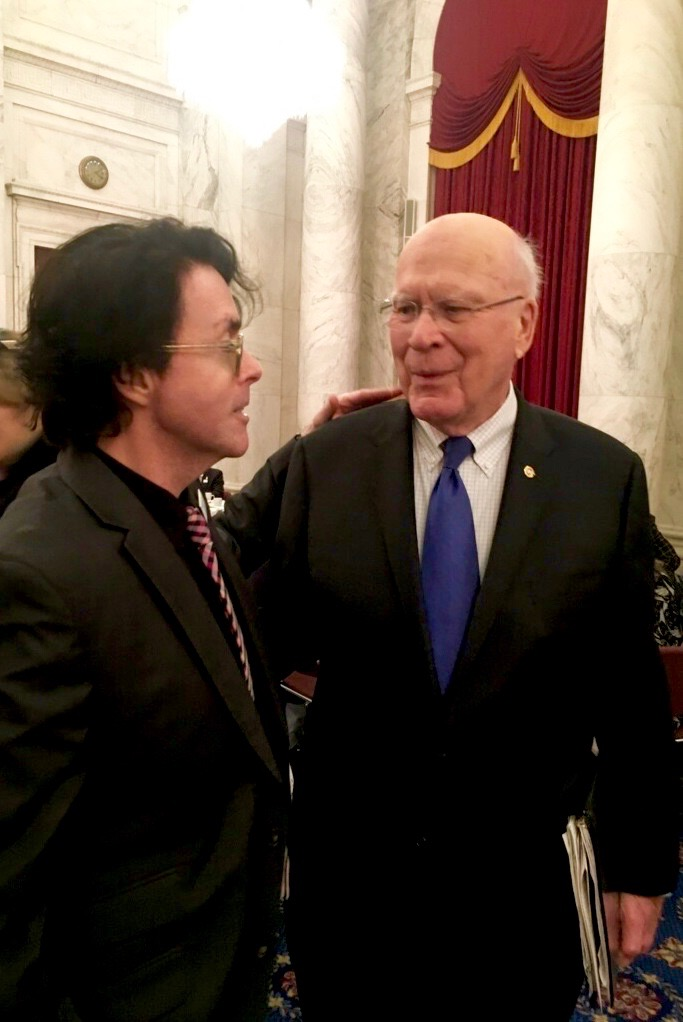
Richard Barone advocates for the Music Modernization Act (MMA), speaking here with Senator Patrick Leahy in April 2018, Washington D.C.

In April 2017, Barone was elected to the board of governors of the New York Chapter of The Recording Academy (The Grammys). He would be re-elected for a second term in 2019.

In December 2017, he entered the studio to begin producing a tribute for Dean Martin's Centennial, featuring New Jersey–based group Remember Jones and Martin's daughter, Deana Martin. In June 2018, Barone would be invited by Martin to perform at the Friars Club as she was honored with the Trobairitz title.

On March 29, 2018, Barone performed in The Bowie Songbook, a reinterpretation of David Bowie's catalogue as part of the Brooklyn Museum's David Bowie Is installation. Also in March 2018, he began a new monthly Village Nights salon series at the Washington Square Hotel in New York. As of 2024 the series is in its fifth season.

In April 2018 it was announced that Barone would host and curate Music + Revolution: Greenwich Village in the 1960s at Central Park SummerStage on August 12 of that year. Performers included Jesse Colin Young, Melanie, José Feliciano, Maria Muldaur, John Sebastian, and others.

The next week it was announced that Richard had joined the faculty of The New School for Jazz and Contemporary Music and was set to teach Music + Revolution, a 15-week music history course centered around 1960s Greenwich Village. As of 2024, Barone has continued to teach Music + Revolution at The New School, along with directing improvisation and songwriting ensembles at the university.

Barone represented the New York Chapter of the Recording Academy for Grammys on the Hill in Washington D.C., in support of the Music Modernization Act (MMA), an omnibus bill supporting the rights of music creators. He met with Senator Patrick Leahy, Congressman David Cicilline, Representative Joseph Crowley, House Speaker Nancy Pelosi, and the office of Senator Sheldon Whitehouse. Barone also met with New York Representative Jerrold Nadler, key supporter of the Music Modernization Act. The bill passed unanimously by both houses of Congress and was signed into law on October 11, 2018.

In January 2019, Barone accompanied Donovan in Jamaica to record a tribute album to Harry Belafonte. Barone also photographed Donovan for the cover of the album's first single. A second project with Donovan that year, a tribute to Brian Jones of the Rolling Stones, was recorded and filmed in Jones' hometown of Cheltenham, England on the fiftieth anniversary of his passing. Barone was the musical director of the project, which celebrated the American blues music that inspired the early Stones.

In fall 2019, a new guitar effect pedal "The Mambo Sun," a collaboration between Barone and boutique pedal manufacturer Left Coast Workshop, was launched for sale. It was designed to replicate Barone's distinctive double-tracked guitar tone.

Joining forces with Glenn Mercer, guitarist/frontman of The Feelies, Barone began performing a series of concerts entitled Hazy Cosmic Jive, a tribute to the mid-1970s experimentation of David Bowie, Brian Eno, Roxy Music, Marc Bolan and others.

In 2020 Barone made a cameo acting appearance, playing himself, in the indie film The Incoherents directed by Jared Barel. He also appeared in the documentaries Tiny Tim: King for a Day and You Don't Know Ivan Julian. He also performed "Streets of New York" on Willie Nile Uncovered, a tribute to the singer-songwriter, released in August 2020.

Barone sang on four tracks on Angelheaded Hipster: The Songs of Marc Bolan & T.Rex produced by Hal Willner, contributing backing vocals to tracks by Todd Rundgren, Lucinda Williams, Kesha, and Helga Davis. The album was released on September 4, 2020 by BMG Records. In tribute to another of his inspirations, Barone performed a medley of "Revolution" and "Power to the People" for JEM Records Celebrates John Lennon, released on the 80th anniversary of Lennon's birth, October 9, 2020. He also contributed an essay about Pylon for the book included in the comprehensive Pylon Box vinyl box set released on November 6, 2020, by New West Records.

On January 8, 2021, David Bowie's cover of John Lennon's song "Mother," for which Barone had sung harmony vocals with producer Tony Visconti at the original session in 1998, was posthumously released on limited edition vinyl and digital streaming on Parlophone Records. The single was released to commemorate Bowie's seventy-fourth birthday. In July, the Bongos' Beat Hotel - Expanded Edition was released by RCA Records. Later that month, Barone contributed two tracks to JEM Records Celebrates Brian Wilson.

On January 20, 2022, he began hosting the Folk Radio show on WBAI Radio, New York. The program broadcasts live on Thursdays at 10 p.m. ET on 99.5 FM, and streamed live on WBAI.org.

Barone's second book, Music + Revolution: Greenwich Village in the 1960s, was published by Backbeat Books/Rowman & Littlefield on September 15, 2022. A major launch event was held at the Museum of the City of New York on October 13, 2022. Performers included Carolyn Hester, Suzanne Vega, and David Amram.

On September 15, 2023, at the invitation of Tony Visconti, Barone performed at the all-star Marc Bolan 45th Anniversary Celebration Concert in London at O2 Shepherd's Bush Empire, where Visconti conducted the string section.

In October 2023, the Bongos released the Barone-penned "Rock the Christmas Cheer!" holiday single, on RCA Records; the first recording of a new Bongos song since 1986.

On November 13, 2023, Barone produced Mazzoni Center Honors Stephen Schwartz, an all-star, Broadway-themed gala held at the Kimmel Center in Philadelphia.

That same week, on November 19, 2023, he returned to Carnegie Hall to present Music + Revolution at Carnegie Hall, a concert based on the book. The sold-out concert, which featured performances by Tom Paxton, Jose Feliciano, Vernon Reid, The Bongos, and many others, was a benefit for MusiCares and the Greenwich Village Society for Historic Preservation.

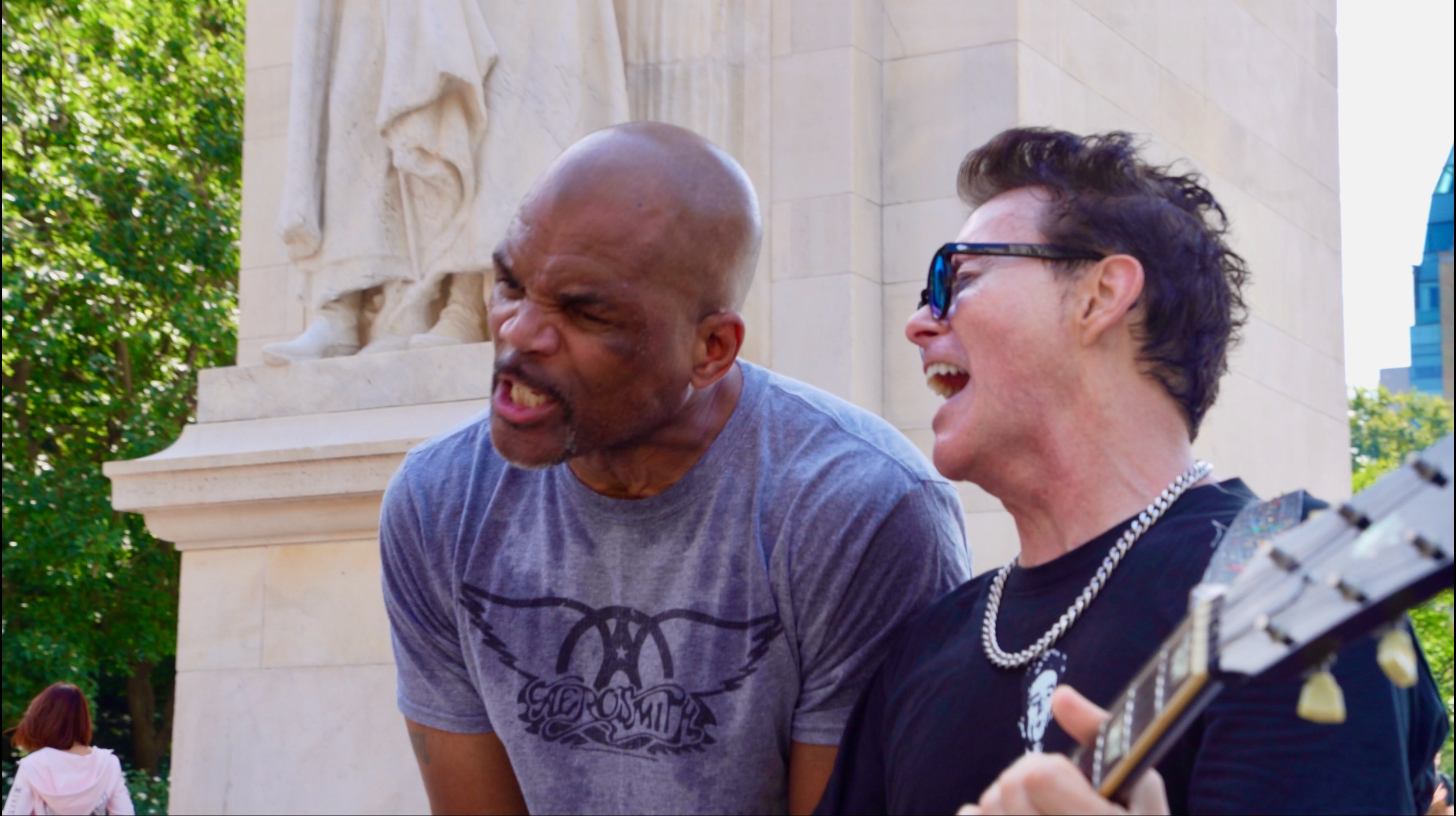
Darryl "DMC" McDaniels and Richard Barone in Washington Square Park, NYC, as they appear in the music video for "All Fall Down," September 2024.

On September 28, 2024, Barone produced Bolan Birthday Bash: A Celebration of Marc Bolan & T. Rex in Los Angeles featuring members of The Bangles and Cowsills among many others. On November 18, 2024 he produced a tribute to Star Trek star and social activist George Takei in Philadelphia, for Mazzoni Center Honors. See Concert Productions below.

Barone's single, "All Fall Down", featuring and co-written by Darryl "DMC" McDaniels, was released on September 20, 2024 on Richard Gottehrer's Instant Records label. The song was released in multiple genres, including Rock, Folk, Alt-Country, and Hip-Hop versions.

On May 23, 2025, the Bongos' live album The Shroud of Touring: Live in 1985 was released on CD, followed by the streaming release on September 19th. In June 2025, Barone toured the southern U.S. states of Georgia, Alabama, Arkansas, Mississippi, and Tennessee with Pylon Reenactment Society. In December 2025, Barone lectured for week of classes on the topic of music and politics and performed at Sapienza University of Rome at the invitation of Professor Marilisa Merolla.

In January 2026, it was announced that Barone's duo album Nuts & Bolts, recorded in 1983 with fellow Bongo James Mastro and producer Mitch Easter, was scheduled to be re-released for the first time in April 2026 in an expanded CD edition by Iconoclassic Records. It was also announced in January that Barone's Village Nights music series would relaunch in March 2026, presented by the Greenwich Village Society for Historic Preservation, with four events to be held at the historic venue The Bitter End, each celebrating a specific decade in the history of the Greenwich Village music scene.

In May 2026, Barone and Glenn Mercer released the limited edition LP Hazy Cosmic Jive, a tribute to 1970s experimental glam rock that covered songs by Bowie, Roxy Music, T. Rex, and others, on blue vinyl. In June, a tribute to Badfinger's vocalist/songwriter Pete Ham, Just Look Inside the Cover--Songs of Pete Ham, was released on Y&T Music, featuring Barone's version of Ham's "I'm Only Human" from Ham's 1970 demo recording.

== Selected discography ==
- Nuts and Bolts - Richard Barone & James Mastro (1983); produced by Barone, Mastro, and Mitch Easter (Passport Records); Deluxe Reissue (2026, Iconoclassic Records)
- Cool Blue Halo (1987), recorded live at The Bottom Line, New York City (Passport Records); Deluxe Edition (2012, DigSin/RBM Special Editions)
- Primal Dream (1990), produced by Richard Gottehrer and Don Dixon (MCA Records)
- Primal Cuts (1991), remixes by Ben Grosse and live tracks (Line Records, Germany)
- Clouds over Eden (1993), produced by Hugh Jones (MESA/Bluemoon/Atlantic Records)
- Between Heaven and Cello (1997), recorded live (Line Records, Germany)
- The Big Three (2000), box set (Line Records, Germany)
- Collection: An Embarrassment of Richard (2004), compilation (RBM Special Editions)
- Glow (2010), produced by Tony Visconti. Additional tracks produced by Steve Addabbo, and Steve Rosenthal (Bar/None Records); Deluxe Edition (2019)
- Collection 2: Before & Afterglow (2011), compilation (RBM Special Editions/Billy Barone Productions)
- Cool Blue Halo: 25th Anniversary Concert (2012), Deluxe live album/concert movie, CD/DVD, produced by Matthew Billy (DigSin/RBM Special Editions)
- Sorrows & Promises: Greenwich Village in the 1960s (2016), produced by Steve Addabbo (RBM Special Editions/The Orchard; Ship To Shore PhonoCo)
- All Fall Down (featuring Darryl "DMC" McDaniels) E.P. (2024), produced by Richard Barone; Remixes by Steve Addabbo, Johnny Juice (Public Enemy), Lou Holtzman, and Alonzo Vargas (Instant Records)
- Hazy Cosmic Jive - Richard Barone & Glenn Mercer vinyl L.P. (2026), produced by Glenn Mercer (Pine Hill Records)

== Contributions ==
- For the Love of Harry: Everybody Sings Nilsson (1995), MusicMasters Records/BMG – "I Guess The Lord Must Be in New York City"
- Jill Sobule (1995), Lava Records/Atlantic Records - Backing vocals on several tracks
- Refuge: A Benefit for the People of Kosova (1999), ARC/The Orchard – "A Call To Prayer"
- Our Favorite Texan: Bobby Fuller Four-ever! (1999), #9 Records, Japan – "Nancy Jean"
- Gary Lucas - Improve the Shining Hour (2000), Rare Lumiere Records - "Follow"
- Lynne Me Your Ears – A Tribute to the Music of Jeff Lynne (2001), Not Lame Recordings – "Showdown"
- Simply Mad, Mad, Mad, Mad About The Loser's Lounge (2001), Zilcho Records – "Everybody's Talking"
- The Nomi Song Remixes (2005), Palm Pictures – "Total Eclipse: The Atomic Party Mix"
- October Project Uncovered: The Songs of Emil Adler & Julie Flanders (2006), October Project Recordings – "One Dream"
- Gary Lucas - Coming Clean (2006), Mighty Quinn Productions - "Land's End"
- Remember the Coop! A Tribute to Alice Cooper (2010), Main Man Records - "Hello, Hooray!"
- Take It or Leave It: A Tribute to the Queens of Noise (The Runaways tribute) (2011), Main Man Records - "Hollywood"
- Occupy This Album (2012), Razor & Tie – "Hey, Can I Sleep On Your Futon?"
- A New York Holiday (2015), Miranda Music – "I've Got My Love To Keep Me Warm"
- Jill Sobule Nostalgia Kills (2018), Pinko Records - "Island of Lost Things" - backing vocals, producer
- Joolz Juke: Blues Tribute to Brian Jones by his Grandson Joolz Jones (2019), Donovan Discs – "Who Do You Love?", "Not Fade Away"
- Willie Nile: Uncovered (2020), Paradiddle Records – "Streets of New York"
- AngelHeaded Hipster – The Songs Of Marc Bolan And T. Rex (2020), BMG Records – Backing vocals on several tracks.
- Jem Records Celebrates John Lennon (2020), Jem Records – "Revolution/Power to the People"
- David Bowie - "Mother"/"Tryin' to Get to Heaven" (single) (2021), Parlophone Records/ISO Records - Backing vocals on "Mother"
- Jem Records Celebrates Brian Wilson (2021), Jem Records – "In My Room", "I Get Around"
- Jem Records Celebrates Pete Townshend (2022), Jem Records – "Let's See Action"
- We All Shine On: A Tribute to the Year 1970 (2022), SpyderPop Records – "Riki Tiki Tavi" (Donovan)
- Tribute to a Songpoet: Songs of Eric Andersen (2022), Y&T Music – "Close the Door Lightly"
- Produced by Tony Visconti (2023), Box Set, Demon Records/BBC Studios – "Yet Another Midnight" (Barone/Visconti)
- The Feelies – Some Kinda Love (2023), Bar None Records – "Oh, Sweet Nothing" (live)
- WNYC Radio: Centennnial Song Project (2024), "Let's Do It, Let's Fall in Love"
- Jem Records Celebrates David Bowie (2025), Jem Records – "Starman - Live"
- Tav Falco - Desire on Ice (2025), Frenzi / ORG Music – acoustic guitar
- Keep Me in Your Heart: The Songs of Warren Zevon (2026), Paradiddle Records – "Keep Me in Your Heart"
- Just Look Inside The Cover - Songs Of Pete Ham (2026), Y&T Music - "I'm Only Human"

== Concert productions ==
- "The Downtown Messiah" – Various Artists – The Bottom Line; Winter Garden Atrium at World Financial Center NYC, Broadcast via Public Radio International, 1999–2004. POP REVIEW; Let the Good Tidings Roll With Rockin' and Stompin'
- "There'll Be Another Spring: A Tribute to Miss Peggy Lee" – Various Artists – Carnegie Hall NYC, Broadcast via NPR, 2003. There'll Be Another Spring – A Tribute to Miss Peggy Lee
- "There'll Be Another Spring: A Tribute to Miss Peggy Lee" – Various Artists – Hollywood Bowl, Los Angeles, CA THE HOLLYWOOD BOWL KICKS OFF 25th YEAR OF "JAZZ AT THE BOWL" WITH TRIBUTE TO JAZZ LEGEND PEGGY LEE; Ravinia Festival, Chicago, 2004. RAVINIA FEST 2004 - Windy City Times News
- "The (Not So) Great American Songbook" – Various Artists – SummerStage in Central Park NYC, 2004.
- "Frontman: A Musical Reading" – Various Artists - Carnegie Hall NYC, 2008.
- "Reclaim the Coast: Benefit for the BP Oil Spill Cleanup" – Pete Seeger and Various Artists – City Winery NYC, 2010.
- "Return to the Pleasuredome: Benefit for Anthology Film Archives" – Various Artists including Lou Reed, Sonic Youth, and Kenneth Anger – Hiro Ballroom NYC, 2010.
- "2011 Film Preservation Honors & 40th Anniversary Benefit Concert" – Marina Abramović, Ólöf Arnalds, Albert Maysles, Jonas Mekas, more. – City Winery NYC, 2011.
- "The SXSW Tribute to Lou Reed" (Co-produced with Alejandro Escovedo) – Various Artists – Paramount Theater, Austin Texas, 2014. Lou Reed Tribute: An Epic, Weird Night at SXSW for ‘One Motherf—er of a Songwriter’
- "The TV Show: Tony Visconti & Friends" (Co-produced with Tony Visconti) – Various Artists – City Winery NYC, 2015.
- "Sorrows & Promises SXSW: Greenwich Village in the 1960s" – Various Artists including Jesse Colin Young, Robyn Hitchcock – SXSW, Driskill Hotel, Austin Texas, 2017. SXSW Music Live: Richard Barone Presents Greenwich Village in the Sixties
- "Music + Revolution: Greenwich Village in the 1960s, hosted by Richard Barone" – Various Artists – SummerStage in Central Park, NYC, August 12, 2018. Greenwich Village in the ’60s: Concert ReviewA once-in-a-lifetime tribute to the music of ’60s Greenwich Village (REVIEW, SETLIST, VIDEOS)
- "Remembering Jonas: A Tribute to Jonas Mekas" – Various Artists including Patti Smith, John Zorn, Jim Jarmusch, Steve Buscemi, Lee Ranaldo, others. – City Winery NYC, February 21, 2019.
- "Mazzoni Center Honors Stephen Schwartz" – Various Artists – Verizon Hall, Kimmel Center, Philadelphia PA, November 13, 2023. Mazzoni Center Honors
- "Music + Revolution at Carnegie Hall" – Various Artists – Carnegie Hall NYC, November 19, 2023.
- "Bolan Birthday Bash! A Celebration of Marc Bolan & T.Rex" – Rolan Bolan, Debbi Peterson, Vicki Peterson of The Bangles, John Cowsill, Gloria Jones, others. The Sun Rose, Pendry Hotel, West Hollywood, CA, September 28, 2024.
- "Mazzoni Center Honors George Takei" – Various Artists – Verizon Hall, Kimmel Center, Philadelphia PA, November 18, 2024. Mazzoni Center Honors
- "Mazzoni Center Honors Melba Moore" – Various Artists – Verizon Hall, Kimmel Center, Philadelphia PA, November 3, 2025. Mazzoni Center Honors

== Filmography ==
- Next Year in Jerusalem (1997), directed by David Nahmod; Mr. Sobule Next Year in Jerusalem
- Mr. Bricks: A Heavy Metal Murder Musical (2011), directed by Travis Campbell; Self Mr. Bricks: A Heavy Metal Murder Musical
- The Incoherents (2019), directed by Jared Barel; Self The Incoherents
- You Don't Know Ivan: Ivan Julian (2020), directed by Geoffray Barbier; Self You Don't Know Ivan Julian
- Tiny Tim: King for a Day (2020), directed by Johan von Sydow; Self Tiny Tim: King for a Day
- Angelheaded Hipster: The Songs of Marc Bolan & T.Rex (2022), directed by Ethan Silverman; Self Angelheaded Hipster: The Songs of Marc Bolan & T. Rex
- Ghosts of the Chelsea Hotel (And Other Rock & Roll Stories) (2023), directed by Danny Garcia; Self Ghosts of the Chelsea Hotel (and Other Rock & Roll Stories)
- The Jersey Sound (2024) Directed by Fulvio Cecere and Randy Dominguez; Self The Jersey Sound

== Bibliography ==
- Frontman: Surviving the Rock Star Myth, Backbeat/Hal Leonard Books, 2007. ISBN 0-87930-912-1, ISBN 978-0-87930-912-1
- The White Label Promo Preservation Society: 100 Flop Albums You Ought to Know, HoZac Books, 2021. Essay on T.Rex. ISBN 978-1-7359985-1-0
- Music + Revolution: Greenwich Village in the 1960s, Backbeat Books/Rowman & Littlefield, 2022. ISBN 978-1493063017
- The White Label Promo Preservation Society: Volume 2, HoZac Books, 2023. Essay on Tiny Tim. ISBN 979-8-9881170-1-8
- Tape Op Magazine, frequent contributor
- Magnet Magazine, frequent contributor
