= WONQ =

Oviedo, Florida; United States
- Broadcast area: Orlando metropolitan area
- Frequency: 1030 kHz
- Branding: Party FM

Programming
- Language: Spanglish
- Format: Rhythmic hot AC

Ownership
- Owner: Florida Broadcasters; (Q-Broadcasting Corp)
- Sister stations: WLBE; WVVO

History
- First air date: November 21, 1992
- Former call signs: WCAG (1989–1992, CP)

Technical information
- Licensing authority: FCC
- Facility ID: 21760
- Class: B
- Power: 45,000 watts (day); 1,700 watts (night)
- Transmitter coordinates: 28°40′30″N 81°10′0″W
- Translators: 93.9 W230AL (Union Park); 103.5 W278CN (Eatonville)

Links
- Public license information: Public file; LMS
- Webcast: Listen live
- Website: www.partyfmorlando.com

WONQ (1030 AM) is a commercial radio station licensed to Oviedo, Florida, United States, and serving the Orlando metropolitan area. Owned by Florida Broadcasters via Q-Broadcasting Corporation, it features a bilingual rhythmic Hot AC format branded “Party FM”. The station airs Orlando Magic basketball games and Orlando City SC soccer matches in Spanish.

The transmitter is located on Van Arsdale Street in Oviedo.

== History ==
The station signed on the air on November 21, 1992. It has always been owned by Florida Broadcasters. The original power was 10,000 watts days and 500 watts nights, with studios on Semoran Boulevard in Casselberry, Florida.

The station changed formats from Spanish News/Talk to salsa on April 29, 2019, with George Mier returning as Program Director.

From 2019 until 2021, the station was simulcast on FM translator W258DD Orlando at 99.5 FM, and was branded as "Viva FM." It billed itself as the only mainland U.S. station playing 100 percent salsa music.

Logo as La Grande 1030 AM

Logo as Viva FM

Logo as Romantica Orlando

On December 31, 2021, WONQ flipped back to its previous Spanish-language oldies and popular adult standards under its former name "La Grande 1030", while the salsa music format, previously heard on WONQ, moved to WVVO.

In November 2023, WONQ brought back the "Romantica" brand (originally used from 2001 to 2003), airing romantic pop/rock ballads, as well as occasional brokered programming.

On April 26, 2025, at 12:00 pm, after playing "Se Acabo" by Lucía Mendéz, WONQ announced an upcoming format change set to happen on May 1, 2025 at 5:00 pm, promoting "a party coming to the radio", it began stunting with the songs "Don't Stop The Party" by Pitbull, "Party Rock Anthem" by LMFAO, "In Da Club" by 50 Cent, "Pa'l Party" by Nicky Jam, "Mi Gente" by J Balvin, and "EL CLúB" by Bad Bunny.

At the promised time on May 1st, 2025, at 5:00 pm ET, WONQ launched a bilingual rhythmic Hot AC radio format, branded as “Party FM”, with “SexyBack” by Justin Timberlake being the first song played.

On July 2, 2025, WONQ announced that “Lil Shawn” Power joined the station as the afternoon host. He previously spent 14 years on “Power 95.3” WPYO, including as a morning and afternoon host, and as a morning host on “FLY 103.1” WFYY between mid-to-late 2022 and early 2024.
