= Jay Frank (music executive) =

American music executive (1971–2019)

Jay Frank (December 24, 1971 – October 13, 2019) was an American author and music industry executive. He was the owner of DigSin, a digital record label that distributes content free to subscribers.

== Biography ==
Frank was born in Livingston, New Jersey. He earned a Bachelor of Science degree from Ithaca College. At the start of his career, he worked variously as the manager of a music venue, programming broadcast radio stations, and creating two local music video shows. He then acted as a marketing and A&R for Ignition Records before serving as senior music director at The Box Music Network. Prior to joining CMT in 2007, Frank was vice president of music programming and label relations for Yahoo! Music and the senior vice president of music strategy. He joined Universal Music Group in 2015, and at the time of his death, was senior vice president of global streaming marketing.

Frank was a blogger and published his first book, Futurehit. DNA, in 2009. In the book, Frank studies what elements have contributed to past hit songs, including available technology, song structure, and instrumentation, and fifteen points he believes songwriters today must consider if they want to write hit songs. His second book, Hack Your Hit, offers low cost marketing tips for musicians utilizing tricks with social networks. "Futurehit.DNA" has garnered mostly positive reviews.

Frank sat on the board of directors of the Academy of Country Music, the Community Foundation of Middle Tennessee, and Leadership Music, and was a member of NARAS, the CRS Marketing Committee, and Leadership Music Digital Summit.

Frank spoke about music technology at such conferences as The New Music Seminar, South by Southwest, Canadian Music Week, ASCAP Expo, Digital Music Forum, MusExpo, CMJ, SF Music Tech Summit, Mobile Entertainment Summit, and MIDEM. He was an instructor at the Rock and Load Music Group 2010 University Event, and spoke at NMS and SXSW conferences, among others.

Frank died from cancer on October 13, 2019, at age 47.
