= XETEC-AM =

Radio Chiapas station in Tecpatán, Chiapas

- Tecpatán, Chiapas, Mexico; Mexico
- Broadcast area: Tecpatán, Chiapas
- Frequency: 1140 AM
- Branding: Radio Tecpatán

Programming
- Format: Public radio

Ownership
- Owner: Government of the State of Chiapas

History
- First air date: March 25, 1999
- Call sign meaning: TECpatán

Technical information
- Power: 1 kW day/0.5 kW night
- Transmitter coordinates: 17°08′21″N 93°18′21″W

Links
- Website: Radio Tecpatán

XETEC-AM is a radio station on 1140 AM in Tecpatán, Chiapas, in Mexico. It is part of the state-owned Radio Chiapas state network and is known as Radio Tecpatán.

XETEC signed on March 25, 1999.

Previous logo

In November 2017, the IFT awarded a separate FM public concession to the Sistema Chiapaneco de Radio, Televisión y Cinematografía for XHTECP-FM 95.1, a class A FM station. This was never built, with the state government surrendering it on May 25, 2021, citing budget reallocation due to COVID-19.
