= Lauren Shera =

American folk musician and guitarist (born c. 1988)

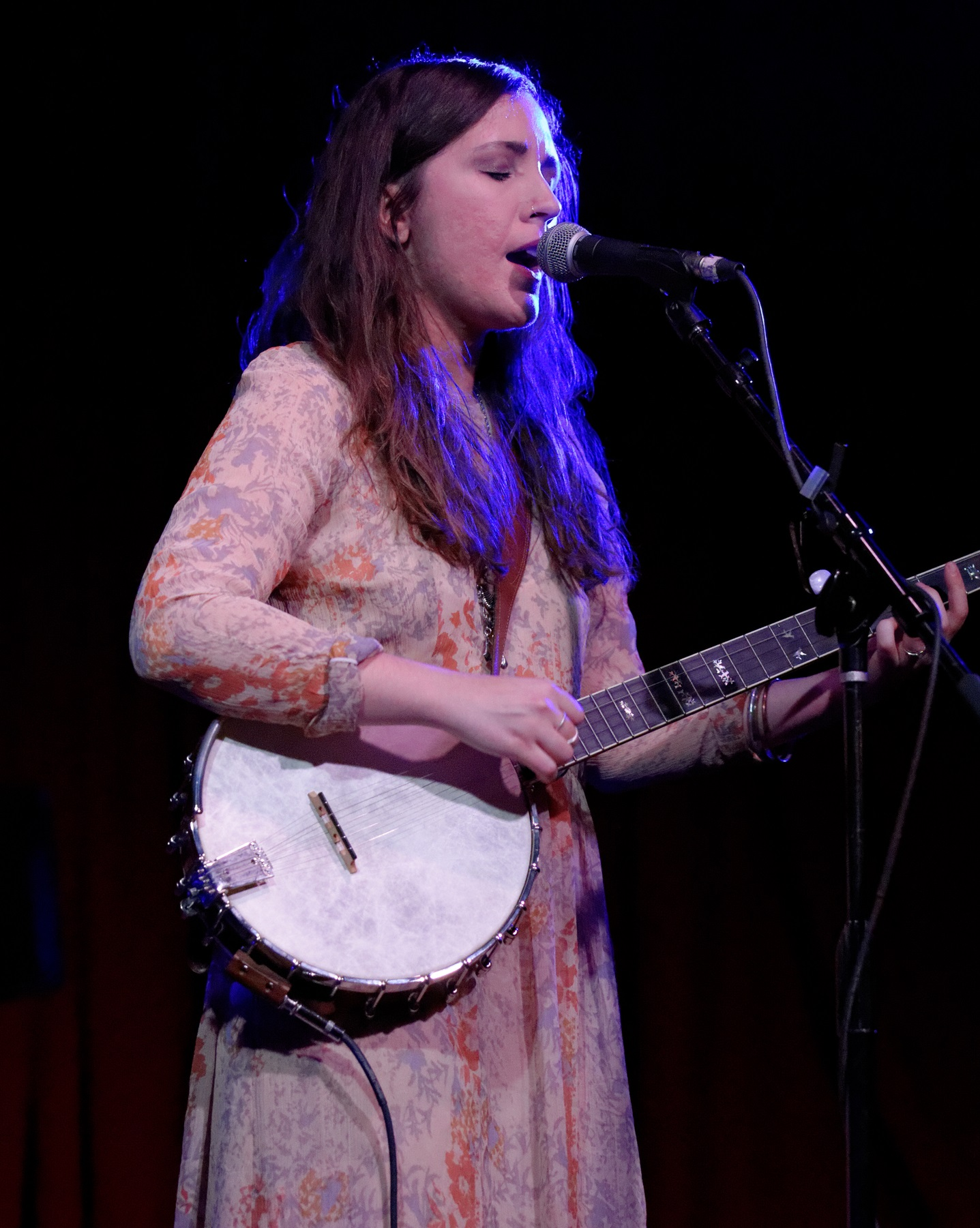
Shera performing at the Hotel Cafe in 2015

Lauren Shera (born c. 1988) is a former American folk musician and guitarist.

Shera spent her early life in New York City, surrounded by a wide range of musicians. When she was 13, her family relocated to northern California; around this time, she picked up the guitar.

In 2008, she studied at the Old Town School of Folk Music in Chicago, where she honed her skills as a singer and a musician while learning ukulele and clawhammer banjo. In 2014, she released the single "Hell's Bells" through record label DigSin.

As of 2025, she had given up music professionally and started a career as a lactation consultant based in Nashville, under the name Lauren Levine.

== Studio work ==
Lauren self-released her first album, "In My Bones", on November 30, 2006, at age 18. Along with its release she began to tour nationally and expand her audience from the Northern California coffee house base that she had developed.

Shera’s sophomore album, "Once I Was A Bird," produced by Andy Zenczak at Gadgetbox Studios in Santa Cruz, was released on June 7, 2011. The album received critical acclaim from outlets such as My Old Kentucky Blog, who called Shera "A major talent lying in wait." Magnet Magazine said "You might not know Shera now, but trust us, that is about to change” and American Songwriter called her a "rising indie-folk star."

Shera released her third album, Gold and Rust, in 2015.

== Performance history ==
Shera has shared the stage with artists such as Ray LaMontagne, Jason Mraz, Phil Lesh, Shawn Colvin, Billy Bragg, Nanci Griffith, Kristin Hersh, Joan Osborne, Jackie Greene, and Abigail Washburn.

She has performed at festivals such as Bonnaroo, the High Sierra Music Festival, Sausalito Music and Arts Festival, Monterey Music Summit and South by Southwest. When she was 18, she was also invited to perform at the Bob Dylan Tribute Concert at New York City’s Avery Fisher Hall.

Lauren was hand-picked by Ben Lovett of Mumford and Sons to play on the first United States tour of Communion, which Lovett operates. Lauren will play beside Matthew and the Atlas and David Mayfield on over 21 dates nationally.

=== Honeymoon ===
Shera also performed in the band Honeymoon along with Sara Bollwinkel and Christina Bailey. The group, which was based in Santa Cruz, performed a blend of indie-folk, traditional roots and pop. Currently on hiatus due to bi-coastal bandmates, honeymoon plans to continue writing and performing together when schedules and geography permit it.
