= WLBE =

Radio station in Leesburg, Florida

Simulcasts WAMA Tampa
- Leesburg-Eustis, Florida; United States
- Broadcast area: Lake County, Florida
- Frequency: 790 kHz
- Branding: La Ley 107.7FM Y 1550AM

Programming
- Format: Silent

Ownership
- Owner: George and Esperanza Arroyo; (Q-Broadcasting Corporation)
- Sister stations: WAMA, WONQ, WTIS, WVVO

History
- First air date: 1947
- Former call signs: WEUS
- Call sign meaning: W Leesburg-Eustis

Technical information
- Licensing authority: FCC
- Facility ID: 73202
- Class: B
- Power: 5,000 watts day 1,000 watts night
- Transmitter coordinates: 28°49′42.00″N 81°47′10.00″W

Links
- Public license information: Public file; LMS
- Webcast: Listen Live
- Website: laleyradio.com

WLBE (790 AM) is a radio station which is currently silent but most recently was broadcasting a Regional Mexican format. Licensed to Leesburg-Eustis, Florida, United States, it serves the Lake County area and reaches into parts of nearby Marion County as well. The station is currently owned by Q-Broadcasting Corporation.

The station originally signed on in 1947 using the call letters WEUS, but changed to WLBE effective October 19, 1948.

The move from Floradel Avenue to Radio Road took place in 1950, the same year Paul Husebo bought it. Wendell Husebo sold the station in 1962 after spending 37 hours on the air in 1960 during Hurricane Donna. With all the changes over the years, WLBE aired Leesburg High School sports. Bob Andrews worked in radio for 60 years, starting when WLBE signed on, and returning after an absence in 1980 to host "The Breakfast Club".

Harry Reiner Revocable Trust owned the station starting in 1983. In 2013, the primary format, starting each afternoon, was oldies from the 50s, 60 and 70s, targeting senior citizens, with talk shows providing information four hours each day, a sports show on weekends, religious programming including gospel music on Sunday, and the "Lake County Auction Show". One of the shows included a "swap shop".

Before signing off, it was "Real Country AM 790" with "Today's Stars and Legends". As of June 22, 2019, the station was off the air.

It returned to the air but on July 10, 2025 it requested silent STA.
