= The Bongos =

American band

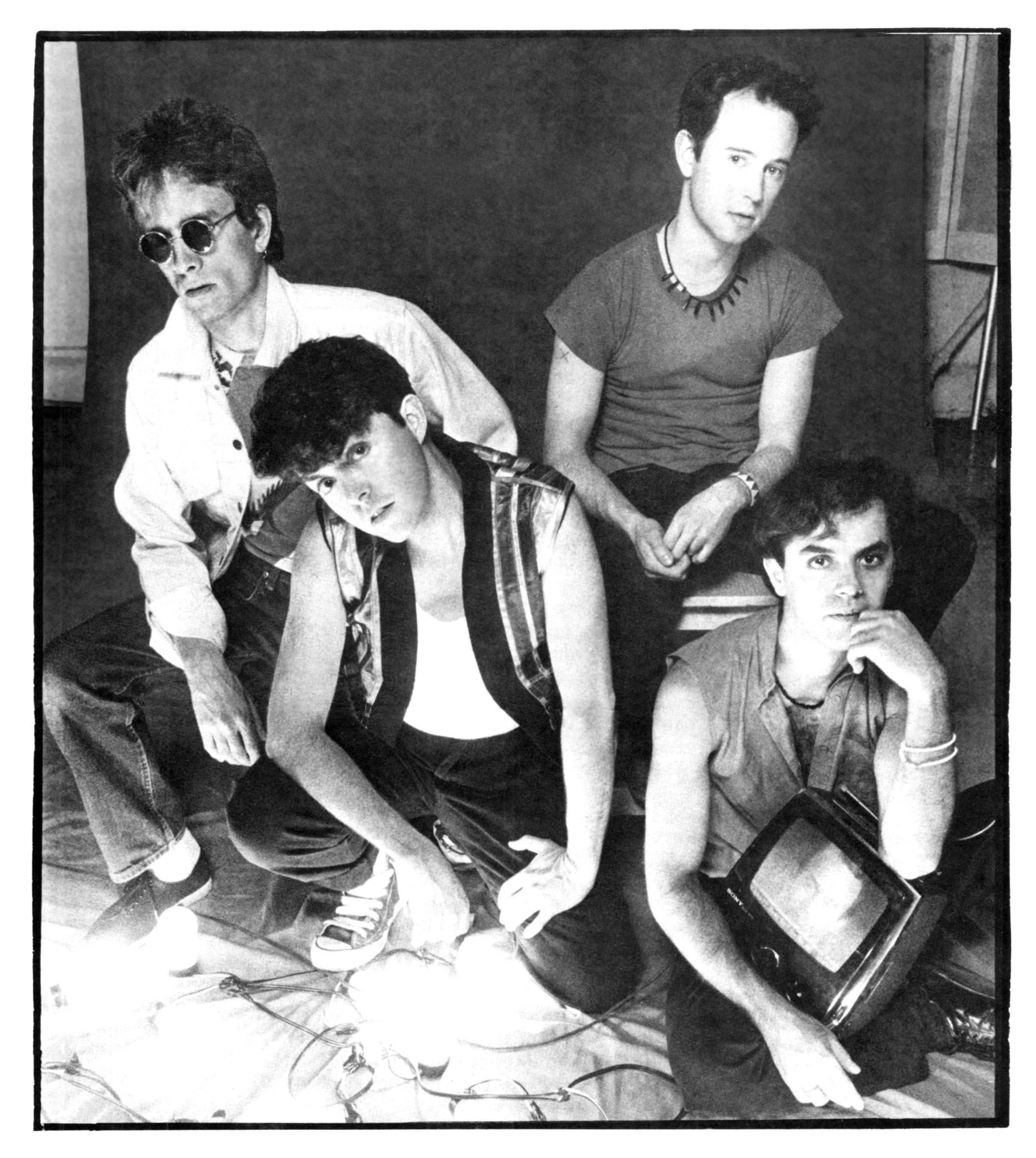
- The Bongos in 1985, photographed by Phil Marino. Left to right: Rob Norris, Richard Barone, Frank Giannini, and James Mastro.

Background information
- Origin: Hoboken, NJ, U.S.
- Genre: Power pop
- Years active: 1980–1987, 2006–present
- Labels: RCA Records, Sony BMG, Sony Legacy, Razor & Tie, Fetish Records, PVC Records, Stiff, Cooking Vinyl, Jem Records
- Members: Richard Barone; Rob Norris; Frank Giannini; James Mastro

The Bongos are a power pop band from Hoboken, New Jersey, that emerged from the New York City arts scene, primarily active in the 1980s, led by Richard Barone. With their unique musical style, they were major progenitors of the Hoboken indie-pop community, college radio favorites, and made the leap to national recognition with the advent of MTV. Their breakthrough song "Numbers with Wings" garnered the group a major cult following and was nominated at the first MTV Video Music Awards. Along with a handful of others, the Bongos were instrumental in the advancement of the alternative rock movement.

== History ==
The Bongos grew out of a band called "a", which had included the three original Bongos and Glenn Morrow, who later formed the Individuals and helped found Bar/None Records. "a" was the first band to play Maxwell's, a rock and roll club in Hoboken, when they opened for The Fleshtones.

The group was led by Richard Barone on vocals and guitar and included Rob Norris, formerly of the Zantees, on bass and Frank Giannini on drums. James Mastro, later of the Health & Happiness Show, joined the band as a guitarist after the release of their first LP. The group played extensively in Hoboken and New York City and toured the U.K. and Europe before touring in the U.S.

The Bongos emerged from Hoboken, N.J. in 1980. They quickly found favor at Manhattan's new wave and no wave venues such as Tier 3 and the Mudd Club, with a guitar-driven pop sound that included a strong influence of avant-garde and propulsive dance music. One of their early excursions as a trio was backing up violinist Helen Hooke of the legendary group the Deadly Nightshade (one of the first all-woman rock bands of the 1970s) at Gerde's Folk City. Hooke was instrumental in helping the band create their first demo recording. Soon, well-reviewed shows at Hurrah, Danceteria, and later The Ritz established them as particularly effective live performers. What set them apart from other such groups of the era were their sudden guitar outbursts or, on recordings, saxophone improvisations that echoed the work of Lou Reed, Ornette Coleman, or Captain Beefheart within the context of a pure, melodic pop song. In addition, unlike many of their peers, the group explored unabashedly sensual dance rhythms that made their recordings dance-floor favorites.

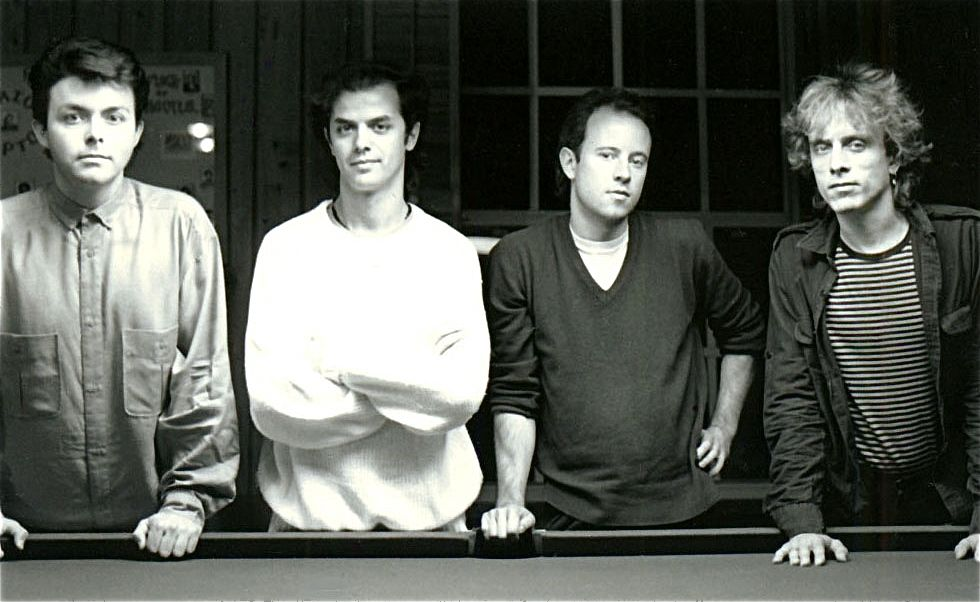
The Bongos at Compass Point Studios, Bahamas, during the recording of Phantom Train in 1985

They signed to British label Fetish Records, whose artist roster consisted of largely early industrial, experimental, and post-punk groups. While in London performing at The Rainbow Theatre, Dingwall's, and trendy Cabaret Futura, the Bongos recorded their early singles and their well-received debut EP Time and the River for Fetish. Cover designs for these releases were created by influential graphic artist Neville Brody, who was soon to become the designer of The Face magazine. The group's interest in avant-garde music brought them in touch with artists such as Throbbing Gristle and Clock DVA who performed with them live in London, and on their recordings. Their debut U.S. album, Drums Along the Hudson, compiled from the band's British singles, was released in 1982 to widely favorable reviews on both sides of the Atlantic. While Trouser Press suggested that the group "may trade a certain amount of substance for easy appeal," it added that "there's no better musical equivalent of whipped cream anywhere." Writing in the Village Voice, Robert Christgau dryly commented that "for all their jumpy originality [the songs are] still slight, and Richard Barone's lyrics are so oblique you have to wonder what his angle is." In 2007 however, Jim DeRegotis wrote in the Chicago Sun-Times: "The initial impression of naiveté is offset by deceptively simple lyrics that actually hint at deep, dark mysteries and unfathomed mystical enigmas." In 1981, the group's cover of T. Rex's "Mambo Sun", written by Marc Bolan, reached No. 22 on the Billboard Dance Club Chart. The thriving Hoboken pop scene, triggered by the Bongos and Maxwell's, gained national media attention, and drew many bands and fans to the city. An August 1, 1982 article in the New York Times Real Estate section hinted at the scene's popularity as an influence on increasing rents and property values.

After touring domestically in support of Drums Along the Hudson, including thirty concerts with The B-52s, Barone and Mastro retreated to Mitch Easter's "Drive-In Studios" in Winston-Salem, N.C. to record their own, duo album entitled Nuts & Bolts. Co-produced by Easter, the album exhibited a more acoustic sound, and each side showcased the songs and lead vocals of either Barone or Mastro.

In 1983, the group was signed to RCA Records, which subsequently released the mini-album, Numbers With Wings. New York Times' critic Robert Palmer — himself a former Hoboken-based musician with the Insect Trust — marked this as the beginning of the Bongos' creative decline, lamenting the "slick, overproduced records which vitiated the raw vitality the group had originally displayed." Regardless, the album spawned a popular and inventive MTV video of the title song (nominated for 'Best Direction' on the 1984 MTV Video Music Awards), and the song itself remained at the number one spot on the College Media Journal (CMJ) chart for six consecutive weeks. The album also included the tribal, dance-floor hit "Barbarella." A hectic tour schedule of over 300 shows a year sustained support at radio and MTV. Their Brazilian-influenced follow-up album, Beat Hotel, along with relentless touring, now with a further-expanded lineup including percussionist Steve Scales from Talking Heads, raised the Bongos' profile further and continued to increase their devoted cult following. But, the increased pressures proved difficult to maintain. It was in the midst of recording the Phantom Train album in Compass Point, Bahamas for Island Records that the band unofficially split up in 1987, with each member pursuing solo interests. The album was to remain unfinished and unreleased until 2013.

== Later work ==
Richard Barone has subsequently released a series of well-received solo albums, including Glow released on September 14, 2010, on Hoboken's Bar/None Records, a 3-disc CD/DVD live collection 'cool blue halo' 25th Anniversary Concert on the DigSin label in 2012, and Sorrows & Promises: Greenwich Village in the 1960s in late 2016. He tours regularly and has also established a career as a recording and concert producer. Since 2011, Barone has been a professor at NYU's Clive Davis Institute of Recorded Music and more recently at The New School of Jazz and Contemporary Music. He served on the Board of Governors for the Recording Academy/Grammys and serves on the advisory board of Anthology Film Archives. His memoir Frontman was published by Hal Leonard Books in 2007, and his second book Music & Revolution: Greenwich Village in the 1960s was published by Rowman & Littlefield in 2022. James Mastro owns a popular guitar shop in Hoboken ("The Guitar Bar") and tours regularly as guitarist for Ian Hunter and for the reformed Mott the Hoople. Bassist Rob Norris plays in numerous groups including some offshoots of the Feelies, while drummer Frank Giannini pursues other interests and continues drumming on various projects.

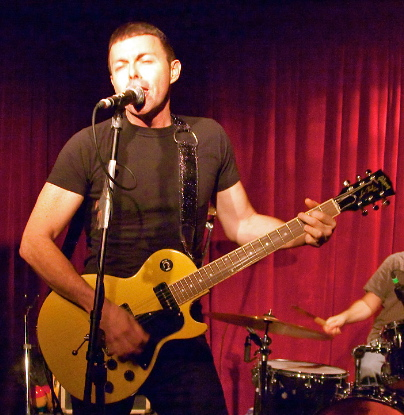
The Bongos appearing in 2009 at Maxwell's – the first time in two decades

In 2006, the original three Bongos re-entered the studio with longtime fan Moby producing to create bonus material for a CD reissue of the group's debut album. The remastered, 27-track special edition of Drums Along the Hudson, which was released internationally by Cooking Vinyl Records in June, 2007, includes rare, live bonus tracks and new studio recordings. An accompanying video for "Bulrushes 2007," a remake of the band's early single "The Bulrushes" featuring Moby seen mixing the track, was released simultaneously on iTunes.

The trio also reunited for two shows at Joe's Pub at The Public Theater in Greenwich Village in October 2006, and two more in February 2007. On September 30, 2007, the quartet played again in Hoboken for the first time in twenty years to an overflowing and appreciative crowd, and received a Proclamation from Mayor David Roberts commending them for their substantial contributions to Hoboken's culture and heritage. They headlined a day-long bill that featured the Chris Stamey Group, Glenn Mercer (formerly of the Feelies) and the Health and Happiness Show.

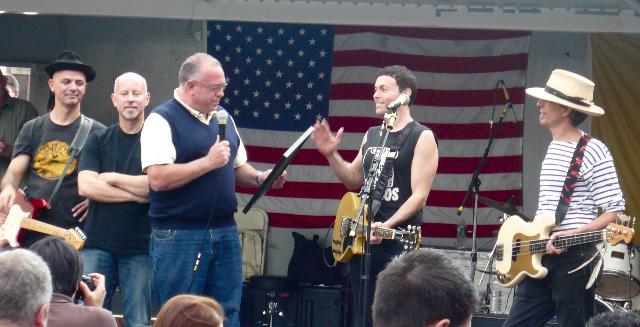
The Bongos receiving a proclamation from the City of Hoboken, September 30, 2007. From left: James Mastro, Frank Giannini, Mayor David Roberts, Richard Barone, and Rob Norris.

In Spring, 2008, Sony re-issued the Bongos RCA catalogue for the first time to iTunes/Apple Music, and all digital retailers.

On March 11, 2009, the Bongos performed a full concert set at The City Winery in NYC following a tribute to their longtime friends R.E.M. held at Carnegie Hall, a benefit for music education programs. R.E.M. Play Surprise Song at Tribute to Their Three-Decade Career On October 22, 2009, the group returned to their home club Maxwell's for the first time since 1986, and subsequently performed at Manhattan's Hiro Ballroom, during the CMJ Music Marathon 2009 that same month (with longtime friends the Fleshtones). On January 25, 2010, the Bongos reunited once again at the City Winery, this time to benefit Emergency Earthquake Relief efforts in Haiti. Various members have joined Richard Barone onstage for his solo performances.

Coming full circle, the Bongos came together again on July 31, 2013, to perform the final concert at Maxwell's, which was closing after its long run. The original members had also performed the venue's first show. With a crowd spilling into the Hoboken streets, Barone announced that the group's "lost" album Phantom Train would finally be released on October 1, 2013. The group also promised a series of reunion shows to celebrate its release.Jem Recordings – Home of Jem Records. Marty Scott, co-founder of Jem Records announced that Phantom Train would be the first release of the reconstituted label. The album was remixed and prepared for release in summer, 2013 by Richard Barone and Steve Addabbo. The original album cover graphics and photography, designed and hand-lettered by Emil Schult of Kraftwerk fame, were restored and used in the CD packaging.

On June 8, 2015, the Bongos once again came together, this time with drummer Dennis Diken of the Smithereens, to perform and act as "house band" at public radio station WFUV's "Fare Thee Well" concert for beloved radio legend Vin Scelsa at City Winery, who was retiring from radio. Besides renditions of their own songs, the group backed David Johansen, Marshall Crenshaw, Southside Johnny, Stephen Trask (composer of Hedwig and the Angry Inch), David Bromberg, and others in a three-hour concert that was broadcast on the station on July 4, 2015.Vin Scelsa, Fare Thee Well | WFUV

The group embarked on a mini-tour of the Northeast during October 2016 that paired them with West Coast power-pop band the Rubinoos.

In early 2020 it was announced that The Bongos would perform in several select cities including Atlanta, Philadelphia, and New York to "celebrate four decades Hoboken Pop". Due to the COVID-19 pandemic, the concerts were postponed until 2021.

In January 2021, The Bongos' made a new agreement with RCA Records to distribute their music via Sony Music's Legacy Recordings label. The first release under the new arrangement, Beat Hotel – Expanded Edition was released on the RCA label via Legacy Recordings on July 9, 2021. The collection was a remastered edition of the original album in high-definition with twelve previously unreleased bonus tracks.

For the fortieth anniversary of Numbers With Wings, RCA released expanded edition of their label debut E.P. with eight live bonus tracks, previously unreleased, which had been recorded in 1985. In October, 2023, RCA released "Rock The Christmas Cheer!", the Bongos first recording of a new song since 1986. On November 19, 2023, they performed in Music + Revolution: Greenwich Village in the 1960s at Carnegie Hall.

In April 2025, it was announced that a live album, The Shroud of Touring: Live in 1985 would be released on May 23, 2025, by Jem Records in a special arrangement with RCA Records and Sony Music. The CD was followed by the streaming release by RCA on September 19th.

== Discography ==
=== Studio albums ===
- Beat Hotel (1985, RCA Records) – produced by John Jansen
- Phantom Train (2013, Jem Records) – produced by Eric (E.T.) Thorngren, Chris Blackwell, the Bongos
- Beat Hotel – Expanded Edition (2021, RCA Records/Legacy Recordings)
- Numbers with Wings - 40th Anniversary Edition (2023, RCA Records/Legacy Recordings) – produced by Richard Gottehrer, the Bongos

=== Live Album ===
- The Shroud of Touring: Live in 1985 (2025, Jem Records/RCA Records/Sony Music) - produced by The Bongos and Steve Addabbo

=== Compilation albums ===
- Drums Along the Hudson (1982, PVC Records – the album features the first singles and the first EP) – produced by Ken Thomas, Mark Abel, the Bongos
- Start Swimming (1981, Stiff Records) ("Telephoto Lens" and "In the Congo" appear on this live recording from London's Rainbow theatre. The band, then still a trio, was joined on "In the Congo" by members of Bush Tetras and Throbbing Gristle)
- Drums Along the Hudson – Special Edition (2007, Cooking Vinyl; 2014, Jem Records)
- Songs appear on numerous 1980s punk and power pop compilations released on various labels.

=== Singles ===
- "Telephoto Lens" b/w "Glow in the Dark" (1980, Fetish Records)
- "In the Congo" b/w "Mambo Sun" (1980, Fetish Records)
- "The Bulrushes" b/w "Automatic Doors" (1981, Fetish Records)
- "Zebra Club" b/w "Certain Harbours" (1982, Fetish Records)
- "Mambo Sun" b/w "Hunting" (1982, Fetish Records)
- "Numbers with Wings" b/w "Skydiving" (1983, RCA Records, Sweden)
- "Numbers with Wings" (Remix) b/w "Barbarella" (Remix) – 12" single – (1983, RCA Records)
- "Barbarella" b/w tracks by One the Juggler and Blue Zoo – (1983, Trouser Press Flexi 7")
- "Brave New World (True Love Is Ordinary)" b/w "Totem Pole" (1985, RCA Records)
- "Brave New World (True Love Is Ordinary)" (Radio Edit) – 12" single – (1985, RCA Records)
- "Space Jungle" b/w "Apache Dancing" (1985, RCA Records, France)
- "Bulrushes 2007", The Bongos + Moby – CD single – (2007, Cooking Vinyl Records)
- "My Wildest Dreams" (2013, JEM Records, digital only)
- "Mambo Sun" (Remastered) (2020, Fetish Records, digital only)
- "Rock the Christmas Cheer!" (2023, RCA Records, Div. of Sony Music Entertainment. digital only)

=== 12" EPs ===
- In the Congo (1981, Fetish Records) – produced by Mark Abel, the Bongos
- Time and the River (1982, Fetish Records) – produced by Ken Thomas, the Bongos
- Numbers with Wings (1983, RCA Records) – produced by Richard Gottehrer

=== Miscellaneous ===
- Nuts and Bolts (1983, Passport Records), Richard Barone and James Mastro (duo album) – produced by Barone, Mastro, Mitch Easter

=== Music videos ===
- "In the Congo" – directed by Ed Steinberg
- "Mambo Sun" – directed by Ed Steinberg
- "The Bulrushes" – directed by Phil Marino
- "Numbers with Wings" – directed by Juliano Waldmann
- "Brave New World" – directed by Juliano Waldmann
- "Bulrushes 2007" (with Moby) – directed by Richard Kerris
