= WAWK =

- Kendallville, Indiana; United States
- Frequency: 1140 kHz
- Branding: 95.5 The Hawk

Programming
- Format: Classic hits
- Affiliations: Indianapolis Colts Radio Network

Ownership
- Owner: Northeast Indiana Broadcasting, Inc.

History
- First air date: 1955
- Former call signs: WKTL (1955–1957)

Technical information
- Licensing authority: FCC
- Facility ID: 49395
- Class: D
- Power: 250 watts day
- Transmitter coordinates: 41°27′16.18″N 85°15′47.91″W
- Translators: 94.3 W232DK (Auburn); 95.5 W238BH (Kendallville))

Links
- Public license information: Public file; LMS
- Webcast: Listen live
- Website: www.955fmthehawk.com

WAWK (1140 AM) is a radio station broadcasting a classic hits format. Licensed to Kendallville, Indiana, United States. The station is owned by Northeast Indiana Broadcasting. WAWK programming is simulcast on FM translators W232DK (94.3 MHz) in Auburn and W238BH (95.5 MHz) in Kendallville.

The station was first licensed December 29, 1955, as WKTL; the call sign was changed to WAWK on August 5, 1957.

== Translators ==
Call sign	Frequency	City of license	FID	ERP (W)	HAAT	Class	Transmitter coordinates	FCC info
W232DK	94.3 FM	Auburn, Indiana	200698	250	0 m (0 ft)	D	41°24′25.2″N 85°2′4.9″W	LMS
W238BH	95.5 FM	Kendallville, Indiana	156701	250	90.9 m (298 ft)	D	41°27′19.2″N 85°15′43.9″W	LMS
