= Jem Records =

- Founded: 1970
- Founder: Jeff Tenenbaum, Ed Grossi, Marty Scott
- Country of origin: United States
- Location: South Plainfield, New Jersey

Jem Records (also known as JEM Records) was a United States record label that originally existed from 1970 to 1988, at the time principally known as the parent company of Passport Records. The label was resurrected in 2013 as Jem Recordings.

== History ==
Jem Records, based in South Plainfield, New Jersey, was founded in 1970 by college friends Jeff Tenenbaum, Ed Grossi, and Marty Scott, also known as Martin L. Scott. Scott was attending Franklin and Marshall College, while Tenenbaum was attending Cornell University and Grossi was attending Wesleyan University. The label name is an acronym for the first letters of the first names of the three founders of the label.

The company was formed to sell imported records from Europe. The motivation for establishing the label was when co-founder Marty Scott discovered that he could only obtain the album Direct Hits, by The Who, by importing it from England. The co-founders also imported foreign releases of records by US artists and sold them at their respective colleges.

Jem's most successful deal was the licensing from Epic Records of the right to import Cheap Trick at Budokan, which at the time was only available in the United States as an import from Japan. As a result of this success, Epic Records delayed release of the next Cheap Trick studio album, Dream Police and released Budokan domestically, to great success. "I Want You to Want Me", from the album, became the band's breakout single. Another notable success was importing The Rocky Horror Picture Show soundtrack album. The record, released in 1975, had been deleted everywhere but in Canada. Marty Scott contracted with Lou Adler, whose label, Ode Records, had originally released the album, to distribute Canadian copies, under a production and distribution license in the US.

Jem Records also released in the United States the first albums by The Cure, Simple Minds, and Siouxsie and the Banshees. These were licensed from foreign labels. Jem Records was also the exclusive US distributor for such labels as WEA International, EG Records, and the Virgin International division of Virgin Records.

The company's principal record label was Passport Records, which it formed in 1973, in partnership with the Sire Records Group. Concurrently with the founding of Passport Records, the company established an alternate record distribution network, with warehouses on both the East and West coasts of the US. The Passport Records partnership was dissolved in 1977, when Sire Records was acquired by Warner Bros. Records. Jem operated Passport Records on its own, thereafter.

Jem Records went public in 1984, with its initial public offering meeting with mixed success, resulting in a reduction in the offering price. At the same time, the import and distribution activities of Jem Records were negatively affected by the loss of a copyright lawsuit brought by T.B. Harms Music. Prior to this judgement, Jem Records had not been paying royalties on imported records. Jem Records went from reported net income of approximately $391,000 on sales of approximately $14 million in 1984 to a loss of approximately $225,000 on sales of approximately $16 million in 1985.

In early 1987 Passport Records separated from Jem Records, to be led as a separate operation by Marty Scott. Tenenbaum and Grossi left soon afterwards. They sold their shares to John Matarazzo, who became chairman and chief executive officer, owning 40% of the equity. Also in 1987, Jem Records signed a letter of intent to sell its distribution and record operations to Enigma Records. In 1988, Enigma declined to complete the transaction. Jem Records subsequently went bankrupt, in 1988.

In 2013 Marty Scott resurrected the label, as Jem Recordings, with a focus on signing new artists and licensing older recordings for release under the label. The first release of the reconstituted label was announced as The Bongos' Phantom Train, recorded in 1986 and remixed in 2013 by Richard Barone.
