= WVVO =

Spanish-language urban radio station in Orlando, Florida

- Orlando, Florida; United States
- Broadcast area: Greater Orlando
- Frequency: 1140 kHz
- Branding: Viva FM

Programming
- Format: Spanish Salsa

Ownership
- Owner: Florida Broadcasters
- Sister stations: WLBE; WONQ

History
- First air date: 1985
- Former call signs: WONQ (1984–1992); WRMQ (1992–2018); WURF (2018–2019); WURB (2019–2021)
- Call sign meaning: W ViVa Orlando

Technical information
- Licensing authority: FCC
- Facility ID: 21759
- Class: D
- Power: 5,000 watts day 8 watts night
- Transmitter coordinates: 28°34′48″N 81°25′16″W
- Translators: 99.5 W258DD (Orlando) (103.7 MHz) W279CT (Kissimmee)

Links
- Public license information: Public file; LMS
- Webcast: Listen Live
- Website: vivafmorlando.com

WVVO (1140 AM) is a radio station broadcasting a Salsa Music format. It is licensed to Orlando, Florida, and is owned by Florida Broadcasters. It addition to its AM signal, WVVO is heard on two FM translators in the Greater Orlando area: 99.5 W258DD in Orlando and 103.7 W279CT in Kissimmee.

WVVO was originally licensed as a "daytime only" station. AM 1140 is a clear channel frequency reserved for Class A WRVA in Richmond, Virginia, and WVVO had to sign off at sunset to avoid interference. Now, WVVO broadcasts at night with an FCC approved power of only 8 watts. By day, WVVO is powered at 5,000 watts.

On December 15, 2017, the station flipped from its gospel programming to a reggaetón format. On January 3, 2018, it changed its call sign from WRMQ to WURF, then to WURB on June 19, 2019, and as of December 31, 2021, carries the callsign WVVO. It has since flipped to the salsa format previously carried by sister station WONQ. The reggaetón format moved back to WURB-LP.

Logo as Urbana FM
