= WAMA (AM) =

Regional Mexican radio station in Tampa, Florida

Coordinates: 27°55′05″N 82°23′41″W

- Tampa, Florida; United States
- Broadcast area: Tampa Bay
- Frequency: 1550 kHz
- Branding: La Ley 107.7FM Y 1550AM

Programming
- Format: Regional Mexican

Ownership
- Owner: George and Esperanza Arroyo; (Q Broadcasting Corporation)
- Sister stations: WLBE, WTIS

History
- First air date: 1961
- Former call signs: WYOU (1961–1986)
- Call sign meaning: AMA = "Love" in Spanish

Technical information
- Licensing authority: FCC
- Facility ID: 19055
- Class: D
- Power: 10,000 watts day 133 watts night
- Translator: 107.7 W299CI (Tampa)
- Repeater: 790 WLBE (Leesburg-Eustis)

Links
- Public license information: Public file; LMS
- Webcast: Listen live
- Website: laleyradio.com

WAMA (1550 kHz) is an AM radio station broadcasting a Regional Mexican format. Licensed to Tampa, Florida, United States, it serves the Tampa Bay area. The station is currently owned by George and Esperanza Arroyo, through licensee Q Broadcasting Corporation.

The station broadcasts 24 hours a day with a non-directional antenna, but at a lower power at night.

== Programming ==
Until April 2013, most programming on WAMA was provided by ESPN Deportes Radio. The station does air one local program, Momento Deportivo ESPN 1550, hosted by Victor Rodriguez.

== Previous logo ==
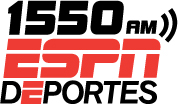
