= WTXW =

Coordinates: 41°45′55″N 76°29′10″W

- Towanda, Pennsylvania; United States
- Broadcast area: Northern Pennsylvania
- Frequency: 1550 kHz
- Branding: Valley 107.7

Programming
- Format: Adult top 40
- Affiliations: Compass Media Networks

Ownership
- Owner: Dave Radigan; (Radigan Broadcasting Group, LLC)
- Sister stations: WTTC-FM

History
- First air date: August 7, 1960
- Former call signs: WTTC (1960–2022)

Technical information
- Licensing authority: FCC
- Facility ID: 68613
- Class: D
- Power: 500 watts day 4 watts night
- Translator: 107.7 W299CM (Towanda)

Links
- Public license information: Public file; LMS
- Webcast: Listen Live
- Website: Valley 107.7

WTXW (1550 AM, "Valley 107.7") is a commercial radio station in Towanda, Pennsylvania. It broadcasts an Adult Top 40 radio format and is owned by the Radigan Broadcasting Group, LLC.

By day, WTXW broadcasts at 500 watts non-directional. But 1550 AM is a clear channel frequency reserved for Class A station CBEF in Windsor, Ontario. So at night, to avoid interference, WTXW must greatly reduce power to 4 watts. Programming is also heard on 250-watt FM translator W299CM at 107.7 MHz in Athens, Pennsylvania.

== History ==
The station first signed on the air on August 7, 1960. For most of its history, its call sign was WTTC. It was a daytimer, required to go off the air at sunset. The previous year, the same owners put an FM station on the air, WTTC-FM 95.3 MHz. In their early years, the two stations simulcast a full service radio format, at times playing middle of the road (MOR) music and country music. The two later separated their programming and today WTTC-FM is a classic hits station.

WTTC AM 1550 was previously simulcast with WTZN 1310 AM in Troy, Pennsylvania. Both stations aired Westwood One's Good Time Oldies format.

On April 18, 2022, WTTC dropped its simulcast with WTZN and launched an Adult Top 40 format. It changed its call sign to WTXW on June 16, 2022. Coupled with its FM translator at 107.7 MHz, it uses the branding "Valley 107.7."
