= Drums Along the Hudson =

Studio album by The Bongos
- Released: 1982
- Recorded: October 1979, November 1980, March 1981
- Genre: Power pop
- Label: PVC
- Producer: Ken Thomas, Mark Abel, The Bongos

Drums Along the Hudson is the debut album by American power pop band The Bongos, released in 1982 by record label PVC.

== Reception ==
Professional ratings
Review scores
Source	Rating
AllMusic	4.5/5 stars
Christgau's Record Guide	B+
Time Out	favourable
Trouser Press	mixed

Time Out called the album "one of the best albums to come out of the NYC area during the fertile, shadowy period between punk and new wave". AllMusic called it "a minor masterpiece".

== Re-issues ==
The album has been reissued numerous times on several labels including Line Records (Germany), Razor & Tie, and Jem Records. The 2007 Special Edition re-issue on Cooking Vinyl Records contains 12 bonus tracks, including a remake of "The Bulrushes" produced by and featuring Moby.

== Track listing ==
1. "In the Congo"
2. "The Bulrushes"
3. "Clay Midgets"
4. "Video Eyes"
5. "Glow in the Dark"
6. "Telephoto Lens"
7. "Certain Harbours"
8. "Speaking Sands"
9. "Burning Bush"
10. "Automatic Doors"
11. "Hunting"
12. "Zebra Club"
13. "Three Wise Men"
14. "Mambo Sun" (Marc Bolan)
15. "Question Ball"
