= WKTF =

- Vienna, Georgia; United States
- Frequency: 1550 kHz

Programming
- Format: Variety

Ownership
- Owner: Hammett Financial Management Corporation

Technical information
- Licensing authority: FCC
- Facility ID: 17306
- Class: D
- Power: 10,000 watts day 23 watts night
- Transmitter coordinates: 32°7′47.00″N 83°47′43.00″W
- Translator: 99.3 W257EN (Cordele)

Links
- Public license information: Public file; LMS
- Website: wktfan1550.com

WKTF (1550 AM) is a radio station broadcasting a Variety format. It is licensed to Vienna, Georgia, United States. The station is currently owned by Hammett Financial Management Corporation.

After several extended periods of silence over the years, Hammett Financial Management took over operation of WKTF on June 1, 2019, under a time brokerage agreement, pending consummation of the purchase of the station from Len Radio.
