= DigSin =

Free music distribution

DigSin is a new-model record label based in Nashville, Tennessee. DigSin was founded in 2011 by author and music industry executive Jay Frank and is modeled on the idea of distributing free music to those who subscribe to the label. Short for digital single, DigSin releases singles rather than albums. DigSin uses various forms of mass media to maximize the fan base.

DigSin's roster includes NNXT, Connie Lim, Bronze Radio Return, Like Swimming, Paradise Fears, Stargroves, Richard Barone, and Lauren Shera, whose singles include Lim's "LA City", NNXT's "DRNK TXTNG", and Bronze Radio Return's "Wonder No More". Since its creation, DigSin has been featured in Time, Rolling Stone, Hypebot, and Billboard. DigSin also presented a showcase at South by Southwest in Austin, Texas, in March 2012, presenting itself as a new way for labels to manage and distribute music in the music industry.
