= John Matarazzo =

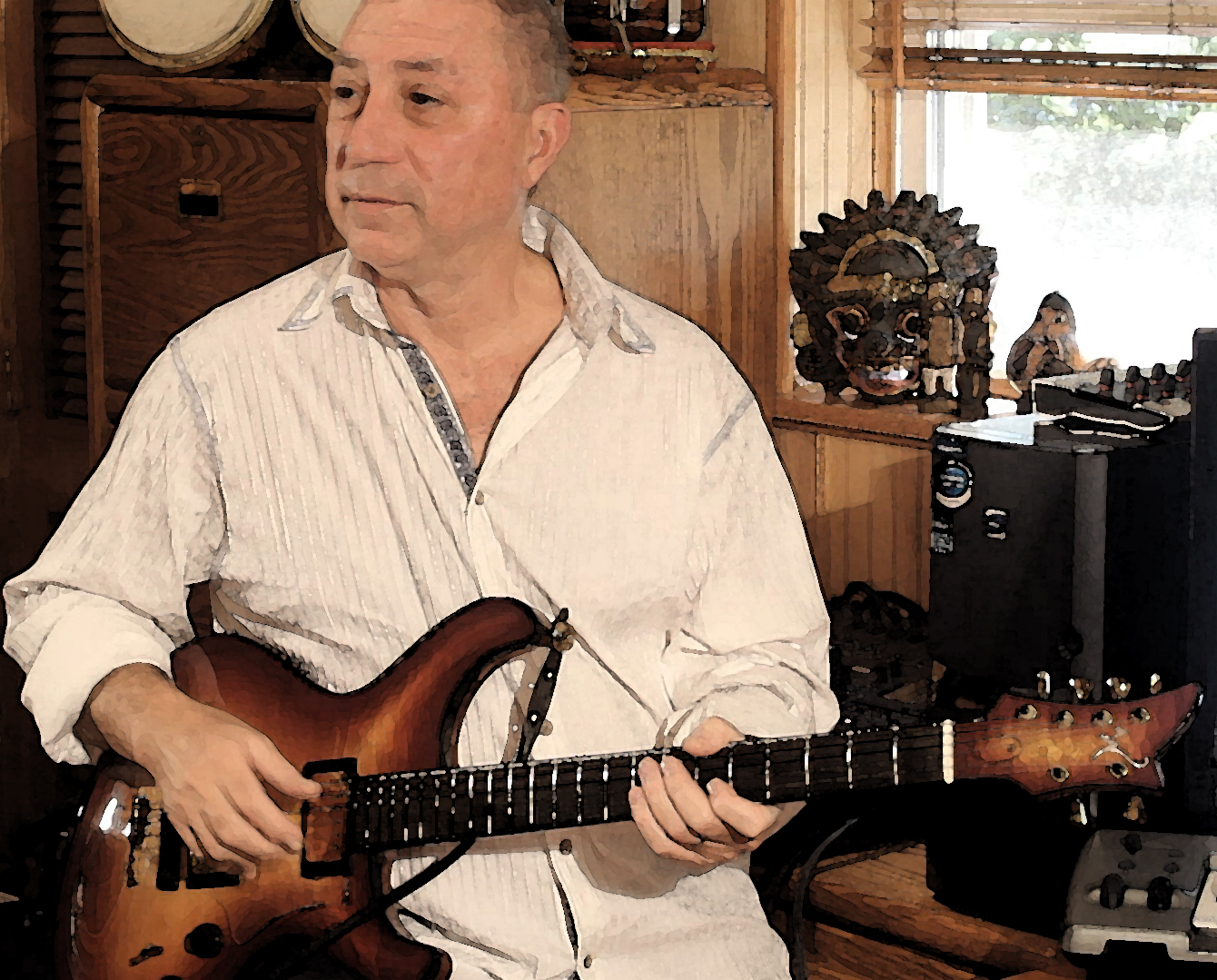
- Occupations: Musician, composer, producer
- Notable work: Logical Drift

John Matarazzo is an American musician, composer, producer and performer. He has worked with artists including Bill Laswell, Blood Sweat & Tears, Bob Dylan, Ike & Tina Turner, Sly & The Family Stone, Ravi Shankar, Herbie Hancock, Daniela Mercury and Buckethead. In 2010, he established the experimental electronic music project Logical Drift.

== Career ==
Matarazzo began his career as an audio editing software representative for CBS Discos International. In the 1980s, he was the president and sales manager of Intercon Music Co., an independent distributor that worked with smaller classical music labels as well as CBS Special Products, Denon Records, RCA and Rhino Records. In 1987, Matarazzo was made chairman CEO of Jem Records.

In 1990, Matarazzo received rights to all Celluloid Records master recordings. In 1991 he was indicted by a New Jersey grand jury on various counts including conspiracy and misconduct involving Celluloid, but was never convicted. Matarazzo then co-founded independent record label Subharmonic with Bill Laswell and Robert Soares in 1993. He worked on various albums released by Subharmonic and its sub-label Strata Records including Buckethead's Dreamatorium (released under the anagram name Death Cube K). During this time, he co-founded Sooj Records with Jeff Gordon and Path Soong. The independent label released works from artists who also created visual art along with their recordings. Subharmonic ended activity in the mid-nineties after Matarazzo left the label.

In addition to his work as a music producer, Matarazzo has realized various live performances into video and digital format. He is credited in the production or realization of live performances from artists including Michael Jackson, The Supremes, Luther Vandross, Donna Summer, Lynyrd Skynyrd, Al Green, Anita Baker, Daddy Yankee, Héctor Lavoe, Whitney Houston, Gladys Knight, Marc Anthony, The Temptations, B.B. King, Black Sabbath, Nusrat Fateh Ali Khan, Prince, Barry White, Rubén Blades, Hall & Oates, Ike & Tina Turner, Herbie Hancock, Ray Charles and Rod Stewart.

== Logical Drift ==
In 2010, he partnered with producer and sound engineer Logan Strand to form the band Logical Drift. Drawing influence from ambient, electronic and world music, Logical Drift produces experimental tracks with psychological compositions and electronic music elements inspired by the works of Karlheinz Stockhausen and Pierre Boulez. In 2013, Logical Drift released the mobile app Zen Den. The app is promoted as a music player that helps the user concentrate while meditating or practicing yoga.

=== Discography ===
| Year | Album |
|---|---|
| 2014 | The Americas, Book of Love - Vol. 1 |
| 2012 | The Colors of Asia |
| 2011 | Rain Queen of the Negev |
| 2011 | Logical Drift |
