= KWRN =

- Apple Valley, California; United States
- Broadcast area: Victorville, California
- Frequency: 1550 kHz
- Branding: Radio Lazer 99.5 y 1550

Programming
- Format: Regional Mexican

Ownership
- Owner: Lazer Media; (Lazer Licenses, LLC)

History
- First air date: 1989
- Former call signs: KITH (1989–1991); KAPL (1991–1994)

Technical information
- Licensing authority: FCC
- Facility ID: 33393
- Class: B
- Power: 5,000 watts (day); 500 watts (night)
- Transmitter coordinates: 34°32′12″N 117°9′25.1″W
- Translator: 99.5 K258DE (Apple Valley)

Links
- Public license information: Public file; LMS
- Webcast: Listen live
- Website: www.radiolazer.com/victor-valley

KWRN (1550 AM) is a commercial radio station licensed to Apple Valley, California, United States, and serving the Victor Valley area. Owned by Lazer Media, it carries a regional Mexican format branded as "Radio Lazer 99.5 y 1550".

KWRN is also heard over low-power FM translator K258DE at 99.5 MHz.

== History ==
In 1989, a construction permit was granted by the Federal Communications Commission for a new AM station in Apple Valley at 1550 kHz. The construction permit had the call sign KITH. The station signed on the air in 1991. By the time that happened, it had the call letters KAPL. The call sign changed to KWRN in 1994, coinciding with Major Market Broadcasting's acquisition of the station.

Former branding prior to the sale to Radio Lazer

In November 2016, translator 94.3 K232EW in Ventura was purchased from Southern California Public Radio for $40,000. On November 15, 2016, the Federal Communications Commission granted a construction permit to move K232EW from Ventura to Apple Valley and change the frequency to 99.5 MHz with an accompanying change of call letters to K258DE.
