= WOCC =

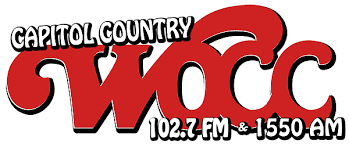
- Corydon, Indiana; United States
- Broadcast area: Louisville, Kentucky
- Frequency: 1550 kHz
- Branding: WOCC 102.7FM & 1550AM

Programming
- Format: Classic country

Ownership
- Owner: Dawn Fowler and Tim Jackson; (Two Hawks Communications LLC)

History
- First air date: 1964
- Former call signs: WJDW (1979–1989); WGZB (1989–1991)

Technical information
- Licensing authority: FCC
- Facility ID: 54550
- Class: D
- Power: 250 watts (day); 6 watts (night)
- Transmitter coordinates: 38°11′26.00″N 86°8′0.00″W
- Translator: 102.7 W274AD (Corydon)

Links
- Public license information: Public file; LMS
- Webcast: Listen live
- Website: www.wocc1027.com

WOCC (1550 AM) is a radio station broadcasting a classic country music format. Licensed to Corydon, Indiana, United States, the station serves the Louisville, Kentucky, area. The station is currently owned by Dawn Fowler and Tim Jackson, through licensee Two Hawks Communications LLC. Its former owner was Richard Lee Brabandt.

== History ==
The station went on the air in 1964 as call sign WPDF, and was owned by Harrison Radio, Inc. The station was assigned the call sign WJDW on September 29, 1979. WJDW obtained an FM license at 96.5 FM. On October 20, 1989, WJDW sold the FM and its FM call sign was changed to WGZB; On February 4, 1991, WJDW changed its AM call sign to the current WOCC.

== Translator ==
In 2013, WOCC gained an FM translator on 102.7 MHz with the call sign W274AD.

Broadcast translator for WOCC
Call sign	Frequency	City of license	FID	ERP (W)	HAAT	Class	Transmitter coordinates	FCC info
W274AD	102.7 FM	Corydon, Indiana	81220	230	36 m (118 ft)	D	38°11′29″N 86°7′59″W	LMS
