= WBXR =

- Hazel Green, Alabama; United States
- Broadcast area: Huntsville - Athens - Decatur
- Frequency: 1140 kHz
- Branding: The Anchor 101.3

Programming
- Format: Christian talk and teaching

Ownership
- Owner: Wilkins Communications Network, Inc.; (New England Communications, Inc.)

History
- First air date: December 11, 1970
- Former call signs: WIXC (1970–1984); WKZF (1984–1985); WIXC (1985–1991)

Technical information
- Licensing authority: FCC
- Facility ID: 8999
- Class: D
- Power: 15,000 watts daytime only; 7,500 watts critical hours
- Transmitter coordinates: 34°57′11.3″N 86°38′42″W

Links
- Public license information: Public file; LMS
- Website: www.wilkinsradio.com/our-stations/wbxr-1140am-101-3fm-huntsville-al

WBXR (1140 AM) is a daytimer radio station licensed to Hazel Green, Alabama, that serves the Huntsville - Athens - Decatur radio market. WBXR is owned by the Wilkins Communications Network based in Spartanburg, South Carolina. The license held by New England Communications, Inc. WBXR airs a Christian talk and teaching radio format.

By day, WBXR is powered at 15,000 watts non-directional (7,500 watts during critical hours). AM 1140 is a clear-channel frequency, on which WRVA in Richmond, Virginia, and XEMR in Monterrey- Apodaca, Mexico, are the dominant Class A stations. As such, WBXR must leave the air during nighttime hours to avoid interference and protect their nighttime skywave signals. WBXR programming is available around the clock on 250-watt FM translator W267CG at 101.3 MHz in Hazel Green.

Call sign	Frequency	City of license	FID	ERP (W)	Class	FCC info
W267CG	101.3 FM	Hazel Green, Alabama	144380	250	D	LMS

== Programming ==
The bulk of WBXR programming comes from the Wilkins Communications Network.

Notable weekend programming includes the Sure Word Ministries radio program on Saturday mornings and Willingheart Radio on Saturday afternoons.

== History ==
The station signed on the air on December 11, 1970. Its call sign was WIXC from December 1970 through May 1991, except for 11 months between 1984 and 1985 when the station was briefly known as WKZF. "WIXC (pronounced wicks-see) in Dixie" ran country and oldies formats at varying points over 20 years. The station was originally licensed to Fayetteville, Tennessee, across the state line from Hazel Green.

In January 1991, WIXC's then-owners, Lincoln County Broadcasters, Inc., reached an agreement to sell the station to Low Country Corporation, Inc. The deal was approved by the Federal Communications Commission on March 12, 1991, and the transaction was consummated on March 22, 1991. On May 15, 1991, the new owners had the FCC change the station's callsign from WIXC to WBXR.

In July 1997, Low Country Corporation reached an agreement to sell WBXR to New England Communications, Inc. The deal was approved by the FCC on September 2, 1997, and the transaction was consummated on September 16, 1997.

In 2016, Wilkins Radio started broadcasting on an FM signal, (W267GC) 101.3, in Huntsville, Alabama. The programming on FM 101.3 is a simulcast of WBXR AM 1140. The format continues with Urban Gospel music, preaching and talk shows.
