= WIGN =

- Bristol, Tennessee; United States
- Broadcast area: Tri-Cites - Johnson City -Kingsport - Bristol
- Frequency: 1550 kHz
- Branding: WIGN 1550 AM & 92.1 FM

Programming
- Format: Bluegrass Music, Southern Gospel and Christian talk and teaching

Ownership
- Owner: Mountain Music Ministries, LLC

History
- First air date: August 16, 1962

Technical information
- Licensing authority: FCC
- Facility ID: 63979
- Class: D
- Power: 35,000 watts (day); 6 watts (night)
- Transmitter coordinates: 36°33′57.4″N 82°09′26.5″W
- Translator: 92.1 W221EC (Bristol)

Links
- Public license information: Public file; LMS
- Website: 1550ambluegrass.com

WIGN (1550 AM) is a commercial radio station licensed to Bristol, Tennessee, United States, and serving the Tri-Cites area of Tennessee and Virginia. Owned by Mountain Music Ministries, LLC, the station broadcasts a format of Bluegrass Music, Southern Gospel Music and Christian talk and teaching.

By day, WIGN is powered at 35,000 watts non-directional. But 1550 AM is a Canadian and Mexican clear-channel frequency. So to reduce interference, WIGN must greatly reduce nighttime power to 6 watts. WIGN also broadcasts on a 250 watt FM translator, 92.1 MHz W221EC.

== History ==
On August 16, 1962, the station first signed on the air. It was originally a daytimer, required to go off the air at sunset. It later received low-power nighttime authorization. For much of its history, it has broadcast a mix of Classic Country, Southern Gospel and Bluegrass music.
