= WTTC-FM =

- Towanda, Pennsylvania; United States
- Broadcast area: Bradford County, Pennsylvania
- Frequency: 95.3 MHz
- Branding: 95.3 The Bridge

Programming
- Format: Classic rock

Ownership
- Owner: Radigan Media (Dave & Irene Radigan); (Radigan Broadcasting Group, LLC)
- Sister stations: WTXW

History
- First air date: November 1959

Technical information
- Licensing authority: FCC
- Facility ID: 68614
- Class: A
- ERP: 5,400 watts
- HAAT: 38 meters (125 ft)
- Transmitter coordinates: 41°45′55″N 76°29′10″W

Links
- Public license information: Public file; LMS
- Website: WTTC-FM Online

WTTC-FM (95.3 FM) is a commercial radio station licensed to Towanda, Pennsylvania, United States, serving Bradford County. WTTC-FM's license is held by Radigan Media (owned by Dave and Irene Radigan). It is known as "95.3 The Bridge" and plays a classic rock radio format.

WTTC-FM's transmitter is sited on Old Plank Road in Towanda.

== History ==
WTTC-FM first signed on the air in November 1959. The following year, the same owners put an AM station on the air, WTTC 1550 AM (now WTXW). In their early years, the two stations simulcast a full service radio format, at times playing middle of the road (MOR) music and country music. Both were network affiliates of the Mutual Broadcasting System. The two later separated their programming and today WTXW is an Adult Top 40 station.

Previously owned by Cantroair Communications, WTTC-AM-FM were sold on March 24, 2022, to Radigan Media (owned by Dave and Irene Radigan). While owned by Cantroair WTTC-FM's sister stations were WHGL 100.3 and 102.9 FM (Wiggle 100), WTZN 1310 AM and WTTC 1550 AM "The Zone." WTTC and its translator W299CM were also sold to Radigan Media in March 2022.

On March 30, 2022, WTTC-FM changed its format from classic hits to classic rock.
