= KLTK =

- Centerton, Arkansas; United States
- Broadcast area: Northwest Arkansas
- Frequency: 1140 kHz

Programming
- Format: Regional Mexican

Ownership
- Owner: Edward Vega; (La Zeta 957 Inc)

Technical information
- Licensing authority: FCC
- Facility ID: 33073
- Class: D
- Power: 5,000 watts days only
- Transmitter coordinates: 36°21′50″N 94°20′53″W
- Translator: 99.9 K260CS (Rogers)

Links
- Public license information: Public file; LMS

KLTK (99.9FM/1140 AM) is a radio station broadcasting a Latin Urban radio format . Licensed to Rogers and Centerton, Arkansas, United States, it serves the Fayetteville - Springdale - Rogers Northwest Arkansas area. The station is currently owned by Edward Vega, through licensee La Zeta 957 Inc.

Programming is also heard on FM translator 99.9 K260CS in Rogers, Arkansas.
