= WELP =

Coordinates: 34°50′22.4″N 82°38′19.5″W

- Easley, South Carolina; United States
- Broadcast area: Upstate South Carolina
- Frequency: 1360 kHz
- Branding: The Truth 1360; The Truth 104.3

Programming
- Format: Religious

Ownership
- Owner: Wilkins Radio; (Upstate Radio, Inc.)

History
- First air date: March 4, 1951
- Former call signs: WELP (March 4, 1951-December 20, 1992); WLWZ (December 20, 1992- February 5, 1995); WRAH (February 5, 1995-July 18, 1997)
- Call sign meaning: "E"asley, "L"iberty, & "P"ickens (nearby towns)

Technical information
- Licensing authority: FCC
- Facility ID: 27423
- Class: D
- Power: 5,000 watts day 36 watts night
- Translator: 104.3 W282CL (Easley)

Links
- Public license information: Public file; LMS
- Webcast: WELP 1360 Listen Live; WELP 104.3 Listen Live
- Website: WELP 1360 Online; WELP 104.3 Online

WELP (1360 AM) is a religious radio station located in Easley, South Carolina. The station is licensed by the Federal Communications Commission (FCC) to broadcast with 5,000 watts of power during the day and 36 watts at night.
