= WJJS =

WJJS may refer to:

- WJJS (FM), a radio station (93.5 FM) licensed to Salem, Virginia, United States
- WSTV (FM), a radio station (104.9 FM) licensed to Roanoke, Virginia, which held the call sign WJJS from 2007 to 2019
- WLRX (FM), a radio station (106.1 FM) licensed to Vinton, Virginia, which held the call signs WJJS and WJJS-FM from 1994 to 2007
- WVGM, a radio station (1320 AM) licensed to Lynchburg, Virginia, which held the call sign WJJS from 1986 to 1992 and 1996 to 1998
- WAWX, a radio station (101.7 FM) licensed to Lynchburg, Virginia, which held the call sign WJJS from 1992 to 1994
