= Marlette Community Schools =

School district in Michigan

Address
- 6230 Euclid Street Marlette, Sanilac County, Michigan, 48453; United States

District information
- Motto: Inspiring an Educational Journey.
- Grades: PreKindergarten–12
- Superintendent: James Marshall
- Schools: 2
- Budget: $12,411,000 2022–2023 expenditures
- NCES District ID: 2622860

Students and staff
- Students: 699 (2024–2025)
- Teachers: 39 (on an FTE basis) (2024–2025)
- Staff: 81.91 FTE (2024–2025)
- Student–teacher ratio: 17.92 (2024–2025)
- District mascot: Red Raiders

Other information
- Website: www.marletteschools.org

Marlette Community Schools is a public school district in the Thumb region of Michigan. In Sanilac County, it serves Marlette, Marlette Township, and parts of the townships of Elmer, Flynn, and Lamotte., In Lapeer County, it serves Clifford and parts of the townships of Burlington and Burnside. It also serves parts of Kingston Township and Koylton Township in Tuscola County.

== History ==
A new school was built in Marlette in 1895, at the location of the current junior/senior high school. With the consolidation of Marlette's school district and outlying school districts around 1935, a new building section was planned as an addition to it. The Works Progress Administration contributed to the building's cost. On September 26, 1936, a construction worker died from an accident while building the school. The building was completed in 1937.

Bea McDonald Elementary opened in fall 1955 and closed at the end of the 2007–2008 school year.

In 1974, a new junior high school was under construction. As of the 2008–2009 school year, grades K-6 were housed at the middle school site at 6230 Euclid, and the high school housed grades 7–12. Currently, sixth graders attend the junior/senior high school.

== Schools ==
Schools in Marlette Community Schools district
School	Address	Notes
Marlette Junior/Senior High School	3051 Moore St., Marlette	Grades 7–12
Marlette Elementary	6230 Euclid, Marlette	Grades PreK-6
