= WAWX =

- Lynchburg, Virginia; United States
- Broadcast area: Lynchburg metropolitan area
- Frequency: 101.7 MHz

Programming
- Format: Contemporary worship music
- Network: Air1

Ownership
- Owner: Educational Media Foundation
- Sister stations: WLRX

History
- First air date: August 1, 1964
- Former call signs: WDMS-FM (1964–1968); WJJS-FM (1968–1986); WXYU (1986–1992); WJJS (1992–1994); WJJX (1994–2007); WSNZ (2007–2019)

Technical information
- Licensing authority: FCC
- Facility ID: 70331
- Class: A
- ERP: 6,000 watts
- HAAT: 65 meters (213 ft)
- Transmitter coordinates: 37°27′44″N 79°8′31″W

Links
- Public license information: Public file; LMS
- Webcast: Listen live
- Website: air1.com

WAWX (101.7 FM) is a radio station in Lynchburg, Virginia, United States. It transmits Air1, a national contemporary worship music network, to the Lynchburg area and is owned by the Educational Media Foundation.

This station began broadcasting as WDMS-FM, the FM counterpart to WDMS (1320 AM), on August 1, 1964. It became WJJS-FM in 1968 and, from then until 1986, broadcast an urban contemporary format. From 1986 to 1991, the WJJS format and call sign were moved to AM; on the FM, then known as WXYU, ownership programmed other formats—first contemporary hit radio and later country music—to increase revenue. WJJS moved back to FM in 1992 and two years later began being broadcast on 106.1 MHz at Vinton, Virginia, to reach the Roanoke area. The WJJS call sign moved to Vinton, and this station became WJJX.

The simulcast of WJJS and WJJX was broken up between 2007 and 2011, at a time when then-owner Clear Channel Communications was forced to put some of its stations in a divestiture trust. It was later restored as "Steve FM", an adult hits station programmed by Clear Channel, later known as iHeartMedia. This station was known as WSNZ between 2007 and 2019. In 2019, the two stations were sold out of the trust to the Educational Media Foundation and integrated into its national Christian music networks.

== History ==
=== Early years ===
Southeastern Broadcasting Corporation, owner of Lynchburg, Virginia, radio station WDMS (1320 AM), applied to the Federal Communications Commission (FCC) on September 6, 1963, for permission to build a new FM radio station in Lynchburg. The commission granted a construction permit on April 1, 1964, and WDMS-FM began broadcasting that August 1. It simulcast the AM station during the day and aired programs at night when the AM was off the air. The WDMS stations were acquired by the Rulon Maynard Corporation in November 1965 from Southeastern and the original owner, D. M. "Danny" Shaver. The FM station's call sign was changed to WJJS-FM on June 15, 1968.

In 1979, Neighborhood Communications Corporation acquired WJJS-FM. By 1981, it was the most-listened-to radio station in the Lynchburg area,

CRS Communications acquired WJJS-FM and the AM station, then known as WHRQ, in November 1985. In late March 1986, WJJS flipped from its urban contemporary format to contemporary hit radio as WXYU "U-102", geared toward White listeners. The WJJS programming and call sign moved to the AM band, with management citing the low advertising revenue WJJS was pulling in for an FM station, but some Black leaders felt that the move was a slight to their audience. By 1987, WXYU was placing seventh in the local market. At the start of 1988, three disc jockeys and the entire sales department from competing and higher-rated contemporary hits station WKZZ moved to U-102. With so much competition in the format but far less for country listeners in a market dominated by WYYD, WXYU flipped to country on July 24, 1989. WYYD remained near the top of the total market, while WXYU was at the bottom with half as many listeners as WJJS in Roanoke–Lynchburg by the fall 1991 Arbitron survey.

The WJJS urban format moved back to FM on January 1, 1992, with WXYU's country moving to AM as the only station with that format in that band. That year, a new urban radio station went on the air to compete with WJJS. Known as V103 or V-Jams and consisting of WVLR (102.7 FM) in the Lynchburg area and WVRV (105.3 FM) in Roanoke, it reached a larger area than WJJS. In response, WJJS ceased simulcasting Virginia Cavaliers sports with WXYU.

David Weil, owner of Roanoke's WROV AM and WROV-FM, announced the purchase of WJJS and WYXU in 1993. He declared WJJS would keep its format, but the transaction never proceeded due to Weil filing personal bankruptcy. Instead, the stations were acquired by Bruce Houston of Vienna, Virginia, and his company Virginia Network. The company also owned the V-Jams stations but opted to retain WJJS's format as the heritage urban station in the market and change the V-Jams stations to oldies.

=== Simulcast with 106.1 ===
To bring WJJS into Roanoke, Virginia Network leased WWFO (106.1 FM) at Vinton, a new station owned by Michael Scott Copeland. The two stations broadcast as "Jammin' 106 and Jammin' 101.7". The 101.7 frequency changed call signs to WJJX.

Cavalier Communications bought the Virginia Network cluster in 1996. The pair were the second-most-listened-to station in the Roanoke–Lynchburg market when Capstar Broadcasting Partners acquired the Cavalier cluster in 1997. Capstar merged with Chancellor Broadcasting to form AMFM in 1998, and Clear Channel Communications acquired AMFM in 1999.

Between 2007 and 2011, Clear Channel broke up the pairing of 106.1 and 101.7. In December 2007, it moved the WJJS format to 104.9 MHz in Roanoke and 102.7 MHz in Lynchburg. The 101.7 frequency was paired with 93.5 MHz in Roanoke as adult contemporary station "Sunny 93.5 and 101.7". They were still in the trust in 2011, when 101.7, then known as WSNZ, was repaired with 106.1. This time, the stations broadcast an adult hits format as Steve FM, which had debuted on 106.1 MHz (WSFF) in 2009.

=== EMF ownership ===
Though Clear Channel, later known as iHeartMedia, had been operating the 106.1 Roanoke and 101.7 Lynchburg facilities, it had not owned them since 2008, when Clear Channel was taken private. That required the placement of the facilities into a trust, the Aloha Station Trust, for eventual divestiture. The trust configuration had already been determined when the simulcast changes of 2007 occurred. After 11 years, iHeart announced a divestiture proposal for four of the stations in the trust, including WSNZ and WSFF. They were traded to the Educational Media Foundation, owner of the national K-Love and Air1 networks, along with stations in Georgia and Ohio in exchange for six translators that iHeart programmed but EMF owned.

On May 30, the Steve format moved to 104.9 MHz as WSTV. EMF closed on the acquisition the next day and changed WSNZ's call sign to WAWX.
