= 1350 AM =

AM radio frequency

The following radio stations broadcast on AM frequency 1350 kHz: 1350 AM is a Regional broadcast frequency.

Because 1350 kHz is a multiple of both 9 and 10, the frequency is available for use by broadcast stations in all three ITU regions.

== Argentina ==
- LRJ747 in Cordoba
- LS6 in Buenos Aires

== Canada ==
Call sign	City of license	Daytime power (kW)	Nighttime power (kW)	Transmitter coordinates
CBKY	Keremeos, British Columbia	0.04	0.04	49.204722°N 119.818611°W
CBRZ	Bralorne, British Columbia	0.04	0.04	50.776389°N 122.817778°W
CIRF	Brampton, Ontario	1	0.04	43.588179°N 79.884006°W
CKAD	Middleton, Nova Scotia	1	1	44.9875°N 65.02°W

== Italy ==
- I AM Radio in Milano area

== Mexico ==
- XECTZ-AM in Cuetzalan, Puebla
- XELBL-AM in San Luis Rio Colorado, Sonora
- XEQK-AM in Mexico City
- XETB-AM in Gómez Palacio, Durango
- XEZD-AM in Cd. Camargo, Tamaulipas

== Panama ==
- HOZ38 at Panama

== Philippines ==
- DZXQ in Manila

== United States ==
Call sign	City of license	Facility ID	Class	Daytime power (kW)	Nighttime power (kW)	Unlimited power (kW)	Transmitter coordinates
KABQ	Albuquerque, New Mexico	65394	B	5	0.5		35.100556°N 106.676111°W
KBRX	O'Neill, Nebraska	55078	D	1	0.044		42.459444°N 98.656389°W
KCHK	New Prague, Minnesota	34904	D	0.5	0.07		44.5775°N 93.504444°W
KDIO	Ortonville, Minnesota	67770	D	0.67	0.038		45.349722°N 96.452222°W
KFTP	Duncan, Oklahoma	17730	D	0.18	0.07		34.511944°N 97.968056°W
KHDY	Clarksville, Texas	4046	D	0.41	0.065		33.613056°N 95.0175°W
KLHC	Bakersfield, California	61420	D	1	0.033		35.35°N 118.982778°W
KMAN	Manhattan, Kansas	39783	D	0.5	0.04		39.210556°N 96.556389°W
KPWK	San Bernardino, California	2399	B	5	0.6		34.093611°N 117.299167°W
KRAP	Washington, Missouri	53552	D	0.5	0.084		38.578889°N 90.999167°W
KRLC	Lewiston, Idaho	28216	D	5	0.158		46.393056°N 116.991111°W
KRNT	Des Moines, Iowa	58534	B	5	5		41.558611°N 93.579167°W
KSRO	Santa Rosa, California	22881	B	5	5		38.439444°N 122.7475°W
KTIK	Nampa, Idaho	16854	B	5	0.6		43.549444°N 116.410556°W
KTLQ	Tahlequah, Oklahoma	16567	D	1	0.061		35.895278°N 94.953333°W
KUBE	Pueblo, Colorado	53850	B	1.3	0.15		38.357778°N 104.638611°W
KUSG	Agana, Guam	160741	B	0.25	0.25		13.456667°N 144.672222°E
KXTN	San Antonio, Texas	67069	B	5	5		29.524167°N 98.618056°W
WARF	Akron, Ohio	49951	B			5	41.168056°N 81.5125°W
WAUN	Portage, Wisconsin	35516	D	1	0.041		43.528333°N 89.433611°W
WBLT	Bedford, Virginia	4534	D	5	0.047		37.3475°N 79.523611°W
WBML	Warner Robins, Georgia	67210	B	15	0.5		32.616667°N 83.65°W
WCHI	Chillicothe, Ohio	74225	D	1	0.028		39.321111°N 82.9525°W
WCMP	Pine City, Minnesota	52622	D	1	0.052		45.819444°N 92.995833°W
WCSM	Celina, Ohio	26470	D	0.5	0.011		40.537222°N 84.588333°W
WDCF	Dade City, Florida	12294	B	1	0.5		28.334444°N 82.189722°W
WEGA	Vega Baja, Puerto Rico	69853	B	2.5	2.5		18.477222°N 66.395278°W
WFNS	Blackshear, Georgia	11076	D	2.5	0.117		31.312222°N 82.233333°W
WGDN	Gladwin, Michigan	2483	D	0.25			43.950833°N 84.509444°W
WGPL	Portsmouth, Virginia	69560	B	5	5		36.883333°N 76.372778°W
WHIP	Mooresville, North Carolina	43740	D	1	0.067		35.601111°N 80.814167°W
WHNM	Laconia, New Hampshire	23321	D	5	0.112		43.5075°N 71.516667°W
WHWH	Princeton, New Jersey	47426	B	5	5		40.366667°N 74.743889°W
WINY	Putnam, Connecticut	24112	D	5	0.079		41.902778°N 71.895278°W
WIOU	Kokomo, Indiana	41849	B	5	1		40.416944°N 86.113611°W
WKCU	Corinth, Mississippi	66282	D	0.9	0.044		34.908056°N 88.501667°W
WLLY	Wilson, North Carolina	20661	D	1	0.079		35.723333°N 77.921111°W
WLOU	Louisville, Kentucky	31883	B	2.2	0.5		38.231111°N 85.822778°W
WMMV	Cocoa, Florida	20371	B	1	1		28.366111°N 80.752222°W
WNLK	Norwalk, Connecticut	14378	B	1	0.5		41.115°N 73.435°W
WNTX	Fredericksburg, Virginia	65640	D	1	0.037		38.312778°N 77.438889°W
WNVA	Norton, Virginia	54895	D	5	0.037		36.941944°N 82.596667°W
WOAM	Peoria, Illinois	33878	B	1	1		40.594722°N 89.594444°W
WOYK	York, Pennsylvania	73873	B	5	1		39.933611°N 76.816944°W
WRKM	Carthage, Tennessee	73598	D	1	0.09		36.245°N 85.945556°W
WRNY	Rome, New York	53657	D	0.5	0.057		43.205°N 75.485556°W
WRWH	Cleveland, Georgia	48761	D	1	0.093		34.586389°N 83.766944°W
WSIQ	Salem, Illinois	70298	D	0.43	0.059		38.632222°N 88.917222°W
WTDR	Gadsden, Alabama	13849	B	5	1		34.0175°N 86.0875°W
WWWL	New Orleans, Louisiana	72959	B	5	0.48		29.924167°N 90.034444°W
WZGM	Black Mountain, North Carolina	40654	D	10	0.056		35.591389°N 82.414722°W
WZKO	Fort Myers, Florida	39798	D	2	0.15		26.625278°N 81.841389°W
