= WIQO-FM =

- Forest, Virginia; United States
- Broadcast area: Lynchburg metro area
- Frequency: 100.9 MHz
- Branding: 100.9 WIQO

Programming
- Format: Talk radio
- Affiliations: CBS Radio News

Ownership
- Owner: Three Daughters Media
- Sister stations: WBLT, WGMN, WMNA, WMNA-FM, WVGM

History
- First air date: October 1965
- Former call signs: WKEY-FM (1965–1977)

Technical information
- Licensing authority: FCC
- Facility ID: 73158
- Class: A
- ERP: 200 watts
- HAAT: 511 meters (1,677 ft)
- Transmitter coordinates: 37°28′19.0″N 79°22′28.0″W
- Repeater: 106.3 WMNA-FM (Gretna)

Links
- Public license information: Public file; LMS
- Webcast: Listen live
- Website: wiqoradio.com

WIQO-FM (100.9 FM) is a commercial radio station licensed to Forest, Virginia, United States, and serving the Lynchburg metropolitan area. It simulcasts a talk radio format with sister station WMNA-FM in Gretna, Virginia. They are owned and operated by Three Daughters Media.

The transmitter is sited on North Business Mountain Road in Forest, Virginia.

== History ==
The station signed on the air in October 1965. It originally had the call sign WKEY-FM and was located in Covington, Virginia. It was the sister station of WKEY 1340 AM and was owned by WKEY, Inc. In the early and mid-1970s, the station played easy listening music and was an affiliate of the ABC FM Network.

In 1977, the station was moved to the more lucrative Lynchburg radio market. It took the call letters WIQO-FM.

== Programming ==
Janet Rose hosts the station's local morning show; the remainder of the schedule is nationally syndicated conservative talk programs.
