= WMNA =

WMNA may refer to:

- WMNA-FM, a radio station (106.3 FM) licensed to Gretna, Virginia, United States, United States
- WMNA (AM), a radio station (730 AM) licensed to Gretna, Virginia, United States, United States
