= WGDN =

WGDN can refer to:

- WGDN (AM), a radio station (1350 AM) licensed to Gladwin, Michigan, United States
- WGDN-FM, a radio station (103.1 FM) licensed to Gladwin, Michigan, United States
