= WGDN (AM) =

- Gladwin, Michigan; United States
- Broadcast area: (Daytime)
- Frequency: 1350 kHz
- Branding: The Northern Light 96.5 FM

Programming
- Format: Religious
- Affiliations: WGDN-FM

Ownership
- Owner: Apple Broadcasting Company

History
- First air date: December 7, 1974
- Former call signs: WJEB (12/7/74-2/9/87)
- Call sign meaning: Gladwin, Michigan

Technical information
- Licensing authority: FCC
- Class: D
- Power: 250 watts day only
- Transmitter coordinates: 43°57′03″N 84°30′34″W
- Translators: W243EA (96.5 MHz, Gladwin)

Links
- Public license information: Public file; LMS
- Website: 103country.com

WGDN (1350 AM) is a radio station licensed to Gladwin, Michigan broadcasting a religious format. It is a daytime only station broadcasting on a frequency of 1350 kHz at a power output of 250 watts, non-directional.

== History ==
=== Beginnings ===
WGDN's construction permit was issued on November 28, 1973, to Gladwin Broadcasting Company, headed by George Benko, a resident of Croswell, in Michigan's Thumb Area. Benko today owns Sanilac Broadcasting, licensee of WMIC, WTGV, and WBGV.

The station made its debut on December 7, 1974 as WJEB, broadcasting a country music format. The station did broadcast on its current frequency, but did so using a two-tower directional antenna system, allowing it to operate with an output power of 1,000 watts, but still daytime only. The station's studios, offices and transmitter facility were located at 3601 West Woods Road in Gladwin, and remain there today.

On December 10, 1974, shortly after its initial sign-on, the FCC granted WGDN pre-sunrise authorization to operate at 350 watts two hours before local sunrise, allowing it to sign-on at 6am year-round, rather than local sunrise time.

In 1977, Gladwin Broadcasting Company was granted a construction permit for an FM station. That station, WGMM, went on the air February 7, 1979 with an easy-listening format.

=== Sale to Apple Broadcasting ===
In December 1986, Gladwin Broadcasting Company agreed to sell WGDN and WGMM to Apple Broadcasting Company, for $75,000. The company was headed by Michael Baker, who also served as station general manager, sales manager, and chief engineer. Concurrent with the ownership change, approved the following March, was a call letter change for both stations to its current incarnation. The format offerings for both stations remained relatively unchanged.

This changed in 1989, when the owner principals of Apple Broadcasting Company changed. Timothy Coston became company president, and Steve Coston assumed the position of general manager. The Costons are brothers. In 1991, both radio stations were programming an easy listening format, though still separate entities.

In 1993, WGDN changed its format to adult contemporary, while WGDN-FM maintained its easy listening format. The latter also received an increase to its current power level that year.

In 2001, WGDN adopted a religious format, which continues today. Concurrent with this format flip was WGDN-FM's move to country music, both formats continue today.

In 2011, Timothy Coston sold his shares in Apple Broadcasting to Steve Coston and another shareholder, Ralph Haines III, giving his brother controlling interest in the station (51%).
