= Marlette High School =

Marlette Jr./Sr. High School

Location
- 3051 Moore Street; Marlette, Michigan 48453; United States; 43.3267°N 83.0745°W

Information
- Funding type: Public
- Opened: 1967
- School district: Marlette Community Schools
- Principal: Jessica Owen
- Faculty: 19.84 (FTE)
- Grades: 6-12
- Enrollment: 369 (2023–2024)
- Student to teacher ratio: 18.60
- Classrooms: 28
- Colors: Red and white
- Mascot: Red Raiders
- Website: Malrette Jr./Sr. High School

Marlette Jr./Sr. High School is located in Marlette, Michigan. It is a Class C School district. The current building has served as the high school since its construction in 1967 and is also currently used as the middle school as well as the high school.
