= Washington Conference (1943) =

US-UK World War II strategy meeting

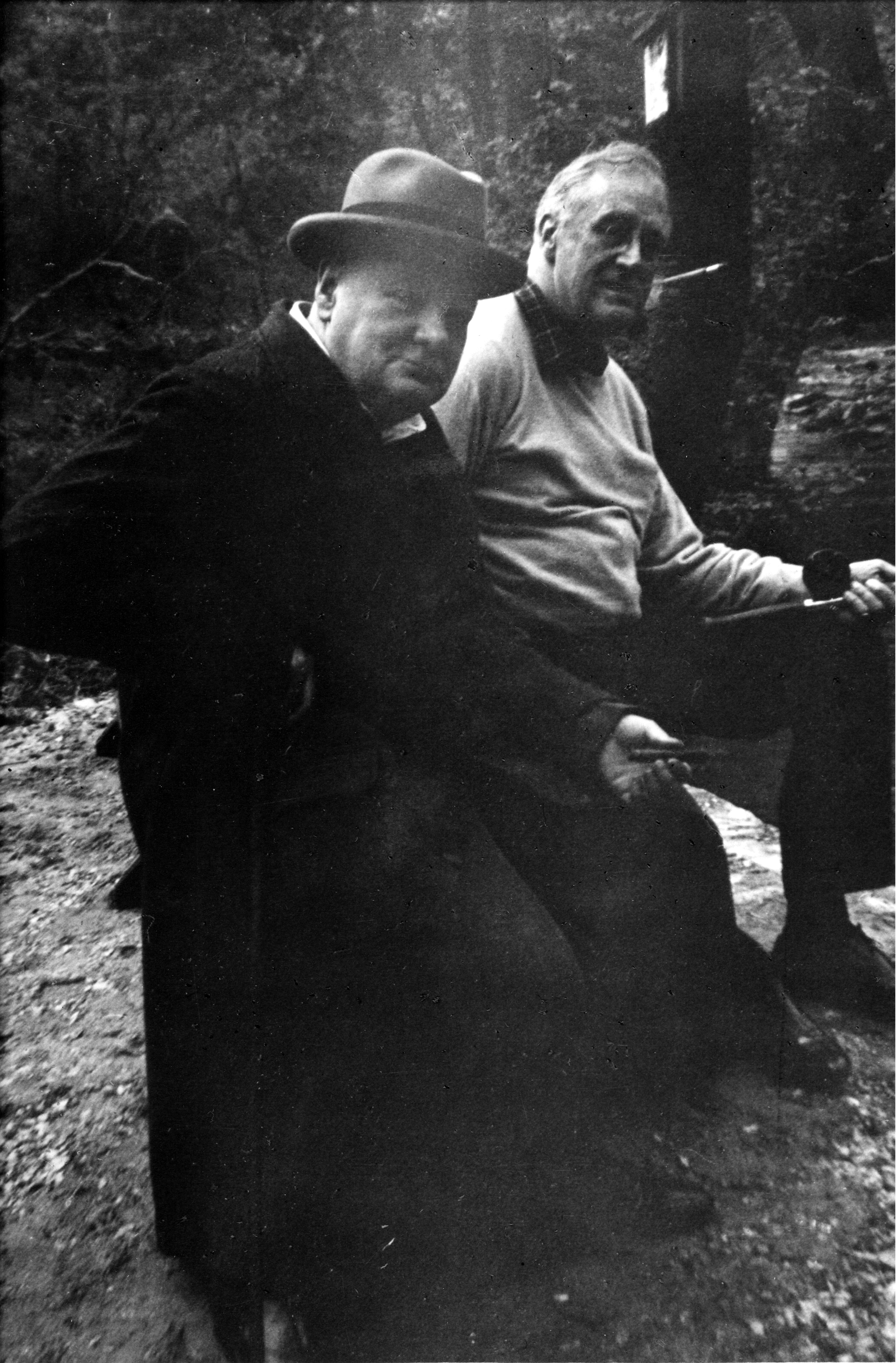
President Franklin D. Roosevelt and Prime Minister Winston Churchill fishing at Shangri-La, in between the May 1943 Trident Conference discussions.

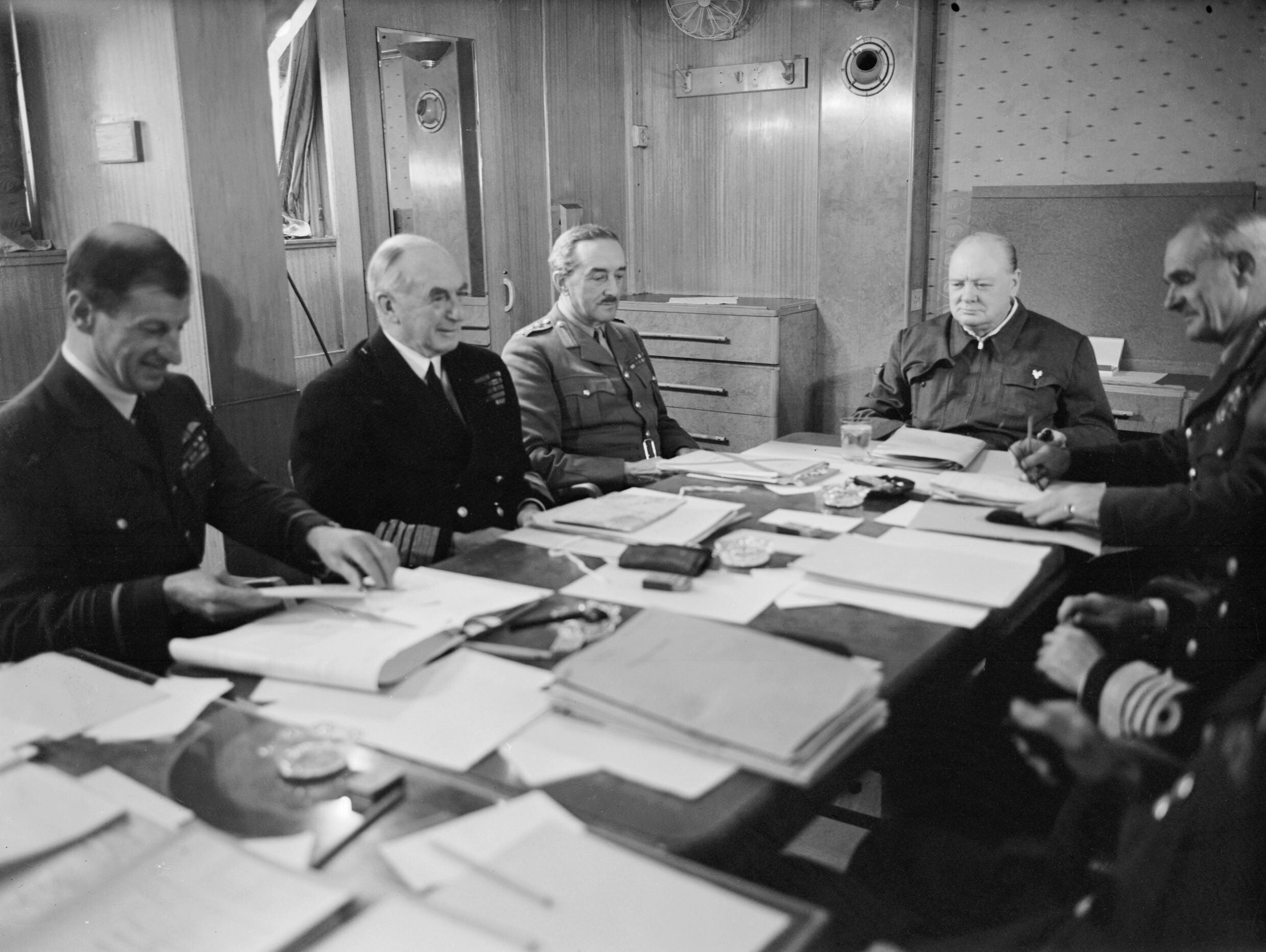
Winston Churchill and his chiefs of staff en route to the USA

The Third Washington Conference (codenamed Trident) was held in Washington, D.C from May 12 to May 25, 1943. It was a World War II strategic meeting between the heads of government of the United Kingdom and the United States. It was the third conference of the 20th century (1941, 1942, 1943), but the second conference that took place during the US involvement in the Second World War. The delegations were headed by Winston Churchill and Franklin D. Roosevelt, respectively.

The plans for the Allied invasion of Sicily, extent of military force, the date for invading Normandy, and the progress of the Pacific War were discussed.

== Meetings ==
Churchill and Roosevelt met every two days in the White House, and the British and American military leaders met almost daily in the Board of Governors Room at the Federal Reserve Building.

== Topics of discussion and agreements ==
Churchill opened the discussion with ideas, which were discussed in an open manner between the two countries. The main topics that were discussed were the Italian Campaign, the amount of military force that should be used, the Normandy landings, and how to help China in the Pacific War. Churchill felt that the extent of the operations and their priority could be solved by mutual agreement, and consensus was reached on all issues.

=== The Italian campaign ===
The first topic discussed was the war in Italy. Churchill persuaded the American leaders to endorse the Allied invasion of Sicily. He believed that the fighting in Italy would distract the German troops from the Eastern Front so that Russia would be given breathing room since the Germans would need to send a large number of troops to the Balkans. This would get rid of the Allies' debt to Russia from Russia's heavy engagement of German forces in Stalingrad.

Getting Italy out of the war would also help the Allies' relationship with Turkey. Turkey could no longer compete with Italy in the Mediterranean. Churchill believed that they could ask Turkey for use of their bases for future defense.

=== Extent of military force ===
The next objective discussed was the extent of the military force that the Allies should use. Both countries agreed that they should use the greatest amount of military force against the enemy, including armies, air forces and munitions. Unconditional surrender, first mentioned at the Casablanca Conference, was debated again at Trident. Both Trident and Casablanca had competitive atmospheres due to the differing views on unconditional surrender. Roosevelt was persistent against American General Dwight D. Eisenhower and British General Henry Maitland Wilson's anti-unconditional views of surrender.

Despite these opposing views, after much consideration, the Allies agreed that they wanted to carry the war to Japan. They believed that Germany would be out of the war in 1944, so they would need to concentrate on defeating Japan in 1945. The best solution would be involving Russia in the fight against Japan because Stalin had indicated his interest in taking part in Japan's defeat.

=== The Normandy landings ===
The Normandy landings were postponed for 12 months to May 1944. This was because the US and the UK speculated that they could build up troop strength, produce more landing craft and supplies, and thus ensure complete command of air and sea by doing so. They discussed the difficult beaches with large tides, the large German enemy defenses, the optimal timing to attack, and relevant weather conditions.

The main reason why the Allies wanted to postpone the landings was because of their lack of supplies in 1943. All the British landing craft had been deployed to Operation Husky, and only one US division was available due to a higher priority of Operation Sickle in the war.

=== Aid to China ===
Lastly, the US and the UK decided what to do in the Pacific War. British Field Marshal Wavell visited Burma and helped brace the Allies for the many obstacles they would face, including:

- the thick jungle preventing the use of modern weapons
- the monsoons that limited the amount of potential attack time
- few options for naval support

Other than air support, there were few alternatives to help China, so efficient planning was necessary. The countries agreed it would be better to by-pass a ground attack in Burma and instead use the element of surprise by air attack, as in Operation Torch. The fleet from Italy was to cover this operation in March 1944.

== Other results ==
The Trident Conference shows a change in domination over world leadership, as the Americans were influential over other countries. American initiatives received twice the amount of Allied military resources, while Britain had to compromise on several of their requests. In particular, US Army Chief of Staff General George Marshall led this change to increase the role of the Americans in the war effort, which had been previously dominated by Britain.

However, the actions after Sicily still remained unsettled. Churchill wanted an Italian Campaign to follow, but Roosevelt worried that the campaign might delay the strategic plans for recapturing France that had been planned for the following year. According to Max Hastings, Alan Brooke's reputation as a strategist was "significantly damaged" by his remarks at the Trident Conference, where he claimed that no major operations on the continent would be possible until 1945 or 1946. Brooke's diary says that he wanted "operations in the Mediterranean to force a dispersal of German forces, help Russia, and thus eventually produce a situation where cross Channel operations are possible" but that Churchill entirely repudiated (or half repudiated) the paper the CCOS had agreed on; Harry Hopkins got him to withdraw his proposed amendments.

== See also ==
- Washington Conference (disambiguation)
- List of Allied World War II conferences
- Winston Churchill's address to Congress (1943)
