= Arcadia Conference =

Allied planning conference during World War II

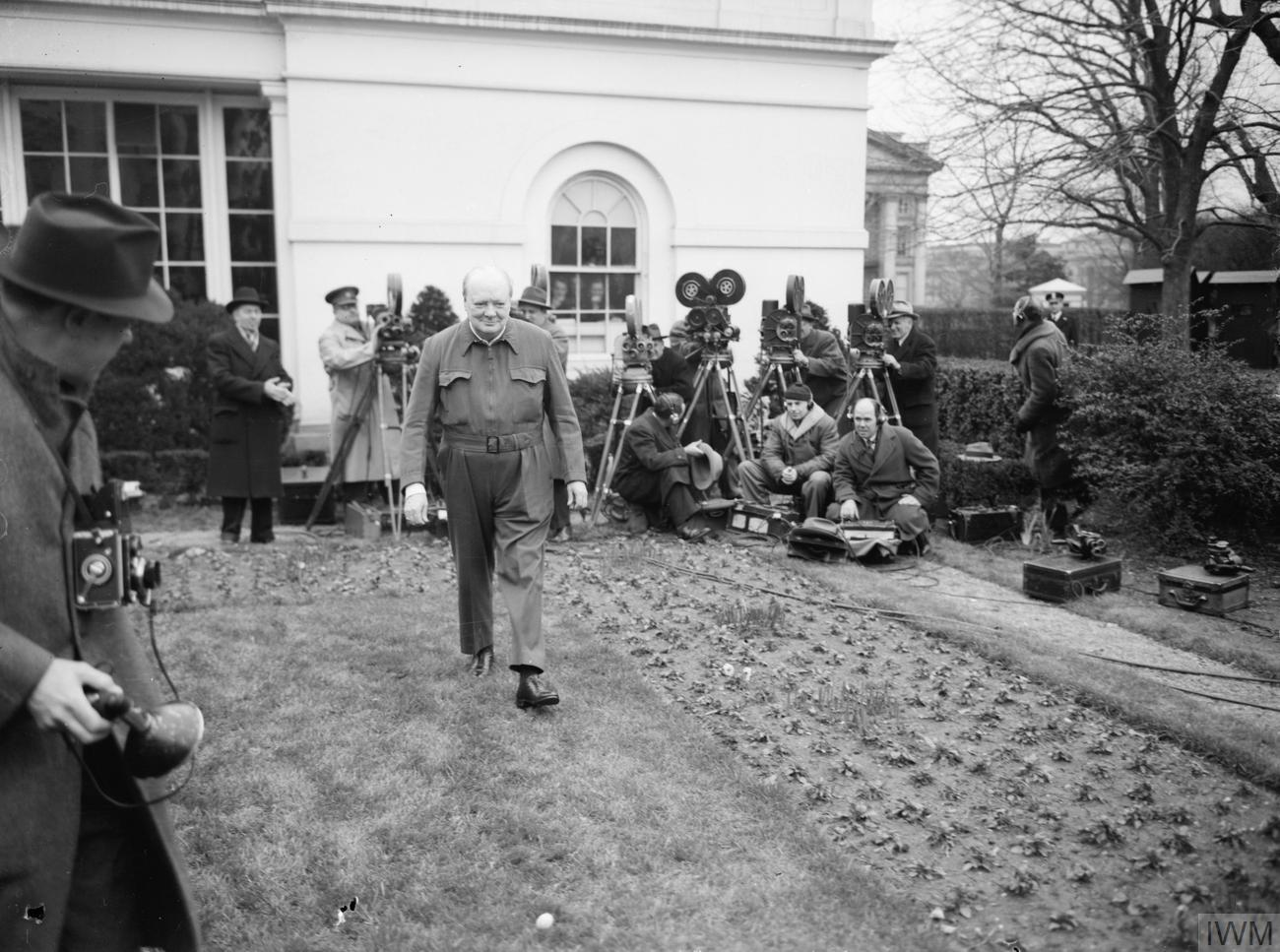
Winston Churchill at the White House in January 1942.

The First Washington Conference, also known as the Arcadia Conference (ARCADIA was the code name used for the conference), was held in Washington, D.C., from December 22, 1941, to January 14, 1942. President Roosevelt of the United States and Prime Minister Churchill of the United Kingdom attended the conference. Major decisions included making the defeat of Germany the highest war priority and the establishment of a Combined Chiefs of Staff to coordinate US and British military planning. Representatives of the Allies adopted the Declaration by United Nations, which committed them to make no separate peace with the enemy, and to employ their full resources until victory.

== Background ==
From December 7 to December 8, 1941, Japan invaded Thailand and attacked the United States military and naval bases in Hawaii, the Philippines, Wake Island, and Guam as well as the British colonies of Malaya, Singapore, and Hong Kong.

Over the following few days, Australia, Canada, China, the Netherlands, the United Kingdom, (Note: See United Kingdom declaration of war on Japan.) and the United States (Note: See United States declaration of war on Japan.) declared war on Japan. Four days after Pearl Harbor, Germany and Italy declared war on the United States, drawing the country into a two-theater war.

== History ==
The conference brought together the top British and American military leaders, as well as Winston Churchill and Franklin Roosevelt and their aides, in Washington from December 22, 1941, to January 14, 1942, and led to a series of major decisions that shaped the war effort in 1942–1943.

From the start, significant differences in strategic priorities appeared. The British sought to push the Axis out of the Mediterranean, securing their lines of communications to their forces in India and the Far East. The American Navy, led by Admiral King, wished to prioritize fighting Japan, while the American Army, led by George C. Marshall, argued in favor of an immediate cross-channel invasion of Europe in 1942. Marshall suggested withdrawing from the liberation of Europe if the British did not agree to his plan. Roosevelt, favoring naval strategy, was persuaded by Churchill to prioritize the Mediterranean, and even suggested to the Soviet Ambassador Litvinov that a landing in North Africa might enable attacking German-occupied Europe from the south. On Churchill's last day in Washington, the invasion of Guadalcanal was approved.

Roosevelt ultimately overruled Marshall after the British studied the feasibility of a cross-channel invasion and found it to be impossible in 1942. General Mark Clark, commander of all American forces in Britain, corroborated this conclusion later that year, pointing out that only one infantry division (the 34th Infantry Division) was available, but had neither amphibious training, anti-aircraft guns, tanks, nor landing craft. The 1st Armored Division also lacked equipment, as were the new divisions arriving in-theater.

The main policy achievements of Arcadia included the decision for "Germany First" (or "Europe first"—that is, the defeat of Germany was the highest priority); the establishment of the Combined Chiefs of Staff, based in Washington, for approving the military decisions of both the US and Britain; the principle of unity of command of each theater under a supreme commander; drawing up measures to keep China in the war; limiting the reinforcements to be sent to the Pacific; and setting up a system for coordinating shipping. All the decisions were secret, except the conference drafted the Declaration by United Nations, which committed the Allies to make no separate peace with the enemy, and to employ full resources until victory.

In immediate tactical terms, the decisions at Arcadia included an invasion of North Africa in 1942, sending American bombers to bases in England, and for the British to strengthen their forces in the Pacific. Arcadia created a unified American-British-Dutch-Australian Command (ABDA) in the Far East; the ABDA fared poorly. It was also agreed at the conference to combine military resources under one command in the European Theater of Operations (ETO).

== Participants ==
Heads of state/government

President of the United States, Franklin D. Roosevelt
Prime Minister of the United Kingdom, Winston Churchill

British officers

Admiral of the Fleet, Sir Dudley Pound, First Sea Lord and Chief of the Naval Staff
Field Marshal Sir John Dill – Chief of the Imperial General Staff (replaced as CIGS by Alan Brooke during conference)
Air Chief Marshal Sir Charles Portal, Chief of Air Staff
Admiral Sir Charles Little, Head of British Joint Staff Mission to USA
Lt. General Sir Colville Wemyss, Head of the British Army Mission to USA. Joint Staff Mission
Air Marshal Arthur Harris, Head of RAF delegation to the USA. Joint Staff Mission

British officials

Lord Halifax, British Ambassador to the United States

U.S. Naval officers

Admiral H. R. Stark, Chief of Naval Operations
Admiral E. J. King, Commander-in-Chief, U.S. Fleet
Rear Admiral F. J. Horne, Assistant Chief of Naval Operations
Rear Admiral J. H. Towers, Chief, Bureau of Aeronautics
Rear Admiral R. K. Turner, Director, War Plans Division
Major General Thomas Holcomb, Commandant, U.S. Marine Corps

U.S. Army officers

General George C. Marshall, Commanding General of the Field Forces and Chief of Staff, U.S. Army
Lieut. General H. H. Arnold, Chief of the Army Air Forces and Deputy Chief of Staff, U.S. Army
Brigadier General L. T. Gerow, Chief of War Plans Division

Joint secretaries

Captain J. L. McCrea, Aide to Chief of Naval Operations
Lieut. Colonel P. M. Robinett, G-2, GHQ, U.S. Army
Major William T. Sexton, Assistant Secretary, W.D.G.S.

Chinese officials

T. V. Soong, Minister of Foreign Affairs

== See also ==
- Diplomatic history of World War II
- Washington Conference
- List of Allied World War II conferences
- U.S.-British Staff Conference (ABC-1) – the staff meeting that laid the groundwork for this political meeting.
- Second Washington Conference
- Third Washington Conference
