= WIOU =

WIOU may refer to:

- WIOU (AM), a radio station (1350 AM) licensed to Kokomo, Indiana, United States
- WIOU (TV series), a short-lived American television drama
