= WZBL =

WZBL may refer to:

- WZBL (FM), a radio station (88.1 FM) licensed to serve Barnegat Light, New Jersey, United States
- WLRX (FM), a radio station (106.1 FM) licensed to serve Vinton, Virginia, United States, which held the call sign WZBL from 2007 to 2009
