= Marlette, Michigan =

- Location of Marlette, Michigan

- Location within Michigan
- Coordinates: 43°19′39″N 83°4′45″W
- Country: United States
- State: Michigan
- County: Sanilac

Area
  - Total: 1.62 sq mi (4.19 km^{2})
  - Land: 1.61 sq mi (4.18 km^{2})
  - Water: 0.0039 sq mi (0.01 km^{2})
- Elevation: 837 ft (255 m)

Population (2020)
  - Total: 1,855
  - Density: 1,148.9/sq mi (443.59/km^{2})
- Time zone: UTC-5 (Eastern (EST))
  - Summer (DST): UTC-4 (EDT)
- ZIP code: 48453
- Area code: 989
- FIPS code: 26-51820
- GNIS feature ID: 0631595
- Website: cityofmarlette.com

Marlette is a city in Sanilac County in the U.S. state of Michigan. The population was 1,855 at the time of the 2020 census. The city is surrounded by Marlette Township, but is administratively autonomous.

Marlette is known as "The Heart of the Thumb" due to its location in Michigan's thumb.

== History ==
The history of the City of Marlette and surrounding Marlette Township are intertwined. Many social and commercial relationships unite the community such public schooling, public library, dining and charity. Marlette was first settled in the 1850s by people from Ontario who sought tall timber and fertile soil. The community name was derived from the "Marlatt" family of settlers, who carved their name on a log shanty. Marlette Township was created in 1859 from portions of Sanilac Township and Buel Township. Marlette became recognized as a village within the township in 1865. The village incorporated in 1881 to allow separate administration and taxation to improve common areas of the town. Marlette became a city in 1984.

== Geography ==
According to the United States Census Bureau, the city has a total area of 1.64 square miles (4.25 km^{2}), all land.

The Marlette ZIP code 48453 also serves all of Marlette Township, except for the northeast corner, as well as parts of southern Lamotte Township, the southwest part of Elmer Township, the northwest part of Flynn Township, the northeast corner of Elk Township, parts of northern Burnside Township and eastern Burlington Township in Lapeer County and the southeast corner of Koylton Township in Tuscola County.

== Media ==
Marlette's commercial radio station, WBGV 92.5 FM, features a country music format. It is owned by Sanilac/GB Broadcasting, who also owns WMIC and WTGV, in nearby Sandusky. Marlette is also served by Smile FM broadcasting on 88.1 FM (WHYT) from Imlay City and 103.7 FM (WCZE) from Harbor Beach with Contemporary Christian Music radio, local news and weather.

== Airport ==
The Marlette Township Airport (FAA Identifier: 77G) is a class C airport with 2 paved runways, both approximately 3,500 feet long. It is capable of handling small business jets and medium-size cargo planes. It opened in May 1975.

== Hospital ==
The town is home to Marlette Regional Hospital and Seton Cancer Institute - a partnership of Marlette Regional and St. Mary's of Michigan. This provides residents in the "thumb" region with advanced cancer research and treatment.

== Demographics ==
Historical population
Census	Pop.	Note	%±
1900	996		—
1910	1,062		6.6%
1920	969		−8.8%
1930	990		2.2%
1940	1,161		17.3%
1950	1,489		28.3%
1960	1,640		10.1%
1970	1,706		4.0%
1980	1,761		3.2%
1990	1,924		9.3%
2000	2,104		9.4%
2010	1,875		−10.9%
2020	1,855		−1.1%
U.S. Decennial Census

=== 2020 census ===
As of the 2020 census, Marlette had a population of 1,855. The median age was 39.8 years. 23.0% of residents were under the age of 18 and 20.6% of residents were 65 years of age or older. For every 100 females there were 91.0 males, and for every 100 females age 18 and over there were 87.2 males age 18 and over.

0.0% of residents lived in urban areas, while 100.0% lived in rural areas.

There were 725 households in Marlette, of which 30.1% had children under the age of 18 living in them. Of all households, 39.4% were married-couple households, 17.9% were households with a male householder and no spouse or partner present, and 33.0% were households with a female householder and no spouse or partner present. About 31.3% of all households were made up of individuals and 14.2% had someone living alone who was 65 years of age or older.

There were 812 housing units, of which 10.7% were vacant. The homeowner vacancy rate was 1.6% and the rental vacancy rate was 10.0%.

Racial composition as of the 2020 census
Race	Number	Percent
White	1,707	92.0%
Black or African American	17	0.9%
American Indian and Alaska Native	10	0.5%
Asian	4	0.2%
Native Hawaiian and Other Pacific Islander	0	0.0%
Some other race	15	0.8%
Two or more races	102	5.5%
Hispanic or Latino (of any race)	76	4.1%

=== 2010 census ===
As of the census of 2010, there were 1,875 people, 742 households, and 469 families living in the city. The population density was 1,143.3 inhabitants per square mile (441.4/km^{2}). There were 864 housing units at an average density of 526.8 per square mile (203.4/km^{2}). The racial makeup of the city was 95.9% White, 0.3% African American, 0.6% Native American, 0.7% Asian, 0.4% from other races, and 2.1% from two or more races. Hispanic or Latino of any race were 3.4% of the population.

There were 742 households, of which 34.1% had children under the age of 18 living with them, 43.8% were married couples living together, 15.6% had a female householder with no husband present, 3.8% had a male householder with no wife present, and 36.8% were non-families. 31.5% of all households were made up of individuals, and 18% had someone living alone who was 65 years of age or older. The average household size was 2.43 and the average family size was 3.03.

The median age in the city was 39.4 years. 25.2% of residents were under the age of 18; 8.7% were between the ages of 18 and 24; 23.1% were from 25 to 44; 25.6% were from 45 to 64; and 17.2% were 65 years of age or older. The gender makeup of the city was 47.3% male and 52.7% female.

=== 2000 census ===
As of the census of 2000, there were 2,104 people, 787 households, and 497 families living in the city. The population density was 1,277.3 inhabitants per square mile (493.2/km^{2}). There were 839 housing units at an average density of 509.4 per square mile (196.7/km^{2}). The racial makeup of the city was 93.82% White, 2.28% African American, 0.33% Native American, 0.29% Asian, 1.47% from other races, and 1.81% from two or more races. Hispanic or Latino of any race were 2.52% of the population.

There were 787 households, out of which 34.3% had children under the age of 18 living with them, 47.1% were married couples living together, 12.8% had a female householder with no husband present, and 36.8% were non-families. 32.9% of all households were made up of individuals, and 15.0% had someone living alone who was 65 years of age or older. The average household size was 2.44 and the average family size was 3.09.

In the city, the population was spread out, with 30.7% under the age of 18, 8.8% from 18 to 24, 25.2% from 25 to 44, 18.8% from 45 to 64, and 16.5% who were 65 years of age or older. The median age was 34 years. For every 100 females, there were 97.0 males. For every 100 females age 18 and over, there were 82.1 males.

The median income for a household in the city was $30,938, and the median income for a family was $37,880. Males had a median income of $33,250 versus $21,725 for females. The per capita income for the city was $15,592. About 9.0% of families and 10.9% of the population were below the poverty line, including 10.7% of those under age 18 and 7.8% of those age 65 or over.

== Notable people ==
- Tom Wargo, professional golfer was born in Marlette
- Rex Scouten, White House Usher, was a graduate of Marlette High School
- John L. McCrea, Naval aide to President Franklin D. Roosevelt, later first commanding officer on the U.S.S Iowa, was born in Marlette
