= WLLY =

WLLY may refer to:

- WLLY (AM), a radio station (1350 AM) licensed to serve Wilson, North Carolina, United States
- WLLY-FM, a radio station (99.5 FM) licensed to serve Palm Beach Gardens, Florida, United States
