= WBLT =

Simulcasts WGMN Roanoke
- Bedford, Virginia; United States
- Broadcast area: Bedford County, Virginia
- Frequency: 1350 kHz
- Branding: Virginia Talk Radio Network

Programming
- Format: News/talk
- Affiliations: CBS News Radio; Fox News Radio; Compass Media Networks; Westwood One

Ownership
- Owner: Three Daughters Media
- Sister stations: WGMN, WIQO-FM, WMNA, WMNA-FM, WVGM

History
- First air date: February 9, 1950; 76 years ago
- Former call signs: WBLX (1950); WBLT (1950–2003); DWBLT (2003) (Note: License revoked and callsign deleted on October 1, 2003 due to improper filing of paperwork by then-owners WBLT, Inc. The station returned to air on December 29, 2003 and the violation was expunged in 2008.)
- Former frequencies: 1490 kHz (1950–1951)

Technical information
- Licensing authority: FCC
- Facility ID: 4534
- Class: D
- Power: 5,000 watts day 47 watts night
- Transmitter coordinates: 37°20′51.0″N 79°31′25.0″W
- Translator: 95.5 W238FH (Bedford)

Links
- Public license information: Public file; LMS
- Webcast: Listen Live
- Website: virginiatalkradionetwork.com

WBLT (1350 AM) is a commercial radio station licensed to Bedford, Virginia, serving Bedford County, Virginia. WBLT broadcasts a news/talk format and is owned and operated by Three Daughters Media. WBLT simulcasts the programming heard on WGMN.

By day, WBLT is powered at 5,000 watts non-directional. But to protect other stations on 1350 AM at night, WBLT reduces power to only 47 watts. Programming is also heard on 100-watt FM translator W283FH at 95.5 MHz.
