= WROV-FM =

- Martinsville, Virginia; United States
- Broadcast area: New River Valley; Southside Virginia
- Frequency: 96.3 MHz (HD Radio)
- Branding: 96.3 ROV Rocks

Programming
- Format: Classic rock
- Subchannels: HD2: Black Information Network
- Affiliations: John Boy and Billy; Performance Racing Network; Sixx Sense

Ownership
- Owner: iHeartMedia; (iHM Licenses, LLC)
- Sister stations: WJJS; WJJX; WSTV; WYYD

History
- First air date: January 1950
- Former call signs: WMVA-FM (1950–1989)
- Call sign meaning: Roanoke, Virginia (from former sister station WROV AM); "Rock of Virginia"

Technical information
- Licensing authority: FCC
- Facility ID: 37747
- Class: C1
- ERP: 14,000 watts
- HAAT: 633 meters (2,077 ft)
- Transmitter coordinates: 37°7′0.4″N 80°0′57.1″W
- Translator: HD2: 96.7 W244AV (Blacksburg, etc.)

Links
- Public license information: Public file; LMS
- Webcast: Listen live (via iHeartRadio)
- Website: rovrocks.iheart.com

WROV-FM (96.3 MHz) is a commercial FM radio station licensed to Martinsville, Virginia. WROV-FM is owned and operated by iHeartMedia and airs a classic rock radio format. WROV-FM's signal covers the Roanoke-Lynchburg media market, including the New River Valley and the Southside of Virginia.

WROV-FM has studios and offices on Brandon Avenue in Roanoke and its transmitter is in Boones Mill, Virginia.

== HD Radio ==
WROV-FM HD2 carries an African-American-oriented all-news format under the branding "Roanoke's BIN 96.7", reflecting its carriage on FM translator W244AV (96.7 FM) in Blacksburg.

The subchannel previously carried an alternative rock format as "96.7/96.9 Alt Project"; at the time, it was also heard on W245BG (96.9 FM) in Roanoke. On February 8, 2018, WROV-FM HD2 rebranded as "Alt 96".

On November 18, 2020, WROV-FM HD2 and W244AV changed their format from alternative rock to programming from the Black Information Network, branded as "Roanoke's BIN 96.7". The alternative rock format continues on WSTV-HD2 and W245BG.

Broadcast translator for WROV-FM HD2
Call sign	Frequency	City of license	FID	ERP (W)	HAAT	Class	FCC info
W244AV	96.7 FM	Blacksburg, etc., Virginia	37748	250	180 m (591 ft)	D	LMS

== History ==
WROV-FM first signed on the air in January 1950 as WMVA-FM. It was a sister station to WMVA and served Martinsville. In 1989, new ownership purchased WMVA-FM and WROV (now WGMN), and undertook a move of WMVA-FM to Roanoke.

=== History of call letters ===
The call letters WROV-FM were previously assigned to a station in Roanoke, Virginia. It began broadcasting on 103.7 MHz in 1948. It was a sister station of WROV and duplicated that station's programming. In 1955, WROV radio's ownership had decided to leave broadcasting altogether after the disastrous effort to start WROV-TV; new management saw the FM station as a money pit and turned in the license in June 1957.
