= WZWZ =

Coordinates: 40.472°N 86.164°W

Kokomo, Indiana; United States
- Broadcast area: Kokomo, Indiana; Logansport, Indiana; Peru, Indiana
- Frequency: 92.5 MHz
- Branding: Kokomo's Z92.5

Programming
- Format: Adult contemporary
- Affiliations: Premiere Networks

Ownership
- Owner: Hoosier AM/FM LLC
- Operator: 3 Towers Broadcasting
- Sister stations: WIOU; WMYK

History
- First air date: 1964; 61 years ago (at 93.5)
- Former frequencies: 93.5 MHz (1964–1986); 92.7 MHz (1986–1995)
- Call sign meaning: Z 92.5

Technical information
- Licensing authority: FCC
- Facility ID: 41850
- Class: A
- ERP: 6,000 watts
- HAAT: 99 meters (325 ft)

Links
- Public license information: Public file; LMS
- Webcast: Listen live
- Website: www.z925fm.com

WZWZ (92.5 FM) is a radio station owned by Hoosier AM/FM LLC in Kokomo, Indiana. The station is located on the south side of Kokomo on Indiana State Road 26, just east of Indiana State Road 931.

== History ==
For many years, WZWZ was assigned to 93.5 FM and to make room for a new FM license in Hartford City, WZWZ (Z93) agreed to move its dial position to 92.7 in January 1986. Through the early 1980s, listeners heard the slogan "Indiana's Hit Music FM" and the talent pool shared the likes of Dr. Dave (Gross), Bob Richards, Jill Savage, Tammy Lively, Pat Moore, Tom Wilhoite, Karen Joplyn, Glenn Thomas, Diane Costello, Lee McKay, Brandon Scott (Scott Howard) John McGue, Thomm Kristi, Steve Dunham (mid 80s Program Director) and Tommy Warren. Z93 carried NBC's The Source for news in the morning.

From the late 1970s through the mid-1980s, Z93 carried American Top 40. It ran at various times on Saturdays but was anchored for many years on Sunday nights. In the mid-1980s, "AT40" was replaced with Scott Shannon's Rockin' America Top 30 Countdown. Casey Kasem returned to Z93 in 1989 with Casey's Top 40. Z93 also carried the popular "King Biscuit Flour Hour" on Sunday nights. Other weekend syndicated programming included "Rock Over London" and "Off The Record with Mary Turner."

On Good Friday, April 5, 1985, at 10:50 a.m., Z93 joined thousands of radio stations worldwide in playing the song "We Are The World" by USA For Africa. On Saturday July 13, 1985, Z93 carried the worldwide radio broadcast of the first Live Aid concert. On Sunday May 25, 1986, Z93 also participated in the playing of "Hands Across America" at 3 p.m. Millions of Americans joined hands for 15 minutes across the United States to help fight homelessness and poverty. While it was not required, many people donated money to participate in the event.

In 1986, program director Darryl Parks changed the station slogan to "Most Hits Z93", changed the station logo and added jingles from JAM Creative Productions' "Hot KIIS" package. On-air talent included RJ Miles, Tim Bonnell, Matt Barnett, Scott Alan, Brian Bramwell and "The Incredible" Dave North. Rob Rupe also began his long career with the station during this time.

News personnel through the 1980s included Nancy Potter, Don McKellar, Peter Zelcs, Keith Shallenberger, Marydel Grace, Karen Hensel, Curt Alexander and Eric Berman. Eric came to WIOU and WZWZ in 1987 holding on to a secret. Months earlier he'd been a contestant on Jeopardy!. Eric kept the secret until his co-workers were surprised when his run of episodes premiered in the summer of 1987.

The 1990s saw even more changes to WZWZ and Mid America Radio assumed ownership again and rebuilt this place into a very profitable business again. Another frequency change came in January 1995 and Z93 was now at 92.5. On-air names who worked through the end of the decade included Collin Stewart, Amy Alexander, Matthew Paul, Regina Vorhees, Larry Brian, Jeff Steers, Tim Crank, Chanelle Williamson, Steve Morris, Alan Kaye, Allan James, Greg Bell, Rob Rupe, Amber Stearns and Greg Browning. Hoosier AM/FM acquired WZWZ in February 2009 and has since made a very substantial investment in the on-air sound and format of Z92.5. Early results have put the station near the top in cume listenership in the region.

In July 2024, Hoosier AM/FM announced that it was selling its Kokomo stations—WZWZ, WIOU, and WMYK—to 3 Towers Broadcasting, with a local marketing agreement taking effect on August 1. As of May 2025, the stations were still owned by Hoosier AM/FM.
