= WMNA-FM =

Simulcast of WIQO-FM, Forest, VA
- Gretna, Virginia; United States
- Broadcast area: Lynchburg metropolitan area Northern Pittsylvania County, Virginia
- Frequency: 106.3 MHz
- Branding: 100.9 WIQO

Programming
- Format: Talk radio
- Affiliations: CBS Radio News

Ownership
- Owner: 3 Daughters Media; (Burns Media Strategies)
- Sister stations: WBLT, WGMN, WMNA, WVGM

History
- First air date: February 28, 1959

Technical information
- Licensing authority: FCC
- Facility ID: 9985
- Class: A
- Power: 6,000 watts
- HAAT: 79 meters (259 ft)
- Transmitter coordinates: 36°55′31.0″N 79°19′50.0″W
- Translator: 93.3 W227BG (Timberlake)

Links
- Public license information: Public file; LMS
- Webcast: Listen live
- Website: wiqoradio.com

WMNA-FM (106.3 FM) is a commercial radio station licensed to Gretna, Virginia, United States, serving Northern Pittsylvania County and the suburbs of the Lynchburg metropolitan area. WMNA-FM is owned by 3 Daughters Media, simulcasting a talk radio format with WIQO-FM in Forest, Virginia.

Programming is also heard on 250-watt FM translator W227BG 93.3 MHz in Timberlake, Virginia.

== History ==
WMNA-FM signed on the air on February 28, 1959. It was originally powered at 3,000 watts and was a full-time simulcast of co-owned WMNA 730 AM. At the time, WMNA 730 was a daytimer, required to go off the air at night. So listeners with an FM radio could continue to hear programming on 106.3 FM. The two stations were owned by the Central Virginia Broadcasting Company and were network affiliates of the Mutual Broadcasting System.

WMNA-FM was a country music station, before being bought by Gary Burns. The station became a simulcast of Lynchburg's WLNI to extend the signal along Route 29 from Danville to Nelson County. When Burns sold WLNI to Centennial Broadcasting, he split WMNA and sold it to Three Daughters Media. It became a sports radio station as an ESPN Radio affiliate.

In November 2013 WMNA-FM switched from sports to talk radio. It began sharing programming with co-owned WIQO-FM 106.3 MHz.

== Programming ==
Janet Rose hosts the station's morning show, also simulcast on co-owned WGMN. The rest of the weekday schedule is nationally syndicated talk programs.

== Translator ==
In addition to the main station, WMNA-FM is relayed by an FM translator to widen its broadcast area.

| Call sign | Frequency | City of license | FID | ERP (W) | HAAT | Class | FCC info |
|---|---|---|---|---|---|---|---|
| W227BG | 93.3 FM | Timberlake, Virginia | 152090 | 250 watts | 94 m (308 ft) | D | LMS |
