= Omard, Michigan =

- Former community
- Location within the state of Michigan
- Coordinates: 43°15′25″N 82°54′12″W
- Country: United States
- State: Michigan
- County: Sanilac
- Township: Flynn
- Elevation: 801 ft (244 m)
- Time zone: UTC-5 (Eastern (EST))
  - Summer (DST): UTC-4 (EDT)

Omard was an unincorporated community around the intersection of Peck Road and Isles Road in Flynn Township, Sanilac County, Michigan, at approximately 43°15′25.6″N 82°54′11.3″W. The first Omard schoolhouse was built in 1863, and on April 25, 1871 a post office was opened, which would operate until March 15, 1904. According to an 1884 history of the county, the "village" basically consisted at that time of the schoolhouse (which also served as a church meeting house) and the post office. In terms of legacy, two entities still bear the name of Omard in the vicinity including a church, Omard Church (formally belonging to United Methodism and presently Non-denominational), and a cemetery—also named simply Omard Cemetery.

The post office address for that area is now Brown City, MI 48416. The local elevation is approximately 800 feet above sea level.
