= John L. McCrea =

John Livingstone McCrea
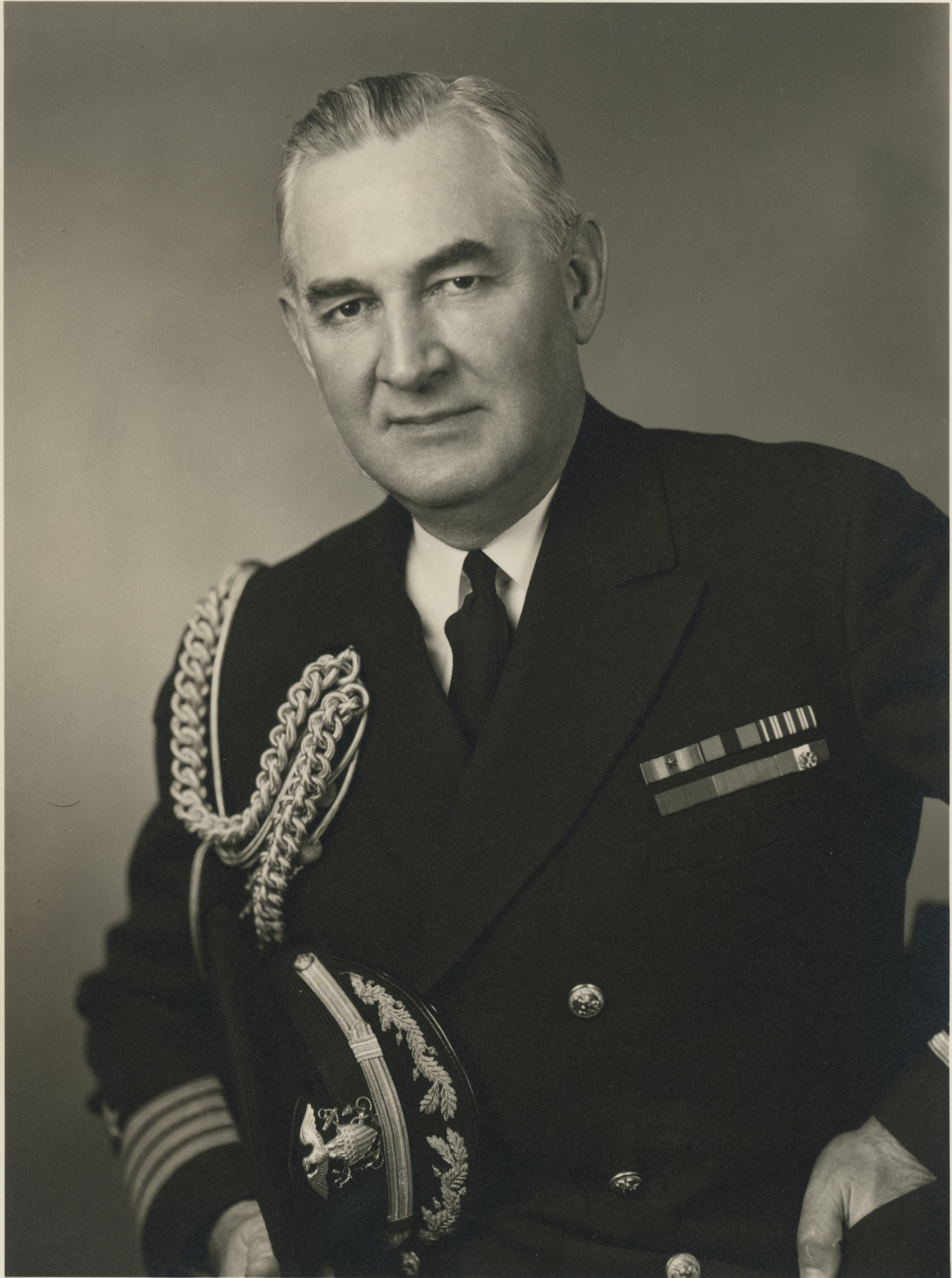
- Born: May 29, 1891; Marlette, Michigan, U.S.
- Died: January 25, 1990 (aged 98); Needham, Massachusetts, U.S.
- Education: 1915, USNA; 1923, Naval War College; 1929, LL.B., GWU Law; 1934, LL.M., GWU Law
- Spouse: Martha (?–his death)
- Children: Meredith Coyne; Annie Sullivan; stepson, Philip H. Tobey; stepdaughter, Julia C. Tobey
- Military career
- Allegiance: United States Navy
- Service years: 1915–1953
- Rank: Vice admiral
- Commands: 1924 USS Bittern (AM-36); 1943 USS Iowa (BB-61); Task force 92; 1944 Cruiser Division 3; 1944–1945 Cruiser Division 1; 1949 Director, Personnel Policy Board; 1952 First Naval District, Boston
- Conflicts: World War I; World War II

John L. McCrea (29 May 1891 – 25 January 1990) was an American naval officer of World War I and World War II, and later an insurance executive.

== Navy career ==
McCrea was graduated from the U.S. Naval Academy and commissioned an ensign in 1915. He served on the battleships USS New York (BB-34) and then in 1919 on the USS New Mexico (BB-40). He was the watch officer aboard the New York on November 21, 1918, who recorded the surrender of the Imperial German Navy High Seas Fleet in her log.

In 1921 he served on several destroyers: USS Burns (DD-171), USS Babbitt (DD-128), and USS Zeilin (DD-313). In 1922 he was executive officer of the replenishment oiler USS Ramapo (AO-12). He attended the Naval War College in 1923. His first command came in 1924, on the minesweeper USS Bittern (AM-36).

He was assigned to the Office of the Judge Advocate General in 1926, and completed his law degree in 1929. Immediately thereafter, he was Flag secretary of the Special Service Squadron in Central America. He became an aide to the Judge Advocate General in 1932, completed a master of law degree at GWU in 1934. From there he reported aboard the heavy cruiser USS Astoria (CA-34), where he was navigator.

He was promoted to commander in 1936 and assigned as executive officer of the Guam Naval Station and aide for civil administration. In 1938 he returned to battleship service as executive officer of the USS Pennsylvania (BB-38).

He became an aide to CNO Harold Stark in September 1940. He was naval secretary at the Arcadia Conference, and made a personal visit to deliver revised war plans to senior naval commanders in the Pacific.

He was promoted to captain in 1942, and was appointed President Franklin D. Roosevelt's naval aide. In that capacity, he established the White House Map Room, and accompanied Roosevelt to the January 1943 Casablanca Conference, and took notes. He took command of the newly commissioned battleship USS Iowa (BB-61); he was a plankowner. While he commanded her, February 22, 1943 to August 1944, Iowa transported President Roosevelt across the Atlantic to the Cairo Conference, and to Algeria en route to the Teheran Conference.

He was promoted to Rear Admiral August 6, 1944, and took command of Cruiser Division 3. He served under Admiral Frank Jack Fletcher in the Northern and Western Pacific, commanding Task Force 92 in attacks on the Kuriles. He was Deputy Chief of Naval Operations in 1946, Deputy CINCPACFLT in 1948, and Director, Personnel Policy Board from 1949. He commanded 1st Naval District, Boston, from February 1952 until he retired from the Navy in 1953.

== Post Navy ==
He was a vice president for client relations at John Hancock Life Insurance Company in Boston until he retired in 1966.
