= WJJS (FM) =

Radio station in Salem, Virginia

- Salem, Virginia; United States
- Broadcast area: Metro Roanoke
- Frequency: 93.5 MHz
- Branding: 93.5 & 102.7 JJS

Programming
- Language: English
- Format: Rhythmic top 40
- Affiliations: Premiere Networks

Ownership
- Owner: iHeartMedia, Inc.; (iHM Licenses, LLC)
- Sister stations: WJJX; WROV-FM; WSTV; WYYD

History
- First air date: March 7, 1969 (as WJLM)
- Former call signs: WJLM (1969–2002); WSNV (2002–2019)

Technical information
- Licensing authority: FCC
- Facility ID: 73956
- Class: A
- Power: 5,800 watts horizontal; 100,000 watts vertical
- HAAT: 30 meters (98 ft)
- Transmitter coordinates: 37°16′47.5″N 79°59′28.1″W

Links
- Public license information: Public file; LMS
- Webcast: Listen live (via iHeartRadio)
- Website: wjjs.iheart.com

WJJS (93.5 MHz) is a commercial FM radio station serving to Salem, Virginia. WJJS has a rhythmic top 40 radio format licensed to Salem, Virginia, and serving the Roanoke metropolitan area. The station is owned and operated by iHeartMedia, Inc. Programming is simulcast with co-owned 102.7 WJJX in Appomattox, Virginia, serving the Lynchburg metropolitan area. The studios and offices are on Old Forest Road in Lynchburg and its transmitter is located on Luckett Street near Shenandoah Ave in Roanoke.

Most shows on WJJS and WJJX are voicetracked, outside of FCC-mandated public affairs programming on Sundays. The only syndicated shows aired on the station are The Tino Cochino Show and The Bootleg Kev Show.

== History ==
The station launched on March 7, 1969, with the callsign WJLM and carried a country music format for 33 years, last branded as "J93.5, Today's Hot Country". Clear Channel purchased the station and at midnight on December 26, 2002, the format was flipped to adult contemporary, branded as "Sunny 93.5" and changed the callsign to WSNV.

Just after noon on March 10, 2005, WSNZ (102.7 FM) became a simulcast of WSNV and changed the branding to "93.5 Roanoke, 102.7 Lynchburg; Sunny FM". At noon on December 17, 2007, WSNZ swapped calls and formats with WJJX (101.7 FM). In March 2011, it was announced that WSNV would no longer be permitted to carry the station on more than one frequency due to broadcast laws. Therefore, at approximately 5:00 p.m. on March 25, 2011, WSNZ split from its simulcast with WSNV and began simulcasting WSFF (106.1 FM). In late 2012, WSNV shifted more towards a classic hits format, slightly changing the branding back to "Sunny 93.5; Hits of the 60's, 70s and 80s" as it did from December 26, 2002, to March 10, 2005. On August 25, 2014, the slogan changed to "70's and 80's Hits".

While the classic hits format was relatively successful, it did have quite a bit of overlap with sister station WSFF; combined with competition from rimshot simulcasters WHTU and WZZI, Sunny was not able to make more headway in the Roanoke market, and WSNV registered a 3.3 share in the Spring 2016 Nielsen Audio ratings, the last ratings book revealed during the format's run. As a result, following itsir Christmas music stint during the months of November and December, WSNV began stunting on December 27, 2016, with a "Wheel of Formats", running different format blocks that changed with every few songs (such as classic country, smooth jazz, urban contemporary, and even all-Elvis) and asking listeners to vote for a new format on the website of sister station WJJS (104.9 FM), with said new format debuting on January 3, 2017, at 10:00 a.m. At that time, after 10 hours of simulated construction sounds, the station flipped to hot adult contemporary as "Mix 93.5; Roanoke's Best Variety". The first song on Mix was "Shut Up and Dance" by Walk the Moon.

On May 1, 2019, WSNV changed its call letters to WJJS in anticipation of relocating the rhythmic top 40 format from 104.9 FM, which concurrently changed its call letters to WSTV as it prepared to inherit the "Steve FM" adult hits format from WSFF and WSNZ, which were being sold to the Educational Media Foundation. The frequency move was completed on May 30, 2019.
