= Washington Conference =

Washington Conference may refer to:

- Washington Conference on Theoretical Physics, a series of ten conferences on theoretical physics held from 1935 to 1947
- Washington Peace Conference, a meeting of representatives of all states still in the Union in an attempt to avert the American Civil War, 1861.
- Washington Naval Conference, a meeting between representatives of nine nations with interests in the Pacific; November 1921 and February 1922.
- U.S.–British Staff Conference (ABC–1), a series of secret discussions of American, British and Canadian (ABC) military coordination in the event of U.S. entry into World War II from January 29 to March 27, 1941
- First Washington Conference (code named ARCADIA), a meeting between U.S. President Franklin D. Roosevelt and British Prime Minister Winston Churchill from December 1941, to January 1942, to agree on war strategy.
- Second Washington Conference, a meeting between Roosevelt and Churchill in June 1942 that prioritised North African landings.
- Third Washington Conference (code named TRIDENT), a meeting between Roosevelt and Churchill in May 1943 to plan the Italian Campaign, the extent of military force, a date for invading Europe, and the war in Pacific.

== See also ==
- List of Allied World War II conferences
