= WMYK =

Radio station in Kokomo, Indiana

Coordinates: 40.629°N 86.042°W

Peru, Indiana; United States
- Broadcast area: Kokomo, Indiana; Marion, Indiana; Wabash, Indiana
- Frequency: 98.5 MHz
- Branding: Rock 98.5

Programming
- Format: Mainstream rock
- Affiliations: Compass Media Networks; United Stations Radio Networks; Indianapolis Colts Radio Network

Ownership
- Owner: Hoosier AM/FM LLC
- Operator: 3 Towers Broadcasting
- Sister stations: WIOU; WZWZ

History
- First air date: April 26, 1965 (first license granted, as WARU-FM)
- Former call signs: WARU-FM (1965–1979)

Technical information
- Licensing authority: FCC
- Facility ID: 71277
- Class: A
- ERP: 6,000 watts
- HAAT: 100 meters (330 ft)

Links
- Public license information: Public file; LMS
- Webcast: Listen live
- Website: www.rock985.com

WMYK (98.5 FM "Rock 98.5") is a mainstream rock radio station owned by Hoosier AM/FM LLC in Kokomo, Indiana. The station is located at the "Radio Ranch" on State Road 26 in Kokomo.

In July 2024, Hoosier AM/FM announced that it was selling its Kokomo stations—WMYK, WIOU, and WZWZ—to 3 Towers Broadcasting, with a local marketing agreement taking effect on August 1. As of May 2025, the stations were still owned by Hoosier AM/FM.
