= WBGV =

Coordinates: 43.286°N 82.971°W

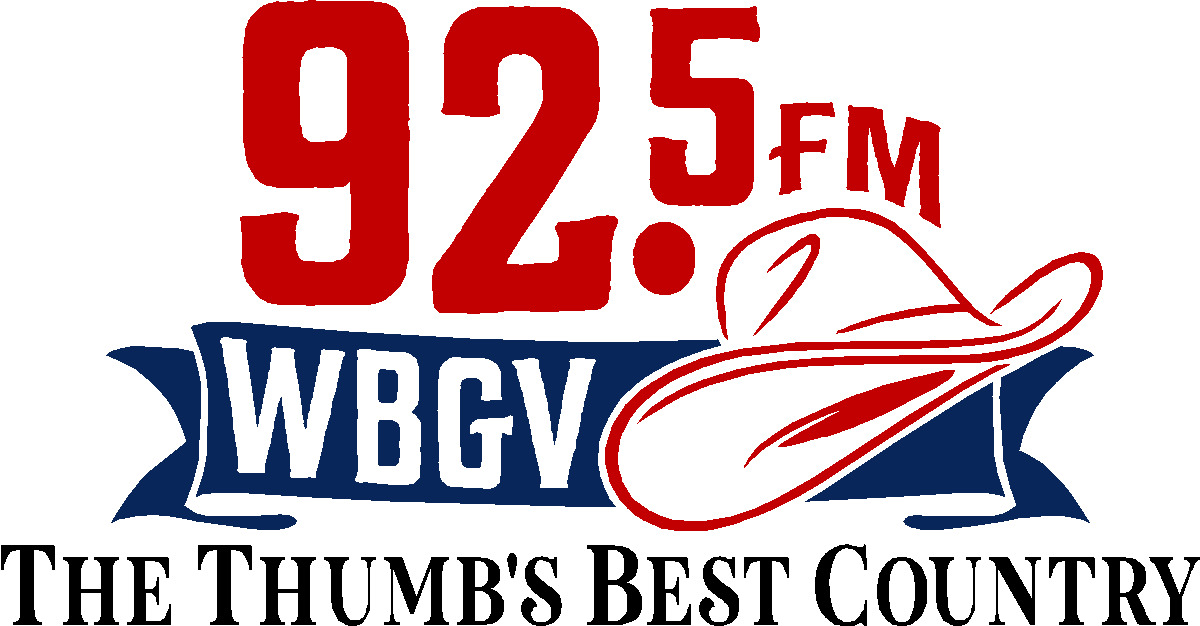
- Marlette, Michigan; United States
- Broadcast area: Blue Water Area, the Thumb
- Frequency: 92.5 MHz
- Branding: Country 92.5

Programming
- Format: Country

Ownership
- Owner: Sanilac/GB Broadcasting
- Sister stations: WMIC, WTGV-FM

History
- First air date: September 2, 1999
- Call sign meaning: Benko George V (the fifth), president of GB Broadcasting

Technical information
- Licensing authority: FCC
- Facility ID: 23435
- Class: A
- ERP: 3,000 watts
- HAAT: 100 meters

Links
- Public license information: Public file; LMS
- Website: www.sanilacbroadcasting.com

WBGV (92.5 FM, "Country 92.5") is a radio station broadcasting a country music format. Licensed to Marlette, Michigan, it first began broadcasting in 1999. It serves the central area of Michigan's Thumb, and parts of the Blue Water Area. It can be heard as far away as Port Huron, Lapeer, Romeo, and Bad Axe.

WBGV offers a wide range of modern country music. It is owned by G.B. Broadcasting. WBGV utilizes Westwood One's Mainstream Country format for the majority of its programming. Local news updates run weekdays at 7am, 8am, noon, and 5pm. The local news is produced by sister station WMIC in Sandusky. During the fall and winter months, high school football and basketball contests are broadcast weekly, and Detroit Lions coverage is heard when sister station WTGV is broadcasting Detroit Tigers games. WBGV offers one locally produced music program, On The Porch with Skinner, on Sunday afternoons, which primarily features traditional, outlaw, and red dirt country.

== Broadcast area ==
WBGV provides local coverage to the cities of Yale, Marlette, and Sandusky, as well as coverage to Croswell, Port Sanilac, and Lapeer. In the Thumb area WBGV is much stronger than competitor WSAQ.

== Sources ==
- Michiguide.com – WBGV History
- Sanilac Broadcasting – About us
