= WSTV =

Adult hits radio station in Roanoke, Virginia

- Roanoke, Virginia; United States
- Broadcast area: Metro Roanoke; New River Valley
- Frequency: 104.9 MHz (HD Radio)
- Branding: 104.9 Steve FM

Programming
- Format: Adult hits

Ownership
- Owner: iHeartMedia, Inc.; (iHM Licenses, LLC)
- Sister stations: WJJS; WJJX; WROV-FM; WYYD

History
- First air date: September 2, 1992
- Former call signs: WLUB (1992); WVRV (1992–1993); WRDJ (1993–2001); WMGR-FM (2001–2005); WZBL (2005–2007); WJJS (2007–2019)
- Call sign meaning: "Steve FM"

Technical information
- Licensing authority: FCC
- Facility ID: 64082
- Class: C2
- ERP: 14,500 watts
- HAAT: 282 meters (925 ft)
- Transmitter coordinates: 37°22′23.5″N 79°55′39.1″W
- Translator: HD2: 96.9 W245BG (Cave Spring)

Links
- Public license information: Public file; LMS
- Webcast: Listen live (via iHeartRadio)
- Website: stevefmvirginia.iheart.com

WSTV (104.9 FM) is a commercial radio station licensed to Roanoke, Virginia, United States, serving Metro Roanoke and the New River Valley. WSTV has an adult hits format. WSTV is owned and operated by iHeartMedia.

WSTV previously broadcast an alternative rock format on 104.9 HD2. The translator would later switch to a simulcast of WVTF's HD3 subchannel.

WSTV first began broadcasting on September 2, 1992. On May 1, 2019, the station changed its call letters to WSTV in anticipation of the adult hits-formatted "Steve FM" moving from WSFF (106.1 FM) and WSNZ (101.7 FM), which were in the process of being sold to Educational Media Foundation. Concurrently, the WJJS calls were moved to sister station WSNV in anticipation of the CHR format moving to the 93.5 frequency. The frequency move was completed on May 30, 2019.
