= WIOU (AM) =

Coordinates: 40°25′00″N 86°06′49″W

- WIOU Radio station
- Kokomo, Indiana; United States
- Frequency: 1350 kHz
- Branding: Fox Sports Radio 1350 WIOU

Programming
- Format: Silent
- Affiliations: Fox Sports Radio

Ownership
- Owner: Hoosier AM/FM LLC
- Operator: 3 Towers Broadcasting
- Sister stations: WMYK; WZWZ

History
- First air date: August 6, 1948; 78 years ago
- Last air date: May 31, 2025
- Call sign meaning: "I owe you" (the founders had to borrow money to finance the station's construction)

Technical information
- Licensing authority: FCC
- Facility ID: 41849
- Class: B
- Power: 5,000 watts days; 1,000 watts nights

Links
- Public license information: Public file; LMS
- Webcast: Listen live
- Website: www.1350amwiou.com

WIOU (1350 kHz) was a commercial AM radio station in Kokomo, Indiana. It was owned by Hoosier AM/FM LLC, with studios and offices on Indiana State Road 26 in Kokomo. It broadcast a sports radio format, mostly from Fox Sports Radio.

WIOU was powered at 5,000 watts by day and 1,000 watts at night, on 1350 AM. It has a directional antenna system using an in-line four-tower array, pushing a directional pattern north over Kokomo. The directional pattern was slightly different day and night.

== History ==
On August 6, 1948, WIOU first signed on the air. It was owned by North Central Indiana Broadcasting and featured programming from the CBS Radio Network. It was originally powered at 1,000 watts around the clock, but later got a daytime boost to 5,000 watts.

WIOU was established by Richard H. Blacklidge, William Naftzger, and John Carl Jefferies. Blacklidge was the CEO of the Kokomo Tribune newspaper at the time. Naftzger was a local attorney. Jefferies had been with radio station WKMO as general manager. The call letters, WIOU, were chosen by Naftzger's wife, Alma, since all were in debt to start the station. IOU stands for "I owe you".

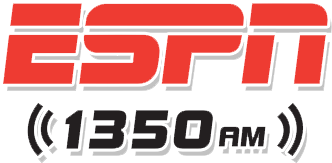
Former logo

On July 1, 2013, the station switched to a full-time sports format.

In July 2024, Hoosier AM/FM announced that it was selling its Kokomo stations—WIOU, WMYK, and WZWZ—to 3 Towers Broadcasting, with a local marketing agreement taking effect on August 1; as of May 2025, the stations were still owned by Hoosier AM/FM. On May 22, 2025, WIOU announced that it would close on May 31; its coverage of Kokomo High School sports will move to WZWZ. If you try to access www.1350amwiou.com now, it redirects you to The Score Indiana

== Sports teams ==
- Purdue University Basketball
- Indiana University Football and Basketball
- High School Football, Basketball, Baseball
- Network Indiana's Indiana Sports Talk with Bob Lovell

== Transmitter ==
The main transmitter was a Harris MW-5A (circa '78) utilizing a single forced air cooled metal/ceramic triode vacuum tube (type number 3CX2500F3) in the final RF amplifier stage and a single forced air cooled tetrode vacuum tube (type number 4CX3000A) as a pulse duration modulator (PDM). Due to the innovative design of this legacy rig, plate efficiency in the RF final amplifier stage is on the order of 92%. The antenna system consists of four quarter wave towers in a phased array aligned in a single row to achieve greatest signal to the North during daytime operation.
