= WMNA (AM) =

- Gretna, Virginia; United States
- Broadcast area: Southside Virginia; Pittsylvania County
- Frequency: 730 kHz
- Branding: VTRN Sports

Programming
- Format: Sports radio
- Affiliations: Westwood One Sports

Ownership
- Owner: 3 Daughters Media; (Burns Media Strategies)
- Sister stations: WBLT, WGMN, WMNA-FM, WVGM

History
- First air date: August 11, 1956

Technical information
- Licensing authority: FCC
- Facility ID: 65518
- Class: D
- Power: 1,000 watts (day); 28 watts (night)
- Transmitter coordinates: 36°55′31.0″N 79°19′50.0″W
- Translator: 104.3 W282CN (Gretna)

Links
- Public license information: Public file; LMS
- Webcast: Listen live
- Website: virginiatalkradionetwork.com

WMNA (730 AM) is a commercial radio station licensed to Gretna, Virginia, United States, serving Southside Virginia and Northern Pittsylvania County. It is owned and operated by 3 Daughters Media. WMNA has a sports format, simulcast with WVGM in Lynchburg.

WMNA's transmitter is located southeast of Gretna. Programming is also heard on 250-watt FM translator W282CN at 106.3 MHz.

== History ==
WMNA signed on the air on August 11, 1956. The station was originally a daytimer, required to go off the air at sunset. It was owned by the Central Virginia Broadcasting Company. Three years later, it added an FM station, WMNA-FM at 106.3 MHz.

The two stations simulcast for their first decades on the air. They had a full service, middle of the road (MOR) format of popular adult music, local news and sports. WMNA-AM-FM were network affiliates of the Mutual Broadcasting System.
