= WLLY (AM) =

- Wilson, North Carolina; United States
- Frequency: 1350 kHz

Programming
- Format: Southern Gospel

Ownership
- Owner: Estuardo Valdemar Rodriguez And Leonor Rodriguez, Jt Tenants

History
- First air date: 1961
- Call sign meaning: We Love Loving You

Technical information
- Licensing authority: FCC
- Facility ID: 20661
- Class: D
- Power: 1,000 watts day 79 watts night
- Transmitter coordinates: 35°43′24″N 77°55′16″W
- Translator: (107.5 MHz) W298CT (Wilson)

Links
- Public license information: Public file; LMS
- Webcast: Streaming MP3 via Streema
- Website: WLLYRadio.com

WLLY (1350 kHz) is a commercial AM radio station broadcasting a Southern Gospel music format in Wilson, North Carolina. The station is owned by Estuardo Valdemar Rodriguez and Leonor Rodriguez, Joint Tenants.

== History ==
WLLY signed on in 1961. It was originally owned by Epperson Stations, with Harry Epperson, Jr. as the principal owner. WLLY was, for most of its early history, a daytimer. To avoid interfering with other stations on AM 1350, it was required to go off the air at night. In the 1980s, it was given Federal Communications Commission permission to stay on the air around the clock, but at reduced power at night at 79 watts.

Up to the 1980s, it had a country music format and was an ABC Entertainment Network affiliate. By the 1990s, it had shifted to a Christian radio and Southern Gospel format.
