= WRWH =

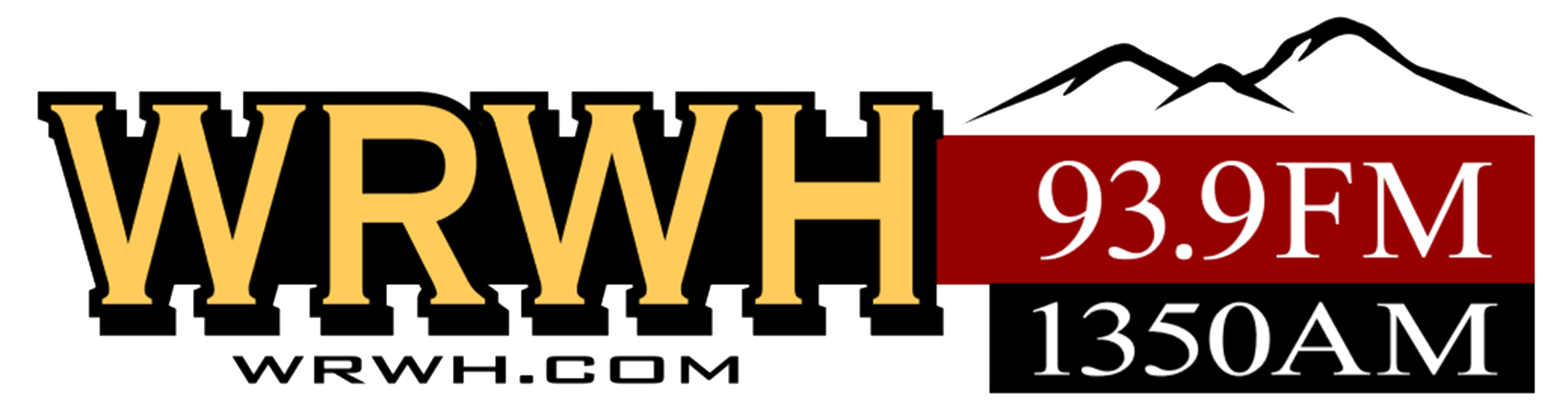
- Cleveland, Georgia; United States
- Frequency: 1350 kHz

Programming
- Format: Full-service (News Talk Information, oldies)
- Affiliations: Fox News Radio

Ownership
- Owner: White County Media, LLC.

Technical information
- Licensing authority: FCC
- Facility ID: 48761
- Class: D
- Power: 1,000 watts day 93 watts night
- Transmitter coordinates: 34°35′11.00″N 83°46′1.00″W
- Translators: W230CT (93.9 MHz, Cleveland)

Links
- Public license information: Public file; LMS
- Website: wrwh.com

WRWH (1350 AM) is a radio station broadcasting a full service format of News Talk Information and oldies. Licensed to Cleveland, Georgia, United States. The station is currently owned by White County Media, LLC. and features programming from Fox News Radio., Local high school sports, University of Georgia Bulldogs Sports, local community events, and music from the 1960s-1980s.
