= WYYD =

- Amherst, Virginia; United States
- Broadcast area: Lynchburg-Roanoke, Virginia
- Frequency: 107.9 MHz
- Branding: New Country 107-9 YYD

Programming
- Format: Country
- Affiliations: Premiere Networks; Performance Racing Network; Motor Racing Network

Ownership
- Owner: iHeartMedia; (iHM Licenses, LLC)
- Sister stations: WJJS; WROV-FM; WJJX; WSTV

History
- First air date: January 27, 1981
- Former call signs: WCNV (1981–1985)

Technical information
- Licensing authority: FCC
- Facility ID: 74282
- Class: C1
- ERP: 19,000 watts
- HAAT: 549 meters (1,801 ft)
- Transmitter coordinates: 37°28′19.5″N 79°22′27.1″W
- Repeater: 107.9 WYYD-FM1 (Roanoke)

Links
- Public license information: Public file; LMS
- Webcast: Listen live (via iHeartRadio)
- Website: newcountry1079.iheart.com

WYYD (107.9 MHz "New Country 107-9 YYD") is a commercial FM radio station licensed to Amherst, Virginia, and serving the Roanoke-Lynchburg media market. WYYD airs a country music radio format and is owned and operated by iHeartMedia. Monday through Saturday mornings, the station carries The Bobby Bones Show, based in Nashville and syndicated by Premiere Networks, an iHeart subsidiary. Overnight, it carries After Midnite with Granger Smith.

The studios and offices are on Old Forest Road in Lynchburg. The transmitter is near Sweet Hollow Road (County Route 615) in Big Island, Virginia. A 2,500 watt booster station, WYYD-FM1, is heard in Roanoke, also on 107.9 MHz.

== History ==
Always a country station, the station's first call sign was WCNV, which was assigned on January 16, 1981. It officially launched on January 27 with the branding "FM 108 WCNV". The station was co-owned with WAMV (1420 AM). WCNV was powered at only 4,100 watts, so it primarily served its own community and was not aimed at the larger Roanoke-Lynchburg market. It was owned by Central Virginia Media, Inc. which sold both stations to Winfas, Inc. in 1983.

WCNV switched its call sign to WYYD at midnight on November 18, 1985, and changed its branding to "108 WYYD; Today's Best Country and Your All-Time Favorites". The power had been increased to 20,500 watts on a 1,767-foot (539 m) tower, making it a regional country station for the larger Roanoke-Lynchburg market. In 1994, the station was sold to Benchmark Communications for $9 million and the studios were moved to Lynchburg.

In 1999, the station changed hands again, this time to Capstar Broadcasting, which later became AMFM Broadcasting, a forerunner to current owner, iHeartMedia. Just after 2000, the slogan was changed to "Virginia's Best Country".

On September 3, 2010, WYYD changed its branding to "Country 107-9 WYYD; The Widest Variety of Country Music". It played a mix of mainstream and classic country. On the morning on September 16, 2013, WYYD changed its branding again to "New Country 107-9 YYD."
