= Flynn Township, Michigan =

- Township
- Location within the state of Michigan Flynn Township, Michigan (the United States)
- Coordinates: 43°17′16″N 82°55′33″W
- Country: United States
- State: Michigan
- County: Sanilac
- Established: 1869

Government
  - Type: Civil Township
  - Supervisor: Grant Burgess
  - Clerk: Katherine Wilson
  - Treasurer: Tracy Holbrook

Area
  - Total: 35.8 sq mi (92.6 km^{2})
  - Land: 35.8 sq mi (92.6 km^{2})
  - Water: 0 sq mi (0.0 km^{2})
- Elevation: 781 ft (238 m)

Population (2020)
  - Total: 1,013
  - Density: 28/sq mi (10.9/km^{2})
- Time zone: UTC-5 (Eastern (EST))
  - Summer (DST): UTC-4 (EDT)
- ZIP codes: 48453 (Marlette), 48416 (Brown City)
- FIPS code: 26-29240
- GNIS feature ID: 1626291
- Website: http://flynntownship.org/

Flynn Township is a civil township of Sanilac County in the U.S. state of Michigan. The population was 1,013 at the 2020 census.

Board meetings are held on the second Tuesday of each month at 8:00 PM (Eastern Time Zone) at the Flynn Township Senior Center, 5251 Shephard Road Brown City, MI 48416.

== Communities ==
There are no incorporated municipalities in the township.

- Marlette is a city located to the northwest and the Marlette ZIP code 48453 serves northern and western portions of the township.
- Brown City is a city located to the south and the Brown City ZIP code 48416 serves southern and eastern portions of the township.
- Omard is an unincorporated area located at the northwestern corner of section 36. A post office was built in 1871 but went out of operation in 1904 after the introduction of the RFD. The first community meetings were held at the schoolhouse formerly located at the southeasternmost corner of section 26.

== Geography ==
According to the United States Census Bureau, the township has a total area of 35.8 square miles (93 km^{2}), all land.

== Demographics ==
Historical population
Census	Pop.	Note	%±
2000	1,040		—
2010	1,050		1.0%
2020	1,013		−3.5%

As of the census of 2000, there were 1,040 people, 333 households, and 267 families residing in the township. The population density was 29.1 inhabitants per square mile (11.2/km^{2}). There were 367 housing units at an average density of 10.3 per square mile (4.0/km^{2}). The racial makeup of the township was 99.62% White, 0.10% Native American, 0.19% from other races, and 0.10% from two or more races. Hispanic or Latino of any race were 1.44% of the population.

There were 333 households, out of which 38.7% had children under the age of 18 living with them, 68.5% were married couples living together, 7.8% had a female householder with no husband present, and 19.8% were non-families. 16.5% of all households were made up of individuals, and 5.4% had someone living alone who was 65 years of age or older. The average household size was 3.11 and the average family size was 3.51.

In the township the population was spread out, with 32.9% under the age of 18, 10.5% from 18 to 24, 25.1% from 25 to 44, 21.4% from 45 to 64, and 10.1% who were 65 years of age or older. The median age was 31 years. For every 100 females, there were 105.9 males. For every 100 females age 18 and over, there were 101.7 males.

The median income for a household in the township was $40,850, and the median income for a family was $42,083. Males had a median income of $33,125 versus $21,875 for females. The per capita income for the township was $14,026. About 12.3% of families and 17.4% of the population were below the poverty line, including 25.6% of those under age 18 and 5.0% of those age 65 or over.
