= Radio Buenos Aires =

Radio station in Buenos Aires, Argentina

Radio Buenos Aires (LS 6)
Buenos Aires, Argentina; Argentina
- Frequency: Gran Buenos Aires: 1350 AM

Programming
- Format: News/talk, Christian

Ownership
- Owner: Universal Church of the Kingdom of God

Links
- Website: radiobuenosaires.com.ar

Radio Buenos Aires (call sign LS 6) is an Argentinian radio station that broadcasts from Buenos Aires.

== History ==
It began broadcasting from 270 Belgrano Avenue, under the license that belonged to Radio Del Pueblo (formerly Radio América, Radio Bijou, Radio La Abuelita and Radio Bernotti), awarded then by the State to the company Radiodifusora Esmeralda S.A.

In 1994, the station moved its operations to the building it occupies today. In 1999, it was acquired by its current owner, through the purchase of the aforementioned licensee company.

Previous presenters have included Félix Musso Barrera, Raúl Urtizberea, Riverito, Oscar Otranto, Silvio Soldán, Virginia Hanglin, Jorge Bocacci, Ariel Delgado, María Isabel Sánchez, Luis Jorge Nadaf, Lionel Godoy, Eduardo Aliverti, Edgardo Mesa and Enrique Vázquez, among others.

== Radio shows ==
Its program lineup is composed of programs from the Universal Church of the Kingdom of God and secular programs (journalistic, magazine and musical shows).

It also has its own news flash service (Buenos Aires Informa) and programmed music segments.
