= WGDN-FM =

Coordinates: 43.954°N 84.549°W

- Gladwin, Michigan; United States
- Broadcast area
- Frequency: 103.1 MHz
- Branding: 103 Country

Programming
- Format: Country
- Affiliations: WGDN

Ownership
- Owner: Apple Broadcasting Company

History
- First air date: February 7, 1979
- Former call signs: WGMM (6/1/78-2/9/87)
- Call sign meaning: GlaDwiN, Michigan

Technical information
- Licensing authority: FCC
- Facility ID: 2484
- Class: C3
- ERP: 11,500 watts
- HAAT: 148 meters (486 ft)

Links
- Public license information: Public file; LMS
- Webcast: Listen Live
- Website: 103country.com

WGDN-FM (103.1 FM, 103 Country) is an American radio station broadcasting a country music format in Gladwin, Michigan owned by Apple Broadcasting Company.

== History ==
=== Beginnings ===
Licensed to Gladwin, Michigan, it first began broadcasting on February 7, 1979 under the call sign WGMM, which stood for "Gladwin's Music Machine".

The station's original format was adult contemporary music, which continued until the switch to country in the early 1990s (well after the calls changed to WGDN-FM).

For more on this station's early history, see WGDN (AM).

WGDN-FM's coverage area includes the Gladwin, Mount Pleasant, Clare, Standish, West Branch and Houghton Lake areas, with a listenable signal westward to Big Rapids and east to Bay City.

=== WGDN-FM Today ===
WGDN - popularly referred to as 103Country. The name says it all: 103 Country: The location on the FM dial and the style of music. 103.1 FM features classic country programming on weekends, and Country gospel music on Sundays from Noon till 4 pm. The station reaches most of 17 central Michigan counties. 24 hours per day. Apple Broadcasting Company, Inc also operates 1350 AM and 96.5 FM (The Northern Light). This station is a mixture of Southern Gospel / Country Gospel and 1980's Contemporary Christian music. Primary service area is Gladwin and Ogemaw Counties.
