= WHIP (AM) =

- Mooresville, North Carolina; United States
- Frequency: 1350 kHz
- Branding: WHIP 1350

Programming
- Format: Oldies
- Affiliations: Compass Media Networks; Premiere Networks

Ownership
- Owner: Mooresville Media, Inc.

History
- First air date: 1950

Technical information
- Licensing authority: FCC
- Facility ID: 43740
- Class: D
- Power: 1,000 watts day 67 watts night
- Transmitter coordinates: 35°36′4.00″N 80°48′51.00″W
- Translator: 99.3 W257EJ (Mooresville)

Links
- Public license information: Public file; LMS
- Webcast: Listen Live
- Website: 1350whip.com

WHIP (1350 kHz) is an AM radio station broadcasting an oldies radio format. It is licensed in Mooresville, North Carolina, United States. The station is currently owned by Mooresville Media, Inc. WHIP has been serving Mooresville, North Carolina and Iredell County since 1950. It has been owned and operated by Glenn and Martha Hamrick since 1976. WHIP also broadcasts Davidson Wildcats basketball and football games.

As of 2019, WHIP is also heard on W257EJ at 99.3 FM.

Former logo
