= Burlington Township, Lapeer County, Michigan =

Burlington Township, Michigan
- Civil township
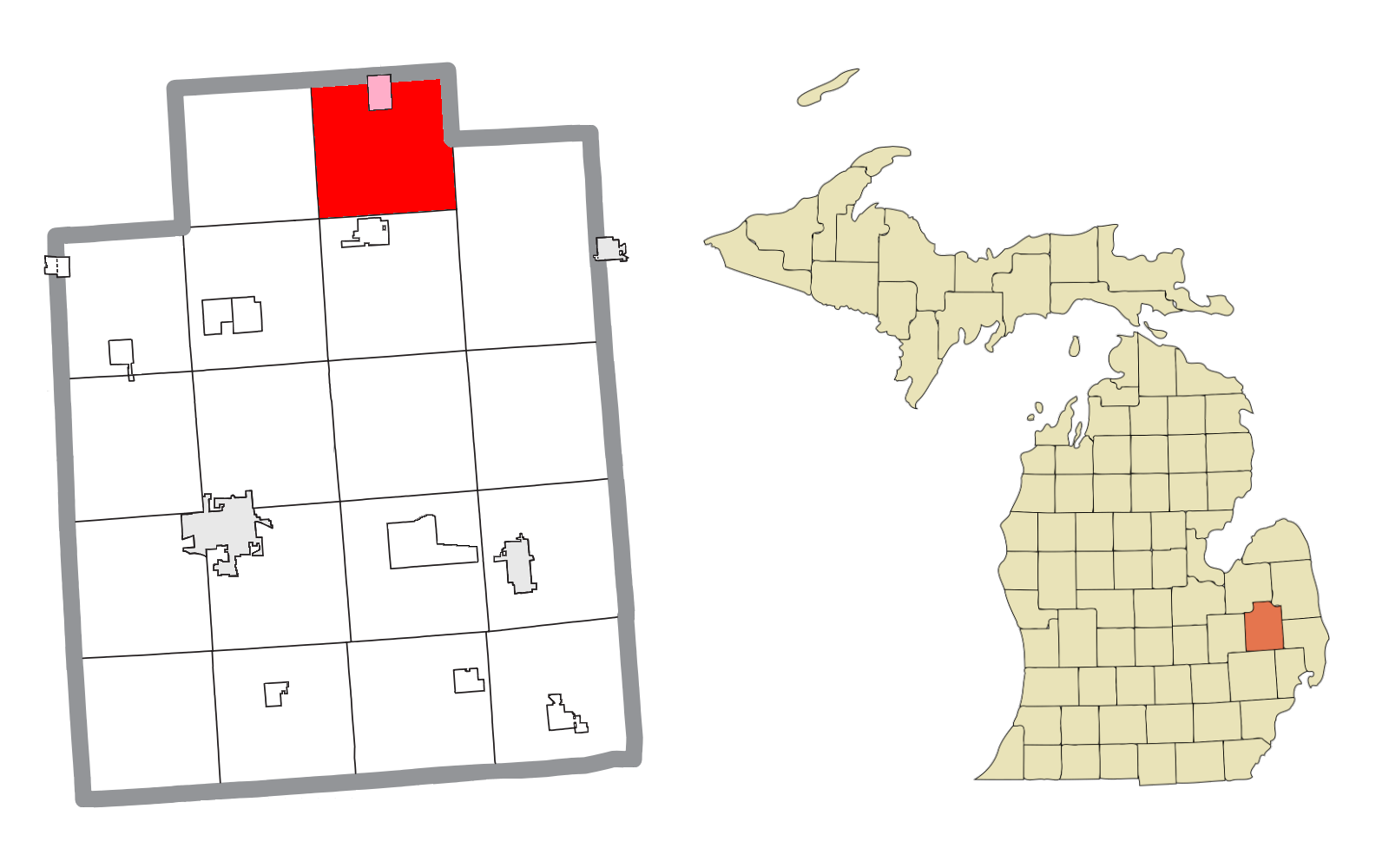
- Location within Lapeer County (red) and the administered village of Clifford (pink)

- Location within the state of Michigan Location within the United States
- Coordinates: 43°18′00″N 83°11′29″W
- Country: United States
- State: Michigan
- County: Lapeer

Area
  - Total: 35.6 sq mi (92.2 km^{2})
  - Land: 35.6 sq mi (92.2 km^{2})
  - Water: 0 sq mi (0.0 km^{2})
- Elevation: 837 ft (255 m)

Population (2020)
  - Total: 1,414
  - Density: 39.7/sq mi (15.3/km^{2})
- Time zone: UTC-5 (Eastern (EST))
  - Summer (DST): UTC-4 (EDT)
- FIPS code: 26-11840
- GNIS feature ID: 1626005
- Website: http://www.burlingtontwp.com/

Burlington Township is a civil township of Lapeer County in the U.S. state of Michigan. The population was 1,414 at the 2020 Census.

== Geography ==
According to the United States Census Bureau, the township has a total area of 35.6 square miles (92 km^{2}), of which 35.6 square miles (92 km^{2}) is land and 0.04 square miles (0.10 km^{2}) (0.06%) is water.

== Demographics ==
As of the census of 2000, there were 1,402 people, 508 households, and 381 families residing in the township. The population density was 39.4 inhabitants per square mile (15.2/km^{2}). There were 546 housing units at an average density of 15.3 per square mile (5.9/km^{2}). The racial makeup of the township was 97.36% White, 0.14% African American, 0.50% Native American, 0.29% Asian, 0.64% from other races, and 1.07% from two or more races. Hispanic or Latino of any race were 2.07% of the population.

There were 508 households, out of which 37.0% had children under the age of 18 living with them, 62.2% were married couples living together, 8.5% had a female householder with no husband present, and 25.0% were non-families. 19.9% of all households were made up of individuals, and 7.9% had someone living alone who was 65 years of age or older. The average household size was 2.76 and the average family size was 3.19.

In the township the population was spread out, with 27.5% under the age of 18, 7.5% from 18 to 24, 32.0% from 25 to 44, 23.2% from 45 to 64, and 9.8% who were 65 years of age or older. The median age was 36 years. For every 100 females, there were 99.7 males. For every 100 females age 18 and over, there were 96.9 males.

The median income for a household in the township was $42,794, and the median income for a family was $49,342. Males had a median income of $34,792 versus $22,560 for females. The per capita income for the township was $17,108. About 6.1% of families and 8.8% of the population were below the poverty line, including 10.5% of those under age 18 and 12.0% of those age 65 or over.
