= WMIC =

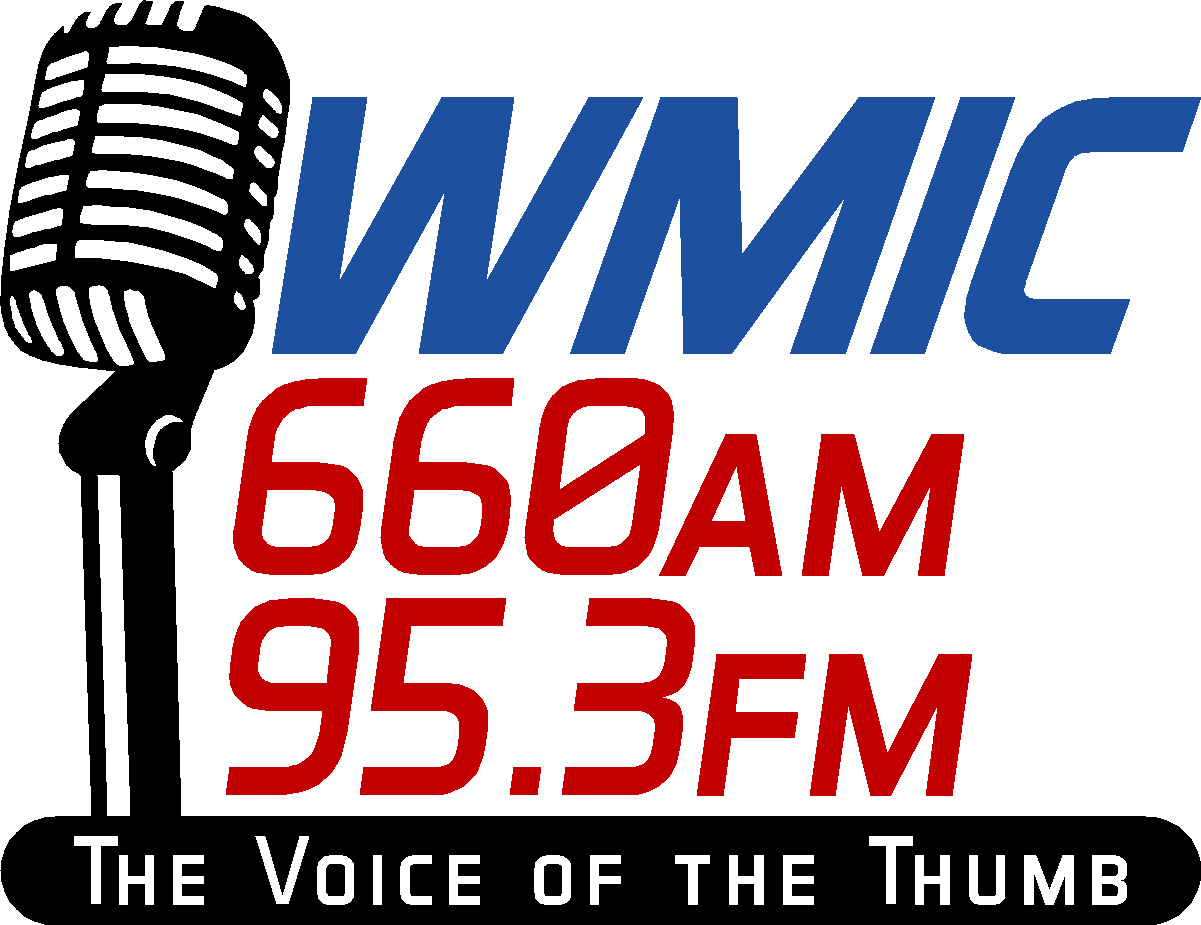
- Sandusky, Michigan; United States
- Frequency: 660 kHz
- Branding: WMIC 660 AM

Programming
- Format: Full service radio atation - news talk and country music
- Affiliations: ABC News Radio; Genesis Communications Network; USA Radio Network; Westwood One; Michigan Farm Radio Network

Ownership
- Owner: Sanilac/GB Broadcasting
- Sister stations: WBGV, WTGV

History
- First air date: June 27, 1968
- Former frequencies: 1560 kHz
- Call sign meaning: Wireless MICrophone

Technical information
- Licensing authority: FCC
- Facility ID: 59026
- Class: D
- Power: 1,000 watts day
- Transmitter coordinates: 43°23′34″N 82°50′06″W
- Translator: 95.3 W237EQ (Sandusky)

Links
- Public license information: Public file; LMS
- Webcast: Listen Live
- Website: sanilacbroadcasting.com

WMIC (660 AM) is a full service radio station licensed to Sandusky, Michigan with a power output of 1,000 watts. WMIC covers Sanilac County, Michigan and The Thumb area of Michigan. The station is owned by Sanilac/GB Broadcasting and broadcasts from studios on Elk Street in Downtown Sandusky, along with sister stations WTGV and WBGV. Its programming is also simulcasted on FM Translator W237EQ, also licensed to Sandusky at 95.3 MHz, with an effective radiated power of 250 watts.

WMIC's transmitter and translator are co-located south of Sandusky off Cooper Road Road in Sanilac County. WMIC provides a strong signal to both eastern Michigan and western Ontario due to its low dial position and corresponding long wavelength. On clear weather days, the station can be heard as far away as Roscommon, Ann Arbor, and Lansing. The AM station, however, must sign off at sunset to protect WFAN New York City, a 50,000 watt clear channel radio station. 95.3 FM is allowed to continue broadcasting after the parent station signs off during nighttime hours due to FCC rules with regard to translators.

== History ==
WMIC was first granted a construction permit to operate at 1560 kHz on May 10, 1965, and at 1000 watts maximum power. The station was authorized to operate only from sunrise to sunset, protecting WQXR. Transmitter facilities were constructed along Cooper Road near M-19, about a mile and a half south of Sandusky. Shortly before sign-on, the station set up studios at 19 South Elk Street in downtown Sandusky.

The call letters were assigned that October. Unforeseen delays resulted in extensions being granted, pushing its actual sign-on date to 1968. Prior to sign-on, the station was granted pre-sunrise authority of 500 watts, which allowed it to sign on two hours before local sunrise, keeping its sign-on time consistent to 6:00 am daily. The call letters were previously used by a now defunct radio station in St. Helen, Michigan.

In 1969, George Benko, a Croswell resident, bought into Sanilac Broadcasting Company. He and his family still control the station today.

In 1971, WMIC-FM signed on the air, giving Sandusky radio listeners local service after sunset, but this would change six years later, when both entities would separate programming and WMIC-FM would become WTGV.

Former logo

In 1987, WMIC moved to the stronger dial position of 660 kHz, but retained its same power values and daytime-only status.

In 2021, Sanilac Broadcasting added FM Translator W237EQ 95.3 FM. The addition of this translator allows WMIC to have 24-hour programming for the first time. 95.3 FM is not affected by WFAN New York, and Federal Communications Commission rules allow FM Translators to continue to broadcast, even if their parent station is of daytime only status.

== Programming ==
WMIC features a full service radio station that consists of both local news and programming, as well as syndicated news talk programs weekday afternoons. The station also airs a classic country program weekday mornings from 9:00 a.m. to noon, as well as a popular long-running polka program on weekend afternoons.

- Eddie Fury, who spent much of his career at Thumb area competitor WLEW-FM, hosts "The Morning Fury" weekdays 6:00 to 9:00 a.m.
- A country classics show airs weekdays from 9:00 a.m. to noon. Longtime station personality Paul Osentoski hosted this program from 1995 until his retirement from full-time duty in 2018; as of September 2025, Sean Cantwell is the current host.
- Local news and information blocks air weekdays at noon and 5:00 p.m.
- "Swap Shop" a popular buy, sell, and trading show airs from 1:00 to 2:00 p.m. weekdays, and at 8:30 a.m. on Saturdays.
- Vince Coglianese is heard weekday afternoons on tape-delay from 2 to 5 pm, his show airs live nationwide from noon to 3 pm. His show replaced a program hosted by Dan Bongino, which took the place of Rush Limbaugh, who was heard in the same time slot on the station for over three decades.
- Various local specialty shows are heard weekdays between 5:30 and 7:00 pm, including Happy Hour (sports and pop culture) on Mondays and Fridays, Thumb Sportsline (high school sports) on Tuesdays, Thumbing Through The Archives (local history and true crime) on Wednesdays, and Skinner's Suitcase Full of Blues on Thursdays.
- Additional talk shows including The Jesse Kelly Show and Caravan to Midnight hosted by John B. Wells are heard evenings. As of March 2026, Coast to Coast AM airs during overnights.
- On the weekends, the station carries Outdoor Magazine with Mike Avery, Art Bell: Somewhere In Time, and syndicated programs hosted by Ben Ferguson and Bill Cunningham.
- A Polka music show, hosted by longtime WJR news reporter Ken Rogulski, is heard on weekend afternoons. This program was hosted by Paul Osentoski, a member of the Michigan Polka Hall of Fame, until he died in March 2024.
- Staff list includes reporter and General Manager Bob Armstrong, Operations Manager Nick Lien, Program Director and Morning Show Host Eddie Fury, and News Director Arica Frisbey.

Being a full service radio station, WMIC finds itself in competition with many area radio stations for listeners, including co-owned WBGV which has a 24 hour country format.
