= Second Washington Conference =

The Second Washington Conference (19 – 25 June 1942), did not have a code name because it was hastily called and was regarded at the time as a set of military staff conversations rather than a formal conference. The two delegations were led by the British Prime Minister Winston Churchill and the American President Franklin D. Roosevelt.

Immediately before the Conference started, Roosevelt held preparatory talks with Churchill in his home town of Hyde Park, New York on 19 and 20 June.

Roosevelt about the meeting at Hyde Park. "Churchill saw all those boats from the last war tied up on the Hudson river and in one of his great bursts of imagination he said "By George, we could take those ships and others like them that are good for nothing and sink them offshore to protect the landings" I thought well of it and we talked about it all afternoon. The Military and Naval authorities were startled out of a year's growth. But Winnie was right. Great fellow, that Churchill, if you can keep up with him". So started the idea of the Mulberry Harbour.

The conference discussed how the Western Allies could best aid the Soviet Union. The Americans were keen to open up a Second Front in France, but the British did not think that it was yet a feasible option and Churchill proposed developing a joint campaign in the Mediterranean Theater leading to an attack on Italy as the "soft under-belly" of the Axis. Agreement was reached to start preparations for an invasion of the North African Colonies of Vichy France (Operation Torch). One of the first concrete measures taken by Roosevelt to facilitate this strategy was to appoint General Dwight D. Eisenhower as the Commander-in-Chief of U.S. Forces in the European Theater of Operations on 25 June.

Roosevelt and Churchill also held discussions with members of the Pacific War Council, King Peter II of Yugoslavia and his Foreign Minister, and with Soviet and Chinese representatives, with whom they discussed strategic problems.

== See also ==
- Washington Conference
- List of Allied World War II conferences
