= WVGM =

- Lynchburg, Virginia; United States
- Broadcast area: Lynchburg metropolitan area
- Frequency: 1320 kHz
- Branding: VTRN Sports

Programming
- Format: Sports radio
- Affiliations: Westwood One Sports; VSiN Radio

Ownership
- Owner: 3 Daughters Media, Inc.
- Sister stations: WBLT; WGMN; WMNA; WMNA-FM

History
- First air date: February 22, 1962
- Former call signs: WDMS (1962–1968); WLGM (1968–1986); WJJS (1986–1992, 1996–1998); WXYU (1992–1993); WVLR (1993–1996)
- Call sign meaning: Virginia's Game (former branding)

Technical information
- Licensing authority: FCC
- Facility ID: 70330
- Class: D
- Power: 1,000 watts (day); 24 watts (night)
- Transmitter coordinates: 37°25′37.5″N 79°7′25.1″W

Links
- Public license information: Public file; LMS
- Webcast: Listen live
- Website: virginiatalkradionetwork.com

WVGM (1320 AM) is a commercial radio station licensed to Lynchburg, Virginia, United States. It broadcasts a sports format and is owned and operated by 3 Daughters Media. Most programming comes from Westwood One Sports with some programming from the Vegas Stats & Information Network.

Programming is also heard on 250-watt FM translator W227BG at 93.3 MHz.

== History ==
The station signed on the air on February 22, 1962, as WDMS. It was originally a daytimer, required to go off the air at night. In the 1970s, the station was Top 40 outlet WLGM. It played the current hits and was an affiliate of the ABC Entertainment Network.

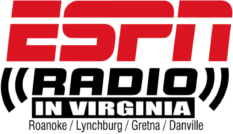
Previous logo used during station's affiliation with ESPN Radio

3 Daughters Media bought WVGM and WGMN from Clear Channel Communications in a deal announced late in 2006.
