= WJJX =

Radio station in Appomattox, Virginia

- Appomattox, Virginia; United States
- Broadcast area: Lynchburg, Virginia; Southside of Virginia
- Frequency: 102.7 MHz
- Branding: 93.5 & 102.7 JJS

Programming
- Language: English
- Format: Rhythmic top 40
- Affiliations: Premiere Networks

Ownership
- Owner: iHeartMedia, Inc.; (iHM Licenses, LLC)
- Sister stations: WJJS; WROV-FM; WYYD; WSTV

History
- First air date: May 17, 1989
- Former call signs: WZST (1989–1992); WVLR (1992–1993); WLDJ (1993–2001); WMJA (2001–2005); WSNZ (2005–2007)

Technical information
- Licensing authority: FCC
- Facility ID: 36094
- Class: B
- ERP: 22,000 watts
- HAAT: 227 meters (745 ft)
- Transmitter coordinates: 37°28′7.5″N 79°0′26″W

Links
- Public license information: Public file; LMS
- Webcast: Listen live (via iHeartRadio)
- Website: wjjs.iheart.com

WJJX (102.7 FM) is a commercial radio station licensed to Appomattox, Virginia, and serving the Lynchburg metropolitan area and the Southside. WJJX has a rhythmic Top 40 radio format and is owned by iHeartMedia, Inc. Programming is simulcast with co-owned WJJS in Salem, Virginia, serving the Roanoke metropolitan area. The radio studios and offices are on Old Forest Road in Lynchburg and its transmitter is off Round Mountain Road in Madison Heights, Virginia.

Most shows on WJJS and WJJX are voicetracked, outside of FCC-mandated public affairs programming on Sundays. The only syndicated shows aired on the station are The Tino Cochino Show and The Bootleg Kev Show.
