= WLRX (FM) =

- Vinton, Virginia; United States
- Broadcast area: Roanoke metropolitan area
- Frequency: 106.1 MHz (HD Radio)

Programming
- Format: Contemporary Christian music
- Network: K-Love

Ownership
- Owner: Educational Media Foundation

History
- First air date: 1994
- Former call signs: WWFO (1991–1994, CP); WJJS (1994–1996); WJJS-FM (1996–2007); WZBL (2007–2009); WSFF (2009–2019)

Technical information
- Licensing authority: FCC
- Facility ID: 41635
- Class: A
- ERP: 6,000 watts
- HAAT: 29 meters (95 ft)
- Transmitter coordinates: 37°17′3.5″N 79°59′13.1″W

Links
- Public license information: Public file; LMS
- Webcast: Listen live
- Website: www.klove.com

WLRX (106.1 FM) is a radio station licensed to Vinton, Virginia, United States, It transmits K-Love, a national contemporary Christian music network, to the Roanoke area and is owned by the Educational Media Foundation (EMF).

This station began broadcasting in 1994 and in its entire history until being sold to EMF in 2019 was used in a simulcast capacity with stations in Lynchburg. It was originally owned by Michael Scott Copeland but was leased by Virginia Network, owner of urban contemporary–formatted WJJS (101.7 FM) in Lynchburg, to extend its signal into the Roanoke area. The pair were known as WJJS and WJJX between 1996 and 2007.

The simulcast of WJJS and WJJX was broken up between 2007 and 2011, at a time when then-owner Clear Channel Communications was forced to put some of its stations in a divestiture trust. During that time, the 106.1 frequency became a classic country–formatted station, WZBL "The Bull". The Bull was dropped in 2009, when Clear Channel—later known as iHeartMedia—relaunched 106.1 as an adult hits station, WSFF "Steve FM". In 2019, the two stations were sold out of the trust to the Educational Media Foundation and integrated into its national Christian music networks.

== History ==
=== As a commercial station ===
In May 1990, the Federal Communications Commission (FCC) designated for comparative hearing the applications of Michael Scott Copeland and four other groups seeking to a build a radio station broadcasting on 106.1 MHz from Vinton, Virginia. Copeland's application, which was filed in April 1988, was granted on November 8 of that year.

Copeland still owned the station, with the call sign WWFO, by 1994, but it was unbuilt. Virginia Network, the owner of WJJS (101.7 FM) in Lynchburg, sought to rebroadcast that station into the Roanoke area and reached a deal to lease WWFO from Copeland. The new station would be built on the tower shared with Virginia Network's Roanoke-market WLDJ. WJJS was on the air by May 1994. The two stations broadcast as "Jammin' 106 and Jammin' 101.7".

Cavalier Communications bought the Virginia Network cluster in 1996. The WJJS–WJJX pair were the second-most-listened-to station in the Roanoke–Lynchburg market when Capstar Broadcasting Partners acquired the Cavalier cluster in 1997. Capstar merged with Chancellor Broadcasting to form AMFM in 1998, and Clear Channel Communications acquired AMFM in 1999.

Between 2007 and 2011, Clear Channel broke up the pairing of 106.1 and 101.7. At noon on December 17, 2007, it moved the WJJS format to 104.9 MHz in Roanoke and 102.7 MHz in Lynchburg. In turn, 106.1 took on WZBL's classic country format, known as The Bull, and call sign. 106.1 MHz flipped to adult hits as WSFF "Steve FM" at noon on March 27, 2009. At 5:00PM on March 25, 2011, 106.1 was re-paired with 101.7, then known as WSNZ.

=== EMF ownership ===
Though Clear Channel, later known as iHeartMedia, had been operating the 106.1 Roanoke and 101.7 Lynchburg facilities, it had not owned them since 2008, when Clear Channel was taken private. That required the placement of the facilities into a trust, the Aloha Station Trust, for eventual divestiture. The trust configuration had already been determined when the simulcast changes of 2007 occurred. After 11 years, iHeart announced a divestiture proposal for four of the stations in the trust, including WSNZ and WSFF. They were traded to the Educational Media Foundation, owner of the national K-Love and Air1 networks, along with stations in Georgia and Ohio in exchange for six translators that iHeart programmed but EMF owned.

On May 30, the Steve format moved to 104.9 MHz as WSTV. EMF closed on the acquisition the next day and changed WSFF's call sign to WLRX.
