= WTGV-FM =

Coordinates: 43.393°N 82.835°W

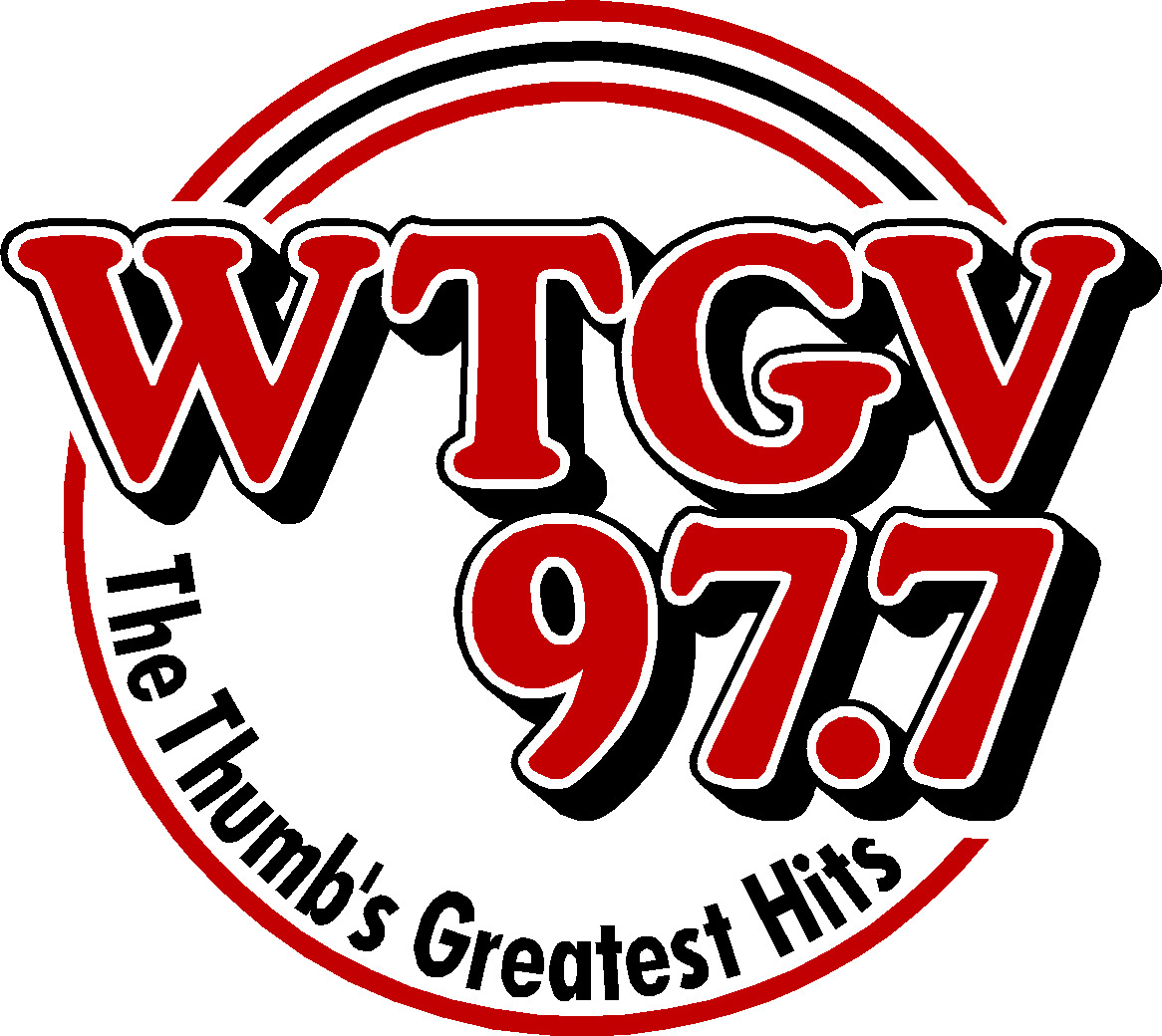
- Sandusky, Michigan; United States
- Frequency: 97.7 MHz
- Branding: 97.7 WTGV, The Thumb's Greatest Hits

Programming
- Format: Classic hits
- Affiliations: ABC News Radio

Ownership
- Owner: Sanilac/GB Broadcasting
- Sister stations: WMIC, WBGV

History
- First air date: August 17, 1971 (as WMIC-FM)
- Former call signs: WMIC-FM (1971-8/13/79)
- Call sign meaning: The Thumb's Great Voice

Technical information
- Licensing authority: FCC
- Facility ID: 59027
- Class: A
- ERP: 3,000 watts
- HAAT: 99 meters (325 ft)

Links
- Public license information: Public file; LMS
- Webcast: Listen Live
- Website: sanilacbroadcasting.com

WTGV-FM (97.7 MHz) is a radio station broadcasting a classic hits format, serving Sandusky and the Thumb and Blue Water area of Michigan. WTGV is owned and operated by Sanilac Broadcasting.

== Programming ==
WTGV features a rock-based Classic Hits format consisting of rock and alternative hits from the 1970s, 80s, and 90s. Local programming includes The Morning Fury with Program Director Eddie Fury in mornings, Nick Lien in middays, Happy Hour with Sean Cantwell and Adam Harahuc in afternoons, a program devoted to local music (Sessions) in evenings, and the syndicated Alice's Attic in late nights. Weekends feature several locally-produced specialty shows, including a hard rock/metal program (The Saturday Night School of Rock), a blues show (Skinner's Suitcase Full of Blues), a program devoted to 90's and 2000's alternative rock (The Garage), an Irish music show (The Blarney Hour), and an extended version of Sessions on Sunday nights. The station also features ABC News at the top of each hour, local news and weather, and play-by-play coverage of the Detroit Tigers, Detroit Lions, and local high school teams.

== History ==
The station began broadcasting in 1971 under the WMIC-FM call sign, simulcasting WMIC-AM 1560 (now 660). WMIC-FM separated programming in 1977, switching to a beautiful music format, and adopted the WTGV ("Thumb's Great Voice") call sign two years later. The beautiful music format was updated to a MOR music mix over the years, and then to mainstream adult contemporary by 2000 until the station changed formats in 2017.

== Sources ==
- Sanilac Broadcasting - WMIC-AM/WTGV-FM/WBGV-FM
- Michiguide.com - WTGV-FM History
