= WGMN =

- Roanoke, Virginia; United States
- Frequency: 1240 kHz
- Branding: WNRN

Programming
- Format: Adult album alternative

Ownership
- Owner: Stu-Comm, Inc.

History
- First air date: 1946
- Former call signs: WROV (1946–1998)
- Call sign meaning: Game Network (former sports branding)

Technical information
- Licensing authority: FCC
- Facility ID: 37746
- Class: C
- Power: 1,000 watts
- Transmitter coordinates: 37°16′12.5″N 79°58′13.1″W
- Translator: 99.5 W258DN (Roanoke)

Links
- Public license information: Public file; LMS
- Website: www.wnrn.org

WGMN (1240 AM) is a commercial radio station licensed to Roanoke, Virginia, United States. Owned and operated by the non-profit Stu-Comm, Inc., it broadcasts an adult album alternative format as a simulcast of Charlottesville-based WNRN-FM.

WGMN's transmitter is sited on Cleveland Avenue SW near the Roanoke River. Programming is also heard on low-power FM translator 99.5 W258DN in Roanoke.

== History ==
The station signed on the air in 1946 as WROV, standing for Roanoke, Virginia. The station was a network affiliate of the Mutual Broadcasting System. It was originally powered at 250 watts and had its studios in the Mount Trust Bank Building.

For most of the 1960s and 70s, it broadcast a Top 40 format. In 1989, WROV began an oldies format, playing the hits of the 1950s, 1960s and early 1970s. In 1998, it became an ESPN Radio affiliate, changing its call sign to WGMN. The call letters represented the "Game Network", for its sports radio format.

WGMN switched to a talk radio format in June 2019. The station carried mostly syndicated conservative talk shows.

On June 17, 2024, Three Daughters sold WGMN and its translator to Stu-Comm, Inc., the owners of non-profit adult album alternative station WNRN-FM in Charlottesville as well as a network of relays across Virginia, for $425,000. WNRN programming began on July 1.

=== Translator ===
In addition to the main station, WGMN is relayed by an additional translator to widen its broadcast area.

Call sign	Frequency	City of license	FID	ERP (W)	Class	FCC info
W258DN	99.5 FM	Roanoke, Virginia	202973	250	D	LMS
