= 1230 AM =

AM radio frequency

The following radio stations broadcast on AM frequency 1230 kHz: 1230 AM is a regional (Class B) frequency outside the coterminous United States (Alaska, Hawaii, Puerto Rico, and the U.S. Virgin Islands) and a local (Class C) broadcast frequency within the coterminous 48 states.

== Argentina ==
- LT2 in Rosario, Santa Fe.

== Bermuda ==
- ZFB

== Canada ==
Call sign	City of license	Daytime power (kW)	Nighttime power (kW)	Transmitter coordinates
CBPD-1	Glacier Park, British Columbia	0.005	0.005	51.3°N 117.501°W
CFFB	Iqaluit, Nunavut	1	1	63.7475°N 68.509167°W
CHFC	Churchill, Manitoba	0.25	0.25	58.755°N 94.0944°W

== Mexico ==
- XEDKN-AM in Guadalajara, Jalisco
- XEIZ-AM in Monterrey, Nuevo León
- XETVH-AM in Villahermosa, Tabasco

== United States ==
Call sign	City of license	Facility ID	Class	Daytime power (kW)	Nighttime power (kW)	Unlimited power (kW)	Transmitter coordinates
KAAA	Kingman, Arizona	55492	C	1	1		35.163611°N 114.07°W
KADA	Ada, Oklahoma	33259	C			1	34.785°N 96.678889°W
KATO	Safford, Arizona	40914	C			1	32.829444°N 109.754444°W
KBAR	Burley, Idaho	42884	C			1	42.534722°N 113.815°W
KBOV	Bishop, California	24947	C			1	37.345556°N 118.395278°W
KBTM	Jonesboro, Arkansas	17692	C	1	1		35.841111°N 90.662222°W
KBZZ	Reno, Nevada	202	C	1	1		39.513889°N 119.715°W
KCOH	Houston, Texas	65309	C			1	29.757222°N 95.338333°W
KCOH	Houston, Texas	65309	C			0.41	29.859444°N 95.558889°W
KCUP	Toledo, Oregon	645	C	1	1		44.631111°N 123.944444°W
KDIX	Dickinson, North Dakota	62361	C			1	46.8725°N 102.743889°W
KDRN	Del Rio, Texas	22119	C	0.86	0.86		29.429167°N 100.904722°W
KDYM	Sunnyside, Washington	4757	C	0.7	0.7		46.330278°N 120.036111°W
KDZA	Pueblo, Colorado	53851	C	1	1		38.277778°N 104.654167°W
KELY	Ely, Nevada	55462	C			0.25	39.2625°N 114.862778°W
KERV	Kerrville, Texas	25378	C			0.99	30.070556°N 99.185278°W
KFJB	Marshalltown, Iowa	40465	C	1	1		42.064167°N 92.9675°W
KFPW	Fort Smith, Arkansas	23868	C	1	1		35.391667°N 94.331667°W
KFSP	Mankato, Minnesota	20386	C	1	1		44.168333°N 93.910833°W
KFUN	Las Vegas, New Mexico	34442	C	1	1		35.596667°N 105.205833°W
KGEO	Bakersfield, California	36233	C			1	35.348056°N 119.009167°W
KGHS	International Falls, Minnesota	12723	C	0.46	0.23		48.591389°N 93.381667°W
KGRO	Pampa, Texas	51418	C			1	35.5775°N 100.952222°W
KHAS	Hastings, Nebraska	34487	C			1	40.577778°N 98.404722°W
KHDN	Hardin, Montana	5298	C			1	45.715278°N 107.599722°W
KHSN	Coos Bay, Oregon	4082	C	1	1		43.432778°N 124.208333°W
KIFW	Sitka, Alaska	60516	B			1	57.0575°N 135.333889°W
KJJC	Murray, Utah	58303	C			1	40.665833°N 111.907222°W
KKOR	Astoria, Oregon	38907	C			1	46.1875°N 123.825°W
KKSB	Steamboat Springs, Colorado	63191	C			1	40.488611°N 106.849167°W
KLAV	Las Vegas, Nevada	70690	C	0.9	1		36.213056°N 115.1625°W
KLVT	Levelland, Texas	30026	C			1	33.598333°N 102.385556°W
KLXR	Redding, California	55413	C			1	40.553889°N 122.381389°W
KMRS	Morris, Minnesota	71877	C			1	45.603056°N 95.887222°W
KORT	Grangeville, Idaho	138	C			1	45.931111°N 116.130556°W
KOTS	Deming, New Mexico	39244	C			1	32.251389°N 107.757778°W
KOY	Phoenix, Arizona	63914	C			1	33.436111°N 112.109444°W
KOZI	Chelan, Washington	49370	C	1	1		47.85°N 120.005556°W
KPRL	Paso Robles, California	64342	C			1	35.654167°N 120.681111°W
KRSY	Alamogordo, New Mexico	14029	C			1	32.896111°N 105.945°W
KRXK	Rexburg, Idaho	12664	C			1	43.847222°N 111.784167°W
KRYN	Gresham, Oregon	51210	C			0.92	45.484167°N 122.411111°W
KSBN	Spokane, Washington	64668	C			1	47.658333°N 117.418889°W
KSFX	Roswell, New Mexico	14926	C	0.62	1		33.393611°N 104.604444°W
KSIX	Corpus Christi, Texas	13964	C	0.72	0.72		27.783889°N 97.4575°W
KSJK	Talent, Oregon	62157	C			1	42.226944°N 122.7425°W
KSLO	Opelousas, Louisiana	35607	C	1	1		30.525°N 92.106111°W
KSST	Sulphur Springs, Texas	27630	C			1	33.116667°N 95.584722°W
KSTC	Sterling, Colorado	35639	C	1	1		40.617778°N 103.178056°W
KSZL	Barstow, California	21496	C			1	34.912222°N 117.0275°W
KTNC	Falls City, Nebraska	8081	C	0.5	1		40.065833°N 95.615278°W
KTRF	Thief River Falls, Minnesota	73627	C			1	48.129722°N 96.186389°W
KVAK	Valdez, Alaska	12187	B			1	61.121111°N 146.256944°W
KVOC	Casper, Wyoming	35861	C			1	42.834722°N 106.295556°W
KWG	Stockton, California	60418	C	0.9	0.9		37.959444°N 121.257778°W
KWIX	Moberly, Missouri	35889	C	0.49	1		39.403056°N 92.4325°W
KWNO	Winona, Minnesota	72152	C	1	0.99		44.033611°N 91.605°W
KWSN	Sioux Falls, South Dakota	59813	C	0.44	0.44		43.457778°N 96.670556°W
KWTX	Waco, Texas	33057	C			1	31.528333°N 97.120556°W
KWYZ	Everett, Washington	54040	C			1	47.968333°N 122.173333°W
KXLO	Lewistown, Montana	35963	C			1	47.071111°N 109.408889°W
KXO	El Centro, California	35969	C	0.83	1		32.806667°N 115.545556°W
KYPA	Los Angeles, California	18273	C	1	1		34.085556°N 118.256667°W
KYVA	Gallup, New Mexico	35026	C	0.92	0.92		35.533889°N 108.705°W
KZHC	Burns, Oregon	62265	C	1	1		43.564722°N 119.059444°W
KZYM	Joplin, Missouri	407	C	0.56	0.6		37.076111°N 94.542222°W
WABN	Abingdon, Virginia	36981	C	1	1		36.734167°N 81.971667°W
WAIM	Anderson, South Carolina	51346	C			1	34.531111°N 82.613889°W
WAKI	McMinnville, Tennessee	17758	C	0.62	1		35.666667°N 85.776389°W
WAUD	Auburn, Alabama	3204	C	1	1		32.627778°N 85.460278°W
WAYX	Waycross, Georgia	129162	C	1	1		31.193611°N 82.323056°W
WBBZ	Ponca City, Oklahoma	52931	C			1	36.696111°N 97.051944°W
WBET	Sturgis, Michigan	22120	C	1	1		41.769722°N 85.419167°W
WBHP	Huntsville, Alabama	44025	C			1	34.719167°N 86.595°W
WBLJ	Dalton, Georgia	49233	C			1	34.756389°N 84.950556°W
WBLQ	Westerly, Rhode Island	71722	C	1	1		41.365833°N 71.836389°W
WBOK	New Orleans, Louisiana	10917	C			1	29.988333°N 90.045833°W
WBPZ	Lock Haven, Pennsylvania	37740	C			1	41.134167°N 77.469167°W
WBVP	Beaver Falls, Pennsylvania	52746	C			1	40.737778°N 80.296389°W
WBZT	West Palm Beach, Florida	20439	C			1	26.759167°N 80.144444°W
WBZT	Pompano Beach, Florida	20439	C			0.8	26.255°N 80.146944°W
WCBT	Roanoke Rapids, North Carolina	71250	C			1	36.445833°N 77.664167°W
WCDS	Glasgow, Kentucky	160849	C	0.75	0.75		37.004722°N 85.940833°W
WCLO	Janesville, Wisconsin	61390	C			1	42.659722°N 89.042222°W
WCMC	Wildwood, New Jersey	70259	C			1	39.0025°N 74.812778°W
WCMD	Cumberland, Maryland	49381	C	1	1		39.643889°N 78.742222°W
WCRO	Johnstown, Pennsylvania	18050	C			1	40.331944°N 78.912778°W
WCWA	Toledo, Ohio	19627	C			1	41.636944°N 83.564444°W
WDBZ	Cincinnati, Ohio	10139	C	1	1		39.114167°N 84.492222°W
WDWR	Pensacola, Florida	21773	C	0.79	0.79		30.433056°N 87.218889°W
WECK	Cheektowaga, New York	1914	C	1	1		42.924167°N 78.778056°W
WEEX	Easton, Pennsylvania	8596	C	1	1		40.708333°N 75.216667°W
WESX	Nahant, Massachusetts	49301	C	0.45	0.45		42.452778°N 70.980556°W
WEZO	Augusta, Georgia	28610	C			1	33.453889°N 82.029722°W
WFAY	Fayetteville, North Carolina	72055	C	1	1		35.071389°N 78.874167°W
WFER	Iron River, Michigan	49684	C			1	46.065278°N 88.638056°W
WFOA	Baltimore, Maryland	25527	C	0.6	0.6		39.301667°N 76.569167°W
WFOM	Marietta, Georgia	72066	C	1	1		33.927222°N 84.502222°W
WFVA	Fredericksburg, Virginia	41813	C			1	38.280556°N 77.436389°W
WFXN	Moline, Illinois	43199	C			1	41.481667°N 90.530278°W
WGUY	Veazie, Maine	160465	C	1	0.64		44.847222°N 68.679167°W
WHCO	Sparta, Illinois	27264	C			1	38.123611°N 89.722222°W
WHIR	Danville, Kentucky	52308	C			1	37.674444°N 84.768333°W
WHOP	Hopkinsville, Kentucky	27634	C			1	36.881667°N 87.512222°W
WHUC	Hudson, New York	63531	C			1	42.253611°N 73.7625°W
WIBQ	Terre Haute, Indiana	136105	C	1	1		39.489167°N 87.419444°W
WITO	Ironton, Ohio	61685	C			1	38.539444°N 82.671389°W
WIXT	Little Falls, New York	57701	C			1	43.0425°N 74.858611°W
WJBC	Bloomington, Illinois	5876	C			1	40.450278°N 89.011667°W
WJOB	Hammond, Indiana	12219	C			1	41.596944°N 87.479167°W
WJOY	Burlington, Vermont	25864	C			1	44.450833°N 73.1975°W
WJUL	Hiawassee, Georgia	160899	C	1	1		34.942778°N 83.774167°W
WKBO	Harrisburg, Pennsylvania	15323	C			0.48	40.281111°N 76.868333°W
WKLK	Cloquet, Minnesota	53998	C			0.72	46.749444°N 92.421389°W
WKWL	Florala, Alabama	21743	C			1	31.005556°N 86.331389°W
WLNR	Kinston, North Carolina	57609	C			1	35.258611°N 77.609167°W
WMAJ	Elmira, New York	71510	C	1	0.91		42.074722°N 76.779722°W
WMFR	High Point, North Carolina	73257	C			1	35.955556°N 80.006111°W
WMLR	Hohenwald, Tennessee	37180	C			1	35.522778°N 87.544444°W
WMML	Glens Falls, New York	49715	C	1	1		43.329167°N 73.648333°W
WMOU	Berlin, New Hampshire	48404	C	1	0.93		44.482778°N 71.177222°W
WMPC	Lapeer, Michigan	65496	C			1	43.079444°N 83.309722°W
WNAW	North Adams, Massachusetts	4823	C			1	42.684167°N 73.106389°W
WNEB	Worcester, Massachusetts	249	C			1	42.273056°N 71.823056°W
WNEZ	Manchester, Connecticut	36684	C	1	1		41.776111°N 72.5575°W
WNIK	Arecibo, Puerto Rico	33876	B	1	1		18.455556°N 66.74°W
WNNC	Newton, North Carolina	48788	C			1	35.672222°N 81.236667°W
WOLH	Florence, South Carolina	73400	C			1	34.23°N 79.746944°W
WONN	Lakeland, Florida	25868	C			1	28.039722°N 81.960833°W
WQJM	Pineville, Kentucky	31153	C			1	36.768611°N 83.716389°W
WRBD	Gainesville, Florida	72101	C			1	29.682222°N 82.413333°W
WSAL	Logansport, Indiana	38277	C			1	40.754444°N 86.311111°W
WSBB	New Smyrna Beach, Florida	64368	C			1	29.0325°N 80.9175°W
WSKY	Asheville, North Carolina	56521	C	1	1		35.618889°N 82.571944°W
WSOK	Savannah, Georgia	50406	C			1	32.072222°N 81.076389°W
WSOO	Sault St. Marie, Michigan	20420	C	1	1		46.440278°N 84.376944°W
WTBC	Tuscaloosa, Alabama	731	C	1	1		33.219167°N 87.508611°W
WTCJ	Tell City, Indiana	18277	C	0.85	0.85		37.925833°N 86.721944°W
WTIV	Titusville, Pennsylvania	74089	C	1	1		41.616667°N 79.692222°W
WTKG	Grand Rapids, Michigan	51720	C	1	1		42.995°N 85.676667°W
WTSV	Claremont, New Hampshire	17795	C			1	43.370833°N 72.328333°W
WVNT	Parkersburg, West Virginia	22678	C	0.88	0.88		39.258056°N 81.563611°W
WXCO	Wausau, Wisconsin	59611	C	1	1		44.974722°N 89.6125°W
WXLI	Dublin, Georgia	36722	C			0.7	32.5225°N 82.9°W
WYTS	Columbus, Ohio	25038	C			1	39.941944°N 83.022222°W
