= W251AO =

Relays WOXL-HD2, Biltmore Forest
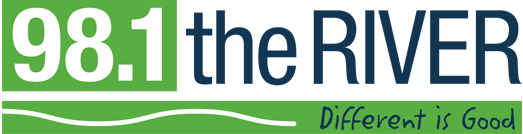
- Asheville, North Carolina; United States
- Broadcast area: Asheville, North Carolina
- Frequency: 98.1 MHz
- Branding: 98.1 The River

Programming
- Format: Triple-A

Ownership
- Owner: Saga Communications; (Saga Communications of North Carolina, LLC)
- Sister stations: WISE, WOXL-FM, WTMT

History
- First air date: Oct. 1, 2008

Technical information
- Licensing authority: FCC
- Facility ID: 137991
- Class: D
- ERP: 250 watts
- HAAT: 326.1 meters (1,070 ft)
- Transmitter coordinates: 35.6013°N 82.6518°W

Links
- Public license information: Public file; LMS
- Webcast: Listen Live
- Website: 981theriver.com

W251AO, WOXL-HD2, 98.1 the River is a Triple-A low-power radio station in Asheville, North Carolina. It is operated by Asheville Radio Group, a subsidiary of Saga Communications, owner of WOXL-FM, WISE and WTMT. In addition to the over-the-air signal, The River is also heard on WOXL's second HD Radio channel, where it began.

== History ==
Originally, 98.1 was a translator for WISE. The River signed on October 1, 2008, with 10,000 songs in a row. Artists include Dave Matthews, Bob Marley, Van Morrison, Elvis Costello, Indigo Girls, R.E.M., U2, Norah Jones and Jack Johnson as well as less familiar performers such as Ray LaMontagne, Sara Bareilles, The John Butler Trio, My Morning Jacket, G. Love & Special Sauce and Ingrid Michaelson.

General manager Bob Bolak described the station as being designed for those who do not like radio. Listeners of The River, he said, want quality music, both old and new. Brad Savage of WCNR in Charlottesville, Virginia acted as consultant. The first songs played were "Take Me to the River" by Talking Heads, "Radio Nowhere" by Bruce Springsteen and R.E.M.'s "It's The End Of The World As We Know It (And I Feel Fine)."
