= WKSF =

Radio station in Old Fort–Asheville, North Carolina, United States

- Old Fort, North Carolina; United States
- Broadcast area: Western North Carolina, Upstate South Carolina, Eastern Tennessee
- Frequency: 99.9 MHz (HD Radio)
- Branding: 99.9 Kiss Country

Programming
- Format: Country
- Subchannels: HD2: Adult hits "97.7 The Brew"
- Affiliations: Premiere Networks

Ownership
- Owner: iHeartMedia, Inc.; (iHM Licenses, LLC)
- Sister stations: WQNQ; WQNS; WWNC; WPEK; WMXF

History
- First air date: August 11, 1947 (as WLOS-FM)
- Former call signs: WLOS-FM (1947–1984); WRLX-FM (1984)
- Former frequencies: 104.3 MHz (1947–1962)
- Call sign meaning: "Kiss FM"

Technical information
- Licensing authority: FCC
- Facility ID: 2947
- Class: C
- ERP: 53,000 watts
- HAAT: 786 meters (2,579 ft)
- Translator: HD2: 97.7 W249AR (Asheville)

Links
- Public license information: Public file; LMS
- Webcast: Listen live (via iHeartRadio); HD2: Listen live (via iHeartRadio)
- Website: 99kisscountry.iheart.com; HD2: 977thebrew.iheart.com

WKSF (99.9 FM "Kiss Country") is a country music station licensed to Old Fort, North Carolina, serving the Asheville area. The station is owned by iHeartMedia, Inc. and broadcasts from a tower on Mount Pisgah, southwest of Asheville.

== History ==
=== Early years ===
WLOS-FM launched alongside WLOS (1380 AM) on August 11, 1947. It originally broadcast for six hours a day on 104.3 MHz with a program schedule separate from the AM station. WLOS-FM began simulcasting the AM station on February 1, 1948. A television station, WLOS-TV (channel 13), began broadcasting in 1954.

A squabble over options to purchase stock in Skyway Broadcasting Company erupted in April 1957, when Harold H. Thoms—owner of WISE radio and television—and Walter Tison of Tampa, Florida, announced they had an option to buy shares in the firm and were going to exercise it. Skyway denied that any such option existed, claiming that it was based on an option extended to a minority stockholder—J. E. Edmonds—and later withdrawn. The matter was taken to court, where Edmonds attacked the validity of a 1953 option awarded to the Asheville Citizen-Times newspaper during WLOS's fight for channel 13, which remained outstanding. Then, that option catapulted into the spotlight when Miami businessman Mitchell Wolfson—a summer resident of Asheville—announced that he had acquired the Citizen-Times option through his other broadcast property, WTVJ in Miami, and that he was offering a buyout of all other shareholders in Skyway. The so-called "Britt option" that Thoms and Tison claimed to hold became the subject of multiple court cases as Thoms and Tison sued Britt and others for breach of contract.

On March 1, 1958, Wolfson's company, Wometco Enterprises, announced it had reached a deal to buy Britt's stock in Skyway Broadcasting and thus assume majority ownership of the WLOS stations. The FCC approved the transaction in August, and upon closure, several WTVJ employees moved to Asheville to help manage WLOS radio and television.

WLOS-FM moved to 99.9 MHz in 1962 and split programming in the mid-1960s with beautiful music. Wometco sold off WLOS AM to the Greater Asheville Broadcasting Corporation in 1969, retaining the FM and TV stations; the AM station changed its call sign to WKKE when the sale took effect.

=== Pop years ===
In 1984, Wometco was taken private in a leveraged buyout by Kohlberg Kravis Roberts (KKR). As part of this transaction, to comply with Federal Communications Commission (FCC) cross-ownership restrictions, WLOS-FM—the only radio station Wometco owned—was sold to Asheville radio station WISE. The sale was completed in April.

The call sign was immediately changed to WRLX as part of the separation from the TV station. While WISE intended to stick with the easy listening format, it noticed a high amount of listenership to contemporary hit radio stations. As a result, on September 17, 1984, the station switched to a contemporary format as WKSF "Kiss FM". Prior to the sale, WISE had been a contemporary station, and rumors had circulated as early as February that the new ownership would transplant that format to the FM band, boosting ratings. The audience share for the FM frequency soared immediately, from 9.1 percent in 1984 to 27.8 percent in 1985, though within Asheville the station continued to lag the dominant WWNC (570 AM). WISE and WKSF were sold to Heritage Broadcast Group in 1986; the Asheville stations were at the time the largest owned by the Atlanta-based company. Between 1986 and 1993, the station's ratings declined in most years.

=== Country music ===
Osborn Communications agreed to buy WKSF from Heritage Broadcast Group in December 1993 and began managing the station in March 1994. Osborn flipped WKSF from Top 40 to country. There was no country station on FM, and FM country stations from beyond Asheville, such as WIVK in Knoxville, Tennessee, and WESC-FM in Greenville, South Carolina, had some listenership in the area. After the switch to country, the station's ratings stopped their decline, and in 1996, WKSF became the top-billing and highest-rated station in the market, dethroning WWNC, which Osborn had come to own.

Osborn Communications was acquired by Capstar in 1996. Chancellor Media then merged with Capstar Communications in 1999 and changed its name to AMFM, Inc. AMFM then merged with Clear Channel Communications, predecessor to iHeartMedia, in 2000.

In 2004, when WQNQ began airing separate programming from WQNS, the station moved its city of license from Old Fort, which required another station moving its city of license to Old Fort. WKSF, always licensed to Asheville before that, made this move.

== Coverage ==
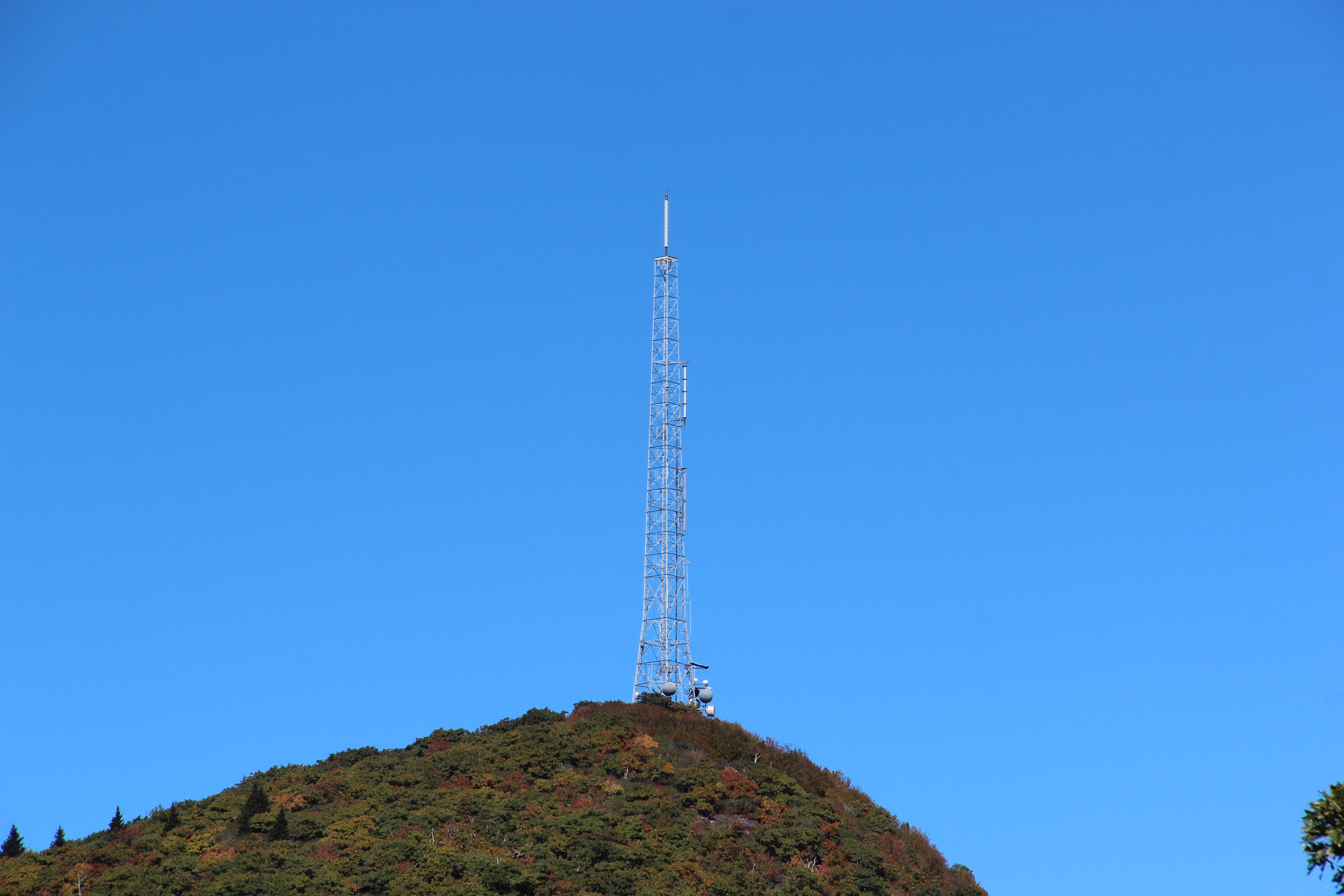
The WKSF transmitting tower on Mount Pisgah

WKSF's transmitter is sited atop Mount Pisgah (at an elevation of over 5,700 feet (1,700 m) above sea level), giving it a wide coverage area across Western North Carolina and beyond. With the height of the tower and the mountain combined, the transmitter actually sits at over 6,000 feet (1,800 m) in elevation, making it the radio station with one of the highest transmitters east of the Mississippi River behind WMIT and WNCW on Clingman's Peak near Mount Mitchell, and WHOM on Mount Washington, New Hampshire. The station shares a tower with WLOS-TV, which is dubbed as having the highest TV transmitter east of the Mississippi. In addition to Western North Carolina, WKSF's signal makes it into parts of South Carolina, Georgia, Tennessee, Virginia and even parts of southeast Kentucky.

The station can be heard well west of Knoxville, fading out near Crossville, Tennessee, and prior to 2005 with the inception of WCMC-FM in Raleigh, could be heard at higher elevations in central North Carolina as far east as Chatham County and Orange County.

== Programming ==
Kiss Country plays a mix of modern and older country music, with more emphasis on current artists. WKSF was the 2009 CMA Small Market Station of the Year. Staff include Eddie Foxx and Amanda Foxx of the "Eddie Foxx Show".

=== Hurricane Ivan ===
During the passage of the remnants of Hurricane Ivan through western North Carolina in 2004, the station preempted its music broadcasting, so that residents throughout western North Carolina could call in storm and damage reports. The station also relayed flood information, updated road closings and power outage reports throughout the storm.

=== 97.7 The Brew ===
On July 22, 2014, 97.7 the Brew, an adult hits station, made its debut on the WKSF HD-2 channel. According to Clear Channel Asheville operations director Jeff Davis, the name refers to Asheville's craft beer industry, and music will include the decades the 1970s to the 2000s "and maybe even a little 60s", with formats ranging from Top 40 to hot adult contemporary to classic and mainstream rock and even country music. Artists include U2, Katy Perry, Boston, Bon Jovi, Lady Antebellum, Michael Jackson and Madonna. The station can also be heard on iHeartRadio and W249AR at 97.7 FM.

On November 1, 2023, 97.7 The Brew flipped to an all-Christmas format for the first time ever, filling a void for the format when WSPA-FM moved to 106.3 MHz, a frequency that could not be received in Asheville. Coincidentally, the translator used to repeat WSPA-FM when it was on 98.9, including its Christmas format.

Broadcast translator for WKSF-HD2
Call sign	Frequency	City of license	FID	ERP (W)	HAAT	Class	Transmitter coordinates	FCC info
W249AR	97.7 FM	Asheville, North Carolina	66403	100	358 m (1,175 ft)	D	35°35′23.3″N 82°40′25.4″W	LMS

=== HD3 (101.1 FM) ===
On June 11, 2018, 101.1 The Revolution, a progressive talk format, made its debut on the WKSF HD3 channel, when that format moved from WPEK 880 AM Fairview, which switched to ESPN sports. On December 20, 2018, WKSF-HD3 changed their format from progressive talk to alternative rock, branded as "Alt 101.1". The HD3 subchannel was eventually turned off as the format moved to WQNQ-HD2.
