= KZHC =

KZHC may refer to:

- KZHC (AM), a radio station (1230 AM) licensed to serve Burns, Oregon, United States
- KZHC-FM, a radio station (92.7 FM) licensed to serve Burns, Oregon, United States
- KICL, a radio station (96.3 FM) licensed to serve Pleasantville, Iowa, United States, which held the call sign KZHC in 2011
