= WUIV =

Icard, North Carolina; United States
- Frequency: 1580 kHz

Programming
- Format: Defunct

Ownership
- Owner: Unifour Broadcasting Co., Inc.

History
- First air date: March 29, 1981
- Last air date: January 1993
- Call sign meaning: "U" and the Roman numeral "IV" represent the Unifour, a region of North Carolina

Technical information
- Power: 5,000 watts (day only)

WUIV (1580 AM) was a radio station licensed to Icard, North Carolina, United States. It operated on 1580 kHz with a power of 5,000 watts daytime. The last owner of the station was Unifour Broadcasting Co., Inc.

== History ==
Jimmy R. Jacumin applied on June 30, 1976, for a new broadcast station to serve Icard. The construction permit was granted on April 27, 1979, and the new station began broadcasting as WUIV on March 29, 1981. It originally broadcast a middle-of-the-road soft rock format.

Two years after going on air, on February 21, 1983, Jacumin switched the format to Southern gospel. He told a reporter from The Charlotte Observer that with the former format, "in essence, we were serving the Devil" by broadcasting such artists as Olivia Newton-John, John Denver, and Glen Campbell. The station still lost money after the format flip, but it noted an increase in listener interest—over 2,000 people signed petitions to make sure the new format stayed—as well as a doubling of the number of advertisers. Many listeners were shut-ins, but there were also young people. By 1989, WUIV was one of five stations, four of them on the AM band, airing similar music.

In 1991, WUIV entered into a local marketing agreement with WNNC in Newton, North Carolina, and began simulcasting that station's adult contemporary format. The agreement ended in January 1993, at which time WUIV was reported silent.
