= WQNQ =

Coordinates: 35.528°N 82.497°W

- Fletcher, North Carolina; United States
- Broadcast area: Asheville, North Carolina
- Frequency: 104.3 MHz (HD Radio)
- Branding: Star 104.3

Programming
- Format: Top 40 (CHR)
- Subchannels: HD2: Classic hip hop "Throwbacks 101.1"
- Affiliations: Premiere Networks

Ownership
- Owner: iHeartMedia, Inc.; (iHM Licenses, LLC)
- Sister stations: WKSF, WQNS, WWNC, WPEK, WMXF

History
- First air date: October 1991 (as WDLF)
- Former call signs: WDLF (1991–1996); WMXF (1996–1999)

Technical information
- Licensing authority: FCC
- Facility ID: 71341
- Class: A
- ERP: 470 watts
- HAAT: 349 meters (1,145 ft)
- Translator: HD2: 101.1 W266CP (Canden)

Links
- Public license information: Public file; LMS
- Webcast: Listen live (via iHeartRadio); HD2: Listen live (via iHeartRadio)
- Website: star1043.iheart.com; HD2: throwbacksavl.iheart.com

WQNQ (104.3 FM) is a United States radio station serving the Asheville, North Carolina, area. The station has a Top 40 (CHR) music format and is owned by iHeartMedia, Inc. The station is known on the air as "Star 104.3".

WQNQ is licensed to Fletcher, North Carolina, outside Asheville. The station broadcasts at an effective radiated power of 470 watts from a transmitter located 349 meters (1,145 feet) above the average surrounding terrain.

== History ==
The station signed on in October 1991 as WDLF in Old Fort, North Carolina, with a soft adult contemporary format known as "Delightful 104". The studios were actually located in Marion, North Carolina. The station was sold to Blue Dolphin Communications in November 1996. The station made an attempt to move into the Asheville market in 1998 as the format was changed to hot adult contemporary as "Mix 104" under the new call letters of WMXF. It was the first hit-oriented pop station since WKSF went country more than a decade earlier, with a format that was essentially "Top 40 without the head-banging rock or rap". Artists included Elton John and The Spice Girls. Anna "Dawn" Creasman, formerly of WISE, WKSF and WZLS, was one of the DJs. When they switched from live DJs to satellite this caused a lot of public disapproval. The original company they contracted with was Jones Satellite out of Colorado. Another station in the area--WKBC-FM—also carried Jones Hot AC during the day and the overnight, meaning both stations played the same songs and had the same DJs. Jones was dropped for this reason, and for not being contemporary enough, and ABC Radio Networks hot AC was added. When Mix 104 went to satellite they added the Bob and Sheri morning show from WLNK, which was dropped abruptly by station management, due to public complaints. They added Scott and Todd in the Morning from New York City which was not greeted well due to the market. In late 1998 the studio was moved from Marion to Asheville soon after the tower was moved from Wildcat Mountain outside of Old Fort to a tower outside of Asheville. Because of the mountainous terrain in the Asheville market, the station signal range was still limited.

Star 104.3's former logo from approximately 2005 to April 2015. The current logo adopts the KISS-FM fonts.

On September 20, 1999, the hot AC format was dropped and 104.3 began to simulcast WQNS 104.9 FM from Waynesville as WQNQ, with a format change to classic rock as "Rock 104". This meant the two stations would cover a larger area than either one could separately. John Boy and Billy would be heard on the station in the morning. Creasman made the move from Mix 104. The WMXF call sign was moved to the co-owned AM in Waynesville as that station switched to adult standards. All three of these Blue Dolphin-owned stations, plus WTZY, were sold to Clear Channel Communications by 2001.

In 2005, WQNQ's signal was upgraded and a decision was made to have separate programming, by splitting from its simulcast with WQNS and flipped back to hot adult contemporary as "Star 104.3". The tower was moved to the Fletcher area, and the city of license was moved closer to Asheville by swapping with sister station WKSF. The change gave WQNQ a significant boost in listener numbers.

On September 20, 2010, Star 104.3 segued from its hot AC format to a Top 40 (CHR) format, becoming the market's first station with that format in many years. Prior to this change, listeners who wanted to hear this format had to listen to out-of-market WFBC-FM, located in Greenville, South Carolina.

== HD Radio ==
On July 15, 2024, WQNQ-HD2 changed its format from alternative rock "Alt 101.1" to classic hip hop, branded as "Throwbacks 101.1".
