= Everything You Love Will Burn =

2018 book by Vegas Tenold

- Author: Vegas Tenold
- Publisher: Bold Type Books
- Publication date: 2018

Everything You Love Will Burn: Inside the Rebirth of White Nationalism in America is a 2018 book by Vegas Tenold.

== Background ==
Tenold spent six years researching and interacting with right-wing groups in the United States. Tenold finished writing the book right before the 2016 presidential election. The book discusses American Neo-Nazis, the Ku Klux Klan, and white power skinheads. Tenold explores the connections between white nationalists in the United States and Russia. According to the Hartford Courant, the book documents how white supremacist violence is increasing in the United States.

== Reception ==
Stephanie Jones-Byrne wrote in Asheville Citizen-Times that the book "provides a useful primer on the history, ebb and flow of white nationalism in the United States." Shaila Dewan wrote in The New York Times that "While the book provides plenty of color, it lacks much insight." Kirkus Reviews called the book a "well-reported if dispiriting chronicle."
