= KBNH =

KBNH may refer to:

- KBNH-LP, a low-power radio station (100.7 FM) licensed to serve Brownsville, Texas, United States
- KZHC (AM), a radio station (1230 AM) licensed to serve Burns, Oregon, United States, which held the call sign KBNH from 2010 to 2017
