= Chfc =

Chfc, CHFC or ChFC may refer to:

- Chartered Financial Consultant
- CHFC (AM), a radio rebroadcaster (1230 AM) licensed to Churchill, Manitoba, Canada, rebroadcasting CBWK-FM
- CHFC-TV, a former television retransmitter (channel 8) licensed to Churchill, Manitoba, Canada, retransmitting CBWT
- Chainat Hornbill F.C.
- Colney Heath F.C.
- Cork Hibernians F.C.
