= WZRQ =

WZRQ may refer to:

- WRDF, a radio station (106.3 FM) licensed to Columbia City, Indiana, which held the call sign WZRQ from 1985 to 1990
- WFTK, a radio station (96.5 FM) licensed to Lebanon, Ohio, which held the call sign WZRQ from 1990 to 1991
- WKKF, a radio station (102.3 FM) licensed to Ballston Spa, New York, which held the call sign WZRQ from 1991 to 1996
- WOXL-FM, a radio station (96.5 FM) licensed to Biltmore Forest, North Carolina, which held the call sign WZRQ from 1997 to 1998
