= WWNC =

Coordinates: 35°35′49.4″N 82°36′23.5″W

- Asheville, North Carolina; United States
- Broadcast area: Western North Carolina
- Frequency: 570 kHz
- Branding: News Radio 570

Programming
- Format: Talk radio
- Affiliations: Fox News Radio; Premiere Networks; Compass Media Networks; Carolina Panthers Radio Network

Ownership
- Owner: iHeartMedia, Inc.; (iHM Licenses, LLC)
- Sister stations: WKSF, WMXF, WQNQ, WQNS, WPEK

History
- First air date: June 1925
- Former call signs: WABC (1925–1926)
- Call sign meaning: Wonderful Western North Carolina

Technical information
- Licensing authority: FCC
- Facility ID: 2946
- Class: B
- Power: 5,000 watts
- Translator: 92.9 W225CJ (Asheville)

Links
- Public license information: Public file; LMS
- Webcast: Listen live (via iHeartRadio)
- Website: wwnc.iheart.com

WWNC (570 AM) is a commercial radio station licensed to Asheville, North Carolina, United States. It broadcasts a talk format and is owned by iHeartMedia, Inc. The station's studios and transmitter site are on Summerlin Road in Asheville.

WWNC's programming features Glenn Beck and The Clay Travis and Buck Sexton Show in middays, The Sean Hannity Show in afternoons, The Ramsey Show in evenings and Coast to Coast AM in overnights. Mark Starling hosts a local program in mornings.

== History ==
=== Early years ===
WWNC is Asheville's oldest radio station, and among the oldest in North Carolina. It was first licensed, as WABC, on June 24, 1925, to the Asheville Battery Company at 19 Haywood Street. As of June 30, 1926, the station was listed on 1180 kHz with a transmitter power of 20 watts.

In late 1926, it was announced that an application had been filed to transfer ownership of WABC to the Asheville Chamber of Commerce, and change its call sign to WWNC, which stood for "Wonderful Western North Carolina". This allowed A. H. Grebe to transfer the WABC call sign to a New York City station, which was licensed to the Atlantic Broadcasting Company.

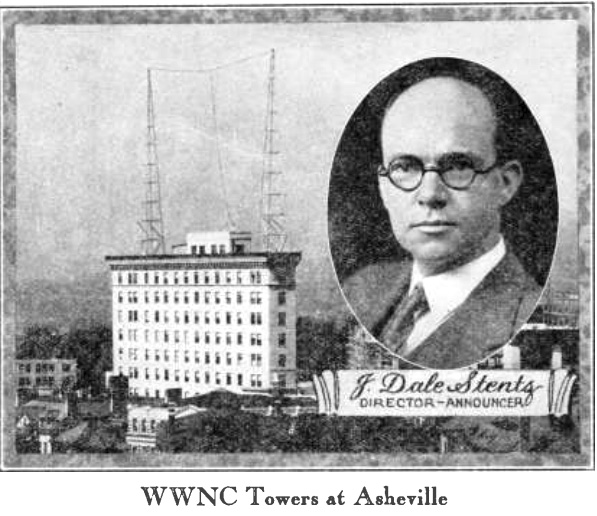
In early 1927, WWNC began using an upgraded facility, which included an antenna strung between two towers constructed atop the Flatiron Building.

The Chamber also financed a major upgrade, which included a power increase to 1,000 watts, and relocated the transmitter site to atop the Flatiron Building. This new configuration made its debut broadcast on February 21, 1927, at 7:00 pm. The station has traditionally recognized this as its founding date. On November 11, 1928, WWNC was moved to its current frequency of 570 kHz, as part of the implementation of the Federal Radio Commission's General Order 40. The Citizen Broadcasting Company acquired the station on February 4, 1929.

The studios were at the Vanderbilt Hotel. Other broadcast locations have included the Flatiron Building and the Citizen-Times Building when it was owned by the daily newspaper. For most of its early years, WWNC was powered at 1,000 watts.

In its early days, WWNC provided weather and road reports, and music at night. Country legend Jimmie Rodgers and Bascom Lamar Lunsford were among the stars who performed on the station. Information included "local sporting events, crop futures and farmers markets, and social and economic affairs (billed as being everything 'from house work to bridge')." WWNC also aired church services. Because the station could be heard throughout the Eastern United States and even in Canada and Mexico, WWNC became valuable in attracting tourists. On October 10, 1931, WWNC changed its affiliation from CBS Radio to the NBC Red Network.

=== Popular shows ===
On September 10, 1936, President Franklin Roosevelt spoke at McCormick Field. WWNC broadcast the speech. The station was the Western North Carolina home to Amos and Andy, Fibber McGee and Molly and Jack Benny. In 1938, WWNC was one of the many stations broadcasting Orson Welles' The War of the Worlds.

The first time the world heard Bill Monroe and the Blue Grass Boys was February 2, 1939, at 3:30 pm when the group played a 15-minute segment on Mountain Music Time. At the time, WWNC was an NBC affiliate, owned by the Asheville Citizen-Times. Bill Monroe and the Blue Grass Boys played the daily 3:30-3:45 Mountain Music spot until April 1, 1939. On that date, WWNC left NBC and rejoined CBS.

On September 28, 1953, the Asheville Citizen-Times and WWNC were sold to Roger C. Peace and J. Kelly Sisk, owners of the Greenville News and Piedmont and WFBC in Greenville, South Carolina; the $2.3 million deal was approved by the Federal Communications Commission (FCC) that November. In September 1967, the News-Piedmont Company and its associated companies announced that they would merge to form Multimedia, Inc., by January 1, 1968.

=== MOR and country ===
As network programming moved from radio to television, WWNC switched to a full service, middle of the road (MOR) format, including popular adult music, news and sports. In 1969, WWNC switched from MOR to country music.

In the days before FM became popular, WWNC was sometimes the highest-rated station in the United States with an Arbitron share over 40 percent, occasionally as high as 50 percent for morning drive time disc jockey Scotty Rhodarmer. It was the top station in the Asheville radio market for many years.

Heritage Broadcast Group purchased WWNC from Multimedia, Inc., for $7.25 million in 1987. Heritage already owned WISE and WKSF in Asheville; it would sell WISE to United Broadcasting Enterprises a few months later. In 1993, Heritage sold WWNC and WKSF to Osborn Communications, in a $22.5 million deal that also included WAAX and WQEN in Gadsden, Alabama; WFKS in Palatka, Florida; and WOLZ in Fort Myers, Florida. Capstar Broadcasting Partners purchased Osborn for $100 million in 1996.

Capstar and Chancellor Media announced in August 1998 that they would merge (Hicks, Muse, Tate & Furst was a major shareholder in both companies); upon the merger's completion in July 1999, the combined company was named AMFM Inc. AMFM was in turn acquired by Clear Channel Communications (forerunner to iHeartMedia) in a deal announced on October 4, 1999, and completed in August 2000.

=== Talk radio ===
Logo before translator sign on

In 2002, WWNC changed its format from country music (except for the Scotty Rhodarmer morning show) to all-talk, taking over talk shows previously heard on WTZY (now WPEK). In 2004, Rhodarmer retired as WWNC morning host after more than 40 years in the position and 50 years as a station employee. In 1979, he had 56 percent of the audience according to Arbitron, more than any other local radio personality. His theme song was "Carolina in the Morning". On June 18, 2010, many of the former DJs had a reunion. They included Rhodarmer, Frank Byrd, Wiley Carpenter, John Roten, John Anderson and Randy Houston.

Western Carolina University broadcast a program in December 2010 on WWNC recreating Welles' 1938 broadcast of A Christmas Carol, including Arthur Anderson, who at age 16 performed with Welles in the original broadcast.

On April 1, 2026, WWNC began simulcasting on FM translator W225CJ 92.9 FM Asheville.
