= WTMT =

Radio station in Weaverville, North Carolina

Coordinates: 35.601°N 82.652°W

- Weaverville, North Carolina; United States
- Broadcast area: Asheville (Western North Carolina)
- Frequency: 105.9 MHz (HD Radio)
- Branding: 105.9 The Mountain

Programming
- Format: Classic rock
- Subchannels: HD2: Rewind 100.3 (Classic hits); HD3: 105.5 The Outlaw (Classic country)
- Affiliations: United Stations Radio Networks

Ownership
- Owner: Saga Communications; (Saga Communications of North Carolina, LLC)
- Sister stations: WISE; WOXL-FM

History
- First air date: 1988 (as WFSM)
- Former call signs: WFSM (1988–1993); WCTU (1993–2005)
- Call sign meaning: "The Mountain"

Technical information
- Licensing authority: FCC
- Facility ID: 72070
- Class: C2
- ERP: 9,500 watts
- HAAT: 339 meters (1,112 ft)
- Translators: HD2: 100.3 W262CO (Asheville); HD3: 105.5 W288CQ (Asheville)

Links
- Public license information: Public file; LMS
- Webcast: Listen Live; Listen Live (HD2); Listen Live (HD3)
- Website: 1059themountain.com; rewindasheville.com (HD2); outlawasheville.com (HD3)

WTMT (105.9 FM, "105.9 The Mountain") is a classic rock radio station licensed to Weaverville, North Carolina, United States, and serving Asheville and Western North Carolina. It is owned and operated by Saga Communications.

Asheville Radio Group, a subsidiary of Saga Communications, operates 105.9 The Mountain as well as adult contemporary WOXL and ESPN Radio 1310 WISE/970 WEZZ. Artists include AC/DC, Rush, Linkin Park and Korn.

== History ==
105.9 signed on the air in 1988 as WFSM licensed to Tazewell, Tennessee. It became WCTU in 1993.

Saga Communications purchased WCTU in 2005 and changed the call-sign to WTMT and its city of license to Weaverville, North Carolina, while preparing a move into the Asheville radio market during 2006 and early 2007.

On May 24, 2007, 105.9 signed on at its new transmitting site under test authority with various songs from different formats, nicknaming the station "The Lazer" during the stunt. On May 31 at 6:15 P.M, "105.9 The Mountain" officially signed on as a mainstream rock station under the slogan "Everything That Rocks". The first song was "Welcome to the Jungle" by Guns N' Roses. 105.9 has changed their playlist back to being mostly classic rock favorites, meanwhile there is very little recent or new rock songs that are played on air in its database as for right now.

Previous logo

The station's regularly scheduled weekday deejays include Lex and Terry, 6-10 a.m., and Craig Debolt, 3-7 p.m.

== HD channels ==
In June 2015, W262CO began airing 80s-based classic hits as "Rewind 100.3". The station began by playing 10,000 songs in a row by such artists as Michael Jackson, Madonna, INXS and Bon Jovi.

On November 20, 2015, W288CQ and WTMT-HD3 launched as "Legends and The Young Guns, 105.5 The Outlaw", with a mix of current and classic country, as well as a smidgen of Southern rock. Artists will include Johnny Cash, Merle Haggard, Waylon Jennings, Kenny Chesney, Tim McGraw, Zac Brown, Marshall Tucker Band, The Allman Brothers Band and Lynyrd Skynyrd.
