= WMXF =

Coordinates: 35°30′14″N 82°58′25″W

Simulcast of WPEK
- Waynesville, North Carolina; United States
- Broadcast area: Haywood County, North Carolina
- Frequency: 1400 kHz
- Branding: ESPN Asheville

Programming
- Format: Sports
- Affiliations: ESPN Radio

Ownership
- Owner: iHeartMedia, Inc.; (iHM Licenses, LLC)
- Sister stations: WKSF, WQNQ, WQNS, WWNC, WPEK

History
- First air date: September 10, 1947 (as WHCC)
- Former call signs: WHCC (1947–1999)

Technical information
- Licensing authority: FCC
- Facility ID: 40979
- Class: C
- Power: 1,000 watts unlimited

Links
- Public license information: Public file; LMS
- Webcast: Listen live (via iHeartRadio)
- Website: espnavl.iheart.com

WMXF (1400 AM), known as "ESPN Asheville", is a sports radio station licensed to Waynesville, North Carolina, which mostly airs the programming of WPEK in Asheville.

== History ==
WHCC was the only radio station in Waynesville for many years. It went on the air with a formal opening September 10, 1947, operating on 1400 kHz with 250 watts of power. The station was licensed to Smoky Mountain Broadcasters, of which W. Curtiss Russ was president.

In the 1980s the format was adult contemporary. Later formats included oldies and country.

In 1990, WQNS and WHCC owner KAT Communications of Myrtle Beach, South Carolina, filed for Chapter 11, but the stations were doing well and no changes were planned.

The switch to the current call letters was made around 1998 or 1999, and the station began playing adult standards soon after that. By this time Blue Dolphin Communications owned the station.

WMXF, WQNQ and WQNS were purchased by Clear Channel Communications now iHeartMedia, Inc. in 2001. The switch to talk was made in 2008, except for the morning show, which kept standards as part of the programming for a time.

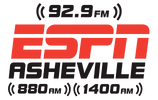
Logo while also being heard on 92.9

On June 11, 2018, WMXF changed its format from a simulcast of WWNC to a simulcast of ESPN sports-formatted WPEK.

== Current programming ==
WMXF simulcasts WPEK from Fairview. The station also features local sports programming such as Tuscola High School football games.
