= WMPC =

WMPC and WMPC-FM
WMPC: Lapeer, Michigan; WMPC-FM: Davison, Michigan; United States
- Frequencies: WMPC: 1230 kHz; WMPC-FM: 88.5 MHz
- Branding: Gospel 1230; 88.5 FM Praise and Worship

Programming
- Format: Christian radio

Ownership
- Owner: Calvary Bible Church of Lapeer

History
- First air date: WMPC: December 6, 1926; WMPC-FM: 2024
- Call sign meaning: First Methodist Protestant Church

Technical information
- Licensing authority: FCC
- Facility ID: WMPC: 65496; WMPC-FM: 766930
- Class: WMPC: C; WMPC-FM: A
- Power: WMPC: 1,000 watts
- ERP: WMPC-FM: 1,000 watts
- HAAT: WMPC-FM: 28 meters (92 ft)
- Transmitter coordinates: WMPC: 43°04′46″N 83°18′35″W; WMPC-FM: 42°59′32.1″N 83°27′43.5″W
- Translator(s): WMPC: 106.9 W295CT (Lapeer)

Links
- Public license information: WMPC: Public file; LMS; WMPC-FM: Public file; LMS
- Webcast: Listen live WMPC-FM Listen liveWMPC
- Website: www.wmpc.org

WMPC (1230 AM) is a noncommercial radio station licensed to Lapeer, Michigan, United States, and serving the northern suburbs of Detroit and the Flint area. It broadcasts a Christian radio format and is owned by the Calvary Bible Church of Lapeer. It first began broadcasting on December 6, 1926, and is one of the oldest continuously operating Christian stations in the United States. The church also owns WMPC-FM (88.5 MHz), licensed to nearby Davison.

The studios and AM transmitter are on North Lapeer Road in Lapeer. The AM station's programming is also heard on 250-watt FM translator W295CT at 106.9 MHz.

== History ==
The station first signed on the air on December 6, 1926. It broadcast from a homemade transmitter in the Methodist Protestant Church of Lapeer. In the 1930s, the frequency was 1200 kilocycles. It was a "share time" station, required to work out a schedule with the other nearby stations on 1200 AM. The power was only 100 watts.

With the 1941 enactment of the North American Regional Broadcasting Agreement (NARBA), WMPC moved to 1230 AM. It increased its power to 250 watts. The church's name had changed to the Liberty Street Gospel Church at 803 Liberty Street in Lapeer. WMPC was still required to share its time on the air with another radio station.

In the 1970s, the church changed its name to the Calvary Bible Church. WMPC increased its daytime power to 1,000 watts and was no longer required to share its time on the air with other nearby stations on its frequency. The radio station has only had four managers over the years: Rev. Frank S. Hemingway, Rev. Arnold Bracy, Bob Baldwin, and the current manager, Ed LeVoir.

In the 2000s, WMPC added an FM translator at 106.9 MHz, for listeners who prefer to hear the station on FM radio.

In 2022, WMPC filed a construction permit for a new FM signal, WMPC-FM, on 88.5 FM and serving Davison, with more modern worship music and some Christian talk and teaching not heard on the AM signal. This was built and licensed by late October 2024, when it went on air soon after. Aside from shared studios and ownership, WMPC-FM operates largely independent of WMPC 1230 AM.

== Programming ==
WMPC 1230 AM has a schedule of local and national religious leaders. Traditional Christian music, such as Hymns and Gospel music, airs anytime there is no scheduled program or to fill gaps in-between programs, hosts heard on WMPC include Chuck Swindoll, John MacArthur, and David Jeremiah among others. Adventures in Odyssey, among other children's programs, airs six days a week to appeal to younger listeners.

WMPC is a non-commercial, non-profit radio station. It holds a "Sharathon" on-air fundraiser twice a year to support the expenses of operating the station.

WMPC-FM 88.5 airs independently of the AM station, with Contemporary Christian music airing in-between scheduled programs. Ministers heard on the FM signal include Mark Jobe, Mike Fabarez (of Compass Bible Church ), Greg Laurie, Jack Hibbs, among others.

Sunday mornings the Calvary Bible Church airs at 10AM on both stations, the only time during the week that the stations simulcast each other.
