= WQNS =

Coordinates: 35.569°N 82.907°W

- Woodfin, North Carolina; United States
- Broadcast area: Western North Carolina
- Frequency: 105.1 MHz (HD Radio)
- Branding: Rock 105.1

Programming
- Format: Mainstream rock

Ownership
- Owner: iHeartMedia; (iHM Licenses, LLC)
- Sister stations: WKSF, WQNQ, WWNC, WPEK, WMXF

History
- First air date: 1979 (at 104.9)
- Former frequencies: 104.9 MHz (1979–2014)
- Call sign meaning: "Waynesville's Quiet New Sound"

Technical information
- Licensing authority: FCC
- Facility ID: 41008
- Class: A
- ERP: 6,000 watts
- HAAT: 62 meters (203 ft)

Links
- Public license information: Public file; LMS
- Webcast: Listen live (via iHeartRadio)
- Website: 1051rocks.iheart.com

WQNS (105.1 FM, "Rock 105.1") is a mainstream rock radio station in Asheville, North Carolina. The station is owned by iHeartMedia.

== History ==
WQNS signed on in 1979 at 104.9 FM and played easy listening music (the call sign stood for "Waynesville's Quiet New Sound"). When the station sold, it turned country and was branded Q-105 "Always Your Country".

In 1990, WQNS and WHCC owner KAT Communications of Myrtle Beach, South Carolina, filed for Chapter 11, but the stations were doing well and no changes were planned.

On October 28, 1997, the format changed to classic rock and country music moved to WHCC (now WMXF). On September 20, 1999, WQNS was paired with WQNQ (formerly hot adult contemporary WMXF), and the two stations became "Rock 104". Clear Channel (forerunner of iHeartMedia) bought the three stations in 2001. In 2005, the simulcast was broken off after WQNQ's signal was upgraded and changed back to Hot Adult Contemporary, but 104.9's Classic Rock format remained.

On January 10, 2014, WQNS completed its move to Woodfin, North Carolina, by moving its tower into Asheville and moving from 104.9 FM to 105.1 FM and rebranded as "Rock 105.1". The Federal Communications Commission issued the license for the move to Woodfin and 105.1 FM on June 25, 2014.
