= WPEK =

Coordinates: 35°32′48″N 82°28′15″W

- Fairview, North Carolina; United States
- Broadcast area: Asheville metropolitan area
- Frequency: 880 kHz
- Branding: ESPN Asheville

Programming
- Format: Sports
- Affiliations: ESPN Radio

Ownership
- Owner: iHeartMedia, Inc.; (iHM Licenses, LLC)
- Sister stations: WKSF; WQNQ; WQNS; WWNC; WMXF

History
- First air date: July 4, 1997; 28 years ago
- Former call signs: WTZY (1997–2004)
- Call sign meaning: Peak (previous format)

Technical information
- Licensing authority: FCC
- Facility ID: 41565
- Class: D
- Power: 5,000 watts day
- Repeater: 1400 WMXF (Waynesville)

Links
- Public license information: Public file; LMS
- Webcast: Listen live (via iHeartRadio)
- Website: espnavl.iheart.com

WPEK (880 kHz) is a commercial AM daytimer radio station, known as "ESPN Asheville". It is licensed to Fairview, North Carolina, and serves the Asheville metropolitan area. The station airs an all-sports radio format and is owned by iHeartMedia, Inc. Most programming comes from ESPN Radio. WPEK is largely simulcast on WMXF (1400 AM) in Waynesville, North Carolina.

WPEK broadcasts with 5,000 watts by day using a non-directional antenna. Because 880 AM is a United States clear channel frequency reserved for 50,000 watt Class A station WHSQ in New York City, WPEK must sign-off at night to avoid interference. The transmitter is on Sales Farm Drive in Asheville. WPEK can be heard around the clock on 180-watt FM translator station W225CJ at 92.9 MHz in Asheville.

== History ==
In 1988, the Federal Communications Commission (FCC) granted a construction permit for a new radio station in Fairview, North Carolina, on 880 AM, but it took nine years to build it. On July 4, 1997, the station signed on as WTZY. It was owned by EEI Communications and aired a talk radio format. It was the second Asheville area station to air The Rush Limbaugh Show (after WSKY). WTZY was an affiliate of CBS Radio News.

When the station's talk programming was moved to WWNC, WTZY became WPEK "The Peak", a classic country station. Later, the format was adult standards.

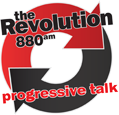
WPEK's logo as a progressive talk station

In 2004, the format was switched to progressive talk. For several years, much of the programming came from Air America Media. Later, WPEK had its own schedule of syndicated progressive talk hosts, including Bill Press, Stephanie Miller, Ed Schultz, Thom Hartmann and Norman Goldman.

In 2010, WPEK dropped Thom Hartmann, who moved to WPVM-LP, added to a schedule that included weekday hosts Lesley Groetsch and Blake Butler, whose "Local Edge Radio" included "politics, arts and entertainment, live music and local listener call-ins". Weekend programming included Mountain Music Time, a program of traditional bluegrass and mountain music broadcast on Saturday mornings, followed by an hour of the Errington Thompson Show.

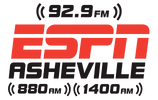
Logo while also being on 92.9

On June 11, 2018, WPEK flipped to sports, branded as "ESPN Asheville", with programming from ESPN Radio. The progressive talk programming, still branded "The Revolution", was moved to W266CP (101.1 FM) and WKSF-HD3. The progressive talk format ultimately ended in late 2018, when W266CP and WKSF-HD3 switched to alternative rock.
