= KVAK (AM) =

- Valdez, Alaska; United States
- Frequency: 1230 kHz

Programming
- Format: Country/Talk

Ownership
- Owner: North Wave Communications, Inc.

History
- First air date: 1982
- Call sign meaning: Valdez, AK

Technical information
- Facility ID: 12187
- Class: B
- Power: 1,000 watts (unlimited)
- Transmitter coordinates: 61°07′14.1″N 146°15′32.3″W

Links
- Website: http://www.kvakradio.com/

KVAK (1230 AM) is a radio station licensed to serve Valdez, Alaska. The station is owned by North Wave Communications, Inc. It airs a country music and talk radio format.

The station has been assigned these call letters by the Federal Communications Commission since August 9, 1982.

== History of call letters ==
The call letters KVAK previously were used by an AM station in Atchison, Kansas. That station began broadcasting on July 28, 1939, on 1420 kHz with 100 W power (daytime only).
