= WCBT =

- Roanoke Rapids, North Carolina; United States
- Broadcast area: Roanoke Rapids, North Carolina; Halifax, North Carolina; Emporia, Virginia
- Frequency: 1230 kHz
- Branding: Sports Radio 1230 WCBT, The Ticket

Programming
- Format: Sports
- Affiliations: SportsMap, Sports USA Radio Network, North Carolina Tar Heels

Ownership
- Owner: Shaunrita Williams and Jimmy Johnson; (Shantae Broadcasting Inc.)

History
- First air date: November 1940

Technical information
- Licensing authority: FCC
- Facility ID: 71250
- Class: C
- Power: 1,000 watts (unlimited)
- Transmitter coordinates: 36°26′45.0″N 77°39′51.0″W
- Translator: 102.7 W274AZ (Roanoke Rapids)

Links
- Public license information: Public file; LMS

WCBT (1230 AM) is a sports radio station licensed to Roanoke Rapids, North Carolina, serving Roanoke Rapids and Halifax in North Carolina and Emporia in Virginia. WCBT is owned and operated by Shaunrita Williams and Jimmy Johnson, through licensee Shantae Broadcasting Inc.

== History ==
On November 13, 1948, fire destroyed the studios and offices of WCBT. With only one turntable salvaged from the studio building, the station had to operate from its transmitter building. Limited space there meant that live talent had to perform outdoors. Ministers who conducted morning devotions drove their cars to the transmitter building and broadcast from the cars.

On September 27, 2013, First Media Radio reached a deal to sell WCBT to Johnson Broadcast Ventures for $100.000. The sale was consummated on December 19, 2013. Upon the sale's completion, the station dropped ESPN Radio for a music format featuring classic rhythm and blues, gospel, and Southern soul formatted broadcasts.

In 2016, WCBT returned to a sports radio format, changing their name to "SportsRadio 1230 WCBT The Ticket". WCBT airs programming from NBC Sports Radio and SB Nation Radio and features Sports USA Radio Network college football and NFL games as well as the Tar Heel Sports Radio Network football and men's basketball games.

Effective October 1, 2021, Johnson Broadcast Ventures sold WCBT and translator W274AZ to Shantae Broadcasting Inc. for $41,000.

== Past personalities ==
- Jesse Helms, news director (late 1940s)
- Wayne Harris (1951–52) nighttime deejay
- "Cousin Slick" (Roy Gray, Jr.), country DJ (1950s-1960s)
- Wayne Harris (1961–62) morning drive/news director
- Russ Barrett (1970s-1990), Operations Manager/Morning Drive
