= WEZZ =

Radio station in Canton, North Carolina

Coordinates: 35°31′58.4″N 82°51′57.5″W

Simulcasting WSKY Asheville
- Canton, North Carolina; United States
- Broadcast area: Waynesville and Asheville, North Carolina
- Frequency: 970 kHz
- Branding: WEZZ 970AM/97.5FM

Programming
- Format: Religious
- Affiliations: Fox Sports Radio

Ownership
- Owner: Lester Elton and Julie Ziegler; (EZ Radio LLC)

History
- First air date: 1964 (as WWIT)
- Former call signs: WWIT (1954–2001); WBCG (2001); WWIT (2001–2003); WOXL (2003–2005); WLZR (2005–2006); WYSE (2006–2024)

Technical information
- Licensing authority: FCC
- Facility ID: 51155
- Class: D
- Power: 5,000 watts (day); 30 watts (night)
- Translators: 97.5 W248CM (Waynesville); 102.9 W275CP (Canton)

Links
- Public license information: Public file; LMS
- Website: www.wilkinsradio.com/our-stations/wsky-1230am-102-9fm-970am-97-5fm-asheville-nc/

WEZZ (970 AM) is a radio station located in Canton, North Carolina, that simulcasts WSKY's religious format from Asheville, North Carolina. The station is owned by Lester Elton and Julie Ziegler, through licensee EZ Radio LLC. WEZZ is licensed by the Federal Communications Commission to broadcast with 5,000 watts of power during the day and 30 watts at night.

The station was formerly an affiliate of the Atlanta Braves radio network, the largest radio affiliate network in Major League Baseball.

== History ==
The station signed on in 1954 as WWIT (the call sign stood for "Where Wheels of Industry Turn"). WWIT was daytime-only and broadcast with only 1,000 watts. It featured a big band format that gave way to a Top 40 format by the late 1950s. Teenagers at that time considered Nathaniel Lowery ("Nat the Cat"), an afternoon host, a favorite disc jockey. "Nat the Cat" introduced the region to jazz, rock 'n' roll, and gospel music produced by Black and white musicians at a time when schools and churches were segregated in Western North Carolina. Bob Caldwell of WLOS worked at WWIT in the early 1960s. The station was known on the air as "Big-IT" and "97-IT" by the late 1970s.

The station was purchased by Dan Greene from Sid Watts in 1974. Greene switched back and forth with longtime legend Jimmy Haney working the popular morning drivetime slot. He worked for a power increase for several years and in 1979, WWIT increased its signal to 5,000 watts, but was still daytime only. The Top 40 format, now known as CHR, continued until the mid-1980s when it gradually switched over to adult contemporary. Greene sold the station in 1984. Prior to 1992, WWIT aired Pisgah High School football. The station was sold in 1994, to a new company that took the station classic rock as "970 WWIT". It eventually went into bankruptcy by 2000 and was sold, becoming WBCG with a country music format.

In September 2001, the station was sold to another company that switched the station to oldies and reclaimed the WWIT call sign. It was sold to Saga Communications in 2003 and became a full-time simulcast of the WOXL-FM oldies format. The station again dropped the WWIT call sign for WOXL. It became WLZR in 2005 and WYSE in 2006, after switching to a simulcast of WISE.

Effective March 29, 2024, Saga Communications sold WYSE and its two translators to Lester Elton and Julie Ziegler's EZ Radio LLC for $10,000. The station changed its call sign to WEZZ on March 31, and it now broadcasts predominantly religious programming.
