= WOXL-FM =

Radio station in Biltmore Forest, North Carolina

- Biltmore Forest, North Carolina; United States
- Broadcast area: Asheville
- Frequency: 96.5 MHz (HD Radio)
- Branding: Mix 96.5

Programming
- Format: Hot adult contemporary
- Subchannels: HD2: 98.1 The River (AAA); HD3: La Pantera 97.3 (Spanish CHR)
- Affiliations: United Stations Radio Networks; Westwood One

Ownership
- Owner: Saga Communications; (Saga Communications of North Carolina, LLC)
- Sister stations: WISE; WTMT

History
- First air date: July 29, 1994 (as WZLS)
- Former call signs: WZLS (1994–1997 and 1998–2002); WZRQ (1997–1998); WOXL (2002–2003)

Technical information
- Licensing authority: FCC
- Facility ID: 37242
- Class: C3
- ERP: 2,100 watts
- HAAT: 339 meters (1,112 ft)
- Transmitter coordinates: 35°36′4.4″N 82°39′6.5″W
- Translators: HD2: 98.1 W251AO (Asheville); HD3: 97.3 W247BV (Asheville)

Links
- Public license information: Public file; LMS
- Webcast: Listen live; HD2: Listen live; HD3: Listen live
- Website: mymix965.com; HD2: 981theriver.com; HD3: lapantera973.com

WOXL-FM (96.5 MHz; "Mix 96.5") is a radio station licensed to Biltmore Forest, North Carolina, United States, the station serves the Asheville area and broadcasts a hot adult contemporary music format. The station is owned by Saga Communications, and operates as part of its Asheville Radio Group.

== Station history ==
In August 1987, the FCC allocated a new frequency, 96.5 FM, to the town of Biltmore Forest, near Asheville. Thirteen applicants filed during the filing window. One of the applicants was Orion Broadcasting, a small family-owned company headed up by Zeb Lee. Lee had operated 1230 AM WSKY in Asheville for many years and had felt that the FM was the future medium for radio listening.

Because of the number of applicants, the FCC arranged a hearing in 1989. During that time Orion tried to negotiate with the other applicants, offering up to 2 million dollars at one point, which they declined. In 1990 and 1991, the FCC's Administrative Law Judge (ALJ) and Review Board had both ruled in favor of Orion Broadcasting based on their track record of public affairs with WSKY and awarded the station's construction permit on the condition that WSKY was sold. The station signed on July 29, 1994, under test authority as WZLS (for "Zeb Lee's Station") with a classic rock-leaning album rock format under the "Z96.5" handle. After the sound of a ticking clock, the first song was "FM" by Steely Dan.

In the meantime, some of the other applicants for the license had merged to form a group called Biltmore Forest Radio Inc., headed up by U.S. House Representative Mel Watt. The group was successful in pointing out in the U.S. Court Of Appeals in a separate case Bechtel v. FCC (10 F.3d 875) that the FCC's "interrogation preference" was "arbitrary and capricious". This ruling eventually forced the FCC to place a freeze on new station licenses for a time and to revoke Orion's construction permit for WZLS. On June 2, 1997, after several appeals, WZLS was forced off the air by midnight. Biltmore Forest Radio's WZRQ signed on that same day under a time-brokered agreement with Styles Broadcasting out of Panama City, Florida. However, for "almost one whole day", both stations were broadcasting at the same time, which caused the stations to interfere with each other since they were on the same frequency, though WZRQ had a different transmitter site, shared with WCQS. WZRQ featured a similar album rock format to what WZLS had, with the exception that it was mostly voice-tracked. In the meantime, U.S. Senator Jesse Helms appealed to the U.S. Court Of Appeals on Orion Broadcasting's behalf, and was successful in getting the construction permit returned to the Lee family. On January 17, 1998, WZRQ shut down by court order and WZLS returned to the airwaves after a seven-month absence, with a ticking clock and "FM" by Steely Dan. During its absence, station revenue and personnel were lost. On August 1 of that same year, Zeb Lee died. His family carried on in operating WZLS while fighting the FCC for the license of the station.

During the time that WZLS was off the air, a rider was attached to the 1997 Balanced Budget Bill by Arizona Senator John McCain which required that new radio and TV frequency licenses were to be auctioned off to the highest bidder. Since WZLS was operating under a construction permit and had not been licensed yet, the frequency was placed on the market. It was auctioned off on September 28, 1999, and awarded to Liberty Productions, the highest bidder. Orion Broadcasting, who was forced to bid on their own station, came in third. With less than nine hours notice, on February 21, 2002, WZLS was forced off the air by the FCC. Now under the ownership of Liberty Productions, which had leased out the airtime to Saga Communications, the 96.5 frequency stunted over a period of several days with different formats. After the stunting ended, WOXL signed on with an oldies format under the name "Oldies 96.5". In its first Arbitron ratings period, the station debuted in first place. Because of its limited signal due to the area's mountainous terrain, the station added a simulcast partner as 970 WWIT in nearby Canton was purchased in 2003, becoming WOXL (AM). That station is now WEZZ and airs another station's programming.

Within a few years, WOXL-FM's ratings started to drop and the station adjusted its format many times, notably to more 1970s-based hits as "96.5 WOXL", then rock-leaning classic hits as "Classic Hits 96.5", keeping the WOXL-FM callsign. On December 25, 2008, the station flipped to adult contemporary as "Mix 96.5". As of 2016, its slogan changed to "Asheville's Hit Music Station", to compete more with CHR/Top 40-formatted station, WQNQ, "Star 104.3". WOXL-FM adjusted their format to hot AC, and still plays some songs from the 1990s.

== Translators ==
Since 2008 the HD2 channel AAA "98.1 the River" has been heard on W251AO.

As of May 2018 the HD3 channel played "Pure Oldies 97.3", heard on W247BV, with music from the 50s and 60s. That station switched to Spanish CHR July 3, 2024.

Call sign	Frequency	City of license	FID	ERP (W)	HAAT	Class	Transmitter coordinates	FCC info	Notes
W251AO	98.1 FM	Asheville, North Carolina	137991	250	326.1 m (1,070 ft)	D	35°36′4.4″N 82°39′6.5″W	LMS	Relays HD2 "98.1 The River"
W247BV	97.3 FM	Asheville, North Carolina	141108	250	0 m (0 ft)	D	35°36′5.3″N 82°39′5.4″W	LMS	Relays HD3 "La Pantera 97.3"
