= WXLI =

- Dublin, Georgia; United States
- Frequency: 1230 kHz

Programming
- Format: Country music
- Affiliations: CBS News Radio, Westwood One

Ownership
- Owner: Laurens County Broadcasting Co., Inc

Technical information
- Licensing authority: FCC
- Facility ID: 36722
- Class: C
- Power: 700 watts unlimited
- Transmitter coordinates: 32°31′21.00″N 82°54′0.00″W
- Translator: 93.1 W226BP (Dublin)

Links
- Public license information: Public file; LMS

WXLI (1230 AM) is a radio station broadcasting a country music format. Licensed to Dublin, Georgia, United States. The station is currently owned by Laurens County Broadcasting Co., Inc and features programming from CBS News Radio and Westwood One.
