= WSKY (AM) =

Asheville, North Carolina; United States
- Frequency: 1230 kHz
- Branding: WSKY 1230AM/102.9FM

Programming
- Format: Christian radio

Ownership
- Owner: Wilkins Communications Network; (Macon Media, Inc.)

History
- First air date: 1947
- Call sign meaning: "The Big Sky"

Technical information
- Licensing authority: FCC
- Facility ID: 56521
- Class: C
- Power: 1,000 watts
- Transmitter coordinates: 35°37′8.4″N 82°34′18.5″W
- Repeater: 970 WEZZ (Canton)

Links
- Public license information: Public file; LMS
- Website: www.wilkinsradio.com/our-stations/wsky-1230am-102-9fm-970am-97-5fm-asheville-nc/

WSKY (1230 AM) is a non-commercial radio station licensed to Asheville, North Carolina, United States. Owned by the Wilkins Communications Network, it features a Christian format. Its programming is simulcast in Canton on WEZZ (970 AM).

== History ==
WSKY's original license was issued on May 27, 1947. For almost 50 years, Zeb Lee ran WSKY, including serving as an announcer for high-school football games. He was the first to introduce rock and roll to Asheville when he sponsored an Elvis Presley concert in 1955. Zeb Lee was a pioneer in Asheville broadcasting. First he loved radio and honestly cared about the community; he produced many great radio programs, including "The Man on the Street" a daily talk show live in front of the S & W Cafeteria in downtown Asheville. For many years Zeb and his engineer "Buddy" Resienburg did a live broadcast of every Asheville High football game. Zeb Lee hired and trained many DJs who went on to have great careers in large market radio. WSKY was a Top 40 station in the 1970s and early 1980s.

In March 1994, Lee sold WSKY in order to put WZLS on the air. New owner River City Communications switched the format from a mix of music and Larry King, Rush Limbaugh and the Atlanta Braves to a format of mostly satellite-delivered oldies, with Limbaugh and a local morning host called Mountain Man. Between the songs, Mountain Man included comedy, some of it risqué, and he was dropped or resigned after several months because he "crossed the line". Station manager Chris Pedersen took over July 18, 1994, promising a "kinder, gentler" program.

On January 25, 1995, WSKY switched from oldies to news/talk. In addition to Limbaugh, WSKY added Good Day USA with Doug Stephan (with Dan Poe doing local reports), Derrick DeSilva, G. Gordon Liddy, David Brenner, Tom Leykis, Jim Bohannon and Stan Major.

Rick Howerton tried to purchase the station to no avail, however he was able to secure the rights to an old Southern Railway frequency (AM 880) that was eventually sold to a local businessman/entrepreneur - while WSKY was sold to Wilkins Communications and changed to Christian programming. After several months of trying to get the station on the air, Howerton was asked back and to assist and signed on WTZY in the summer of 1997. Subsequently, most of the programming on WSKY was added to the new WTZY (now WPEK). WTZY also shared simulcast duties with WTZK (formerly WZQR in Black Mountain, North Carolina) which was also purchased by the local businessman. Howerton went on to form Zybek Media Group with his wife Beth and they purchased WAAK (WZRH and WCRU) in Dallas, North Carolina, and WWRN (WZNN and WZGM) in Black Mountain, North Carolina.
