= KZHC-FM =

Radio station in Burns, Oregon, United States

- Burns, Oregon; United States
- Frequency: 92.7 MHz
- Branding: KZHC 92.7

Programming
- Format: Country
- Affiliations: Fox News Radio

Ownership
- Owner: Randolph and Debra McKone; (KJDY, LLC)
- Sister stations: KZHC

History
- First air date: 1997 (as KQHC)
- Former call signs: KQHC (1996–2010); KORC–FM (2010–2011); KORC (2011–2017); KSQB (2017–2019); KHTZ (12/13/2019); KSQB (2019–2020)

Technical information
- Licensing authority: FCC
- Facility ID: 62264
- Class: C2
- ERP: 10,000 watts
- HAAT: 276 meters (906 ft) (906 feet)
- Transmitter coordinates: 43°34′22″N 119°07′50″W

Links
- Public license information: Public file; LMS
- Webcast: Listen Live
- Website: elkhornmediagroup.com

KZHC-FM (92.7 MHz) is a radio station licensed to serve Burns, Oregon, United States. The station, which began broadcasting in 1997, is currently owned by Randolph and Debra McKone, through licensee KJDY, LLC. KZHC-FM and sister station KZHC are the only commercial radio stations with Burns as their community of license.

== Programming ==
Until October 31, 2015 KORC "Ninety Two Seven the Quail" broadcast an adult contemporary format. Programs included The Bob and Sheri Show, John Tesh, and American Top 40.

In November 2016, Starlight Broadcasting took over the station, programming a hot adult contemporary format.

== History ==
This station received its original construction permit from the Federal Communications Commission on March 25, 1996. The new station was assigned the call letters KQHC by the FCC on May 10, 1996. KQHC received its license to cover from the FCC on February 10, 1998.

As part of a personal financial reorganization, KQHC owner Stanley M. Swol filed an application with the FCC in October 2003 to transfer the broadcast license for KQHC to SS Radio, LLC, a new limited liability company wholly owned by Stanley M. Swol. The license transfer was approved by the FCC on November 10, 2003, and the transaction was consummated on same day.

One year later, in November 2004, Swol's SS Radio, LLC, reached an agreement to sell this station and AM sister station KZZR to Leslie Ann Carson's Action Radio, LLC, for a reported cash sale price of $72,500. The deal was approved by the FCC on March 11, 2005, and the transaction was consummated on April 18, 2005. At the time of the sale, KZZR broadcast a country music format.

In August 2007, Action Radio, LLC, agreed to sell both KQHC and KZZR to B&H Radio, Inc., a company owned in equal share by Trevor Carson and Toni Carson, a married couple. The station combo sold for $67,000 in cash plus the assumption of certain debts for a total reported sale price of $209,700.98. The deal was approved by the FCC on October 1, 2007, and the transaction was consummated on the same day.

In May 2010, B&H Radio, Inc, agreed to sell both KZZR and KQHC to Harney County Radio, LLC for a reported $245,000. Harney County Radio, LLC was wholly owned by Joan M. & Leighton M. Reed-Nickerson, who also owned KORV (93.5) Lakeview, OR through Lake County Radio, LLC. The new owners had the FCC change the station's call sign to KORC-FM on July 16, 2010. The call sign was changed again on May 1, 2011, to KORC.

On October 31, 2015, KORC went silent.

In July 2016, Starlight Broadcasting LLC purchased the radio station from Harney County Radio LLC and rebranded it to "Alice 92.7, Eastern Oregon's Variety Station". The purchase by Starlight Broadcasting was consummated on October 28, 2016, and the station was back on the air as of October 2016. The station changed its call sign to KSQB on July 4, 2017.

On June 12, 2018, the sale of KSQB, co-owned KYQT, and the construction permit for translator K256DC was filed with the Federal Communications Commission. The FCC approved the sale of KYQT to Alexandra Communications, Inc. on August 1, 2018 and the transaction was consummated on September 24, 2018.

On December 13, 2019 KSQB changed its call letters to KHTZ. The call letters had become available after the license of the station using them in Texas was canceled. They then changed their call letters back to KSQB the same day. On August 7, 2020, the station changed its call sign to KZHC-FM.

Effective October 1, 2020, KZHC-FM, sister station KZHC and translator K256DC were sold to KJDY, LLC for $60,000.
