= Compass Bible Church =

Christian Church based in California

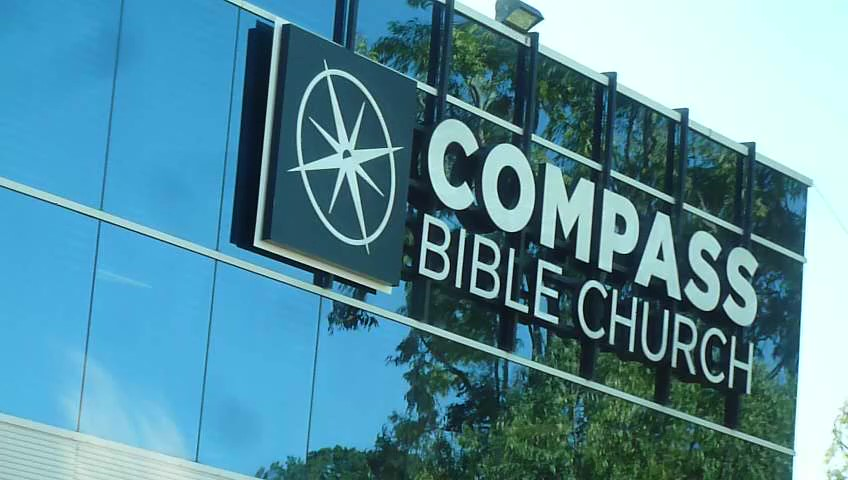
- Main building/sign of CBC
- Location: Aliso Viejo, California, Other locations across the world
- Country: United States, Guatemala
- Denomination: Non-denominational
- Religious institute: Compass Bible Institute
- Website: www.compasschurch.org

History
- Founded: 2005
- Founder: Mike Fabarez

Architecture
- Style: Contemporary/Modern

Compass Bible Church is an Evangelical, non-denominational, multi-site church based in Aliso Viejo, California. The church was founded in 2005 by the current senior pastor Mike Fabarez. It has since then established 7 additional locations, going international with the addition of "CBC Guatemala" in 2015. A Christian teaching institution, Compass Bible Institute (CBI), was also founded by the church in 2019.

== History ==
After graduating from Moody Bible Institute and Talbot School of Theology, Pastor Mike Fabarez founded Compass Bible Church in 2005 with the goal for people to "understand the timeless information contained in the bible.". The church then began to slowly grow from miscellaneous backyard settings up until acquiring the current building, and continues to grow in scope as the congregation size increases. In 2015, the church had a congregation size of three thousand people and has grown greatly since.

== Compass Bible Institute ==
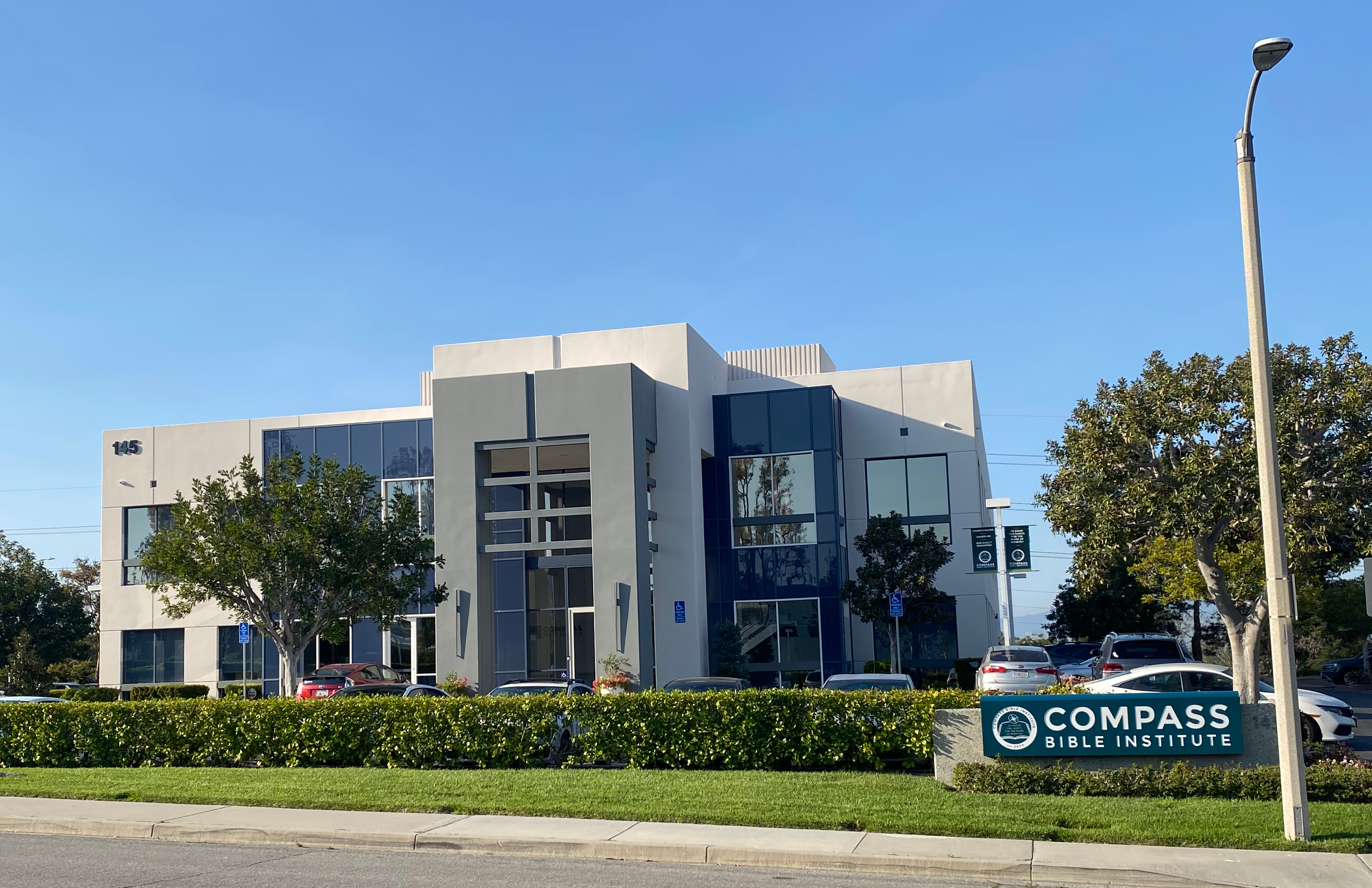
A picture of Compass Bible Institute (CBI)

In 2019, a Christian teaching institution "Compass Bible Institute" (CBI) was launched as a subsidiary of the church. The school offers numerous degrees and undergraduates in biblical studies, taught by some of the pastors of Compass Bible Church itself. The building of the institution is located across the street of the church itself.

== People ==
Pastor Mike Fabarez, the Senior Pastor of Compass Bible Church has written multiple publications on theology and expository preaching including 10 Mistakes People Make About Heaven, Preaching That Changes Lives, Lifelines for Tough Times, and Raising Men and Not Boys. These are published through Fabarez's broadcasting establishment "Focal Point Ministries," founded in 1998 (before Compass). Focal Point broadcasts Fabarez's weekly sermons to over 800 radio stations across the United States.

Compass has had numerous guest preachers deliver sermons at its campus, including J. Warner Wallace, Albert Mohler (the 9th president of the Southern Baptist Theological Seminary), and Frank Turek.

== Beliefs ==
The church holds to classic evangelical convictions, with the bible alone as the foundation for its theology. This accounts for its belief in direct expository preaching done weekly in many different age groups, emphasis on prayer, and constant proclamation of the Gospel of Jesus Christ. They hold a complementarian position on men and women's roles both inside and outside the church. The church hosted the Council of Biblical Manhood and Womanhood in 2019 for the organization's national conference. The church is also based on a contemporary and modern style in its dress and worship.

Compass believes highly in outreach for its local community to reach people with its evangelistic message. This includes events for Easter Sunday, and its annual "Fall Fest" taking place on Halloween, which has had more than ten thousand attendees.

In 2011 Compass created an advertisement to promote an upcoming Easter service to run in more than 45 movie theatres in Orange County. After paying more than five thousand dollars for three weeks of advertisement, the ad was disallowed by NCM Media News Network due to the mention of Jesus' resurrection. KABC7 did a report on the matter and interviewed Fabarez, who implied that it was an unjust action by NCM, while the NCM backed up their actions referencing their guidelines.

== Locations ==
Church planting is a "key distinctive" of Compass Bible Church. Since its establishment in Aliso Viejo, CBC has planted eight other locations. Seven of these total locations are based in the United States, and one location is international, based in Guatemala.

Name	Location	Date Established
CBC Aliso Viejo	Aliso Viejo, California	2005
CBC Huntington Beach	Huntington Beach, California	2014
CBC Guatemala (Iglesia Evangelica La Verdad Biblica)	Guatemala City, Guatemala	2015
CBC Tustin	Tustin, California	2016
CBC Treasure Valley	Meridian, Idaho	2019
CBC Hill Country	New Braunfels, Texas	2021
CBC North Texas	Frisco, Texas	2023
CBC Long Beach	Long Beach, California	2025
CBC South Valley	Kuna, Idaho	2026
CBC North Phoenix	Phoenix, Arizona	2027*

*Future/ongoing plant
