= KPRL =

- Paso Robles, California; United States
- Frequency: 1230 kHz
- Branding: The Right Choice AM 1230 & FM 99.3

Programming
- Format: Talk radio

Ownership
- Owner: North County Communications, LLC

History
- First air date: 1947

Technical information
- Licensing authority: FCC
- Facility ID: 64342
- Class: C
- Power: 1,000 watts (unlimited)
- Transmitter coordinates: 35°39′21.9″N 120°41′8.6″W
- Translator: 99.3 K257GL (Paso Robles)

Links
- Public license information: Public file; LMS
- Website: kprl.com

KPRL (1230 AM) is a radio station licensed to Paso Robles, California, United States, broadcasting a talk radio format. The station is currently owned by North County Communications, LLC.

In 2021, KPRL acquired FM translator K257GL-FM (99.3 MHz) in Paso Robles.
