= WNNC =

- Newton, North Carolina; United States
- Broadcast area: Hickory, North Carolina
- Frequency: 1230 kHz C-QUAM AM Stereo
- Branding: WNNC 101.3 FM & 1230 AM

Programming
- Format: Oldies
- Affiliations: Compass Media Networks; United Stations Radio Networks; Westwood One; Carolina Panthers Radio Network

Ownership
- Owner: Newton-Conover Communications, Inc.

History
- First air date: June 18, 1948
- Call sign meaning: Newton, North Carolina

Technical information
- Licensing authority: FCC
- Facility ID: 48788
- Class: C
- Power: 1,000 watts unlimited
- Transmitter coordinates: 35°40′20.48″N 81°14′11.3″W
- Translator: See § Translator

Links
- Public license information: Public file; LMS
- Webcast: Listen live
- Website: WNNC Online

WNNC (1230 AM) is a commercial radio station broadcasting an oldies music format and licensed to serve the community of Newton, North Carolina, part of the Hickory-Newton-Conover metro area. The station is owned by Newton-Conover Communications, Inc and broadcasts in C-QUAM AM stereo.

== Translator ==
WNNC programming is simulcast on the following translator:

Call sign	Frequency	City of license	FID	ERP (W)	HAAT	Class	Transmitter coordinates	FCC info
W267CH	101.3 FM	Hickory, North Carolina	157753	250	85 m (279 ft)	D	35°43′20.5″N 81°16′37.3″W	LMS
