= Asheville Citizen-Times =

Newspaper published in Asheville, North Carolina, United States

Coordinates: 35.595496°N 82.557400°W

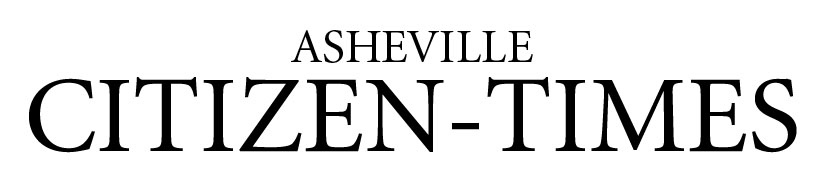
- Front page on June 16, 2009
- Type: Daily newspaper
- Format: Broadsheet
- Owner: USA Today Co.
- Editor: Karen Chávez, Executive Editor
- Founded: 1870
- Language: English
- Headquarters: 1 Haywood Street; Asheville, North Carolina 28801 United States
- Circulation: 26,347 Daily; 36,208 Sunday (as of 2018)
- ISSN: 1060-3255
- OCLC number: 24097281
- Website: citizen-times.com

The Asheville Citizen-Times, branded Citizen Times in its online edition, is a daily newspaper of Asheville, North Carolina. It was formed in 1991 as a result of a merger of the morning Asheville Citizen and the afternoon Asheville Times, and is sometimes referred to as AC-T by other news outlets. It is owned by USA Today Co. and operated through Gannett Co.

== History ==
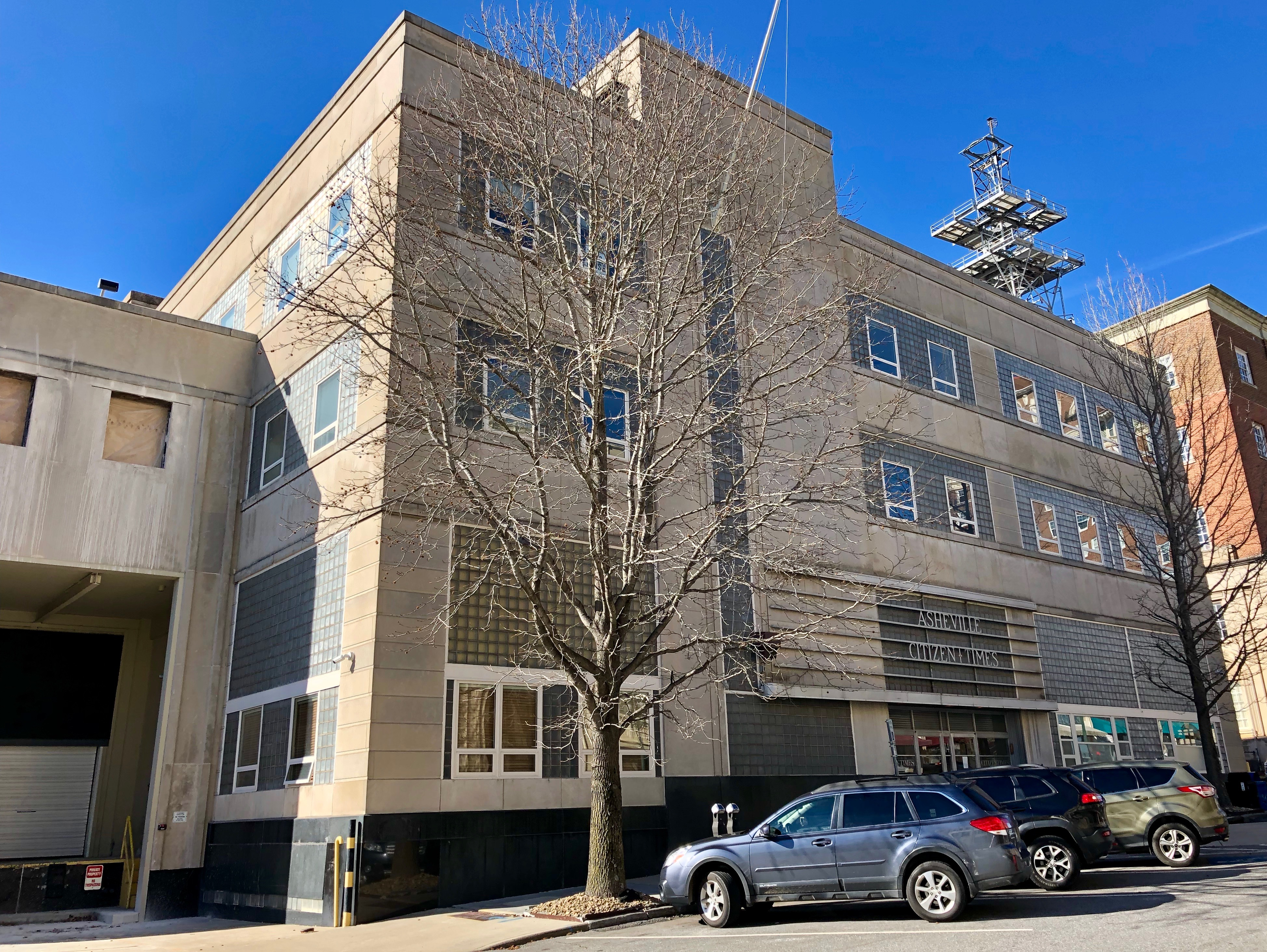
Exterior of the headquarters, 2012

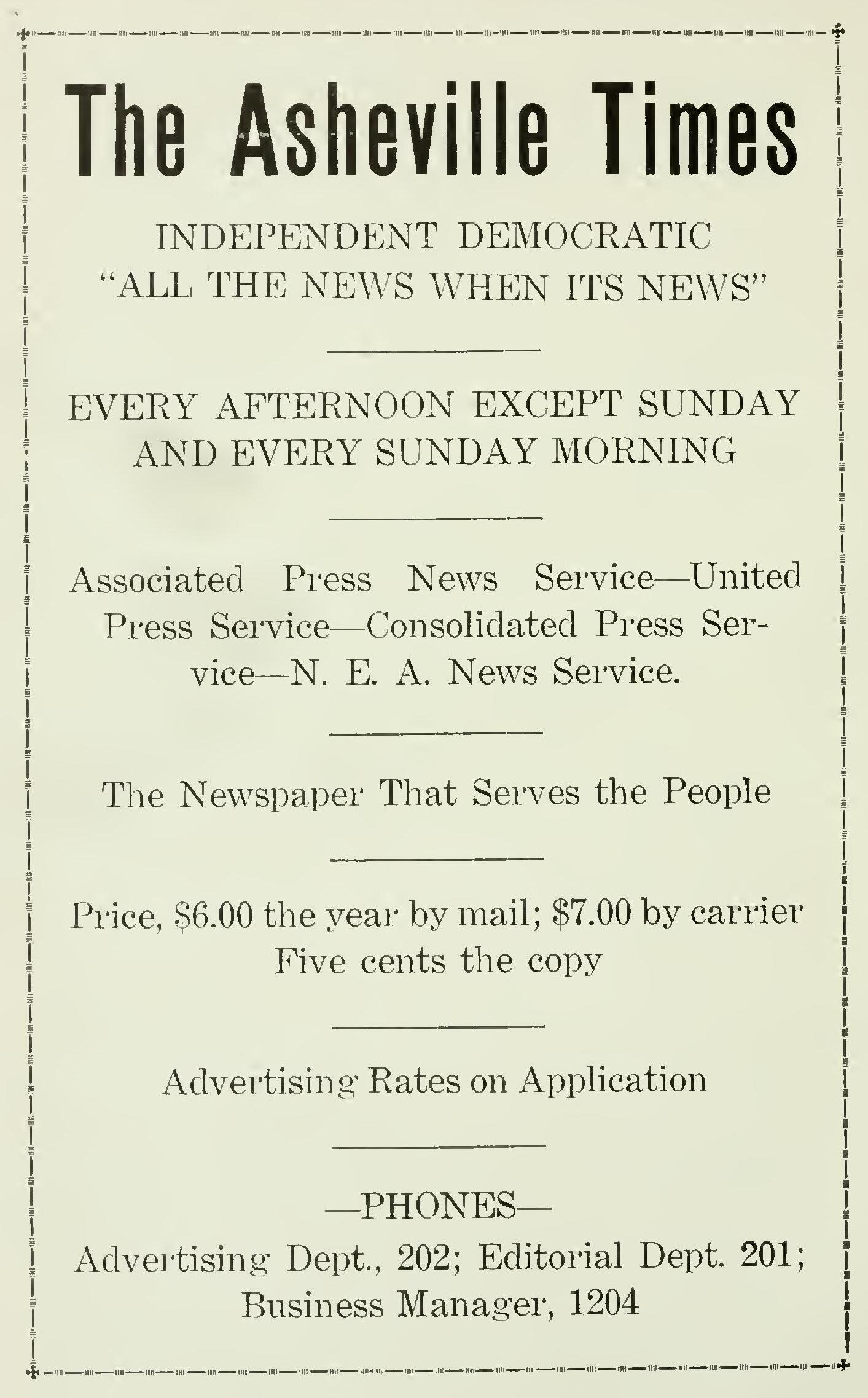
1922 advertisement "The Asheville Times" in the Asheville, North Carolina City Directory of 1922

Founded in 1870 as a weekly, the North Carolina Citizen became a daily newspaper in 1885. Writers Thomas Wolfe, O. Henry, both buried in Asheville, and F. Scott Fitzgerald, a frequent visitor to Asheville, frequently could be found in the newsroom in earlier days. In 1930 the Citizen came under common ownership with the Times, which was first established in 1896 as the Asheville Gazette. The latter paper merged with a short-lived rival, the Asheville Evening News, to form the Asheville Gazette-News and was renamed The Asheville Times by new owner Charles A. Webb.

The Citizen was in a former YMCA and the press was in the swimming pool. The Times was in the Jackson Building. The Citizen had to leave shortly after Christmas 1938 and publisher D. Hiden Ramsey asked Tony Lord to design a new building, which went up in 15 months at 14 O. Henry Avenue and also housed the Times. Charles Webb became president of both papers and the local radio station located on top of the building.

In 1954, the Citizen-Times Publishing Company which owned the newspapers and radio station WWNC was purchased by the Greenville News-Piedmont Company. In 1968 Greenville News-Piedmont merged with Southern Broadcasting Corporation to form Multimedia.

In 1986, $12 million was invested in offset printing presses and a new 42,000-square-foot (3,900 m^{2}) production building in nearby Enka, with composed pages transmitted electronically from the downtown Asheville building located nine miles (14 km) away. On June 28, 1991, the final Asheville Times was published. From that time, the Citizen and the Times were called the Asheville Citizen-Times seven days a week.

In 1995, Multimedia was acquired by Gannett. In April 1997, the Citizen-Times became the first daily newspaper in Western North Carolina to launch a website; the site now receives tens of thousands of hits a day.

In January 2009, although the paper spent $3.5 million more two years earlier, the press was shut down and shortly after sold off as scrap metal. The building was sold and the Citizen-Times moved printing to Greenville, South Carolina, and later Gastonia, North Carolina.

Gannett sold the Citizen-Times building in 2018. On March 31, 2024, the lease expired and the newspaper moved to the co-working space called The Collider in the Wells Fargo building at 1 Haywood Street.

== Naming and ownership ==
Asheville Citizen-Times's parent company is USA Today Co.; As of May 2026 it is owned and operated by its Gannett Co., Inc. It is branded Citizen Times on its website.

The newspaper is occasionally referred to as "AC-T" by other news outlets, although this is not used by the newspaper itself.

== See also ==
- List of newspapers in North Carolina
