= CHFC (AM) =

CBC Radio One station in Churchill, Manitoba

Churchill, Manitoba; Canada
- Broadcast area: Northern Manitoba
- Frequency: 1230 kHz (AM)
- Branding: CBC Radio One

Programming
- Format: News/Talk

History
- First air date: 1948
- Call sign meaning: "Fort Churchill"

Technical information
- Class: B
- ERP: 250 watts

CHFC was founded in 1948 as a 100-watt non-commercial military AM broadcast station in Churchill, Manitoba. CHFC was taken over by the CBC on 13 September 1959 and was on 1230 kHz with a power of 250 watts (non-directional) by 1966.

The National anchor Peter Mansbridge began his broadcast career at CHFC from 1968 to 1971, before moving to network owned-and-operated CBW 990 Winnipeg.

The station was tiny and, in the early-morning and late-night dayparts, the lone announcer was most often the only employee on duty.

By 1994, the station was generating less than an hour a week of original, local content; the majority of its programming was instead sourced from CBW or from the main network. As CHFC became a full-time rebroadcaster of CBWK-FM Thompson in 2001, it no longer originates content.
