= KZHC (AM) =

Radio station in Burns, Oregon

- Burns, Oregon; United States
- Frequency: 1230 kHz
- Branding: KZHC 99.1 / 1230 AM

Programming
- Format: Adult contemporary
- Affiliations: Fox News Radio

Ownership
- Owner: Randolph and Debra McKone; (KJDY, LLC)
- Sister stations: KZHC-FM

History
- First air date: September 28, 1957
- Former call signs: KRNS (1957–1984); KZZR (1984–2010); KBNH (2010–2017); KYQT (2017–2020)

Technical information
- Licensing authority: FCC
- Facility ID: 62265
- Class: C
- Power: 1,000 watts
- Transmitter coordinates: 43°33′53″N 119°03′34″W
- Translator: 99.1 K256DC (Burns)

Links
- Public license information: Public file; LMS
- Webcast: Listen live
- Website: elkhornmediagroup.com

KZHC (1230 AM) is a radio station licensed to Burns, Oregon, United States, and serves Harney County, Oregon. The station, established in 1957, is owned by Randolph and Debra McKone, through licensee KJDY, LLC. KZHC and sister station KZHC-FM are the two of only four radio stations with Burns as their community of license.

KZHC broadcasts a hot adult contemporary music format. In addition, KZHC airs a variety of local sporting events, including high school football.

== History ==
This station began broadcast operations on September 28, 1957, as KRNS with 250 watts of power on 1230 kHz under the ownership of Howard McDonald and James Ward, doing business as Radio Burns. KRNS upgraded its daytime signal to 1,000 watts in 1966 while its nighttime signal remained at 250 watts.

The station was sold to KRNS Radio, Inc., in 1974. KRNS Radio, Inc. was owned & operated by Bill Hampton. KRNS was sold to Warren D. Evans in 1978. KRNS was authorized to broadcast with 1,000 watts of power both day and night, its current authorization level, in August 1981. The station was assigned new call letters KZZR by the U.S. Federal Communications Commission (FCC) on April 10, 1984.

In December 1993, Warren D. Evans reached an agreement to sell KZZR to Stanley M. Swol. The deal was approved by the FCC on January 21, 1994, and, after a delay, the transaction was completed on November 3, 1994. In October 2003, Stanley M. Swol applied to the FCC to transfer the broadcast license for KZZR to SS Radio, LLC, a limited liability company wholly owned by Stanley M. Swol. The transfer was approved by the FCC on November 10, 2003, and the transaction was completed on same day.

In November 2004, SS Radio, LLC, reached an agreement to sell this station and FM sister station KQHC to Action Radio, LLC, for a reported $72,500. The deal was approved by the FCC on March 11, 2005, and the transaction was completed on April 18, 2005. At the time of the sale, KZZR broadcast a country music format.

In August 2007, Action Radio, LLC, agreed to sell both KZZR and KQHC to B&H Radio, Inc., for $67,000 in cash plus the assumption of certain debts for a total sale price of $209,700.98. The deal was approved by the FCC on October 1, 2007, and the transaction was completed on the same day.

In May 2010, B&H Radio, Inc., agreed to sell KZZR and KQHC to Harney County Radio, LLC for $245,000. Harney County Radio, LLC is wholly owned by Joan M. & Leighton M. Reed-Nickerson who also own KORV in Lakeview, Oregon. On June 30, 2010, the FCC approved the transfer of KZZR and KQHC to Harney County Radio, LLC. On July 16, 2010, the new owners had the FCC change the station's call sign to KBNH, for "Burns N' Hines". Later that month, KBNH changed its format from contemporary country to classic country. The KBNH format was changed to the Cumulus "Real Country" format on June 1, 2012.

The station went silent on October 31, 2015. In an FCC application for permission to suspend operations, the managing member stated there was a lack of personnel to operate it and the owner had left the country.

In July 2016, Starlight Broadcasting LLC purchased the radio station from Harney County Radio LLC. Starlight rebranded it as AM 1230 The Coyote, "The Sound of Eastern Oregon". The purchase by Starlight Broadcasting was consummated on October 28, 2016, and the radio station went back on the air on October 30, 2016. The station changed its call sign to KYQT on July 4, 2017.

On June 12, 2018, the sale of KYQT, co-owned KSQB, and the construction permit for FM translator K256DC to Alexandra Communications, Inc. was filed with the Federal Communications Commission. The sale was approved on August 1 and consummated on September 24, 2018.

Effective October 1, 2020, Alexandra Communications sold KYQT, KZHC-FM, and K256DC to KJDY, LLC for $60,000. KYQT simultaneously changed their call letters to KZHC.

== Former on-air staff ==
There have been many professional and first-time announcers employed at KRNS/KZZR. Howard McDonald and James Ward were the station's first owners and were also announcers, doing airshifts and commercial production. McDonald's "catch phrase" was "Burnzoreygon". Wow. Bill Hampton was also an owner and announcer, working morning drive. His children, Craig & Corrine did announcing duties, mostly summers and breaks from school, or after school. Craig Hampton did an afternoon show called "The Craig Connection" ooh playing popular rock & roll music. Craig was also the voice of Burns High Highlander sports for a few seasons. In 1978, Bill turned to the KIIS broadcasting Workshop for announcers with training. John C. Frost was the first KBW graduate to work at KRNS. After being hired as an announcer, he found himself as General Manager, as the station was in the sale transition between Hampton & Evans. GM Frost called upon KBW, and found Johnny Randolph & Paul Kaye. The trio worked to improve the general sound of the station to modern country & AC music. Almost a year later, Bob Murphy arrived from Hollywood. News was the reason he was hired, but amazingly he also pulled a two-hour music airshift from 9-11 am. Gary Pedro came on board after Paul Kaye left KRNS. When Bob decided to head back home to the middle of nowhere, Maia Carroll arrived from SoCal. Other announcers came and went in the three-and-a-half-year span of KBW grads.
