= WISE (AM) =

Radio station in Asheville, North Carolina

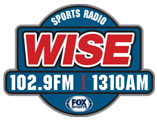
- Asheville, North Carolina; United States
- Frequency: 1310 kHz
- Branding: WISE Sports Radio

Programming
- Format: Sports
- Affiliations: Fox Sports Radio

Ownership
- Owner: Saga Communications; (Saga Communications of North Carolina, LLC)
- Sister stations: WOXL-FM; WTMT

History
- First air date: 1939

Technical information
- Licensing authority: FCC
- Facility ID: 68835
- Class: B
- Power: 5,000 watts (day); 1,000 watts (night)
- Transmitter coordinates: 35°37′9.4″N 82°34′20.5″W

Links
- Public license information: Public file; LMS
- Webcast: Listen live
- Website: wisesportsradio.com

WISE (1310 AM) is a radio station broadcasting a sports format in Asheville, North Carolina, United States. The station is owned by Saga Communications, and operates as part of its Asheville Radio Group.

The station is an affiliate of the Atlanta Braves radio network, the largest radio affiliate network in Major League Baseball.

== History ==
For many years, WISE was a Top 40 radio station. In the 1980s, the station switched to adult standards, with most of the music coming from Stardust, an ABC Radio satellite format.

Former logo

Early in 2002, Asheville Radio Partners, part of American Media Services LLC in Charleston, South Carolina, bought WISE and WOXL-FM, along with the stations' building on Lookout Road. Hal Green was the general manager, as well as WOXL's operations manager.

WISE gradually began adding talk shows in the early-2000s, eventually switching to talk radio full-time, and finally sports talk.

On December 3, 2015, Asheville Radio Group announced WISE would also air on 97.3 FM.

In 2018, WISE moved from W247BV 97.3 to W275CP 102.9. The 97.3 frequency, which remained the HD3 channel of WOXL-FM, switched to oldies. According to the FCC database, the FM translator on 102.9 MHz relays WEZZ.
